= Michigan's 76th House of Representatives district =

American legislative district

Michigan's 76th State House of Representatives district
Representative
| Angela Witwer; D–Delta Township |
- Demographics: 77.9% White; 7.9% Black; 6.7% Hispanic; 2.6% Asian; 0.3% Native American; 0.6% Other; 4.2% Multiracial
- Population (2024): 92,299

Michigan's 76th House of Representatives district (also referred to as Michigan's 76th House district) is a legislative district within the Michigan House of Representatives located in part Eaton County. The district was created in 1965, when the Michigan House of Representatives district naming scheme changed from a county-based system to a numerical one.

== List of representatives ==
| Representative | Party | Dates | Residence | Notes |
|---|---|---|---|---|
| Raymond C. Wurzel | Republican | 1965–1966 | North Street | |
| William L. Jowett | Republican | 1967–1980 | Port Huron | |
| Dan DeGrow | Republican | 1981–1982 | Port Huron | |
| James A. Docherty | Democratic | 1983–1984 | Port Huron | |
| Terry London | Republican | 1985–1986 | Smiths Creek | |
| James A. Docherty | Republican | 1987–1988 | Port Huron | |
| Terry London | Republican | 1989–1992 | Marysville | |
| Thomas C. Mathieu | Democratic | 1993–1998 | Grand Rapids | |
| Steve Pestka | Democratic | 1999–2002 | Grand Rapids | |
| Michael Sak | Democratic | 2003–2008 | Grand Rapids | |
| Roy Schmidt | Democratic | 2009–2012 | Grand Rapids | |
| Winnie Brinks | Democratic | 2013–2018 | Grand Rapids | |
| Rachel Hood | Democratic | 2019–2022 | Grand Rapids | |
| Angela Witwer | Democratic | 2023–present | Delta Township | |

== Recent elections ==
=== 2020s ===
2026 Michigan House of Representatives election
| Party | Candidate | Votes | % |
|---|---|---|---|
| Democratic | Angela Witwer (incumbent) | 26,516 | 57.06 |
| Republican | Bill Kaiser | 19,951 | 42.94 |
| Total votes | | 46,467 | 100 |
| Democratic hold | | | |

2018 Michigan House of Representatives election
| Party | Candidate | Votes | % |
|---|---|---|---|
| Democratic | Rachel Hood | 27,009 | 60.87 |
| Republican | Amanda Brand | 17,366 | 39.13 |
| Total votes | | 44,375 | 100 |
| Democratic hold | | | |

2016 Michigan House of Representatives election
| Party | Candidate | Votes | % |
|---|---|---|---|
| Democratic | Winnie Brinks | 27,046 | 56.72% |
| Republican | Casey O'Neill | 18,473 | 38.74% |
| Libertarian | John George | 1,558 | 3.27% |
| U.S. Taxpayers' | Brandon Hoezee | 603 | 1.26% |
| Total votes | | 47,680 | 100.00% |
| Democratic hold | | | |

2014 Michigan House of Representatives election
| Party | Candidate | Votes | % |
|---|---|---|---|
| Democratic | Winnie Brinks | 15,803 | 52.13 |
| Republican | Donijo DeJonge | 13,824 | 45.60 |
| U.S. Taxpayers' | William Mohr | 689 | 2.27 |
| Total votes | | 30,316 | 100.0 |
| Democratic hold | | | |

2012 Michigan House of Representatives election
| Party | Candidate | Votes | % |
|---|---|---|---|
| Democratic | Winnie Brinks | 23,530 | 52.06 |
| Republican | Roy Schmidt | 12,337 | 27.30 |
| Republican | Bing Goei (Write-in) | 5,484 | 12.13 |
| Independent | Keith Allard | 1,398 | 3.09 |
| Constitution | William Mohr | 1,362 | 3.01 |
| Libertarian | Patricia Steinport | 1,085 | 2.40 |
| Total votes | | 45,196 | 100.0 |
| Democratic hold | | | |

2010 Michigan House of Representatives election
| Party | Candidate | Votes | % |
|---|---|---|---|
| Democratic | Roy Schmidt | 11,678 | 66.32 |
| Republican | Marc Tonnemacher | 5,931 | 33.68 |
| Total votes | | 17,609 | 100.0 |
| Democratic hold | | | |

2008 Michigan House of Representatives election
| Party | Candidate | Votes | % |
|---|---|---|---|
| Democratic | Roy Schmidt | 23,413 | 71.33 |
| Republican | Marc Tonnemacher | 7,048 | 21.47 |
| Constitution | William Mohr | 1,340 | 4.08 |
| Libertarian | Matthew Friar | 1,022 | 3.11 |
| Total votes | | 32,823 | 100.0 |
| Democratic hold | | | |

== Historical district boundaries ==
| Map | Description | Apportionment Plan | Notes |
|---|---|---|---|
| | St. Clair County (part): China Township; Clyde Township; East China Township; Fort Gratiot Township; Kimball Township; Marysville; Port Huron; Port Huron Township; St. Clair; St. Clair Township | 1964 Apportionment Plan | |
| | St. Clair County (part): Algonac; Casco Township (part); China Township; Clay Township; Cottrellville Township; East China Township; Kimball Township (part); Marine City; Marysville; Port Huron; Port Huron Township; St. Clair; St. Clair Township | 1972 Apportionment Plan | |
| | St. Clair County (part): Algonac; Berlin Township; Brockway Township; Casco Township; China Township; Clay Township; Columbus Township; Cottrellville Township; East China Township; Emmett Township; Grant Township; Greenwood Township; Ira Township; Kenockee Township; Kimball Township; Lynn Township; Marine City; Marysville; Memphis; Mussey Township; Port Huron Township; Riley Township; St. Clair; St. Clair Township; Wales Township; Yale | 1982 Apportionment Plan | |
| | Kent County (part): Grand Rapids (part) | 1992 Apportionment Plan | |
| | Kent County (part): Grand Rapids (part) | 2001 Apportionment Plan | |
| | Kent County (part): Grand Rapids (part) | 2011 Apportionment Plan | |
