= Yale Public Schools (Michigan) =

School district in Michigan

Address
- 198 School Drive Yale, St. Clair County, Michigan, 48097; United States

District information
- Grades: Pre-Kindergarten-12
- Superintendent: Kurt Sutton
- Schools: 5
- Budget: $30,292,000 2022-2023 expenditures
- NCES District ID: 2636600

Students and staff
- Students: 1,734 (2024-2025)
- Teachers: 99.01 (on an FTE basis) (2024-2025)
- Staff: 243.49 FTE (2024-2025)
- Student–teacher ratio: 17.51 (2024-2025)

Other information
- Website: www.ypsd.us

Yale Public Schools is a public school district in St. Clair County, Michigan. It serves Emmett, Yale and parts of the townships of Brockway, Clyde, Grant, Greenwood, Emmett, Kenockee, Lynn, Riley, and Wales. It also serves a small part of Speaker Township in Sanilac County.

== History ==
1884 saw the construction of Yale's main school building, west of downtown Yale and south of Park Street near Mill Creek. The building contained Yale High School, which graduated its first class in 1892. The building was expanded in 1905. In 1930, a substantial addition designed by the Detroit architectural firm Lane, Davenport, and Peterson was constructed on three sides of the building. The expansion, which created the new front façade facing the end of Mechanic Street, opened in the fall of 1930.

Avoca Elementary opened in January 1958 and Yale Elementary opened in May 1958. Nine primary school districts consolidated with Yale Public Schools around 1960. In the 1961-1962 school year, the district had four elementary schools: Avoca, Goodells, Ruby and Yale. The Goodells school was essentially a one-room schoolhouse with 24 students and a single teacher for grades kindergarten through four, and its upper grades attended school at Avoca Elementary.

On Monday, May 15, 1967, the marching band led a parade of students and staff east down Park Avenue from the 1930 high school building to the new one. That Saturday night, students christened the new high school with its first senior prom.

Farrell-Emmett Elementary was built as the elementary school of Our Lady of Mt. Carmel parish. In tribute to Father John F. Farrell, the church renamed the school after him in 1970. It was leased, then purchased by Yale Public Schools in the 1970s. It was renamed Farrell-Emmett Elementary in 1999 to identify its location.

At the end of the 1980-1981 school year, Ruby Elementary closed and was put up for sale. The Goodells schoolhouse had closed by 1963.

The current Yale High School opened in fall 1995. The former high school then became a junior high, and the former junior high became a school for grades four and five, and the three other elementary schools in the district went to grade three.

Yale Intermediate School, the fourth- and fifth-grade building housed in the 1930 high school, closed at the end of the 1998-1999 school year, and those grades returned to their home elementary schools.

== Schools ==
Schools in Yale Public Schools district
School	Address	Notes
Yale High School	198 School Drive, Yale	Grades 9-12. Built 1995.
Yale Junior High School	198 School Drive, Yale	Grades 6-8. Built 1967.
Yale Elementary	200 School Drive, Yale	Grades PreK-5. Built 1958.
Avoca Elementary	8751 Willow Street, Avoca	Grades PreK-5. Built 1958.
Farrell-Emmett Elementary	3300 Kinney Road, Emmett	Grades PreK-5
