= Ruby, Michigan =

- Census-designated place (CDP) & unincorporated community
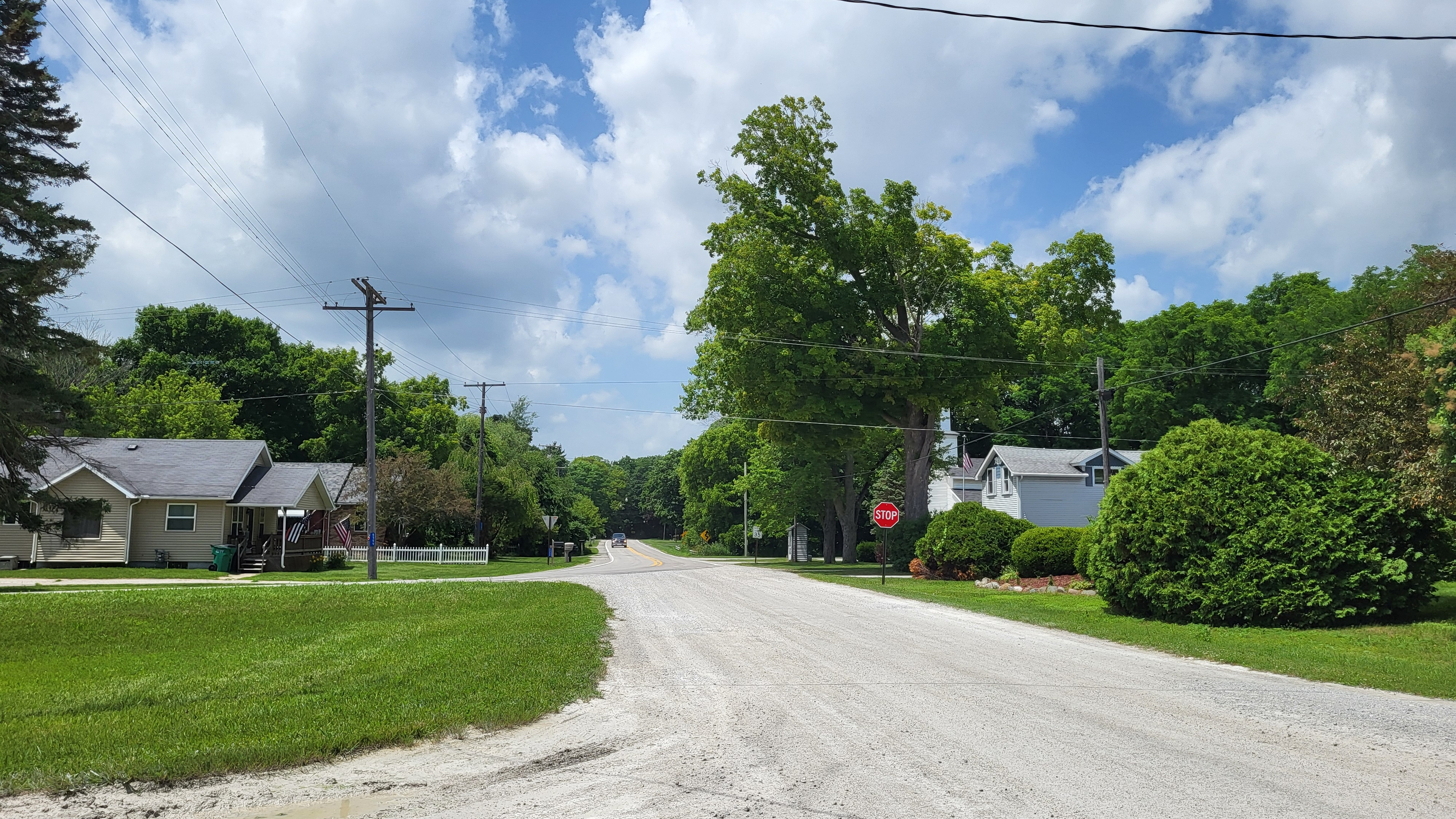
- Intersection of Abbottsford and Brott Road

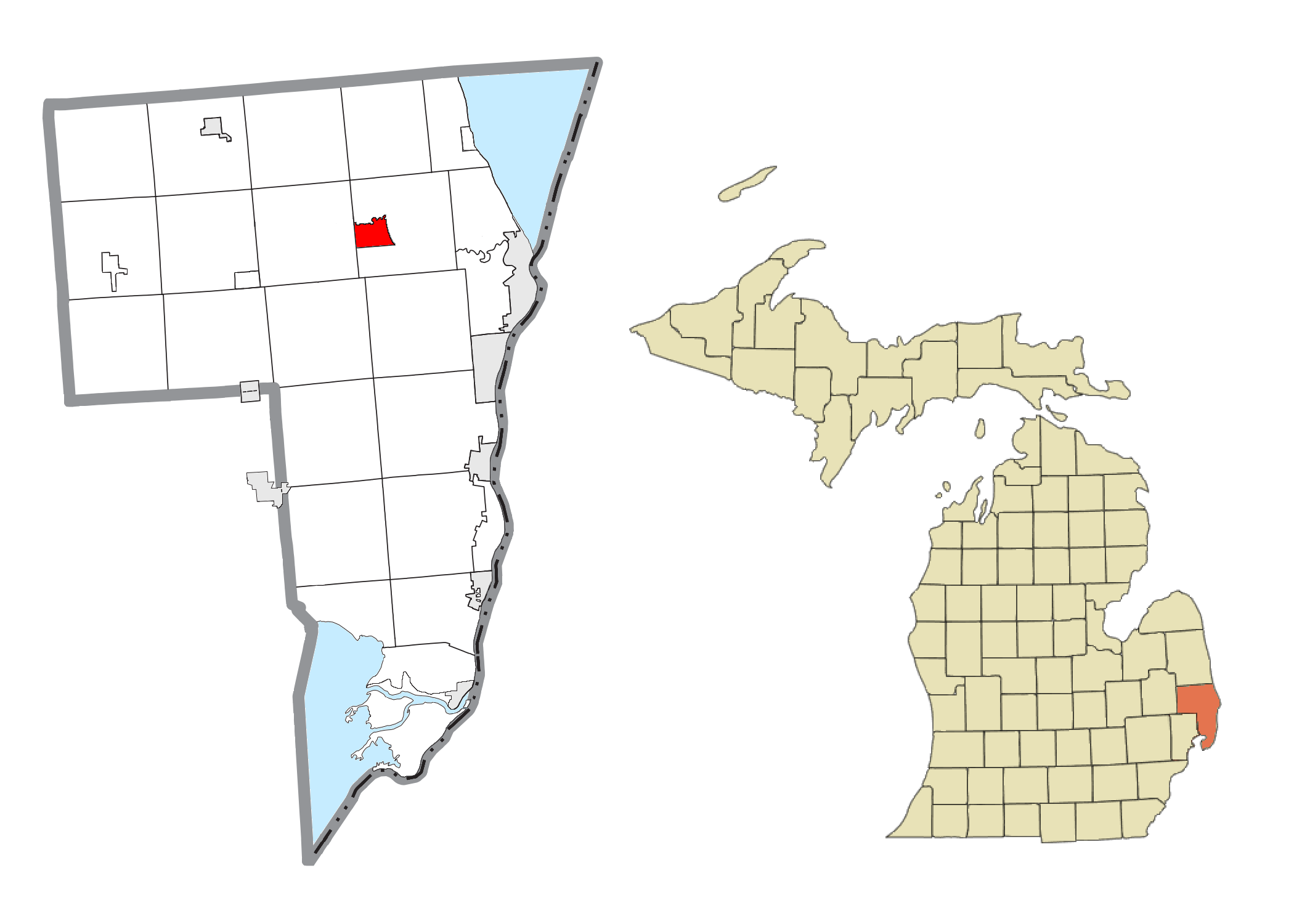
- Location within St. Clair County

- Location within the state of Michigan Location within the United States
- Coordinates: 43°02′32″N 82°36′27″W
- Country: United States
- State: Michigan
- County: St. Clair
- Township: Clyde
- Settled: 1854

Area
  - Total: 3.75 sq mi (9.71 km^{2})
  - Land: 3.75 sq mi (9.71 km^{2})
  - Water: 0 sq mi (0.00 km^{2})
- Elevation: 699 ft (213 m)

Population (2020)
  - Total: 852
  - Density: 227.2/sq mi (87.7/km^{2})
- Time zone: UTC-5 (Eastern (EST))
  - Summer (DST): UTC-4 (EDT)
- ZIP code(s): 48049 (North Street)
- Area code: 810
- GNIS feature ID: 1624873; 2806356

Ruby is an unincorporated community and census-designated place (CDP) in St. Clair County in the U.S. state of Michigan. The community is located just south of M-136 in Clyde Township. As an unincorporated community, Ruby has no legal autonomy of its own. The CDP had a population of 852 at the 2020 census.

== Geography ==
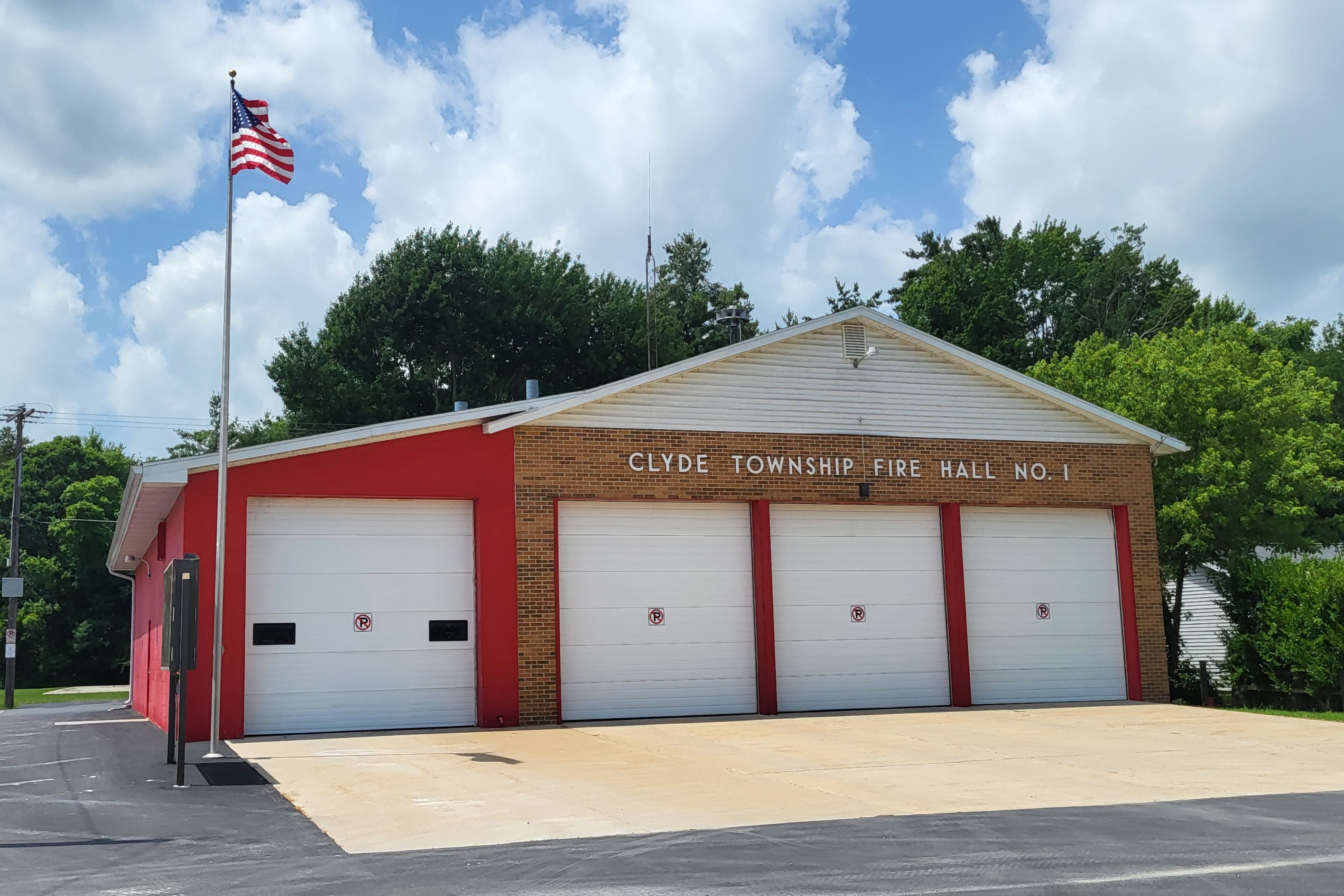
Clyde Township Fire Hall No. 1

According to the U.S. Census Bureau, the Ruby census-designated place has a total area of 3.75 square miles (9.71 km^{2}), all land.

Ruby is a rural community in St. Clair County in the Blue Water Area of Metro Detroit. The community is located in western Clyde Township just south of M-136, which is known locally as Beard Road. Interstate 69 runs about 5.0 miles (8.0 km) to the south. Ruby sits at an elevation of 699 feet (213 m) above sea level. Other nearby unincorporated communities include Atkins and North Street to the northeast, Abbottsford to the southwest, and Avoca to the west. The nearest incorporated municipalities include the village of Emmett to the southwest and the city of Port Huron to the southeast.

The community is located along the Black River, which flows into the St. Clair River. The Port Huron State Game Area is a large 6,858-acre (2,775 ha) protected area that occupies several units within the vicinity of Ruby.

The Clyde Township Fire Hall No. 1 is located in Ruby at 4545 Brott Road, and it is the only fire station operated by the township. The Fire Fighters Park is located behind the fire station. The small park includes a basketball court and picnic area, as well as an ice skating rink in wintertime. Ruby is mostly served by Yale Public Schools to the northwest in the city of Yale, while areas to the south and east are served by Port Huron Area School District in Port Huron. The Ruby Cemetery is located just southeast of the community at Abbottsford and Ford Road.

Ruby no longer contains its own post office and is served by the North Street 48049 ZIP Code. The name Ruby is acceptable and commonly used for mail delivery in the area using the same ZIP Code.

== History ==
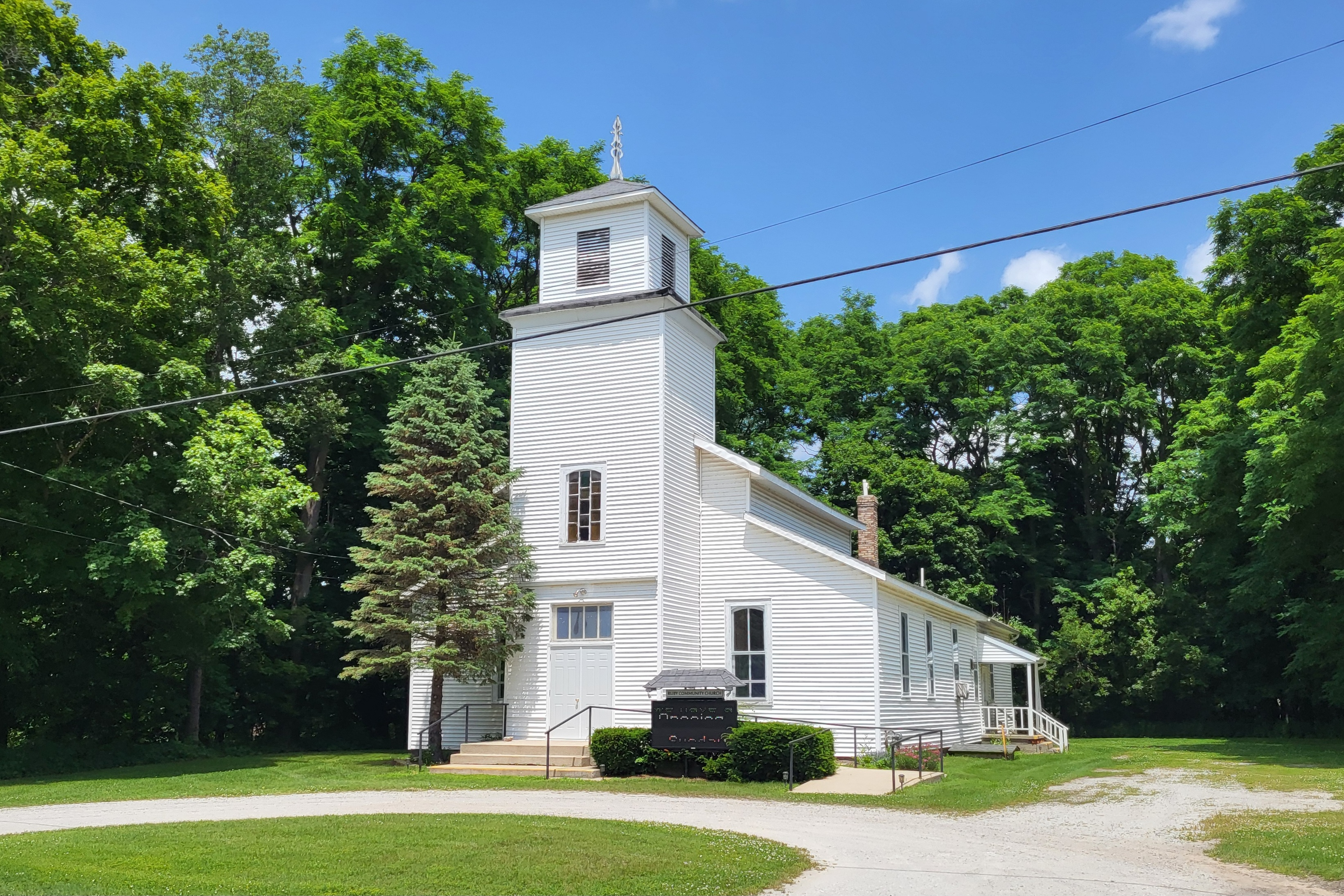
Ruby Community Church

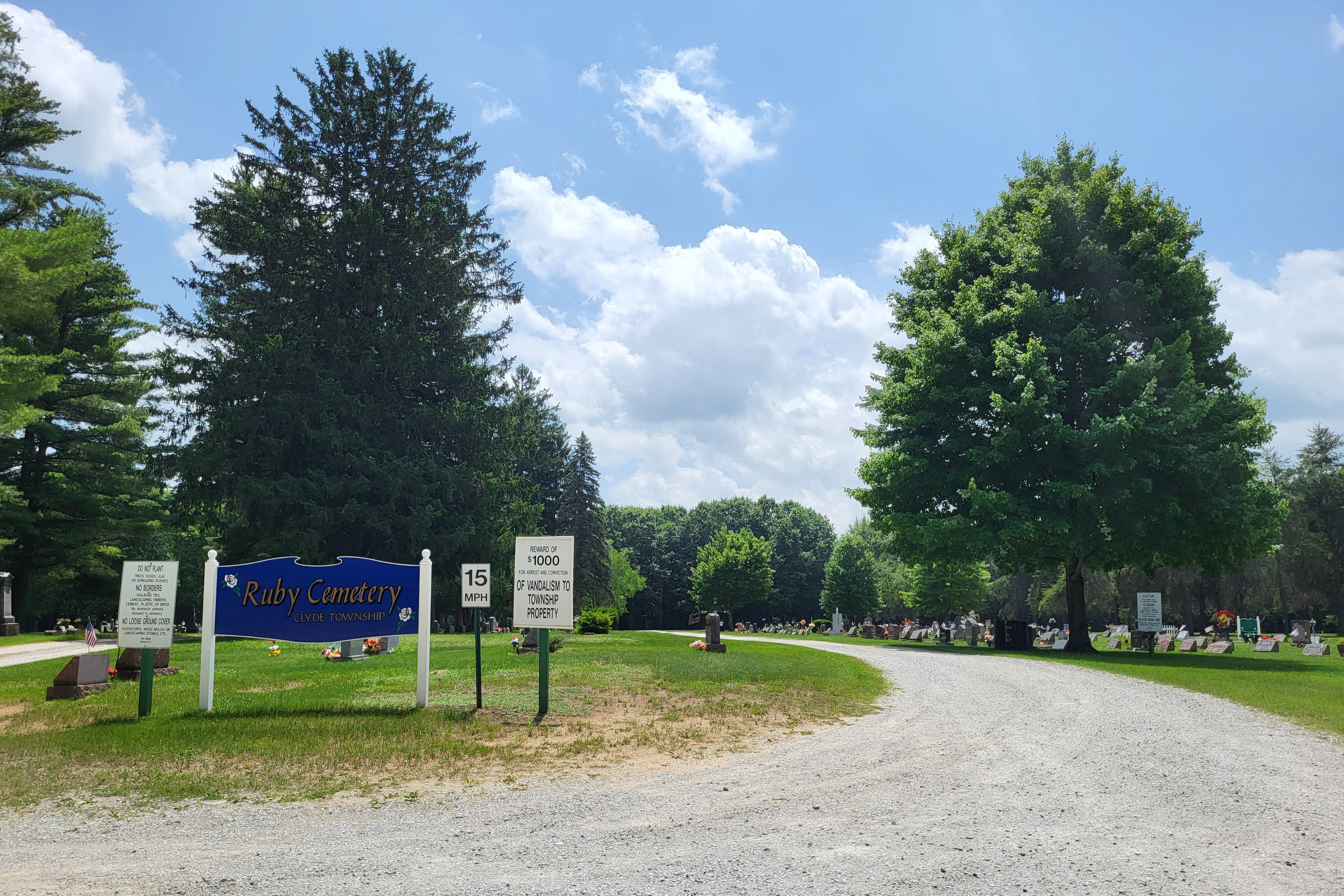
Ruby Cemetery

Clyde Township was established in 1836, and this unsettled area was referred to as Fairfield until sawmill owner John Beard opened a post office here along the Black River on September 30, 1854. He served as the first postmaster of the new community. The origins of the name Ruby are unknown but may have been chosen by Beard after the Michigan steamship of the same name.

The Ruby Methodist Church was organized in November 1854, and John Beard began holding services at his general store by 1862. He would later donate the land and a new church building would be constructed. Ruby developed as a lumbering community alongside the nearby community of Abbottsford. The two communities were seen as one large continuous village and were the township's largest settlements. By 1876, the area had a population of around 100 permanent residents, and Ruby consisted of the post office, church, sawmill, and several other manufacturing facilities. Around this time, the lumber industry declined in the area, and Ruby transitioned into a farming community. The post office in Ruby closed on January 31, 1907.

Ruby received rail service when the Detroit, Bay City & Western Railroad Company constructed a railway line through the community. The 121-mile (195 km) line was completed by 1916 and connected Bay City to Port Huron, as well as extending as far south as Marine City. A large wooden railway bridge was constructed in Ruby. However, the railroad proved financially unsuccessful and was short lived. In 1925, the Detroit, Bay City & Western Railroad Company ceased operation and was purchased by the Detroit, Caro and Sandusky Railway. The new company shortened the original railway route and made the Fargo station near Yale the southern terminus, which eliminated rail service to Ruby. The railway lines and the wooden bridge were completely removed soon after.

=== Recent history ===
After the railroad ended in the area, Ruby would benefit from the creation of M-136, which was commissioned in 1931. The short state highway runs for 17.0 miles (27.4 km) and connects Brockway to Fort Gratiot, and the highway passes through just north of Ruby. Ruby no longer has any railroads or railway service, although a Lapeer Industrial Railroad line runs just to the south through the community of Goodells.

The Ruby Methodist Church, which dates back to 1854, remains in operation and is located at 6650 Abbottsford Road in the center of the community. The church was recognized as a Michigan State Historic Site on July 19, 1990. The church operated as the Ruby United Methodist Church until 2017. After that, the church was reorganized and is currently known as the independent Ruby Community Church.

In 1971, Ruby received a fire station, the Clyde Township Fire Station No. 1, which serves the western portion of Clyde Township.

For the 2020 census, Ruby was included as a newly listed census-designated place (CDP), which is included for statistical purposes only. It is one of the three CDPs in St. Clair County, along with Lakeport and Pearl Beach—all of which remain unincorporated communities with no legal autonomy of their own. The Ruby CDP recorded a population of 852 at the 2020 census.

== Demographics ==
Historical population
Census	Pop.	Note	%±
2020	852		—
U.S. Decennial Census
