= North Street =

North Street may refer to:

== Settlements ==
- North Street, Berkshire, England, United Kingdom
- North Street, Bristol, England, United Kingdom
- North Street, Hampshire, England, United Kingdom
- North Street, Kent, England, United Kingdom
- North Street, Michigan, United States

== Roads ==
- North Street (Boston, Massachusetts), an American red-light district
- North Street, Glasgow, a road in Scotland
- North Street (York), a road in England
- North Street, Dorking, a road in England
- North Street, Romford, a road in England

== Structures ==
- North Street (SEPTA Route 102 station), a SEPTA Media–Sharon Hill Line station in Collingdale, Pennsylvania
- North Street (stadium), a football stadium in Alfreton, Derbyshire

== Organisations ==
- North Street Capital, LP is a privately owned private equity and hedge fund firm based in Greenwich, Connecticut.

== See also ==
- Basil Street in London, originally known as North Street
- North Street Historic District (disambiguation)
