= Tackaberry Airport =

- IATA: none; ICAO: none

Summary
- Airport type: Public use
- Owner: John L. Tackaberry
- Serves: Avoca, Michigan
- Elevation AMSL: 764 ft / 233 m
- Coordinates: 43°03′52″N 082°43′26″W
- Interactive map of Tackaberry Airport

Runways
Direction	Length		Surface
Direction	ft	m	Surface
18/36	2,244	684	Turf

Statistics (2007)
- Aircraft operations: 360
- Sources: FAA, Michigan Airport Directory

Tackaberry Airport was a privately owned, public use airport located two nautical miles (4 km) west of the central business district of Avoca, a community in Kenockee Township, St. Clair County, Michigan, United States.

The airport has been closed since at least 2010 and is no longer listed in the FAA or Michigan airport directories.

== Facilities and aircraft ==
Tackaberry Airport covered an area of 15 acres (6 ha) at an elevation of 764 feet (233 m) above mean sea level. It had one runway designated 18/36 with a turf surface measuring 2,244 by 65 feet (684 x 20 m). For the 12-month period ending December 31, 2007, the airport had 360 general aviation aircraft operations, an average of 30 per month.
