= Berlin Township, St. Clair County, Michigan =

Berlin Township, Michigan
- Civil township
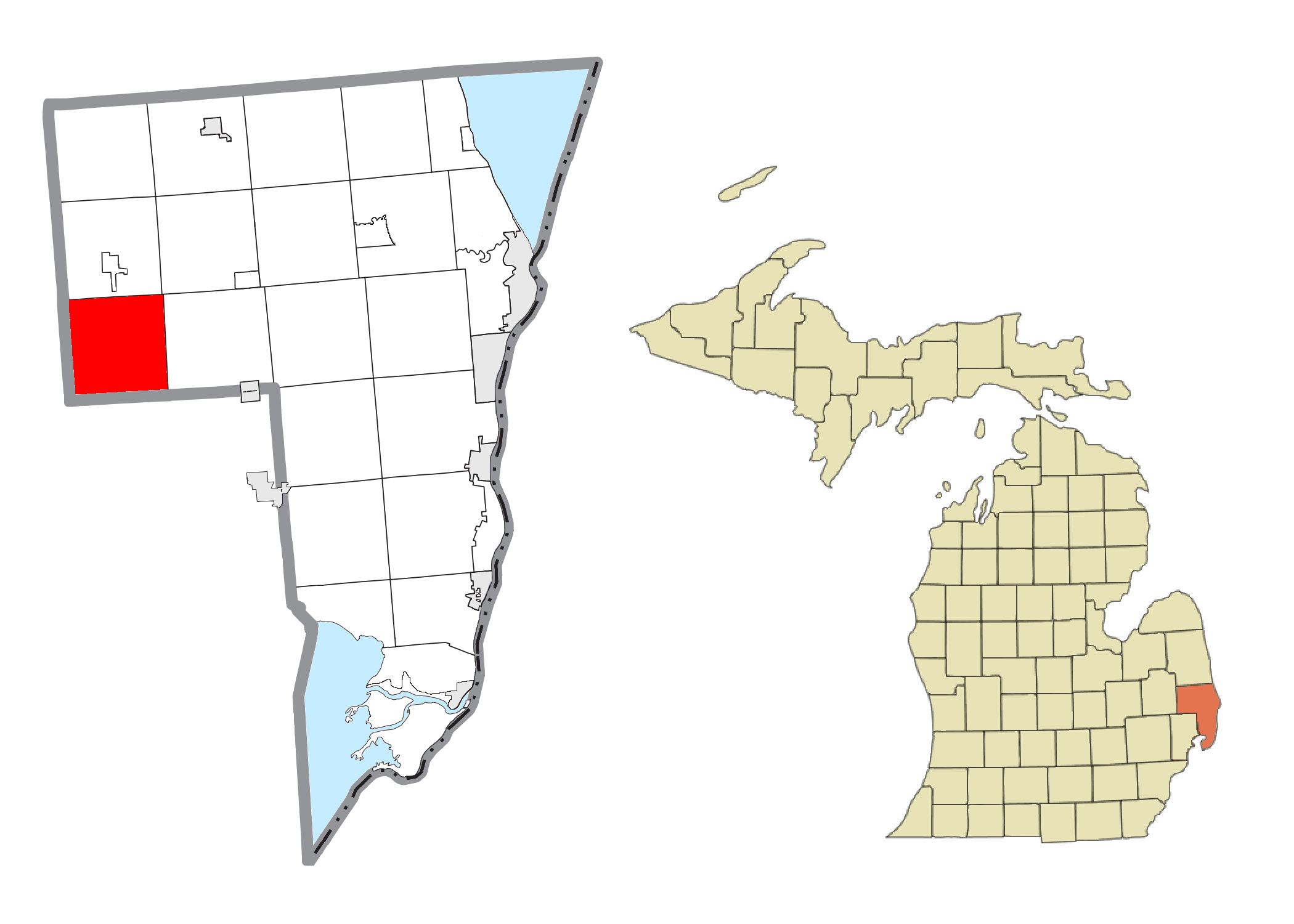
- Location within St. Clair County

- Location within the state of Michigan Location within the United States
- Coordinates: 42°56′18″N 82°54′57″W
- Country: United States
- State: Michigan
- County: St. Clair
- Established: 1842

Government
  - Supervisor: Bill Winn
  - Clerk: Karen Klos

Area
  - Total: 37.13 sq mi (96.17 km^{2})
  - Land: 37.12 sq mi (96.14 km^{2})
  - Water: 0.012 sq mi (0.03 km^{2})
- Elevation: 791 ft (241 m)

Population (2020)
  - Total: 3,115
  - Density: 83.9/sq mi (32.4/km^{2})
- Time zone: UTC-5 (Eastern (EST))
  - Summer (DST): UTC-4 (EDT)
- ZIP code(s): 48002 (Allenton); 48005 (Armada)
- Area code: 810
- FIPS code: 26-07760
- GNIS feature ID: 1625925
- Website: Official website

Berlin Township is a civil township of St. Clair County in the U.S. state of Michigan. At the 2020 census, the township population was 3,115.

== Geography ==
According to the United States Census Bureau, the township has a total area of 37.1 square miles (96 km^{2}), all land.

== Demographics ==
At the 2000 census, there were 3,162 people, 1,050 households and 872 families residing in the township. The population density was 85.2 inhabitants per square mile (32.9/km^{2}). There were 1,076 housing units at an average density of 29.0 per square mile (11.2/km^{2}). The racial makeup of the township was 97.19% White, 0.89% African American, 0.19% Native American, 0.22% Asian, 0.03% Pacific Islander, 0.57% from other races, and 0.92% from two or more races. Hispanic or Latino of any race were 2.81% of the population.

There were 1,050 households, of which 41.6% had children under the age of 18 living with them, 72.8% were married couples living together, 6.0% had a female householder with no husband present, and 16.9% were non-families. 14.1% of all households were made up of individuals, and 4.8% had someone living alone who was 65 years of age or older. The average household size was 3.01 and the average family size was 3.33.

Age distribution was 28.8% under the age of 18, 7.7% from 18 to 24, 32.2% from 25 to 44, 23.3% from 45 to 64, and 7.9% who were 65 years of age or older. The median age was 35 years. For every 100 females, there were 104.8 males. For every 100 females age 18 and over, there were 103.8 males.

The median household income was $61,157, and the median family income was $67,153. Males had a median income of $46,536 versus $30,337 for females. The per capita income for the township was $21,412. About 5.4% of families and 6.9% of the population were below the poverty line, including 11.5% of those under age 18 and 1.2% of those age 65 or over.

== Communities ==
- Allenton is an unincorporated community situated about five miles (8.0 km) south of exit 176, off Interstate 69 at 42°55′10″N 82°56′44″W. The Allenton ZIP code 48002 serves all of Berlin Township. The community was founded in about 1844 by Kerkimer Smith, an innkeeper who ran a stage coach line to Detroit. It was at first called "Smith's Corners" and was given a station named "Smith" on the Almont branch of the Pere Marquette Railway. A post office with that name was established in April 1883 and was renamed Allenton in March 1910 for Darius and Jesse Allen, who were civic leaders in the community.
- Berville is situated 4.5 miles north of Armada at 42°54′30″N 82°52′59″W. Berville is an acceptable name for delivery in the 48002 ZIP code. Berville was named to contain the first syllable of the township. Speculators began purchasing land in 1835 and actual settlement began by 1840. A post office operated here from February 1862 until July 1962. It was also known locally as "Baker's Corners".
- East Berlin was the name of a post office in this township from 1851 until 1856.
- Lesterville was a historic locale in the township at the junction of Belle River/Beardsley Road and Sperry Road at 42°57′28″N 82°54′20″W. It began as a mill settlement c. 1866 and was first called "Lester's Mills". Due to its location on the Belle River, it was also known as "Belle River", and was given a post office with that name in March 1867. The spelling was changed to "Belleriver" in January 1895 and was closed in January 1904.
