= Riley Township, St. Clair County, Michigan =

Riley Township, Michigan
- Civil township
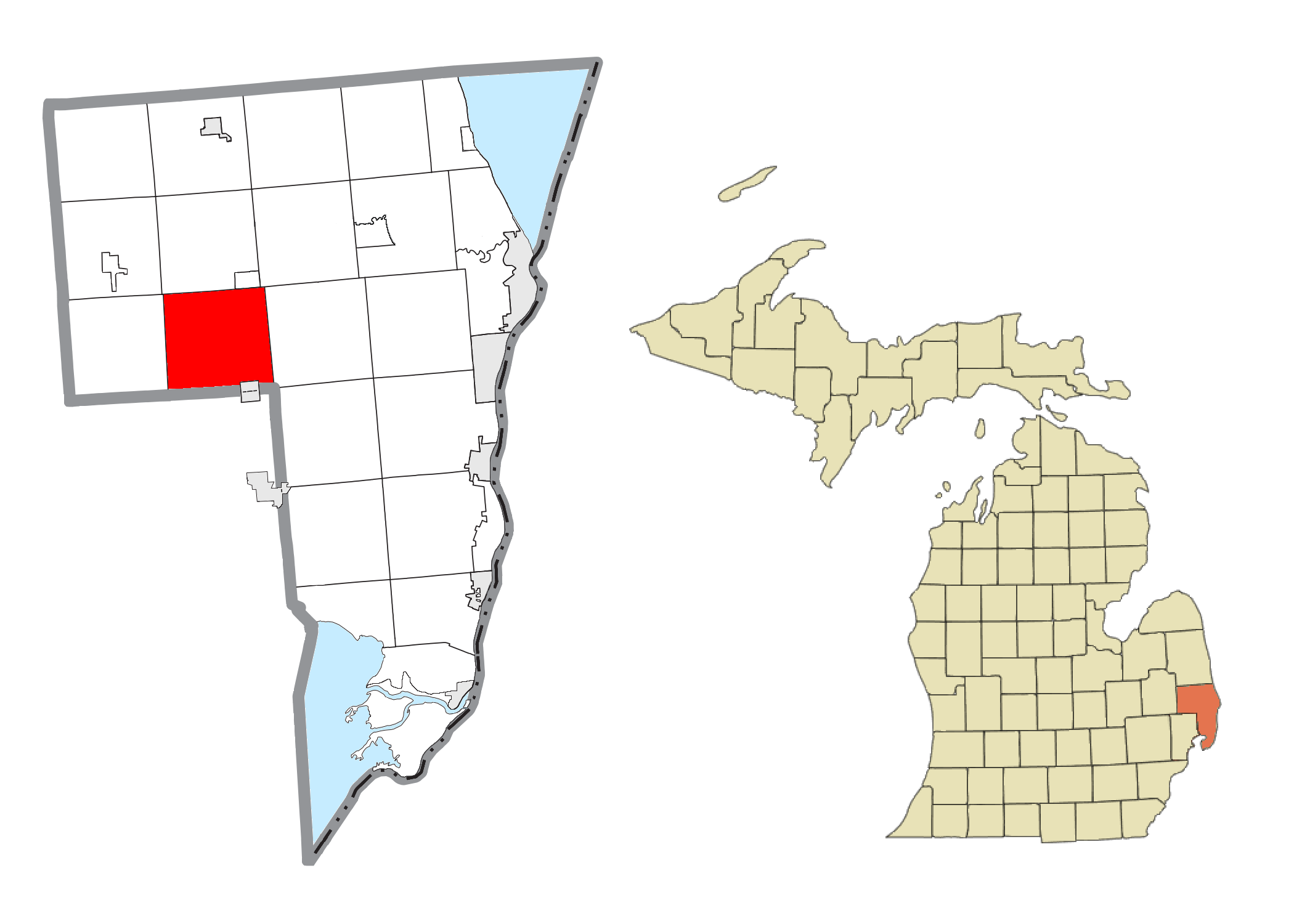
- Location within St. Clair County

- Location within the state of Michigan Location within the United States
- Coordinates: 42°56′52″N 82°48′25″W
- Country: United States
- State: Michigan
- County: St. Clair
- Established: 1841

Government
  - Supervisor: Martin Cook
  - Clerk: Patricia Gondert

Area
  - Total: 38.32 sq mi (99.25 km^{2})
  - Land: 38.23 sq mi (99.02 km^{2})
  - Water: 0.089 sq mi (0.23 km^{2})
- Elevation: 784 ft (239 m)

Population (2020)
  - Total: 3,199
  - Density: 83.7/sq mi (32.3/km^{2})
- Time zone: UTC-5 (Eastern (EST))
  - Summer (DST): UTC-4 (EDT)
- ZIP code(s): 48022 (Emmett); 48041 (Memphis)
- Area code: 810
- FIPS code: 26-68620
- GNIS feature ID: 1626982
- Website: Official website

Riley Township is a civil township of St. Clair County in the U.S. state of Michigan. The population was 3,199 at the 2020 Census.

== Communities ==
- Doyle was centered on a station on the Port Huron and Northwestern Railroad where it crossed Riley Center Rd. between Boardman Rd. and Hough Rd. It had a post office from 1885 until 1913.
- Riley Center is an unincorporated community in the central part of the township at 42°56′27″N 82°50′30″W and includes the township hall. It is about 5 miles northwest of Memphis, the largest town in the area.
- Memphis is a city on the southern boundary of the township with Richmond Township in Macomb County. The city incorporated some land from the township, but is administratively autonomous. The Memphis ZIP code 48041 serves all of Riley Township as well as a portion of Richmond Township.
- The village of Emmett is adjacent to the northeast corner of the township.

== History ==
Riley Township was organized in 1841 and named for John Riley, a mixed-race Chippewa whose father had bought land in the area in 1836 and given John a lease on the land for six cents a year. A post office operated from June 1867 until September 1933.

== Geography ==
According to the United States Census Bureau, the township has a total area of 38.3 square miles (99.2 km^{2}), of which 38.3 square miles (99.1 km^{2}) is land and 0.04 square mile (0.1 km^{2}) (0.05%) is water.

== Demographics ==
As of the census of 2000, there were 3,046 people, 1,020 households, and 854 families residing in the township. The population density was 79.6 inhabitants per square mile (30.7/km^{2}). There were 1,044 housing units at an average density of 27.3 per square mile (10.5/km^{2}). The racial makeup of the township was 97.50% White, 0.49% African American, 0.10% Native American, 0.16% Asian, 0.39% from other races, and 1.35% from two or more races. Hispanic or Latino of any race were 1.58% of the population.

There were 1,020 households, out of which 42.5% had children under the age of 18 living with them, 75.1% were married couples living together, 5.4% had a female householder with no husband present, and 16.2% were non-families. 12.5% of all households were made up of individuals, and 3.9% had someone living alone who was 65 years of age or older. The average household size was 2.97 and the average family size was 3.26.

In the township the population was spread out, with 29.2% under the age of 18, 6.2% from 18 to 24, 34.5% from 25 to 44, 22.1% from 45 to 64, and 8.0% who were 65 years of age or older. The median age was 35 years. For every 100 females, there were 111.4 males. For every 100 females age 18 and over, there were 109.2 males.

The median income for a household in the township was $63,790, and the median income for a family was $65,919. Males had a median income of $50,955 versus $27,679 for females. The per capita income for the township was $22,381. About 2.6% of families and 3.4% of the population were below the poverty line, including 1.4% of those under age 18 and 14.2% of those age 65 or over.

== Historic Structures ==
The Masters Road / Belle River Bridge was built in the 1930s. It is a representative example of bridges produced by Depression-era relief programs. It was built by J.H. Baker and Sons for a cost of $9,391.
