= M-136 (Michigan highway) =

State highway in St. Clair County, Michigan, United States

M-136
- M-136 highlighted in red

Route information
- Maintained by MDOT
- Length: 17.033 mi (27.412 km)
- Existed: 1931–present

Major junctions
- West end: M-19 at Brockway
- East end: M-25 / LHCT near Fort Gratiot

Location
- Country: United States
- State: Michigan
- Counties: St. Clair

Highway system
- Michigan State Trunkline Highway System; Interstate; US; State; Byways
← M-135	→ M-137

M-136 is a state trunkline highway in the US state of Michigan that runs from Brockway to Fort Gratiot in the lower part of The Thumb of the Lower Peninsula. The highway serves as a connector between M-19 on the west and M-25 northwest of Port Huron. In between, the highway runs through rural St. Clair County through farm fields and along a creek and river. The trunkline uses roads that were part of the state highway system in 1919. The M-136 designation was assigned in 1931 and extended to its current length in 1961.

== Route description ==
M-136 begins at a junction with M-19 just south of Brockway on the north side of Mill Creek. The highway heads eastward through farm fields on Metcalf Road for about two-thirds mile (1.1 km) before bending to the southeast on Beard Road, parallel to the creek. The road then turns eastward on Avoca Road near Tackaberry Airport and heads toward Avoca. The trunkline continues in this direction through farm fields and the community of Avoca before turning southward on Glyshaw Road near the Black River. M-136 turns east, returning to Beard Road, and running through a wooded area to cross the river. From here, it continues through farm fields again on a generally east-southeast track on North and Keewahdin roads as it heads towards Gardendale. The highway then branches southeastward on Pine Grove Avenue to connect with M-25 two miles (3.2 km) from Interstate 94 (I-94) and I-69 and their international border crossing on the Blue Water Bridge in Port Huron.

Like other state highways in Michigan, M-136 is maintained by the Michigan Department of Transportation (MDOT). In 2011, the department's traffic surveys showed that on average, 6,070 vehicles used the highway daily on the eastern segment along Beard Road and 1,894 vehicles did so each day near the western terminus, the highest and lowest counts along the highway, respectively. No section of M-136 is listed on the National Highway System, a network of roads important to the country's economy, defense, and mobility.

== History ==
When the state highway system was initially signposted in 1919, the westernmost section of today's M-136 was designated as part of M-19. In 1927, that section of highway was redesignated as M-13 and extended through Avoca. During 1929, the trunkline was extended eastward to terminate at the contemporary M-51 near Gardendale.

M-136 was commissioned in 1931 to replace M-13 between what was M-19 and M-51. The highway was fully paved in 1940 as the last section of gravel road was hard-surfaced through Avoca that year. In 1961, M-136 was extended further east to replace the section of M-51 between Gardendale and Fort Gratiot on present day Pine Grove Avenue.

== Major intersections ==
The entire highway is in St. Clair County.

Location	mi	km	Destinations	Notes
Brockway	0.000	0.000	M-19 – Sandusky, Richmond	
Fort Gratiot	17.033	27.412	M-25 / LHCT – Lexington, Port Sanilac, Port Huron	
1.000 mi = 1.609 km; 1.000 km = 0.621 mi
