= Clyde Township, St. Clair County, Michigan =

Clyde Township, Michigan
- Civil township
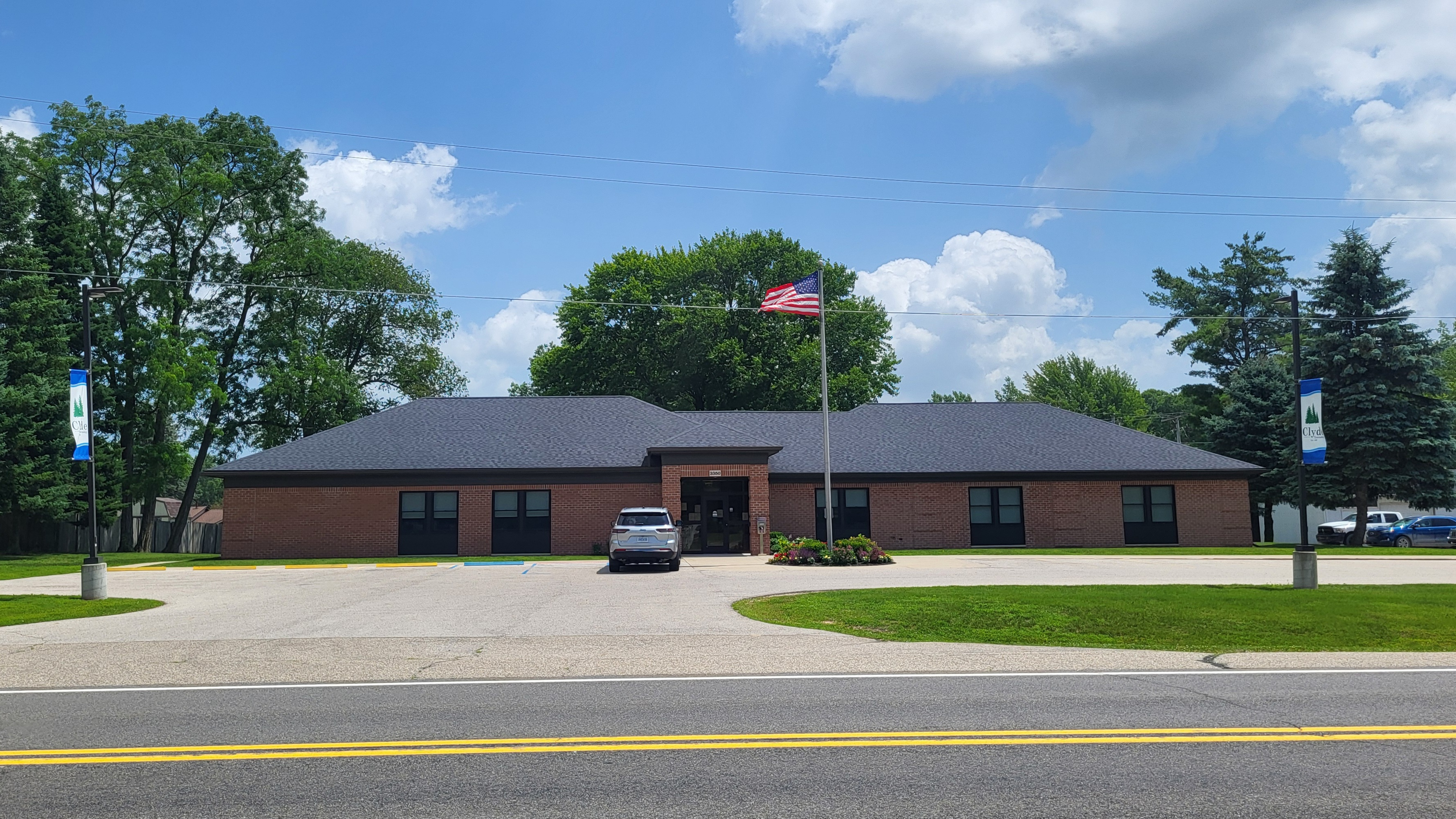
- Clyde Township Offices

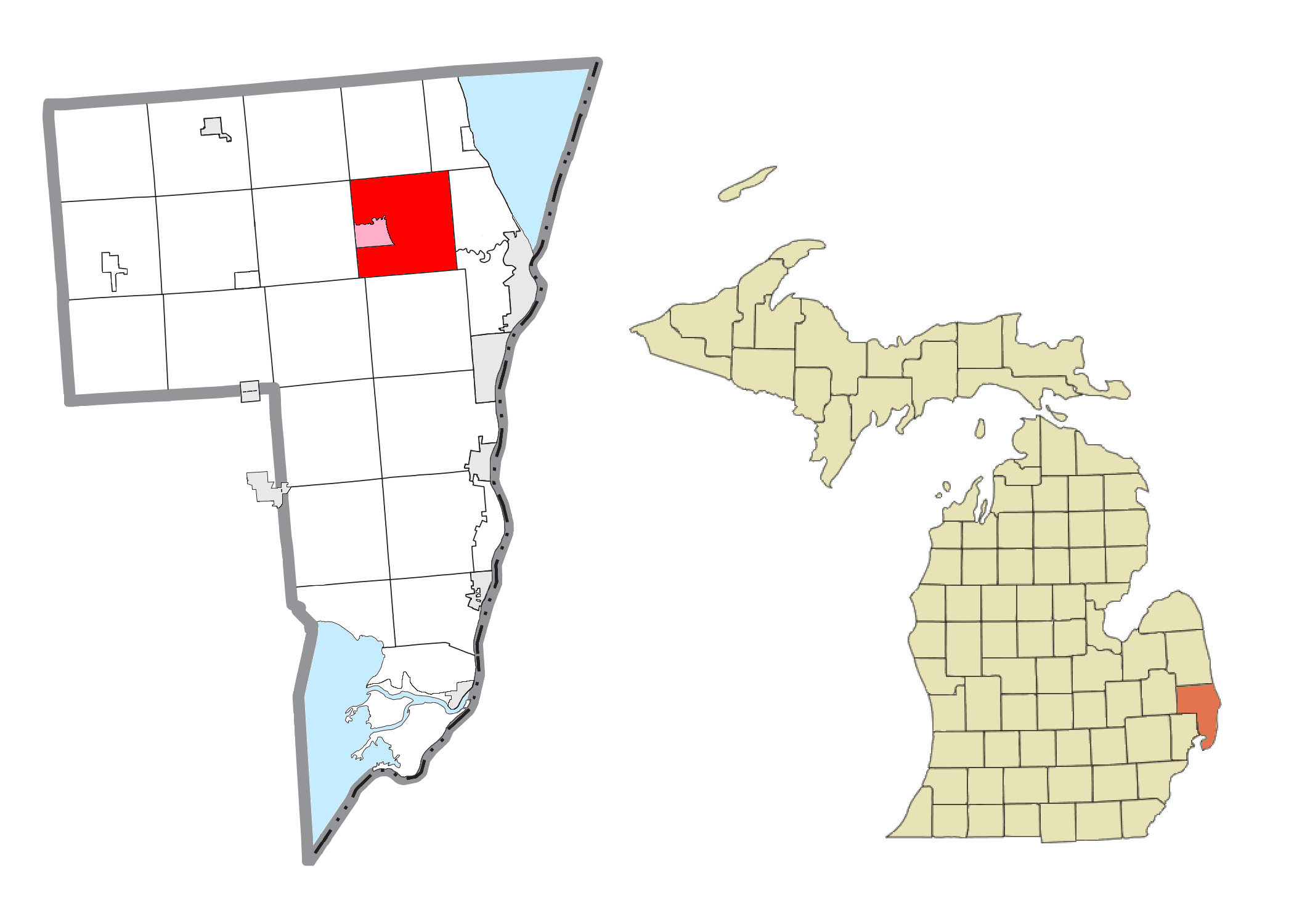
- Location within St. Clair County (red) and the administered CDP of Ruby (pink)

- Location within the state of Michigan Location within the United States
- Coordinates: 43°02′20″N 82°35′17″W
- Country: United States
- State: Michigan
- County: St. Clair
- Established: 1836

Government
  - Supervisor: Ernie Manoleas
  - Clerk: Stacey Smith

Area
  - Total: 35.98 sq mi (93.19 km^{2})
  - Land: 35.65 sq mi (92.33 km^{2})
  - Water: 0.33 sq mi (0.85 km^{2})
- Elevation: 696 ft (212 m)

Population (2020)
  - Total: 5,523
  - Density: 154.9/sq mi (59.8/km^{2})
- Time zone: UTC-5 (Eastern (EST))
  - Summer (DST): UTC-4 (EDT)
- ZIP code(s): 48074 (Smiths Creek); 48049 (North Street)
- Area code: 810
- FIPS code: 26-16760
- GNIS feature ID: 1626104
- Website: Official website

Clyde Township is a civil township of St. Clair County in the U.S. state of Michigan. The population was 5,523 at the 2020 Census.

The township is named for the River Clyde in Scotland. In 1825, a Scotsman Robert Smart, with the backing of Detroit interests, built a mill on the Black River. Smart named the place "Clyde Mills", after the river in where he had lived as a boy. Clyde Township was organized in March 1836 and took its name from the settlement. When first organized, Clyde Township encompassed the area of what are now 20 townships. When Kimball Township was set off in 1855, the settlement by which Clyde Township derived its name became part of a different township. The settlement in Kimball Township is now known as Wadhams.

== Communities ==
The Township has a number of unincorporated communities:

- Abbottsford on the western boundary with Kenockee Township.
- Atkins is in the north central part of the township on Wildcat Road at 43°03′47″N 82°34′37″W (Elevation: 735 ft./224 m.). It was first settled by Allen Atkins in 1837 and William Atkins in 1839. It was a station on the Pere Marquette Railway. A post office operated from April 1873 until June 1935.
- North Street is a location in the eastern part of the township at 43°03′29″N 82°31′38″W on North Road south of Carrigan Road. It was a station on the Pere Marquette Railway, so named because it was located on North street on the section that is currently a part of M-136. A post office operated from April 1879 until May 1879 and was restored in June 1884. The North Street ZIP code, 48049, serves almost all of Clyde Township as well as a small portion of Port Huron Township south of the Black River. "Clyde, Michigan" and "Ruby, Michigan" are also acceptable city names for the 48049 ZIP code.
- Ruby is an unincorporated community and census-designated place the west central part of the township at Brott and Abbottsford Roads 43°02′32″N 82°36′27″W. A post office operated from September 1854 until January 1907.

== Geography ==
According to the United States Census Bureau, the township has a total area of 36.0 square miles (93 km^{2}), of which 35.9 square miles (93 km^{2}) is land and 0.1 square miles (0.26 km^{2}) (0.33%) is water.

== Demographics ==
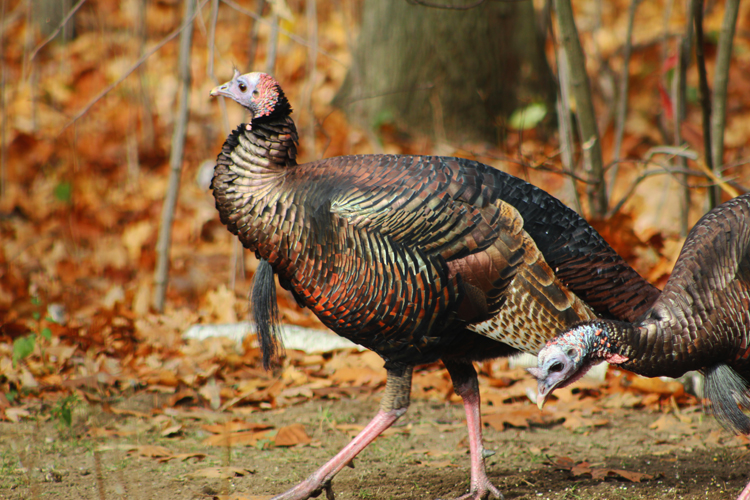
Wild Turkeys populate Clyde Township around the Black River Valley.

As of the census of 2000, there were 5,523 people, 1,931 households, and 1,591 families residing in the township. The population density was 153.9 inhabitants per square mile (59.4/km^{2}). There were 1,989 housing units at an average density of 55.4 per square mile (21.4/km^{2}). The racial makeup of the township was 97.74% White, 0.29% African American, 0.34% Native American, 0.38% Asian, 0.04% Pacific Islander, 0.34% from other races, and 0.87% from two or more races. Hispanic or Latino of any race were 1.27% of the population.

There were 1,931 households, out of which 37.2% had children under the age of 18 living with them, 72.9% were married couples living together, 6.0% had a female householder with no husband present, and 17.6% were non-families. 13.3% of all households were made up of individuals, and 4.6% had someone living alone who was 65 years of age or older. The average household size was 2.85 and the average family size was 3.11.

In the township the population was spread out, with 26.5% under the age of 18, 7.4% from 18 to 24, 28.8% from 25 to 44, 28.1% from 45 to 64, and 9.1% who were 65 years of age or older. The median age was 38 years. For every 100 females, there were 102.5 males. For every 100 females age 18 and over, there were 100.6 males.

The median income for a household in the township was $53,986, and the median income for a family was $60,565. Males had a median income of $43,179 versus $27,026 for females. The per capita income for the township was $22,882. About 4.3% of families and 4.9% of the population were below the poverty line, including 5.7% of those under age 18 and 4.6% of those age 65 or over.
