= North Street Historic District =

North Street Historic District may refer to:

- North Street Historic District (Burlington, Vermont), listed on the National Register of Historic Places (NRHP) in Chittenden County
- North Street Historic District (New Martinsville, West Virginia), NRHP-listed in Wetzel County

== See also ==
- N Street (disambiguation)
