= Cottrellville Township, Michigan =

- Civil township
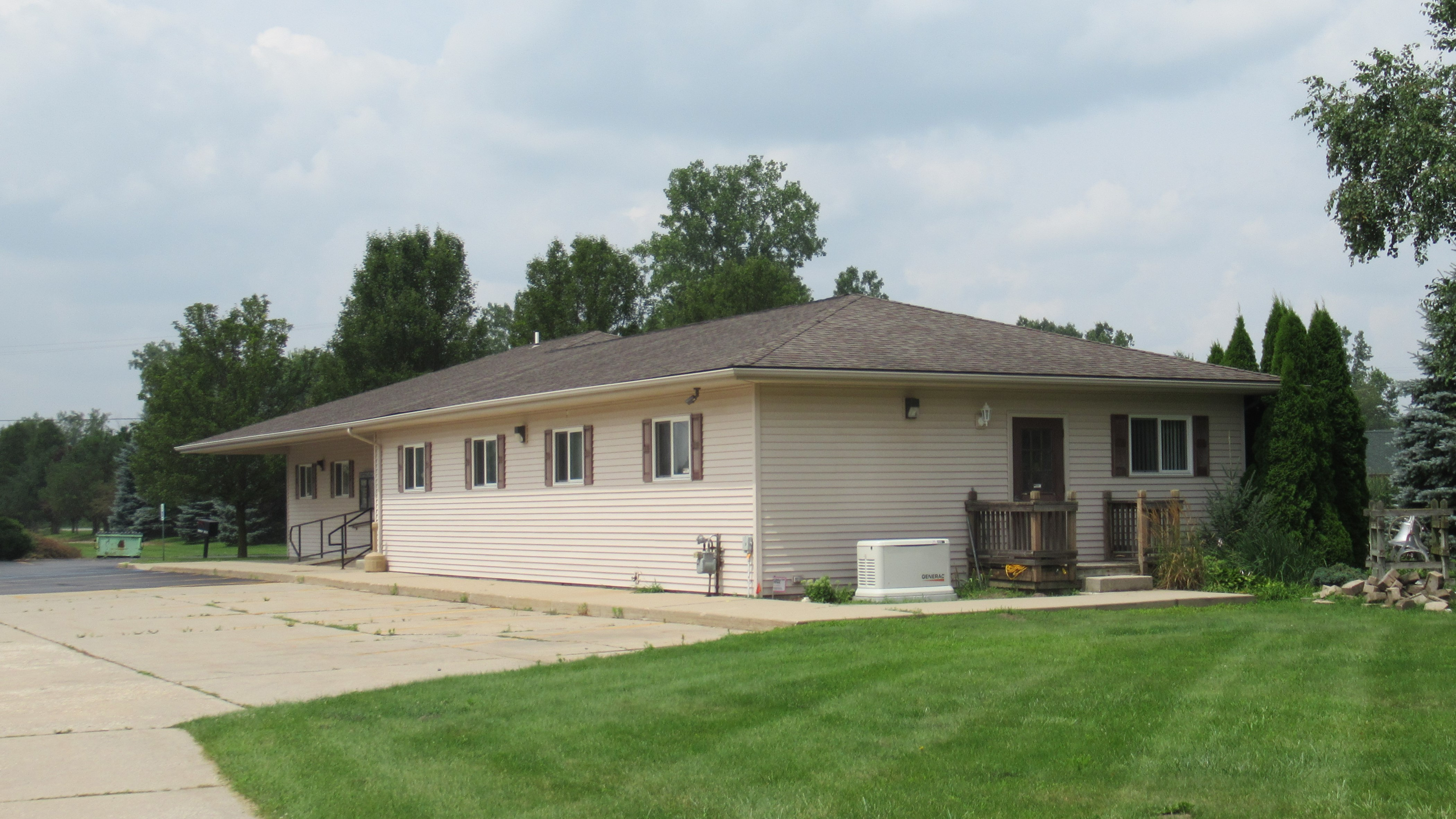
- Cottrellville Township Hall

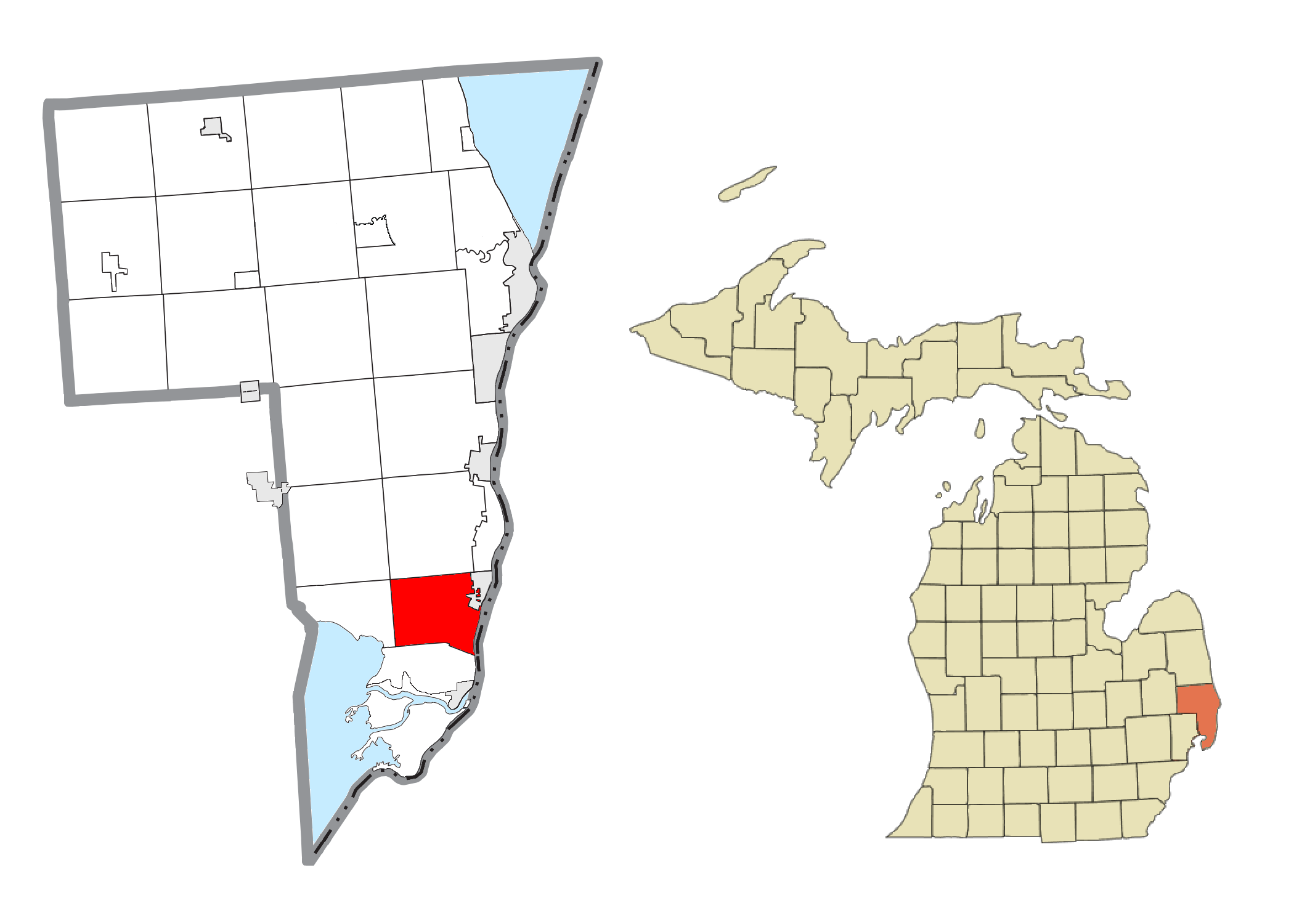
- Location within St. Clair County

- Location within the state of Michigan Location within the United States
- Coordinates: 42°41′33″N 82°32′11″W
- Country: United States
- State: Michigan
- County: St. Clair
- Settled: 1781
- Established: 1822

Government
  - Supervisor: Greg Abbey
  - Clerk: Angela Brelinski

Area
  - Total: 22.42 sq mi (58.07 km^{2})
  - Land: 20.86 sq mi (54.03 km^{2})
  - Water: 1.56 sq mi (4.04 km^{2})
- Elevation: 597 ft (182 m)

Population (2020)
  - Total: 3,406
  - Density: 163.3/sq mi (63.1/km^{2})
- Time zone: UTC-5 (Eastern (EST))
  - Summer (DST): UTC-4 (EDT)
- ZIP code(s): 48039 (Marine City)
- Area code: 810
- FIPS code: 26-18400
- GNIS feature ID: 1626136
- Website: Official website

Cottrellville Township is a civil township of St. Clair County in the U.S. state of Michigan. The population was 3,406 at the 2020 Census.

== Communities ==
There are five unincorporated communities in the Township:

- Avalon Beach is on River Road/M-29 (42°41′20″N 82°30′30″W Elevation: 584 ft.).
- Broadbridge Station is at River Road/M-29 and Broadbridge Road (42°40′43″N 82°30′43″W; Elevation: 581 ft./177 m.).
- Cherry Beach is at River Road/M-29 and Little Avenue (42°41′05″N 82°30′35″W ).
- Martindale Beach is at River Road/M-29 and Paradise Road, south of Marine City (42°41′29″N 82°30′27″W Elevation: 581 ft./177 m.).
- Roberts Landing is at River Road/M-29 and Roberts Road (42°39′35″N 82°30′57″W Elevation: 584 ft./178 m.).
- Starville is on Starville Road from Broadbridge Road to Shea Road(42°40′52″N 82°35′16″W Elevation: m.).

== History ==
Cottrellville was established in 1822. A reference to the Organic Chapter of the general history points out the organization of this town so early as 1822, with A. Hemminger as Supervisor. In the general history also appear the names of its pioneer settlers - the Cotterals (Cottrells), Wards, Browns, etc. The land rises gradually from the river; is fertile, and must be considered among the rich agricultural lands of the county, the marsh, running back from the river, being perhaps the only exception, and this is capable of cultivation. Marine City of Roberts' Landing are the only centers of population in the township. The population in 1845 was 727; in 1854, 1,442; in 1864, 1,930; in 1870, 2,371; and in 1880, 2,904. The equalized valuation is $600,000; number of acres, 13,011, and number of children of school age,

== Geography ==
According to the United States Census Bureau, the township has a total area of 22.4 square miles (58 km^{2}), of which 21.2 square miles (55 km^{2}) is land and 1.2 square miles (3.1 km^{2}) (5.27%) is water.

== Demographics ==
As of the census of 2000, there were 3,814 people, 1,384 households, and 1,055 families residing in the township. The population density was 180.0 inhabitants per square mile (69.5/km^{2}). There were 1,497 housing units at an average density of 70.6 per square mile (27.3/km^{2}). The racial makeup of the township was 98.69% White, 0.08% African American, 0.10% Native American, 0.16% Asian, 0.08% Pacific Islander, and 0.89% from two or more races. Hispanic or Latino of any race were 0.76% of the population.

There were 1,384 households, out of which 35.9% had children under the age of 18 living with them, 63.0% were married couples living together, 8.8% had a female householder with no husband present, and 23.7% were non-families. 19.4% of all households were made up of individuals, and 7.4% had someone living alone who was 65 years of age or older. The average household size was 2.75 and the average family size was 3.16.

In the township the population was spread out, with 27.5% under the age of 18, 7.5% from 18 to 24, 30.6% from 25 to 44, 23.9% from 45 to 64, and 10.5% who were 65 years of age or older. The median age was 37 years. For every 100 females, there were 101.8 males. For every 100 females age 18 and over, there were 99.1 males.

The median income for a household in the township was $47,396, and the median income for a family was $53,750. Males had a median income of $42,418 versus $29,600 for females. The per capita income for the township was $24,510. About 2.5% of families and 2.6% of the population were below the poverty line, including 1.4% of those under age 18 and 6.6% of those age 65 or over.
