= Brockway Township, Michigan =

- Civil township
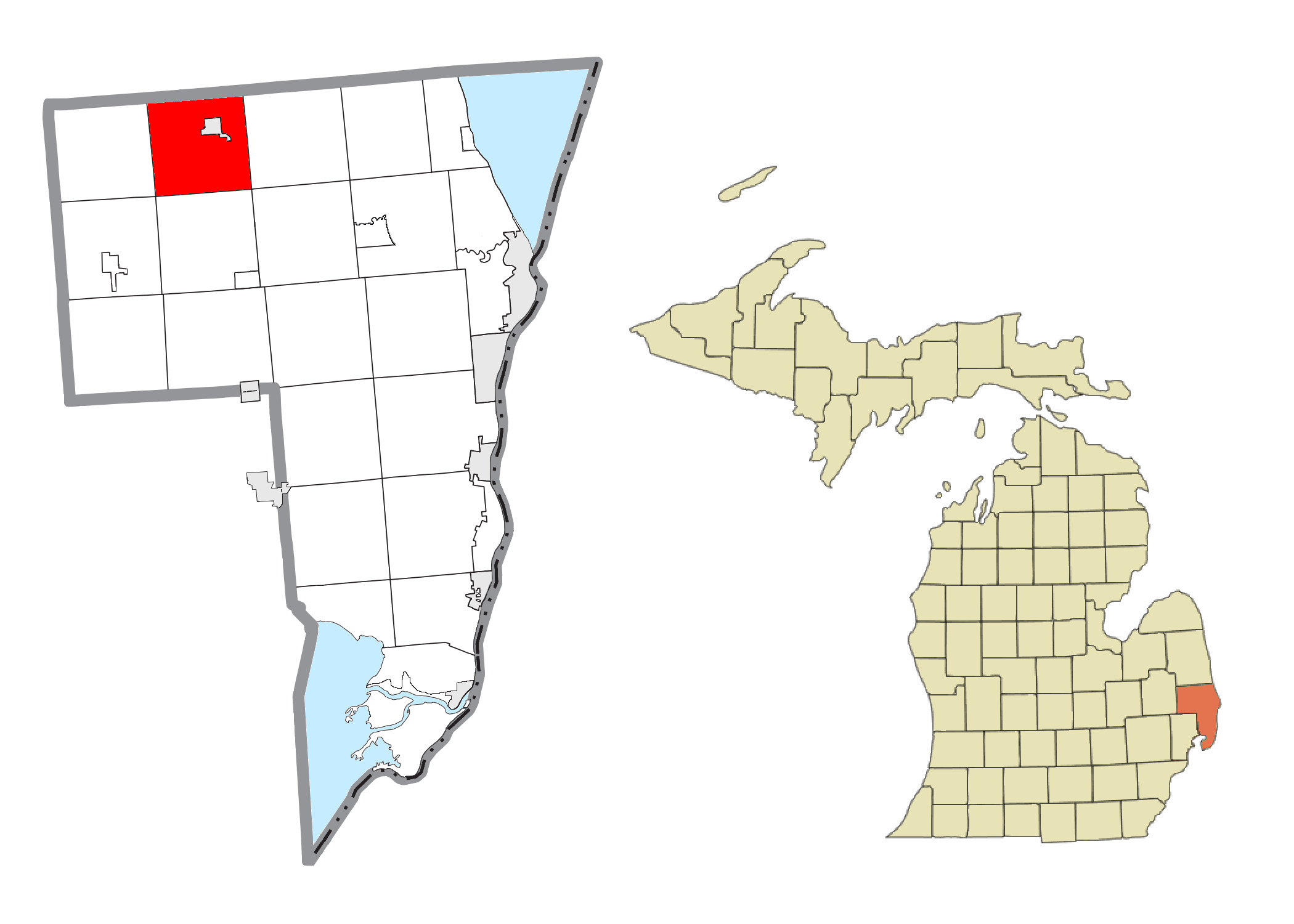
- Location within St. Clair County

- Location within the state of Michigan Location within the United States
- Coordinates: 43°07′20″N 82°48′29″W
- Country: United States
- State: Michigan
- County: St. Clair
- Established: 1848

Government
  - Supervisor: Bill McMurtrie
  - Clerk: Cheryl Wadsworth

Area
  - Total: 33.83 sq mi (87.62 km^{2})
  - Land: 33.66 sq mi (87.18 km^{2})
  - Water: 0.17 sq mi (0.44 km^{2})
- Elevation: 801 ft (244 m)

Population (2020)
  - Total: 1,897
  - Density: 56.4/sq mi (21.8/km^{2})
- Time zone: UTC-5 (Eastern (EST))
  - Summer (DST): UTC-4 (EDT)
- ZIP code(s): 48097 (Yale)
- Area code: 810
- FIPS code: 26-10820
- GNIS feature ID: 1625984
- Website: Official website

Brockway Township is a civil township of St. Clair County in the U.S. state of Michigan. As of the 2020 Census, the township population was 1,897.

== History ==
Brockway Township was established in 1848.

== Community ==
- Brockway is an unincorporated community in the southeastern part of the Township where M-19 and M-136 intersect (43°04′28″N 82°45′56″W) near the border with Emmett Township.
- Canova is an unincorporated community which was established as a lumber town in 1866. It had a post office from 1876 until 1883.

== Geography ==
According to the United States Census Bureau, the township has a total area of 33.9 square miles (88 km^{2}), all land.

== Demographics ==
As of the census of 2000, there were 1,900 people, 637 households, and 540 families residing in the township. The population density was 56.1 inhabitants per square mile (21.7/km^{2}). There were 669 housing units at an average density of 19.7 per square mile (7.6/km^{2}). The racial makeup of the township was 96.89% White, 0.37% African American, 0.32% Native American, 0.32% Asian, 1.16% from other races, and 0.95% from two or more races. Hispanic or Latino of any race were 2.05% of the population.

There were 637 households, out of which 39.6% had children under the age of 18 living with them, 73.2% were married couples living together, 7.8% had a female householder with no husband present, and 15.1% were non-families. 12.4% of all households were made up of individuals, and 5.2% had someone living alone who was 65 years of age or older. The average household size was 2.97 and the average family size was 3.22.

In the township the population was spread out, with 28.7% under the age of 18, 8.0% from 18 to 24, 29.9% from 25 to 44, 24.4% from 45 to 64, and 9.0% who were 65 years of age or older. The median age was 35 years. For every 100 females, there were 100.2 males. For every 100 females age 18 and over, there were 95.5 males.

The median income for a household in the township was $52,361, and the median income for a family was $55,592. Males had a median income of $41,286 versus $30,000 for females. The per capita income for the township was $19,268. About 6.0% of families and 8.0% of the population were below the poverty line, including 12.5% of those under age 18 and 7.0% of those age 65 or over.

== Notable person ==
- Zelda Sears, actress, screenwriter, novelist and businesswoman; born near Brockway (1873–1935)
