= Lynn Township, Michigan =

- Civil township
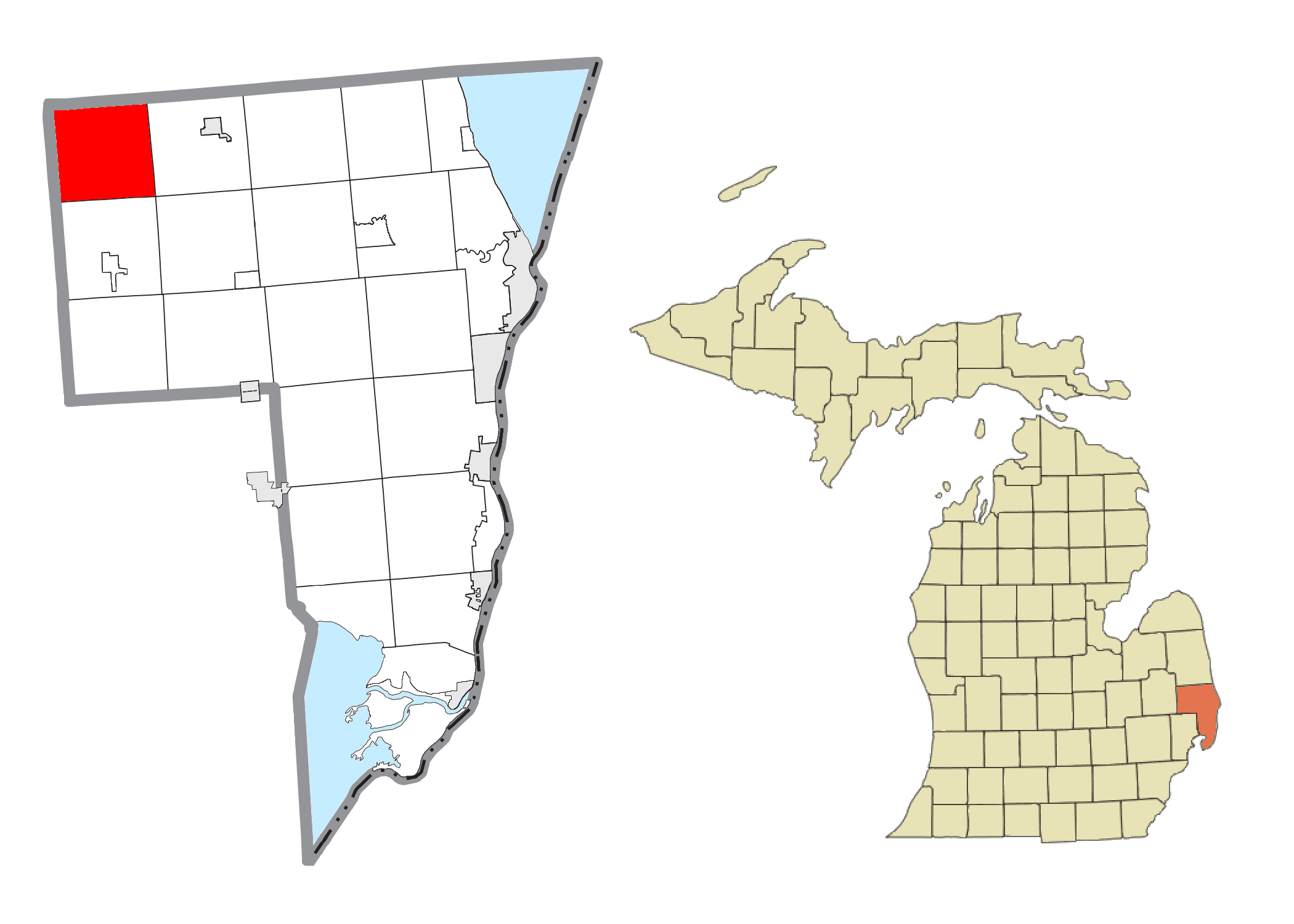
- Location within St. Clair County

- Location within the state of Michigan Location within the United States
- Coordinates: 43°06′54″N 82°55′41″W
- Country: United States
- State: Michigan
- County: St. Clair
- Established: 1850

Government
  - Supervisor: Steve Kalbfleisch
  - Clerk: Annette Ferrett

Area
  - Total: 36.06 sq mi (93.39 km^{2})
  - Land: 35.72 sq mi (92.51 km^{2})
  - Water: 0.34 sq mi (0.88 km^{2})
- Elevation: 791 ft (241 m)

Population (2020)
  - Total: 1,117
  - Density: 31.3/sq mi (12.1/km^{2})
- Time zone: UTC-5 (Eastern (EST))
  - Summer (DST): UTC-4 (EDT)
- ZIP code(s): 48097 (Yale); 48416 (Brown City); 48444 (Imlay City)
- Area code: 810
- FIPS code: 26-49800
- GNIS feature ID: 1626649
- Website: Township website

Lynn Township is a civil township of St. Clair County in the U.S. state of Michigan. The population was 1,117 at the 2020 Census.

== Geography ==
According to the United States Census Bureau, the township has a total area of 36.1 square miles (93 km^{2}), all land.

== Demographics ==
As of the census of 2000, there were 1,187 people, 386 households, and 323 families residing in the township. The population density was 32.9 inhabitants per square mile (12.7/km^{2}). There were 405 housing units at an average density of 11.2 per square mile (4.3/km^{2}). The racial makeup of the township was 96.97% White, 1.60% African American, 0.42% Native American, 0.34% from other races, and 0.67% from two or more races. Hispanic or Latino of any race were 3.37% of the population.

There were 386 households, out of which 41.7% had children under the age of 18 living with them, 75.1% were married couples living together, 5.2% had a female householder with no husband present, and 16.1% were non-families. 14.5% of all households were made up of individuals, and 5.4% had someone living alone who was 65 years of age or older. The average household size was 3.08 and the average family size was 3.39.

In the township the population was spread out, with 30.7% under the age of 18, 7.2% from 18 to 24, 28.1% from 25 to 44, 24.5% from 45 to 64, and 9.4% who were 65 years of age or older. The median age was 36 years. For every 100 females, there were 106.8 males. For every 100 females age 18 and over, there were 104.5 males.

The median income for a household in the township was $52,250, and the median income for a family was $58,281. Males had a median income of $50,789 versus $26,750 for females. The per capita income for the township was $20,250. About 4.9% of families and 5.8% of the population were below the poverty line, including 7.2% of those under age 18 and 1.8% of those age 65 or over.
