= Greenwood Township, St. Clair County, Michigan =

Greenwood Township, Michigan
- Civil township
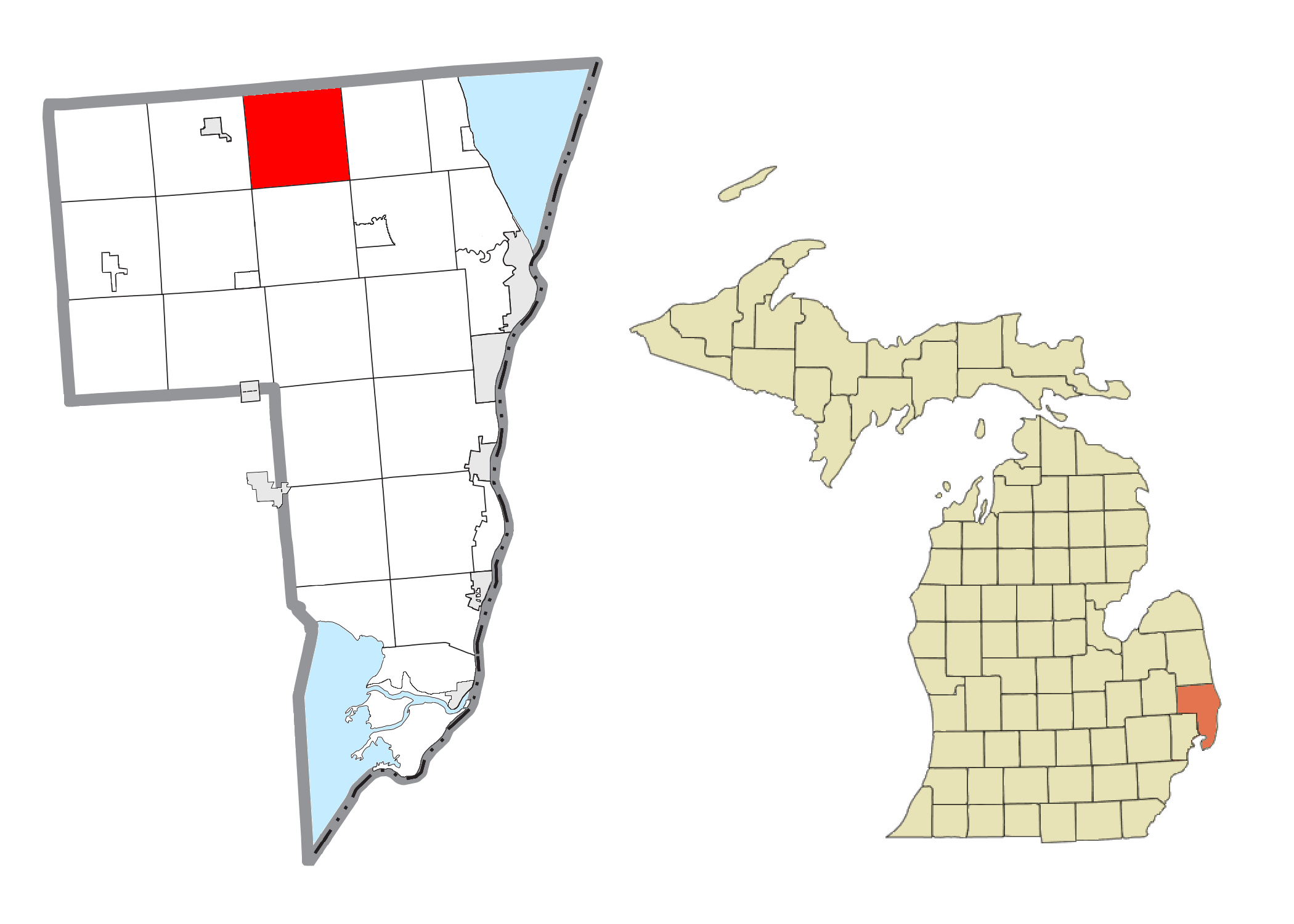
- Location within St. Clair County

- Location within the state of Michigan Location within the United States
- Coordinates: 43°07′41″N 82°41′51″W
- Country: United States
- State: Michigan
- County: St. Clair
- Established: 1855

Government
  - Supervisor: Eric Krikorian
  - Clerk: Sonya O'Brien

Area
  - Total: 35.93 sq mi (93.06 km^{2})
  - Land: 35.80 sq mi (92.72 km^{2})
  - Water: 0.13 sq mi (0.34 km^{2})
- Elevation: 748 ft (228 m)

Population (2020)
  - Total: 1,490
  - Density: 41.6/sq mi (16.1/km^{2})
- Time zone: UTC-5 (Eastern (EST))
  - Summer (DST): UTC-4 (EDT)
- ZIP code(s): 48006 (Avoca)
- Area code: 810
- FIPS code: 26-35220
- GNIS feature ID: 1626405
- Website: Official website

Greenwood Township is a civil township of St. Clair County in the U.S. state of Michigan. The population was 1,490 at the 2020 Census.

== Communities ==
- East Greenwood was a rural postoffice in this township from 1874 until 1905.
- Fargo is an unincorporated community in the southeast part of the township, where Fargo Road crosses the Plum Creek at 43°06′11″N 82°39′33″W. Fargo was a station on the Port Huron and Northwestern Railway. It was named for the local sawmill and grist mill owners, A. Farr & Sons. A post office was in operation from March 1881 until March 1959. Fargo is an acceptable name for the Avoca ZIP code 48006.
- Greenwood Centre was a historical settlement near the center of the township. The township was organized in 1855 and a post office operated from October 1874 until November 1885. Greenwood is an acceptable name for the Avoca ZIP code 48006.

== History ==
Greenwood township was established in 1855.

== Geography ==
According to the United States Census Bureau, the township has a total area of 35.9 square miles (93 km^{2}), of which 35.8 square miles (93 km^{2}) is land and 0.1 square miles (0.26 km^{2}) (0.39%) is water.

== Demographics ==
As of the census of 2000, there were 1,373 people, 470 households, and 384 families residing in the township. The population density was 38.4 inhabitants per square mile (14.8/km^{2}). There were 492 housing units at an average density of 13.8 per square mile (5.3/km^{2}). The racial makeup of the township was 96.07% White, 0.95% African American, 0.51% Native American, 0.36% Asian, 0.51% from other races, and 1.60% from two or more races. Hispanic or Latino of any race were 1.31% of the population.

There were 470 households, out of which 40.6% had children under the age of 18 living with them, 66.8% were married couples living together, 8.5% had a female householder with no husband present, and 18.1% were non-families. 14.7% of all households were made up of individuals, and 5.5% had someone living alone who was 65 years of age or older. The average household size was 2.91 and the average family size was 3.19.

In the township the population was spread out, with 29.5% under the age of 18, 5.9% from 18 to 24, 32.0% from 25 to 44, 22.3% from 45 to 64, and 10.3% who were 65 years of age or older. The median age was 35 years. For every 100 females, there were 107.7 males. For every 100 females age 18 and over, there were 105.5 males.

The median income for a household in the township was $52,604, and the median income for a family was $57,109. Males had a median income of $41,724 versus $26,667 for females. The per capita income for the township was $22,050. About 0.5% of families and 1.8% of the population were below the poverty line, including none of those under age 18 and 2.8% of those age 65 or over.
