= Port Huron Township, Michigan =

- Charter township
- Port Huron Charter Township
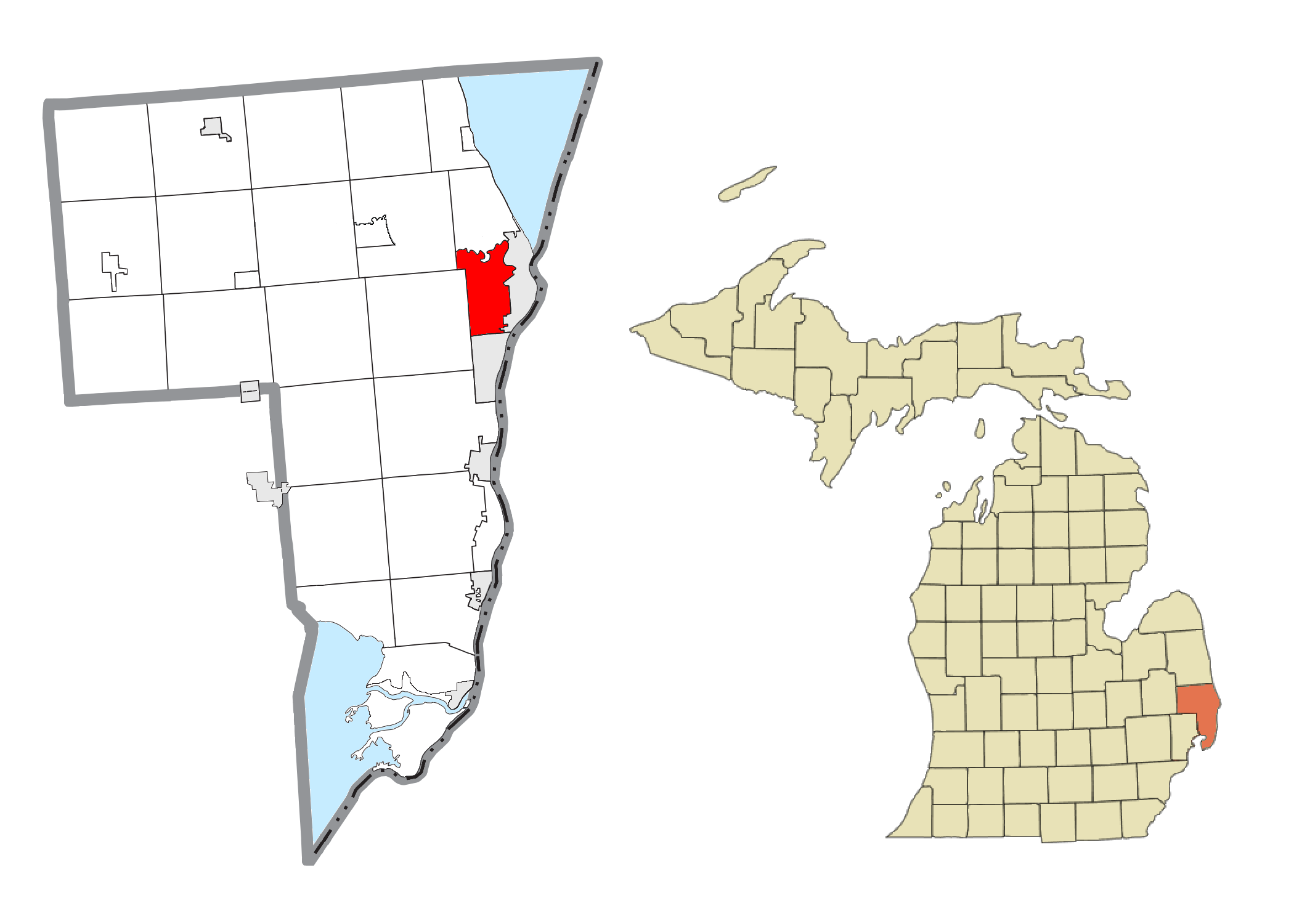
- Location within St. Clair County

- Location within the state of Michigan Location within the United States
- Coordinates: 42°58′01″N 82°28′15″W
- Country: United States
- State: Michigan
- County: St. Clair
- Established: 1827

Government
  - Supervisor: Robert Lewandowski
  - Clerk: Benita Davis

Area
  - Total: 13.14 sq mi (34.03 km^{2})
  - Land: 12.84 sq mi (33.26 km^{2})
  - Water: 0.30 sq mi (0.78 km^{2})
- Elevation: 627 ft (191 m)

Population (2020)
  - Total: 10,792
  - Density: 2,177/sq mi (840.5/km^{2})
- Time zone: UTC-5 (Eastern (EST))
  - Summer (DST): UTC-4 (EDT)
- ZIP code(s): 48060 (Port Huron)
- Area code: 810
- FIPS code: 26-65840
- GNIS feature ID: 1626933
- Website: Official website

Port Huron Charter Township is a charter township of St. Clair County in the U.S. state of Michigan. The population was 10,792 at the 2020 Census. The city of Port Huron is adjacent to the township.

== Communities ==
There are two unincorporated communities in the township:

- South Park is located (42°56′34″N 82°27′23″W ; Elevation: 607 ft./185 m.).
- Tappan is located south of I-69 on Michigan and Griswold roads at the rail tracks (42°57′58″N 82°28′58″W ; Elevation: 620 ft./189 m.).

== Geography ==
According to the United States Census Bureau, the township has a total area of 13.1 square miles (34 km^{2}), of which 12.9 square miles (33 km^{2}) is land and 0.2 square miles (0.52 km^{2}) (1.37%) is water.

== Demographics ==
As of the census of 2000, there were 8,615 people, 3,310 households, and 2,442 families residing in the township. The population density was 666.6 inhabitants per square mile (257.4/km^{2}). There were 3,478 housing units at an average density of 269.1 per square mile (103.9/km^{2}). The racial makeup of the township was 93.63% White, 3.46% African American, 0.62% Native American, 0.35% Asian, 0.02% Pacific Islander, 0.62% from other races, and 1.31% from two or more races. Hispanic or Latino of any race were 2.46% of the population.

There were 3,310 households, out of which 34.2% had children under the age of 18 living with them, 58.2% were married couples living together, 11.7% had a female householder with no husband present, and 26.2% were non-families. 20.6% of all households were made up of individuals, and 7.3% had someone living alone who was 65 years of age or older. The average household size was 2.58 and the average family size was 2.97.

In the township the population was spread out, with 25.8% under the age of 18, 7.7% from 18 to 24, 30.4% from 25 to 44, 23.6% from 45 to 64, and 12.5% who were 65 years of age or older. The median age was 37 years. For every 100 females, there were 97.3 males. For every 100 females age 18 and over, there were 95.0 males.

The median income for a household in the township was $43,978, and the median income for a family was $50,978. Males had a median income of $44,024 versus $23,478 for females. The per capita income for the township was $21,583. About 4.9% of families and 7.4% of the population were below the poverty line, including 7.9% of those under age 18 and 5.7% of those age 65 or over.
