= Emmett, Michigan =

- Village
- Village of Emmett
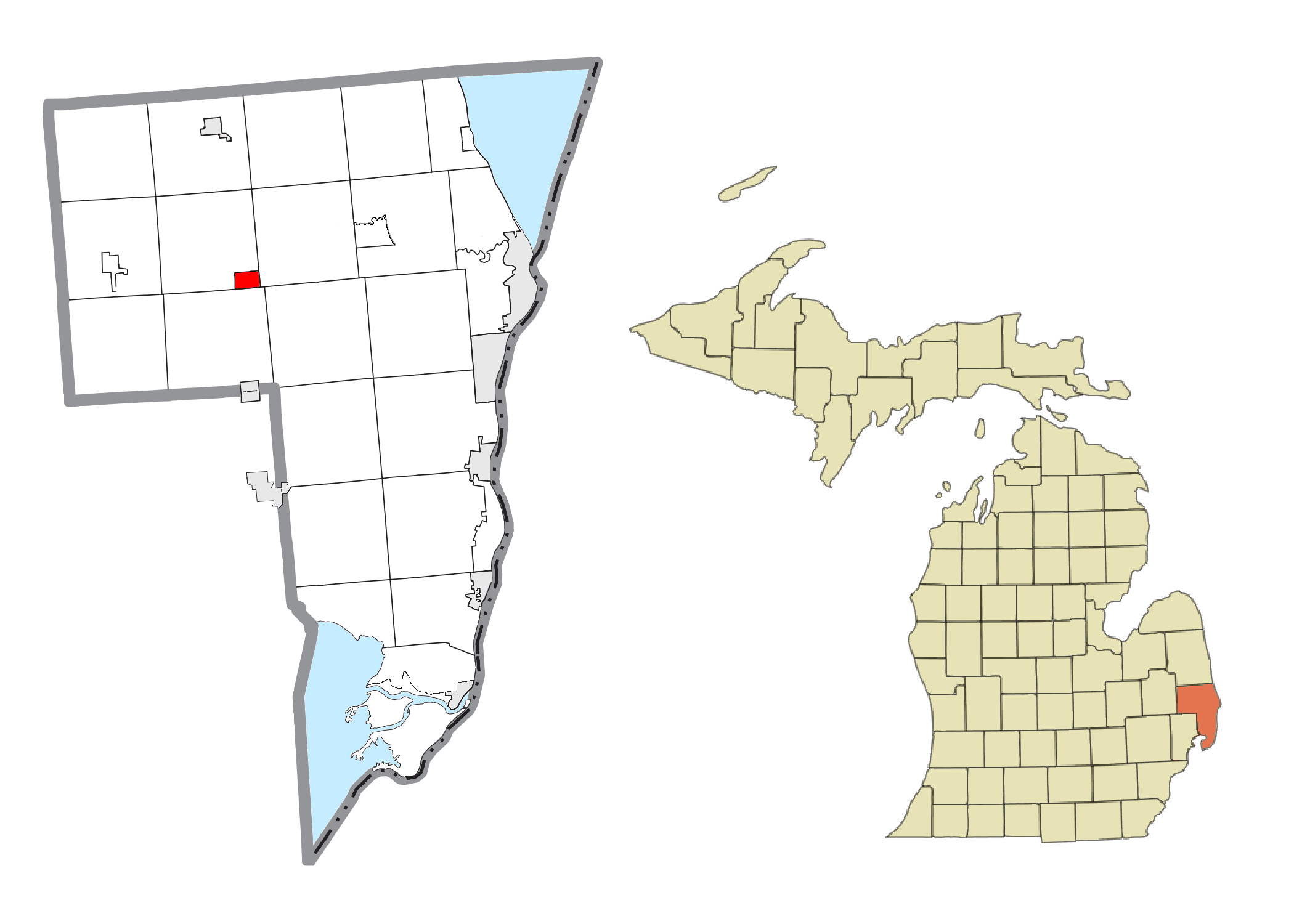
- Location within St. Clair County

- Location within the state of Michigan Location within the United States
- Coordinates: 42°59′42″N 82°45′46″W
- Country: United States
- State: Michigan
- County: St. Clair
- Township: Emmett
- Settled: 1850
- Platted: 1856
- Incorporated: 1883

Government
  - Type: Village council
  - President: Patrick Pierce
  - Clerk: Kathleen Keith-Pratt

Area
  - Total: 1.50 sq mi (3.88 km^{2})
  - Land: 1.50 sq mi (3.88 km^{2})
  - Water: 0 sq mi (0.00 km^{2})
- Elevation: 774 ft (236 m)

Population (2020)
  - Total: 258
  - Density: 172/sq mi (66/km^{2})
- Time zone: UTC-5 (Eastern (EST))
  - Summer (DST): UTC-4 (EDT)
- ZIP code(s): 48022
- Area code: 810
- FIPS code: 26-25940
- GNIS feature ID: 1624511

Emmett is a village in St. Clair County of the U.S. state of Michigan. As of the 2020 census, Emmett had a population of 258. The village is located within Emmett Township.

== Geography ==
According to the United States Census Bureau, the village has a total area of 1.51 square miles (3.91 km^{2}), all land. Emmett is located just north of Interstate 69 and is in the central part of St. Clair County.

== Demographics ==
Historical population
Census	Pop.	Note	%±
1900	265		—
1910	292		10.2%
1920	175		−40.1%
1930	199		13.7%
1940	229		15.1%
1950	230		0.4%
1960	283		23.0%
1970	297		4.9%
1980	285		−4.0%
1990	297		4.2%
2000	251		−15.5%
2010	269		7.2%
2020	258		−4.1%
U.S. Decennial Census

=== 2010 census ===
As of the census of 2010, there were 269 people, 91 households, and 74 families living in the village. The population density was 178.1 inhabitants per square mile (68.8/km^{2}). There were 96 housing units at an average density of 63.6 per square mile (24.6/km^{2}). The racial makeup of the village was 93.7% White, 0.7% Asian, 0.7% Pacific Islander, 3.3% from other races, and 1.5% from two or more races. Hispanic or Latino of any race were 3.3% of the population.

There were 91 households, of which 37.4% had children under the age of 18 living with them, 64.8% were married couples living together, 11.0% had a female householder with no husband present, 5.5% had a male householder with no wife present, and 18.7% were non-families. 16.5% of all households were made up of individuals, and 8.8% had someone living alone who was 65 years of age or older. The average household size was 2.96 and the average family size was 3.26.

The median age in the village was 38.4 years. 29% of residents were under the age of 18; 5.3% were between the ages of 18 and 24; 23.7% were from 25 to 44; 26.8% were from 45 to 64; and 15.2% were 65 years of age or older. The gender makeup of the village was 53.2% male and 46.8% female.

=== 2000 census ===
As of the census of 2000, there were 251 people, 87 households, and 66 families living in the village. The population density was 168.4 inhabitants per square mile (65.0/km^{2}). There were 93 housing units at an average density of 62.4 per square mile (24.1/km^{2}). The racial makeup of the village was 99.60% White and 0.40% Native American. Hispanic or Latino of any race were 0.40% of the population.

Many of the residents of Emmett have Irish heritage, most of which can trace family members back to Ireland.

There were 87 households, out of which 32.2% had children under the age of 18 living with them, 66.7% were married couples living together, 6.9% had a female householder with no husband present, and 23.0% were non-families. 20.7% of all households were made up of individuals, and 2.3% had someone living alone who was 65 years of age or older. The average household size was 2.89 and the average family size was 3.42.

In the village, the population was spread out, with 30.3% under the age of 18, 8.8% from 18 to 24, 29.1% from 25 to 44, 20.7% from 45 to 64, and 11.2% who were 65 years of age or older. The median age was 35 years. For every 100 females, there were 100.8 males. For every 100 females age 18 and over, there were 103.5 males.

The median income for a household in the village was $50,536, and the median income for a family was $52,250. Males had a median income of $41,563 versus $22,188 for females. The per capita income for the village was $16,500. None of the families and 1.2% of the population were living below the poverty line.

== Economy ==
The surrounding community is mostly agricultural. Emmett houses the Eastern Michigan Grain Elevator, the largest in St. Clair County, Michigan. It has recently merged with Star of the West Milling Co. of Vassar and Cass City. Most of the population commutes to larger cities such as Richmond, Port Huron, and Imlay City.
