= St. Clair County, Michigan =

County in Michigan, United States

- County
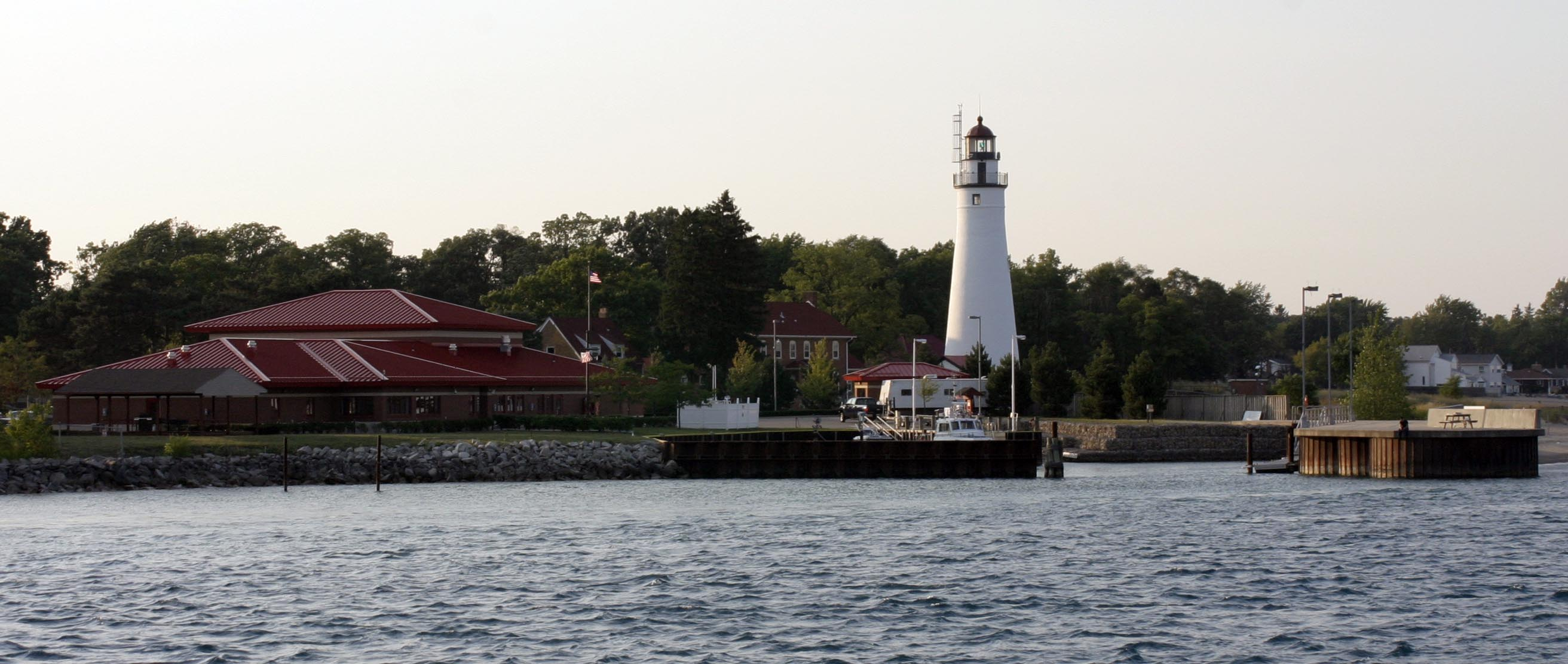
- Fort Gratiot Light

- Flag Seal

- Location within the U.S. state of Michigan
- Coordinates: 42°56′N 82°40′W
- Country: United States
- State: Michigan
- Founded: March 28, 1820 (created); 1821 (organized)
- Named for: St. Clare of Assisi
- Seat: Port Huron
- Largest city: Port Huron

Area
  - Total: 837 sq mi (2,170 km^{2})
  - Land: 721 sq mi (1,870 km^{2})
  - Water: 115 sq mi (300 km^{2}) 14%

Population (2020)
  - Total: 160,383
  - Estimate (2025): 160,486 ▲
  - Density: 190/sq mi (73/km^{2})
- Time zone: UTC−5 (Eastern)
  - Summer (DST): UTC−4 (EDT)
- Area code: 810
- Congressional district: 9th
- Website: www.stclaircounty.org

St. Clair County is a county located in the U.S. state of Michigan and bordering the west bank of the St. Clair River. As of the 2020 census, the population was 160,383. It is the 13th-most populous county in the state. The county seat is Port Huron, located at the north end of the St. Clair River at Lake Huron. The county was created September 10, 1820, and its government was organized in 1821. It is located northeast of Detroit. It is considered by the State of Michigan to be a part of The Thumb, a peninsula that is surrounded by Lake Huron in the east-central area of the state. This area is sometimes dubbed the Blue Water Area.

== Etymology ==
French explorer René-Robert Cavelier, Sieur de La Salle led an expedition to this area on August 12, 1679. They named the lake as Lac Sainte-Claire, because it was the feast day of Saint Clare of Assisi, whom they venerated. English mapmakers adopted the French name, identifying the lake feature as Saint Clare on maps dated as early as 1710. By the Mitchell Map of 1755, the spelling was given as St. Clair, which later became the current version in 1924. Located along the western shores of Lake St. Clair and the St. Clair River, the county was named for them by European-American settlers.

The name is sometimes mistakenly attributed to honoring Arthur St. Clair, an American Revolutionary War general and governor of the Northwest Territory, but it was established long before he was considered a notable figure. The earlier spelling of the lake's name may have been conflated with English practice and the name of the general, as several political jurisdictions near the lake and the river, such as St. Clair County, St. Clair Township, and the cities of St. Clair and St. Clair Shores, share this spelling (see List of Michigan county name etymologies).

The name has sometimes been mistakenly attributed to honoring Patrick Sinclair, a British officer who purchased land on the St. Clair River at the mouth of the Pine River. In 1764, he built Fort Sinclair there, which was in use for nearly 20 years before being abandoned. As noted, the name was established before he was active in the area.

== Geography ==
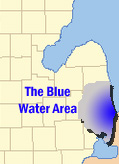
St. Clair County is also called the Blue Water Area.

According to the U.S. Census Bureau, the county has a total area of 837 square miles (2,170 km^{2}), of which 721 square miles (1,870 km^{2}) is land and 115 square miles (300 km^{2}) (14%) is water. St. Clair County is one of five counties that form the peninsula, known as the Thumb, that projects into Lake Huron. St. Clair County is closely connected in terms of economy with its neighbors, Metro Detroit and Sanilac County in Michigan, and Lambton County across the river in Ontario, Canada. Saint Clair County is the principal county in The Blue Water Area, a sub-region of the Thumb.

=== Adjacent counties ===
- Sanilac (north)
- Lapeer (west)
- Macomb (south)
- Lambton, Ontario (east)

=== Major highways ===
- I-69 enters the county from the west, coming from Lansing and Flint, terminating at the approach to the Blue Water Bridge in Port Huron. (Once fully completed, the mainline of I-69 will span from Brownsville, Texas to Port Huron, Michigan.)
- I-94 enters St. Clair County from the southwest, having traversed the entire Metro Detroit region, and terminates at the approach to the Blue Water Bridge in Port Huron. On the Canadian side of the border, in Sarnia, Ontario, the route heads easterly, designated as Highway 402.
- BL I-69
- BL I-94
- M-19
- M-25 follows the Lake Huron–Saginaw Bay shoreline, beginning in Bay City and ending at a junction with |I-94/|I-69, and BL I-94/BL I-69 on the north side of Port Huron.
- M-29
- M-136
- M-154 serves Harsens Island, in Lake St. Clair.

== Demographics ==
Historical population
Census	Pop.	Note	%±
1830	1,114		—
1840	4,606		313.5%
1850	10,420		126.2%
1860	26,604		155.3%
1870	36,661		37.8%
1880	46,197		26.0%
1890	52,105		12.8%
1900	55,228		6.0%
1910	52,341		−5.2%
1920	58,009		10.8%
1930	67,563		16.5%
1940	76,222		12.8%
1950	91,599		20.2%
1960	107,201		17.0%
1970	120,175		12.1%
1980	138,802		15.5%
1990	145,607		4.9%
2000	164,235		12.8%
2010	163,040		−0.7%
2020	160,383		−1.6%
2025 (est.)	160,486	▲	0.1%
U.S. Decennial Census; 1790–1960 1900–1990; 1990–2000 2010–2019

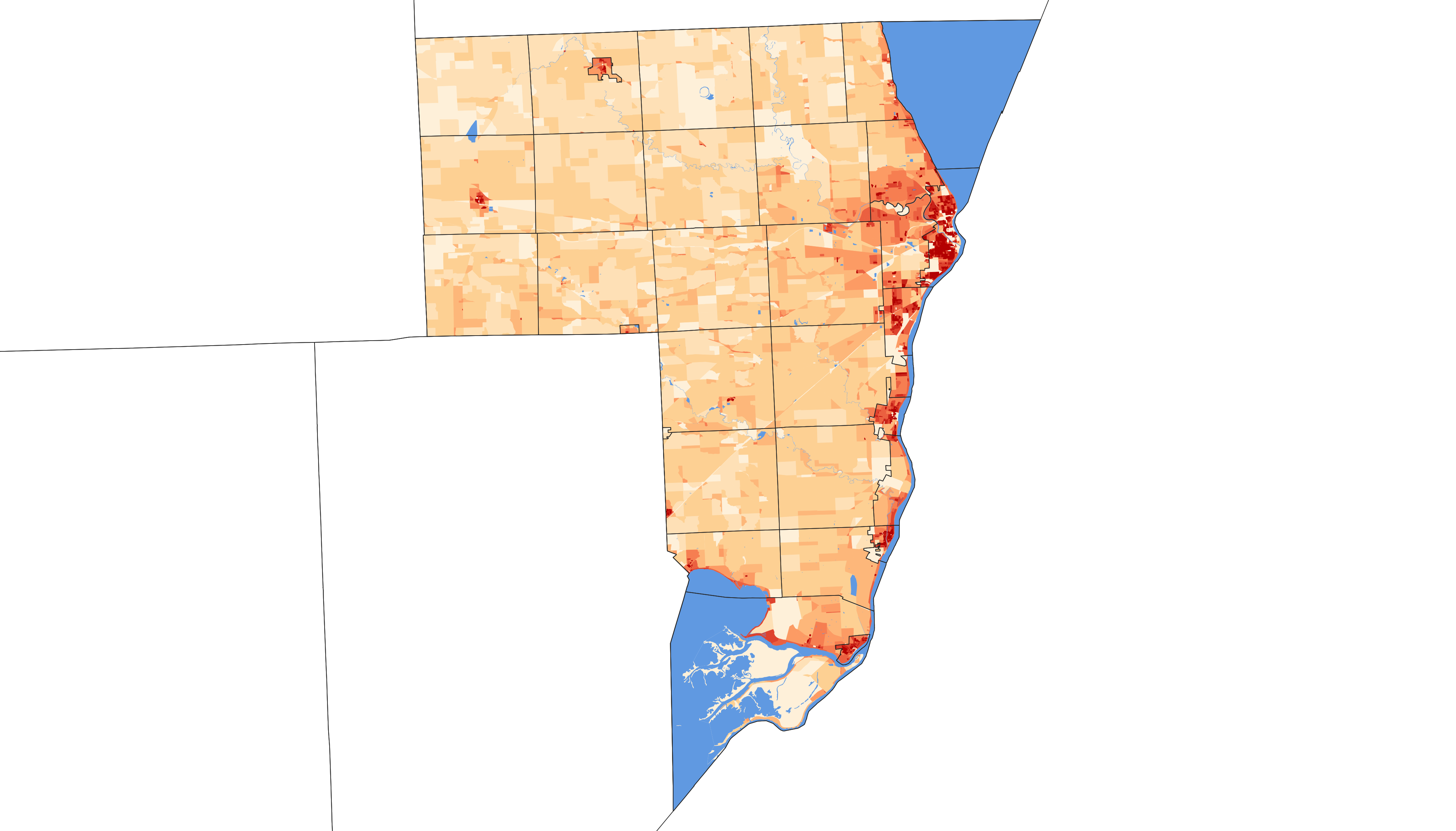
2020 population density of St. Clair County MI by census block

=== Racial and ethnic composition ===
St. Clair County, Michigan – Racial and ethnic composition Note: the US Census treats Hispanic/Latino as an ethnic category. This table excludes Latinos from the racial categories and assigns them to a separate category. Hispanics/Latinos may be of any race.
Race / Ethnicity (NH = Non-Hispanic)	Pop 1980	Pop 1990	Pop 2000	Pop 2010	Pop 2020	% 1980	% 1990	% 2000	% 2010	% 2020
White alone (NH)	132,977	138,894	153,893	150,213	142,396	95.80%	95.39%	93.70%	92.13%	88.78%
Black or African American alone (NH)	2,761	2,942	3,381	3,860	3,773	1.99%	2.02%	2.06%	2.37%	2.35%
Native American or Alaska Native alone (NH)	558	698	742	647	561	0.40%	0.48%	0.45%	0.40%	0.35%
Asian alone (NH)	302	458	637	763	809	0.22%	0.31%	0.39%	0.47%	0.50%
Native Hawaiian or Pacific Islander alone (NH)	x	x	26	27	13	x	x	0.02%	0.02%	0.01%
Other race alone (NH)	138	57	81	99	443	0.10%	0.04%	0.05%	0.06%	0.28%
Mixed race or Multiracial (NH)	x	x	1,882	2,723	6,883	x	x	1.15%	1.67%	4.29%
Hispanic or Latino (any race)	2,066	2,558	3,593	4,708	5,505	1.49%	1.76%	2.19%	2.89%	3.43%
Total	138,802	145,607	164,235	163,040	160,383	100.00%	100.00%	100.00%	100.00%	100.00%

=== 2020 census ===
As of the 2020 census, the county had a population of 160,383 and a median age of 44.5 years. 20.5% of residents were under the age of 18 and 19.6% of residents were 65 years of age or older. For every 100 females there were 99.2 males, and for every 100 females age 18 and over there were 97.6 males.

The racial makeup of the county was 90.1% White, 2.5% Black or African American, 0.4% American Indian and Alaska Native, 0.5% Asian, <0.1% Native Hawaiian and Pacific Islander, 0.9% from some other race, and 5.6% from two or more races. Hispanic or Latino residents of any race comprised 3.4% of the population.

60.5% of residents lived in urban areas, while 39.5% lived in rural areas.

There were 65,724 households in the county, of which 26.4% had children under the age of 18 living in them. Of all households, 48.5% were married-couple households, 19.0% were households with a male householder and no spouse or partner present, and 24.5% were households with a female householder and no spouse or partner present. About 28.3% of all households were made up of individuals and 13.0% had someone living alone who was 65 years of age or older.

There were 72,092 housing units, of which 8.8% were vacant. Among occupied housing units, 77.0% were owner-occupied and 23.0% were renter-occupied. The homeowner vacancy rate was 1.2% and the rental vacancy rate was 6.5%.

=== 2010 census ===
The 2010 United States census indicates St. Clair County had a 2010 population of 163,040, a decrease of 1,195 people from the 2000 United States census and an overall growth rate of −0.7% during that decade. In 2010 there were 63,841 households and 44,238 families in the county. The population density was 226.1 per square mile (87.3 per square kilometer). There were 71,822 housing units at an average density of 99.6 per square mile (38.5 per square kilometer).

93.9% were White, 2.4% Black or African American, 0.5% Asian, 0.4% Native American, 0.7% of some other race, and 2.0% of two or more races. 2.9% were Hispanic or Latino (of any race). 25.9% identified as of German, 10.2% Polish, 9.3% Irish, 8.5% English, 6.5% French, 6.5% American, and 5.1% Italian ancestry.

Of the 63,841 households, 31.3% had children under the age of 18 living with them, 52.9% were opposite-sex families, 11.4% had a female householder with no husband present, 30.7% were non-families, and 25.5% were made up of individuals. The average household size was 2.52 and the average family size was 3.01.

In the county, 23.7% of the population was under the age of 18, 8.0% was from 18 to 24, 23.8% from 25 to 44, 30.1% from 45 to 64, and 14.5% was 65 years of age or older. The median age was 41 years. For every 100 females, there were 98.1 males. For every 100 females age 18 and over, there were 95.7 males.

The 2010 American Community Survey 1-year estimate indicates the median income for a household in the county was $44,369 and the median income for a family was $53,207. Males had a median income of $30,056 versus $16,771 for females. The per capita income for the county was $22,390. About 10.4% of families and 15.4% of the population were below the poverty line, including 22.7% of those under the age of 18 and 6.8% of those age 65 or over.

== Government ==
The county government operates the jail, maintains rural roads, operates the major local courts, keeps files of deeds and mortgages, maintains vital records, administers public health regulations, and participates with the state in the provision of welfare and other social services. The county board of commissioners controls the budget but has only limited authority to make laws or ordinances. In Michigan, most local government functions — police and fire, building and zoning, tax assessment, street maintenance, etc. — are the responsibility of individual cities and townships.

=== Elected officials ===
- Prosecuting attorney: Michael D. Wendling
- Sheriff: Mat King
- County clerk/register of deeds: Angie Waters
- County treasurer: Kelly Roberts-Burnett
- Drain commissioner: Robert Wiley
- County commissioner, district 1: Steven Simasko
- County commissioner, district 2: Jorja Baldwin
- County commissioner, district 3: Lisa Beedon
- County commissioner, district 4: Joi Torello
- County commissioner, district 5: Jeffrey L. Bohm
- County commissioner, district 6: David Rushing
- County commissioner, district 7: Dave Vandenbossche
- 31st Circuit Court: Cynthia Lane, Michael West, Daniel Damman
- 72nd District Court: Michael Hulewicz; John Monaghan; Mona Armstrong
- Probate Court: Jennifer Deegan; John Tomlinson

(information as of February 2023)

United States presidential election results for St. Clair County, Michigan
Year	Republican		Democratic		Third party(ies)	
Year	No.	%	No.	%	No.	%
1884	4,017	44.21%	4,668	51.38%	401	4.41%
1888	5,419	49.04%	5,286	47.83%	346	3.13%
1892	5,371	48.82%	5,248	47.70%	382	3.47%
1896	7,160	56.86%	5,130	40.74%	303	2.41%
1900	7,432	61.41%	4,403	36.38%	268	2.21%
1904	8,305	69.01%	3,248	26.99%	482	4.00%
1908	7,287	62.23%	3,756	32.08%	666	5.69%
1912	2,958	27.48%	3,008	27.95%	4,798	44.57%
1916	6,538	57.39%	4,617	40.53%	237	2.08%
1920	14,938	75.14%	4,566	22.97%	375	1.89%
1924	17,435	76.54%	3,600	15.80%	1,745	7.66%
1928	18,177	71.57%	7,151	28.15%	71	0.28%
1932	14,883	53.08%	12,776	45.56%	382	1.36%
1936	12,760	45.93%	12,663	45.58%	2,359	8.49%
1940	18,635	60.16%	12,259	39.58%	82	0.26%
1944	19,175	61.61%	11,813	37.96%	135	0.43%
1948	17,883	61.79%	10,647	36.79%	412	1.42%
1952	27,894	69.29%	12,268	30.47%	94	0.23%
1956	29,116	69.46%	12,753	30.42%	51	0.12%
1960	27,366	59.79%	18,332	40.05%	76	0.17%
1964	17,011	40.76%	24,662	59.09%	62	0.15%
1968	21,084	49.41%	16,251	38.09%	5,334	12.50%
1972	28,471	63.05%	15,712	34.79%	976	2.16%
1976	26,311	52.74%	22,734	45.57%	844	1.69%
1980	31,021	55.61%	20,410	36.59%	4,348	7.80%
1984	36,114	67.63%	16,998	31.83%	287	0.54%
1988	32,336	60.26%	20,909	38.97%	413	0.77%
1992	24,508	36.67%	23,385	34.99%	18,939	28.34%
1996	22,495	37.42%	28,881	48.04%	8,742	14.54%
2000	33,571	49.00%	33,002	48.17%	1,943	2.84%
2004	42,740	53.60%	36,174	45.36%	829	1.04%
2008	38,536	47.63%	40,677	50.28%	1,687	2.09%
2012	39,271	52.94%	33,983	45.81%	927	1.25%
2016	49,051	62.88%	24,553	31.48%	4,399	5.64%
2020	59,185	64.19%	31,363	34.02%	1,654	1.79%
2024	64,277	66.59%	30,844	31.95%	1,403	1.45%

United States Senate election results for St. Clair County, Michigan1
Year	Republican		Democratic		Third party(ies)	
Year	No.	%	No.	%	No.	%
2024	59,992	63.53%	31,519	33.38%	2,921	3.09%

Michigan Gubernatorial election results for St. Clair County
Year	Republican		Democratic		Third party(ies)	
Year	No.	%	No.	%	No.	%
2022	42,731	57.35%	30,170	40.49%	1,604	2.15%

== Parks ==
- Algonac State Park

St. Clair County is home to five county parks: Columbus County Park, Fort Gratiot County Park, Fort Gratiot Light station, Goodells County Park, and Woodsong County Park. St. Clair County also operates the Wadhams to Avoca Trail and works with local units of government to develop the Bridge to Bay Trail.

== Communities ==
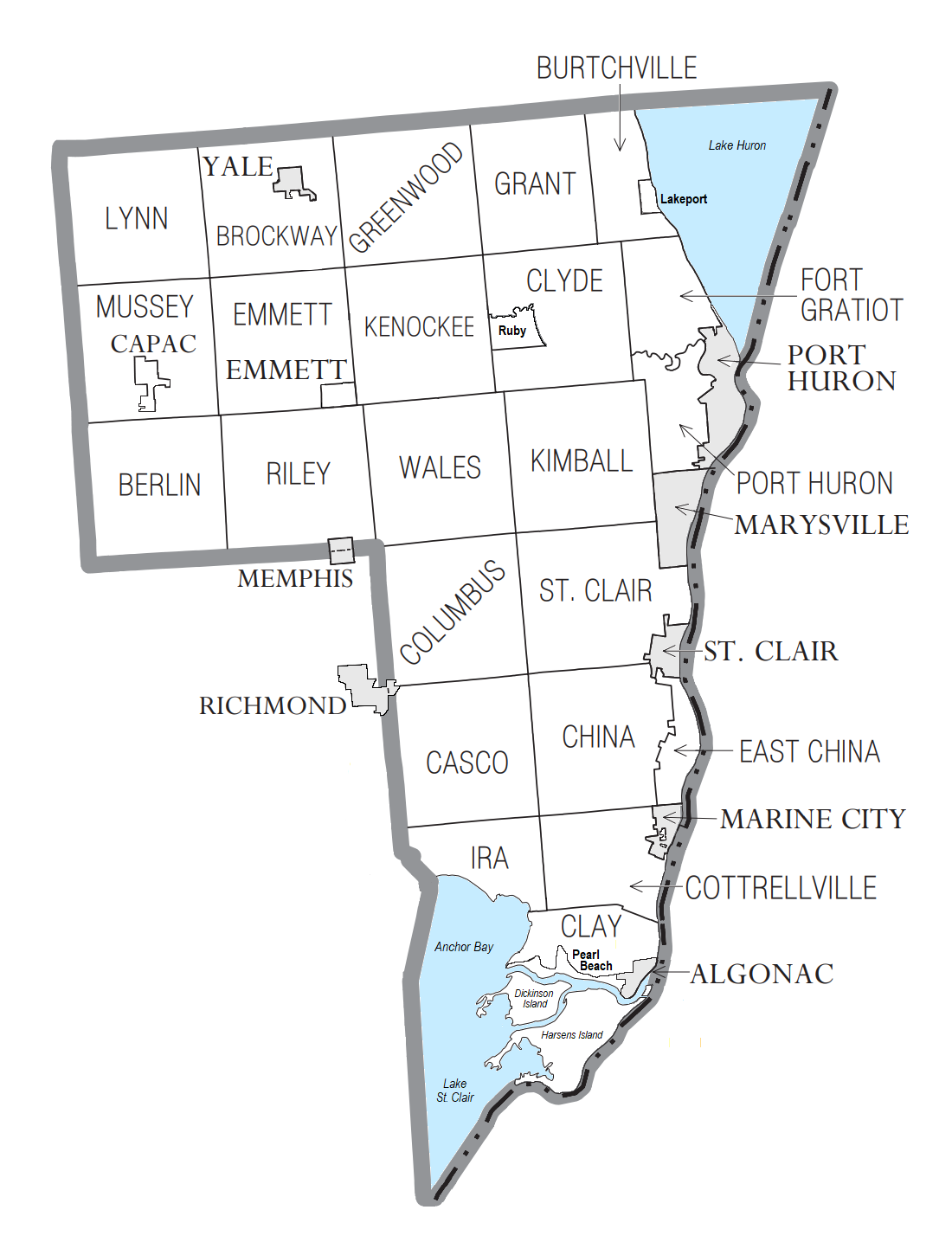
U.S. Census data map showing local municipal boundaries within St. Clair County, as well as CDP boundaries. Shaded areas represent incorporated cities.

=== Cities ===
- Algonac
- Marine City
- Marysville
- Memphis (partial)
- Port Huron (county seat)
- Richmond (partial)
- St. Clair
- Yale

=== Villages ===
- Capac
- Emmett

=== Charter townships ===
- China Charter Township
- East China Charter Township
- Fort Gratiot Charter Township
- Port Huron Charter Township

=== Civil townships ===
- Berlin Township
- Brockway Township
- Burtchville Township
- Casco Township
- Clay Township
- Clyde Township
- Columbus Township
- Cottrellville Township
- Emmett Township
- Grant Township
- Greenwood Township
- Ira Township
- Kenockee Township
- Kimball Township
- Lynn Township
- Mussey Township
- Riley Township
- St. Clair Township
- Wales Township

=== Census-designated places ===
- Lakeport
- Pearl Beach
- Ruby

=== Other unincorporated communities ===
- Abbottsford
- Adair
- Allenton
- Anchorville
- Atkins
- Avoca
- Avalon Beach
- Bedore
- Belle River
- Berville
- Blaine
- Broadbridge Station
- Brockway
- Casco
- Cherry Beach
- Clays Landing
- Columbus
- Copeland Corner
- Fair Haven
- Fargo
- Forster
- Gardendale
- Grande Pointe
- Goodells
- Hawthorne
- Jeddo
- Kimball
- Keewahdin
- Lambs
- Lesterville
- Maple Leaf
- Martindale Beach
- Miller
- Muirs
- Muttonville
- North Lakeport
- North Street
- Perch Point
- Peters
- Pointe aux Tremble
- Rattle Run
- Riley Center
- Riverside
- Roberts Landing
- Sans Souci
- Smiths Creek
- Snyderville
- South Park
- Sparlingville
- Starville
- Tappan
- Thornton
- Wadhams
- Wales
- West Tappan

== See also ==
- List of Michigan State Historic Sites in St. Clair County
- National Register of Historic Places listings in St. Clair County, Michigan
- Blue Water River Walk
