= Emmett Township, St. Clair County, Michigan =

Emmett Township, Michigan
- Civil township
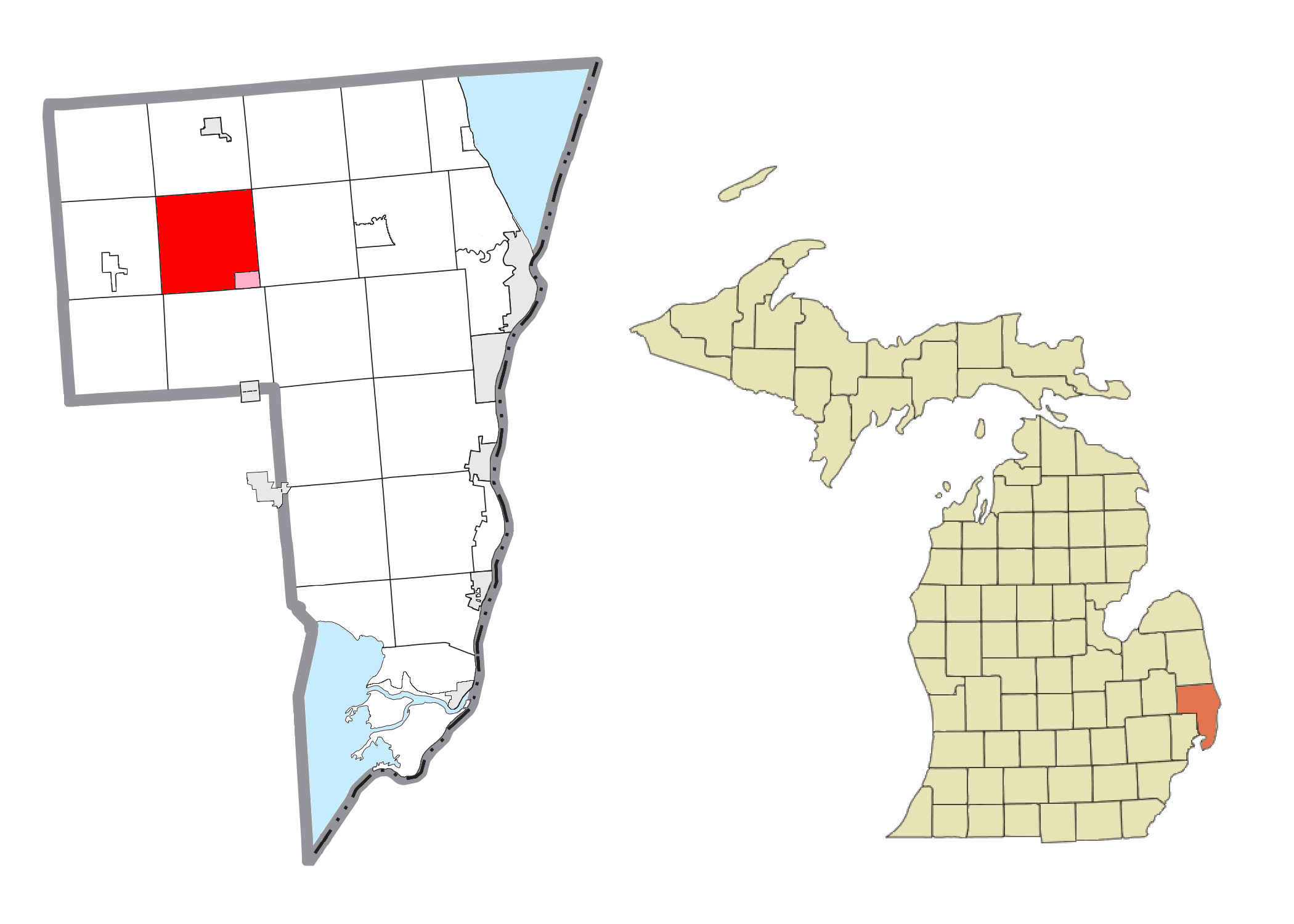
- Location within St. Clair County (red) and the administered village of Emmett (pink)

- Location within the state of Michigan Location within the United States
- Coordinates: 43°00′50″N 82°47′39″W
- Country: United States
- State: Michigan
- County: St. Clair
- Established: 1850

Government
  - Supervisor: Michael Butler
  - Clerk: Stephanie Jackson

Area
  - Total: 35.36 sq mi (91.58 km^{2})
  - Land: 35.34 sq mi (91.53 km^{2})
  - Water: 0.019 sq mi (0.05 km^{2})
- Elevation: 791 ft (241 m)

Population (2020)
  - Total: 2,515
  - Density: 71.2/sq mi (27.5/km^{2})
- Time zone: UTC-5 (Eastern (EST))
  - Summer (DST): UTC-4 (EDT)
- ZIP code(s): 48022 (Emmett)
- Area code: 810
- FIPS code: 26-25960
- GNIS feature ID: 1626240
- Website: Official website

Emmett Township is a civil township of St. Clair County in the U.S. state of Michigan. The population was 2,515 at the 2020 Census. The village of Emmett is located within the township. Emmett Township was set off from Clyde Township in 1850. It is named for Irish patriot Robert Emmet.

== Geography ==
According to the United States Census Bureau, the township has a total area of 35.3 square miles (91 km^{2}), all land.

== Demographics ==
As of the census of 2000, there were 2,506 people, 820 households, and 683 families residing in the township. The population density was 71.0 inhabitants per square mile (27.4/km^{2}). There were 865 housing units at an average density of 24.5 per square mile (9.5/km^{2}). The racial makeup of the township was 98.24% White, 0.24% African American, 0.12% Native American, 0.28% Asian, 0.08% Pacific Islander, 0.64% from other races, and 0.40% from two or more races. Hispanic or Latino of any race were 1.44% of the population.

There were 820 households, out of which 42.9% had children under the age of 18 living with them, 73.9% were married couples living together, 5.7% had a female householder with no husband present, and 16.7% were non-families. 13.2% of all households were made up of individuals, and 3.8% had someone living alone who was 65 years of age or older. The average household size was 3.06 and the average family size was 3.38.

In the township the population was spread out, with 30.6% under the age of 18, 7.6% from 18 to 24, 32.4% from 25 to 44, 21.5% from 45 to 64, and 7.9% who were 65 years of age or older. The median age was 35 years. For every 100 females, there were 103.7 males. For every 100 females age 18 and over, there were 103.4 males.

The median income for a household in the township was $53,452, and the median income for a family was $56,583. Males had a median income of $44,405 versus $28,750 for females. The per capita income for the township was $18,430. About 4.3% of families and 5.8% of the population were below the poverty line, including 6.9% of those under age 18 and 6.5% of those age 65 or over.
