= 2026 Michigan gubernatorial election =

- November 3, 2026
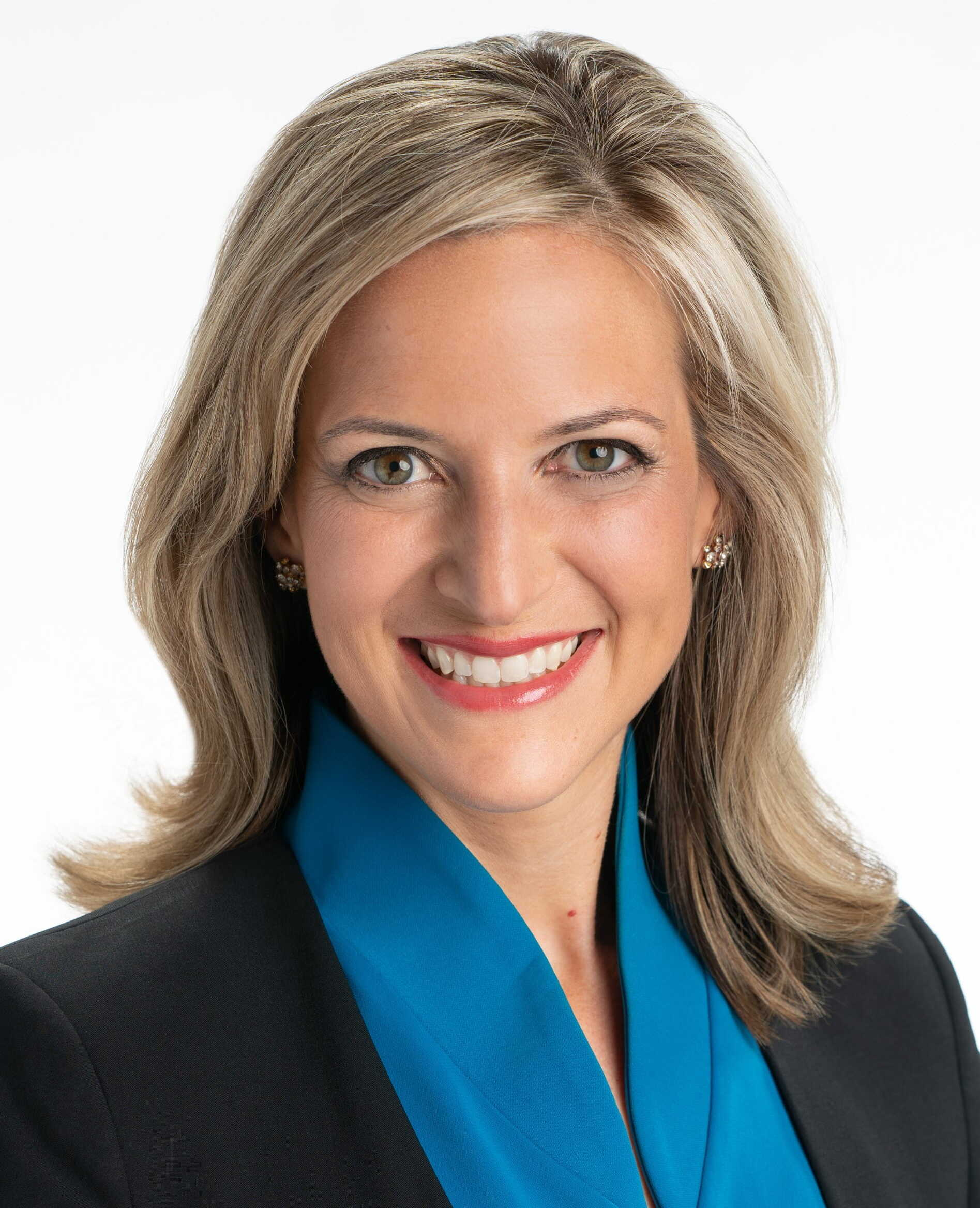

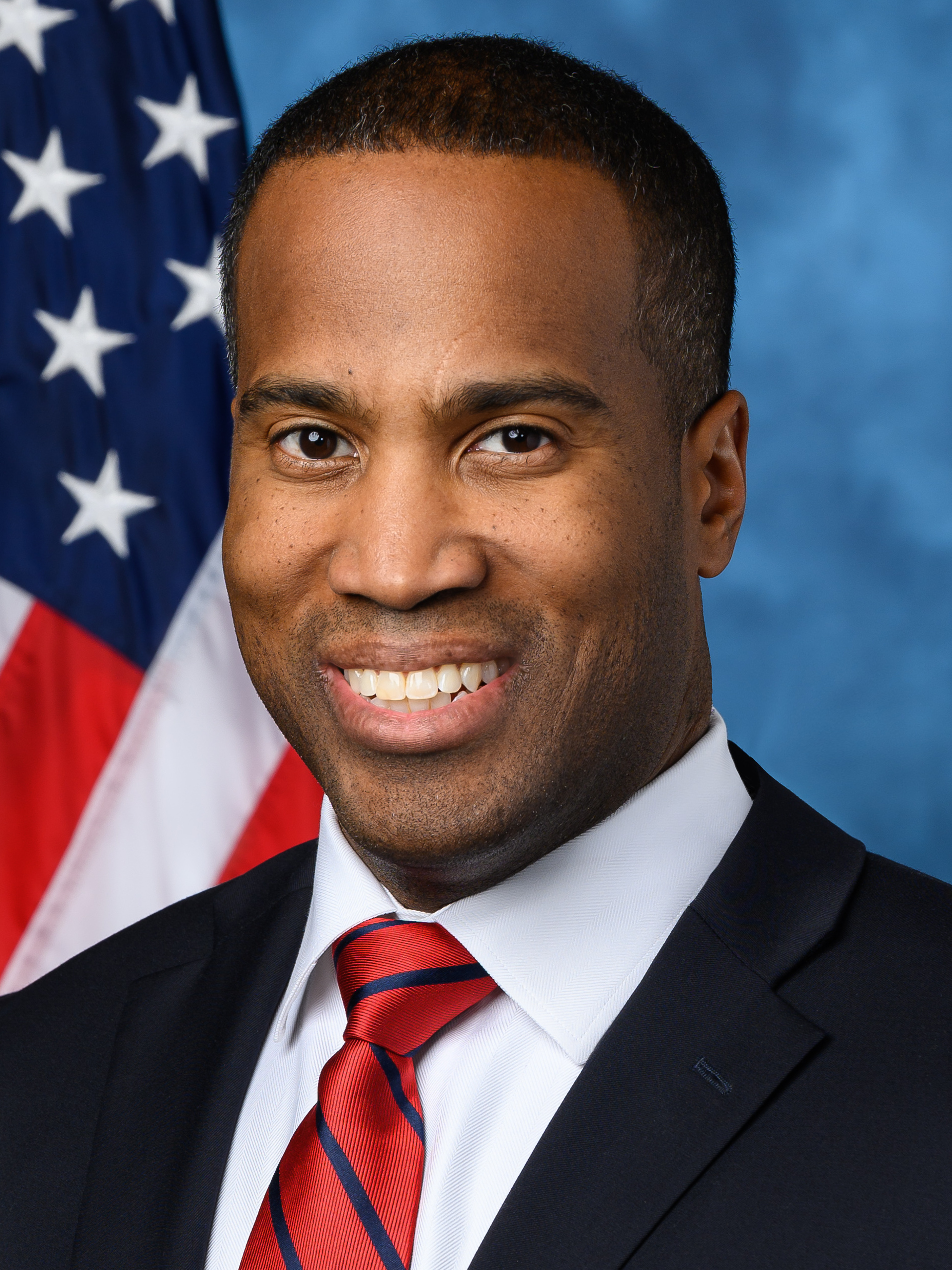
Nominee	Jocelyn Benson	John James
Party	Democratic	Republican
Running mate	Winnie Brinks	Jay DeBoyer
Popular vote	2,615,034	2,094,508
Percentage	54.57%	43.71%
- Benson: 40–50% 50–60% 60–70% 70–80% James: 40–50% 50–60% 60–70% 70–80%
Governor before election
Gretchen Whitmer
Democratic
Elected Governor
Jocelyn Benson
Democratic

The 2026 Michigan gubernatorial election was held on November 3, 2026, to elect the governor of Michigan. Democratic state secretary of state Jocelyn Benson defeated Republican representative John James. Democratic incumbent Gretchen Whitmer was ineligible to seek a third term.

Primary elections were held on August 4. Benson won the Democratic nomination with 83.2% of the vote over Genesee County Sheriff Chris Swanson. Endorsed by President Donald Trump, James won the Republican nomination with 50.1% of the vote over businessman Perry Johnson.

Republicans had not won a gubernatorial election in Michigan since 2014. This was the first gubernatorial election in Michigan since 1960 in which a Democrat who was not the incumbent governor was elected while there was an incumbent Democratic governor. This was also the first time since 1998 that either major party won the Michigan governorship in more than two consecutive elections, and the first time Democrats did so since 1960.

== Background ==
Michigan is a purple state in the heart of the Great Lakes and Rust Belt which consistently elected Democrats for president since 1992 until Republican nominee Donald Trump narrowly flipped the state in 2016. In 2020, Democratic nominee Joe Biden won Michigan by 2.78%. In the 2024 presidential election, Donald Trump won Michigan by 1.42%, which was attributed to President Biden's unpopularity and rightward shifts in working-class and Arab American voters.

Since the 2018 Michigan elections, Democrats occupied all statewide offices in Michigan. Since 2022, Democrats held a narrow majority in the State Senate while Republicans held a narrow majority in the Michigan House of Representatives since 2024. According to the Morning Consult, which measures the popularity of governors across the country, Democratic governor Gretchen Whitmer has a net +26 approval rating in Michigan as of September 2026.

In 2018, Gretchen Whitmer and her running mate Garlin Gilchrist won by 9.56%. In 2022, Whitmer and Gilchrist won by 10.53%.

The deadline for candidates to submit petitions to run for governor in the partisan primaries was Tuesday, April 21, 2026.

== Democratic primary ==
=== Candidates ===
==== Nominee ====
- Jocelyn Benson, Michigan secretary of state (2019–present)
  - Running mate: Winnie Brinks, majority leader of the Michigan Senate (2023–present) from the 29th district (2019–present)

==== Eliminated in primary ====
- Chris Swanson, Genesee County sheriff (2020–present)

==== Disqualified ====
- Kim Thomas, auditor

==== Not on ballot ====
- Kevin Hogan, biochemist and Green nominee for governor in 2022
- Marni Sawicki, former mayor of Cape Coral, Florida (2013–2017)

==== Withdrawn ====
- Garlin Gilchrist, lieutenant governor of Michigan (2019–present), (ran for secretary of state)

==== Declined ====
- Pete Buttigieg, former U.S. secretary of transportation (2021–2025)
- Dan Kildee, former U.S. representative from Michigan's 8th congressional district (2013–2025)
- Mallory McMorrow, state senator from the 8th district (2019–present) (ran for U.S. Senate)
- Gary Peters, U.S. senator (2015–present)

=== Endorsements ===
Jocelyn Benson

Executive branch officials

- Pete Buttigieg, former secretary of transportation (2021–2025)
- Jennifer Granholm, former secretary of energy (2021–2025) and former governor of Michigan (2003–2011)

U.S. representatives

- Brenda Lawrence, former MI-14 (2015–2023)
- Mark Schauer, former MI-7 (2009–2011)
- Hillary Scholten, MI-3 (2023–present)

Statewide officials

- James Blanchard, former governor of Michigan (1983–1991)
- Wes Moore, governor of Maryland (2023–present)

State legislators

- Sarah Anthony, SD-21 (2023–present)
- Winnie Brinks, majority leader of the Michigan Senate (2023–present) from SD-29 (2019–present)
- Darrin Camilleri, SD-4 (2023–present)
- Stephanie Chang, SD-3 (2019–present)
- Jeff Irwin, SD-15 (2019–present)
- Sean McCann, SD-19 (2019–present)
- Jeremy Moss, SD-7 (2019–present)
- Ranjeev Puri, minority leader of the Michigan House of Representatives (2025–present) from HD-24 (2021–present)
- Sam Singh, SD-28 (2023–present)
- Paul Wojno, SD-10 (2019–present) (previously endorsed Gilchrist)
- 24 other state representatives (Note: Joey Andrews, HD-38 (2023–present); Noah Arbit, HD-20 (2023–present); Felicia Brabec, former HD-33 (2021–2024); Kelly Breen, HD-21 (2019–present); Julie Brixie, HD-73 (2019–present); Betsy Coffia, HD-103 (2023–present); Jennifer Conlin, HD-48 (2023–present); Emily Dievendorf, HD-77 (2023–present); Morgan Foreman, HD-33 (2025–present) (previously endorsed Gilchrist); Jason Hoskins, HD-18 (2023–present); Denise Mentzer, HD-61 (2023–present); Jason Morgan, HD-23 (2023–present); Tonya Myers Phillips, HD-7 (2025–present); Veronica Paiz, HD-10 (2023–present); Laurie Pohutsky, HD-17 (2019–present) (previously endorsed Gilchrist); Natalie Price, HD-6 (2023–present); Carrie Rheingans, HD-47 (2023–present); Phil Skaggs, HD-80 (2023–present); Penelope Tsernoglou, HD-75 (2023–present); Dylan Wegela, HD-26 (2023–present); Jimmie Wilson Jr., HD-32 (2023–present); Stephen Wooden, HD-81 (2025–present); Mai Xiong, HD-13 (2024–present) (previously endorsed Gilchrist); Adam Zemke, former HD-55 (2013–2019))

Local officials

- David Coulter, Oakland County executive (2019–present)
- Warren Evans, Wayne County executive (2015–present)
- Abdullah Hammoud, mayor of Dearborn (2022–present)
- David LaGrand, mayor of Grand Rapids (2025–present)
- Greg Mathis, television personality and former district court judge
- Mary Sheffield, mayor of Detroit (2026–present)
- Christopher Taylor, mayor of Ann Arbor (2014–present)
- Kym Worthy, Wayne County Prosecuting Attorney (2004–present)

Individuals

- Hill Harper, actor
- Horace Sheffield III, pastor and talk show host
- George Takei, actor

Party chapters

- 13th Congressional District Democratic Party

Labor unions

- American Federation of Teachers Michigan
- Association of Flight Attendants-CWA
- International Alliance of Theatrical Stage Employees Local 26
- Laborers' International Union of North America Michigan District Council and Locals 355 and 499
- Michigan AFL-CIO
- Michigan Nurses Association
- Michigan Professional Fire Fighters
- Northern Midwest Regional Council of Carpenters
- SEIU Michigan
- Teamsters Locals 243, 247, 283, 406, and 1038
- United Association Local 174
- United Auto Workers
- United Food and Commercial Workers Local 876 and 951

Organizations

- Emgage Action
- EMILY's List
- End Citizens United
- Giffords
- Jewish Democratic Council of America
- Michigan Association for Justice
- Michigan League of Conservation Voters
- Reproductive Freedom for All
- Vote Mama
- Young Democrats of Michigan

Newspapers

- Michigan Chronicle
Chris Swanson

Statewide officials

- John Cherry, former lieutenant governor of Michigan (2003–2011)

Local officials

- Virgil Bernero, former mayor of Lansing (2006–2018)

Individuals

- Sean O'Brien, general president of the Teamsters (2022–present)

Labor unions

- American Federation of State, County and Municipal Employees Local 875
- Bricklayers and Allied Craftworkers Local 2
- International Association of Bridge, Structural, Ornamental and Reinforcing Iron Workers Local 25
- International Brotherhood of Boilermakers
- International Brotherhood of Electrical Workers Michigan and Local 948
- International Union of Operating Engineers Local 324
- Iron Workers Local 25
- Michigan Building and Construction Trades Council of Northern Michigan and statewide
- Michigan Pipe Trades Association
- Sheet Metal Workers' Local 7
- SMART Local 7
- Teamsters and Locals 214, 299, 332, and 614
- United Association Locals 85 and 370
- United Union of Roofers, Waterproofers and Allied Workers Local 149

Organizations

- Southeast Michigan Chamber of Commerce (previously endorsed Duggan)

Newspapers

- The Detroit News (Democratic primary only)
Garlin Gilchrist (withdrawn)

U.S. representatives

- Jasmine Crockett, TX-7 (2023–present)
- Pramila Jayapal, WA-7 (2017–present)
- Ilhan Omar, MN-5 (2019–present)
- Rashida Tlaib, MI-12 (2019–present)

State legislators

- Brenda Carter, HD-53 (2019–present)
- Kimberly Edwards, HD-12 (2023–present)
- ~~Morgan Foreman, HD-33 (2025–present)~~ (endorsed Benson after withdrawal)
- Peter Herzberg, HD-25 (2024–present)
- Veronica Klinefelt, SD-11 (2023–present)
- Donavan McKinney, HD-11 (2023–present)
- Cynthia Neeley, HD-70 (2020–present)
- Amos O'Neal, HD-94 (2021–present)
- ~~Laurie Pohutsky, HD-17 (2019–present)~~ (endorsed Benson after withdrawal)
- ~~Paul Wojno, SD-10 (2019–present)~~ (endorsed Benson after withdrawal)
- ~~Mai Xiong, HD-13 (2024–present)~~ (endorsed Benson after withdrawal)
Declined to endorse

U.S. senators

- Elissa Slotkin, Michigan (2025–present)

Statewide officials

- Gretchen Whitmer, incumbent governor (2019–present)

Labor unions

- Michigan Education Association

=== Debates and forums ===
2026 Michigan Democratic gubernatorial primary debates and forums
No.	Date	Host	Moderator	Link	Democratic	Democratic
Key: P Participant A Absent N Not invited I Invited W Withdrawn						
Key: P Participant A Absent N Not invited I Invited W Withdrawn					Benson	Swanson
1	June 4, 2026	Fox 2 Detroit	Roop Raj	YouTube	A	P

=== Fundraising ===
Italics indicate a withdrawn or disqualified candidate.

Campaign finance reports as of July 19, 2026
Candidate	Raised	Spent	Cash on hand
Jocelyn Benson (D)	$10,716,576	$4,311,982	$6,404,593
Garlin Gilchrist (D)	$1,316,061	$1,302,624	$13,436
Marni Sawicki (D)	$15,930 (Note: $13,300 of this total has been self-funded by Sawicki)	$14,605	$1,325
Chris Swanson (D)	$2,171,061	$1,984,058	$187,003
Kim Thomas (D)	$0	$22,005	$0
Source: Michigan Secretary of State

=== Polling ===
Poll source	Date(s) administered	Sample size (Note: Key: A – all adults RV – registered voters LV – likely voters V – unclear)	Margin of error	Jocelyn Benson	Garlin Gilchrist	Chris Swanson	Other	Undecided
Glengariff Group (Note: Poll commissioned by WDIV-TV and The Detroit News.)	July 8–11, 2026	500 (LV)	± 4.4%	72%	–	12%	–	16%
Mitchell Research	May 1–7, 2026	405 (LV)	± 4.9%	62%	–	8%	–	30%
Glengariff Group (Note: Poll sponsored by The Detroit Regional Chamber, which endorsed Duggan in July 2025)	April 17–19, 2026	500 (LV)	± 4.4%	66%	–	8%	3% (Note: Mike Duggan, Abdul El-Sayed, and Garlin Gilchrist with a combined 3%)	23%
Emerson College	April 11–13, 2026	519 (LV)	± 4.3%	52%	–	5%	8% (Note: Kim Thomas with 5%; Kevin Hogan with 2%; Marni Sawicki with 1%)	36%
	January 12, 2026	Gilchrist withdraws from the race to run for Michigan Secretary of State						
Mitchell Research	November 18–21, 2025	261 (LV)	± 6.1%	48%	12%	5%	–	35%
Rosetta Stone Communications (R)	October 23–25, 2025	287 (LV)	± 5.8%	58%	15%	6%	–	21%
Impact Research (D) (Note: Poll sponsored by Benson's campaign)	September 30 – October 6, 2025	453 (LV)	± 4.6%	56%	17%	5%	–	22%
Glengariff Group	May 5−8, 2025	600 (RV)	± 4.0%	59%	7%	8%	–	26%
Glengariff Group	May 5−8, 2025	600 (RV)	± 4.0%	65% (Note: Among "definite voters")	10%	5%	–	20%
Mitchell Research (Note: Poll commissioned by MIRS, a nonpartisan tipsheet)	March 13, 2025	303 (LV)	± 5.6%	46%	13%	11%	–	30%

Hypothetical polling

Poll source	Date(s) administered	Sample size	Margin of error	Jocelyn Benson	Garlin Gilchrist	Dana Nessel	Chris Swanson	Undecided
Target Insyght	March 3–6, 2025	344 (V)	± 5.7%	55%	12%	12%	3%	19%

=== Results ===
Primary results by county: Benson: 50–60%; 60–70%; 70–80%; 80–90%; >90%

Democratic primary results
Party	Candidate	Votes	%
Democratic	Jocelyn Benson	1,251,160	83.22
Democratic	Chris Swanson	252,236	16.78
Write-in		10	0.0
Total votes		1,503,406	100.0

== Republican primary ==
=== Candidates ===
==== Nominee ====
- John James, U.S. representative from Michigan's 10th congressional district (2023–present) and nominee for U.S. Senate in 2018 and 2020
  - Running mate: Jay DeBoyer, state representative from the 63rd district (2023–present)

==== Eliminated in primary ====
- Perry Johnson, businessman, disqualified candidate for governor in 2022, and candidate for president in 2024

==== Disqualified ====
- Ralph Rebandt, pastor and candidate for governor in 2022 (endorsed Johnson)

==== Not on ballot ====
- Joyce Gipson, advocate
- William Null, construction manager
- Evan Space, entrepreneur and former member of the National Guard

==== Withdrawn ====
- Mike Cox, former Michigan attorney general (2003–2011) and candidate for governor in 2010 (remained on ballot; endorsed James)
- Anthony Hudson, truck driver and candidate for Michigan's 8th congressional district in 2024 (switched to Libertarian convention)
- Tom Leonard, former speaker of the Michigan House of Representatives (2017–2019) from the 93rd district (2013–2019), nominee for attorney general in 2018 and candidate in 2022 (endorsed James)
- Aric Nesbitt, minority leader of the Michigan Senate (2023–present) from the 20th district (2019–present) (remained on ballot; endorsed James)
- Karla Wagner, political organizer (ran as an Independent; withdrew again)

==== Declined ====
- Tudor Dixon, conservative media personality and nominee for governor in 2022
- Kevin Rinke, former car dealer and candidate for governor in 2022 (endorsed Johnson)

=== Endorsements ===
John James

Executive branch officials

- Donald Trump, president of the United States (2017–2021, 2025–present)

U.S. representatives

- Jack Bergman, MI-01 (2017–present)
- Lisa McClain, MI-09 (2021–present) and chair of the House Republican Conference (2025–present)

Statewide officials

- Mike Cox, former Michigan attorney general (2003–2011)

State legislators

- Jon Bumstead, SD-32 (2019–present)
- Jay DeBoyer, HD-63 (2023–present)
- Parker Fairbairn, HD-107 (2025–present)
- Matt Hall, speaker of the Michigan House of Representatives (2025–present) from HD-42 (2019–present)
- Roger Hauck, SD-34 (2023–present)
- Tom Leonard, former speaker of the Michigan House of Representatives (2017–2019) from HD-93 (2013–2019)
- Peter Lucido, Macomb County prosecutor (2021–present) and former SD-8 (2019–2020)
- Aric Nesbitt, minority leader of the Michigan Senate (2023–present) from SD-20 (2019–present)
- Alicia St. Germaine, HD-62 (2023–present)
- Michael Webber, SD-9 (2023–present)

Local officials

- Mike Murphy, Livingston County sheriff (2017–present)

Individuals

- Ted Nugent, singer and songwriter
- Kid Rock, rapper

Organizations

- Americans for Prosperity Michigan
- Right to Life of Michigan

Newspapers

- Detroit Free Press
Perry Johnson

Statewide officials

- Nikki Snyder, member of the Michigan State Board of Education (2017–present)

State legislators

- David Agema, HD-74 (2007–2012)
- Steve Carra, HD-36 (2021–present)
- Matt Maddock, HD-51 (2023–present)

Party officials

- Meshawn Maddock, co-chair of the Michigan Republican Party (2021–2023)
Mike Cox (withdrawn, remained on ballot)

Organizations

- Michigan College Republicans
Tom Leonard (withdrawn)

Statewide officials

- Tom McMillin, member of the Michigan State Board of Education (2017–present)

=== Debates and forums ===
2026 Michigan Republican gubernatorial primary debates and forums
No.	Date	Host	Moderator	Link	Republican	Republican	Republican
Key: P Participant A Absent N Not invited I Invited W Withdrawn							
Key: P Participant A Absent N Not invited I Invited W Withdrawn					Cox	James	Johnson
1	July 8, 2026	Fox 2 Detroit	Roop Raj	YouTube	P	P	P
2	July 9, 2026	WOOD-TV	Rick Albin	YouTube	P	P	P

=== Fundraising ===
Italics indicate a withdrawn or disqualified candidate.

Campaign finance reports as of July 19, 2026
Candidate	Raised	Spent	Cash on hand
Mike Cox (R)	$7,641,829 (Note: $3.5 million of this total has been self-funded by Cox)	$6,778,906	$862,922
Anthony Hudson (R)	$13,682	$12,480	$1,202
John James (R)	$5,507,746	$4,165,126	$1,342,619
Perry Johnson (R)	$30,808,204 (Note: $30.75 million of this total has been self-funded by Johnson)	$29,598,184	$1,188,625
Tom Leonard (R)	$1,076,397 (Note: $105,000 of this total has been self-funded by Leonard)	$983,805	$92,592
Aric Nesbitt (R)	$3,629,701	$3,392,477	$237,224
Ralph Rebandt (R)	$1,011,082 (Note: $848,340 of this total has been self-funded by Rebandt)	$985,799	$25,283
Karla Wagner (R)	$4,092	$2,671	$1,421
Source: Michigan Secretary of State

=== Polling ===
Aggregate polls

Source of poll aggregation	Dates administered	Dates updated	Mike Cox	John James	Perry Johnson	Undecided (Note: Calculated by taking the difference of 100% and all other candidates combined.)	Margin
270toWin	July 30 – August 1, 2026	August 3, 2026	11.0%	45.0%	27.0%	17.0% (Note: Aric Nesbitt with 4.0%)	James +18.0%

Poll source	Date(s) administered	Sample size	Margin of error	Mike Cox	John James	Perry Johnson	Tom Leonard	Aric Nesbitt	Other	Undecided
Mitchell Research	July 28–29, 2026	332 (LV)	± 5.34%	13%	50%	22%	–	5%	–	10%
Emerson College (Note: Poll sponsored by WLNS 6 News and WOOD-TV)	July 26–27, 2026	350 (LV)	± 5.2%	13% (Note: With voters who lean towards a given candidate)	48%	33%	–	6%	–	–
Emerson College	July 26–27, 2026	350 (LV)	± 5.2%	9%	40%	32%	–	3%	–	17%
	July 17, 2026	Cox withdraws from the race, endorses James								
co/efficient (R) (Note: Poll sponsored by Cox's campaign)	July 14–16, 2026	773 (LV)	± 3.5%	21%	36%	23%	–	3%	–	17%
co/efficient (R)	June 30 – July 3, 2026	1,101 (LV)	± 2.9%	20%	35%	23%	–	4%	–	18%
OnMessage Inc. (R) (Note: Poll sponsored by James' campaign)	June 28–30, 2026	800 (LV)	–	14%	46%	21%	–	–	–	19%
	June 22, 2026	Nesbitt withdraws from the race, endorses James								
Strategic National (R) (Note: Poll sponsored by Johnson's campaign)	June 10–14, 2026	500 (LV)	± 4.4%	12%	24%	27%	–	6%	–	31%
Susquehanna Polling & Research	June 9–14, 2026	175 (LV)	± 7.4%	20%	38%	10%	–	3%	5% (Note: Anthony Hudson with 5%; Ralph Rebandt with 0%)	24%
Mitchell Research	June 11–13, 2026	404 (LV)	± 4.9%	27%	28%	23%	–	4%	–	18%
Tarrance Group (R)	June 1–4, 2026	500 (LV)	± 4.4%	22%	38%	26%	–	12%	–	2%
TIPP Insights (R) (Note: Poll sponsored by the League of American Workers, a conservative advocacy group founded by Steve Cortes, former senior advisor to President Donald Trump.)	May 20–23, 2026	555 (LV)	–	20%	31%	19%	–	3%	5% (Note: Joyce Gipson with 3%; Ralph Rebandt & Evan Space with 1%)	21%
1892 Polling (R)	May 12–14, 2026	681 (LV)	± 3.8%	7%	24%	23%	–	7%	–	39%
Mitchell Research	May 1–7, 2026	400 (LV)	± 4.9%	19%	32%	23%	–	7%	2% (Note: Anthony Hudson with 2%; Ralph Rebandt with 0%)	17%
Glengariff Group	April 21–24, 2026	500 (LV)	–	10%	37%	20%	3%	7%	6% (Note: Ralph Rebandt with 1%; "Someone else" with 5%)	20%
	April 23, 2026	Leonard withdraws from the race								
OnMessage Inc. (R)	April 15–18, 2026	400 (LV)	–	7%	41%	18%	–	5%	–	–
Emerson College	April 11–13, 2026	452 (LV)	± 4.6%	10%	20%	21%	4%	3%	3% (Note: Joyce Gipson, Ralph Rebandt, and Evan Space with 1%; Karla Wangner with 0%)	39%
1892 Polling (R)	March 25–26, 2026	600 (LV)	± 4.0%	6%	26%	21%	1%	4%	1% (Note: Ralph Rebandt with 1%)	42%
JMC Analytics	March 21–23, 2026	450 (LV)	± 4.6%	6%	23%	20%	3%	5%	–	43%
OnMessage Inc. (R)	March 16–19, 2026	509 (LV)	± 4.3%	10%	37%	19%	1%	4%	–	30%
1892 Polling (R)	February 2026	– (V)	–	5%	44%	4%	2%	4%	0% (Note: Ralph Rebandt with 0%)	35%
	January 26, 2026	Johnson enters the race								
Mitchell Research	November 18–21, 2025	255 (LV)	± 6.1%	11%	48%	–	5%	2%	1%	33%
Rosetta Stone Communications (R)	October 23–25, 2025	252 (LV)	± 6.2%	13%	44%	4%	3%	6%	5% (Note: Kevin Rinke with 4%; Ralph Rebandt with 1%)	25%
Plymouth Union Public (R)	October 8−9, 2025	200 (LV)	± 4.0%	7%	41%	–	<5%	<5%	–	–
Target Insyght	March 3–6, 2025	336 (V)	± 5.7%	5%	57%	1%	–	13%	–	23%
National Research (R) (Note: Poll sponsored by GOPAC, which supports Nesbitt)	February 17–19, 2025	600 (LV)	± 4.0%	10%	38%	–	–	17%	8%	27%
OnMessage Inc.(R) (Note: Poll sponsored by Harbor Strategic Public Affairs)	January 17–19, 2025	1,000 (LV)	± 3.1%	4%	46%	–	1%	6%	9% (Note: Kevin Rinke with 3%; "Other" with 6%)	35%

Hypothetical polling

Poll source	Date(s) administered	Sample size	Margin of error	Mike Cox	Tudor Dixon	John James	Perry Johnson	Tom Leonard	Aric Nesbitt	Undecided
Rosetta Stone Communications (R)	October 23–25, 2025	252 (LV)	± 6.2%	10%	33%	25%	–	–	–	–
Glengariff Group	May 5−8, 2025	600 (RV)	± 4.0%	11%	20%	42%	–	–	5%	22%
Glengariff Group	May 5−8, 2025	600 (RV)	± 4.0%	10%	24%	44%	–	–	4%	18%
Mitchell Research	March 13, 2025	281 (LV)	± 5.8%	10%	30%	31%	8%	1%	5%	15%

=== Results ===
Primary results by county: James: 40–50%; 50–60%; Johnson: 40–50%

Republican primary results
Party	Candidate	Votes	%
Republican	John James	466,714	50.05
Republican	Perry Johnson	328,194	35.20
Republican	Mike Cox (withdrawn)	121,261	13.00
Republican	Aric Nesbitt (withdrawn)	16,295	1.75
Total votes		932,464	100.0

== Libertarian convention ==
=== Candidates ===
==== Nominee ====
- Anthony Hudson, truck driver and Republican candidate for Michigan's 8th congressional district in 2024 (switched from Republican primary)
  - Running mate: Beau Parmenter, businessman

=== Fundraising ===
Campaign finance reports as of December 31, 2025
Candidate	Raised	Spent	Cash on hand
Anthony Hudson (L)	$25,183	$21,245	$3,937
Source: Michigan Secretary of State

== Green convention ==
=== Candidates ===
==== Nominee ====
- Douglas Campbell, engineer and perennial candidate
  - Running mate: Bobbie Clay

== U.S. Taxpayers convention ==
=== Candidates ===
==== Nominee ====
- Donna Brandenburg, businesswoman and U.S. Taxpayers Party nominee for governor in 2022
  - Running mate: Robert Donald Cowper II

== Independents ==
=== Candidates ===
==== Withdrawn ====
- Mike Duggan, former mayor of Detroit (2014–2026)
- Karla Wagner, political organizer (previously ran as a Republican)

=== Fundraising ===
Italics indicate a withdrawn candidate.

Campaign finance reports as of July 20, 2026
Candidate	Raised	Spent	Cash on hand
Mike Duggan (I)	$5,073,806	$4,993,698	$80,108
Karla Wagner (I)	$4,092	$2,671	$1,421
Source: Michigan Secretary of State

== General election ==
=== Campaign ===
In September 2026, the Libertarian Party of Michigan formally disavowed connections and support to Anthony Hudson, their gubernatorial nominee. The party stated that Hudson's campaign was promoting positions that contradicted their purpose as a party, while Hudson responded and said that he was comfortable with their disavowal. Given that this happened after the withdrawal deadline had passed, Hudson's name still appeared listed as the party's nominee on the election ballot. Also in September 2026, it was revealed that Hudson's running mate, Beau Parmenter, had been arrested that month and charged with felony larceny by conversion for an incident from May 2025.

=== Predictions ===
Source	Ranking	As of
The Cook Political Report	Lean D	October 29, 2026
Decision Desk HQ	Likely D	November 3, 2026
Fox News	Lean D	November 1, 2026
Inside Elections	Lean D	October 29, 2026
NBC News	Lean D	November 3, 2026
RealClearPolitics	Lean D	November 1, 2026
Sabato's Crystal Ball	Likely D	November 2, 2026
Silver Bulletin	Solid D	November 3, 2026

=== Post-primary endorsements ===
Jocelyn Benson (D)

Executive branch officials

- Barack Obama, former president of the United States (2009–2017)

Statewide officials

- Gretchen Whitmer, governor of Michigan (2019–present)

Labor unions

- Michigan Education Association

Organizations

- Brady PAC
- Everytown for Gun Safety
- Human Rights Campaign PAC

Newspapers

- Detroit Free Press
John James (R)

Local officials

- William Federspiel, Saginaw County sheriff (2009–present) (elected as a Democrat)

Individuals

- Nicki Minaj, Trinidadian rapper

Organizations

- Michigan Chamber of Commerce
- Michigan Farm Bureau
Mike Duggan (I) (withdrawn)

Executive branch officials

- Sandy Baruah, former administrator of the Small Business Administration (2008–2009) (Republican)

U.S. representatives

- Dave Trott, former MI-11 (2015–2019) (Independent; elected as a Republican)

Statewide officials

- Mark Bernstein, regent of the University of Michigan (2013–present) (Democratic)
- Marshall Bullock, member of the Michigan State Board of Education (2023–present) (Democratic)
- Denise Ilitch, regent of the University of Michigan (2009–present) (Democratic)
- Conrad Mallett Jr., former chief justice (1997–1998) of the Michigan Supreme Court (1990–1999) (Democratic)

State legislators

- 14 state representatives (Note: Brian Banks, former HD-1 (2013–2017) and convicted felon (Democratic); Wendell Byrd, former HD-3 (2015–2021) (Democratic); Phil Cavanagh, former HD-10 (2011–2014) (Democratic); John Chirkun, former HD-22 (2015–2021) (Democratic); Edward Gaffney, former HD-1 (2003–2008) (Republican); Kurt Heise, former HD-20 (2011–2016) (Republican); James Kosteva, former HD-37 (1985–1992) (Democratic); Phil LaJoy, former HD-21 (2003–2008) (Republican); Keith Stallworth, former HD-12 (1997–2002) (Democratic); Thomas Stallworth III, former HD-7 (2011–2015) (Democratic); Richard Steenland, former HD-22 (2021–2023) (Democratic); Buzz Thomas, former HD-4 (1997–2011) (Democratic); Karen Whitsett, HD-4 (2019–present) (Democratic); Gary Woronchak, former HD-15 (1999–2004) (Note: Woronchak held this seat as a Republican, and was then elected to the Wayne County Commission's 13th district (2005–2018) as a Democrat.) (Democratic))

Local officials

- Laura Toy, at-large Livonia city councilor (1988–1995, 2008–2015, 2018–present) and former state senator from the 6th district (2003–2006) (Republican)
- Mary Waters, at-large Detroit city councilor (2022–present) (Democratic)
- Karen Weaver, former mayor of Flint (2015–2019) (Democratic)

Individuals

- William Clay Ford Jr., executive chair of Ford Motor Company (1999–present)
- Andrew Yang, businessman and 2020 Democratic presidential candidate (Forward)

Labor unions

- Amalgamated Transit Union Locals 26 and 1564
- American Postal Workers Union Local 480-481
- Detroit Police Officers Association and Detroit Police Lieutenants and Sergeants Association
- International Association of Fire Fighters Local 344
- International Alliance of Theatrical Stage Employees Local 38
- International Brotherhood of Electrical Workers Local 58
- International Brotherhood of Teamsters Joint Council 43 (Note: While both Joint Council 43 and its president Kevin Moore had endorsed Duggan, it was not "on behalf of their 10 affiliated local unions." Of the 10 statewide locals, a majority consisting of 5 locals endorsed Benson, whereas two additional locals, Locals 332 and 614, endorsed Swanson instead.)
- International Union of Bricklayers and Allied Craftworkers Local 2
- International Union of Painters and Allied Trades Council 1M
- Michigan Professional Fire Fighters Union
- Michigan Regional State Council of Carpenters and Millwrights
- UNITE HERE Local 24
- United Association Locals 98, 636, and 704
- United Union of Roofers, Waterproofers, and Allied Workers Local 149

Organizations

- Detroit NAACP
- Detroit Regional Chamber of Commerce
- Emgage Action
- ~~Southeast Michigan Chamber of Commerce~~ (endorsed Swanson after withdrawal)

Political parties

- Reform Party of the United States of America
Declined to endorse

Organizations

- Detroit Regional Chamber PAC

=== Debate ===
2026 Michigan gubernatorial election debates and forums
No.	Date	Host	Moderator	Link	Democratic	Republican
Key: P Participant A Absent N Not invited I Invited W Withdrawn						
Key: P Participant A Absent N Not invited I Invited W Withdrawn					Benson	James
1	October 6, 2026	WOOD-TV	Rick Albin; Amber Krycka	YouTube	P	P
2	October 15, 2026	WDIV-TV	Jason Colthorp	YouTube	P	P

=== Fundraising ===
Campaign finance reports as of October 18, 2026
Candidate	Raised	Spent	Cash on hand
Jocelyn Benson (D)	$16,658,392	$15,977,676	$680,716
John James (R)	$12,402,854	$8,565,219	$1,216,757
Anthony Hudson (L)	$95,131	$66,891	$28,211
Source: Michigan Secretary of State

=== Polling ===
Aggregate polls

Source of poll aggregation	Dates administered	Dates updated	Jocelyn Benson (D)	John James (R)	Other/ Undecided (Note: Calculated by taking the difference of 100% and all other candidates combined.)	Margin
270toWin	October 8 – November 1, 2026	November 2, 2026	52.4%	42.7%	4.9%	Benson +9.7%
Decision Desk HQ	through November 1, 2026	November 2, 2026	51.4%	42.5%	6.1%	Benson +8.9%
FiftyPlusOne	through November 1, 2026	November 2, 2026	51.6%	42.2%	6.2%	Benson +9.4%
RealClearPolitics	October 2 – November 1, 2026	November 1, 2026	51.4%	42.6%	6.0%	Benson +8.8%
Silver Bulletin	through November 1, 2026	November 2, 2026	51.8%	42.4%	5.8%	Benson +9.4%
Average			51.7%	42.5%	5.8%	Benson +9.2%

Poll source	Date(s) administered	Sample size	Margin of error	Jocelyn Benson (D)	John James (R)	Other	Undecided
Emerson College (Note: Poll sponsored by Poll Vault, a Substack newsletter authored by Sean Trende.)	October 31 – November 1, 2026	500 (LV)	—	50%	46%	4% (Note: Donna Brandenburg (UST) & Anthony Hudson (L) with 2%; Douglas Campbell (G) with 0%)	—
Concord Public Opinion Partners (D)	October 31 – November 1, 2026	510 (LV)	± 4.3%	50%	41%	4% (Note: "Someone else" with 4%)	4%
HarrisX	October 30 – November 1, 2026	663 (LV)	± 3.8%	53%	41%	3% (Note: "Another candidate" with 3%)	3%
Research Co.	October 30 – November 1, 2026	450 (LV)	± 4.6%	53%	41%	1% (Note: "Some other candidate" with 1%)	5%
AtlasIntel	October 28 – November 1, 2026	1,316 (LV)	± 3.0%	53%	45%	0% (Note: "Other" and "Would not vote" with <1%)	1%
New York Times/Siena University	October 23 – November 1, 2026	1,011 (LV)	± 3.8%	52%	39%	<1% (Note: "Another candidate" with <1%)	8%
YouGov	October 26–29, 2026	2,093 (LV)	± 3.0%	52%	46%	1%	0%
Rasmussen Reports (R)	October 28–29, 2026	745 (LV)	± 3.0%	50%	40%	3% (Note: Anthony Hudson (L) with 1%; Donna Brandenburg (UST) with 1%; Douglas Campbell (G) with 1%)	7%
Mitchell Research & Communications (Note: Poll conducted for CBS Detroit.)	October 26–27, 2026	636 (LV)	± 3.9%	49%	44%	3%	4%
SSRS (Note: Poll conducted for CNN)	October 20–27, 2026	768 (LV)	± 4.7%	53%	41%	5% (Note: "Neither" with 3%)	1%
Data for Progress (D)	October 23–25, 2026	622 (LV)	± 4.0%	50%	46%	2% (Note: Lydia Christensen (L) with 1%; Tim Long (UST) with 1%; Douglas Marsh (G) with 0%; Walter Kristy (NL) with 0%)	3%
Michigan State University/Verasight	October 8–23, 2026	1,383 (LV)	± 3.1%	51%	42%	8%	—
Michigan State University/Verasight	October 8–23, 2026	1,383 (LV)	± 3.1%	49%	39%	3%	10%
Glengariff Group (Note: Poll conducted for The Detroit News and WDIV-TV)	October 19–22, 2026	600 (LV)	± 4.0%	51%	45%	—	4%
Michigan State University/YouGov	October 2–19, 2026	836 (LV)	± 4.4%	52%	40%	9%	
Michigan State University/YouGov	October 2–19, 2026	836 (LV)	± 4.4%	53%	41%	6%	
Michigan State University/YouGov	October 2–19, 2026	1,000 (A)	± 4.1%	44%	35%	21%	
Michigan State University/YouGov	October 2–19, 2026	1,000 (A)	± 4.1%	46%	37%	18%	
Marist University	October 15–18, 2026	— (LV)	± 4.3%	51%	45%	2%	1%
Marist University	October 15–18, 2026	1,185 (RV)	± 4.0%	53%	42%	2%	2%
YouGov	September 22 – October 4, 2026	3,949 (LV)	± 2.5%	48%	45%	1%	6%
Mitchell Research & Communications	October 1, 2026	682 (LV)	± 3.8%	46%	39%	6% (Note: Hudson (L) with 2%; Campbell (G) with 2%; Brandenburg (UST) with 2%)	9%
Z to A Research (D) (Note: Poll sponsored by Rust Belt Rising, which supports Democrats)	September 28 – October 1, 2026	483 (LV)	—	50%	40%	5% (Note: Anthony Hudson (L) with 4%; Douglas Campbell (G) with 1%)	2%
Beacon Research (D)/ Shaw & Co. Research (R) (Note: Poll conducted for Fox News)	September 24–28, 2026	1,203 (RV)	± 3.0%	54%	45%	—	1%
Marist University	September 24–27, 2026	1,235 (RV)	± 3.8%	53%	41%	3%	3%
Guidant Polling & Strategy (Note: Poll sponsored by Public First Action)	September 20–27, 2026	800 (LV)	± 3.5%	50%	45%	—	5%
co/efficient (R)	September 21–23, 2026	843 (LV)	± 3.36%	47%	44%	—	8%
New York Times/Siena University	September 15–22, 2026	605 (LV)	± 4.9%	48%	43%	—	9%
Beacon Research (D)/ Cygnal (R) (Note: Poll sponsored by Michigan Enjoyer)	September 18–21, 2026	600 (LV)	± 4.0%	45%	38%	4% (Note: Hudson (L) with 3%; Campbell (G) with 1%; Brandenburg (UST) with <1%)	11%
Suffolk University	September 16–20, 2026	500 (LV)	± 4.4%	51%	34%	4% (Note: Campbell (G) with 2%; Hudson (L) with 1%; Brandenburg (UST) with 0%; Write-in with 1%)	8%
Torchlight Strategies (R) (Note: Poll sponsored by Common Sense for America PAC, which supports Republicans)	September 15–19, 2026	643 (LV)	± 4.7%	42%	41%	4%	13%
Emerson College	September 12–14, 2026	1,000 (LV)	± 3.0%	49%	42%	4% (Note: Hudson (L) with 2%; Brandenburg (UST) with 1%; Campbell (G) with 1%)	6%
The Washington Post/SSPG	September 10–14, 2026	803 (LV)	± 3.9%	53%	41%	5% (Note: "Would not vote" with 4%; "Someone else" with 1%)	1%
SSRS	August 31 – September 6, 2026	843 (LV)	± 4.1%	50%	41%	9% (Note: "Neither" with 5%)	—
Glengariff Group	August 31 – September 3, 2026	600 (LV)	± 4.0%	47%	43%	—	10%
EPIC-MRA	August 22–28, 2026	600 (LV)	± 4.0%	48%	44%	—	8%
EPIC-MRA	August 22–28, 2026	600 (LV)	± 4.0%	45%	41%	—	14%
Michigan State University/YouGov	August 10–20, 2026	913 (RV)	± 3.4%	49%	39%	—	8%
Michigan State University/YouGov	August 10–20, 2026	779 (LV)	± 3.4%	52%	43%	—	5%
Fabrizio Ward (R)/ Impact Research (D) (Note: Poll commissioned by AARP)	August 9–11, 2026	877 (LV)	± 3.3%	49%	44%	1%	6%
TIPP Insights (R)	August 6–10, 2026	1,528 (RV)	± 2.6%	48%	34%	6% (Note: "Someone Else" with 6%)	11%
TIPP Insights (R)	August 6–10, 2026	1,215 (LV)	± 2.7%	53%	37%	5% (Note: "Someone Else" with 5%)	5%
Beacon Research (D)/ Shaw & Co. Research (R)	August 6–10, 2026	1,006 (RV)	± 3.0%	52%	47%	—	1%
	August 4, 2026	Primary elections					
EPIC-MRA	July 24–31, 2026	600 (LV)	± 4.0%	47%	38%	—	15%
Mitchell Research & Communications	July 28–29, 2026	672 (LV)	± 3.8%	46%	44%	—	10%
Glengariff Group (Note: Poll commissioned jointly by the Michigan Education Association and Business Leaders for Michigan)	July 22–24, 2026	600 (LV)	± 4.0%	44%	39%	1%	16%
Mitchell Research & Communications	June 11–13, 2026	827 (LV)	± 3.4%	51%	40%	—	9%
TIPP Insights (R)	May 20–23, 2026	1,456 (RV)	± 2.7%	46%	35%	8% (Note: "Someone Else" with 8%)	11%
TIPP Insights (R)	May 20–23, 2026	1,163 (LV)	± 3.0%	49%	38%	6%	7%
Glengariff Group	January 27 – February 2, 2026	— (LV)	—	45%	41%	—	14%
Glengariff Group	January 27 – February 2, 2026	600 (RV)	—	45%	40%	—	15%
Glengariff Group (Note: Poll commissioned by WDIV-TV and The Detroit News)	January 2–6, 2026	600 (LV)	± 4.0%	47%	45%	1%	7%

Hypothetical polling

Jocelyn Benson vs. Perry Johnson

Poll source	Date(s) administered	Sample size	Margin of error	Jocelyn Benson (D)	Perry Johnson (R)	Other	Undecided
EPIC-MRA	July 24–31, 2026	600 (LV)	± 4.0%	48%	36%	—	16%
Mitchell Research & Communications	July 28–29, 2026	672 (LV)	± 3.8%	48%	43%	—	9%
Glengariff Group	July 22–24, 2026	600 (LV)	± 4.0%	48%	37%	2%	13%
Mitchell Research & Communications	June 11–13, 2026	827 (LV)	± 3.4%	50%	42%	—	8%

Chris Swanson vs. John James

Poll source	Date(s) administered	Sample size	Margin of error	Chris Swanson (D)	John James (R)	Other	Undecided
Glengariff Group	July 22–24, 2026	600 (LV)	± 4.0%	43%	40%	2%	15%

Chris Swanson vs. Perry Johnson

Poll source	Date(s) administered	Sample size	Margin of error	Chris Swanson (D)	Perry Johnson (R)	Other	Undecided
Glengariff Group	July 22–24, 2026	600 (LV)	± 4.0%	44%	40%	2%	14%

Jocelyn Benson vs. Mike Cox

Poll source	Date(s) administered	Sample size	Margin of error	Jocelyn Benson (D)	Mike Cox (R)	Other	Undecided
Mitchell Research & Communications	June 11–13, 2026	827 (LV)	± 3.4%	48%	41%	—	12%

Jocelyn Benson vs. Mike Cox vs. Mike Duggan

Poll source	Date(s) administered	Sample size	Margin of error	Jocelyn Benson (D)	Mike Cox (R)	Mike Duggan (I)	Undecided
Mitchell Research & Communications	May 1–7, 2026	607 (LV)	± 6.0%	41%	30%	14%	15%
Glengariff Group	January 2–6, 2026	600 (LV)	± 4.0%	34%	28%	31%	7%
Rosetta Stone Communications (R)	October 23–25, 2025	637 (LV)	± 3.9%	37%	33%	19%	11%
Glengariff Group	May 5−8, 2025	600 (RV)	± 4.0%	35%	27%	25%	13%
Glengariff Group	May 5−8, 2025	600 (RV)	± 4.0%	39%	26%	25%	10%
Mitchell Research & Communications	March 13, 2025	688 (LV)	± 3.7%	37%	35%	16%	12%

Jocelyn Benson vs. Dick DeVos vs. Mike Duggan

Poll source	Date(s) administered	Sample size	Margin of error	Jocelyn Benson (D)	Dick DeVos (R)	Mike Duggan (I)	Undecided
EPIC-MRA	February 3–8, 2025	600 (LV)	± 4.0%	31%	31%	23%	15%

Jocelyn Benson vs. Tudor Dixon vs. Mike Duggan

Poll source	Date(s) administered	Sample size	Margin of error	Jocelyn Benson (D)	Tudor Dixon (R)	Mike Duggan (I)	Undecided
Rosetta Stone Communications (R)	October 23–25, 2025	637 (LV)	± 3.9%	35%	38%	18%	9%
Glengariff Group	May 5−8, 2025	600 (RV)	± 4.0%	35%	31%	24%	10%
Glengariff Group	May 5−8, 2025	600 (RV)	± 4.0%	40%	31%	23%	6%
Mitchell Research & Communications	March 13, 2025	688 (LV)	± 3.7%	38%	36%	16%	10%

Jocelyn Benson vs. John James vs. Mike Duggan

Source of poll aggregation	Dates administered	Dates updated	Jocelyn Benson (D)	John James (R)	Mike Duggan (I)	Other/Undecided	Margin
Race to the WH	through May 7, 2026	May 14, 2026	34.8%	29.9%	20.7%	14.6%	Benson +4.9%
Real Clear Politics	January 2 – May 7, 2026	May 14, 2026	36.0%	31.0%	20.7%	12.3%	Benson +5.0%
Average			35.4%	30.5%	20.7%	13.4%	Benson +4.9%

Poll source	Date(s) administered	Sample size	Margin of error	Jocelyn Benson (D)	John James (R)	Mike Duggan (I)	Other	Undecided
Mitchell Research & Communications	May 1–7, 2026	607 (LV)	± 6.0%	42%	30%	13%	—	15%
Glengariff Group	April 28 – May 1, 2026	600 (LV)	± 4.0%	34%	29%	23%	1%	13%
Impact Research (D)	March 23–29, 2026	800 (LV)	± 3.5%	40%	36%	20%	—	4%
Michigan State University/YouGov	March 2–24, 2026	1,000 (A)	± 3.4%	27%	19%	16%	6%	33%
Michigan State University/YouGov	March 2–24, 2026	1,000 (A)	± 3.4%	30% (Note: Leaners pushed)	23%	19%	—	29%
Impact Research (D)	February 9–16, 2026	800 (LV)	± 3.5%	39%	36%	20%	—	5%
Glengariff Group	January 27 – February 2, 2026	— (LV)	—	28%	29%	30%	1%	12%
Glengariff Group	January 27 – February 2, 2026	— (LV)	—	32%	—	54%	—	14%
Glengariff Group	January 27 – February 2, 2026	— (LV)	—	—	30%	58%	—	12%
Glengariff Group	January 27 – February 2, 2026	600 (RV)	—	28%	28%	30%	1%	13%
Glengariff Group	January 27 – February 2, 2026	600 (RV)	—	31%	—	53%	—	16%
Glengariff Group	January 27 – February 2, 2026	600 (RV)	—	—	30%	57%	—	13%
Glengariff Group	January 2–6, 2026	600 (LV)	± 4.0%	32%	34%	26%	—	8%
Mitchell Research & Communications	November 18–21, 2025	616 (LV)	± 3.7%	31%	37%	18%	—	14%
EPIC-MRA	November 6–11, 2025	600 (RV)	± 4.0%	33%	34%	20%	—	13%
Rosetta Stone Communications (R)	October 23–25, 2025	637 (LV)	± 3.9%	34%	39%	18%	—	9%
Schoen Cooperman Research (D)	October 9−14, 2025	600 (LV)	± 4.0%	30%	29%	26%	—	15%
Glengariff Group	May 5−8, 2025	600 (RV)	± 4.0%	35%	34%	22%	—	9%
Glengariff Group	May 5−8, 2025	600 (RV)	± 4.0%	38%	33%	21%	—	8%
Mitchell Research & Communications	March 13, 2025	688 (LV)	± 3.7%	37%	34%	16%	—	13%
Target Insyght	February 3–8, 2025	600 (V)	± 4.0%	42%	30%	21%	—	7%

Jocelyn Benson vs. Perry Johnson vs. Mike Duggan

Poll source	Date(s) administered	Sample size	Margin of error	Jocelyn Benson (D)	Perry Johnson (R)	Mike Duggan (I)	Other	Undecided
Mitchell Research & Communications	May 1–7, 2026	607 (LV)	± 6.0%	42%	32%	13%	—	13%
Glengariff Group	April 28 – May 1, 2026	600 (LV)	± 4.0%	34%	26%	23%	1%	15%

Jocelyn Benson vs. Tom Leonard vs. Mike Duggan

Poll source	Date(s) administered	Sample size	Margin of error	Jocelyn Benson (D)	Tom Leonard (R)	Mike Duggan (I)	Undecided
Glengariff Group	January 2–6, 2026	600 (LV)	± 4.0%	34%	24%	33%	8%

Jocelyn Benson vs. Aric Nesbitt vs. Mike Duggan

Poll source	Date(s) administered	Sample size	Margin of error	Jocelyn Benson (D)	Aric Nesbitt (R)	Mike Duggan (I)	Undecided
Glengariff Group	January 2–6, 2026	600 (LV)	± 4.0%	35%	24%	32%	9%
Glengariff Group	May 5−8, 2025	600 (RV)	± 4.0%	36%	26%	25%	13%
Glengariff Group	May 5−8, 2025	600 (RV)	± 4.0%	40%	26%	25%	9%

Garlin Gilchrist vs. John James vs. Mike Duggan

Poll source	Date(s) administered	Sample size	Margin of error	Garlin Gilchrist (D)	John James (R)	Mike Duggan (I)	Undecided
Glengariff Group	May 5−8, 2025	600 (RV)	± 4.0%	29%	35%	25%	11%
Glengariff Group	May 5−8, 2025	600 (RV)	± 4.0%	33%	34%	25%	8%

Chris Swanson vs. John James vs. Mike Duggan

Poll source	Date(s) administered	Sample size	Margin of error	Chris Swanson (D)	John James (R)	Mike Duggan (I)	Undecided
Glengariff Group	May 5−8, 2025	600 (RV)	± 4.0%	30%	35%	25%	10%
Glengariff Group	May 5−8, 2025	600 (RV)	± 4.0%	33%	34%	26%	7%

Generic Democrat vs. Mike Cox vs. Mike Duggan

Poll source	Date(s) administered	Sample size	Margin of error	Generic Democrat	Mike Cox (R)	Mike Duggan (I)	Undecided
Plymouth Union Public (R)	October 8−9, 2025	600 (LV)	—	31%	28%	15%	26%

Generic Democrat vs. John James vs. Mike Duggan

Poll source	Date(s) administered	Sample size	Margin of error	Generic Democrat	John James (R)	Mike Duggan (I)	Undecided
Plymouth Union Public (R)	October 8−9, 2025	600 (LV)	—	31%	35%	12%	12%

=== Results ===
2026 Michigan gubernatorial election
Party	Candidate	Votes	%	±%
Democratic	Jocelyn Benson; Winnie Brinks	2,615,034	54.57	
Republican	John James; Jay DeBoyer	2,094,508	43.71	
Libertarian	Anthony Hudson; Beau Parmenter	44,496	0.93	
U.S. Taxpayers	Donna Brandenburg; Robert Cowper II	20,136	0.42	
Green	Douglas Campbell; Bobbie Clay	17,624	0.37	
Write-in		44	0.00	±0.00
Total votes		4,791,842	100.0	
Democratic hold				

Counties that flipped from Republican to Democratic

- Berrien (largest municipality: Niles)

Counties that flipped from Democratic to Republican

- Bay (largest municipality: Bay City)

==== By congressional district ====
Benson won nine congressional districts, including the one James represented, while James won four.

District	Benson	James	Representative
1st	43.86%	54.20%	Jack Bergman
2nd	38.81%	58.83%	John Moolenaar
3rd	57.95%	40.56%	Hillary Scholten
4th	50.64%	47.77%	Bill Huizenga (119th Congress)
4th	50.64%	47.77%	Sean McCann (120th Congress)
5th	40.95%	56.93%	Tim Walberg
6th	66.70%	31.98%	Debbie Dingell
7th	54.06%	44.29%	Tom Barrett (119th Congress)
7th	54.06%	44.29%	William Lawrence (120th Congress)
8th	53.79%	44.28%	Kristen McDonald Rivet
9th	38.34%	59.84%	Lisa McClain
10th	54.76%	43.74%	John James (119th Congress)
10th	54.76%	43.74%	Christina Hines (120th Congress)
11th	62.81%	35.92%	Haley Stevens (119th Congress)
11th	62.81%	35.92%	Jeremy Moss (120th Congress)
12th	76.98%	21.32%	Rashida Tlaib
13th	76.89%	21.36%	Shri Thanedar (119th Congress)
13th	76.89%	21.36%	Donavan McKinney (120th Congress)

== Analysis ==
=== Exit poll ===
2026 Michigan gubernatorial election (CNN)
Demographic subgroup	Benson	James	% of total vote
Ideology
Liberals	96	4	26
Moderates	63	34	41
Conservatives	12	87	33
Party
Democrats	96	3	32
Republicans	6	94	33
Independents	62	35	35
Donald Trump job approval
Approve	5	93	37
Disapprove	85	13	61
2024 presidential vote
Kamala Harris	97	2	45
Donald Trump	8	90	44
Another candidate	55	29	3
Did not vote	83	16	6
Gender
Men	49	49	46
Women	59	40	53
Income
$100,000 or more	53	46	35
$50,000-$99,999	54	45	34
Less than $50,000	58	40	32
Race/ethnicity
White	50	49	81
Latino	59	39	3
Black	90	9	10
White born-again or evangelical Christian?
Yes	19	79	18
No	62	36	82
Race by gender
White men	46	52	38
White women	52	46	42
Black men	85	13	4
Black women	92	7	6
All other voters	65	33	10
Age
18–29 years old	68	30	13
30–44 years old	60	38	21
45–64 years old	48	51	33
65 and older	53	46	33
Area type
Urban	76	23	14
Suburban	58	41	46
Rural	43	55	40
Education
College graduate	62	36	41
No college degree	49	49	59
Education by race
White college graduates	60	39	34
Non-white college graduates	73	25	7
Whites without college	42	56	47
Non-whites without college	77	21	12
Education by gender and race
White women with college degrees	65	34	17
White women without college degrees	44	54	25
White men with college degrees	54	44	16
White men without college degrees	39	58	22
Voters of color	76	22	20
Educational attainment
Advanced degree	70	29	17
Bachelor's degree	56	42	24
Associate's degree	53	46	14
Some college	50	48	23
Never attended college	46	51	23

== See also ==
- 2026 United States gubernatorial elections
- 2026 Michigan elections

== Notes ==
Partisan clients
