= Michigan's 25th Senate district =

American legislative district

Michigan's 25th State Senate district
Senator
Dan Lauwers; R–Brockway Township
- Demographics: 89.7% White; 2.3% Black; 3.8% Hispanic; 0.5% Asian; 0.1% Native American; 0.3% Other; 3.3% Multiracial
- Population (2024): 263,891

Michigan's 25th Senate district is one of 38 districts in the Michigan Senate. The 25th district was created by the 1850 Michigan Constitution, as the 1835 constitution only permitted a maximum of eight senate districts. It has been represented by Republican Dan Lauwers since 2019, succeeding fellow Republican Phil Pavlov.

== Geography ==
District 25 encompasses all of Huron and Sanilac counties, as well as parts of Macomb, St. Clair, and Tuscola counties.

=== 2011 Apportionment Plan ===
District 25, as dictated by the 2011 Apportionment Plan, was based in the Thumb, covering all of Huron, St. Clair, and Sanilac Counties and the northern reaches of Macomb County. Communities in the district include Port Huron, Richmond, Algonac, Marine City, Marysville, St. Clair, Pearl Beach, Sandusky, Bad Axe, Fort Gratiot Township, and Port Huron Township.

The district was located entirely within Michigan's 10th congressional district, and overlapped with the 32nd, 33rd, 81st, 83rd, and 84th districts of the Michigan House of Representatives. Most of the district lied along Lake Huron, and it shared a border with Canada via the St. Clair River.

== List of senators ==
Senator	Party	Dates	Residence	Notes
Josiah Russell	Democratic	1853–1854	Greenville	
Jefferson H. Beckwith	Republican	1855–1856	Lyons	
William Canfield	Republican	1857–1860	Mount Clemens	
Ira H. Butterfield	Republican	1861–1862	Utica	
Leonard B. Parker	Democratic	1863–1864	Newport	
William Lyman Bancroft	Democratic	1865–1866	Port Huron	
John Smith Jenness	Republican	1867–1868	Almont	
Richard Winsor	Republican	1869–1870	Port Austin	
John C. Waterbury	Republican	1871–1872	Lexington	
Charles V. DeLand	Republican	1873–1874	East Saginaw	
William L. Webber	Democratic	1875–1876	East Saginaw	
Wesley P. Andrus	Republican	1877–1878	Cedar Springs	
Milton B. Hine	Greenback	1879–1880	Kent County	Endorsed by the Democrats.
Henry C. Russell	Republican	1881–1882	Cedar Springs	
Aaron T. Bliss	Republican	1883–1884	Saginaw	
George Davenport	Democratic	1885–1886	Saginaw	
Daniel Campbell	Greenback	1887–1888	Bay City	Endorsed by the Republicans.
Columbus V. Tyler	Democratic	1889–1890	Bay City	
Peter Gilbert	Democratic	1891–1892	Sterling	
Samuel W. Hopkins	Republican	1893–1894	Mt. Pleasant	
Edwin O. Shaw	Republican	1895–1896	Newaygo	
W. Irving Latimer	Republican	1897–1900	Big Rapids	
Ellery C. Cannon	Republican	1901–1904	Evart	
Harry J. Kane	Republican	1905–1908	Mt. Pleasant	
Newton O. Ward	Republican	1909–1912	Stanwood	
Francis King	Republican	1913–1914	Alma	
John A. Damon	Republican	1915–1918	Mt. Pleasant	
Aaron Amon	Republican	1919–1922	Remus	
Bernie L. Case	Republican	1923–1926	Ithaca	
Charles R. Herrick	Republican	1927–1928	Fenwick	
William F. Turner	Republican	1929–1932	Morley	
Claude B. Root	Democratic	1933–1934	Greenville	
D. Hale Brake	Republican	1935–1942	Stanton	
John B. Smith	Republican	1943–1944	Alma	
Colin L. Smith	Republican	1945–1950	Big Rapids	
Milo A. Johnson	Republican	1951–1954	Greenville	
Bert J. Storey	Republican	1955–1958	Belding	Died in office.
John H. Stahlin	Republican	1959–1962	Belding	
Emil Lockwood	Republican	1963–1964	St. Louis	
Gerald R. Dunn	Democratic	1965–1966	Flushing	
Gordon Rockwell	Republican	1967–1974	Mount Morris	
Gary G. Corbin	Democratic	1975–1982	Clio	
Joe Conroy	Democratic	1983–1994	Flint	
Dianne Byrum	Democratic	1995–2002	Onondaga	
Judson Gilbert II	Republican	2003–2010	Algonac	
Phil Pavlov	Republican	2011–2018	St. Clair Township	
Dan Lauwers	Republican	2019–present	Brockway Township	

== Recent election results ==
=== 2020s ===
2026 Michigan Senate election
Primary election
Party	Candidate	Votes	%
General election
Republican	Andrew Beeler	81,077	65.41
Democratic	April L. Osentoski	42,881	34.59
Total votes		123,958	100
Republican hold			

2022 Michigan Senate election, District 25
Party	Candidate	Votes	%
Republican	Dan Lauwers (incumbent)	78,193	66.8
Democratic	Bert Van Dyke	38,811	33.2
Total votes		117,004	100
Republican hold			

=== 2018 ===
2018 Michigan Senate election, District 25
Party	Candidate	Votes	%
Republican	Dan Lauwers	66,926	64.0
Democratic	Debbie Bourgois	37,715	36.0
Total votes		104,641	100
Republican hold			

=== 2014 ===
2014 Michigan Senate election, District 25
Party	Candidate	Votes	%
Republican	Phil Pavlov	46,553	55.8
Democratic	Terry Brown	36,832	44.2
Total votes		83,385	100
Republican hold			

=== Federal and statewide results ===
Year	Office	Results
2020	President	Trump 66.4 – 32.0%
2018	Senate	James 58.9 – 38.8%
2018	Governor	Schuette 57.4 – 39.2%
2016	President	Trump 64.9 – 29.9%
2014	Senate	Land 48.0 – 46.7%
2014	Governor	Snyder 57.7 – 39.5%
2012	President	Romney 55.0 – 44.0%
2012	Senate	Stabenow 56.1 – 40.6%

== Historical district boundaries ==
Map	Description	Apportionment Plan	Notes
	Genesee County (part); Argentine Township; Burton Township; Clayton Township; Clio; Davison; Davison Township; Fenton; Fenton Township; Flint Township; Flushing Township; Forest Township; Gaines Township; Genesee Township (part); Grand Blanc; Grand Blanc Township; Montrose Township; Mount Morris; Mount Morris Township; Mundy Township; Richfield Township; Swartz Creek; Thetford Township; Vienna Township; Livingston County	1964 Apportionment Plan	
	Genesee County (part); Argentine Township; Clayton Township; Clio; Fenton; Fenton Township; Flint (part); Flint Township; Flushing; Flushing Township; Gaines Township; Montrose Township; Mount Morris; Mount Morris Township; Mundy Township; Swartz Creek; Vienna Township; Shiawassee County (part); Antrim Township; Burns Township; Caledonia Township; Corunna; Durand; Owosso (part); Venice Township; Vernon Township (part)	1972 Apportionment Plan	
	Genesee County (part); Clayton Township; Flint; Flint Township; Flushing; Flushing Township; Genesee Township (part); Swartz Creek	1982 Apportionment Plan	
	Ingham County (part); Alaiedon Township; Aurelius Township; Bunker Hill Township; East Lansing; Ingham Township; Lansing; Lansing Township; Leroy Township; Leslie; Leslie Township; Locke Township; Mason; Meridian Township; Onondaga Township; Stockbridge Township; Vevay Township; Wheatfield Township; White Oak Township; Williamston; Williamstown Township	1992 Apportionment Plan	
	Lapeer County; St. Clair County	2001 Apportionment Plan	
	Huron County; Macomb County (part); Armada Township; Memphis; New Baltimore; Richmond; Richmond Township; St. Clair County; Sanilac County	2011 Apportionment Plan	
