= Senator Beckwith =

Senator Beckwith may refer to:

- Abijah Beckwith (1784–1874), New York State Senate
- Asahel C. Beckwith (1827–1896), United States Senator-designate from Wyoming
- Jefferson H. Beckwith (1813–1865), Michigan State Senate
