= Mark Clodfelter =

American politician

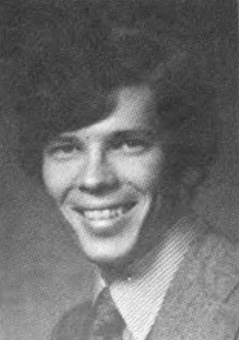

Member of the Michigan House of Representatives from the 81st district
- In office January 1, 1975 – 1980
- Preceded by: Dale Kildee
- Succeeded by: Robert L. Emerson

Personal details
- Born: August 23, 1950 (age 76) Flint, Michigan
- Party: Democratic
- Education: University of Michigan Law School

Mark Clodfelter (born August 23, 1950) is a former member of the Michigan House of Representatives.

== Early life and education ==
Clodfelter was born on August 23, 1950, in Flint, Michigan. In 1968, Clodfelter graduated from Flint Northwestern High School. Clodfield earned a bachelor's of arts and a master of arts degree in political science from the University of Michigan. Clodfelter earned a juris doctor degree from the University of Michigan Law School.

== Career ==
Clodfelter was a poverty lawyer, and a member of the Michigan and Genesee County Bar Associations. He was also a member of the American Civil Liberties Union. On November 5, 1974, Clodfelter was elected to the Michigan House of Representatives, where he represented the 81st district. He was sworn in on January 8, 1975. In 1976, Clodfelter served as a delegate to the Democratic National Convention. In 1977, was an unsuccessful candidate in the Democratic primary for the Michigan Senate seat representing the 29th district. Clodfelter resigned in 1980.

== Personal life ==
Clodfelter married in 1971.

== Electoral history ==
Mark Clodfelter electoral history

1974 Michigan House of Representatives 81st district Democratic primary
Party	Candidate	Votes	%
Democratic	Mark Clodfelter	3,356	37.29
Democratic	Gerald R. Brown	2,379	26.44
Democratic	Jack D. Minore	1,823	20.26
Democratic	Louise M. Davis	754	8.38
Democratic	Lawrence B. Murphy Jr.	364	4.04
Democratic	Diane Kemp Barnum	323	3.59
Total votes		8,999	100

1974 Michigan House of Representatives 81st district general election
Party	Candidate	Votes	%
Democratic	Mark Clodfelter	13,591	70.31
Republican	Robert W. Busha	5,527	28.59
Human Rights	John Lord	213	1.10
Total votes		19,331	100

1976 Michigan House of Representatives 81st district Democratic primary
Party	Candidate	Votes	%
Democratic	Mark Clodfelter	7,628	100
Total votes		7,628	100

1976 Michigan House of Representatives 81st district general election
Party	Candidate	Votes	%
Democratic	Mark Clodfelter	20,696	78.79
Republican	Val E. Rose	5,388	20.51
Libertarian	Paul Joseph Harcz Jr.	184	0.70
Total votes		26,268	100

1978 Michigan House of Representatives 81st district Democratic primary
Party	Candidate	Votes	%
Democratic	Mark Clodfelter	6,262	100
Total votes		6,262	100

1978 Michigan House of Representatives 81st district general election
Party	Candidate	Votes	%
Democratic	Mark Clodfelter	15,611	100
Total votes		15,611	100
