= Wesley P. Andrus =

American politician

Member of the Michigan Senate from the 25th district
- In office January 1, 1877 – 1878
- Preceded by: William L. Webber
- Succeeded by: Milton B. Hine

Personal details
- Born: February 19, 1834 Potter, New York, U.S.
- Died: 1898 (aged 63–64) Cedar Springs, Michigan, U.S.
- Party: Republican
- Spouse: Alice T. Thomas

Military service
- Allegiance: United States Army (Union Army)
- Years of service: 1861-1864
- Rank: Captain
- Battles/wars: American Civil War

Wesley P. Andrus (February 19, 1834 – 1898) was a Michigan politician.

== Early life ==
Andrus was born on February 19, 1834, in Potter, New York.

== Military career ==
In 1861, Andrus joined the 42nd Illinois Infantry Regiment, where he was promoted to the rank of captain from the rank first lieutenant. Andrus was wounded at the battle of Missionary Ridge, and was discharged due to disability in May 1864.

== Political career ==
On November 7, 1876, Andrus was elected to the Michigan Senate where he represented the 25th district from January 3, 1877, to 1878.

== Death ==
Andrus died in 1898 in Cedar Springs, Michigan.
