= Judson Gilbert II =

American politician

Judson S. Gilbert II

Member of the Michigan House of Representatives from the 81st district
- In office January 1, 2011 – December 31, 2012
- Preceded by: Phil Pavlov
- Succeeded by: Dan Lauwers

Member of the Michigan Senate from the 25th district
- In office January 1, 2003 – December 31, 2010
- Preceded by: Dianne Byrum
- Succeeded by: Phil Pavlov

Member of the Michigan House of Representatives from the 82nd district
- In office January 1, 1999 – December 31, 2002
- Preceded by: Karen Willard
- Succeeded by: John Stahl

Personal details
- Born: January 22, 1952 (age 74)
- Party: Republican

Judson "Jud" Gilbert II (born January 22, 1952) was a member of the Michigan Legislature. Immediately prior to this term (2010-2012) he was a member of the Michigan State Senate, where he has served since 2002. Prior to that he was a member of the Michigan House of Representatives from 1998 to 2002. Gilbert is a Roman Catholic. In 2010 Gilbert was elected to a third term in the Michigan State House.

Gilbert's House district covered most of St. Clair County. His former Senate District covered all of St. Clair County and Lapeer County He is a native of Algonac. He graduated from Algonac High School and St. Clair County Community College. He later went to Wayne State University, where he studied mortuary science. He then spent several years as a funeral home director.

Gilbert is term limited and thus not running for re-election in 2010. However, since the term limit in the state house is 3 terms and he only served two, Gilbert is running for the State House District 81.

While in the State Senate Gilbert was an early fighter for replacing the Single Business Tax and was endorsed by the state chamber of commerce for these actions. Gilbert is the chair of the Senate Transportation Committee and as such has been involved in negotiations to build the Detroit River International Crossing. He has stalled this project to some extent with his inquiries about particulars of the project, such as who will pay the owners of the land condemned to build the bridge crossings and what will happen if toll revenue is below projections.

== Sources ==
- Vote Smart bio
- Gilbert's official web page
- Michigan Votes profile for Gilbert
- Aug. 4, 2010 Times Herald article on Gilbert
