= Marni Sawicki =

American politician (born 1969/70)

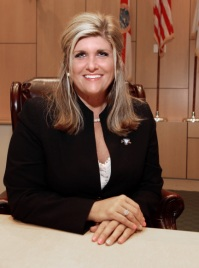

Mayor of Cape Coral
- In office 2013–2017
- Preceded by: John Sullivan
- Succeeded by: Joe Coviello

Personal details
- Born: Marni Lin Sawicki; 1969 or 1970 (age 55–56) Battle Creek, Michigan, U.S.
- Party: Democratic
- Education: Central Michigan University (BA); University of Phoenix (MBA)

Marni Lin Sawicki (born 1969/1970) is an American politician and businesswoman who served as the mayor of Cape Coral, Florida, from 2013 to 2017. She was the first woman to hold this position in the city's history. She is a Democrat.

== Early life and education ==
Sawicki was born in Battle Creek, Michigan. She earned a bachelor’s degree in Communications from Central Michigan University and later obtained a Master of Business Administration (MBA) from the University of Phoenix.

== Career ==
Before entering public office, Sawicki worked in the private sector, including roles in management and marketing. She spent over two decades in the insurance industry and founded a consulting firm, Indigo Pros, in 2013.

=== Mayor of Cape Coral ===
In November 2013, Sawicki was elected mayor of Cape Coral, narrowly defeating incumbent John Sullivan by 121 votes. Her election marked the first time a woman held the position in the city. During her tenure, her administration prioritized city development initiatives and community preparedness, including a $750,000 grant from the Federal Emergency Management Agency (FEMA) to train residents in disaster preparedness.

She was a member of the Florida League of Cities, the Florida League of Mayors, the Florida Municipal Trust, and the U.S. Conference of Mayors. She was twice honored as a "Home Rule Hero" by the Florida League of Cities and was named one of 2015's "Elected Women of Excellence" by the National Foundation for Women Legislators, selecting her as one of just 18 female legislators from across the U.S.

In 2014, Sawicki became the first mayor in Southwest Florida to sign the Freedom to Marry pledge supporting same-sex marriage. Later that year, she supported the establishment of a domestic partnership registry in Cape Coral, which passed with a 5–3 vote, making it the first such registry in Lee County.

==== Bimini Basin Project ====
As mayor, Sawicki supported the Bimini Basin Project, a redevelopment plan for a waterfront area in Cape Coral. In September 2014, under her leadership, the city council approved funding for a feasibility study by the University of South Florida's School of Architecture & Community Design. Though the project faced delays, it eventually broke ground in October 2023 as a $120 million development.

==== Disaster preparedness training ====
Following participation in a leadership program, Sawicki helped secure a $750,000 FEMA grant for disaster preparedness training. The program began in 2015 and involved training for city personnel.

==== Ethics inquiry ====
In 2016, a complaint was filed with the Florida Commission on Ethics, alleging that Sawicki had accepted gifts from a local businessman without properly disclosing them as required by state law. The Florida Department of Law Enforcement also opened an investigation into Sawicki's office in the summer of 2017. In March 2018, both the Ethics Commission and the FDLE cleared Sawicki of any wrongdoing.

== Later career ==
Sawicki chose not to seek re-election in 2017 and returned to private sector work. In 2021, she returned to Michigan and became the general manager for Crossroads Mall before moving on to work as a regional asset manager for Summit Properties USA. She later announced her candidacy for the Democratic nomination for governor of Michigan in 2026.

== Personal life ==
Sawicki was previously married to Adam Sawicki in 1995, with whom she had two children. They divorced in October 2007. She later married Kenneth Retzer in June 2016 and divorced in October 2016. The couple's relationship gained public attention after a 2017 domestic violence incident, which led to Kenneth's arrest and a subsequent guilty plea. Sawicki went on to marry Gregory Bennett when she moved back to Michigan in May 2023.

In 2016, a Lee County judge granted an 8-day extension of a restraining order that Sawicki filed against her former boyfriend, Cape Coral firefighter Lt. Kenneth Retzer. Fox 4 Now reported that Retzer allegedly sent threatening messages and attended city council meetings after their relationship ended. They were married for a short time in 2016.

In June 2017, while attending a conference in Miami Beach, Sawicki reported an incident of domestic violence involving Retzer. He was arrested and later pled guilty in January 2018.

== Bibliography ==
- Sawicki, Marni. Ms. Mayor: How Republicans and My Ex-Husband Tried to Ruin My Life. 2022. ISBN 9798887960050
