= Phil Pavlov =

American politician

Phillip Pavlov

Member of the Michigan Senate from the 25th district
- In office January 1, 2011 – December 31, 2018
- Preceded by: Judson Gilbert II
- Succeeded by: Dan Lauwers

Member of the Michigan House of Representatives from the 81st district
- In office January 1, 2005 – December 31, 2010
- Preceded by: Lauren Hager
- Succeeded by: Judson Gilbert II

Personal details
- Born: May 26, 1963 (age 63) Port Huron, Michigan
- Party: Republican
- Education: Attended St. Clair Community College.

Phil Pavlov (born May 26, 1963) is a former Republican member of the Michigan Senate, representing the 25th district (Huron, Sanilac, and St. Clair counties and the northeast corner of Macomb County) from 2011 until 2018. He previously served three terms in the House of Representatives, and, for one term, was a member of the St. Clair County Board of Commissioners.

Pavlov ran for the United States House of Representatives seat from the Michigan's 10th congressional district, following Candice Miller's decision not to run for reelection. He lost the Republican primary election to Paul Mitchell.

In June, 2018, Pavlov voted to give senior citizens the option of a capped auto-insurance policy.
