= Dan Lauwers =

American politician (born 1963)

Member of the Michigan Senate from the 25th district
- Incumbent
- Assumed office January 1, 2019
- Preceded by: Phil Pavlov

Majority Leader of the Michigan House of Representatives
- In office January 11, 2017 – January 9, 2019
- Preceded by: Aric Nesbitt
- Succeeded by: Triston Cole

Member of the Michigan House of Representatives from the 81st district
- In office January 1, 2013 – January 1, 2019
- Preceded by: Judson Gilbert II
- Succeeded by: Gary Eisen

Personal details
- Born: January 15, 1963 (age 63) Almont, Michigan, U.S.
- Party: Republican
- Spouse: Kellie
- Children: 3
- Education: Michigan State University (BS)

Daniel Victor Lauwers (born January 15, 1963) is a member of the Michigan Senate, representing the 25th district. He previously served in the Michigan House of Representatives and represented the 81st district, made up of the areas just south of Port Huron, Michigan along the St. Clair River, that are functional suburbs of Detroit with additional business related to the water tourism, combined with an inland area to the west of Port Huron that is largely still rural farm country with small towns that largely function as trade centers, and only very limited influx of commuters to the Metro-Detroit area.

Lauwers comes from the more rural western portion of the district, and has a bachelor's degree in agricultural economics from Michigan State University. Lauwers owns Eastern Michigan Grain. He was a legislative assistant to Bill Schuette when Schutte was in the US House of Representatives. Lauwers was first elected to the state house in 2012. He also runs Nick Lauwers Farms with his son Nick. His wife Kellie is currently being investigated for embezzlement from the Yale chamber of commerce where she held the position of secretary since 2019 as reported in the Yale Expositor

Michigan House of Representatives
Preceded by Aric Nesbitt	Majority Leader of the Michigan House of Representatives; 2017–2019	Succeeded by Triston Cole
