= Perry Johnson (businessman) =

American businessman and political candidate

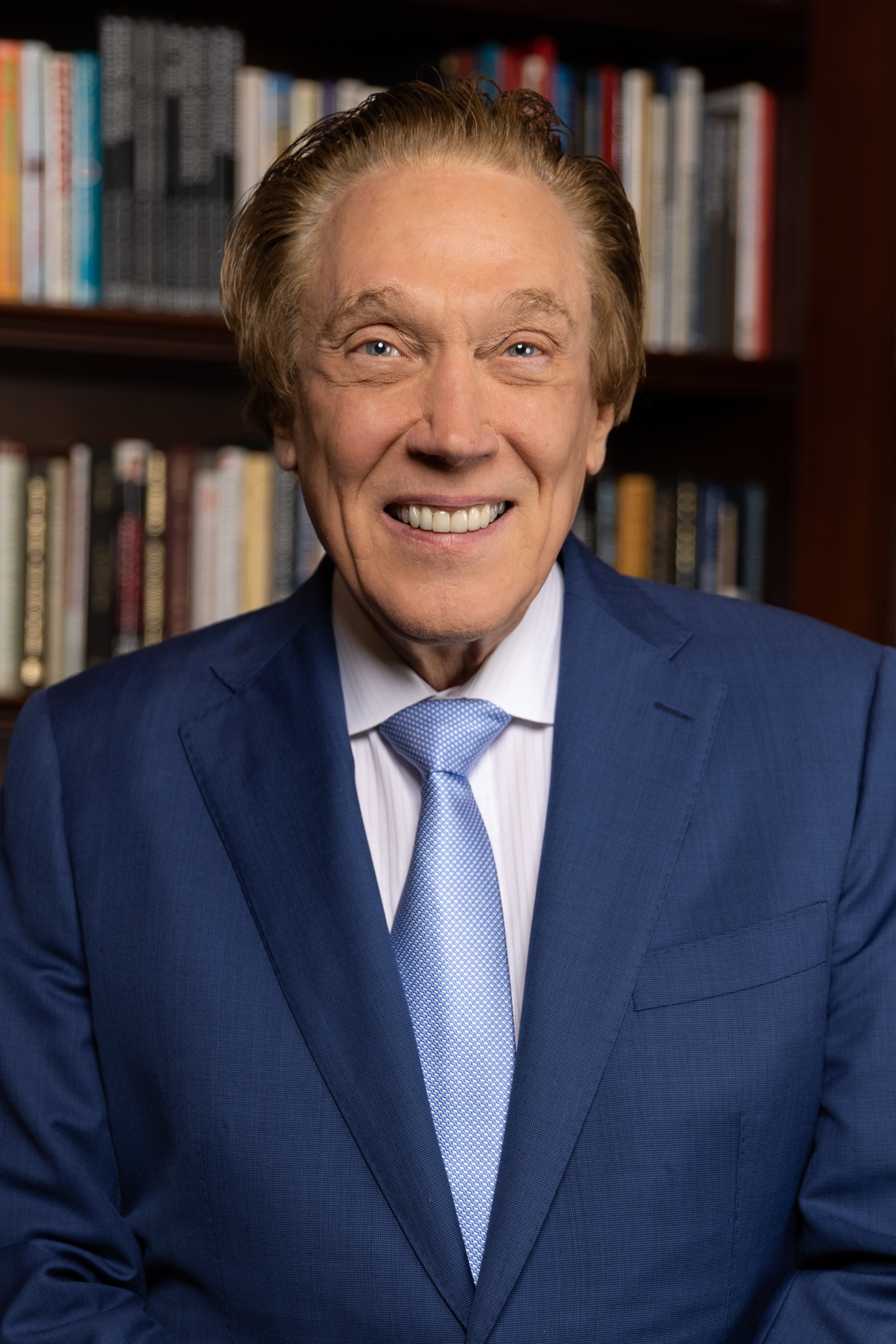
- Johnson in 2023
- Born: Perry Lawrence Johnson; January 23, 1948 (age 78); Dolton, Illinois, U.S.
- Education: University of Illinois, Urbana-Champaign (BS); University of Detroit
- Political party: Republican
- Spouse: Diana Johnson (m. 2008)
- Children: 3
- Website: Official website

Perry Lawrence Johnson (born January 23, 1948) is an American businessman, author, and perennial candidate from Michigan. Johnson has written several books on international quality control standards and certification and made most of his money running an ISO 9000 registrar firm. His registrar firm would have its license suspended by the U.S. Registrar Accreditation Board, while his consulting firm was subject to a lawsuit for running a junk fax scam.

He was one of over ten Republican candidates for governor of Michigan in 2022, but was disqualified when the Bureau of Elections reported too few valid signatures on his ballot petition, as over 9,000 signatures were illegally harvested. He sought the 2024 Republican nomination for president of the United States running against Donald Trump, but withdrew from the race on October 20, 2023, before the primaries. Due to this, he has been labeled by Trump's political operation as a "Never Trumper." He ran again for governor in the 2026 election, but lost in the primary to the Trump-backed congressman John James.

== Early life and education ==
Perry Johnson was born to Dorothy and Carl Johnson on January 23, 1948, in Dolton, Illinois. He has a younger sister, Valerie, born in 1949, and a brother, David. At age 14, Johnson started attending Thornridge High School. He holds a degree in mathematics from the University of Illinois Urbana-Champaign, with a minor in economics, and completed coursework in the graduate program for psychology at the University of Detroit, but never received a graduate degree.

== Business career ==
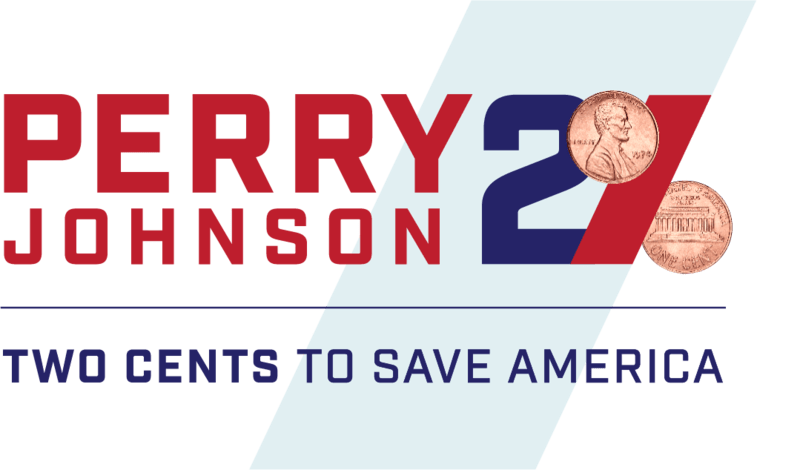
Perry Johnson's Two Cents To Save America logo

Johnson has a background in the area of quality and has published several works related to the subject, including ISO 9000: Meeting the International Standards. He is the president of Perry Johnson International Holdings.

Johnson is also the author of Two Cents To Save America, a political work discussing fiscal and sociological issues from a right-wing perspective.

=== ISO Standards ===
Johnson is a speaker and author of books and training materials on numerous ISO standards, including the ISO 9000 Series, the ISO 14000 Series, and the AS9100 standard for aerospace. He authored the textbook ISO 9000: Meeting the New International Standards, followed by its second and third editions, with the latest published in 2000. Johnson also wrote Keeping Score: Strategies and Tactics for Winning the Quality War, which was first published in 1989. He also authored various other textbooks, including:

- ISO 14000 Road Map to Registration
- ISO 14000: The Business Manager's Complete Guide to Environmental Management
- ISO/QS-9000 Yearbook: 1997

==== ISO 9000 and QS9000 ====
In 1983, Johnson founded Perry Johnson, Inc. which presented seminars on quality standards, and since its inception, the ISO 9000 standards. In 1994, General Motors, Chrysler, and Ford Motor Company—the "Big Three," switched to QS9000, requiring all suppliers to receive QS9000 certification. Johnson's firm was one of the first to supply QS9000 certifications.

The development of QS9000 standards helped prevent the "Japanese invasion," i.e. the production of highly efficient and cheap cars that arose from Japan's ubiquitous, rigid quality standards, said Carla Bailo, CEO of the Center of Automotive Research.

=== Perry Johnson Registrars, Inc. ===
Johnson founded Perry Johnson Registrars in 1994 to certify and register companies' compliance with various ISO standards. Since 1994, PJR has expanded internationally, and as of June 2023, it has offices in 12 countries.

Following a complaint from Boeing alleging conflict of interest violations, PJR was suspended by the U.S. Registrar Accreditation Board, which prevented it from issuing aerospace certifications. The firm was also suspended by the Japan Accreditation Board of Conformity Assessment. It sued over this suspension in 2004, but the board never responded in court.

=== Perry Johnson Laboratory Accreditation, Inc. ===
Johnson is the founder and owner of Perry Johnson Laboratory Accreditation, Inc., a private accrediting body that "validates the competency of testing and calibration laboratories, inspection bodies, reference material producers and sampling organizations through the use of international and national standards." He also owns Perry Johnson Laboratory Accreditation NP, Inc., a nonprofit accreditation organization to be used in place of the PJLA in cases where a nonprofit organization is requisite.

=== Consulting firm ===
On October 9, 2000, a lawsuit against Johnson's consulting firm, Perry Johnson, Inc. was filed for sending 'junk faxes' en masse. This was a result of the FCC citing Perry Johnson Inc. for violating the TCPA by mass faxing. Johnson's firm agreed to pay up to $424.75 in compensation to any company or person who had received a 'junk fax.' His firm was also required to place an ad in USA Today detailing the compensation rules and create a website inviting recipients of unsolicited faxes to receive compensation. A previous lawsuit had been filed alleging that Johnson's firm had sent 11.7 million unsolicited faxes for nine years, but it was dismissed as the plaintiffs had sued Johnson himself instead of his company.

Perry Johnson & Associates medical records data breach

In 2023, a company associated with Johnson, Perry Johnson & Associates (PJ&A), a medical transcription service provider, experienced a large-scale data breach affecting millions of individuals. Unauthorized access to the company's systems reportedly began in March 2023, though public notifications to affected individuals did not begin until October 2023.

The breach exposed protected health information (PHI), including names, dates of birth, addresses, Social Security numbers, medical record numbers, diagnoses, laboratory results, medications, and clinical notes. Estimates of the number of affected individuals range from approximately 9 million to 13 million.

Several healthcare organizations were impacted through their relationship with PJ&A, including Cook County Health in Illinois. Reports indicated that millions of patients across multiple states were affected.

Following the breach, multiple lawsuits were filed alleging inadequate data security practices. These cases were later consolidated into a multi-district litigation (MDL) proceeding in the United States District Court for the Eastern District of New York.

In June 2024, reports indicated that the United States Department of Justice had initiated an investigation related to the incident.

== Political activities ==
=== 2022 Michigan gubernatorial campaign ===
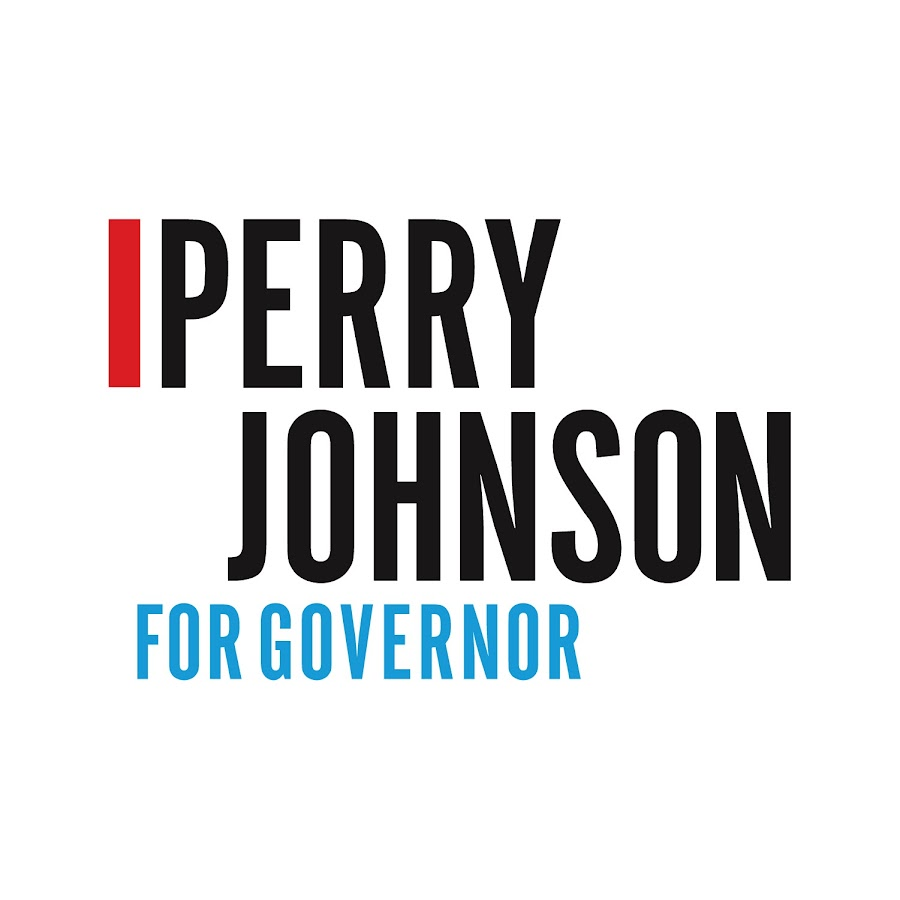
Johnson's 2022 gubernatorial campaign logo

In 2021, Johnson announced his candidacy for the Republican nomination for the governor of Michigan. He launched his campaign in January 2021 with a $1.5 million advertising campaign that was featured during the 2021 Super Bowl. Johnson did not meet the requirement of 15,000 valid signatures necessary to appear on the ballot after it was found that 9,400 of the signatures his campaign submitted were invalid and fraudulent. He filed suit in federal court to halt the ballot printing so he could argue why he should be included on the ballot, but he and two other candidates, Michael Markey and James Craig, had their appeals to remain on the ballot rejected by the state Supreme Court, which reiterated their fraudulent nature, with signatures harvested by paid circulators. In total, Johnson spent $7,000,000 of his own money in his failed bid for the Republican nomination.

Nearly a year after his failed gubernatorial campaign, Shawn Wilmoth, Jamie Wilmoth, and Willie Reed faced over 20 charges from a Detroit court for their role in the fraudulent signature scheme. Johnson "applauded the charges."

=== 2024 presidential campaign ===
Perry Johnson
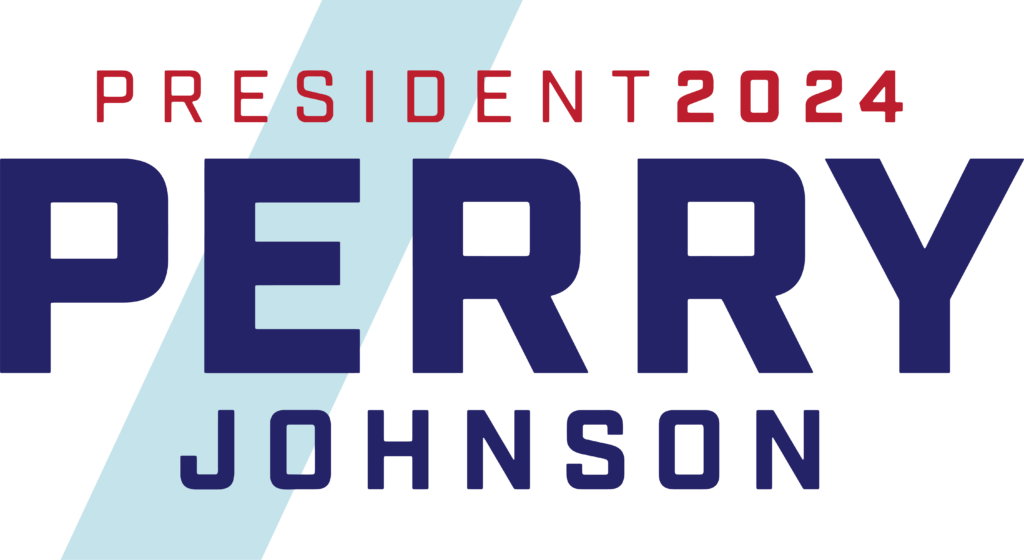
- Campaign: 2024 Republican primaries; 2024 U.S. presidential election
- Candidate: Perry Johnson
- Affiliation: Republican Party
- Status: Announced: March 2, 2023; Suspended: October 20, 2023
- Headquarters: Troy, Michigan
- Slogan: Two Cents To Save America

Website
- www.perryjohnson.com

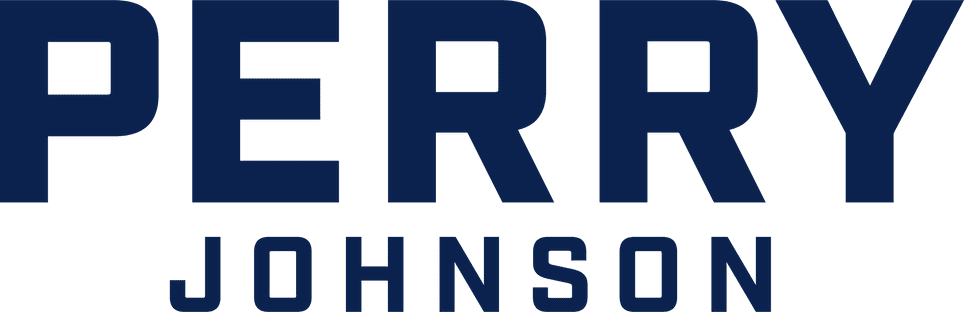
Johnson's initial presidential campaign logo, February - March

Johnson ran a Super Bowl commercial in Iowa on February 12, 2023, announcing his intention to run for president in 2024. On March 2, 2023, Johnson formally announced his bid, filling out a Federal Election Commission filing. At the 2023 Conservative Political Action Conference, he received five percent of the presidential straw poll vote, coming in third behind former president Donald Trump and Florida governor Ron DeSantis.

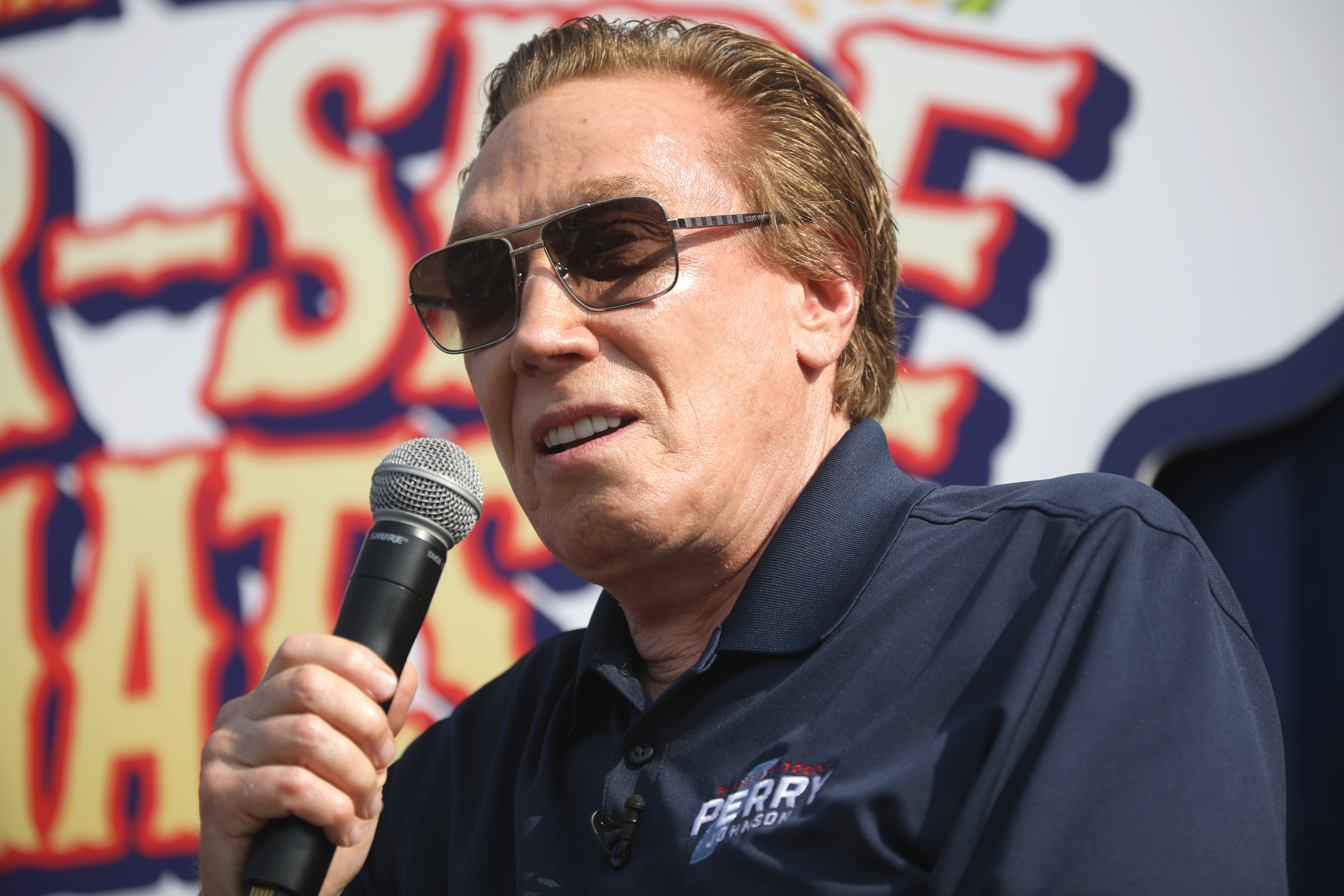
Johnson in August 2023

Johnson consistently struggled with achieving the donor and polling requirements outlined by the Republican National Committee, and actively pursued ways to circumvent them. This includes an attempt to increase the number of people donating to his campaign by selling $1 t-shirts on Facebook saying "I stand with Tucker" amidst his firing from Fox News and counting each sale as a donation to his campaign. Additionally, the Johnson campaign handed out $10 gas-cards to anyone willing to make a $1 donation to his campaign. Johnson was also accused by Semafor of paying media companies to pay attention to his campaign namely engaging in a "pay-to-play" agreement with Newsmax. Vivek Ramaswamy claimed that a similar offer was made to him, and he rejected it. Newsmax has denied both the claim from Ramaswamy and the claims about Johnson.

Johnson spent over $2,000,000 in campaign ads prior to the first Republican national debate and claimed to have qualified for the debate on August 18, 2023, and claimed to have had a meeting with Fox to do a rehearsal and walk-through of the debate process on August 22, only to receive a call on August 23 stating that he didn't qualify. Johnson submitted polls from two companies, The Trafalgar Group and Victory Insights, that at face value met the proper requirements. However, the only accredited poll that Johnson saw a 1% return, would be disqualified due to the RNC stating that the pollster, Victory Insights, did not meet their criteria. Johnson's campaign also submitted three polls, one national and two local, by the Trafalgar Group, however, the national poll was not accepted by the RNC for having a sample size smaller than 800. As such, Johnson did not appear at the debate. In response to this, alongside Larry Elder who also submitted the Trafalgar poll and failed to qualify, Johnson stated he would pursue legal action against the RNC and demanded the resignation of RNC chairwoman Ronna McDaniel.

Johnson claimed to have met the 50,000 donor requirement to attend the second Republican debate, however, "he [was] all but invisible in the polls" and did not qualify. Johnson suspended his campaign for president on October 20, 2023, citing a lack of movement in the polls, and his failure to qualify for either of the debates. He endorsed Donald Trump. Trump commended Johnson for giving a "valiant effort" in the primaries and said the endorsement was a "great honor." Johnson spoke at the 2024 Republican National Convention saying that "[Trump] has the heart of a lion, the brain of a genius" and that "I am ready to do whatever is necessary to get Trump back in the White House." He also would later speak at the Michigan Republican Party's 2025 convention.

=== 2026 Michigan gubernatorial campaign ===
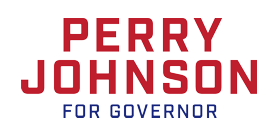
Johnson's logo for his bid for governor of Michigan in the 2026 election

On January 26, 2026, Johnson announced his candidacy for governor of Michigan in the 2026 election. Perry centered his campaign on his vow to run Michigan "like a business." Johnson would poll alongside Representative John James and Michigan Attorney General Mike Cox in a close race with all three candidates vying for an Endorsement from Trump. As of July 2026 Johnson has self-financed over $30 million on his gubernatorial campaign.

On June 22, 2026, Donald Trump endorsed James for governor, with Cox dropping out on July 17 citing Trump's strength as leader of the Republican Party. Despite Trump's endorsement Johnson has chosen to stay in the race, stating that James "can't win" the general election due to his history of "losing" namely in the 2018 and 2020 senatorial elections even though Johnson himself has never won an election he stood in. On July 27 Johnson held a "Trump Tailgate" to which Trump's campaign responded that Johnson is a "NEVER TRUMPER who ran against [Donald Trump] in the 2024 election." Johnson responded by saying that “Trump endorsed liberal John James" and “Trump-backed statewide candidates... all came up short when it mattered most.” In the final days of the campaign Johnson labeled James a "DEI candidate" and accused James of playing the "race card." In response. the Trump team doubled down on denouncing Johnson, highlighting that he has spent $70 million on his various bids for office and $30 million on his 2026 campaign. Johnson's campaign heavily outspent James, spending $32 million on radio ads alone, while James' spent just $2.4 million.

NBC called the race for James at 10:15pm. Despite that Johnson refused to concede until 1:07am vowing to continue to lead his "MEGA Movement." In an interview with WJBK on August 10, 2026, Johnson announced that he would be focusing on running his standards business claiming to be "the Registrar of the United States."

== Political positions ==
=== Social issues ===
Johnson is strongly against abortion, believing that life begins at conception. When he ran for Governor of Michigan in 2022, Johnson did not rule out banning abortion for survivors of rape and sexual assault, stating "two wrongs don't make a right". Johnson believes abortion to be an issue of states' rights, though he's expressed support for national restrictions.

Johnson is a vocal supporter of a federal ban on gender-affirming care for transgender minors, stating "never again will we allow transition therapy for minors. It is child abuse."

=== Fiscal policy ===
His Presidential campaign slogan was "Two cents to save America", referencing the centerpiece of his campaign, a policy to cut 2 cents off every dollar of federal discretionary spending "year after year." Johnson believes that this policy will solve the US debt crisis. He voiced support for the policy to be performed in Michigan if he was elected governor.

In his 2026 campaign for governor of Michigan Perry proposed a "MEGA audit" of the state's finances akin to the DOGE and promised to run the state like a business. He also stated that this audit would not be run by either the Office of the Auditor General, nor the Office of Internal Audit Services, the state bodies which would normally perform such an act.

=== Federal agencies ===
Johnson promised to wholly "eliminate" the FBI, calling it a "corrupt" agency that is "beyond saving." He also announced that if elected, he would press for "bonuses" to any government agency that saves 2% of its annual budget, such that "its manager [sic] would receive a portion of the savings."

Johnson has also vowed that he would use the executive power of the presidency to abolish the Department of Education.

=== Foreign policy ===
Johnson has criticized the Russo-Ukrainian War, disapproving of American involvement and questioning the amount of U.S. aid sent. Johnson has proposed using executive orders to halt spending to Ukraine.

=== Donald Trump and the 2020 election ===
Johnson is an ardent supporter of president Donald Trump, having supported his presidential bid in 2016, 2020, and 2024. Following Joe Biden's victory in the 2020 presidential election and Donald Trump's refusal to concede over false allegations of electoral fraud, Johnson supported Trump's false claim, alleging "incredible fraud" had occurred. Johnson had branded himself as Donald Trump "without the baggage." However, Johnson also stated that he would pardon Trump from federal prosecution. In 2023, Johnson established the "Defend Them" Political Action Committee with the primary objective of financing the legal defense of individuals facing accusations related to the 2020 presidential election. Johnson would personally pledge to match donations up to a maximum of $1 million in support of this cause.

During his 2026 gubernatorial bid he refused to drop out of the race in favor of the Trump endorsed candidate, John James, while still trying to appear as pro-Trump. For this he has been labeled by the Trump campaign as a Never Trumper.

== Personal life ==
Johnson is a Catholic residing in Bloomfield Hills, Michigan. He is married and has three sons.

He holds the position of president of Perry Johnson International Holdings and several other companies, and in 2021, he formed the Perry Johnson Foundation, a non-profit charitable organization.

As a bridge player, Johnson has won five National Bridge Championships. He has also participated in the World Championships on six occasions, with his best showing being an eighth-place overall finish during the 1998 Championship in Lille, France.
