= Gary Eisen =

American politician

Member of the Michigan House of Representatives from the 81st district
- In office January 1, 2019 – January 1, 2023
- Preceded by: Dan Lauwers
- Succeeded by: Rachel Hood (redistricting)

Personal details
- Born: February 1, 1955 (age 71) St. Clair, Michigan
- Party: Republican
- Other political affiliations: Independent (2010)
- Spouse: Annie
- Website: Gary Eisen

Gary R. Eisen (born February 1, 1955) is a Republican member of the Michigan House of Representatives.

== Early life ==
On February 1, 1955, Eisen was born in St. Clair, Michigan.

== Career ==
Eisen unsuccessfully ran as an independent in the 2010 Michigan House of Representatives election for the 81st district. He also ran for the 81st district in 2012, but was defeated in the Republican primary by Dan Lauwers.

Eisen owns a small business, Eisen Inc., that provides welding, fabricating and repair services. Eisen also teaches American Warrior Martial Arts classes. Eisen is a life member of the National Rifle Association of America.

=== Electoral College controversy ===
On the morning of December 14, 2020, the day that Michigan's electors to the Electoral College were set to meet at the capital, Eisen claimed on WPHM Radio there would be a "Hail Mary" effort regarding a plan to prevent electors from casting a vote. When asked if he can assure the public that it will be a safe day in Lansing, and that nobody would get hurt, Eisen replied, "No. I don't know. Because what we're doing today is uncharted."

Shortly after the interview, Michigan Republican House speaker Lee Chatfield and Speaker-Elect Jason Wentworth released a statement disavowing any threat of violence or intimidation. The two leaders also announced that Eisen would be removed from his committee assignments for the rest of the term. Shortly after, Eisen clarified his comments, stating his intent was to "help prevent violence, not promote it."

== Personal life ==
Eisen's wife is Annie Eisen.

Political offices
Preceded by Dan Lauwers	Michigan Representatives; 81st District; 2019–present	Succeeded by Incumbent
