= Milton B. Hine =

American politician (1828–1881)

Member of the Michigan Senate from the 25th district
- In office January 1, 1879 – December 31, 1880
- Preceded by: Wesley P. Andrus
- Succeeded by: Henry C. Russell

Personal details
- Born: February 2, 1828 Meredith, New York
- Died: September 1, 1881 (aged 53) Lowell, Michigan
- Party: Democratic (until 1874); Greenback (after 1874)
- Education: Delaware Literary Institute

Milton B. Hine (February 2, 1828 – September 1, 1881) was a Michigan politician.

== Early life and education ==
Milton B. Hine was born on February 2, 1828, in Meredith, New York. His parents, Demas and Sally Hine, were both from Connecticut. Demas Hine was a medical doctor. In New York state, Milton received a public school education, and was later educated at the Delaware Literary Institute. In the autumn of 1847, Milton moved to a farm in Cannon Township in Kent County, Michigan.

== Career ==
In 1871, Hine became the president and treasurer of the Farmers' Mutual Fire Insurance Company of Kent County. He would hold these positions in the insurance company for the rest of his life. In political affiliation, Hine was a life-long Democrat until the formation of the Greenback Party in 1874. On August 7, 1878, in Grand Rapids, Hine was nominated by the Kent County Greenback Convention for the Michigan Senate seat representing the 25th district. The nomination was backed by the Kent County Democratic Committee. On November 5, 1878, Hine defeated incumbent Republican Wesley P. Andrus. He served in the state senate from January 1, 1879, to January 1, 1881. In 1880, Hine put one of his son-in-laws in charge of his farmlands, so he could retire in Lowell, Michigan. He then started a shoe and boot dealing firm by the name of Hawk & Hine.

== Personal life ==
In 1850, Hine married Polly Ann Hartwell. Together, they had two daughters. Hine was a Freemason.

== Death ==
Hine died on September 1, 1881, of typhoid fever in Lowell, after four weeks of suffering with the illness. He was interred at Oakwood Cemetery in Lowell.
