= Rachel Hood (politician) =

American politician

Member of the Michigan House of Representatives
- In office January 1, 2019 – December 31, 2024
- Preceded by: Winnie Brinks
- Succeeded by: Stephen Wooden
- Constituency: 76th district (2019–2022); 81st district (2023–2024)

Personal details
- Party: Democratic
- Education: Michigan State University
- Website: House website Campaign website

Rachel Hood (born October 12, 1976) is an American politician from Michigan. Hood was a Democratic member of Michigan House of Representatives from the old District 76, but later represented District 81.

== Early life ==
On October 12, 1976, Hood was born in Grand Rapids, Michigan or Livonia, Michigan.

== Education ==
In 1999, Hood earned a Bachelor of Science degree in Social Relations from Michigan State University.

== Early career ==
In 2000, Hood started her career as an executive director of West Grand Neighborhood Organization, where she was involved in crime prevention and community development. In 2005, Hood was a Community Relations Manager at Metro Health Hospital in Wyoming, Michigan. Hood is a co-founder of Local First. Hood served as executive director of the West Michigan Environmental Action Council from 2007 - 2016. Hood is a consultant at Dig Deep Research.

In the 2016 elections in Kent County, Hood ran for Drain Commissioner but lost the election in a close race.

== State legislature ==
On November 6, 2018, Hood won the election and became a Democratic member of Michigan House of Representatives for District 76. Hood defeated Amanda Brand with 60% of the vote. Hood successfully ran for re-election in 2020 with 62% of the vote. She ran successfully for her third consecutive term in 2022, this time for the 81st House District, due to statewide re-districting. She ran against one-term State Representative Lynn Afendoulis of Grand Rapids and won with 55% of the vote.

Hood retired from the state House in 2024. She was succeeded by Stephen Wooden.

== Personal life ==
Hood's husband is Dave Petroelje. They have two children, Evelyn and Ineke. Hood and her family live in Grand Rapids, Michigan.

== See also ==
- 2018 Michigan House of Representatives election
- 2020 Michigan House of Representatives election
- 2022 Michigan House of Representatives election
