= Jay DeBoyer =

American politician from Michigan

Member of the Michigan House of Representatives from the 63rd district
- Incumbent
- Assumed office January 1, 2023
- Preceded by: Matt Hall (redistricted)

Personal details
- Born: May 30, 1970 (age 56) Mount Clemens, Michigan, U.S.
- Party: Republican
- Education: St. Clair County Community College (attended)

Jay DeBoyer (born May 30, 1970) is an American politician serving as a member of the Michigan House of Representatives since 2023, representing the 63rd district. A member of the Republican Party, DeBoyer previously served as the clerk of St. Clair County. He was the Republican nominee for lieutenant governor in the 2026 gubernatorial election, losing the election.

== Political career ==
He was first elected to the House in the 2022 election, and was reelected in 2024.

Before his election to the state House, DeBoyer was county clerk of St. Clair County. In the late 2024 internal Republican House caucus leadership election, which took place after Republicans won control of the House for the session beginning in 2025, DeBoyer joined the Republican leadership team as associate speaker pro tempore (under Matt Hall, who was chosen as speaker, and Rachelle Smit, who was chosen as speaker pro tempore).

On August 13, 2026, DeBoyer was selected by U.S. Representative John James to be his running mate for the 2026 gubernatorial election in Michigan. The two lost the election to Jocelyn Benson and Winnie Brinks.

== Electoral history ==
2022 Michigan House of Representatives election
| Party | Candidate | Votes | % |
|---|---|---|---|
| Republican | Jay DeBoyer | 28,050 | 64.3 |
| Democratic | Kelly Noland | 15,598 | 35.7 |
| Total votes | | 43,648 | 100 |
| Republican hold | | | |

2024 Michigan House of Representatives election
| Party | Candidate | Votes | % |
|---|---|---|---|
| Republican | Jay DeBoyer (incumbent) | 37,308 | 67.7 |
| Democratic | Robert Kelly-McFarland | 17,801 | 32.3 |
| Total votes | | 55,108 | 100 |
| Republican hold | | | |

2026 Michigan gubernatorial election
| Party | Candidate | Votes | % |
|---|---|---|---|
| Democratic | Jocelyn Benson; Winnie Brinks | | |
| Republican | John James; Jay DeBoyer | | |
| Libertarian | Anthony Hudson; Beau Parmenter | | |
| Green | Douglas Campbell; Bobbie Clay | | |
| U.S. Taxpayers Party of Michigan | Donna Brandenburg; Robert Donald Cowper II | | |
| Total votes | | | |

== See also ==
- Official website
- Campaign website

Party political offices
| Preceded by Shane Hernandez | Republican nominee for Lieutenant Governor of Michigan; 2026 | Most recent |
