= Jefferson H. Beckwith =

American politician

Member of the Michigan Senate from the 25th district
- In office January 3, 1855 – December 31, 1856
- Preceded by: Josiah Russell
- Succeeded by: William Canfield

Personal details
- Born: 1813 Ontario County, New York
- Died: 1865 (aged 51–52)
- Party: Republican

Jefferson H. Beckwith (1813 – 1865) was a Michigan politician.

== Early life and education ==
Beckwith was born in 1813 in Ontario County, New York. Beckwith studied law in Ellicottville, New York and was admitted to the bar in that state. In 1830, he settled near Ann Arbor, Michigan Territory. He then settled in East Plains, Michigan, which later became part of Lyons Township, Michigan.

== Career ==
Beckwith was a farmer. On November 8, 1854, Beckwith was elected to the Michigan Senate where he represented the 25th district from January 3, 1855 to December 31, 1856. During his term in the state senate, Beckwith served on the manufactures committee. Beckwith served as a postmaster in Michigan, and served a number of terms as supervisor of Lyons Township.

== Personal life ==
Beckwith never married.

== Death ==
Beckwith died in 1865.
