= Stephen Wooden =

American politician

Member of the Michigan House of Representatives from the 81st district
- Incumbent
- Assumed office January 1, 2025
- Preceded by: Rachel Hood

Personal details
- Born: Austin, Texas
- Party: Democratic
- Education: Michigan State University (BA)

Stephen Wooden is an American Democratic politician from Michigan. He was elected to the Michigan House of Representatives from the 81st district in the 2024 election.

Wooden was a Kent County Commissioner.

== Early life and education ==
Stephen Wooden was born in Austin, Texas, on August 6, 1991. His family lived in New York City when he was a young child. Experiencing the attacks on September 11, 2001 as a child in New York was a pivotal experience for him, one that he believes put him on a path towards public service.

His family moved to Grand Rapids, Michigan, in 2005. He graduated from Grand Rapids Catholic Central High School in 2009. He is an Eagle Scout from Troop 271 in East Grand Rapids.

Stephen graduated from Michigan State University's James Madison College in 2013 with a bachelor's degree in political theory and constitutional democracy.

== Career ==
Wooden began his career as a legislative aide in the Michigan House of Representatives. He left to work in the nonprofit sector. From 2017 to 2024, he worked for Dwelling Place of Grand Rapids, an affordable housing nonprofit.

In 2018, Wooden was elected to the Kent County Commission, unseating the Republican incumbent. He served on the Kent County Commission from 2019 to 2024. Between 2022 and 2024, he served as the minority vice-chair of the commission. There, he negotiated a $108 million spending plan for the county's share of federal funds from the American Rescue Plan. Wooden played a pivotal role in establishing the Kent County Affordable Housing Revolving Loan Fund.

Wooden was elected to the Michigan House of Representatives in 2024. He was appointed to the House Committee on Natural Resources and Tourism and the House Committee on Election Integrity, serving as the Democratic vice-chair of the latter.

== Electoral history ==
2024 Michigan's 81st House of Representatives district election
Party	Candidate	Votes	%
Democratic	Stephen Wooden	30,666	55.53%
Republican	Jordan Youngquist	24,375	44.14%
Total votes		55,041	100.0
Democratic hold			
