= John James (Michigan politician) =

American politician and businessman (born 1981)

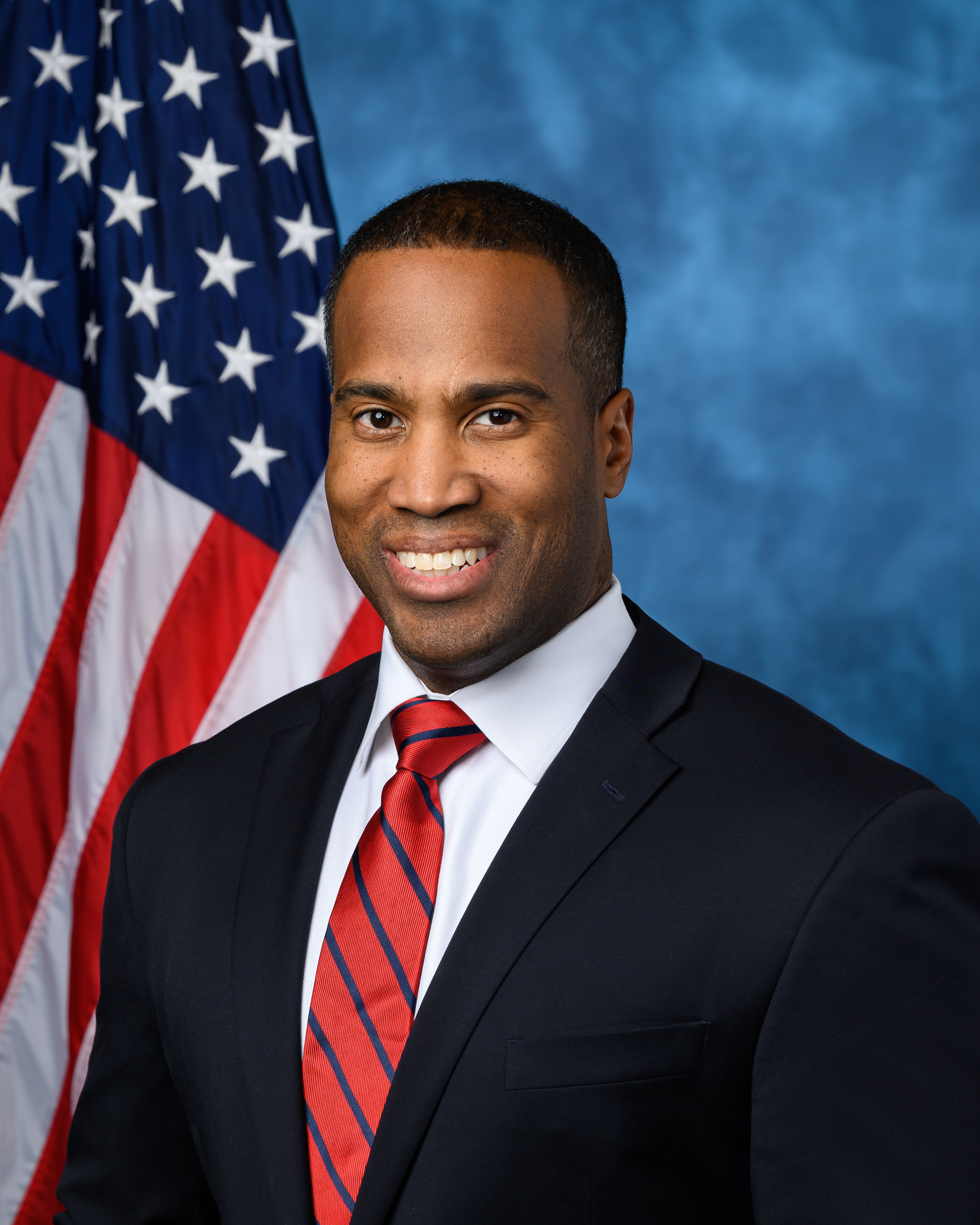
- Official portrait, 2023

Member of the U.S. House of Representatives from Michigan's 10th district
- Incumbent
- Assumed office January 3, 2023
- Preceded by: Lisa McClain (redistricted)

Personal details
- Born: John Edward James; June 8, 1981 (age 45) Southfield, Michigan, U.S.
- Party: Republican
- Spouse: Elizabeth James (m. 2012)
- Children: 3
- Education: United States Military Academy (BS); University of Michigan (MBA); Pennsylvania State University (MS)
- Website: House website Campaign website

Military service
- Branch: United States Army
- Service years: 2004–2012
- Rank: Captain
- Unit: Aviation Branch
- Conflict: Iraq War
- Awards: Ranger Tab

John Edward James (born June 8, 1981) is an American politician, businessman, and former military officer serving as the U.S. representative for Michigan's 10th congressional district since 2023. A member of the Republican Party, he was the party's nominee for the U.S. Senate in 2018 and 2020.

In 2022, James declared his candidacy in Michigan's redrawn 10th congressional district, a seat he won and was re-elected to in 2024.

James was the Republican nominee in the 2026 Michigan gubernatorial election, and was defeated by Secretary of State Jocelyn Benson in the general.

== Early life and military career ==
James was born in Southfield, Michigan, in 1981 and grew up Baptist in the Palmer Woods neighborhood of Detroit. He graduated from the Catholic Brother Rice High School in 1999. He graduated from the United States Military Academy (West Point) in 2004, and served eight years in the Army, participating in multiple tours of duty in Operation Iraqi Freedom as an AH-64 Apache pilot. Two of his West Point classmates are fellow congressmen Wesley Hunt and Pat Ryan. He attended Ranger School and became Ranger-tabbed as a captain.

James received a master's degree in supply chain management from Penn State University's Smeal College of Business and an MBA from the University of Michigan's Ross School of Business.

== Business career ==
In 2012, James joined James Group International, where his father, John A. James, was the CEO. James Group is a global supply chain management service company; James became its director of operations, and eventually became president of James Group International and CEO of its subsidiary, Renaissance Global Logistics. Renaissance Global, based in Detroit, was the recipient of a $1–2 million Paycheck Protection Program loan during the COVID-19 pandemic.

James was named one of Detroit Business Journal's 30 in their 30s of 2012, and Michigan Chronicle's 40 under 40 of 2014. He served as a board member of the Michigan Council for Future Mobility, Michigan Minority Supplier Development Council and National Veteran Business Development Council. He serves on the Detroit Workforce Development Board.

== Political career ==
=== 2018 U.S. Senate race ===
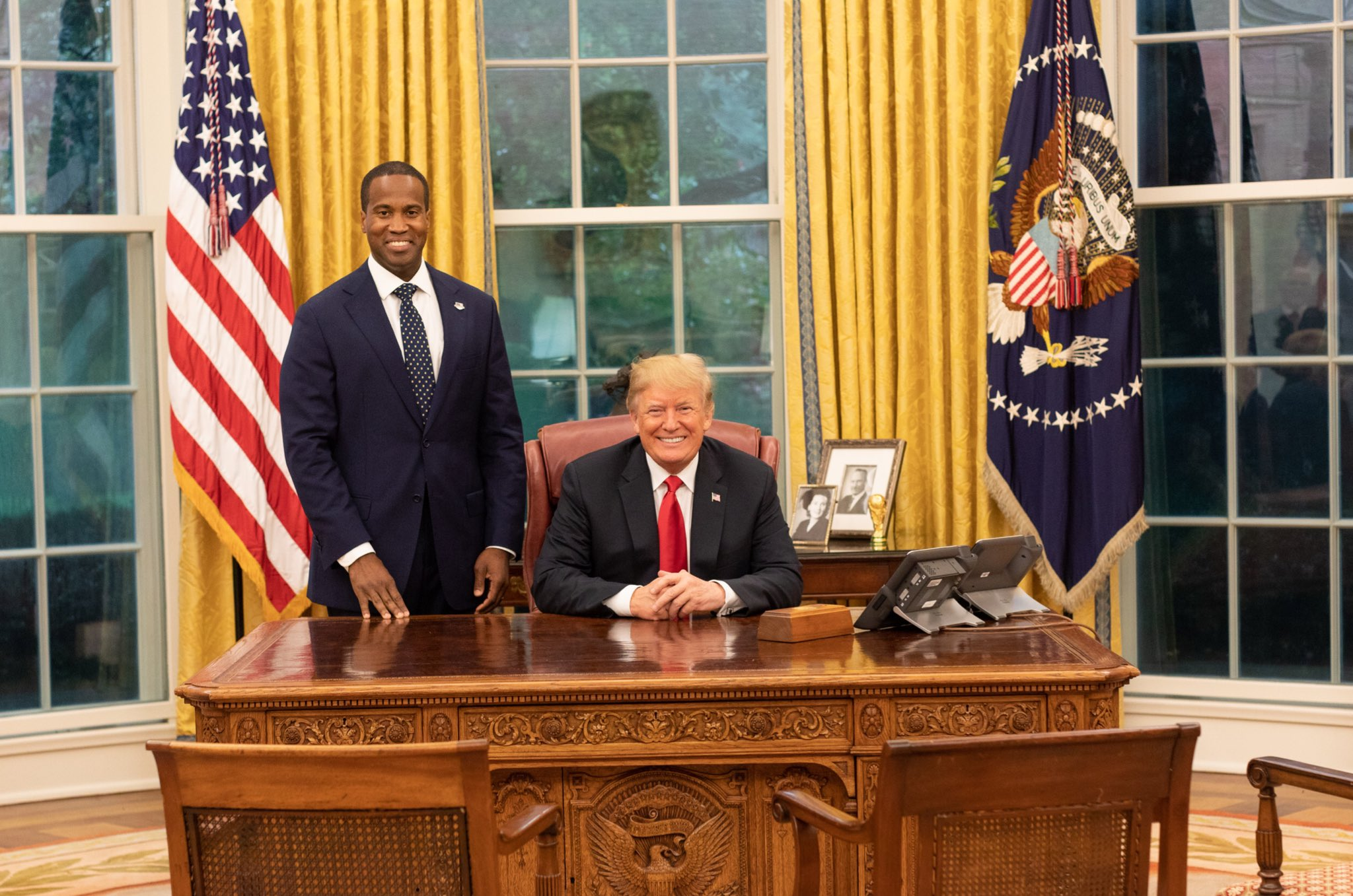
James with Donald Trump at the White House in September 2018

In September 2017, James entered the Republican primary for the 2018 United States Senate election in Michigan in an attempt to unseat three-term incumbent Democrat Debbie Stabenow, as well as become Michigan's first African-American senator. Despite musician and Michigan native Kid Rock publicly toying with the idea of running for the seat for months, the primary came down to James and Grosse Pointe businessman and former Wayne County commissioner Sandy Pensler. James was endorsed via Twitter by President Donald Trump on July 27, 2018, eleven days before the primary. James won the nomination with 55% of the vote.

On November 6, 2018, Stabenow defeated James, 52.3% to 45.8%.

=== Potential United Nations ambassadorship ===
In late November 2018, Bloomberg News reported that Trump was considering nominating James to become the United States Ambassador to the United Nations, to replace Ambassador Nikki Haley, who previously announced that she was planning to leave the Trump administration by the end of 2018. James reportedly met at the White House with Trump, Vice President Mike Pence, and Secretary of State Mike Pompeo. He was ultimately bypassed for the position. Trump announced he would appoint Heather Nauert, the spokesperson for the United States Department of State and a former television reporter, to succeed Haley, but Nauert was never nominated and announced in February 2019 that she was withdrawing from consideration.

After Nauert's withdrawal, Trump again considered James for the ambassadorship, but eventually nominated United States ambassador to Canada Kelly Knight Craft for the post.

=== 2020 U.S. Senate race ===
Because the election margin in the 2018 Senate race was narrower than expected, James became a front-runner for the Republican nomination to take on Michigan's other incumbent Democratic senator, Gary Peters, in the 2020 election.

As well as being recruited to take on Peters, it was reported in June 2019 that the National Republican Congressional Committee was recruiting James to challenge freshman Democratic U.S. representative Haley Stevens of Michigan's 11th congressional district.

On June 6, 2019, James announced that he was seeking the Republican nomination in 2020 to take on Peters. Michigan was one of two states in which an incumbent Democratic senator was seeking reelection during 2020 in a state won by Trump in 2016, the other being Alabama. Although the Associated Press called the race for Peters on November 4, 2020, James refused to concede, which Peters termed "pathetic." James initially insisted that the election had not been administered fairly. He established a joint legal fund with the Republican National Committee to challenge the results. James claimed there was "ample evidence" for an investigation, but offered none. He raised $2 million after the election as he sought to challenge the election results, and he unsuccessfully attempted to block certification of the results of the election, which he lost to Peters by 1.7% of the vote, which was much closer than originally projected. James conceded on November 24 over social media, congratulating Peters.

During his campaign, James pledged to give 5% of his campaign contributions to charity. The James fundraising committee reported about $46.12 million in total contributions for the 2020 election and has given more than $2.36 million to charities following through on his pledge.

== U.S. House of Representatives ==
=== Elections ===
==== 2022 ====
James won the Republican primary in the 2022 election in Michigan's 10th congressional district. He defeated Democrat Carl Marlinga in the November general election.

==== 2024 ====
James won a second term on November 5, 2024, in a rematch against Marlinga, winning 51.1% of the vote.

=== Committee assignments ===
As of the 118th Congress, James is a member of the following committees.

- Committee on Transportation and Infrastructure
  - Subcommittee on Water Resources and Environment (vice chair)
  - Subcommittee on Aviation
- Committee on Foreign Affairs
  - Subcommittee on Africa (Chairman)
  - Subcommittee for Western Hemisphere
- Committee on Education and the Workforce
  - Subcommittee on Higher Education and Workforce Development
- Committee on Energy and Commerce

== Political positions ==
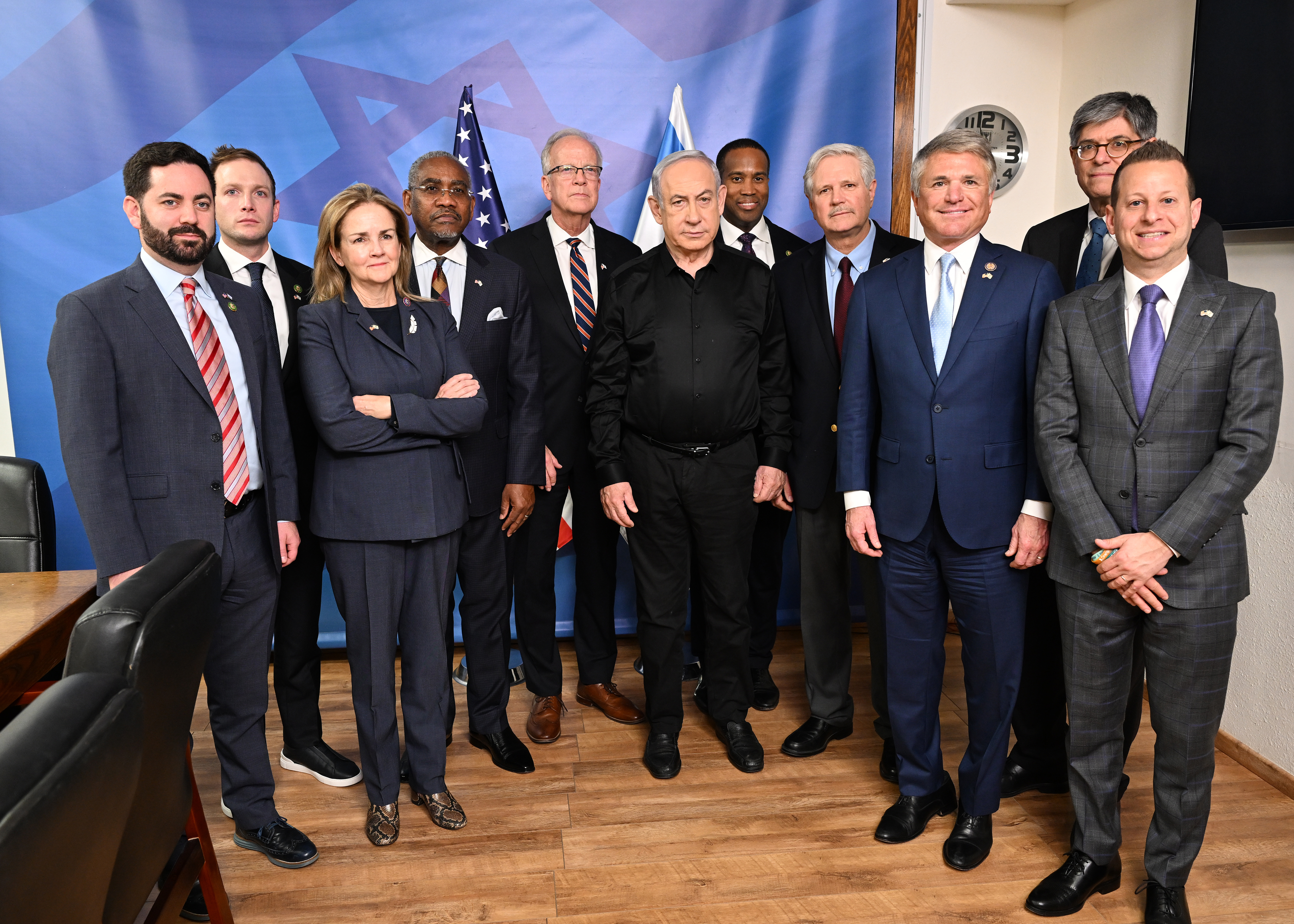
James and other members of the US Congress with Benjamin Netanyahu in Israel, November 12, 2023

During his 2018 Senate campaign, James ran on a typical Republican platform, describing himself on his campaign website as "a pro-life, pro-second amendment, pro-business conservative." He emphasized his desire to defund Planned Parenthood and compared Roe v. Wade, the United States Supreme Court decision legalizing abortion, to "genocide." He opposes the death penalty, does not believe employers should be able to fire workers due to their sexual orientation, and opposes the legalization of recreational marijuana.

James says he wants to repeal and replace the Affordable Care Act (Obamacare), which he has called "a monstrosity." According to The Detroit Free Press, James was careful not to take a position on the Trump administration's lawsuit seeking to immediately strike down the entire ACA as unconstitutional. When pressed in a September 2020 interview, he said he was against the ACA lawsuit without a replacement plan in place, but did not criticize Republicans for pushing the lawsuit.

James supported Ted Cruz in the 2016 Republican Party presidential primaries. He later became a Trump supporter, and tweeted in 2018 that, if elected to the Senate, he would back Trump "2,000%." During his 2020 campaign, James accepted Trump's endorsement and campaigned alongside him. James has not been publicly critical of Trump or his actions. During a meeting with black faith leaders, James was asked whether he disagreed with Trump on anything. James said, "Everything from cutting Great Lakes funding to 'shithole countries' to speaking ill of the dead. I mean, where do you want to start?" In a leaked audio recording of a meeting with African American leaders in Michigan, James was asked why he hadn't publicly criticized Trump. He said he thought it was better to be silent in public in order to gain access to Trump. James said, "Donald Trump doesn't need less Black folks around him, he needs more," and that his goal was "achieving equity and equality for our people, not standing up on Twitter and condemning folks." During the campaign, Democrats sought to tie James to Trump, while James has said his candidacy was not a referendum on Trump.

During his 2020 campaign, James declined to take specific positions on a number of policy questions, including how the Social Security Trust Fund would be protected from the impact of a payroll tax cut, whether the Senate should vote to confirm a new Supreme Court justice to fill the vacancy created by the death of Ruth Bader Ginsburg before or after the 2020 presidential election, and whether he thinks military bases named for Confederate generals should be renamed.

In July 2026, James jointly penned a letter to Prime Minister Mark Carney demanding immediate action from the Canadian government regarding wildfire smoke originating from wildfires burning nearby in Canada. This letter included the passage "Sovereignty comes with responsibility, and the responsibility to prevent a foreseeable disaster from crossing into another country's airspace has not been met".

During a July 2026 Newsmax interview about Islamic extremism, James said "I didn't go and fight extremists to have them on our doorstep here. Under no circumstances will we be a home in Michigan for extremism." The Council on American-Islamic Relations (CAIR) accused James of Islamophobia and James said he would seek to designate CAIR as a terrorist organization. James said "Whether you are Christian, Jewish, Muslim or Hindu, I will fiercely defend your religious freedom and every Michigan resident's right to worship peacefully — or not worship at all."

== 2026 gubernatorial campaign ==
On April 7, 2025, James announced his candidacy for governor of Michigan in the 2026 election. James won the primary and faced Democratic nominee Jocelyn Benson in the general election. He later lost to Benson.

James would have become Michigan's first African-American governor had he won.

== Personal life ==
James married his wife, Elizabeth, in 2012. They have three sons. When James was still dating Elizabeth, he had an encounter with police at a mall in a suburb of Detroit in which the officers drew their guns on him; James believes that if Elizabeth had not been beside him, he might have been killed. He has also expressed his fear of being killed whenever police pull him over for a traffic stop.

James is a nondenominational Christian. He lives in Shelby Township, Michigan.

== Electoral history ==
2018 United States Senate election in Michigan (Republican primary)
Party	Candidate	Votes	%
Republican	John James	518,564	54.7
Republican	Sandy Pensler	429,885	45.3
Write-in		57	<0.1%
Total votes		948,506	100.0%

2018 United States Senate election in Michigan
Party	Candidate	Votes	%	±%
Democratic	Debbie Stabenow (incumbent)	2,214,478	52.26	−6.54%
Republican	John James	1,938,818	45.76	+7.78%
Green	Marcia Squier	40,204	0.95	+0.35
U.S. Taxpayers'	George Huffman III	27,251	0.64	+0.08
Natural Law	John Howard Wilhelm	16,502	0.39	+0.15
Write-in	Total write-in	18	0.00043	−0.0014
Majority		275,660	6.5%	−14.32
Turnout		4,237,231	100.0%	−8.9
Democratic hold				

2020 United States Senate election in Michigan (Republican primary)
Party	Candidate	Votes	%
Republican	John James	1,005,315	100.0%
Total votes		1,005,315	100.0%

2020 United States Senate election in Michigan
Party	Candidate	Votes	%	±%
Democratic	Gary Peters (incumbent)	2,734,568	49.90%	−4.71%
Republican	John James	2,642,233	48.22%	+6.89%
U.S. Taxpayers'	Valerie Willis	50,597	0.92%	−0.28%
Green	Marcia Squier	39,217	0.72%	−0.12%
Natural Law	Doug Dern	13,093	0.24%	N/A
Write-in		12	0.00%	±0.00%
Total votes		5,479,720	100.0%	
Democratic hold				

2022 Michigan 10th congressional district election (Republican primary)
Party	Candidate	Votes	%
Republican	John James	63,417	86.3
Republican	Tony Marcinkewciz	10,079	13.7
Total votes		73,496	100.0

2022 Michigan 10th congressional district election
Party	Candidate	Votes	%
Republican	John James	159,202	48.80
Democratic	Carl Marlinga	157,602	48.31
Working Class	Andrea Kirby	5,905	1.81
Libertarian	Mike Saliba	3,524	1.08
Write-in		4	0.00
Total votes		326,237	100.0
Republican gain from Democratic			

2024 Michigan 10th congressional district election (Republican primary)
Party	Candidate	Votes	%
Republican	John James (incumbent)	52,871	100.0
Total votes		52,871	100.0

2024 Michigan 10th congressional district election
Party	Candidate	Votes	%
Republican	John James (incumbent)	217,437	51.13
Democratic	Carl Marlinga	191,363	44.99
Working Class	Andrea L. Kirby	11,162	2.62
Libertarian	Mike Saliba	5,339	1.26
Total votes		425,301	100.00
Republican hold			

2026 Michigan gubernatorial election (Republican primary)
Party	Candidate	Votes	%
Republican	John James	465,926	50.1
Republican	Perry Johnson	327,705	35.2
Republican	Mike Cox (withdrawn)	120,939	13.0
Republican	Aric Nesbitt (withdrawn)	16,320	1.8
Total votes		930,890	100.00

2026 Michigan gubernatorial election
Party	Candidate	Votes	%
Democratic	Jocelyn Benson; Winnie Brinks		
Republican	John James; Jay DeBoyer		
Libertarian	Anthony Hudson; Beau Parmenter		
Green	Douglas Campbell; Bobbie Clay		
U.S. Taxpayers Party of Michigan	Donna Brandenburg; Robert Donald Cowper II		
Total votes			

== See also ==
- List of African-American United States representatives
- List of African-American United States Senate candidates

Party political offices
Preceded by Pete Hoekstra	Republican nominee for U.S. Senator from Michigan (Class 1); 2018	Succeeded by Mike Rogers
Preceded by Terri Lynn Land	Republican nominee for U.S. Senator from Michigan (Class 2); 2020	Succeeded by Mike Rogers
Preceded by Tudor Dixon	Republican nominee for Governor of Michigan; 2026	Most recent
U.S. House of Representatives
Preceded by Lisa McClain	Member of the U.S. House of Representatives from Michigan's 10th congressional district 2023–present	Incumbent
U.S. order of precedence (ceremonial)
Preceded by Jonathan Jackson	United States representatives by seniority 319th	Succeeded by Sydney Kamlager-Dove
