= Michigan's 81st House of Representatives district =

American legislative district

Michigan's 81st State House of Representatives district
Representative
Stephen Wooden; D–Grand Rapids
- Demographics: 76.9% White; 7.1% Black; 6.3% Hispanic; 3.4% Asian; 0.3% Native American; 0.1% Hawaiian/Pacific Islander; 0.6% Other; 5.4% Multiracial
- Population (2024): 92,013

Michigan's 81st House of Representatives district (also referred to as Michigan's 81st House district) is a legislative district within the Michigan House of Representatives located in part of Kent County. The district was created in 1965, when the Michigan House of Representatives district naming scheme changed from a county-based system to a numerical one.

== List of representatives ==
Representative	Party	Dates	Residence	Notes
Dale Kildee	Democratic	1965–1974	Flint	
Mark Clodfelter	Democratic	1975–1980	Flint	Resigned.
Robert L. Emerson	Democratic	1981–1992	Flint	
Terry London	Republican	1993–1998	Marysville	
Lauren M. Hager	Republican	1999–2004	Port Huron	
Phil Pavlov	Republican	2005–2010	St. Clair Township	
Judson Gilbert II	Republican	2011–2012	Algonac	
Dan Lauwers	Republican	2013–2018	Brockway	
Gary Eisen	Republican	2019–2022	St. Clair Township	
Rachel Hood	Democratic	2023–2025	Grand Rapids	
Stephen Wooden	Democratic	2025–present	Grand Rapids	

== Recent elections ==
=== 2020s ===
2026 Michigan House of Representatives election
Party	Candidate	Votes	%
Democratic	Stephen Wooden (incumbent)	29,845	60.98
Republican	Holly DeBoer	19,101	39.02
Total votes		48,946	100
Democratic hold			

2020 Michigan House of Representatives election
Party	Candidate	Votes	%
Republican	Gary Eisen	33,241	68.49
Democratic	Debbie Bourgois	15,290	31.51
Total votes		48,531	100.0

2018 Michigan House of Representatives election
Party	Candidate	Votes	%
Republican	Gary R. Eisen	22,811	63.47
Democratic	Joshua Rivard	13,130	36.53
Total votes		35,941	100
Republican hold			

2016 Michigan House of Representatives election
Party	Candidate	Votes	%
Republican	Dan Lauwers	28,068	68.96%
Democratic	Stewart Sternberg	12,633	31.04%
Total votes		40,701	100.00%
Republican hold			

2014 Michigan House of Representatives election
Party	Candidate	Votes	%
Republican	Daniel Lauwers	17,882	65.08
Democratic	Bernardo Licata	9,596	34.92
Total votes		27,478	100.0
Republican hold			

2012 Michigan House of Representatives election
Party	Candidate	Votes	%
Republican	Daniel Lauwers	20,929	53.84
Democratic	Patrick Phelan	17,945	46.16
Total votes		38,874	100.0
Republican hold			

2010 Michigan House of Representatives election
Party	Candidate	Votes	%
Republican	Jud Gilbert	19,620	69.91
Democratic	Carol Morrissette	8,444	30.09
Independent	Gary R. Eisen	3,793	11.76
Total votes		32,265	100.0
Republican hold			

2008 Michigan House of Representatives election
Party	Candidate	Votes	%
Republican	Phil Pavlov	30,125	64.26
Democratic	Brent Pencak	16,757	35.74
Total votes		46,882	100.0
Republican hold			

== Historical district boundaries ==
Map	Description	Apportionment Plan	Notes
	Genesee County (part): Flint (part)	1964 Apportionment Plan	
	Genesee County (part): Flint (part)	1972 Apportionment Plan	
	Genesee County (part): Flint (part); Flint Township (part)	1982 Apportionment Plan	
	St. Clair County (part): Burtchville Township; China Township; Clyde Township; East China Township; Fort Gratiot Township; Kimball Township; Marysville; Port Huron; Port Huron Township; St. Clair; St. Clair Township	1992 Apportionment Plan	
	St. Clair County (part): Algonac; Berlin Township; Brockway Township; Casco Township; China Township; Clay Township; Clyde Township; Cottrellville Township; East China Township; Emmett Township; Grant Township; Greenwood Township; Kenockee Township; Lynn Township; Marine City; Marysville; Memphis (part); Mussey Township; Port Huron Township; Richmond (part); Riley Township; St. Clair; St. Clair Township; Yale	2001 Apportionment Plan	
	St. Clair County (part): Algonac; Berlin Township; Brockway Township; China Township; Clay Township; Clyde Township; Cottrellville Township; East China Township; Emmett Township; Grant Township; Greenwood Township; Lynn Township; Marine City; Marysville; Mussey Township; Port Huron Township; St. Clair; St. Clair Township; Yale	2011 Apportionment Plan	
