= National Register of Historic Places listings in St. Clair County, Michigan =

Location of St. Clair County in Michigan

The following is a list of National Register of Historic Places listings in St. Clair County, Michigan.

There are 24 listings on the National Register of Historic Places in St. Clair County in the U.S. state of Michigan. These include 21 individual properties, two National Historic Landmarks (the Huron and St. Clair Tunnel), and one historic district (Military Road). Two of the properties listed have since been demolished (Vernier Street–Swan Creek Bridge and Wadhams Road–Pine River Bridge), although both of these bridges remain listed on the National Register of Historic Places.

There is also one formerly listed property, the USCGC Bramble, which was originally listed in 2012 but delisted in 2023 after the ship was scrapped. Another property, the Indian Trail Road–Belle River Bridge, remains listed, even though the bridge itself was replaced and later moved to Indiana in 2015. Ten of the 24 listings are also dually designated as Michigan State Historic Sites, and the city of Port Huron contains the most total listings with 12.

This National Park Service list is complete through NPS recent listings posted October 30, 2026.

	Name on the Register	Image	Date listed	Location	City or town	Description
1	Colony Tower Complex	Colony Tower Complex	July 22, 1994 (#94000756)	6503 Dyke Road; Clay Township; 42°37′56″N 82°36′57″W	Clay Township	Built in 1926, the water tower marks the entrance of a planned affluent community in Pearl Beach. The Great Depression halted these original plans, although it did develop many years later. The neighboring gate house was later included as part of the historic designation on July 21, 1995 (95000876).
2	Federal Building	Federal Building	August 7, 1974 (#74002047)	526 Water Street; 42°58′29″N 82°25′34″W	Port Huron	Competed by 1877, this Renaissance Revival building served as a courthouse, as well as holding the post office and federal government offices. An addition was added and completed by 1933. It continues to hold government offices and is the oldest building in the state still occupied by the federal government.
3	Fort Gratiot	Fort Gratiot	April 14, 1980 (#80004069)	Thomas Edison Parkway along the St. Clair River; 42°59′42″N 82°25′41″W	Port Huron	A former American stockade fort along the St. Clair River, it was first established in 1814. The fort was occupied until 1879 and completely shut down by 1895. The Fort Gratiot Hospital building is one of the only remaining structures, and it was moved near Fort Gratiot Light by 2002.
4	Fort Gratiot Lighthouse	Fort Gratiot Lighthouse	July 30, 1976 (#76001975)	Omar and Garfield Street; 43°00′23″N 82°25′21″W	Port Huron	This lighthouse at the entrance of the St. Clair River at Lake Huron was first constructed in 1825 and rebuilt in 1829. It is the oldest continuously operating lighthouse in the state. A keeper's house was added to the site in 1874, and a U.S. Coast Guard facility was built in 1932. It became automated in 1933.
5	Grand Trunk Western Railroad Depot	Grand Trunk Western Railroad Depot	April 13, 1977 (#77001397)	510 Thomas Edison Parkway; 42°59′55″N 82°25′34″W	Port Huron	The train depot was constructed in 1858 and served as a major port for immigrants from Canada. A young Thomas Edison worked here on the railroad as a news butcher from 1859 to 1863. A larger depot was built in 1907, and the original depot was turned into office space. In 2001, it was converted into the Thomas Edison Depot Museum.
6	Harrington Hotel	Harrington Hotel	April 22, 1982 (#82004468)	1026 Military Street; 42°58′22″N 82°25′28″W	Port Huron	This five-story hotel was built in 1896. It became a very sociable venue and hosted many famous guests, including Harry S. Truman and his wife Bess, who had their honeymoon here in 1919. The hotel would later suffer from financial difficulties, and it was converted into an assisted living facility in the 1980s. It closed in 2017 and remains shuttered.
7	Howard Block	Howard Block	March 17, 1994 (#94000251)	201–205 Huron Avenue; 42°58′35″N 82°25′29″W	Port Huron	This three-story Italianate brick building was built by local businessman and politician Henry Howard in 1875 in the center of downtown Port Huron. The building was once occupied by several prominent banks and continues to house some small commercial businesses.
8	Huron (lightship)	Huron (lightship)	July 12, 1976 (#76001974)	Pine Grove Park on the St. Clair River; 42°59′21″N 82°25′36″W	Port Huron	This lightship vessel was put into service in 1920. By 1940, Huron was the last lightship activated on the Great Lakes, and it remained in service until 1970. It was donated to the city of Port Huron in 1971 and currently operates as a museum ship, in which it is permanently docked near Pine Grove Park.
9	James McColl House	James McColl House	January 31, 1985 (#85000170)	205 South Main Street; 43°07′36″N 82°47′55″W	Yale	This Queen Anne house was constructed in 1899 for local businessman and first Yale village president James McColl. The home remained in the McColl family until 1980. The house passed through several owners and was later remodeled and restored in 2019.
10	Jeddo Road–South Branch Mill Creek Drain Bridge	Jeddo Road–South Branch Mill Creek Drain Bridge	January 28, 2000 (#00000013)	Jeddo Road over South Branch Mill Creek Drain; 43°08′36″N 82°50′13″W	Brockway Township	This steel bridge was first constructed in 1939 by the county commission to replace a smaller inefficient bridge at the site. The rural bridge is 29 feet (8.8 m) long and a maximum of 23 feet (7.0 m) wide. By 2016, the bridge had deteriorated and was closed to traffic for several years for repairs.
11	Ladies of the Maccabees Building	Ladies of the Maccabees Building	April 22, 1982 (#82004469)	901 Huron Avenue; 42°59′00″N 82°25′29″W	Port Huron	This Classic Revival building was constructed in 1904 and served as the headquarters for the Ladies of the Maccabees until 1928. It then became an educational building and housed the Port Huron Junior College and other administrative offices until 1981. It now serves as an attorney office building.
12	LeRoy Smith House	LeRoy Smith House	April 4, 1996 (#96000365)	9503 Frank Street; 42°38′31″N 82°30′50″W	Clay Township	Built along the St. Clair River in 1940, this modern movement house was designed by Alden B. Dow. The house was built for businessman LeRoy Smith and completed in 1942. The house remains under private ownership.
13	Marine City City Hall	Marine City City Hall	January 11, 1982 (#82004466)	300 Broadway Street; 42°43′10″N 82°29′35″W	Marine City	Constructed as a new city hall for Marine City, it was designed by George Mason and others and completed in 1885. It received an addition in 1910 and housed the city government until 2005 when a new city hall was built. The original city hall was later restored and renovated.
14	Marine City Water Works	Marine City Water Works	September 15, 2011 (#11000667)	Waterworks Park; 229 South Water Street; 42°43′03″N 82°29′36″W	Marine City	The original water station in Marine City dated back to 1885 and was deemed significantly inadequate in providing the city with clean water. Budget constraints delayed building a new station until a Public Works Administration grant helped fund it, which was completed in 1936.
15	Masters Road–Belle River Bridge	Masters Road–Belle River Bridge	January 27, 2000 (#99001728)	Masters Road over the Belle River; 42°56′24″N 82°49′50″W	Riley Township	Built in 1935 from federal funding, it was constructed with the intent to better serve local residents. This steel bridge along Masters Road is 55 feet (17 m) long and 24 feet (7.3 m) wide and spans the Belle River in rural Riley Township.
16	Military Road Historic District	Military Road Historic District	August 14, 1998 (#98001059)	Military Street and Huron Avenue from Court to Bard Street; 42°58′34″N 82°25′31″W	Port Huron	This mixed-architecture commercial district is centered along Military Street and the Black River in downtown Port Huron. The oldest structures within the district date back to the early 1870s, including the Howard Block. The district contains 74 properties and encompasses around 40 acres (16 ha).
17	St. Clair Flats South Channel Range Lights	St. Clair Flats South Channel Range Lights	May 24, 1990 (#90000853)	0.6 mi (0.97 km) west of the southern tip of Harsens Island; 42°32′15″N 82°41′41″W	Clay Township	Consisting of two lighthouse structures at the mouth of the St. Clair River at Lake St. Clair, they were activated in 1859 after the area became very problematic for shipping. Suffering from erosion, the structures underwent numerous repairs before ultimately being deactivated in 1935. The keeper's house was also demolished around that time.
18	St. Clair Inn	St. Clair Inn	July 3, 1995 (#95000074)	500 North Riverside Avenue; 42°49′40″N 82°29′04″W	St. Clair	This 60-room Tudor Revival hotel was built along the St. Clair River in 1926 to cater to river travelers. Over the years, it changed ownership numerous times and received an addition in 1978. It was renovated in the 2010s and continues to operate as a hotel under the ownership of Marriott.
19	St. Clair River Tunnel	St. Clair River Tunnel	October 15, 1970 (#70000684)	St. Clair River between Port Huron and Sarnia, Ontario; 42°57′30″N 82°24′38″W	Port Huron	Completed in 1891, it was the first underwater railroad tunnel in North America and is considered an engineering landmark. At over 6,000 feet (1,800 m) long, it crosses the international border from Michigan to Ontario. The original tunnel was closed and replaced by a second tunnel in 1994.
20	Seventh Street–Black River Bridge	Seventh Street–Black River Bridge	February 4, 2000 (#00000045)	Seventh Street over the Black River; 42°58′34″N 82°25′39″W	Port Huron	Completed in 1932 across the Black River, this bascule bridge replaced an inadequate bridge from 1875. Designed by J. A. L. Waddell, the new 114-foot (35 m) long bridge allowed for vehicle traffic and to aid in larger ships navigating the river.
21	Vernier Street–Swan Creek Bridge	Vernier Street–Swan Creek Bridge	January 28, 2000 (#00000011)	Vernier Street over Swan Creek; 42°40′50″N 82°39′29″W	Ira Township	This 45-foot (14 m) long concrete bridge was built in 1922 to replace a previously ineffecient bridge. It carried a 22-foot (6.7 m) wide roadway that was part of an early state highway but later turned over to local control. The bridge fell into disrepair and was demolished in 2014, and it was not replaced.
22	Wadhams Road–Pine River Bridge	Wadhams Road–Pine River Bridge	January 28, 2000 (#00000014)	Wadhams Road over the Pine River; 42°52′17″N 82°33′28″W	St. Clair Township	Completed in 1928 in rural St. Clair Township, it was a 150-foot (46 m) long concrete camelback bridge that carried Wadhams Road across the Pine River. Deteriorating over time, the bridge was demolished and replaced entirely in 2007.
23	Ward–Holland House	Ward–Holland House	January 13, 1972 (#72001305)	433 North Main Street; 42°43′26″N 82°29′22″W	Marine City	This Greek Revival house in Marine City was constructed in 1830 and is one of the oldest remaining homes in the state. Built for river captain Samuel Ward, the estate was sold after he died in 1876. The Holland family owned the home until 1994, and it remains a private residence.
24	Wilbur F. Davidson House	Wilbur F. Davidson House	October 5, 1972 (#72001306)	1707 Military Street; 42°57′59″N 82°25′30″W	Port Huron	Completed in 1890, this Queen Anne home belonged to businessman Wilbur Davidson, who was the first to bring electricity to the county when he installed an electric light plant in his general store in 1883. His family owned the home until selling it in 1950, and it remains a private residence.

== Former listings ==
	Name on the Register	Image	Date listed	Date removed	Location	Description
1	USCGC Bramble	USCGC Bramble	August 1, 2012 (#12000457)	December 2, 2024	Former: 2336 Military Street; Port Huron; 42°57′36″N 82°25′32″W	This seagoing buoy tender was launched in 1943 by the U.S. Coast Guard. The ship traveled throughout the world, including at Bikini Atoll and the Northwest Passage. It was decommissioned in 2003 and permanently docked as a museum ship in Port Huron. Due to budget constraints, it was sold to a private owner in 2018 and ultimately scrapped in 2023.

== Listings formerly located in St. Clair County ==
The following listing was located in St. Clair County at the time it was placed on the National Register, but it has since been moved to another location outside of the county.

	Name on the Register	Image	Date listed	Current location	Location when listed	Description
1	Indian Trail Road–Belle River Bridge	Indian Trail Road–Belle River Bridge	January 28, 2000 (#00000012)	S-BRITE Center; 2273 Aviation Drive; West Lafayette, Indiana; 40°24′31″N 86°57′02″W	Indian Trail Road over Belle River in China Township; 42°46′30″N 82°32′58″W	In 1937, a Public Works Administration grant allowed for the construction of this 91-foot (28 m) long truss bridge across the Belle River in China Township. In 2008, the bridge was replaced. The original bridge was eventually moved to a Purdue University research center in Indiana.

== See also ==
- List of Michigan State Historic Sites in St. Clair County, Michigan
- List of National Historic Landmarks in Michigan
- National Register of Historic Places listings in Michigan
- Listings in neighboring counties: Lapeer, Macomb, Sanilac
