= List of Michigan State Historic Sites in St. Clair County =

Location of St. Clair County in Michigan

The following lists Michigan State Historic Sites in St. Clair County, Michigan, United States. Sites marked with a dagger (†) are also listed on the National Register of Historic Places in St. Clair County, Michigan. Those with a double dagger (‡) are also designated National Historic Landmarks.

== Current listings ==
Name	Image	Location	City	Listing date
Algonac City Hall (Demolished)		1410 St. Clair River Drive	Algonac	February 7, 1977
Almont New Church (Swedenborgian)		Northeast corner of Cameron and Tubspring roads	Allenton vicinity	March 28, 1985
Clay Township Library / Dr. Walter Bostwick House		1240 St. Clair River Drive	Algonac	August 3, 1979
Cole Class - West Brockway Methodist Church Informational Designation		7015 Carson Road, NE corner of Wilkes Road	Yale vicinity	June 30, 1988
Colony Tower†		6503 Dyke Road	Clay Township	April 21, 1980
Congregational Church		300 Adams St	St. Clair	August 3, 1979
David and Laura Lester House		406 S. Main Street	Marine City	2008
James A. Davidson House		1229 Seventh Street	Port Huron	September 21, 1983
Wilbur F. Davidson House†		1707 Military Street	Port Huron	May 17, 1973
East China Fractional District No. 2 School		696 Meisner Road	East China Township	July 18, 1991
Tom Edison at Grand Trunk Informational Designation (site of the Grand Trunk Western Railroad Depot†)		Thomas Edison Depot Museum, 510 Edison Parkway	Port Huron	September 2, 1966
First Baptist Church (Demolished)		Erie Square	Port Huron	August 13, 1971
First Baptist Church		308 South Fourth Street	St. Clair	September 26, 1987
Fort Gratiot†		520 State Street	Port Huron	February 18, 1956
Fort Gratiot Lighthouse†		Omar and Garfield streets	Port Huron	April 23, 1971
Fort Sinclair (20SC58)		South of the mouth of the Pine River on the St. Clair River	St. Clair	February 17, 1965
Fort St. Joseph		Gratiot Park on M-25 (Gratiot Avenue) and Forest Street, under the Bluewater Bridge	Port Huron	August 23, 1956
Grace Episcopal Church		1213 Sixth Street	Port Huron	April 18, 1991
Gratiot Park United Methodist Church		2503 Cherry Street	Port Huron	March 10, 1988
Graziadei-Casello Building		307 Huron Avenue	Port Huron	November 16, 1995
Greenwood Cemetery		444 Pleasant Street	Marine City	1996
Harrington Hotel†		1026 Military Street	Port Huron	November 16, 1981
Harsen House		2006 Golf Course Road	Harsens Island	February 7, 1977
Holy Cross Parish		618 South Water Street, SE corner of Bridge Street	Marine City	August 12, 1977
Immaculate Conception of Blessed Virgin Mary		9764 Dixie Hwy	Ira Township	2018
Jefferson Sheldon House		807 Prospect Place	Port Huron	April 19, 1990
Lake Huron Water Supply Project / Tunnel Explosion		Fort Gratiot County Park; 3325 Metcalf Road	Fort Gratiot Township	2011
Clay Township Library / Dr. Walter Bostwick House		1240 St. Clair River Drive	Algonac	August 3, 1979
Lightship No. 103‡		Pine Grove Park	Port Huron	May 17, 1973
Marine City Informational Designation / Marine City City Hall†		300 Broadway Street	Marine City	August 6, 1976
James McColl House†		205 South Main Street	Yale	January 8, 1981
George H. McIntyre House		4207 South River Road	St. Clair	September 29, 1972
Newport Academy		405 South Main Street	Marine City	June 15, 1979
North Channel Shooting Club		1001 North Channel, on the St. Clair River	Clay Township	January 21, 1988
Port Huron High School		323 Erie Street	Port Huron	December 15, 1988
The Port Huron Settlement		Lakeshore Road (M-25); Lakeport State Park	Burtchville Township	2024
Ruby Methodist Church		6650 Abbottsford Road, near Brott Road	Ruby	July 19, 1990
Sacred Heart Cemetery		Church Road, just north of Dixie Highway	Ira Township	2018
St. Andrew's Church / St. Andrew's Parish Informational Designation		1507 St. Clair River Drive	Algonac	January 16, 1990
Saint Clair Inn†		500 North Riverside Avenue	St. Clair	October 20, 1994
Saint Clair River Informational Designation		Algonac State Park, two miles north of Algonac	Clay Township	January 19, 1957
St. Clair River Tunnel‡		Between Johnstone & Beard, near 10th Street (portal site)	Port Huron	August 23, 1956
Saint Johannes Evangelische Kirche		710 Pine Street, at Seventh Street	Port Huron	March 19, 1980
Saint Mary's Catholic Church and Rectory		415 North Sixth Street, between Vine and Orchard streets	St. Clair	September 25, 1985
St. Mary's Cemetery		Church Road, just north of Dixie Highway; Across from Sacred Heart Cemetery	Ira Township	2017
Stewart Farm / Memoir of Aura Stewart		2007 Stewart Road	Harsens Island	2004
Trinity Evangelical Lutheran Church		1517 Tenth Street	Port Huron	August 29, 1996
Wales Township Hall		1372 Wales Center	Wales Township	July 18, 1996
Ward-Holland House†		433 North Main Street	Marine City	May 5, 1964
Water Speed Capital Commemorative Designation		Algonac City Park; 1309 St. Clair River Drive	Algonac	January 8, 1981
E. C. Williams House		2511 Tenth Avenue, between Hancock and Church streets	Port Huron	November 18, 1993
C. H. Wills & Company		Chrysler Plant, 840 Huron Avenue	Marysville	June 23, 1983
Woman's Benefit Association Building		1338 Military Street	Port Huron	December 15, 1988

== See also ==
- National Register of Historic Places listings in St. Clair County, Michigan

== Sources ==
- Historic Sites Online – "St. Clair" County. Michigan State Housing Developmental Authority. Accessed May 31, 2011.
- Historic Sites Online – "Saint Clair" County. Michigan State Housing Developmental Authority. Accessed May 31, 2011.
