= Military Road Historic District =

- U.S. National Register of Historic Places
- U.S. Historic district
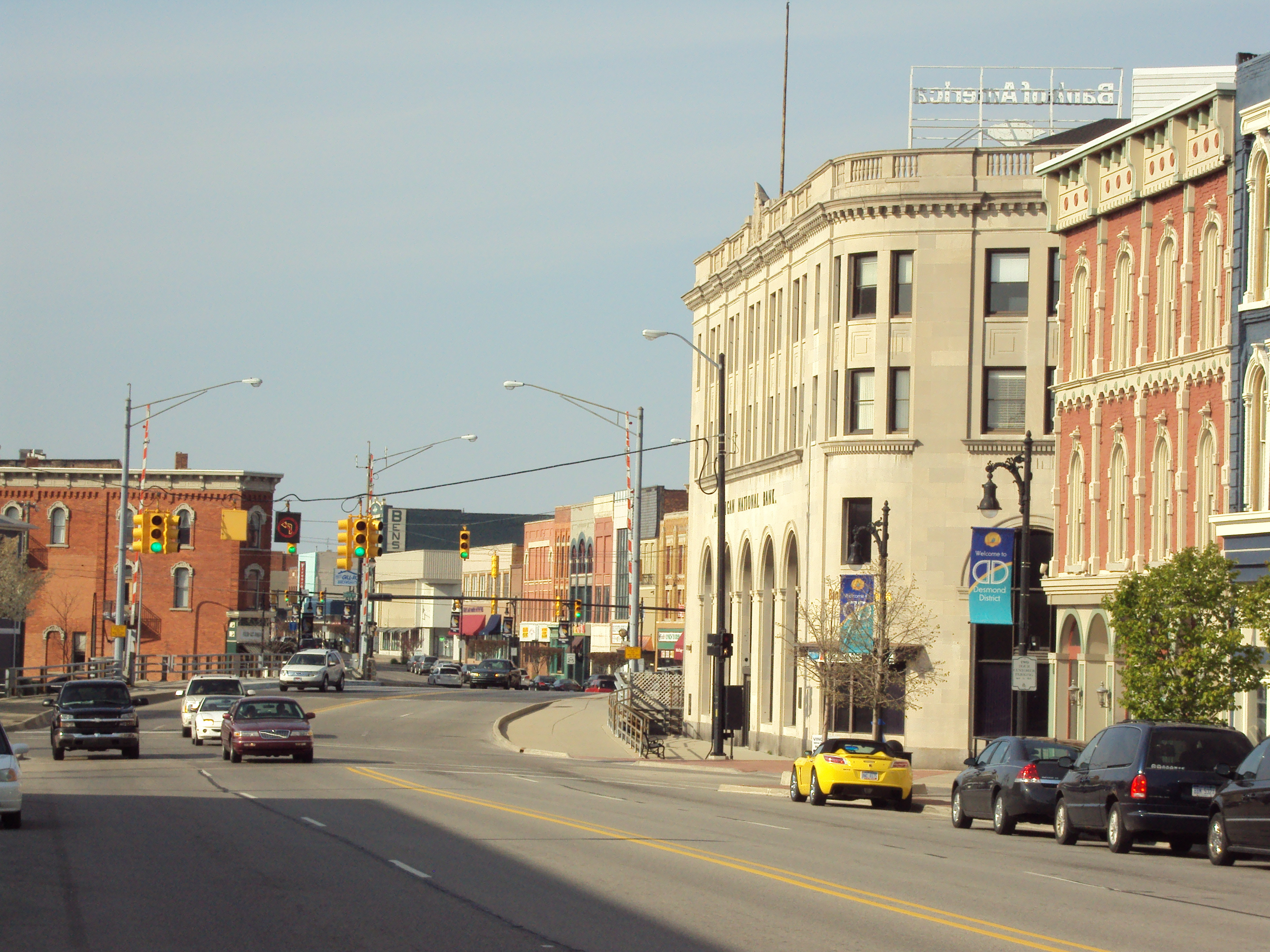

- Location within Michigan Location within the United States
- Interactive map
- Location: Military St. and Huron Ave., from Court St. to Bard St., Port Huron, Michigan
- Coordinates: 42°58′34″N 82°25′31″W
- Area: 40 acres (16 ha)
- Architect: R. Casler, C.M. Butterfield, et al
- Architectural style: Art Deco, Late 19th And 20th Century Revivals, Late Victorian
- NRHP reference No.: 98001059
- Added to NRHP: August 14, 1998

The Military Road Historic District is a commercial historic district located along Military Street and Huron Avenue, from Court Street to Bard Street, in Port Huron, Michigan. The district was listed on the National Register of Historic Places in 1998.

== History ==
The area around modern Port Huron was sparsely settled until 1814, when Fort Gratiot was constructed. Nearby land was platted and sold. In 1821, an inn was opened along what is now Quay Street, and in 1825, James Cook opened a store on the north bank of the Black River. A second store joined it in 1827, and by 1830 a small settlement was in place in and around the current district. Real development started in 1833, when the Black River Steam Saw Mill Company opened, and the Fort Gratiot Military Road was completed, connecting Fort Gratiot to Detroit. Along with the Military Road completion, the first bridge across the Black River was constructed.

The 1830s saw a quick jump in land prices around Port Huron, as well as a substantial influx of new residents. By 1840, Port Huron had over 1000 citizens. It was organized into a village in 1849, and into a city in 1857, and by 1864, over 4000 people lived in Port Huron, with the increase in economic development led primarily by the lumber trade. During this span, the first of the commercial buildings were constructed in the district. These buildings were typically simply constructed, wood frame buildings of one or two stories, many of which were replaced with more permanent brick structures as finances permitted. However, one of these early frame structures, dating from the 1840s or 1850s, still survives at 405 Quay Street.

By 1870, the lumber business went into a decline, but the rise of manufacturing and tourism in Port Huron led to a stable and diversified economy. Now was the time that merchants built more substantial brick buildings, many with architectural significance. Among the first of these was the 1864 Dowling Block, located at 106-108 Huron, which is the oldest known brick building in the city. By 1900, the population had risen to over 19,000 people, and a number of substantial buildings had been constructed throughout the downtown area.

In the twentieth century, the rise of the automobile changed both tourism and the commercial landscape. Some significant buildings were constructed in the Port Huron downtown, for example as a result of the St. Clair Hotel fire of 1903. In addition, several former stables were repurposed. Port Huron's commercial sector thrived at first, but after World War II, much of the new development began taking place outside of the downtown area. A particular exception was the 1959/60 McMorran Memorial Auditorium, designed by Alden Dow. Urban renewal in the 1970s caused a substantial section of the downtown to be razed and replaced with modern structures. Although this resulted in the loss of a sizable number of historic buildings, the renewal also made the waterfront more accessible, boosting tourism, and eliminated some of the excess building stock, making the remainder of the downtown more viable.

== Description ==
The Military Road Historic District consists of the bulk of the central business district of Port Huron, located along the historic military road that lead to Fort Gratiot. The district is centered on the Black River, and contains 74 buildings that contribute to the historic nature of the area, as well as 24 non-contributing buildings. The structures in the district are primarily commercial building, fronting on what is now Military Street (north of the river) and Huron Avenue (south of the river). A few surviving warehouse buildings, as well as a few social/religious buildings, are also included in the district.

Significant buildings in the district include:

- Dowling Block (106-108 Huron Avenue). The flatiron-shaped Dowling Block is the oldest structure in the downtown area, constructed at some point just before 1864. Although the storefront level has been heavily altered, the upper levels are very much intact, and feature equally spaced segmentally-arched window openings topped with brick hoods.
- Howard Block (201-205 Huron Avenue): The 1874 Howard Block, designed by Detroit architect Julius Hess, is separately listed on the National Register. It is located at the corner of Huron and Quay.
- Supreme Tent of the Knights of the Maccabees (525-27 Huron Avenue): The first Maccabees building constructed on this site was a two-story structure completed in 1893. The group soon outgrew it, and plans were drawn up to construct a larger building, incorporating the original 1893 structure. The current four-story structure was completed in 1900, and has a Moorish-themed exterior decoration.
- Henry McMorran Memorial Auditorium (701 McMorran Boulevard): The Henry McMorran Memorial Auditorium, located at the former site of the former city hall/county courthouse complex, was built in 1958-59 and designed by architect Alden Dow. It was donated to the city by the McMorran Foundation, which was established at the death of Henry McMorran.
- Harrington Hotel (1026 Military Street): The five-story Harrington Hotel opened in 1896 amid much fanfare. It is separately listed on the National Register.
- 405 Quay Street: This small false-front building is the only surviving frame structure in the area, and may likely be the oldest building in the district. The building currently serves as a bar on the ground floor with living quarters above.
- American Legion Post (1026 Sixth Street): This complex started as the elaborate Second Empire John Johnson home, but was drastically revamped, with multiple additions, to serve as the American Legion Post.
- Carnegie Center (1115 Sixth Street): This building was originally erected during 1903-04 as the Port Huron Public Library, using funds donated by Andrew Carnegie. It is a two-story Beaux-Arts building, and now serves as the Port Huron Museum of Arts and History.
