= Indian Trail Road–Belle River Bridge =

- U.S. National Register of Historic Places
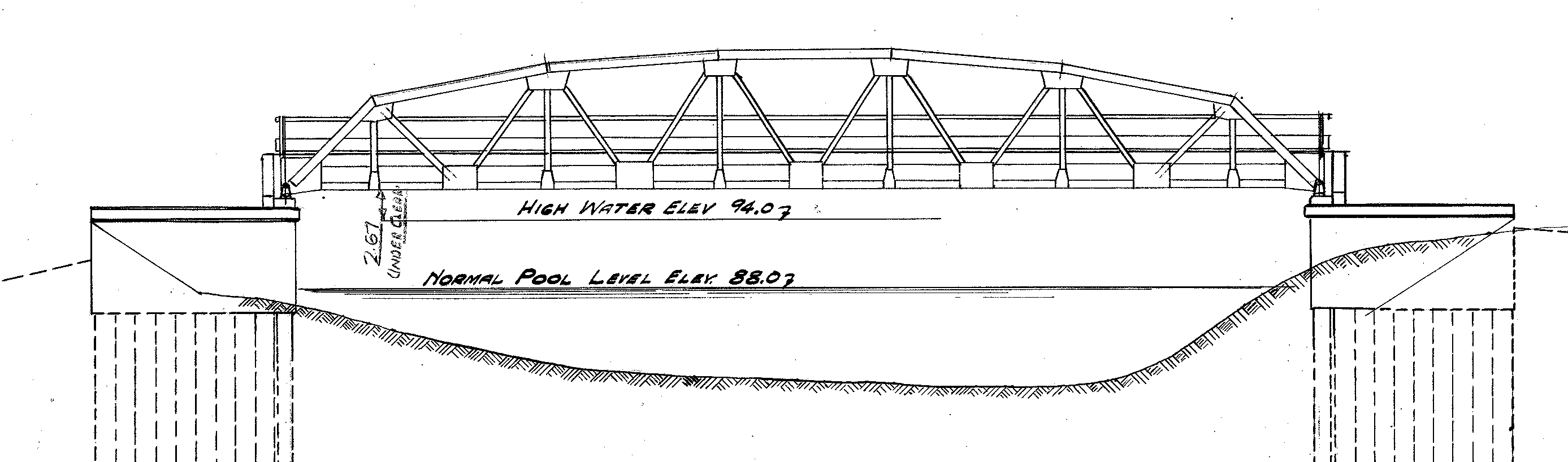

- Location within Indiana Location within the United States
- Location: S-BRITE, S. Sharon Chapel Rd., West Lafayette, Indiana
- Coordinates: 40°24′31.5″N 86°57′2″W
- Area: less than one acre
- Built: 1937
- Built by: Couse and Sanders
- Architect: St. Clair County Road Commission
- Architectural style: Warren pony truss
- MPS: Highway Bridges of Michigan MPS
- NRHP reference No.: 00000012
- Added to NRHP: January 28, 2000

The Indian Trail Road–Belle River Bridge, also known as the Radike Mills Bridge, is a historic bridge that was originally constructed on Indian Trail Road, spanning the Belle River in China Township, Michigan. It was listed on the National Register of Historic Places in 2000. The bridge has been moved, and now is located at Purdue University's Steel Bridge Research, Inspection, Training and Engineering Center on South Sharon Chapel Road in West Lafayette, Indiana.

== History ==
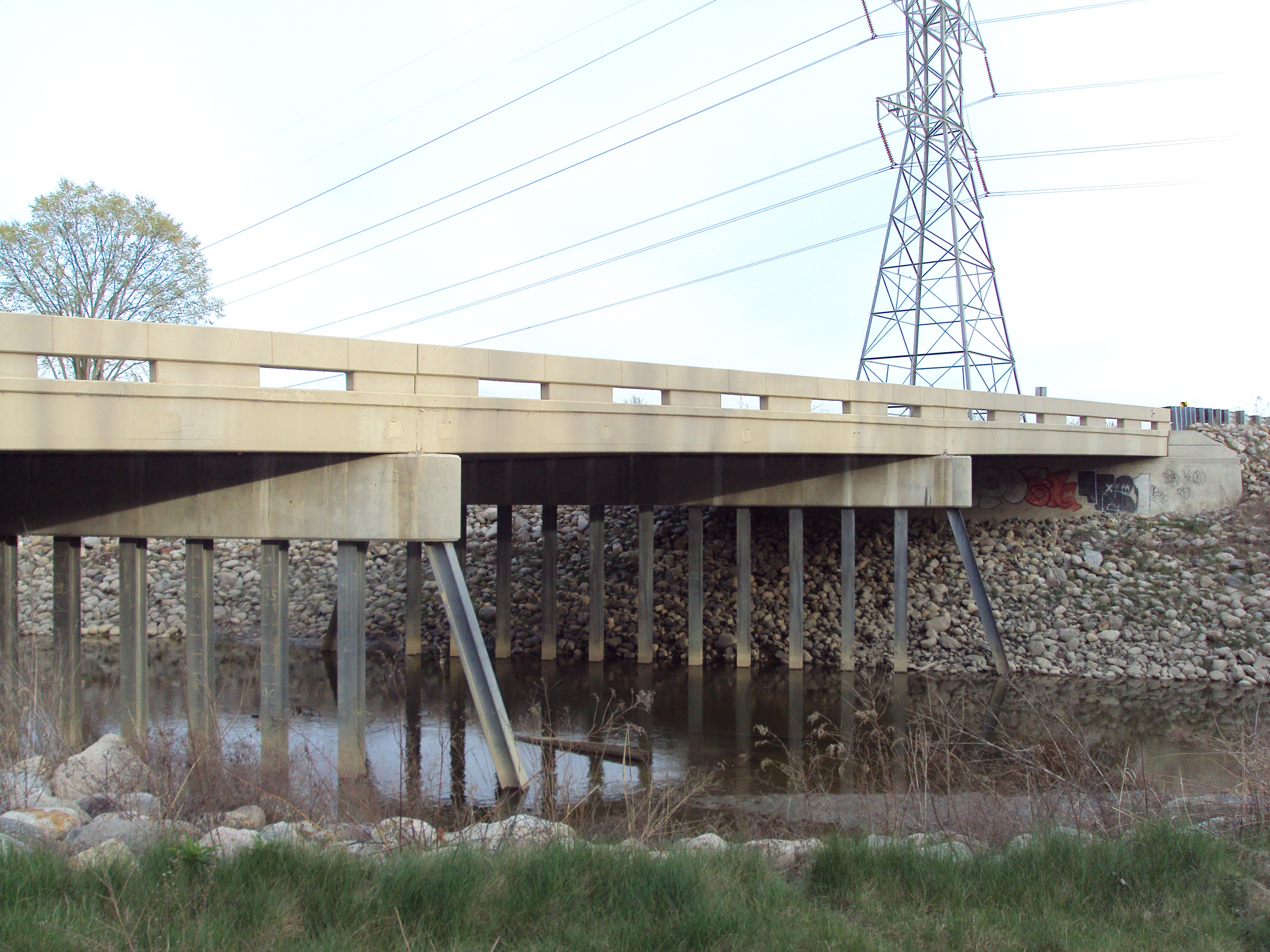
Replacement bridge on Indian Trail Road, installed 2008

During the Great Depression, the St. Clair County Road Commission aggressively sought federal funds for road and bridge work, in large part to provide work for local citizens. In 1935, the St. Clair County Road Commission applied for a grant from the Federal Emergency Administration of Public Works to construct a bridge in this location. The grant was approved in late 1936, and included additional funds for a second bridge nearby. The county opened bidding for the bridge at the end of October, and hired the Detroit firm of Couse and Sanders to construct the bridge at a cost of $33,200.78. The bridge was completed in July 1937.

In 2008, the bridge was removed from its original location and replaced with a modern bridge. The original 1937 bridge was shipped to the Calhoun County Historic Bridge Park, where it resided until 2015. In 2015, it was delivered to Purdue's Steel Bridge Research, Inspection, Training and Engineering Center (S-BRITE), where it has been incorporated into their Bridge Component Gallery.

== Description ==
The bridge is a six-panel Warren pony truss bridge with riveted connections measuring 91 feet long. The original installation spanned 88 feet. The main structure consists of an upper chords made of back-to-back channels, lower chords and diagonals made of pairs of angles, and I-beam verticals. The floor is supported with an I-beam. A railing was in place on each side, along with a modern metal guardrail.
