= Wadhams Road–Pine River Bridge =

- U.S. National Register of Historic Places
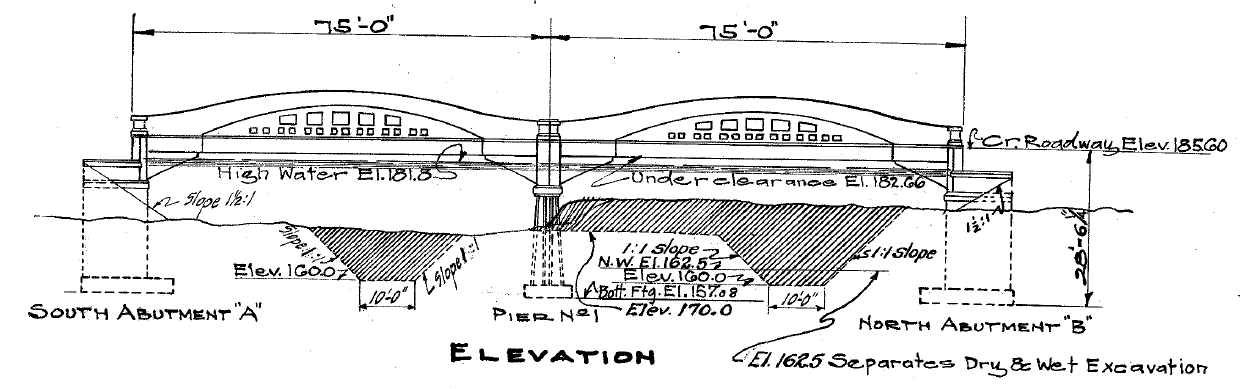
- Original bridge plans

- Location within Michigan Location within the United States
- Interactive map
- Location: Wadhams Rd. over Pine River, Saint Clair Township, Michigan
- Coordinates: 42°52′17″N 82°33′28″W
- Area: less than one acre
- Built: 1928
- Built by: Walter Toebe and Company
- Architect: Michigan State Highway Department
- Architectural style: Concrete through girder
- Demolished: 2007
- MPS: Highway Bridges of Michigan MPS
- NRHP reference No.: 00000014
- Added to NRHP: January 28, 2000

The Wadhams Road–Pine River Bridge was a bridge carrying Wadhams Road over the Pine River in Saint Clair Township, Michigan. It was one of the few remaining multiple-span, curved-chord through girder bridges, a type unique to Michigan. The bridge was demolished in 2007.

== History ==
This bridge was a joint product of the Michigan State Highway Department and the St. Clair County Road Commission, with each party paying half. The State Highway Department solicited bids to construct this bridge in mid-1927. They awarded the contract to Walter Toebe and Company of Shingleton, Michigan, for $37,679 (equivalent to $542,197 in 2024), with an additional cost for cement of $2,791 (equivalent to $40,000 in 2024). The total cost of the project was $47,971 (equivalent to $690,298 in 2024).

== Description ==
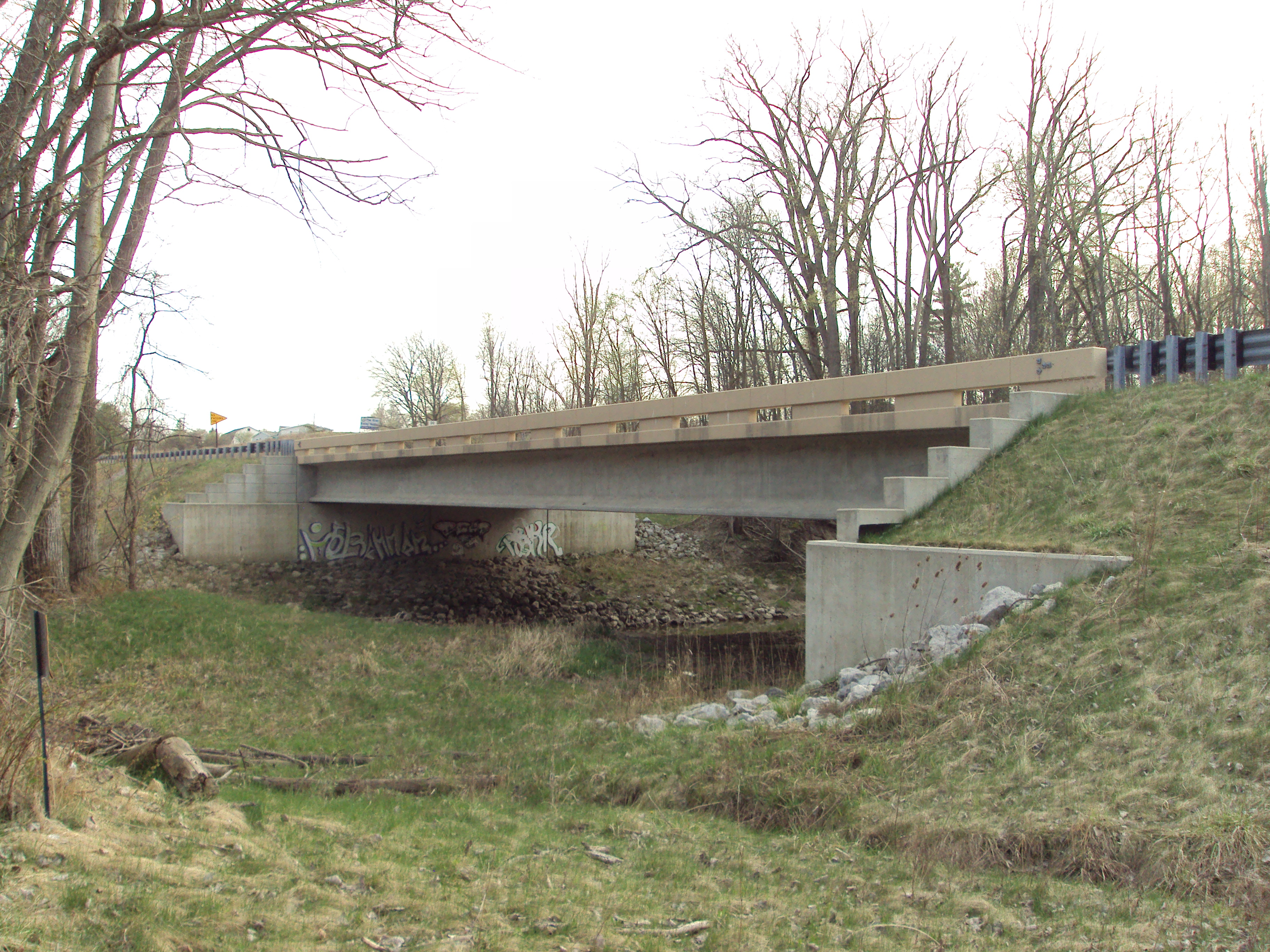
Replacement bridge, 2011

The Wadhams Road Bridge was 150 feet (46 m) long, and consisted of two 70-foot (21 m) curved chord, concrete through-girder spans. The bridge was 28 feet (8.5 m) wide, and carried a 22-foot-wide (6.7 m) roadway with concrete girders on each side, serving as railings. Each girder contained five openings, with a row of 14 recessed square panels below. The bridge sat on a solid concrete pier with slightly pointed cutwaters on each end.
