= Howard Block =

Howard Block may refer to:

- Howard Block (Brockton, Massachusetts)
- Howard Block (Port Huron, Michigan)
