= Masters Road–Belle River Bridge =

- U.S. National Register of Historic Places
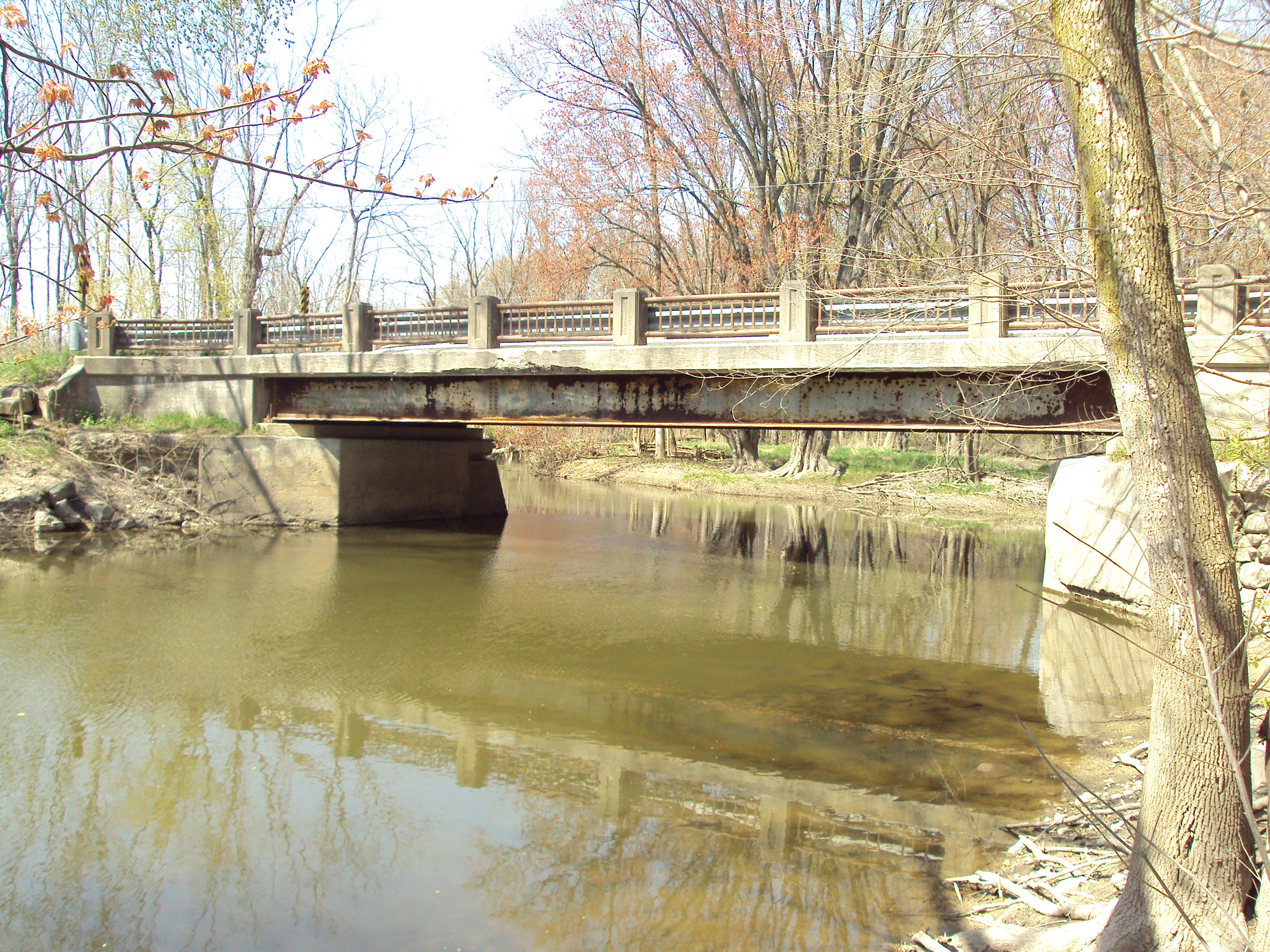

- Location within Michigan Location within the United States
- Interactive map
- Location: Masters Rd. over Belle R., Riley Township, Michigan
- Coordinates: 42°56′24″N 82°49′50″W
- Area: less than one acre
- Built: 1935
- Built by: J.H. Baker & Sons
- Architect: St. Clair Co. Road Commission
- Architectural style: Steel I-beam Stringer
- MPS: Highway Bridges of Michigan MPS
- NRHP reference No.: 99001728
- Added to NRHP: January 27, 2000

The Masters Road–Belle River Bridge is a bridge carrying Masters Road over the Belle River in Riley Township, Michigan. It was listed on the National Register of Historic Places in 2000.

== History ==
During the Great Depression, the St. Clair County Road Commission aggressively sought federal funds for road and bridge work, in large part to provide work for local citizens. This bridge was constructed as a result of the Depression-era program. Plans for the bridge were drawn up by the Road Commission, and bids for construction were requested in late 1934. The firm of J.H. Baker & Sons won the contract with a bid of $9391.

== Description ==
The bridge consists of a single 55-foot span, 24 feet wide, made up of five steel stringers covered with a concrete deck. The deck is covered with dirt and gravel. Railings made up of two horizontal pipe rails with vertical steel bars in between run on each side. The railing is supported by concrete railing posts resting on a concrete curb. The posts have faceted corners, stepped tops, and recessed panels, demonstrating a Streamline Moderne influence. The railings and the wing walls below gently curve to meet the river banks. The wing walls are constructed of random-laid stone with concrete coping, and are likely the remnants of an earlier bridge located at this site.
