= Marine City Water Works =

- U.S. National Register of Historic Places
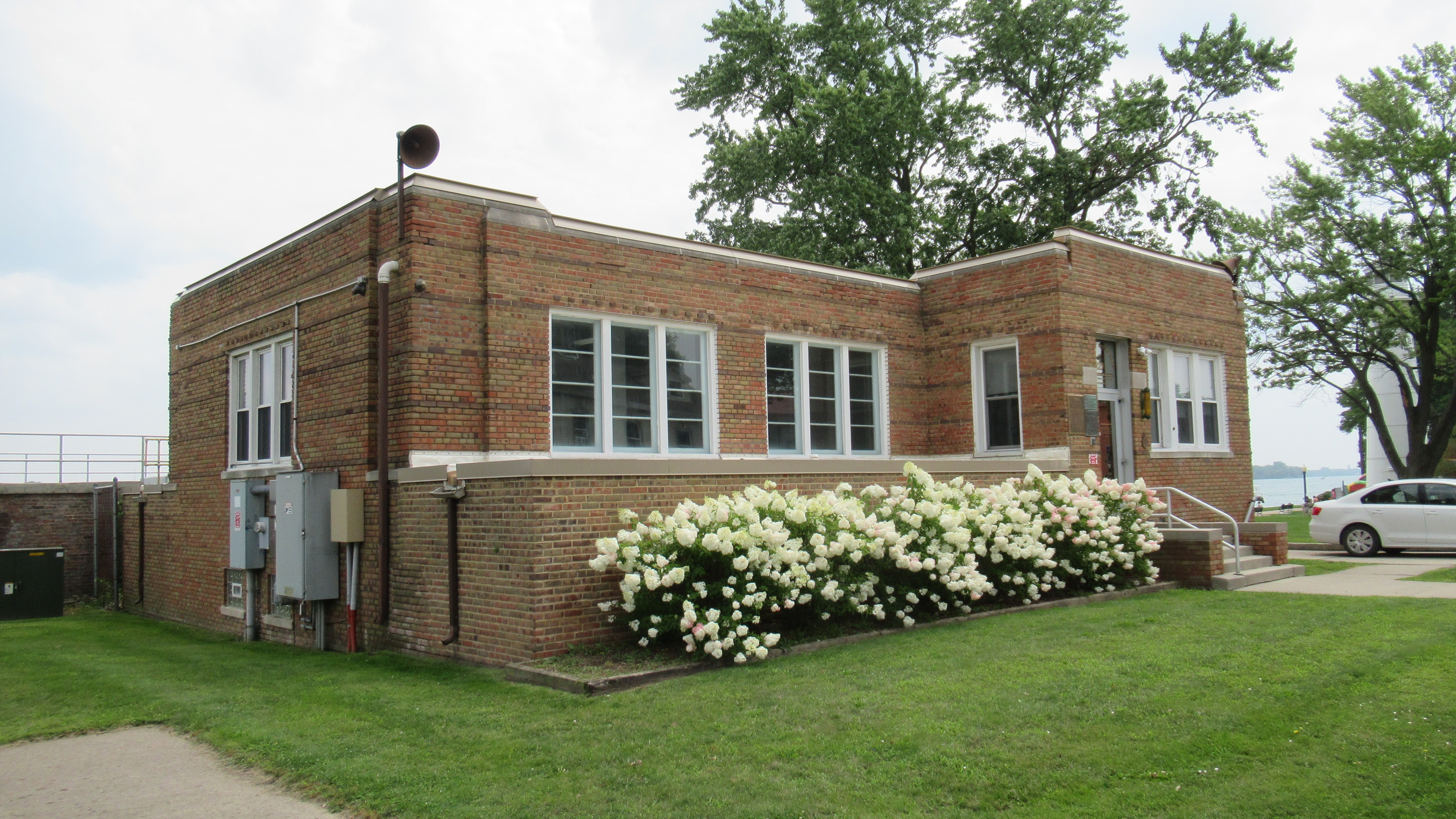

- Location within Michigan Location within the United States
- Interactive map
- Location: 229 S. Main St., Marine City, Michigan
- Coordinates: 42°43′3″N 82°29′36″W
- Area: .91 acres (0.37 ha)
- Built: 1935
- Built by: Bass Engineering and Construction Company
- Architect: Pate & Hirn Engineers
- Architectural style: Art Deco
- NRHP reference No.: 11000667
- Added to NRHP: September 15, 2011

The Marine City Water Works is a public works building located at 229 South Main Street in Marine City, Michigan. It was listed on the National Register of Historic Places in 2011.

== History ==
What is now Marine City was laid out in 1820 by Captain Samuel Ward, a shipbuilder from Vermont. During the next 25 years, over 30 shipyards were established in the area. These, and the discovery of salt deposits in 1882, led to a substantial growth in Marine City. The influx of residents in the 1870s and 1880s led to concerns over public health, and Marine City's first public water works system was constructed in 1885.

However, by the late 1920s, the 1885 facility was clearly no longer adequate at supplying clean water to the community. However, three special elections to raise money for a new facility all were defeated. A sharp increase in water-borne disease, including typhoid fever, in the area led the Michigan State Health Department to mandate a new treatment facility be constructed. In 1935, the city applied to the Public Works Administration for a $45,000 grant to cover 45% of the cost of the new facility. The grant was approved, and voters approved the raising of the remaining funds soon thereafter. The city hired Pate & Hirn Engineers of Detroit to prepare plans for the new facility, and the Bass Engineering & Construction Company to build the plant. Construction began in December 1935, and was completed in August 1936.

An addition was constructed in 1968, and substantial rehabilitation was done in 2005.

== Description ==
The Marine City Water Works is located at the edge of downtown Marine City, on the bank of the St. Clair River. It consists of two structures: a main building and a nearby sedimentation basin with wash water tank tower. An underground clear water reservoir is located below grade. The main building faces west toward Water Street, and the buildings are surrounded on all sides by grass lawn.

The main building is a small one-story, rectangular Art Deco building with walls of load-bearing brick on a concrete block foundation. It measures roughly 53 feet by 50 feet. It has a flat roof and low parapet walls with stone coping. Two corners of the building contain filtration tanks, which project beyond the walls; the top of the projection end beneath the windowsill line.

The front has an asymmetrical facade, four bays wide, with a projecting off-center entry bay. A small stairway leads to a landing in front of the entryway, which is through a modern steel door. Beside the door are four commemorative plaques and an original light fixture. There are two secondary entrances, one on the side, and one on the rear. The original windows are single-hung wood sash units with four horizontal lights. Many of these have been replaced in 2005 with modern one-over-one light, triple-track vinyl sash units.

The interior contains a lobby, small office, laboratory space, and a filter room.

The sedimentation basin is a freestanding rectangular structure, located approximately five feet behind the main building. It is constructed of brick, with the original footprint measuring 60 feet by 37 feet. A 20-foot wide addition was constructed in 1968.
