= Vernier Street–Swan Creek Bridge =

- U.S. National Register of Historic Places
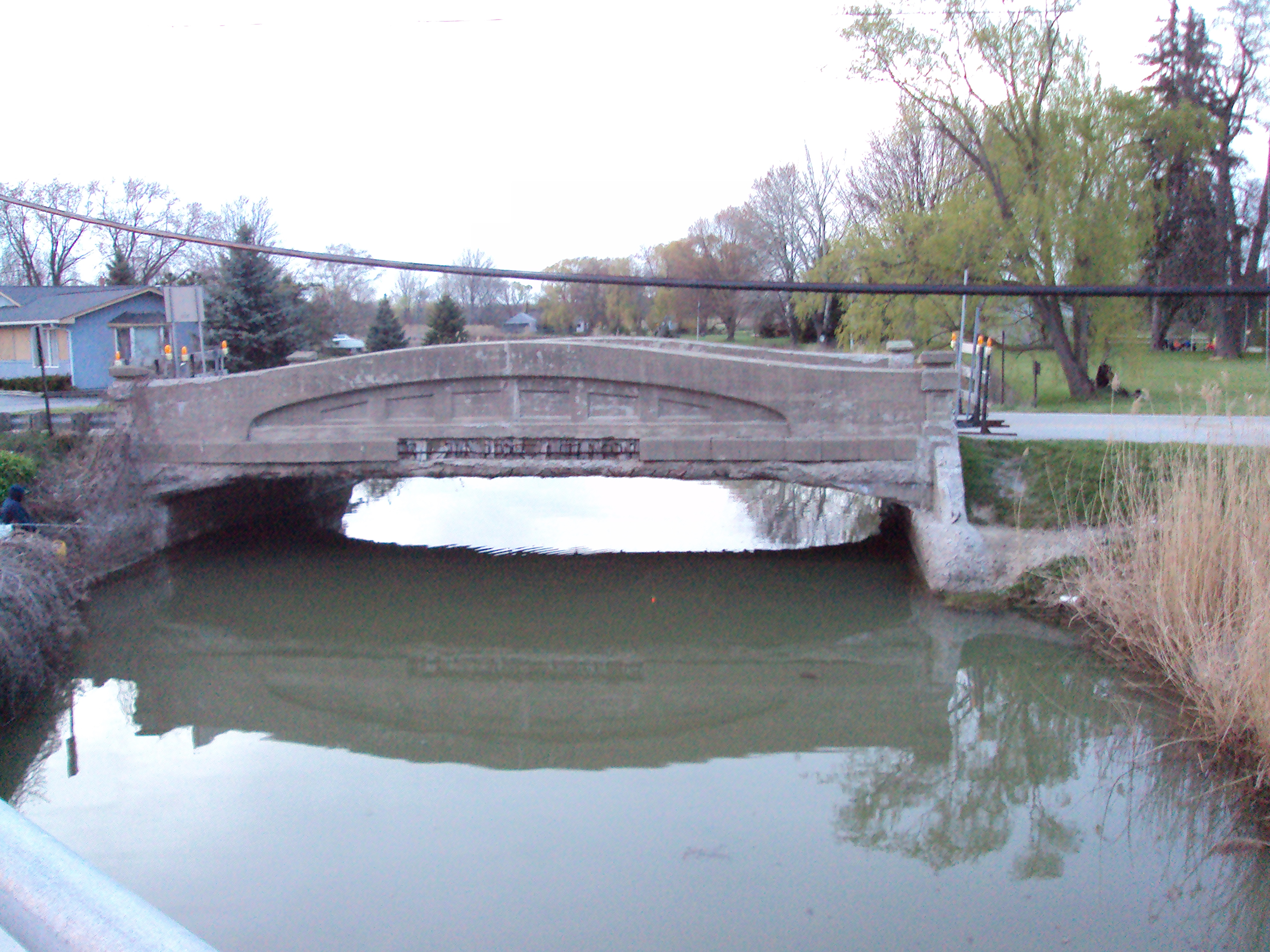
- Bridge in 2011, prior to demolition

- Location within Michigan Location within the United States
- Interactive map
- Location: Vernier St. over Swan Cr., Ira Township, Michigan
- Coordinates: 42°40′50″N 82°39′29″W
- Area: less than one acre
- Built: 1922
- Built by: J.E. Mason
- Architect: Michigan State Highway Department
- Architectural style: Concrete through girder
- Demolished: 2014
- MPS: Highway Bridges of Michigan MPS
- NRHP reference No.: 00000011
- Added to NRHP: January 28, 2000

The Vernier Street–Swan Creek Bridge was a historic bridge carrying Vernier Street over Swan Creek in Ira Township, Michigan. It was listed on the National Register of Historic Places in 2000. It was at one time one of the oldest remaining curved-chord though girder bridges, a design unique to the state of Michigan. The bridge was demolished in 2014.

== History ==
In 1914, the bridge that until that point spanned Swan Creek at this site was determined to be unsafe. The local community approached the St. Clair County Road Commission and requested a new bridge be built. The Commission did preliminary work, and by October 1915 estimated a cost of $8000 to replace the bridge. However, the project was delayed, and canceled in late 1916. However, the project was revived in 1921/22 by the state of Michigan. The Michigan State Highway Department constructed two trunk line bridges over Swan Creek, both of which were 50-foot concrete girder spans with 22-foot roadway. One was Rose Construction of Marine City for $9,959.20, and the other, at this location, was constructed by contractor J. E. Mason of Marine City for $11,894.42.

In 1932, the state highway (now designated M-29) was diverted farther southward, and the small section bypassed, including the bridge, was re-designated Vernier Street. The bridge was slated for demolition in 2014, and eventually demolished in the summer of that year.

== Description ==
The bridge was a concrete through-girder bridge with a curved top chord. Each of the solid concrete girders contained a recessed panel which held six smaller recessed panels. The endposts supporting the girder endposts were topped with a slanted pedestal, two of which contained plaques identifying the bridge as a state highway department trunkline bridge constructed during the tenure of Frank F. Rogers's as commissioner. The bridge spanned 45 feet, and carried a 30-foot-wide deck with a 22-foot-wide roadway.
