= St. Clair Tunnel =

Rail tunnel between the US and Canada

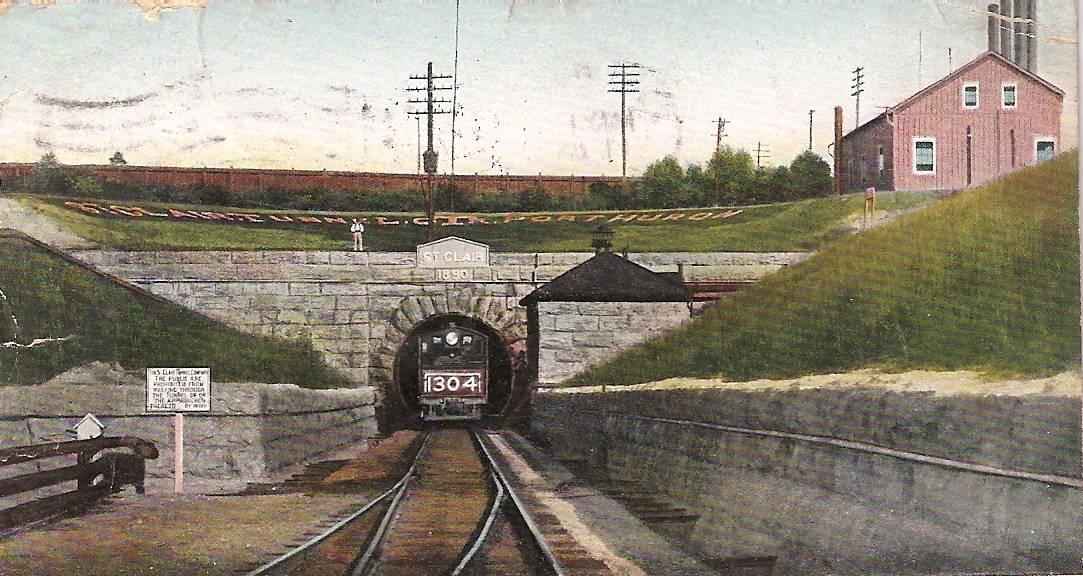
- View of the original tunnel (closed in 1994) from a 1907 postcard
- Interactive map of St. Clair Tunnel

Overview
- Official name: Paul M. Tellier Tunnel (second tunnel)
- Location: St. Clair River between Port Huron, Michigan and Sarnia, Ontario
- Coordinates: 42°57′30″N 82°24′38″W

Operation
- Opened: 1891 (first tunnel); 1994 (second tunnel)
- Closed: 1994 (first tunnel)
- Operator: Canadian National Railway

Technical
- Length: 6,025 feet (1,836 m) (first tunnel); 6,129 feet (1,868 m) (second tunnel)
- No. of tracks: Single (each tunnel)
- Location on a map of Michigan

U.S. National Register of Historic Places
- Designated: October 15, 1970
- Reference no.: 70000684

U.S. National Historic Landmark
- Designated: April 19, 1993
- Built: 1889
- Architect: Beach, Alfred; Hobson, Joseph
- Governing body: Private

Michigan State Historic Site

The St. Clair Tunnel is the name for two separate rail tunnels which were built under the St. Clair River between Sarnia, Ontario and Port Huron, Michigan. The original opened in 1891 and was the first full-size (Note: By full-size it is meant that it allowed a railroad to run through it.) subaqueous tunnel built in North America. It was replaced by a new larger tunnel in 1994. It is a National Historic Landmark of the United States, and has been designated a civil engineering landmark by both US and Canadian engineering bodies.

== First tunnel (1891–1995) ==
The first underwater rail tunnel in North America was opened by the St. Clair Tunnel Company in 1891. The company was a subsidiary of the Grand Trunk Railway (GTR), which used the new route to connect with its subsidiary Chicago and Grand Trunk Railway, predecessor to the Grand Trunk Western Railroad (GTW). Before the tunnel's construction, Grand Trunk was forced to use time-consuming rail ferries to transfer cargo.

The tunnel was an engineering marvel in its day and designed by Joseph Hobson. The development of original techniques were achieved for excavating in a compressed air environment. The Beach tunnelling shield, designed by Alfred Ely Beach, was used to assist workmen in removing material from the route of the tunnel and left a continuous iron tube nearly 7,000 feet (2,100 m) long. Freight trains used the tunnel initially with the first passenger trains using it in 1892.

The tunnel measured 6,025 feet (1,836 m) from portal to portal. The actual width of the St. Clair River at this crossing is only 2,290 feet (698 m). The tube had a diameter of 19 feet 10 inches (6.05 m) and hosted a single standard gauge track. It was built at a cost of $2.7 million (equivalent to $96.8 million in 2025 adjusted for inflation).

=== Locomotives ===
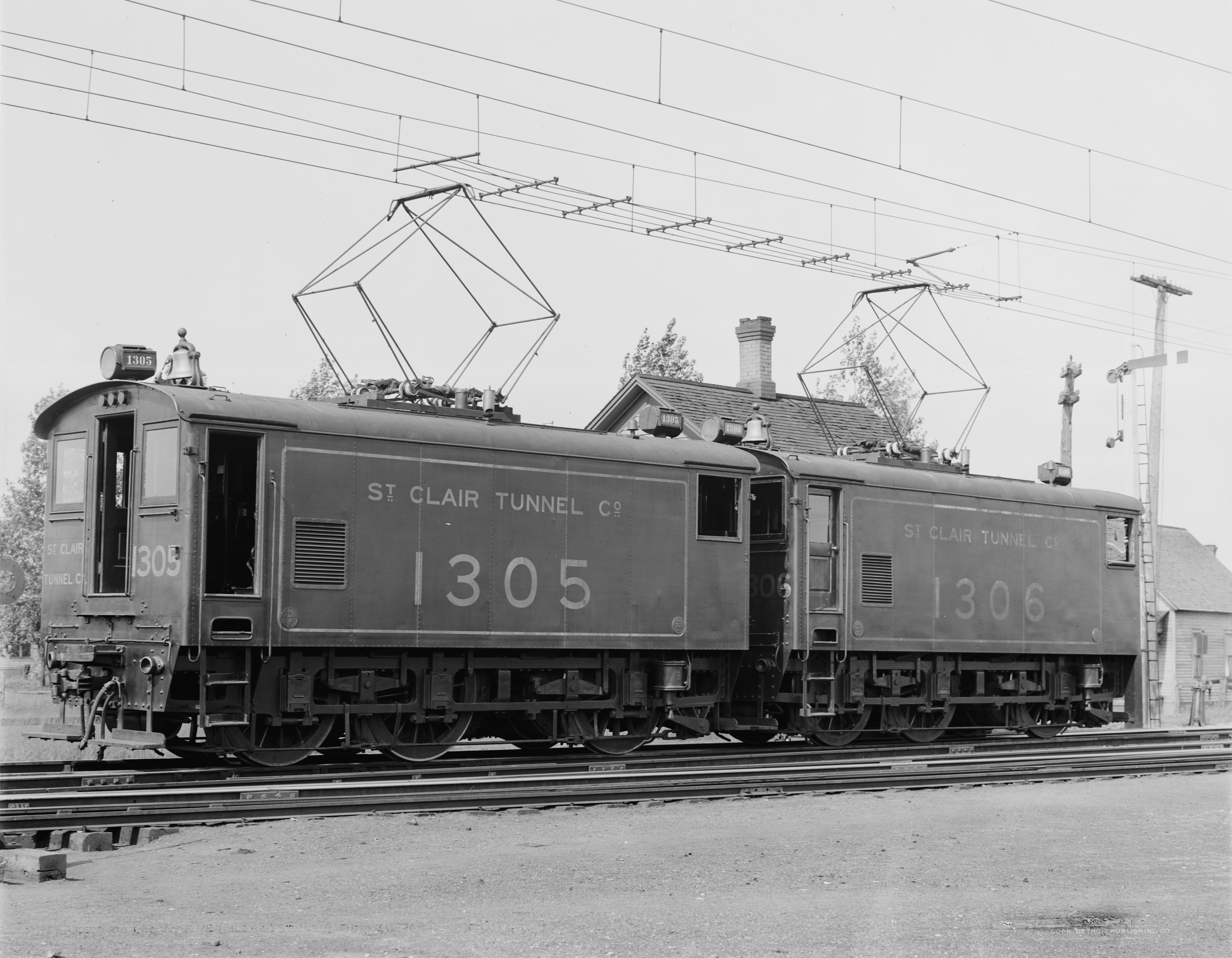
Two electric-powered St. Clair locomotives, at Port Huron.

Steam locomotives were used initially to pull trains through the tunnel, however concerns over suffocation should a train stall while inside led to the installation of catenary wires for electric locomotives by 1907. These entered regular service on May 17, 1908. The locomotives were built by Baldwin-Westinghouse.

A total of six electric locomotives were supplied by 1909. Each were equipped with three 240 hp (180 kW) single-phase motors and weighed 65 short tons (59.0 t; 58.0 long tons). They had a rigid wheel base and operated on a 3,300-volt, 25 cycle, single phase current. They had a maximum draw bar pull of 40,000 lbf (180 kN) and a running draw bar pull of 25,000 pounds-force (110 kN) at 10 miles per hour (16 km/h). According to a 1909 publication, double heading was standard practice when pulling 1,000 short tons (907.2 t; 892.9 long tons) trains up the 2% grade. The electric line's total length was 4 miles (6.4 km) and the trains were able run between 20 miles per hour (32 km/h) to 30 miles per hour (48 km/h). The Grand Trunk Railway used the locomotives to transfer both passenger and freight trains through the tunnel.

In 1923, the GTR was nationalized by Canada's federal government, which then merged the bankrupt railway into the recently formed Canadian National Railway. CN also assumed control of Grand Trunk Western as a subsidiary and the tunnel company and continued operations much as before.

The electric locomotives were retired in 1958 and scrapped in 1959 after CN withdrew its last steam locomotives on trains passing through the tunnel. New diesel locomotives did not cause the same air quality problems in this relatively short tunnel.

=== Freight cars ===
After the World War II, railways in North America started to see the dimensions of freight cars increase. Canadian National (identified as CN after 1960) was forced to rely upon rail ferries to carry freight cars, such as hicube boxcars, automobile carriers, certain intermodal cars and chemical tankers, which exceeded the limits of the tunnel's dimensions.

=== Recognition ===
The tunnel was designated a Civil Engineering Landmark by both the Canadian and the American Societies of Civil Engineers in 1991.

The tunnel was declared a U.S. National Historic Landmark in 1993.

The construction of the tunnel has also been recognized as National Historic Event by Parks Canada since 1992, with a plaque at the site.

== Second tunnel (1995–present) ==
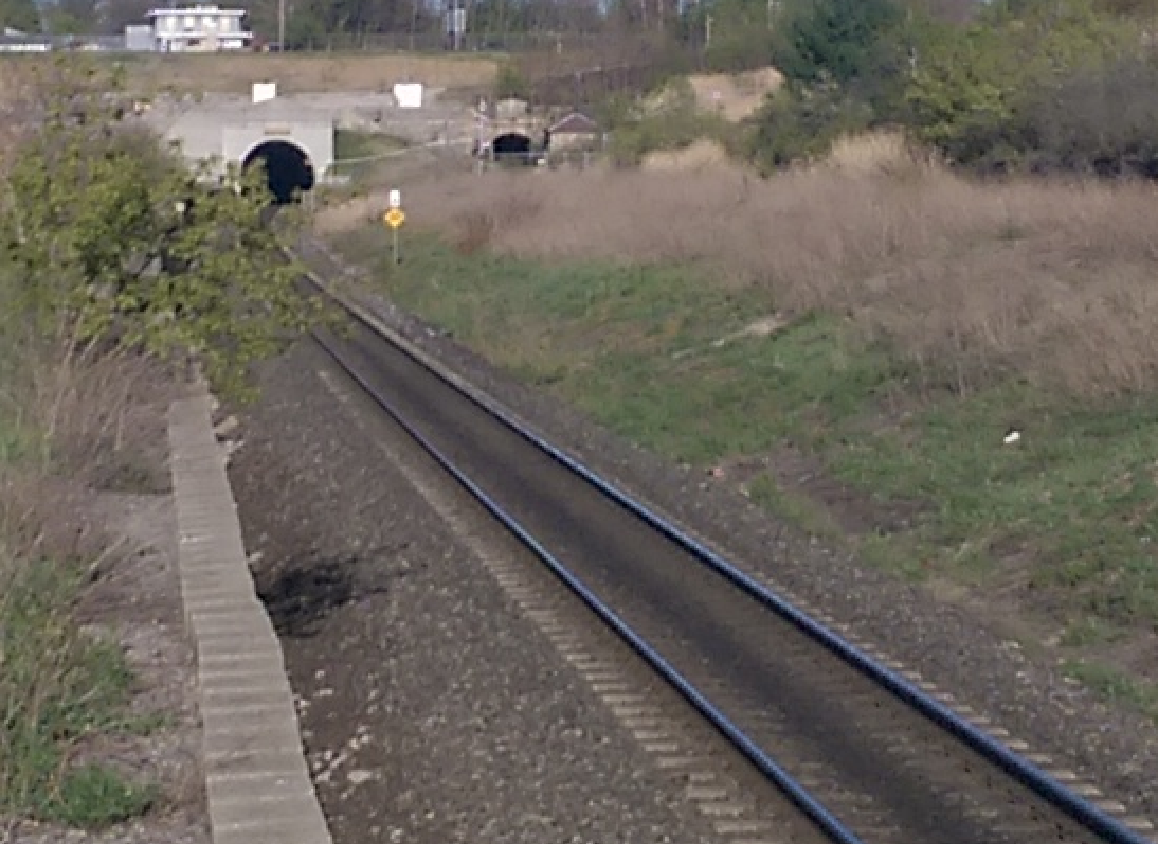
The new tunnel, left, from the Port Huron side, in 2017. The old tunnel can be seen on the right.

The second tunnel was built to handle intermodal rail cars with double-stacked shipping containers, which could not fit through the original tunnel or the Michigan Central Railway Tunnel in Detroit. By the early 1990s, CN had commissioned engineering studies for a replacement tunnel to be built adjacent to the existing St. Clair River tunnel. In 1992, new CN president Paul Tellier foresaw that CN would increase its traffic in the Toronto–Chicago corridor. The Canada-U.S. Free Trade Agreement was implemented in 1989 and discussions for a North American Free Trade Agreement between Canada, the United States and Mexico discussions were underway at that time (NAFTA was implemented in 1994). It was anticipated that import/export traffic on CN's corridor would increase dramatically as a result.

In 1993, CN began construction of the newer and larger tunnel. Tellier declared at the ceremonies:

[The] tunnel will give CN the efficiencies it needs to become a strong competitive force in North American transportation

Unlike the first tunnel, which was hand dug from both ends, the new tunnel was constructed using a tunnel boring machine named Excalibore. It started on the Canadian side and dug its way to the U.S.

The tunnel opened in late 1994 whereupon trains stopped using the adjacent original tunnel, whose bore was sealed. The new tunnel was dedicated on May 5, 1995. It measures 6,129 feet (1,868 m) from portal to portal with a bore diameter of 27 feet 6 inches (8.38 m). It has a single standard gauge track that can accommodate all freight cars currently in service in North America; for this reason, the rail ferries were also retired in 1994 when the new tunnel opened.

On November 30, 2004, CN announced that the new St. Clair River tunnel would be named the Paul M. Tellier Tunnel in honour of the company's retired president, Paul Tellier, who foresaw the impact the tunnel would have on CN's eastern freight corridor. Signs bearing his name were installed over each tunnel portal.

== Incident ==
On June 28, 2019, train CN M38331 28, hauling 100+ cars, had 40 cars derail in the tunnel, spilling 13,700 U.S. gallons (52,000 L) of sulfuric acid and closing the tunnel for several days afterwards. The tunnel re-opened on July 10, 2019. The Transportation Safety Board of Canada revealed that a modified gondola partial failure caused the car's trucks to become askew and a derailment.

== Proposed projects ==
- Tunnel doubling in order to track doubling completion from South Bend via Port Huron and Sarnia to London. the new tunnel would be at the north of the current tunnel or the south of the current tunnel; the latter option would require the old tunnel to be filled with concrete.
- Electrification at 25kV AC catenaries for CN Flint Line (South Bend–St. Clair Tunnel–London), NS Chicago Line and BNSF Northern Transcon.

== See also ==
- List of National Historic Landmarks in Michigan
- National Register of Historic Places listings in St. Clair County, Michigan
- Port Huron station
- Blue Water Bridge, a nearby international highway bridge
