= St. Clair Township, Michigan =

- Civil township
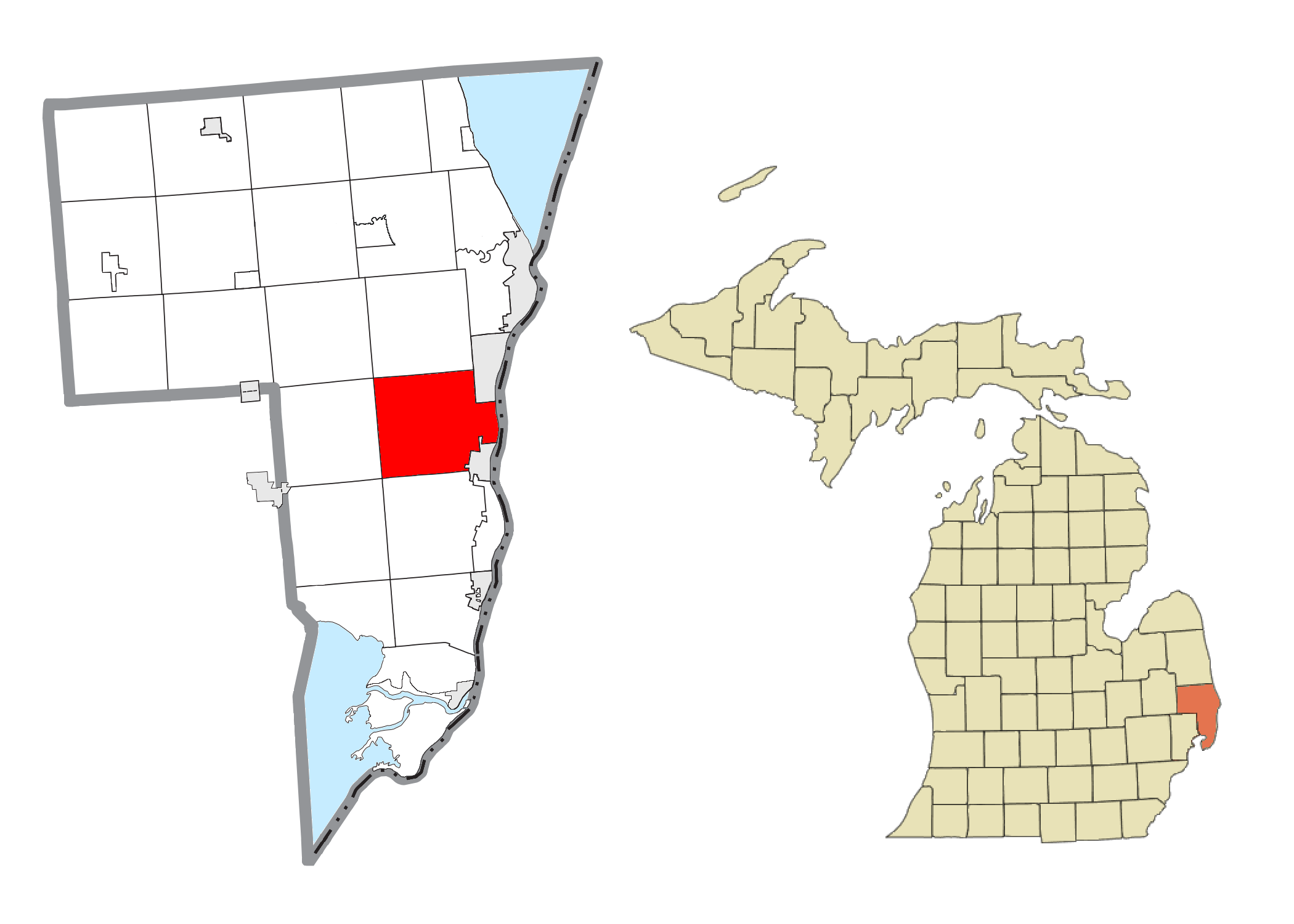
- Location within St. Clair County

- Location within the state of Michigan Location within the United States
- Coordinates: 42°52′03″N 82°32′26″W
- Country: United States
- State: Michigan
- County: St. Clair
- Established: 1818

Government
  - Supervisor: Brian Mahaffy
  - Clerk: Bonnie DiNardo

Area
  - Total: 39.16 sq mi (101.42 km^{2})
  - Land: 38.41 sq mi (99.48 km^{2})
  - Water: 0.75 sq mi (1.94 km^{2})
- Elevation: 620 ft (190 m)

Population (2020)
  - Total: 7,085
  - Density: 184.4/sq mi (71.2/km^{2})
- Time zone: UTC-5 (Eastern (EST))
  - Summer (DST): UTC-4 (EDT)
- ZIP code(s): 48040 (Marysville); 48079 (St. Clair)
- Area code: 810
- FIPS code: 26-70700
- GNIS feature ID: 1627025
- Website: Official website

St. Clair Township is a civil township of St. Clair County in the U.S. state of Michigan. The population was 7,085 at the 2020 Census. The city of St. Clair is located near the southeast corner of the township.

== Communities ==
- Rattle Run is an unincorporated community in the western part of the Township located at Gratiot Avenue and Rattle Run Road (42°51′59″N 82°35′59″W ; Elevation: 630 ft./192 m.).

== Naming ==
Being situated on the western banks of the St. Clair River, the city's name is taken from the river, which in turn was named for Lake Saint Clair. An expedition led by the French explorer René Robert Cavelier, Sieur de La Salle named it Lac Sainte-Claire, because they entered the lake on August 12, 1679, the feast day of Saint Clare of Assisi. The lake is named on English maps as early as 1710 as Saint Clare. But as early as the Mitchell Map in 1755, the spelling is presented with the current spelling as St. Clair. The name is sometimes attributed as honoring the American Revolutionary War General and Governor of the Northwest Territory Arthur St. Clair, but the name was in use with the current spelling long before St. Clair was a notable figure. However it is possible that earlier name of the lake was conflated with that of the general in naming some of the political entities near the lake and the river, such as St. Clair County, St. Clair Township, and the cities of St. Clair and St. Clair Shores.

The origin of the name has also been confused with that Patrick Sinclair, a British officer who purchased land on the St. Clair River at the outlet of the Pine River. There, in 1764, he built Fort Sinclair, which was in use for nearly twenty years before being abandoned.

== Geography ==
According to the United States Census Bureau, the township has a total area of 39.6 square miles (103 km^{2}), of which 39.0 square miles (101 km^{2}) is land and 0.6 square miles (1.6 km^{2}) (1.62%) is water.

== Demographics ==
As of the census of 2000, there were 6,423 people, 2,266 households, and 1,828 families residing in the township. The population density was 164.9 inhabitants per square mile (63.7/km^{2}). There were 2,394 housing units at an average density of 61.5 per square mile (23.7/km^{2}). The racial makeup of the township was 98.18% White, 0.26% African American, 0.23% Native American, 0.30% Asian, 0.26% from other races, and 0.76% from two or more races. Hispanic or Latino of any race were 1.04% of the population.

There were 2,266 households, out of which 38.0% had children under the age of 18 living with them, 72.1% were married couples living together, 5.5% had a female householder with no husband present, and 19.3% were non-families. 16.1% of all households were made up of individuals, and 6.6% had someone living alone who was 65 years of age or older. The average household size was 2.83 and the average family size was 3.17.

In the township the population was spread out, with 27.7% under the age of 18, 7.3% from 18 to 24, 29.1% from 25 to 44, 25.1% from 45 to 64, and 10.8% who were 65 years of age or older. The median age was 38 years. For every 100 females, there were 101.5 males. For every 100 females age 18 and over, there were 100.0 males.

The median income for a household in the township was $58,711, and the median income for a family was $65,924. Males had a median income of $52,045 versus $27,106 for females. The per capita income for the township was $24,705. About 2.5% of families and 3.2% of the population were below the poverty line, including 2.3% of those under age 18 and 1.3% of those age 65 or over.
