= China Township, Michigan =

- Charter township
- Charter Township of China
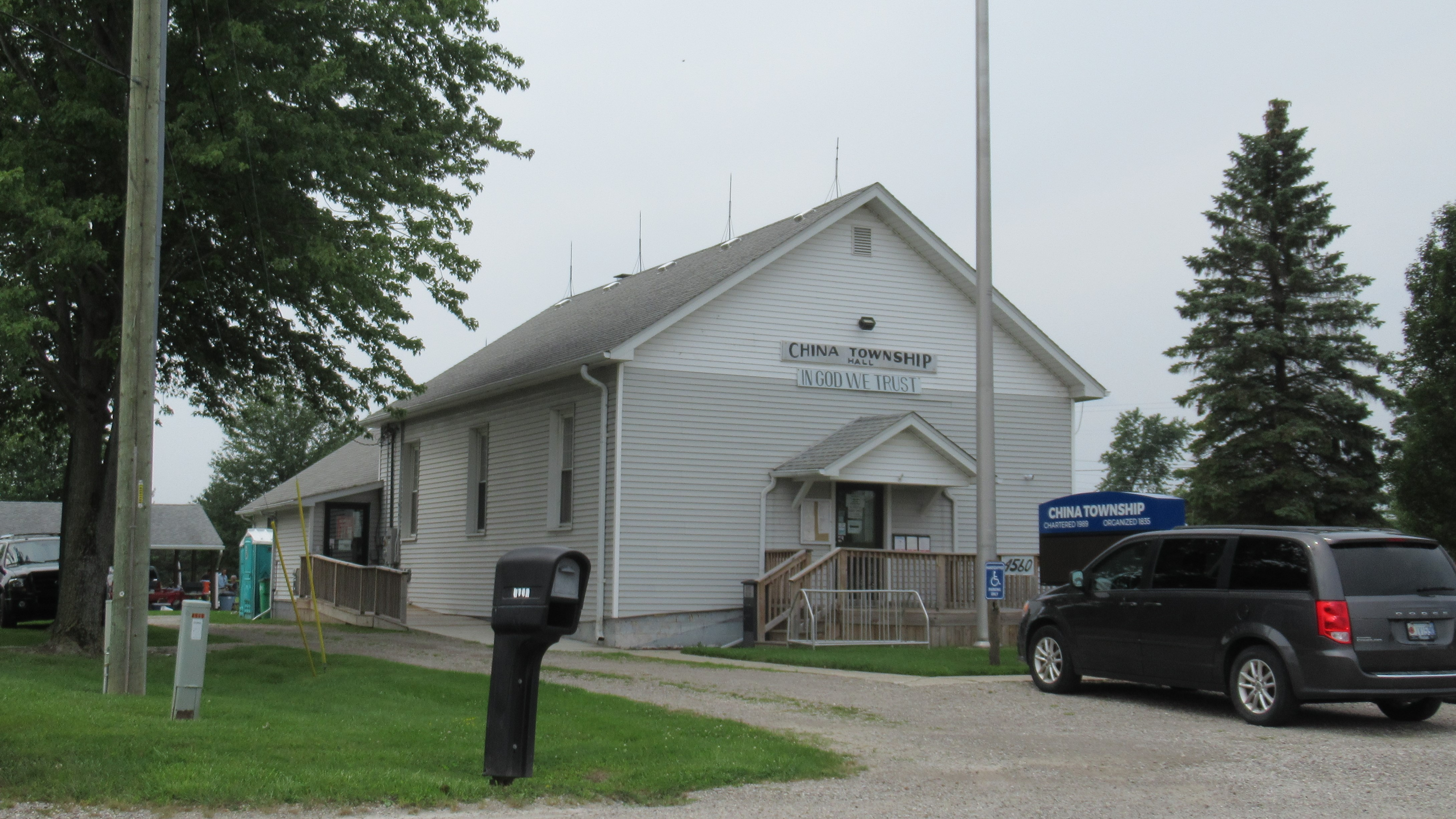
- China Township Hall

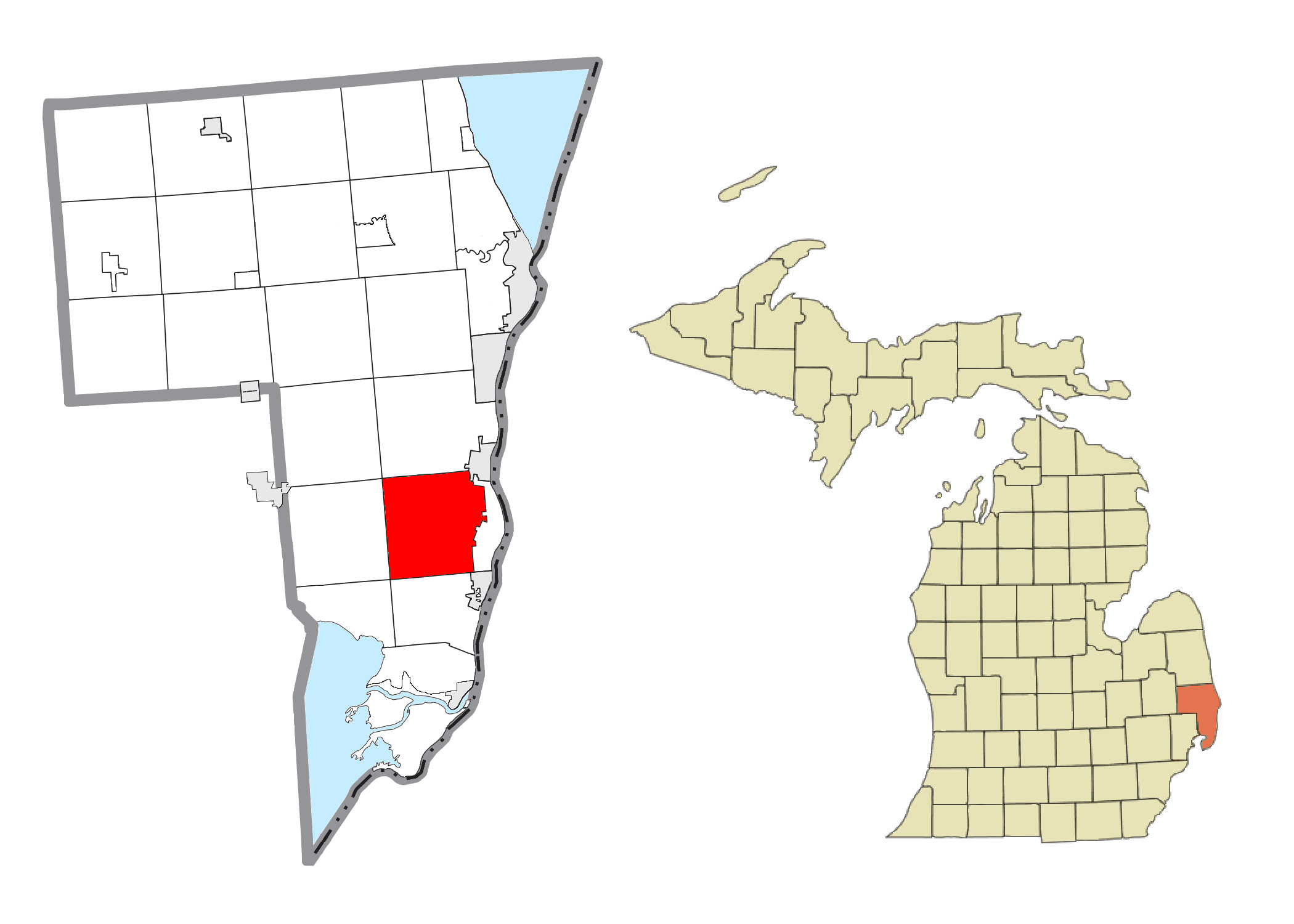
- Location within St. Clair County

- Location within the state of Michigan Location within the United States
- Coordinates: 42°46′38″N 82°32′57″W
- Country: United States
- State: Michigan
- County: St. Clair
- Established: 1834

Government
  - Supervisor: Linda Schweihofer
  - Clerk: Sharon Martin

Area
  - Total: 34.35 sq mi (88.97 km^{2})
  - Land: 34.03 sq mi (88.14 km^{2})
  - Water: 0.32 sq mi (0.83 km^{2})
- Elevation: 620 ft (189 m)

Population (2020)
  - Total: 3,509
  - Density: 103.1/sq mi (39.8/km^{2})
- Time zone: UTC-5 (Eastern (EST))
  - Summer (DST): UTC-4 (EDT)
- ZIP code(s): 48054 (East China)
- Area code: 810
- FIPS code: 26-15540
- GNIS feature ID: 1626077
- Website: Official website

China Township is a charter township of St. Clair County in the U.S. state of Michigan. The population was 3,509 at the 2020 Census. It is named after China, Maine.

== Geography ==
According to the United States Census Bureau, the Township has a total area of 34.4 square miles (89 km^{2}), all land. The township's master plan shows that it consists mostly of agricultural and residential land. The northeast corner of the Township, near the City of St. Clair, has small suburban-style developments, an elementary school and some retail.

== Demographics ==
At the 2000 census there were 3,340 people, 1,106 households, and 944 families in the township. The population density was 97.2 inhabitants per square mile (37.5/km^{2}). There were 1,130 housing units at an average density of 32.9 per square mile (12.7/km^{2}). The racial makeup of the township was 98.20% White, 0.33% African American, 0.33% Native American, 0.24% Asian, 0.03% Pacific Islander, 0.12% from other races, and 0.75% from two or more races. Hispanic or Latino of any race were 1.08%.

Of the 1,106 households, 42.6% had children under the age of 18 living with them, 77.8% were married couples living together, 5.1% had a female householder with no husband present, and 14.6% were non-families. 12.7% of households were one person, and 5.3% were one person aged 65 or older. The average household size was 3.01 and the average family size was 3.29.

In the township the population was spread out, with 29.4% under the age of 18, 6.9% from 18 to 24, 28.8% from 25 to 44, 26.1% from 45 to 64, and 8.8% 65 or older. The median age was 37 years. For every 100 females, there were 102.4 males. For every 100 females age 18 and over, there were 100.3 males.

The median household income was $62,194 and the median family income was $65,875. Males had a median income of $51,268 versus $27,292 for females. The per capita income for the township was $22,674. About 1.8% of families and 2.0% of the population were below the poverty line, including 0.7% of those under age 18 and 3.1% of those age 65 or over.

== Religion ==
The Serbian Orthodox Monastery of Saint Nikolaj Velimirović Bishop of Žiča is located at 6905 Springborn Road in China Township. The monastery, in the care of its founder V. Rev. Radiša Ninković, is under the jurisdiction of the Serbian Orthodox Church in North and South America.
