= Belle River (Michigan) =

River in Michigan, United States

Belle

Location
- Country: United States

Physical characteristics
- Source
  - location: Dryden Township, Lapeer County, Michigan
- Mouth
  - location: St. Clair River at Marine City, Michigan
  - coordinates: 42°42′25″N 82°29′50″W
  - elevation: 574 ft (175 m)
- Length: 73.5 mi (118.3 km)
- Discharge
  - location: mouth
  - average: 155.21 cu ft/s (4.395 m^{3}/s) (estimate)

The Belle River is a 73.5-mile-long (118.3 km) river in the U.S. state of Michigan, flowing into the St. Clair River in Marine City at 42°42′25″N 82°29′50″W.

The North Branch Belle River rises out of Long Lake at 43°00′50″N 83°08′41″W in section 22 of Attica Township in southeast Lapeer County. Long Lake is fed by the Long Lake Drain, which drains marshy areas to the south of the lake. From Long Lake, the river flows eastward around the north side of Imlay City. It is fed by the Hunt, Pennell, and Clark Corner drains on the northeast of Imlay City and turns southward, where it joins the main branch of the river at 42°59′31″N 83°03′57″W, now near the intersection of Interstate 69 and M-53.

The main branch of the Belle River rises in the south of Dryden Township at 42°53′54″N 83°07′50″W, in a marshy area near the boundary between Lapeer and Oakland counties. It flows mostly north and east until joined by the north branch, after which it flows mostly south and east into St. Clair County. It passes the north side of Memphis, then turns southeast and passes through the northeast corner of Macomb County. Interstate 94 crosses the river in the northeast corner of Casco Township.

The river continues east by southeast through China Township and into East China Township, where it turns south less than a half mile from the St. Clair River and parallels the St. Clair for a few miles before its mouth in downtown Marine City.

The river's watershed drains portions of Lapeer, Macomb, Oakland, and St. Clair counties.
