= Henry Howard (Port Huron politician) =

American politician (1833–1894)

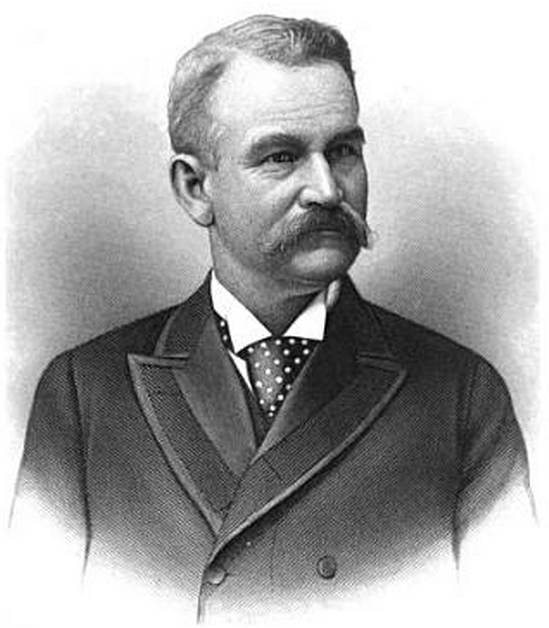

Mayor of Port Huron
- In office 1882–1882

Member of the Michigan House of Representatives from the St. Clair County 2nd district
- In office 1873–1875

Personal details
- Born: March 8, 1833 Detroit, Michigan
- Died: May 24, 1894 (aged 61) Port Huron, Michigan
- Spouse: Elizabeth Experience Spalding

Henry Howard (March 8, 1833 – May 24, 1894) was a banker and businessman, and served as the mayor of Port Huron, Michigan, and in the Michigan state legislature.

== Biography ==
Henry Howard was born March 8, 1833, in Detroit, Michigan, the son of John and Nancy Hubbard Howard. The elder Howard was a grocer and hotelier in Detroit, but the 1834 cholera outbreak convinced him to move his family to Port Huron. Once in Port Huron, John Howarn entered the lumber trade and eventually built three sawmills in the city.

Henry Howard received his schooling in Port Huron, and for four years worked in various positions in Port Huron and Detroit. In 1854, Henry Howard joined his father's business, and the two were partners for 26 years until John Howard's retirement in 1877, after which Henry continued the business alone. Henry Howard was also involved in a number of other businesses, and at one time or another was president of the Port Huron First National Bank, the Port Huron Times Company, the Port Huron Gas Light Co, the Port Huron & Northwestern Railroad, and the Northern Transit Company.

In 1856, Howard married Elizabeth Experience Spalding; the couple had six children, only two of which outlived them: Emily Louise and John Henry.

Howard was an alderman of Port Huron for 14 years, a state representative in 1873 - 1875, and served as Port Huron's mayor in 1882. He ran for state senate, but was defeated by William M. Cline. He served as Regent of the University of Michigan from 1891 until his death in 1894.

== Notes ==
- The Port Huron mayor, banker, lumberman, and state representative Henry Howard is not the same person as the nearly contemporaneous Detroit, Michigan, mayor, banker, lumberman, and state treasurer Henry Howard, despite Palmer's understandable confusion of the two. Bingham correctly differentiates the two men in his thumbnail biography.
