= Howard Block (Port Huron, Michigan) =

- U.S. National Register of Historic Places
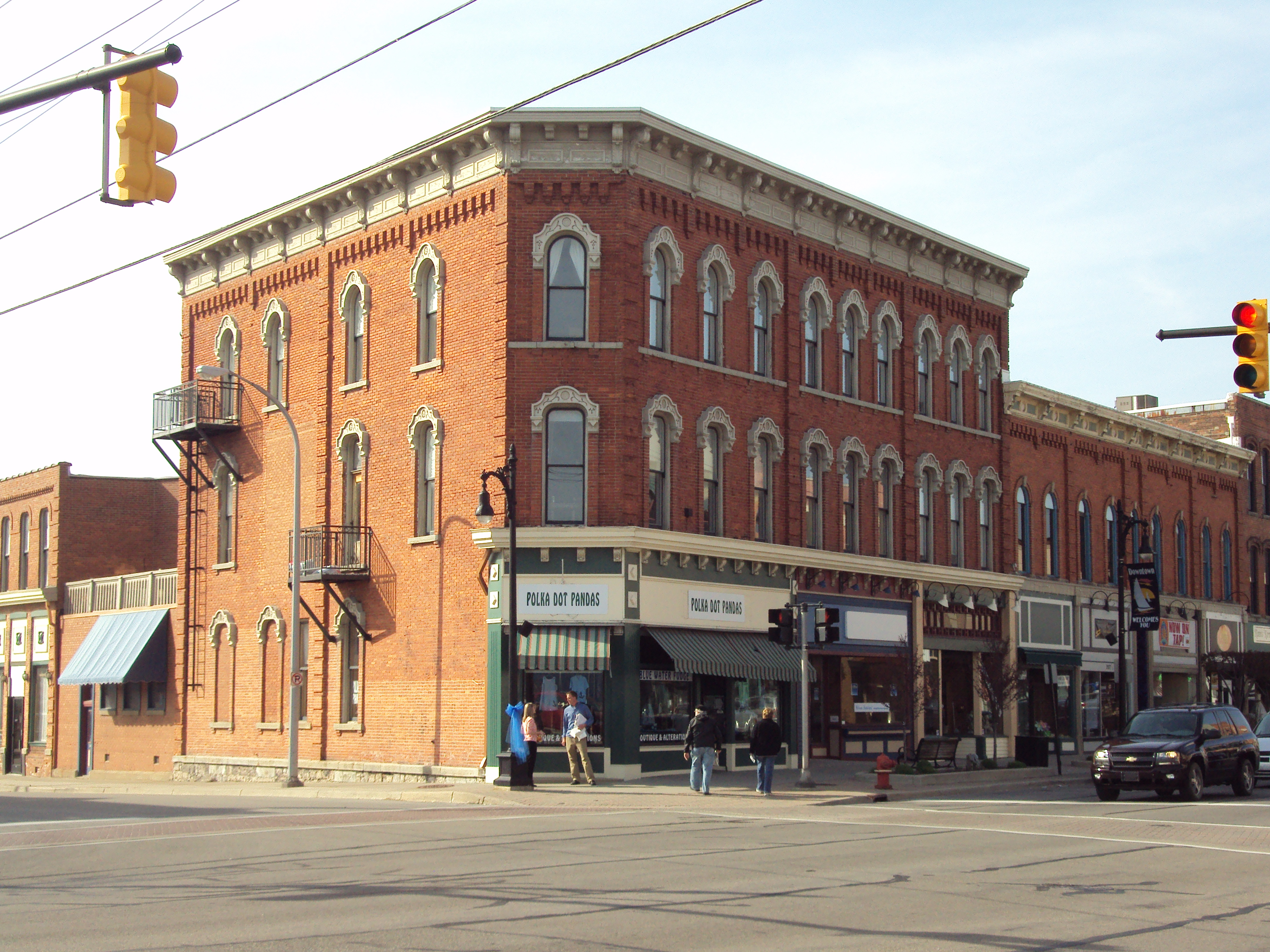

- Location within Michigan Location within the United States
- Interactive map
- Location: 201--205 Huron Ave., Port Huron, Michigan
- Coordinates: 42°58′35″N 82°25′29″W
- Area: less than one acre
- Built: 1875
- Architectural style: Italianate
- NRHP reference No.: 94000251
- Added to NRHP: March 17, 1994

The Howard Block, also known as the Central Block, is a commercial building located at 201-205 Huron Avenue in Port Huron, Michigan. It was listed on the National Register of Historic Places in 1994.

== History ==
Businessmen Henry Howard was born in 1833, and arrived in Port Huron with his family in 1834. As an adult, Howard was an entrepreneur who owned portions of a number of local sawmills and was a founder of the First National Bank. In 1863, Howard partnered with lumber broker and banker John Johnston to construct a commercial building at the corner of Military and Water Streets which housed Johnson's bank. In 1875, the pair again partnered to construct this building, the Howard Block.

One of the first tenants of the Howard Block was the First National Bank, of which Howard had assumed the presidency of in 1871. The bank remained in the building after Howard's death in 1894, and moved in 1904. The banking section of the building was then occupied by the St. Clair County Savings Bank and, later by the German American Bank. The banking section was then renovated for other commercial uses, including a drug store, jewelry shop, and a men's clothing store. Significant tenants of the building include Springer & Rose, a men's clothing store founded by J. Springer by 1871, which occupied a portion of the building from the 1910s to the 1960s; and Marx Jewelers, which occupied the former bank space starting in the mid-1930s.

== Description ==
The Howard Block is a three-story red brick High Victorian Italianate commercial block, with a two-story rear section added in approximately 1880. The building is set on the corner of Huron Avenue and Quay Street, and the footprint matches the sixty-five-degree angle between Huron Avenue and Quay Street. Three storefronts run across the Huron Avenue facade. At the corner, a narrow, one-window-bay wide section which originally held an entryway, faces diagonally toward the intersection. The second and third stories hold round-head window openings with sculptural iron caps. A wooden bracketed main cornice, restored in the 1990s, runs across the top.
