= Marine City City Hall =

- U.S. National Register of Historic Places
- Michigan State Historic Site
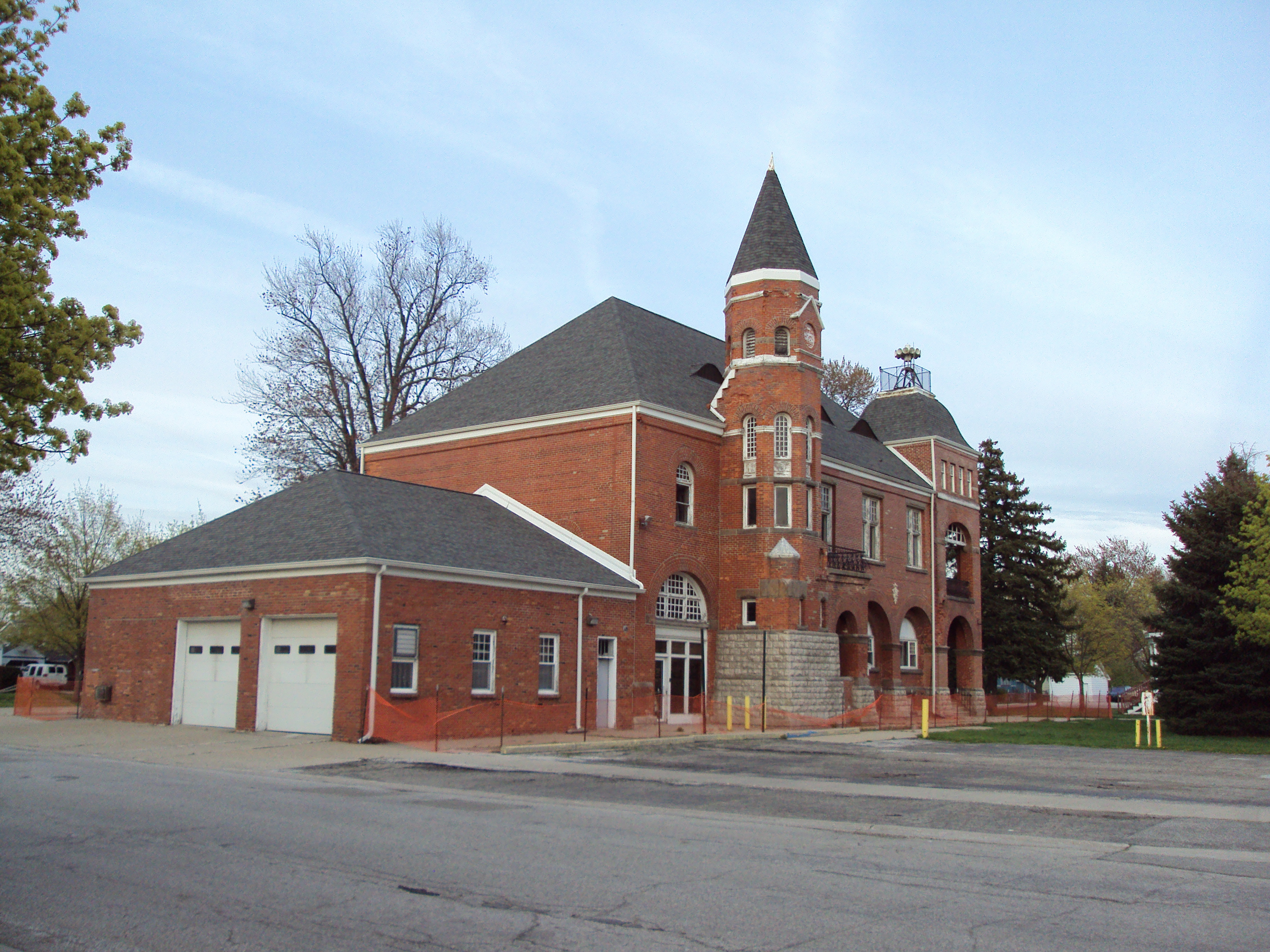

- Location within Michigan Location within the United States
- Interactive map
- Location: 300 Broadway St., Marine City, Michigan
- Coordinates: 42°43′10″N 82°29′35″W
- Area: 1 acre (0.40 ha)
- Built: 1884
- Architect: Mason & Rice, George D. Mason
- Architectural style: Queen Anne
- NRHP reference No.: 82004466
- Added to NRHP: January 11, 1982

The Marine City City Hall is a former government building located at 300 Broadway Street in Marine City, Michigan. It was listed on the National Register of Historic Places in 1982. City government offices moved out of the building in 2005.

== History ==
In 1883, Marine City citizens approved the construction of a new City Hall and fire station. In early 1884, the city council contracted architects George D. Mason and Zachariah Rice to design the building, and hired local contractor Morley and Bower to construct it. The building was completed in early 1885. In 1910, an addition was constructed on the rear to house the fire hall.

City offices moved out of the building in 2005, and it remained vacant as of 2018. The City Hall suffered physical deterioration over the course of the 20th century. In 2011, a group was formed to preserve and renovate the building.

== Description ==
The former Marine City City Hall is a two-story, rectangular red brick Richardsonian Romanesque structure, sitting on a rusticated stone foundation and topped with a hipped roof. The structure measures 45 feet by 95 feet. It has rounded arch doors and windows and two towers: one squared and one octagonal.

The main facade of the building contains a formal entryway in the center, though a rounded arch double door. Ocular windows are on the first and second story levels, and a decorative pediment extends above the cornice on one side. To the left is the square tower, with another entranceway at the first floor level, an open balcony above, and a curved, bell-shaped roof.

The octagonal tower has rounded arch windows at each story and an octagonally pointed roof. The 1910 addition to the rear is a flat-roofed, single story structure.
