= Pine River (Michigan) =

Pine River may refer to any of the following rivers in the U.S. state of Michigan:

- Pine River (Alcona County, Michigan). The main branch forms with the confluence of the East and West Branches of the Pine River at 44°29′38″N 83°23′16″W in Alcona County. The South Branch joins approximately 1.5 miles (2.4 km) to the south and flows into Iosco County, where it empties into Van Etten Lake at 44°29′38″N 83°23′16″W northwest of Oscoda.
- Pine River (Arenac County, Michigan). The main branch is formed by the confluence of the North and Middle Branches northeast of Standish and flows into the Saginaw Bay of Lake Huron at 43°58′32″N 83°51′16″W. The South Branch Pine River joins the main stream at 43°59′08″N 83°53′17″W.
- Pine River (Charlevoix County, Michigan) is a short waterway, which along with Round Lake, connects Lake Charlevoix with Lake Michigan at Charlevoix.
- Pine River (Chippewa River) rises in from Pine Lake in eastern Mecosta County, flows mostly east and south through Isabella County, then south along eastern edge of Montcalm County, then east and north through Gratiot County and Midland County, emptying into the Chippewa River at 43°36′06″N 84°17′33″W, just about two miles before it joins the Tittabawassee River near Midland. The South Branch Pine River joins the main stream at 43°30′37″N 85°00′02″W Another tributary, Miller Creek, is also sometimes known as Pine River or the West Branch Pine River. The North Branch Pine River joins the main stream at 43°26′03″N 84°50′18″W.
- Pine River (Mackinac County, Michigan) rises in Chippewa County and flows south through Mackinac County into the St. Martin Bay of Lake Huron at 46°03′09″N 84°39′22″W The North Pine River, also known as the North Branch Pine River, joins at 46°12′20″N 84°36′17″W. Another tributary, Hemlock Creek, is also known as Pine River.
- Pine River (Manistee River), also known as the South Branch Manistee River, rises in southeast Wexford County, flows southwest across northwest Osceola County, then west and north through the northeast corner of Lake County and back into southwest Wexford County, emptying into the Tippy Dam Pond on the Manistee River at 44°13′37″N 85°54′27″W. The main stream is formed from the confluence of the East Branch Pine River with the North Branch Pine River (also known as the Little Pine River) at 44°06′02″N 85°31′40″W. Another tributary, the Spaulding Creek, is also known as the Little Pine River
- Pine River (Marquette County, Michigan), in Marquette County, is a very short coastal stream draining Pine Lake into Lake Superior at 46°53′27″N 87°52′13″W, north of the Huron Mountains.
- Pine River (St. Clair River) rises in Brockway Township, St. Clair County, and flows in a southeasterly direction before it empties into the St. Clair River at 42°49′13″N 82°29′08″W on the south side of St. Clair. The South Branch Pine River joins the main stream at 42°58′11″N 82°37′10″W. Another tributary, Quakenbush Drain, is also sometimes known as Pine River.

There are also at least seventeen streams known as Pine Creek in Michigan which may sometimes be referred to as Pine River, as well some other variants. Among them are:

- Pine Creek (Maple River tributary) rises south of Alma in Newark Township, Gratiot County, flows mostly south into Clinton County, emptying into the Maple River at 43°6′33″N 84°41′35″W near Maple Rapids.
- Pine Creek (Ontonagon County, Michigan) is a north-flowing coastal stream in Ontonagon County which empties into Lake Superior at 46°50′18″N 89°29′14″W in Carp Lake Township and is also known as the Pine River.
