= Fort Gratiot =

- U.S. National Register of Historic Places
- Michigan State Historic Site
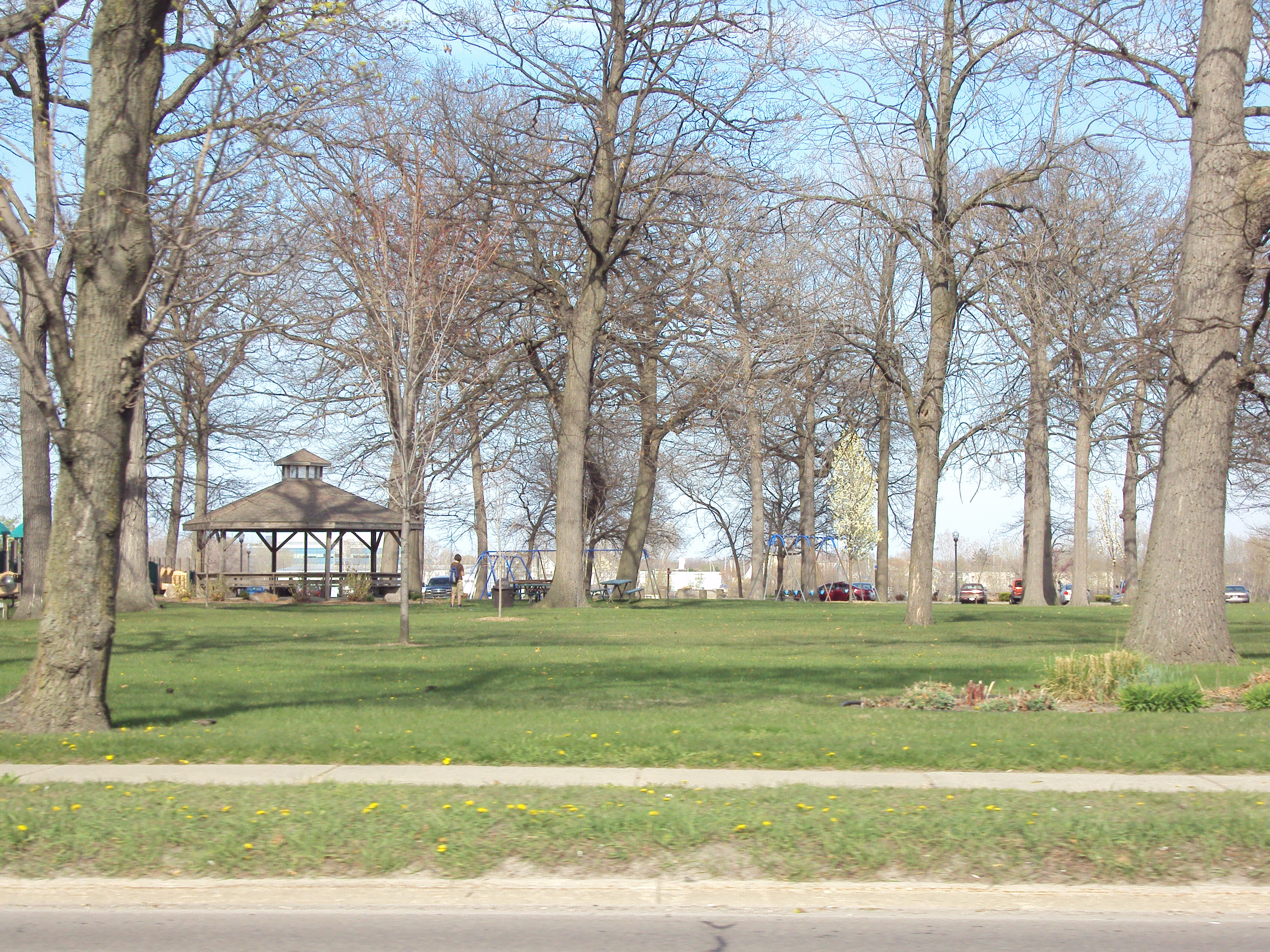
- Pine Grove Park, 2012 - the southern section of Fort Gratiot

- Location within Michigan Location within the United States
- Interactive map
- Location: Along Thomas Edison Parkway, Port Huron, Michigan
- Coordinates: 42°59′42″N 82°25′41″W
- Area: 7.5 acres (3.0 ha)
- Built: 1814
- NRHP reference No.: 80004069
- Added to NRHP: April 14, 1980

Fort Gratiot /ˈɡræʃɪt/ was an American stockade fort in Fort Gratiot, Michigan, in Saint Clair County, Michigan. The former location of the fort was listed on the National Register of Historic Places in 1980.

== History ==
The Army constructed Fort Gratiot in 1814 as an outpost to guard the juncture of the Saint Clair River and Lake Huron. The fort took the name of the engineer supervising its construction, Charles Gratiot. Soldiers occupied Fort Gratiot until 1822 and then abandoned the fort. Lucius Lyon built Fort Gratiot Light north of Fort Gratiot in 1825–1829.

The Army then returned from 1828, and rebuilt the fort to a somewhat smaller size than the original, also building some timber-framed structures on the site, including a hospital and officer's quarters. The site was used intermittently until 1879.

The Army abandoned Fort Gratiot in 1879. It was not entirely shut down until 1895.

Pine Grove Park occupies part of the fort site. The timber-framed hospital and officers quarters were moved multiple times within the fort, finally being placed in the western section, along what is now St. Claire Street. In the 1980s, archaeological work determined the age of the structures, and in 2000–02, the Port Huron Museum acquired both homes and moved them to a lot in Lighthouse Park, where the Fort Gratiot Lighthouse is located. Restoration occurred from 2012 to 2024 with a Grand Opening ceremony in August.

== Description ==
The original fort was constructed entirely of wood. Logs formed the base, with piled earth and upright timbers forming a stockade. The fort was approximately 165 wide feet by 495 feet long. It likely had a two-story blockhouse.

== Gallery ==
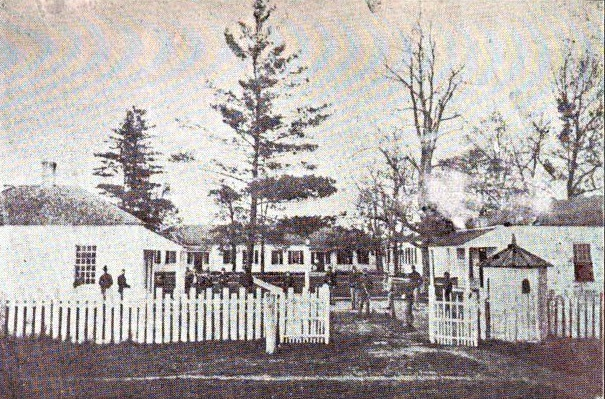
Entrance to Fort Gratiot, residence square

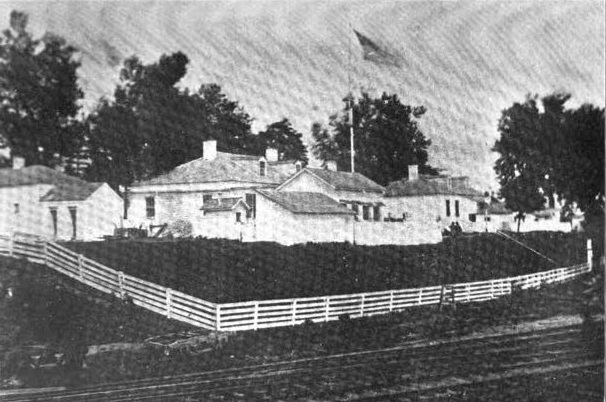
Fort Gratiot from the northwest

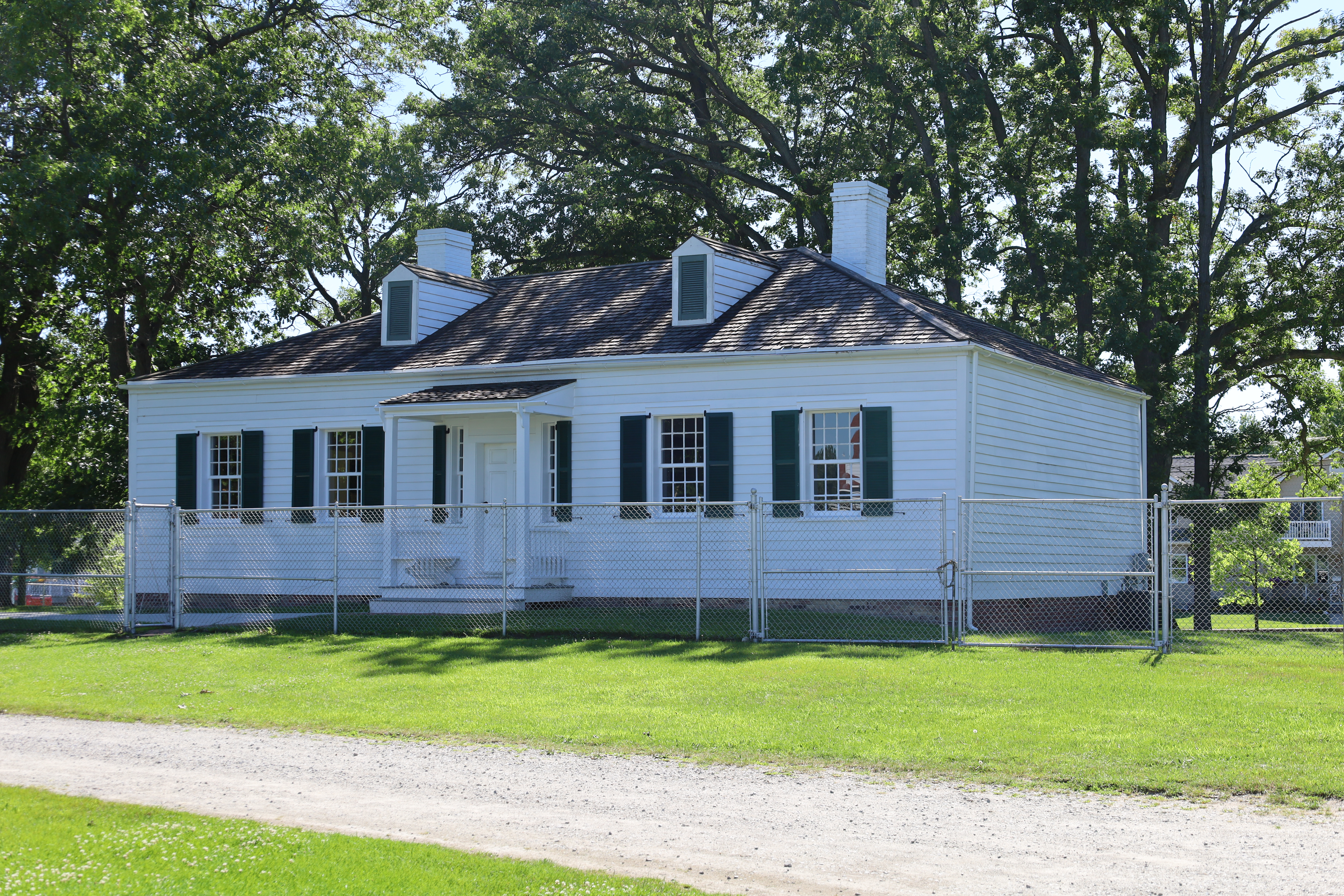
Fort Gratiot Hospital, now located in Lighthouse Park
