= St. Clair, Michigan =

- City
- city of St. Clair
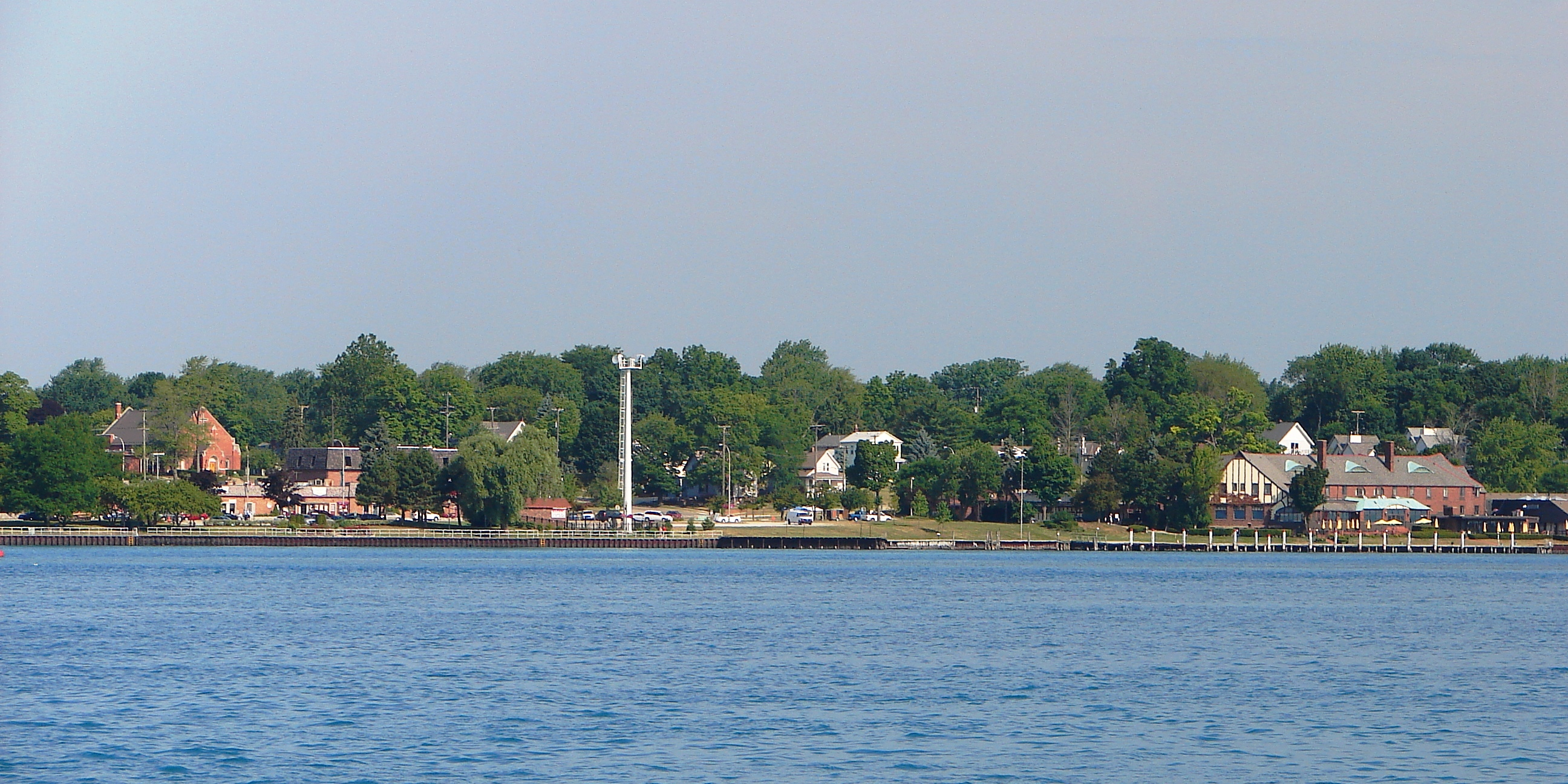
- View from across the St. Clair River

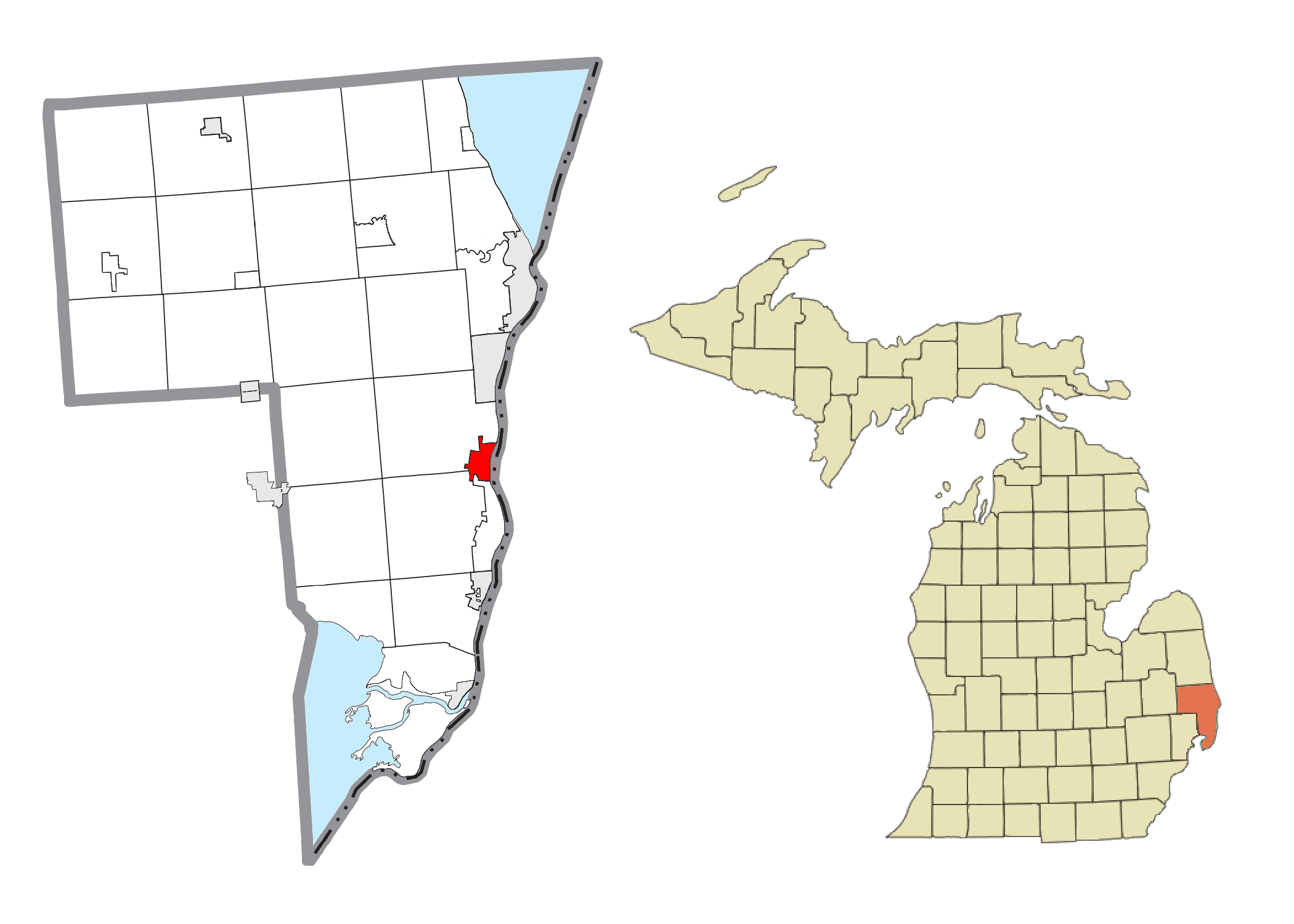
- Location within St. Clair County

- Location within the state of Michigan Location within the United States
- Coordinates: 42°49′23″N 82°29′32″W
- Country: United States
- State: Michigan
- County: St. Clair
- Settled: 1818
- Incorporated: 1850 (village); 1858 (city)

Government
  - Type: Council–manager
  - Mayor: Bill Cedar
  - Clerk: Annette Sturdy

Area
  - Total: 3.62 sq mi (9.37 km^{2})
  - Land: 2.94 sq mi (7.61 km^{2})
  - Water: 0.68 sq mi (1.75 km^{2})
- Elevation: 584 ft (178 m)

Population (2020)
  - Total: 5,464
  - Density: 1,858.7/sq mi (717.64/km^{2})
- Time zone: UTC-5 (Eastern (EST))
  - Summer (DST): UTC-4 (EDT)
- ZIP code(s): 48079
- Area code: 810
- FIPS code: 26-70680
- GNIS feature ID: 1624881
- Website: Official website

St. Clair is a city in St. Clair County in the eastern "Thumb" of the U.S. state of Michigan. As of the 2020 census, St. Clair had a population of 5,464. The city is located on the St. Clair River near the southeast corner of St. Clair Township .

== Geography ==
- According to the United States Census Bureau, the city has a total area of 3.61 square miles (9.35 km^{2}), of which 2.93 square miles (7.59 km^{2}) is land and 0.68 square miles (1.76 km^{2}) is water. The city is located along the St. Clair River.
- It lies in the Thumb of Michigan.
  - Saint Clair can also be considered as in the Blue Water area, a subregion of the Thumb.
- The City of St. Clair has much upscale housing along the St. Clair River. The Saint Clair area attracts many tourists from Metro Detroit.

== Naming ==
Located on the western banks of the St. Clair River, the city's name is taken from the river. It was named for Lake Saint Clair, named by French explorers in the 17th century. The expedition of French explorer René Robert Cavelier, Sieur de La Salle entered the lake on August 12, 1679, the feast day of Saint Clare of Assisi, and named it Lac Sainte-Claire in her honor.

On English maps as early as 1710, the lake is labelled as Saint Clare (the latter the French spelling). The spelling was anglicized as early as the 1755 Mitchell Map, when the lake's name was spelled as "St. Clair," as it is currently.

The name is sometimes attributed to honoring the American Revolutionary War General Arthur St. Clair, who was President of the United States in Continental Congress during the drafting of the United States Constitution, and Governor of the Northwest Territory, but the name was in use with the current spelling long before St. Clair was a notable figure. The earlier name of the lake may have been conflated with that of the general when officials were later naming some of the political entities near the lake and the river, such as St. Clair County, St. Clair Township, and the cities of St. Clair and St. Clair Shores.

Some have thought that the name was in honor of Patrick Sinclair, a British officer who purchased land on the St. Clair River at the outlet of the Pine River. There in 1764 he built Fort Sinclair, which was in use for nearly twenty years before being abandoned.

== History ==
St. Clair was originally the site of a Fort, called Fort Sinclair, and was an Indigenous trading post. The oldest standing house is actually part of the fort, but is owned by Johnson Hydraulics. The fort existed in the mid 18th century, when the St, Clair River was used for traveling by explorers, traders, and early settlers. St. Clair was first platted under the name of Palmer by Thomas Palmer in 1828. The city of St. Clair's roots go back to 1764, when a British fort was built on the south side of the Pine River near where it flows into the St. Clair River. Pontiac's Rebellion had taken place the year before and the British wanted a military base on the St. Clair River to protect their shipping route between Detroit and Fort Michilimackinac. Col. Patrick Sinclair was given the task of building it. He also made the new Fort Sinclair a trading post and sawmill center. The fort and the trading post both operated for about twenty years.

In 1817, Robert Fulton platted a town on the north side of the Pine River. He lobbied for the creation of St. Clair County, and then convinced the state to make his settlement the new county seat. St. Clair remained the county seat until 1871, when it was moved to Port Huron.

Thomas Palmer of Detroit bought Fulton's mostly undeveloped town in 1826, and for a time the village was called Palmer. The sawmill industry began to flourish due to the area's large supply of pine and oak. Clay from the Pine River's banks provided the material for several brickyards that operated into the Twentieth Century. Shipbuilding began in the 1820s and continued for a hundred years. Many of the town's men became sailors on the Great Lakes and numerous captains built homes in the city. In 1887, the Diamond Crystal Salt Company began tapping the area's vast underground salt deposits.

In the late 1800s, St. Clair became a well-known resort with the building of the luxurious Oakland Hotel in 1881 and the Somerville Hotel in 1888. In addition to the natural wonders of the area, both hotels offered mineral baths. Passenger steamers stopped daily at the hotel docks.

In the 1960s, the downtown area was redeveloped with the help of the U.S. Department of Housing and Urban Development. The crown jewel of the project was the expansion of Palmer Park with its boardwalk along the St. Clair River.

== Demographics ==
Historical population
Census	Pop.	Note	%±
1860	1,530		—
1870	1,790		17.0%
1880	1,923		7.4%
1890	2,353		22.4%
1900	2,543		8.1%
1910	2,633		3.5%
1920	3,204		21.7%
1930	3,389		5.8%
1940	3,471		2.4%
1950	4,098		18.1%
1960	4,538		10.7%
1970	4,770		5.1%
1980	4,780		0.2%
1990	5,116		7.0%
2000	5,802		13.4%
2010	5,485		−5.5%
2020	5,464		−0.4%
U.S. Decennial Census

=== 2020 census ===
As of the 2020 census, St. Clair had a population of 5,464. The median age was 44.7 years. 20.8% of residents were under the age of 18 and 20.2% of residents were 65 years of age or older. For every 100 females there were 95.8 males, and for every 100 females age 18 and over there were 90.6 males age 18 and over.

Racial composition as of the 2020 census
Race	Number	Percent
White	5,052	92.5%
Black or African American	42	0.8%
American Indian and Alaska Native	11	0.2%
Asian	38	0.7%
Native Hawaiian and Other Pacific Islander	0	0.0%
Some other race	42	0.8%
Two or more races	279	5.1%
Hispanic or Latino (of any race)	133	2.4%

99.8% of residents lived in urban areas, while 0.2% lived in rural areas.

There were 2,409 households in St. Clair, of which 24.8% had children under the age of 18 living in them. Of all households, 44.6% were married-couple households, 19.6% were households with a male householder and no spouse or partner present, and 29.6% were households with a female householder and no spouse or partner present. About 34.4% of all households were made up of individuals and 15.3% had someone living alone who was 65 years of age or older.

There were 2,554 housing units, of which 5.7% were vacant. The homeowner vacancy rate was 1.2% and the rental vacancy rate was 4.5%.

=== 2010 census ===
As of the census of 2010, there were 5,485 people, 2,306 households, and 1,521 families residing in the city. The population density was 1,872.0 inhabitants per square mile (722.8/km^{2}). There were 2,523 housing units at an average density of 861.1 per square mile (332.5/km^{2}). The racial makeup of the city was 97.1% White, 0.3% African American, 0.2% Native American, 0.9% Asian, 0.3% from other races, and 1.2% from two or more races. Hispanic or Latino of any race were 1.6% of the population.

There were 2,306 households, of which 30.3% had children under the age of 18 living with them, 51.1% were married couples living together, 10.8% had a female householder with no husband present, 4.0% had a male householder with no wife present, and 34.0% were non-families. 30.1% of all households were made up of individuals, and 11.2% had someone living alone who was 65 years of age or older. The average household size was 2.37 and the average family size was 2.95.

The median age in the city was 42.5 years. 23.9% of residents were under the age of 18; 7.1% were between the ages of 18 and 24; 22.8% were from 25 to 44; 30.9% were from 45 to 64; and 15.2% were 65 years of age or older. The gender makeup of the city was 48.3% male and 51.7% female.

=== 2000 census ===
As of the census of 2000, there were 5,802 people, 2,322 households, and 1,613 families residing in the city. The population density was 2,093.7 inhabitants per square mile (808.4/km^{2}). There were 2,432 housing units at an average density of 877.6 per square mile (338.8/km^{2}). The racial makeup of the city was 96.4% White, 0.12% African American, 0.6% Native American, 0.86% Asian, 1.00% Pacific Islander, 0.14% from other races, and 1.3% from two or more races. Hispanic or Latino of any race were 1.2% of the population.

There were 2,322 households, out of which 34.6% had children under the age of 18 living with them, 56.7% were married couples living together, 9.6% had a female householder with no husband present, and 30.5% were non-families. 27.3% of all households were made up of individuals, and 13.1% had someone living alone who was 65 years of age or older. The average household size was 2.49 and the average family size was 3.05.

In the city, the population was spread out, with 27.3% under the age of 18, 6.9% from 18 to 24, 29.0% from 25 to 44, 22.3% from 45 to 64, and 14.5% who were 65 years of age or older. The median age was 37 years. For every 100 females, there were 88.4 males. For every 100 females age 18 and over, there were 86.8 males.

The median income for a household in the city was $52,957, and the median income for a family was $61,743. Males had a median income of $50,509 versus $28,224 for females. The per capita income for the city was $25,180. About 3.3% of families and 4.1% of the population were below the poverty line, including 4.6% of those under age 18 and 3.1% of those age 65 or over.

== Recurring local events ==
- Blue Water Ramble (St. Clair, Michigan) Annual International Bicycling Event, first weekend in October.
- Annual St. Clair Art Fair is a two-day event in the last weekend in June.
- St. Clair Boat Races and River Fest are held annually in downtown St. Clair on the last weekend of July.
- Will on the Water Shakespeare Festival, second weekend in August.

== Industry ==
- Cargill Salt (formerly Diamond Crystal) operates a large solution salt mine and evaporation facility in St. Clair. This is the only plant in the United States that produces Alberger salt, which is especially prized in the fast food industry because of its higher volume (due to its unique shape) and lower sodium content (for a given volume, not weight). This is part of Michigan's large salt-mining industry.
- The St. Clair Power Plant and Belle River Power Plant are important industries to the area, although they are not within the city limits. Both plants are located a few miles south along the St. Clair River.
