= Harrington Hotel =

- U.S. National Register of Historic Places
- Michigan State Historic Site
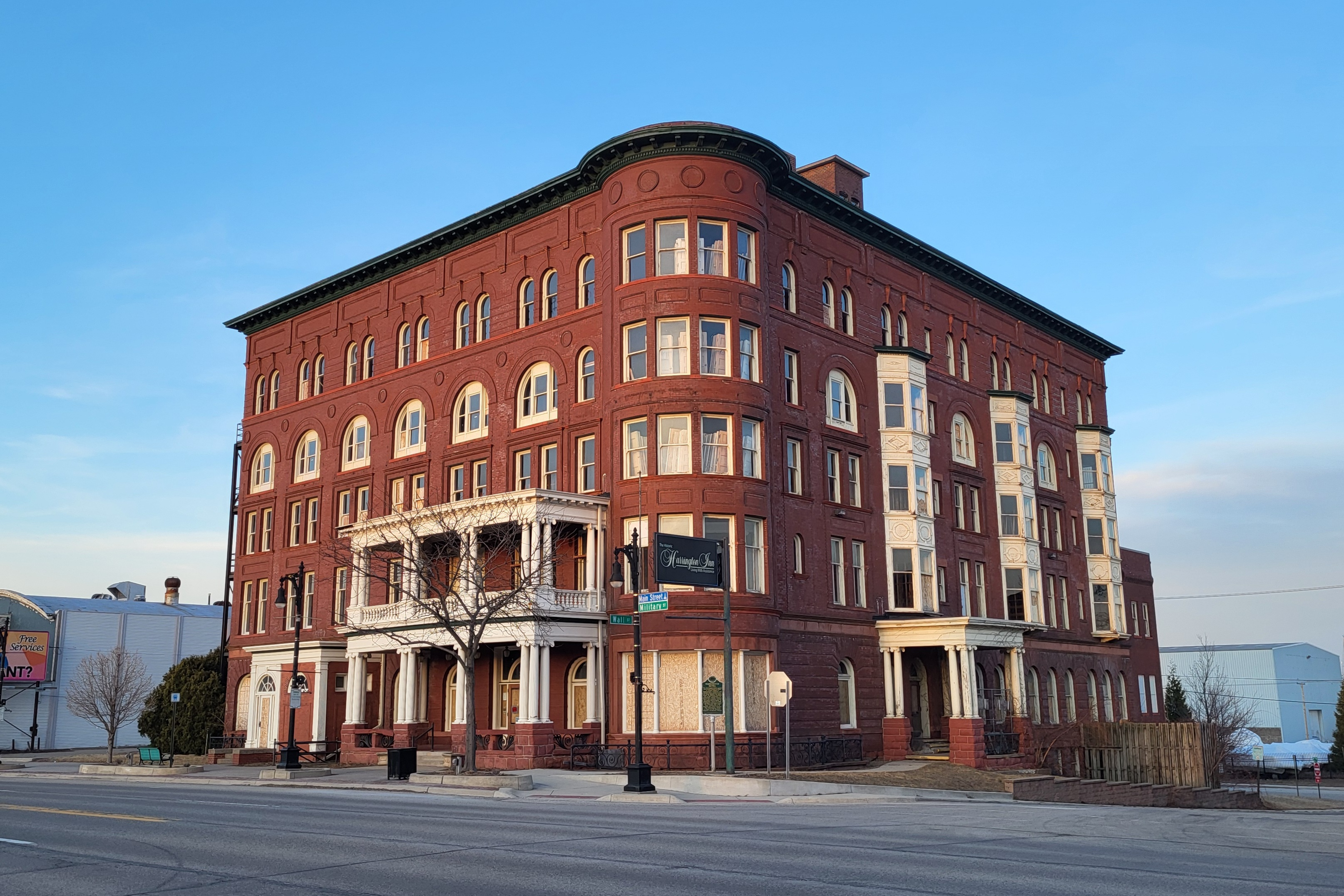
- Closed and shuttered hotel in March 2025

- Location within Michigan Location within the United States
- Interactive map
- Location: 1026 Military Street, Port Huron, Michigan
- Coordinates: 42°58′22″N 82°25′28″W
- Area: less than one acre
- Built: 1896
- Architectural style: Classical Revival, Richardsonian Romanesque
- NRHP reference No.: 82004468
- Added to NRHP: April 22, 1982

The Harrington Hotel, also known as the Harrington Inn, is a hotel located at 1026 Military Street in Port Huron, Michigan. It was listed on the National Register of Historic Places in 1982.

== History ==
Charles Harrington was a prominent attorney and investor who was born in Port Huron in 1842. At that time, his family's home and property were located at the site now occupied by the Harrington Hotel. In 1896, Harrington had this hotel constructed on the same site. The hotel became the center of social and political life in Port Huron, and hosted such dignitaries as Secretary of War William Gibbs McAdoo, Michigan Governor John T. Rich, actor Otis Skinner, comedian Eddie Foy Sr., boxer Robert Fitzsimmons, actor Robert B. Mantell, and Thomas Edison. In 1919, Harry S Truman and his wife Bess spent their honeymoon at the Harrington Hotel.

Harrington managed the hotel until 1923. IN 1940, the movie Young Tom Edison premiered in Port Huron, and a number of famous guests stayed at the Harrington, including Mickey Rooney, Louis B. Mayer, Harvey S. Firestone Jr., Edsel Ford, and Father Edward J. Flanagan, founder of Boys Town. However, the hotel experienced financial difficulties in the 1950s and into the 1960s. By the early 1980s, half the rooms were being rented on a weekly or monthly basis. Threatened with demolition, the hotel was converted into the "Harrington Inn," an assisted living center for seniors. The Inn closed in 2017.

== Description ==
The Harrington Hotel is a five-story, red brick building located on a corner lot. The design contains elements of Richardsonian Romanesque style, such as a tri-part facade and deeply set round arched windows, and elements of Classical Revival style, such as detailed wooden porches and panel friezes. The two main facades have a symmetrical window positioning, with a single story base section containing large round arched windows in the Military Street facade and smaller windows, placed in groups of three, in the Wall Street facade. The second and third stories contain double-hung windows, and the fourth floor section has large round arched openings each containing a door flanked by windows. The fifth floor section contains small, round arched windows in pairs.

The Wall Street facade includes three windows spanning the second floor level to the fourth. A balustrade originally ran along the top of the building, and metal originally were set into the fourth floor level. The main entrance opens west onto Military Street, and is sheltered by a frame porch with two tiers, composed of Ionic columns with a frieze and balustrade above. A second entrance on the Wall Street side is sheltered by a similar one story portico. A small single story 1930 coffee shop addition extends in front of the Military Street facade, and a 2-1/2 story brick wing at the rear, original to the hotel, contains the kitchen and mechanical rooms.
