= Michigan's 32nd House of Representatives district =

American legislative district

Michigan's 32nd State House of Representatives district
Representative
Jimmie Wilson Jr. D–Ypsilanti
- Demographics: 51% White; 28.6% Black; 8% Hispanic; 4.3% Asian; 0.2% Native American; 0.1% Hawaiian/Pacific Islander; 0.6% Other; 7.2% Multiracial
- Population (2024): 90,492

Michigan's 32nd House of Representatives district is a legislative district within the Michigan House of Representatives located in Washtenaw County. The district was created in 1965, when the Michigan Supreme Court ordered the reapportionment of state legislative districts from a county-based system to a proportional one following the Supreme Court case Reynolds v. Sims. It is currently represented by Democrat Jimmie Wilson Jr. of Ypsilanti.

== List of representatives ==
Representative	Party	Years	Residence	Notes
William H. Thorne	Democratic	1965–1966	Dearborn Heights	Reapportioned from the former Wayne County, 19th district.
Alex Pilch	Democratic	1967–1972	Dearborn	
Richard Arthur Young	Democratic	1973–1992	Dearborn Heights	Redistricted from the 33rd district; redistricted to the 16th district.
David Jaye	Republican	1993–1997	Shelby Township (until around 1996); Washington Township	Redistricted from the 26th district; resigned November 1997 after being elected to the Michigan Senate.
Alan Bruce Sanborn	Republican	1998 (Note: Elected in a 1998 special election to replace Rep. David Jaye, who resigned.)–2001	Richmond	Resigned November 2001 after being elected to the Michigan Senate.
Brian P. Palmer	Republican	2002 (Note: Elected in a 2002 special election to replace Rep. Alan Bruce Sanborn, who resigned.)	Romeo	Redistricted to the 36th district.
Daniel Joseph Acciavatti	Republican	2003–2008	Chesterfield Township	Term limited.
Jennifer Haase	Democratic	2009–2010	Richmond	
Andrea LaFontaine	Republican	2011–2016	Richmond (until around 2012); Columbus Township (until around 2014); Memphis	Term limited.
Pamela Hornberger	Republican	2017–2022	Chesterfield Township	Term limited.
Jimmie Wilson Jr.	Democratic	2023–present	Ypsilanti	

== Historical district boundaries ==
Map	Description	Apportionment Plan	Notes
	Wayne County (part): Dearborn (part); Dearborn Heights (part); Inkster (part)	1964 Apportionment Plan (Note: Referred to as the Austin-Kleiner plan.)	
	Wayne County (part): Dearborn Heights (part); Taylor (part)	1972 Apportionment Plan (Note: Referred to as the Hatcher-Kleiner plan.)	
	Wayne County (part): Allen Park (part); Dearborn Heights	1982 Apportionment Plan	
	Macomb County (part): Armada Township; Bruce Township; Memphis; Ray Township; Richmond; Richmond Township; Shelby Township; Utica; Washington Township	1992 Apportionment Plan	
	Macomb County (part): Armada Township; Chesterfield Township; Lenox Township; Memphis (part); New Baltimore; Richmond (part); Richmond Township; St. Clair County (part): Columbus Township; Ira Township; Kimball Township; Wales Township	2001 Apportionment Plan	
	Macomb County (part): Chesterfield Township; New Baltimore; St. Clair County (part): Casco Township; Columbus Township; Ira Township; Kenockee Township; Kimball Township; Memphis (part); Richmond (part); Riley Township; Wales Township	2011 Apportionment Plan	
	Washtenaw County (part): Pittsfield Charter Township (part); Superior Township (part); Ypsilanti; Ypsilanti Township	2021 Apportionment Plan (Note: Referred to as the Hickory plan.)	

== Recent elections ==
=== 2020s ===
2026 Michigan House of Representatives election
Party	Candidate	Votes	%
Democratic	Jimmie Wilson Jr. (incumbent)	32,886	80.77
Republican	Mike Eller	7,028	17.26
Green	Ryan Sample	479	1.18
U.S. Taxpayers'	John R. Tatar	321	0.79
Total votes		40,714	100
Democratic hold			

2024 Michigan House of Representatives election
Party	Candidate	Votes	%
Democratic	Jimmie Wilson Jr. (incumbent)	34,004	75.08
Republican	Martin A. Church	9,767	21.56
Green	Ryan Sample	1,521	3.36
Total votes		45,292	100
Democratic hold			

2022 Michigan House of Representatives election
Party	Candidate	Votes	%
Democratic	Jimmie Wilson Jr.	28,211	79.28
Republican	Martin A. Church	7,375	20.72
Total votes		35,586	100
Democratic gain from Republican			

2020 Michigan House of Representatives election
Party	Candidate	Votes	%
Republican	Pamela Hornberger (incumbent)	33,393	66.15
Democratic	Justin Boucher	17,090	33.85
Total votes		50,483	100
Republican hold			

=== 2010s ===
2018 Michigan House of Representatives election
Party	Candidate	Votes	%
Republican	Pamela Hornberger (incumbent)	22,092	61.48
Democratic	Paul Manley	13,840	38.52
Total votes		35,932	100
Republican hold			

2016 Michigan House of Representatives election
Party	Candidate	Votes	%
Republican	Pamela Hornberger	25,629	63.66
Democratic	Paul Manley	14,631	36.34
Total votes		40,260	100
Republican hold			

2014 Michigan House of Representatives election
Party	Candidate	Votes	%
Republican	Andrea LaFontaine (incumbent)	16,218	62.06
Democratic	Pamela Kraft	9,915	37.94
Total votes		26,133	100
Republican hold			

2012 Michigan House of Representatives election
Party	Candidate	Votes	%
Republican	Andrea LaFontaine (incumbent)	22,842	58.62
Democratic	Sheri Smith	16,122	41.38
Total votes		38,964	100
Republican hold			

2010 Michigan House of Representatives election
Party	Candidate	Votes	%
Republican	Andrea LaFontaine	16,101	50.6
Democratic	Jennifer Haase (incumbent)	14,354	45.11
Libertarian	Scott Dudek	1,367	4.3
Total votes		31,822	100
Republican gain from Democratic			

=== 2000s ===
2008 Michigan House of Representatives election
Party	Candidate	Votes	%
Democratic	Jennifer Haase	24,123	50.42
Republican	John Accavitti	22,455	46.93
Libertarian	Joseph L. Zemens	1,265	2.64
Total votes		47,843	100
Democratic gain from Republican			

2006 Michigan House of Representatives election
Party	Candidate	Votes	%
Republican	Daniel J. Acciavatti (incumbent)	21,217	59.02
Democratic	Jill Lezotte	13,847	38.52
Libertarian	Joseph L. Zemens	886	2.46
Total votes		35,950	100
Republican hold			

2004 Michigan House of Representatives election
Party	Candidate	Votes	%
Republican	Daniel J. Acciavatti (incumbent)	28,988	65.7
Democratic	Michael R. Landsiedel	14,131	32.02
Libertarian	Joseph L. Zemens	1,006	2.28
Total votes		44,125	100
Republican hold			

2002 Michigan House of Representatives election
Party	Candidate	Votes	%
Republican	Daniel J. Acciavatti	15,405	56.26
Democratic	John J. Hertel	11,975	43.74
Total votes		27,380	100
Republican hold			

2000 Michigan House of Representatives election
Party	Candidate	Votes	%
Republican	Alan Sanborn (incumbent)	32,162	66.59
Democratic	Greg Moore	14,852	30.75
Libertarian	Bob Van Oast	1,286	2.66
Total votes		48,300	100
Republican hold			

=== 1990s ===
1998 Michigan House of Representatives election
Party	Candidate	Votes	%
Republican	Alan Sanborn (incumbent)	24,700	73.82
Democratic	Aristidis Andreopoulos	7,593	22.69
Libertarian	Bob Van Oast	1,169	3.49
Total votes		33,462	100
Republican hold			
