= Jennifer Haase =

American politician (born 1974)

Member of the Michigan House of Representatives from the 32nd district
- In office January 1, 2009 – December 31, 2010
- Preceded by: Dan Acciavatti
- Succeeded by: Andrea LaFontaine

Personal details
- Born: December 20, 1974 (age 51) Detroit, Michigan
- Party: Democratic
- Spouse: Robert Haase
- Profession: Elementary School Teacher, Politician

Jennifer Haase (born December 20, 1974) is an American teacher and politician from the state of Michigan. A Democrat, she was elected to the Michigan State House of Representatives in 2008, representing the 32nd State House District. It includes portions of North and East Macomb County and four rural townships in St. Clair County, and had a history of voting Republican. Prior to her election, Haase worked as an elementary school teacher in Richmond.

== Biography ==
Jennifer Haase was born on December 20, 1974, in Detroit, Michigan. She graduated from Eisenhower High School, in Shelby Township, Michigan in 1993. She graduated from Alma College in Alma, Michigan with a BA in Elementary Education in 1997. In 1998 she began working as an elementary school teacher in Warren. She also taught in California.

In 2007, Haase completed graduate work, receiving her Masters of Education, Reading and Language Arts from Oakland University. Later that year she became more active in politics, and ran in 2008 for state representative from the 32nd House District of Michigan. Haase worked as an elementary school teacher from 1998 to her election in 2008. She lives in Richmond with her husband Robert Haase, a Sterling Heights firefighter and paramedic.

== Political career ==
In March 2008, Jennifer Haase filed to run for the 32nd State House District of Michigan. The 32nd District is divided between exurban Macomb County and rural St. Clair County. It includes the Macomb County municipalities of Armada, Chesterfield, Lenox, and Richmond Townships, as well as the cities of Richmond, Memphis and New Baltimore. In St. Clair County, the 32nd encompasses Columbus, Ira, Kimball, and Wales Townships.

The seat was being vacated by Republican incumbent Daniel J. Acciavatti, who was barred by term limits from running for re-election. Haase was unopposed in the Democratic Primary, while the Republican Primary featured four candidates. Republican John Accavitti won the Republican Primary and faced Haase in the General Election. Although the 32nd was historically safe Republican territory, the strong national Democratic presidential candidates made the race between Haase and Accavitti competitive.

Haase defeated Accavitti in what was considered an upset. She won by a 50.4%-46.9% margin. Democrat Barack Obama won the District over Republican John McCain by a narrow 49.5%-48.6% margin, and won the presidency. The 32nd District was one of nine seats that Democrats picked up from Republicans in the 2008 election, bringing their margin in the State House to 66-44. Haase took office on January 1, 2009. She sat on the Agriculture, Health Policy, Education, and Ethics and Elections Committees.

In midterm elections, Haase lost her re-election bid in 2010 to Republican Andrea LaFontaine.

== Electoral history ==
- 2008 campaign for State House
  - Jennifer Haase (D), 50.4%
  - John Accavitti (R), 46.9%
- 2010 campaign for State House
  - Andrea LaFontaine (R), 16,101 votes
  - Jennifer Haase (D), 14,354 votes
