= Memphis Community Schools =

School district in Michigan

Address
- 34110 Bordman Road Memphis, St. Clair County, Michigan, 48041; United States

District information
- Grades: PreKindergarten–12
- Superintendent: Sara Dobbelaer
- Schools: 2
- Budget: $12,519,000 2022-2023 expenditures
- NCES District ID: 2623490

Students and staff
- Students: 710 (2024-2025)
- Teachers: 49.05 (on an FTE basis) (2024-2025)
- Staff: 188.19 FTE (2024-2025)
- Student–teacher ratio: 14.48 (2024-2025)

Other information
- Website: www.memphisk12.org

Memphis Community Schools is a public school district in St. Clair County, Michigan. It serves Memphis and parts of the townships of Columbus, Kenockee, Kimball, Riley, and Wales. It also serves parts of Richmond Township in Macomb County.

== History ==
According to a history published in the 1976 Memphis High School yearbook, a school was established in Memphis in 1844 inside an existing building. Five years later, a separate school district was organized in Riley Township. These districts united in 1863 to form a union school district, and in 1867 it built a two-story school with four classrooms. A high school was established within the building by 1880, but it did not go to grade twelve until 1898. A new school was built in 1913 with the modern new amenities of the time, "electric lights and heated indoor bathrooms."

Ground was broken for Memphis Elementary on May 10, 1955. A junior/senior high school, dedicated in 1967, was built as an addition to it. It was designed by Valentine & Associates of Marysville, Michigan.

The current Memphis Junior/Senior High School opened in fall 2001. The former junior/senior high became a dedicated elementary school. The 1913 high school, at 3150 Potter Street, is currently an apartment building.

== Schools ==
Schools in Memphis Community Schools
School	Address	Notes
Memphis Junior/Senior High School	34130 Bordman, Memphis	Grades 6–12. Built 2001.
Memphis Elementary	34165 Bordman, Memphis	Grades PreK-5
