= Richmond Community Schools =

Public school district

Address
- 35276 Division Road Richmond, Macomb County, Michigan, 48062; United States

District information
- Grades: Pre-Kindergarten-12
- Superintendent: Brian Walmsley
- Schools: 3
- Budget: $26,985,000 2022-2023 expenditures
- NCES District ID: 2629670

Students and staff
- Students: 1,558 (2024-2025)
- Teachers: 95.63 (on an FTE basis) (2024-2025)
- Staff: 223.12 FTE (2024-2025)
- Student–teacher ratio: 16.29 (2024-2025)

Other information
- Website: www.richmond.k12.mi.us

Richmond Community Schools is a public school district in Macomb County, Michigan. It serves Richmond and parts of the townships of Lenox and Richmond. It also serves parts of Casco Township and Columbus Township in St. Clair County.

== History ==
The first school in Richmond was established in 1838 in a private home. Logs were used to build a dedicated schoolhouse the next year. In 1875, a brick school was built, a year after Richmond's public school district was established.

The previous high school was located on Park Street. The two story building with a central cupola was dedicated on the evening of Labor Day in 1913. The current high school opened in February 1960 after being christened with a Christmas concert in December, 1959.

Voters approved funds for a new middle school around 1973. The building was complete by early 1976, but the project was over budget due to inflation and voters would not approve additional funds to equip the building. Fall 1976 came and went as the building remained empty, and funding was finally approved in March 1977 for a fall opening.

== Schools ==
Richmond's schools share a campus south of downtown Richmond.

Schools in Richmond Community Schools district
School	Address	Notes
Richmond High School	35276 Division Road, Richmond	Grades 9-12. Built 1960.
Richmond Middle School	35250 Division Road, Richmond	Grades 4-8. Built 1976.
Will L. Lee Elementary School	68399 South Forest Ave, Richmond	Grades K-3
Early Learning Childhood Center	68399 South Forest, Richmond	Preschool
