= Andrea LaFontaine =

American politician (born 1987)

Member of the Michigan House of Representatives from the 32nd district
- In office January 1, 2011 – December 31, 2016
- Preceded by: Jennifer Haase
- Succeeded by: Pamela Hornberger

Personal details
- Born: March 6, 1987 (age 39) New Baltimore, Michigan, U.S.
- Party: Republican
- Education: Central Michigan University (2009)
- Occupation: Parks Commissioner, Trails Specialist, Trails Ambassador

Andrea LaFontaine (born 1987) is an American parks commissioner, trails specialist and trails ambassador. LaFontaine is a former politician from the state of Michigan. A Republican, LaFontaine was elected to the Michigan State House of Representatives in 2010, representing the 32nd State House District.

== Early life ==
On March 6, 1987, LaFontaine was born in New Baltimore, Michigan.

Circa 1995, she moved to Richmond Township, Macomb County, Michigan, and graduated from Richmond High School in 2005.

== Education ==
In 2009, LaFontaine received a Bachelor's degree in Political Science from Central Michigan University. In 2011, LaFontain completed a Master of Public Administration from Central Michigan University.

== Career ==
For nearly a decade, LaFontaine worked as a waitress at Ken's Country Kitchen in Richmond.

In 2009, LaFontaine's political career started when she became the legislative assistant for Senator Alan Sanborn.

LaFontaine narrowly won against four opponents in the Republican Party Primary election in August 2010. She defeated Democratic Party incumbent Jennifer Haase with 16,101 votes to 14,354 votes. Libertarian Party candidate Scott Dudek had 1,367 votes.

LaFontaine is pro-life and does not support abortion under any circumstances. She is pro-gun rights: a member of National Rifle Association of America (NRA) and Michigan Coalition for Responsible Gun Owners (MCRGO). She opposes taxes on businesses, advocating repeal of the Michigan Business Tax.

LaFontaine became a Commissioner for Oakland County Parks and a Trail Specialist for Michigan Department of Natural Resources. In 2018, LaFountaine became the Great Lake-to-Lake Trails Ambassador.

== Personal life ==
LaFountaine resides in Columbus Township, St. Clair County, Michigan.

== See also ==
- 2010 Michigan House of Representatives election
- 2012 Michigan House of Representatives election
- 2014 Michigan House of Representatives election
