= Lawrence Mills =

Lawrence Mills may refer to:

- Lawrence Paul Mills, American serial killer
- Lawrence Heyworth Mills, American orientalist and Iranologist
