= Casco Township, Michigan =

Casco Township is the name of some places in the U.S. state of Michigan:

- Casco Township, Allegan County, Michigan
- Casco Township, St. Clair County, Michigan
