= Frank Carr (American football) =

American administrator, commissioner, football coach, and men's golf coach (born c. 1956)

Current position
- Title: Assistant coach
- Team: National Trail HS (OH)

Biographical details
- Born: c. 1955 or 1956 (age 70–71); Royal Oak, Michigan, U.S.
- Education: Albion College (1978); Ball State University (1983)

Playing career

Football
- 1974–1977: Albion

Baseball
- 1975–1978: Albion
- Positions: Linebacker (football); Catcher (baseball)

Coaching career (HC unless noted)

Football
- 1978–1979: St. Mary of Redford HS (MI) (assistant)
- 1980: Dearborn HS (MI) (assistant)
- 1981: Earlham (assistant)
- 1982: Earlham (co-HC)
- 1983–1984: Earlham (DC)
- 1985–2001: Earlham
- 2017–present: National Trail HS (OH) (assistant)

Men's golf
- ?–1993: Earlham

Administrative career (AD unless noted)
- 1996–2002: Earlham (associate AD)
- 2002–2012: Earlham
- 2012–2014: Earlham (assistant AD)
- 2014–2017: Richmond HS (MI)
- 2017–2020: National Trail HS (OH)
- 2023–present: WOAC (commissioner)

Head coaching record
- Overall: 47–127 (football)

Accomplishments and honors

Awards
- Football; 3× All-MIAA (1975–1977); NCAC Coach of the Year (1994); Baseball; 2× All-MIAA (1977–1978)

Frank R. Carr (born c. 1955 or 1956) is an American college conference commissioner and high school football coach, former college football coach, and former athletic director. He is the commissioner for the Western Ohio Athletic Conference (WOAC) and is an assistant coach for National Trail High School. He was the head football coach for Earlham College in 1982 and from 1985 to 2001.

== Playing career ==
Carr played college football and baseball for Albion College. For the Albion Britons football team he was a three-time All-Michigan Intercollegiate Athletic Association (MIAA) selection as a linebacker from 1975 to 1977. For the Albion Britons baseball team he was a two-team All-MIAA selection as a catcher.

== Coaching career ==
Carr began his coaching career with St. Mary of Redford High School in 1978. He joined Dearborn High School in 1980. In 1981, he began his 21-year stint with Earlham College. He first joined as an assistant for his first season before becoming co-head football coach alongside Fred Cromie. The team finished the year 0–9. For the next two seasons he was the defensive coordinator under Ed Clemmer before being promoted to head football coach again in 1985. Over his eighteen-year career as head coach he finished with an overall record of 47–127. His best season came in 1994 as they finished the year with a 7–3 record and he was named North Coast Athletic Conference (NCAC) Coach of the Year. He resigned from coaching following the 2001 season. In 2017, Carr returned to coaching as an assistant for National Trail High School.

Carr was the head men's golf coach Earlham College which ended in the spring of 1993.

== Administrative career ==
In 1996, Carr became the associate athletic director for Earlham College. In 2002, following his resignation of his role as head football coach he became the full-time athletic director. In 2012, he took a lesser role as an assistant athletic director. In 2014, he was named athletic director for Richmond High School. He resigned on April 18, 2017. On June 7, 2017, Carr was named athletic director and dean of students for National Trail High School. In 2020 he resigned. On August 10, 2023, he was named commissioner of the Western Ohio Athletic Conference (WOAC).

Throughout Carr's entire career with Earlham College he served as a professor.

== Head coaching record ==
=== Football ===
| Year | Team | Overall | Conference | Standing | Bowl/playoffs |
|---|---|---|---|---|---|
Earlham Quakers (Hoosier–Buckeye Conference) (1982)
| 1982 | Earlham | 0–9 | 0–8 | 9th | |
Earlham Quakers (College Athletic Conference) (1985–1988)
| 1985 | Earlham | 0–9 | 0–4 | 5th | |
| 1986 | Earlham | 1–8 | 0–4 | 5th | |
| 1987 | Earlham | 3–6 | 1–3 | T–3rd | |
| 1988 | Earlham | 1–8 | 0–4 | 5th | |
Earlham Quakers (North Coast Athletic Conference) (1989–2001)
| 1989 | Earlham | 1–9 | 0–6 | 9th | |
| 1990 | Earlham | 2–8 | 1–6 | 8th | |
| 1991 | Earlham | 1–8 | 1–6 | 8th | |
| 1992 | Earlham | 5–5 | 2–5 | 8th | |
| 1993 | Earlham | 4–6 | 3–4 | 4th | |
| 1994 | Earlham | 7–3 | 5–3 | 4th | |
| 1995 | Earlham | 3–7 | 2–6 | 7th | |
| 1996 | Earlham | 3–7 | 2–6 | 8th | |
| 1997 | Earlham | 2–8 | 2–6 | 8th | |
| 1998 | Earlham | 2–8 | 2–6 | T–7th | |
| 1999 | Earlham | 2–8 | 1–6 | 6th | |
| 2000 | Earlham | 6–4 | 4–3 | T–3rd | |
| 2001 | Earlham | 4–6 | 3–4 | T–5th | |
| Earlham: | | 47–127 | 29–90 | | |
| Total: | | 47–127 | | | |
