= New Haven, Michigan =

- Village
- Motto: People Serving People
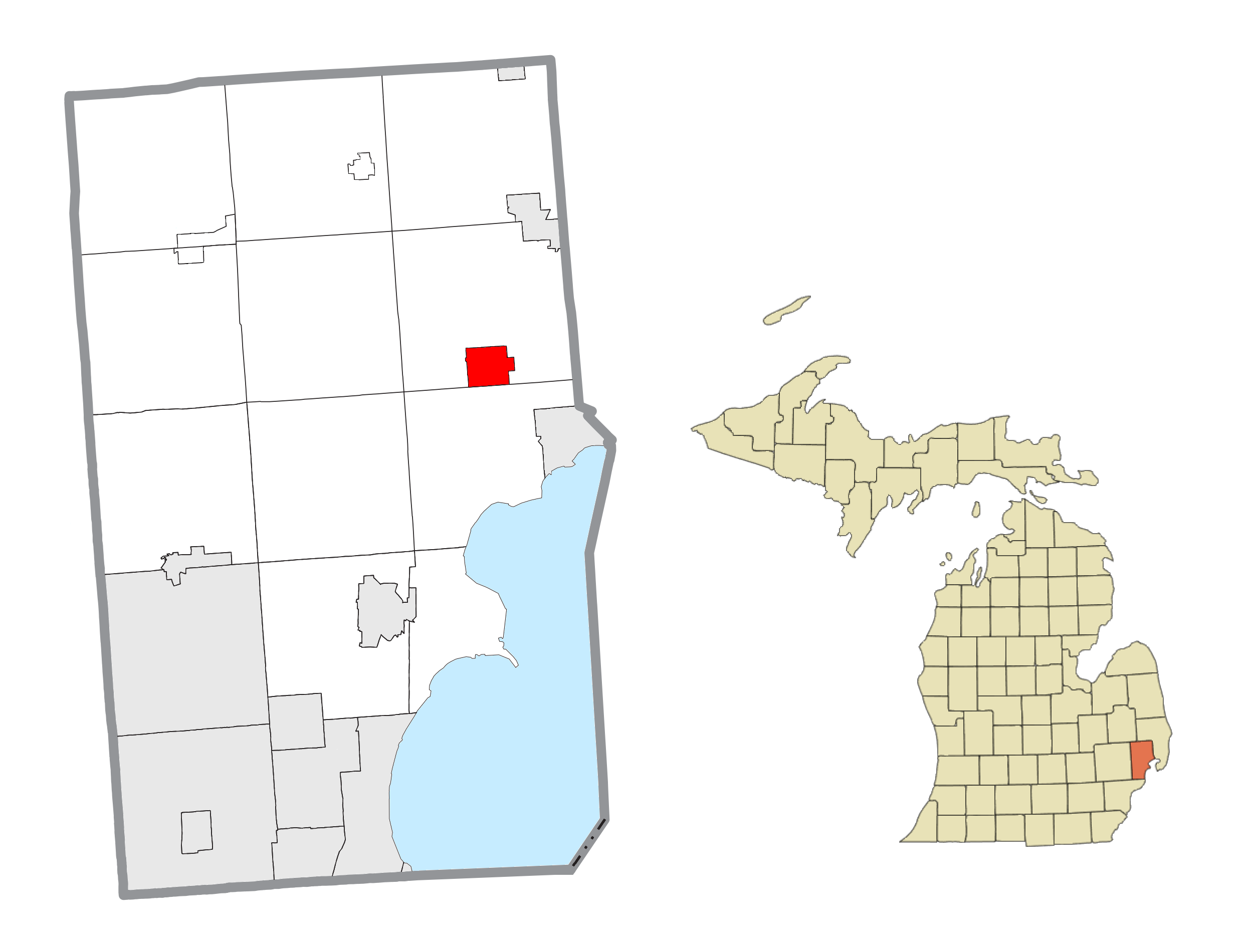
- Location within Macomb County

- Location within Michigan Location within the United States
- Coordinates: 42°43′57″N 82°47′38″W
- Country: United States
- State: Michigan
- County: Macomb
- Township: Lenox
- Incorporated: 1869 (village)

Government
  - Type: Village council
  - President: Brian Meissen

Area
  - Total: 2.53 sq mi (6.55 km^{2})
  - Land: 2.53 sq mi (6.55 km^{2})
  - Water: 0 sq mi (0.00 km^{2})
- Elevation: 627 ft (191 m)

Population (2020)
  - Total: 6,097
  - Density: 2,411.1/sq mi (930.92/km^{2})
- Time zone: UTC-5 (Eastern (EST))
  - Summer (DST): UTC-4 (EDT)
- ZIP Code: 48048
- Area code: 586
- FIPS code: 26-57380
- GNIS feature ID: 0633320
- Website: www.newhavenmi.org

New Haven is a village in Lenox Township within Macomb County in the U.S. state of Michigan. The population was 6,097 at the 2020 census, up from 4,642 in 2010.

== History ==
=== Origins and early history ===
The first settlers in the New Haven area were chiefly the Native Americans of the Ojibwa tribe. The Swan Creek Chippewa is a predominant segment of the tribe. French settlers came to the area in 1835 when the first land was purchased from the federal government.

The settlement was originally called "New Baltimore Station" because of the Grand Trunk Western Railroad depot located there that did its main commerce with the village of New Baltimore, on Anchor Bay of Lake St. Clair and at the other end of the New Haven/Romeo plank road (also known as the Ashley/Romeo Plank Road) that served the area. The portion of the plank road that went through the village became the main road of New Haven. This road changes its name a few times, becoming Main Street in New Haven and Washington Street in New Baltimore.

The Grand Trunk Western railroad company that built the railroad station in 1865 handled freight, livestock, and later farm goods shipped by rail throughout the Midwest. The depot had a living quarters for the station agent and his family at one end. With rounded windows in the Italianate style, it was similar to the Smiths Creek depot that is now in Greenfield Village. The depot is still located in its original location, one of the few in the Midwest that can claim that distinction. It has been restored as the village museum.

New Haven received its first post office on January 6, 1838, and Charles B. Matthews was the postmaster. Adam Bennett was the most active organizer of the village in its earliest days.

Benjamin L. Bates was elected as the first village president when the village of New Haven was incorporated on May 3, 1869. New Haven is the largest incorporated area in Lenox Township of Macomb County.

By around 1875, early industries in the village of New Haven included a general store, a sawmill, an iron foundry, a creamery, hardware store, a roller place that made flour, a farm supply business, two doctors, three flour, seed, and feed businesses, two garages to repair carriages and machinery of the day, a grocery and meat shop, a dry goods store, a drug store, a cooper (barrel) shop, two blacksmiths, two shoe and boot stores, a harness shop, a stove shop, two wagon shops, a livery stable, and a hotel chiefly known as the Graustark Hotel.

By the early 1900s, New Haven had electricity produced in a power house located on the north side of Ann Street, owned by Frank Phelps, also the owner of one of the first motorcars in the village. He had the dynamo that produced enough electricity to light the whole village located in the back of his building, originally called the Old Power House. In the front of the building he sold ice cream, candy and other items such as oyster stew. He would also project movies on weekend nights. He would use a large screen secured between two poles to project silent films (with phonograph accompaniment) to the townspeople.

New Haven built their own water system in 1945. In 1948, the New Haven Public Library was formed.

New Haven had a few newspapers in its history. It appears that the village had two newspapers during 1895. The Saturday, January 12, 1895, issue (Vol. I, No. 19) of The Advance was published by T.A. Barnard. Single issues cost three cents; a yearly subscription could be had for a dollar. The Friday, November 22, 1895, issue of The Weekly Star (Vol. I, No. 27), was published by Herman Burose & Co., and in 1912 there was The People's Advocate. From 1919 to 1924 there was The New Haven Star. In the 1940s, there was the New Haven Herald, eventually purchased by the Anchor Bay Beacon of New Baltimore. In 2017, New Haven High School won a Michigan championship basketball game.

== Geography ==
New Haven is in eastern Macomb County, 10 miles (16 km) northeast of Mount Clemens, the county seat, and 26 miles (42 km) southwest of Port Huron. Highway M-19 passes through the east side of the village, leading south 1.5 miles (2.4 km) to Exit 247 on Interstate 94 and northeast 7 miles (11 km) to Richmond.

According to the United States Census Bureau, the village of New Haven has a total area of 2.53 square miles (6.55 km^{2}), of which 0.001 square miles (0.003 km^{2}), or 0.04%, are water. The Salt River passes through the east side of the village, flowing south to Lake St. Clair at Point Lakeview.

== Demographics ==
Historical population
Census	Pop.	Note	%±
1870	413		—
1880	600		45.3%
1890	606		1.0%
1900	489		−19.3%
1910	478		−2.2%
1920	535		11.9%
1930	774		44.7%
1940	904		16.8%
1950	1,082		19.7%
1960	1,198		10.7%
1970	1,855		54.8%
1980	1,871		0.9%
1990	2,331		24.6%
2000	3,071		31.7%
2010	4,642		51.2%
2020	6,097		31.3%
U.S. Decennial Census

=== 2020 census ===
As of the 2020 census, New Haven had a population of 6,097. The median age was 31.7 years. 30.5% of residents were under the age of 18 and 7.8% of residents were 65 years of age or older. For every 100 females there were 92.6 males, and for every 100 females age 18 and over there were 89.5 males age 18 and over.

98.0% of residents lived in urban areas, while 2.0% lived in rural areas.

There were 2,034 households in New Haven, of which 47.5% had children under the age of 18 living in them. Of all households, 46.7% were married-couple households, 15.7% were households with a male householder and no spouse or partner present, and 26.5% were households with a female householder and no spouse or partner present. About 18.3% of all households were made up of individuals and 4.8% had someone living alone who was 65 years of age or older.

There were 2,111 housing units, of which 3.6% were vacant. The homeowner vacancy rate was 1.8% and the rental vacancy rate was 2.3%.

Racial composition as of the 2020 census
Race	Number	Percent
White	4,386	71.9%
Black or African American	881	14.4%
American Indian and Alaska Native	31	0.5%
Asian	31	0.5%
Native Hawaiian and Other Pacific Islander	0	0.0%
Some other race	153	2.5%
Two or more races	615	10.1%
Hispanic or Latino (of any race)	391	6.4%

=== 2010 census ===
As of the census of 2010, there were 4,642 people, 1,552 households, and 1,160 families residing in the village. The population density was 1,834.8 inhabitants per square mile (708.4/km^{2}). There were 1,695 housing units at an average density of 670.0 per square mile (258.7/km^{2}). The racial makeup of the village was 76.3% White, 16.9% African American, 0.5% Native American, 0.5% Asian, 0.1% Pacific Islander, 1.3% from other races, and 4.5% from two or more races. Hispanic or Latino of any race were 4.8% of the population.

There were 1,552 households, of which 49.4% had children under the age of 18 living with them, 48.8% were married couples living together, 19.7% had a female householder with no husband present, 6.3% had a male householder with no wife present, and 25.3% were non-families. 19.6% of all households were made up of individuals, and 4.7% had someone living alone who was 65 years of age or older. The average household size was 2.96 and the average family size was 3.40.

The median age in the village was 31.1 years. 33% of residents were under the age of 18; 7.9% were between the ages of 18 and 24; 32.4% were from 25 to 44; 20.8% were from 45 to 64; and 6% were 65 years of age or older. The gender makeup of the village was 48.5% male and 51.5% female.

=== 2000 census ===
As of the census of 2000, there were 3,071 people, 1,064 households, and 785 families residing in the village. The population density was 1,269.6 inhabitants per square mile (490.2/km^{2}). There were 1,138 housing units at an average density of 470.5 per square mile (181.7/km^{2}). The racial makeup of the village was 74.86% White, 18.95% African American, 0.72% Native American, 0.10% Asian, 0.98% from other races, and 4.40% from two or more races. Hispanic or Latino of any race were 3.81% of the population.

There were 1,064 households, out of which 44.5% had children under the age of 18 living with them, 46.7% were married couples living together, 20.2% had a female householder with no husband present, and 26.2% were non-families. 20.7% of all households were made up of individuals, and 5.5% had someone living alone who was 65 years of age or older. The average household size was 2.84 and the average family size was 3.24.

In the village, the population dispersal was 32.3% under the age of 18, 10.1% from 18 to 24, 33.7% from 25 to 44, 17.7% from 45 to 64, and 6.2% who were 65 years of age or older. The median age was 30 years. For every 100 females, there were 97.5 males. For every 100 females age 18 and over, there were 92.9 males.

The median income for a household in the village was $40,699, and the median income for a family was $45,523. Males had a median income of $39,375 versus $26,321 for females. The per capita income for the village was $16,739. About 10.4% of families and 14.5% of the population were below the poverty line, including 15.6% of those under age 18 and 14.8% of those age 65 or over.

== Notable people ==
- Romeo Weems, professional basketball player
