= Jimmie Wilson Jr. =

American politician from Michigan

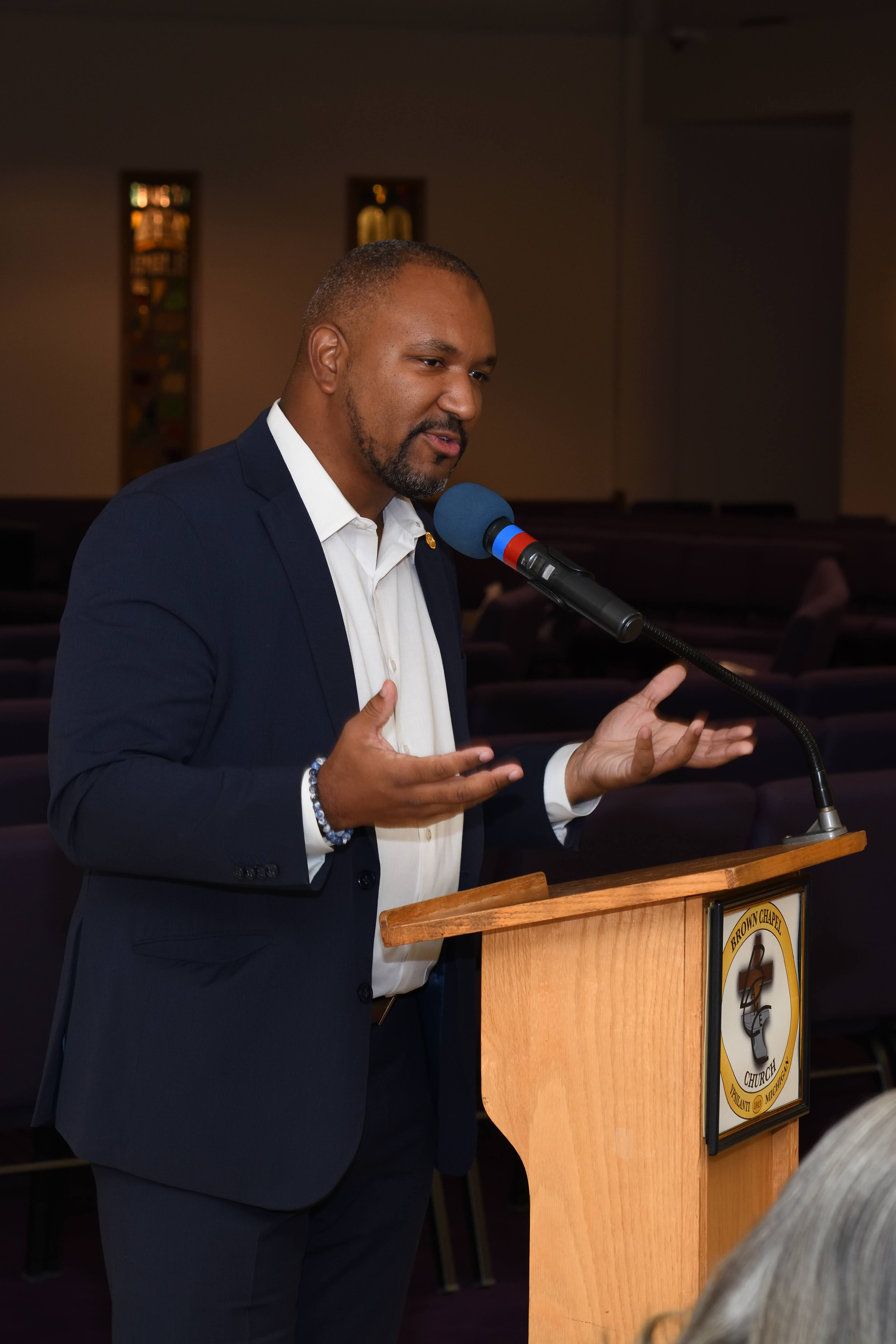

Member of the Michigan House of Representatives from the 32nd district
- Incumbent
- Assumed office January 1, 2023
- Preceded by: Pamela Hornberger (redistricting)

Personal details
- Born: October 27, 1982 (age 43) Ypsilanti, Michigan
- Party: Democratic
- Education: Michigan Institute of Aviation and Technology; Henry Ford Community College
- Profession: politician

Jimmie Wilson Jr. (born October 27, 1982) is an American politician serving as a member of the Michigan House of Representatives since 2023, representing the 32nd district. A member of the Democratic Party, Wiilson was reelected in 2024.
