= Kappa Eta Kappa (Richmond literary club) =

Early 20th-century literary and civic club in Richmond, Michigan

Kappa Eta Kappa was a women's literary, study, and civic club in Richmond, Michigan, active in the early twentieth century. The club was organized in 1903, joined the Detroit Federation of Women's Clubs in 1911, and joined the Michigan State Federation of Women's Clubs in 1920. Contemporary newspapers described it as a Richmond literary club and literary society.

The club combined literary programming with civic, charitable, educational, and public-library activity. In 1910, members were reported to be planning a public library and club in Richmond. A 1915 report stated that the Richmond library was one of the projects which Kappa Eta Kappa was largely instrumental in devising, and a 1922 notice described the library as having been started and fostered by the Woman's Club and Civic Society. In 1921, after eighteen years under the name Kappa Eta Kappa, the organization announced that it would change its name to the Richmond Woman's Club.

== Background ==
Kappa Eta Kappa was part of the wider women's-club movement in Michigan. The Michigan State Federation of Women's Clubs was established in 1895 as an affiliate of the General Federation of Women's Clubs and initially consisted of women's charitable and literary clubs from across the state. Kappa Eta Kappa appeared in the federation's 1920–1921 year book under Richmond, Macomb County, after having joined the Detroit Federation of Women's Clubs in 1911 and the state federation in 1920. HathiTrust's catalog record for the federation year books identifies the serial as a directory and periodical of the Michigan State Federation of Women's Clubs.

== History ==
The club was organized in Richmond in 1903. A 1921 notice stated that the society had used the name Kappa Eta Kappa for eighteen years.

By 1910, Kappa Eta Kappa had become involved in civic and educational work. A newspaper report headlined "Plan Club to Keep Youth Off Street" stated that members of the Kappa Eta Kappa society of Richmond were planning to establish a public library and club. The article said the proposed institution was intended to keep younger people off the streets and enable them to improve their minds, and that the movement was non-sectarian and would be supported by the village's social organizations.

In January 1913, the officers of Kappa Eta Kappa, or their representatives, were invited by the Diversity Literary Club of Detroit to attend that club's Reciprocity Day. The same notice listed Kappa Eta Kappa officers, including a president, vice-president, secretary, treasurer, critic, and librarian. By October 1913, the club was reported to have opened its eleventh season with a "President's evening" at the home of Mr. and Mrs. O. Culver and Mrs. Jeannette G. McEachern. The event included members and their husbands, an informal reception after the summer recess, a review of the club's achievements by Mrs. Reed, the distribution of yearbooks, and an introductory talk on Palestine by Rev. G. H. Bacheler.

In November 1914, the club observed its eleventh anniversary at the home of Mrs. J. A. Heath. The local press described Heath as the main mover in the formation of the club. A 1922 obituary identified her as Sadie Allington Heath and described her as a charter member of the Richmond Woman's Club and the Sorority.

The club remained active in local newspaper notices through its 1921 name change. Meetings were commonly held in members' homes. Notices reported meetings at or scheduled for the homes of Mrs. Irving W. Greene, Mrs. J. S. O'Rourke, Mrs. Jeannette G. McEachren, Miss Ella Hunt, Mrs. C. B. Lutes, Mrs. Olney Culver, and Mrs. Melvin Weeks.

== Organization ==
The 1920–1921 year book of the Michigan State Federation of Women's Clubs listed Kappa Eta Kappa under Richmond, Macomb County. The entry stated that the club met on the first Tuesday from October to May, held its annual meeting at the last meeting of the club year, and had fifteen members. It named Mrs. Irving W. Greene as president and Mrs. Charles W. Reed as corresponding secretary.

The same directory identified the club's study subject as "Modern Subjects". A separate state librarian report listed Kappa Eta Kappa study subjects as South America and "History and Michigan".

The club's known officers changed over time. A 1910 newspaper report listed Mrs. Melvin Weeks as president and Mrs. Charles Reed as secretary, with Mrs. W. H. Acker, Mrs. Frank Fanning, and Miss Hunt serving on the executive committee for the library-and-club project. In January 1913, the club's officers were listed as Mrs. Jeannette G. McEachren, president; Miss Olive Black, vice-president; Mrs. Charles W. Reed, secretary; Mrs. Charles E. Greene, treasurer; Mrs. J. A. Heath, critic; and Mrs. Olney Culver, librarian.

== Public library work ==
Kappa Eta Kappa was connected with Richmond's early public-library movement. In 1910, a newspaper report stated that members of Kappa Eta Kappa were planning to establish a public library and club in Richmond. Newspaper notices in 1913 show the Richmond Civic Improvement Club taking up the same library project. In March 1913, the Richmond Civic Improvement Club was scheduled to meet with Mrs. O. Culver, with the establishment of a public library described as the leading topic. The following month, a notice stated that Miss Inez Culver would act as librarian in the new public library to be opened by the Richmond Civic Improvement Club on April 26, with 1,000 volumes on the shelves at the opening.

A 1915 report linked Kappa Eta Kappa directly to the library, stating that the Richmond library was "one of the projects which the K. E. K. was largely instrumental in devising", and that, under the management of the Richmond Civic Club, it had acquired a firm standing among village institutions. The Culver family remained associated with the library; in 1918, Inez Culver was described as a musician and librarian in the Richmond public library.

After Kappa Eta Kappa became the Richmond Woman's Club, a 1922 notice reported that Mrs. Culver gave a brief history of the Richmond library, which the notice described as "started and fostered by the Woman's club and Civic society". In 1923, a concert was given under the auspices of the Richmond Woman's Club to start a fund toward a library building. The City of Richmond's history of the present Lois Wagner Memorial Library traces Richmond's first public library to Mrs. Olney Culver's home in 1912 and states that it was founded by the ladies of the Civic Society.

== Activities ==
Kappa Eta Kappa followed the pattern of many local literary and study clubs of the period, combining private-home meetings, assigned readings, invited lectures, annual yearbooks, and civic-improvement work. In 1911, a newspaper notice stated that the club had appointed committees to cooperate with local citizens in making Richmond "clean and attractive".

The club's 1913–1914 program included the history of Palestine and anticipated addresses by invited speakers. At a meeting reported in December 1913, roll call on "Famous Bible Pictures" led to discussion of works by old masters and the Mona Lisa, while papers addressed leprosy, Lebanon, and the Maccabees. At a meeting reported in January 1914, one member read a description of leprosy. The club's yearbooks for the 1913 season were described as covered in royal purple and white.

During the First World War period, the club's meetings included patriotic, relief, and reform topics. A January 1918 notice described one meeting as among the most patriotic in the club's history. The program included "Events that are making history", a description of Glacier National Park by Mrs. F. A. Neddermeyer, a paper on Alaska by Mrs. C. W. Reed, a Red Cross poem read by Miss Ella Hunt, a current-topic presentation on women's work by Mrs. Frank Fanning, and an address by Miss Marie B. Ames of the National Suffrage Association.

Kappa Eta Kappa also appeared in notices concerning charity and public welfare. A notice about the Florence Crittenton mission credited the club, abbreviated as K. E. K., with an appeal that led to the packing of a barrel of canned fruit for the institution. Another notice reported the club's interest in the Starr Commonwealth Home for Boys and stated that the club subscribed five dollars toward the purchase of bed linen. In 1918, a Richmond notice on cold weather, coal shortages, and high living costs advised residents knowing of elderly or infirm people in need to call the presidents of local organizations, including Kappa Eta Kappa, the Monday Club, the Sorority, Boy Scouts, Camp Fire Girls, or men's societies.

In 1916, Ella Simmons Lovejoy was described in a wedding notice as a charter member of Kappa Eta Kappa and as first president of the Lenox Civic Society, which the notice said she helped organize for the welfare and beautification of Richmond and for securing public gardens and parks. In 1920, a Richmond political notice referred to Kappa Eta Kappa as "the leading women's club" and stated that Burt D. Cady of Port Huron would be asked by the club to seek a return speaking date for Mary L. Veenfliet.

== Name change to Richmond Woman's Club ==
In August 1921, newspapers reported that Kappa Eta Kappa would change its name to the Richmond Woman's Club. The report described Kappa Eta Kappa as a literary society composed of a few of Richmond's representative women and said that, after eighteen years under its original name, the organization would adopt a name more in keeping with the times and with its activities. It stated that the new name would be announced with the appearance of the 1921–1922 year book.

The officers listed at the time of the name change were Mrs. Mary E. Neddermeyer, president; Mrs. Mildred Weeks, vice-president; Mrs. Ella M. Lutes, recording secretary; Mrs. Jeannette Carl, treasurer; and Mrs. Esther A. Reed, corresponding secretary.

After the name change, the Richmond Woman's Club continued to appear in local notices. In October 1921, the club was scheduled to meet with Mrs. C. W. Reed and to hear a report of the state convention. In November 1922, Mrs. Culver gave a brief history of the Richmond library at a Woman's Club meeting, and the notice described the library as having been started and fostered by the Woman's Club and Civic Society. In November 1923, a concert was given under the auspices of the Richmond Woman's Club to start a fund toward a library building. A 1938 notice reported that Mrs. O. Culver was hostess to members of the Richmond Woman's Club at the home of Mrs. David Carl.

== Known officers and associated persons ==
Contemporary sources identify the following officers, members, and participants. Names are given in the forms used by the cited notices.

Person	Roles and notices
Mrs. W. H. Acker	Member of the executive committee for the 1910 library-and-club project.
Rev. G. H. Bacheler	Speaker on Palestine at the opening meeting of the 1913–1914 season.
Miss Olive Black	Vice-president in 1913.
Mrs. Jeannette Carl	Treasurer of the Richmond Woman's Club when the name change was announced in 1921.
Mrs. Olney Culver	Librarian in 1913; hostess for a Richmond Woman's Club meeting in 1921; associated with the early Richmond public library through Civic Society and Culver-family notices.
Miss Inez Culver	Named as librarian of the new public library to be opened by the Richmond Civic Improvement Club in 1913; described as librarian in the Richmond public library in 1918.
Mrs. Frank Fanning	Member of the executive committee for the 1910 library-and-club project; presenter on woman's work at a 1918 patriotic meeting.
Mrs. Charles E. Greene	Treasurer in 1913.
Mrs. Irving W. Greene	Hostess for the last meeting of 1913; president in the 1920–1921 federation year book.
Mrs. J. A. Heath / Sadie Allington Heath	Critic in 1913; described in 1914 as the main mover in the formation of the club; identified in a 1922 obituary as a charter member of the Richmond Woman's Club.
Miss Ella Hunt / Miss Hunt	Member of the executive committee for the 1910 library-and-club project; hostess for a scheduled meeting in 1917; reader of a Red Cross poem at a 1918 patriotic meeting.
Mrs. Ella Simmons Lovejoy	Described in a 1916 wedding notice as a charter member of Kappa Eta Kappa and first president of the Lenox Civic Society.
Mrs. C. B. Lutes / Mrs. Ella M. Lutes	Hostess in April 1920; recording secretary of the Richmond Woman's Club when the name change was announced in 1921.
Mrs. Jeannette G. McEachern / Mrs. Jeannette G. McEachren	President in 1913; hostess for a postponed meeting in 1916.
Mrs. F. A. Neddermeyer / Mrs. Mary E. Neddermeyer	Hostess for the meeting following the October 1913 President's evening; presenter at a 1918 patriotic meeting; president when the club announced its name change to the Richmond Woman's Club in 1921.
Mrs. J. S. O'Rourke	Hostess for meetings reported in 1914, 1917, and 1918.
Mrs. Charles Reed / Mrs. Charles W. Reed / Mrs. Esther A. Reed	Secretary for the 1910 library-and-club project; secretary in the 1913 officer list; corresponding secretary in the 1920–1921 federation year book; corresponding secretary of the Richmond Woman's Club when the name change was announced in 1921.
Mrs. Melvin Weeks / Mrs. Mildred Weeks	President of the 1910 library-and-club project; vice-president of the Richmond Woman's Club when the name change was announced in 1921; hostess for a scheduled meeting in November 1920.

== See also ==
- Women's club movement in the United States
- General Federation of Women's Clubs
