= Macomb Correctional Facility =

Prison in Michigan, United States

- Interactive map of Macomb Correctional Facility
- Location: Lenox Township, Michigan; 42.72340°N 82.76259°W
- Status: Open
- Security class: Level I, II, & IV
- Capacity: 1416
- Opened: 1993
- Managed by: Michigan Department of Corrections
- Warden: Jeff Tanner
- Website: Official website

Macomb Correctional Facility (MRF) is a Michigan prison, located in Lenox Township, for adult male prisoners.

== Facility ==
The prison was opened in 1993 and has eleven major and two minor buildings, totaling approximately 300,000 square feet (28,000 m^{2}), on 100 acres (40 ha) with a capacity of 1416 prisoners. It has seven housing units currently used for Michigan Department of Corrections male prisoners 18 years of age and older. One of the housing units is used for Level I (lower level security) prisoners, four housing units for Level II prisoners, and two housing units for Level IV (higher level security) prisoners. Four other buildings provide for education, support services, storage, and prison administration.

=== Security ===
The facility is surrounded by three 12 feet (3.7 m) chain link fences with razor-ribbon wire. Electronic detection systems and patrol vehicles are also utilized to maintain perimeter security. Two gun towers were added in 1997. In 2019, press reports indicated the towers are only staffed intermittently.

== Services ==
The facility offers education programs and community volunteer programs. Onsite medical and dental care is supplemented by local community providers and the Duane L. Waters Hospital in Jackson, Michigan.

== Notable Inmates ==
Inmate Name	Register Number	Status	Details
Deangelo Martin	493207 / 2416020W	Serving a 45-70 year sentence. Earliest release date in 2064.	Murdered 4 women between 2018-2019.
Lawrence Paul Mills	681998 / 4411799A	Eligible for parole in 2050.	Convicted of murdering two women.
Jared Chance	756132/2444662H	Serving a 200 year sentence.	Convicted in 2019 of the 2018 murder of Ashley Young.

== See also ==
- List of Michigan state prisons
