= Pamela Hornberger =

American politician (born 1968)

Speaker pro tempore of the Michigan House of Representatives
- In office January 13, 2021 – January 1, 2023
- Preceded by: Jason Wentworth
- Succeeded by: Laurie Pohutsky

Member of the Michigan House of Representatives from the 32nd district
- In office January 1, 2017 – January 1, 2023
- Preceded by: Andrea LaFontaine
- Succeeded by: Jimmie Wilson Jr.

Personal details
- Born: May 1968 (age 58)
- Party: Republican
- Education: Michigan State University (BS); Wayne State University (GrDip); Saginaw Valley State University (MS)
- Website: Party website

Pamela L. Hornberger (born May 1968) is an American politician. Hornberger was a Republican member of the Michigan House of Representatives.

== Education ==
In 1991, Hornberger earned a BS degree in Management from Michigan State University. In 1993, Hornberger earned a Certified Teacher from Wayne State University. In 1996, Hornberger earned a master's degree in Education Administration from Saginaw Valley State University.

== Career ==
Hornberger was an art teacher in the East China School District in East China Township, Michigan. In 1994, Hornberger became a teacher at Imlay City Community Schools.

Hornberger also served as a member of the L'Anse Creuse school board for six years, where she was treasurer. She also served as a member of the local Selective Service System board.

She became increasingly active in politics and in 2016 ran for the State House. In November 2016, Hornberger was elected as a member of Michigan House of Representatives for District 32. Hornberger is the chairwoman of the House Education Committee.

Following the 2020 Michigan House of Representatives election where the GOP caucus maintained its 58–52 majority, Hornberger was selected by her Republican colleagues to serve as Speaker pro tempore of the House for the 2021-22 legislative sessions, to succeed the Jason Wentworth, who was selected to serve as the next Speaker of the House.

== Personal life ==
Hornberger is a resident of Chesterfield Township, Michigan.

== See also ==
- 2018 Michigan House of Representatives election

Michigan House of Representatives
Preceded by Jason Wentworth	Speaker pro tempore of the Michigan House of Representatives; 2021–2023	Succeeded by Laurie Pohutsky
