= Maryglade College =

Catholic college

Maryglade College was a private Catholic college and seminary located in Memphis, Michigan, United States. It opened in 1960 and closed in 1973 or 1974.
