= Lawrence Paul Mills =

American serial killer

Lawrence Mills
- Born: Lawrence Paul Mills III; September 3, 1987 (age 39); Garden City, Michigan, U.S.
- Years active: 2017
- Children: 1
- Convictions: 2nd degree murder (x2); Assault causing miscarriage, stillbirth, or death
- Penalty: 28–48 years in prison

Details
- Victims: 3–4 killed; 1–2 survived
- Country: United States
- State: Michigan
- Weapon: Cars
- Date apprehended: April 24, 2020
- Imprisoned at: Macomb Correctional Facility

Lawrence Paul Mills III (born September 3, 1987) is an American serial killer. He murdered two women, one of whom was pregnant, by running them over with his car in Detroit, Michigan, between October and December 2017. After being arrested on April 24, 2020, he was sentenced to 28–48 years in prison the following year. He is also suspected of at least two other hit-and-runs, one of which was fatal.

== Personal life ==
Lawrence Mills was born on September 3, 1987, in Garden City, Michigan. A father of one, Mills frequently posted photos of him and his son on Facebook. He also worked at a pizza place in Allen Park.

== Murders ==
Mills' modus operandi consisted of soliciting prostitutes, engaging in sexual acts with them, and then running them over with his vehicle, a 2006 golden tan Chevy Trailblazer, to take his money back. He would sometimes beat his victims before running them over.

The first victim was Melinda Salazar, a 34-year-old pregnant woman. At 3 a.m. on October 16, 2017, her body was discovered on a sidewalk of Southwest Detroit. The second victim was 59-year-old Carrole Ann White, whose body was found at 3:45 a.m. on December 13, 2017. She was face-down in the snow between the sidewalk and street of Campbell in Southwest Detroit. Days later, Mills beat a 29-year-old pregnant woman and struck her several times with his car. However, the woman was able to get away and call police.

Mills is also suspected of at least two other hit-and-runs. On March 17, 2017, a similar incident happened at about 4 a.m. near Michigan and St. James. The victim survived. He is also suspected in the death of Mary Penegor, a 32-year-old woman who was found dead on the same street as the other victims. Investigators believe Mills may be responsible for several other attacks and murders, as he had the ability to frequently change vehicles and repair cars.

== Arrest ==
After an investigation spanning several years, Mills was arrested on April 24, 2020. Despite confessing to two murders, Mills pleaded not guilty to the charges he was accused of. On November 17, 2021, Mills was sentenced to 28 – 48 years in prison after being found guilty of two counts of second degree murder and assault causing a miscarriage, stillbirth, or death. He is now imprisoned at the Macomb Correctional Facility.

== See also ==
- Crime in Detroit
- Violence against prostitutes
- List of serial killers in the United States
