= Richmond High School (Michigan) =

Location
- 35320 Division Rd; Richmond, Michigan 48062; United States
- Coordinates: 42°48′29″N 82°45′37″W

Information
- Type: Public high school
- School district: Richmond Community Schools
- Principal: Andrea Szabo
- Teaching staff: 26.10 (on an FTE basis)
- Grades: 9-12
- Enrollment: 530 (2022-2023)
- Student to teacher ratio: 20.31
- Campus: Town, fringe
- Colors: Blue and white
- Nickname: Blue Devils
- Website: www.richmond.k12.mi.us/o/rhs

Richmond High School is a high school in Richmond, Michigan. The school is a part of Richmond Community Schools and educates students in grades 9–12.

== Athletics ==
- Competitive cheerleading — state champion — 2012, 2013, 2019, 2020, 2021, 2022
- Soccer (boys) — state champion — 2006
- Softball — state champion — 2016, 2021, 2025
- Volleyball — state champion — 1983
- Wrestling — state champion — 2000, 2002, 2006, 2010, 2011, 2012, 2015, 2017

● Trap Shooting -state champion - 2018
