= Richmond, Michigan =

- City
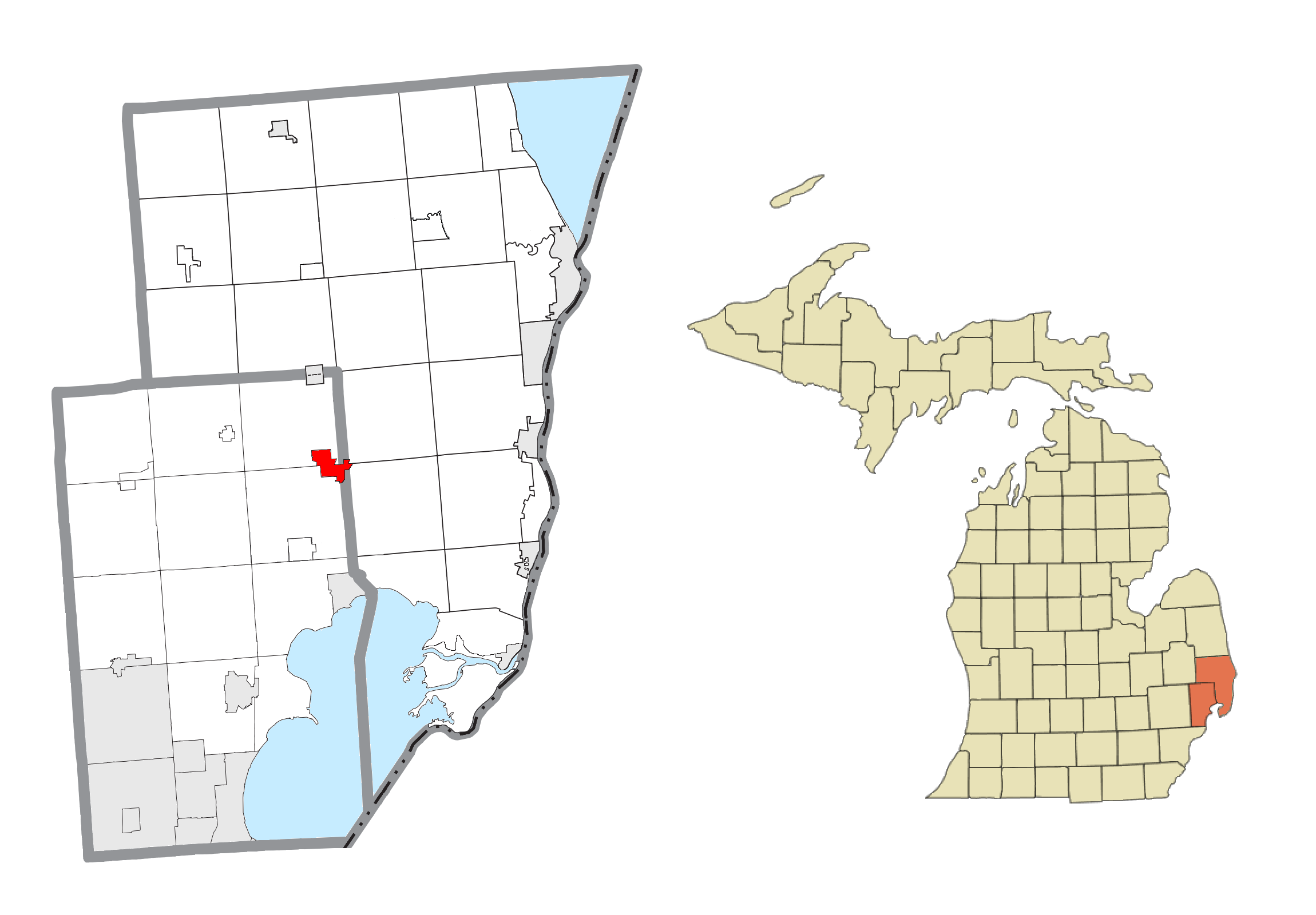
- Location within Macomb County (bottom) and St. Clair County (top)

- Location within the state of Michigan Location within the United States
- Coordinates: 42°48′33″N 82°45′21″W
- Country: United States
- State: Michigan
- Counties: Macomb and St. Clair
- Settled: 1835
- Incorporated: 1879 (village); 1966 (city)

Government
  - Type: Mayor–council
  - Mayor: Tim Rix
  - Clerk: Heather McCallister
  - Manager: Jon Moore

Area
  - Total: 2.92 sq mi (7.57 km^{2})
  - Land: 2.89 sq mi (7.49 km^{2})
  - Water: 0.035 sq mi (0.09 km^{2})
- Elevation: 732 ft (223 m)

Population (2020)
  - Total: 5,878
  - Density: 2,033.91/sq mi (785.30/km^{2})
- Time zone: UTC-5 (Eastern (EST))
  - Summer (DST): UTC-4 (EDT)
- ZIP code(s): 48062
- Area code: 586
- FIPS code: 26-68380
- GNIS feature ID: 0635886
- Website: Official website

Richmond is a city within Metro Detroit in the U.S. state of Michigan. The population was 5,878 at the 2020 census. Most of the city is located in Macomb County, though there is a small portion in neighboring St. Clair County.

== History ==
In 1835, Erastus Beebe set out with two brothers and several other people to create a new city out of a wilderness area in Michigan. He founded Beebe's Corners, which in 1878 agreed to join with the two nearest neighboring communities of Ridgeway and Cooper Town to form the village of Richmond. In 1879, the Michigan Legislature officially created the village charter. In 1989, the city annexed the Muttonville area of Lenox Township, parts of Richmond Township in Macomb County, and part of Casco and Columbus Townships in St. Clair County.

== Geography ==
Richmond is 38 miles (61 km) northeast of downtown Detroit, 16 miles (26 km) northeast of Mount Clemens, the Macomb county seat, and 26 miles (42 km) southwest of Port Huron, the St. Clair county seat. Highway M-19 passes through Richmond as its Main Street, leading north 6 miles (10 km) to Memphis and south 7 miles (11 km) to New Haven.

The city is adjacent to Richmond Township and Lenox Township in Macomb County, although it is administratively autonomous. It is also adjacent to St. Clair County's Columbus Township and Casco Township.

According to the United States Census Bureau, Richmond has a total area of 2.92 square miles (7.56 km^{2}), of which 2.89 square miles (7.49 km^{2}) are land and 0.03 square miles (0.08 km^{2}), or 1.16%, are water.

=== Neighborhoods ===
- Muttonville is in the southeastern part of the city on the boundary with adjacent Casco Township in St. Clair County at 42°47′47″N 82°44′07″W. It was so named because it was the principal slaughterhouse for what was predominantly a sheep raising area.

== Demographics ==
Historical population
Census	Pop.	Note	%±
1880	750		—
1890	1,074		43.2%
1900	1,133		5.5%
1910	1,277		12.7%
1920	1,303		2.0%
1930	1,493		14.6%
1940	1,722		15.3%
1950	2,025		17.6%
1960	2,667		31.7%
1970	3,234		21.3%
1980	3,536		9.3%
1990	4,141		17.1%
2000	4,897		18.3%
2010	5,735		17.1%
2020	5,878		2.5%
2023 (est.)	5,831		−0.8%
U.S. Decennial Census

=== 2020 census ===
As of the 2020 census, Richmond had a population of 5,878. The median age was 42.6 years. 20.7% of residents were under the age of 18 and 20.9% of residents were 65 years of age or older. For every 100 females there were 93.0 males, and for every 100 females age 18 and over there were 90.7 males age 18 and over.

99.9% of residents lived in urban areas, while 0.1% lived in rural areas.

There were 2,423 households in Richmond, of which 29.1% had children under the age of 18 living in them. Of all households, 46.8% were married-couple households, 17.8% were households with a male householder and no spouse or partner present, and 27.4% were households with a female householder and no spouse or partner present. About 30.3% of all households were made up of individuals and 14.0% had someone living alone who was 65 years of age or older.

There were 2,559 housing units, of which 5.3% were vacant. The homeowner vacancy rate was 1.0% and the rental vacancy rate was 7.7%.

Racial composition as of the 2020 census
Race	Number	Percent
White	5,247	89.3%
Black or African American	52	0.9%
American Indian and Alaska Native	16	0.3%
Asian	17	0.3%
Native Hawaiian and Other Pacific Islander	44	0.7%
Some other race	144	2.4%
Two or more races	358	6.1%
Hispanic or Latino (of any race)	303	5.2%

=== 2010 census ===
As of the census of 2010, there were 5,735 people living in the city. The population density was 2,012.3 inhabitants per square mile (777.0/km^{2}). There were 2,479 housing units at an average density of 869.8 per square mile (335.8/km^{2}). The racial makeup of the city was 94.2% White, 1.0% African American, 0.3% Native American, 0.2% Asian, 0.2% Pacific Islander, 2.6% from other races, and 1.5% from two or more races. Hispanic or Latino of any race were 4.6% of the population.

=== 2000 census ===
As of the census of 2000, there were 4,897 people, 1,977 households, and 1,332 families living in the city. The population density was 1,691.6 inhabitants per square mile (653.1/km^{2}). There were 2,062 housing units at an average density of 712.3 per square mile (275.0/km^{2}). The racial makeup of the city was 95.43% White, 0.25% African American, 0.31% Native American, 0.82% Asian, 0.18% Pacific Islander, 1.86% from other races, and 1.16% from two or more races. Hispanic or Latino of any race were 4.74% of the population.

There were 1,977 households, out of which 31.9% had children under the age of 18 living with them, 53.1% were married couples living together, 10.1% had a female householder with no husband present, and 32.6% were non-families. 27.8% of all households were made up of sole individuals and 11.0% had someone living alone who was 65 years of age or older. The average household size was 2.45 and the average family size was 2.99.

In the city the population was spread out, with 24.2% under the age of 18, 9.0% from 18 to 24, 30.8% from 25 to 44, 22.7% from 45 to 64, and 13.3% who were 65 years of age or older. The median age was 36 years. For every 100 females there were 92.1 males. For every 100 females age 18 and over, there were 89.6 males.

The median income for a household in the city was $43,378, and the median income for a family was $57,917. Males had a median income of $41,519 versus $26,445 for females. The per capita income for the city was $21,384. About 4.8% of families and 6.2% of the population were below the poverty line, including 7.2% of those under age 18 and 5.4% of those age 65 or over.

== Arts and recreation ==
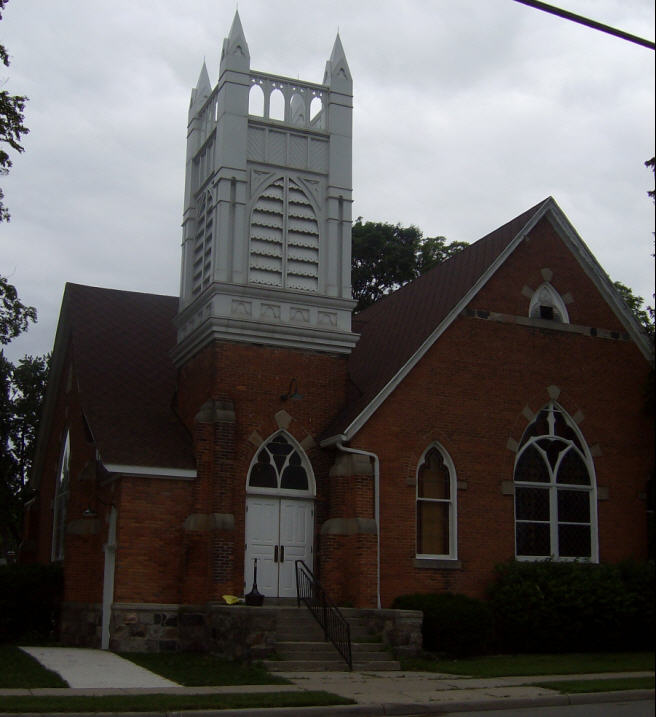
Richmond Community Theater (formerly First Congregational Church)

The city has a local library and a local community theatre. The women's literary and civic club Kappa Eta Kappa helped develop Richmond's early public-library project.

The city has three major parks – Beebe Street Memorial Park, Bailey Park, and Gierk Park. Beebe Street Memorial Park is 38.5 acres (156,000 m^{2}) and includes five baseball fields and an outdoor swimming pool. Bailey Park is a 2-acre (8,100 m^{2}) park with a baseball field, soccer field, and four tennis courts. Gierk Park is approximately one acre and includes a small playground. Various other outdoor recreational facilities can be found adjacent to the public school buildings, St. Augustine Catholic Elementary School, and St. Peter Lutheran School.

The city is a starting point for the Macomb Orchard Trail, a 23.5-mile (37.8 km) multi-use, non-motorized trail currently being developed on an abandoned railroad right-of-way in Northern Macomb County. The new trail also connects with the Stony Creek Metropark, Bloomer Park, and the Paint Creek Trail.

Each year the city hosts the Richmond Good Old Days Festival. The bulk of the festival's activities occur at Beebe Street Memorial Park. Major events at past festivals have included the "Little Miss Richmond" pageant, sporting tournaments, demolition derby, figure 8 derby, fair-cross, musical entertainment, craft show, and fireworks. The festival hosts a children's parade and a grand parade.

The local paper was the Richmond Review, which was bought out by The Voice.

== Education ==
The Richmond Community School District covers all of the municipality, as well as areas of Lenox, Casco, and Columbus townships. It includes an elementary, middle, and high school. In 2002, it had approximately 2,000 full-time students and a teacher/student ratio of 1:20. St. Augustine is a Catholic Elementary School in the city and St. Peter's is a Lutheran Elementary School in the city.

== Historic buildings ==
The First Congregational Church, home of the Richmond Community Theatre, is listed on the National Register of Historic Places, and the State of Michigan placed a historical marker] in front of the Harold and Mabelle Weller House. Kathryn Bishop Eckert's Buildings of Michigan lists St. Augustine Church as an architecturally important building due to its twin steeples, Italian gothic elements, and fieldstone facade.

The Richmond Area Historical and Genealogical Society owns and maintains three historic buildings and one replica building in Bailey Historic Park. The buildings include: 1) a one-room schoolhouse built in 1885 and originally located on School Section Road in Richmond Township; 2) a Grand Trunk Railroad Depot built in the early 1900s and originally located in Hickey, which was in Columbus Township, MI, and 3) the Donley Family Log Cabin and Outhouse, which were built in 1850 and originally located on 29 Mile Road in Lenox Township. The newest building is a replica of a Blacksmith Shop that serves as the Society's museum and office. Grand opening of the blacksmith shop was held in 2009. Check the society's website for current museum display information.

== Notable people ==
- Joseph Cella, former U.S. ambassador to Fiji, Kiribati, Tonga, Tuvalu, and Nauru. He was raised in Richmond, and is a 1983 graduate of St. Augustine Catholic School in Richmond.
- Jeff Gutt, lead singer for Stone Temple Pilots since 2017
- Andrea LaFontaine, elected as a Republican state representative in 2010 at the age of 23. She received a great deal of press attention because of her youth.
- Justin Jaynes, professional mixed martial artist, formerly competing in the Ultimate Fighting Championship (UFC)
- Steve Mazur, lead guitarist for Our Lady Peace
- Brandon Varney, racing driver
