= Wales Township, Michigan =

- Civil township
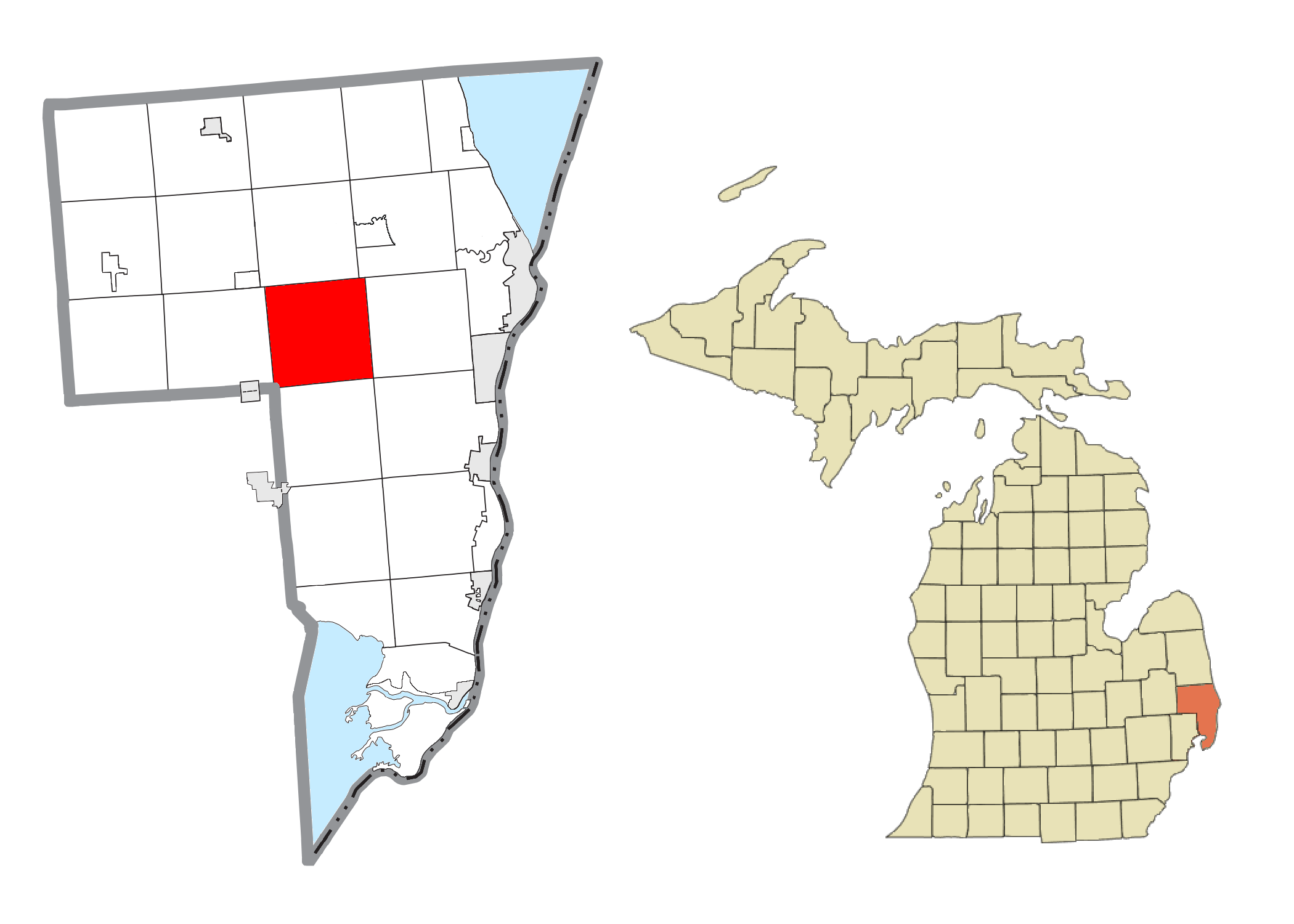
- Location within St. Clair County

- Location within the state of Michigan Location within the United States
- Coordinates: 42°57′09″N 82°41′09″W
- Country: United States
- State: Michigan
- County: St. Clair
- Established: 1841

Government
  - Supervisor: Elizabeth Masters
  - Clerk: Cynthia Bobcean

Area
  - Total: 37.44 sq mi (96.97 km^{2})
  - Land: 37.37 sq mi (96.79 km^{2})
  - Water: 0.069 sq mi (0.18 km^{2})
- Elevation: 702 ft (214 m)

Population (2020)
  - Total: 3,180
  - Density: 85.1/sq mi (32.9/km^{2})
- Time zone: UTC-5 (Eastern (EST))
  - Summer (DST): UTC-4 (EDT)
- ZIP code(s): 48006 (Avoca); 48027 (Goodells)
- Area code: 810
- FIPS code: 26-82900
- GNIS feature ID: 1627207
- Website: Official website

Wales Township is a civil township of St. Clair County in the U.S. state of Michigan. The population was 3,180 at the 2020 Census.

== Communities ==
There are a few unincorporated communities with the Township:

- Goodells is in the northern part of the township at Goodells and Morris Roads (42°58′52″N 82°39′57″W & Elevation: 705 ft./215 m.). Much of the land in the area had been purchased by speculators, and as late as 1840 there were only three resident land owners. The community was founded in 1866 when the Grand Trunk Railroad built a line and opened a station. A post office opened in November 1870. The Goodells ZIP code, 48027, serves all of Wales Township.
- Lambs is in the west central part of the township at Cove and Lambs Roads (42°55′58″N 82°42′30″W; Elevation: 728 ft./222 m.). This was a station on a branch of the Port Huron and Northwestern Railway in 1883. The settlement formed around the lumber and flour mills of J.A. Lamb. A post office operated from March 1884 until April 1942.
- Thornton, also spelled Thorton, is on the boundary with Kimball Township on Sparling Road between Emerson and Griswold Roads (42°58′07″N 82°37′03″W & Elevation: 659 ft./201 m.).
- Wales Center, also just Wales, is at the center of the township at Wales Center and Lambs Roads (42°56′31″N 82°40′42″W; Elevation: 702 ft./214 m.). The settlement took its name from the township and a post office that operated there for a time.

== Geography ==
According to the United States Census Bureau, the township has a total area of 37.4 square miles (97 km^{2}), of which 37.3 square miles (97 km^{2}) is land and 0.04 square miles (0.10 km^{2}) (0.05%) is water.

== Demographics ==
As of the census of 2000, there were 2,986 people, 1,025 households, and 835 families residing in the township. The population density was 79.9 inhabitants per square mile (30.8/km^{2}). There were 1,059 housing units at an average density of 28.4 per square mile (11.0/km^{2}). The racial makeup of the township was 95.75% White, 3.25% African American, 0.33% Native American, 0.07% Asian, 0.13% from other races, and 0.47% from two or more races. Hispanic or Latino of any race were 1.07% of the population.

There were 1,025 households, out of which 38.0% had children under the age of 18 living with them, 70.6% were married couples living together, 7.8% had a female householder with no husband present, and 18.5% were non-families. 14.5% of all households were made up of individuals, and 5.0% had someone living alone who was 65 years of age or older. The average household size was 2.89 and the average family size was 3.20.

In the township the population was spread out, with 28.2% under the age of 18, 6.7% from 18 to 24, 30.9% from 25 to 44, 25.1% from 45 to 64, and 9.1% who were 65 years of age or older. The median age was 36 years. For every 100 females, there were 103.5 males. For every 100 females age 18 and over, there were 99.5 males.

The median income for a household in the township was $51,716, and the median income for a family was $57,847. Males had a median income of $43,472 versus $27,250 for females. The per capita income for the township was $20,817. About 5.0% of families and 6.4% of the population were below the poverty line, including 9.2% of those under age 18 and 5.9% of those age 65 or over.
