= Lenox Township, Michigan =

- Civil township
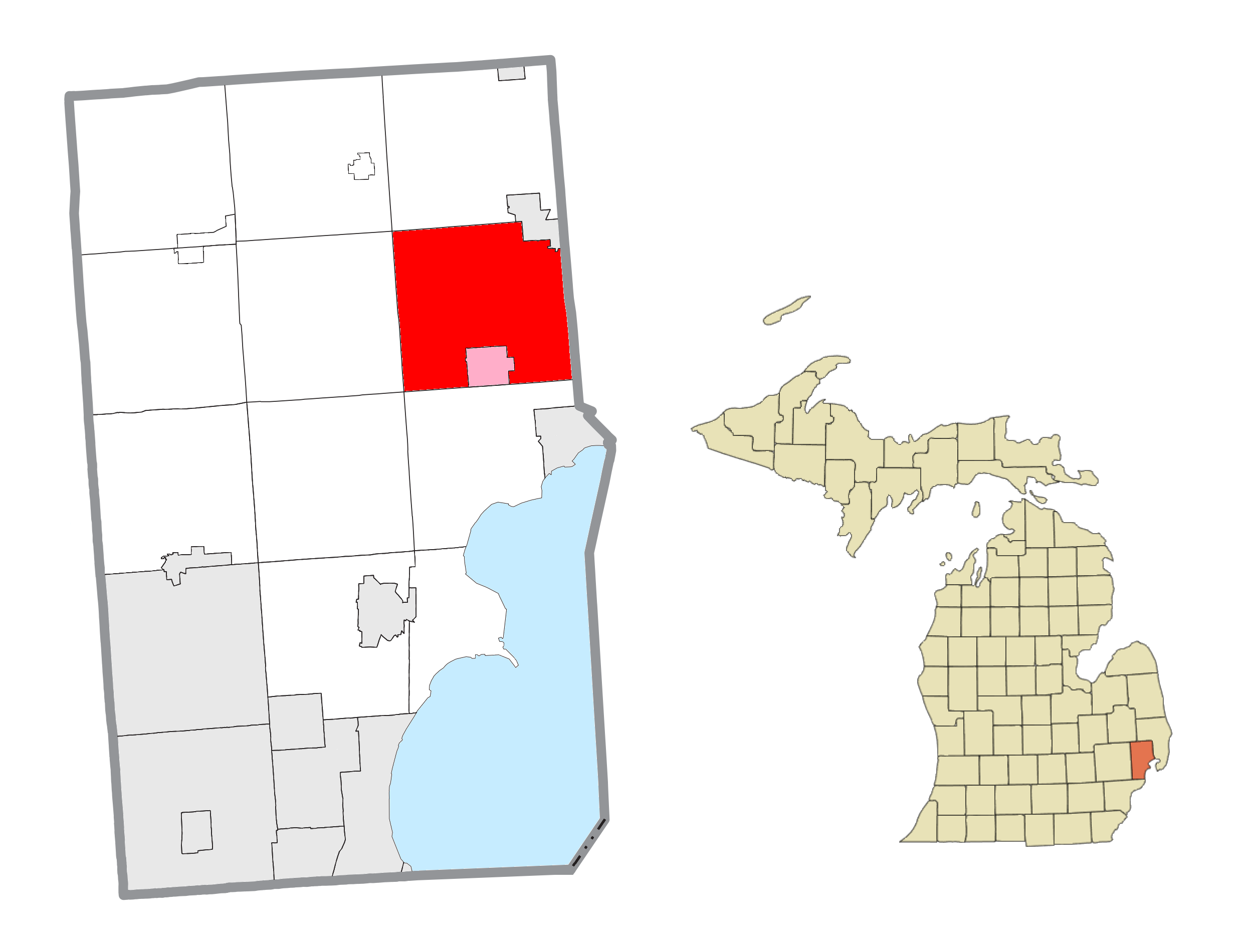
- Location within Macomb County (red) and the administered village of New Haven (pink)

- Location within Michigan Location within the United States
- Coordinates: 42°44′53″N 82°48′06″W
- Country: United States
- State: Michigan
- County: Macomb
- Formation: 1837

Government
  - Supervisor: Anthony Reeder Jr.

Area
  - Total: 38.91 sq mi (100.8 km^{2})
  - Land: 38.75 sq mi (100.4 km^{2})
  - Water: 0.17 sq mi (0.44 km^{2})
- Elevation: 660 ft (200 m)

Population (2020)
  - Total: 12,119
  - Density: 312.8/sq mi (120.8/km^{2})
- Time zone: UTC-5 (Eastern (EST))
  - Summer (DST): UTC-4 (EDT)
- ZIP Codes: 48048, 48050
- Area code: 586
- FIPS code: 26-46900
- GNIS feature ID: 1626604
- Website: www.lenox-mi.gov

Lenox Township is a civil township of Macomb County in the U.S. state of Michigan. As of the 2020 census, the population was 12,119, up from 10,470 in 2010.

== Geography ==
Lenox Township is in northeastern Macomb County and is bordered to the east by St. Clair Township. The city of Richmond borders the township to the northeast, and the village of New Haven is in the south. According to the U.S. Census Bureau, the township has a total area of 38.9 square miles (101 km^{2}), of which 0.2 square miles (0.5 km^{2}), or 0.43%, are water.

Lenox Township is flat and largely rural, made up of farmland, wetlands, and some pockets of woodlands. Although being mostly undeveloped, land development is beginning to take place, due to growing populations in southern townships, making major transportation corridors such as 26 Mile Road and Gratiot Avenue more developed. Land preservation, such as Wetzel State Recreation Area, has taken place throughout the township.

== Demographics ==
As of the census of 2000, there were 8,433 people, 2,510 households, and 1,945 families residing in the township. The population density was 217.2 inhabitants per square mile (83.9/km^{2}). There were 2,646 housing units at an average density of 68.1 per square mile (26.3/km^{2}). The racial makeup of the township was 79.00% White, 16.54% African American, 0.74% Native American, 0.26% Asian, 0.01% Pacific Islander, 0.68% from other races, and 2.77% from two or more races. Hispanic or Latino of any race were 2.83% of the population.

There were 2,510 households, out of which 39.3% had children under the age of 18 living with them, 59.1% were married couples living together, 12.9% had a female householder with no husband present, and 22.5% were non-families. 18.0% of all households were made up of individuals, and 5.5% had someone living alone who was 65 years of age or older. The average household size was 2.83 and the average family size was 3.19.

In the township the population was spread out, with 24.8% under the age of 18, 8.4% from 18 to 24, 37.9% from 25 to 44, 21.7% from 45 to 64, and 7.2% who were 65 years of age or older. The median age was 34 years. For every 100 females, there were 134.1 males. For every 100 females age 18 and over, there were 147.2 males.

The median income for a household in the township was $50,659, and the median income for a family was $54,605. Males had a median income of $43,475 versus $27,582 for females. The per capita income for the township was $18,800. About 6.2% of families and 10.1% of the population were below the poverty line, including 10.7% of those under age 18 and 11.0% of those age 65 or over.

== Government and infrastructure ==
The Michigan Department of Corrections operates the Macomb Correctional Facility in the township.
