= Kimball Township, Michigan =

- Civil township
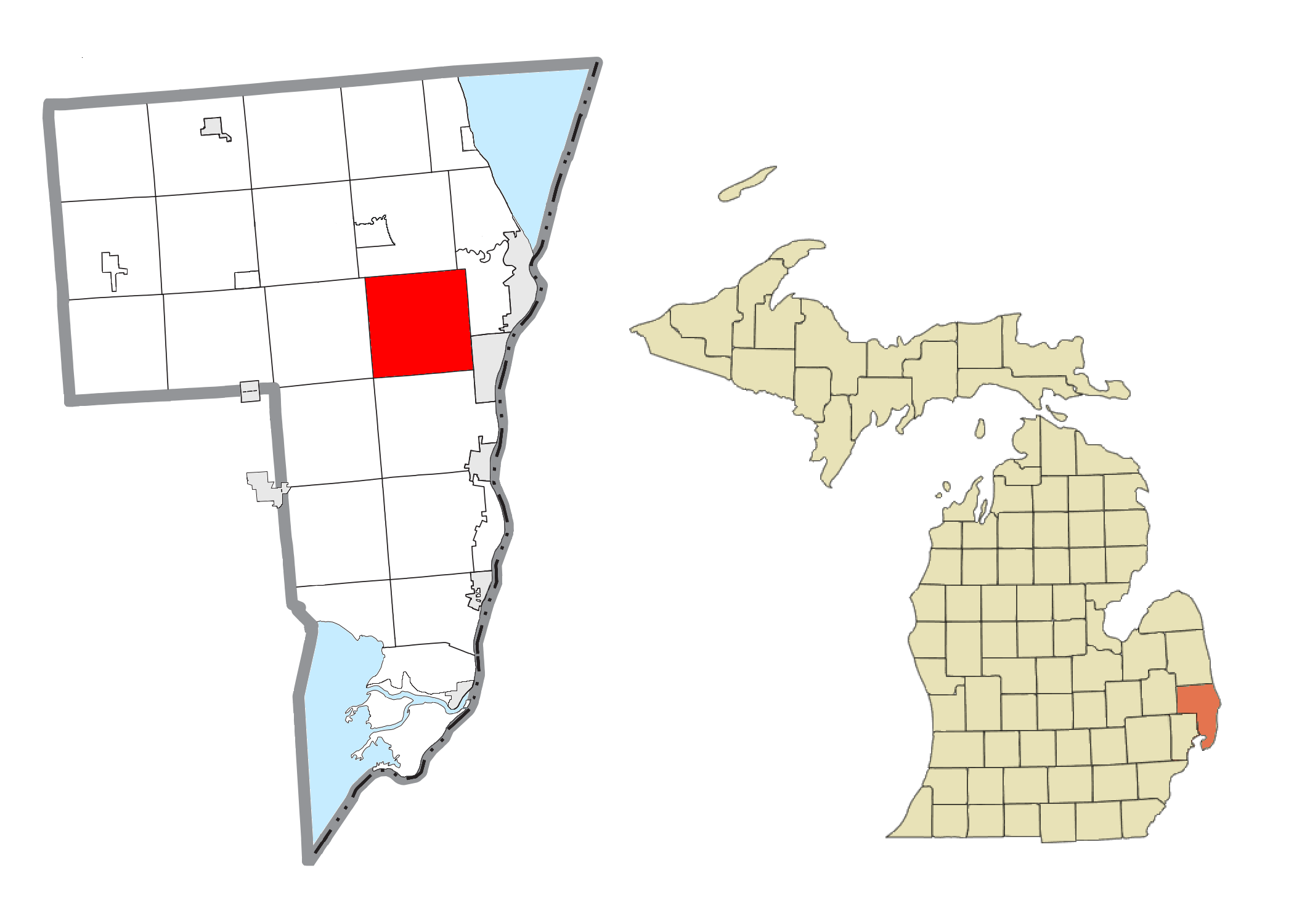
- Location within St. Clair County

- Location within the state of Michigan Location within the United States
- Coordinates: 42°56′55″N 82°34′14″W
- Country: United States
- State: Michigan
- County: St. Clair
- Established: 1855

Government
  - Supervisor: Robert Usakowski
  - Clerk: Becky Wrubel

Area
  - Total: 37.45 sq mi (97.00 km^{2})
  - Land: 37.14 sq mi (96.19 km^{2})
  - Water: 0.31 sq mi (0.80 km^{2})
- Elevation: 636 ft (194 m)

Population (2020)
  - Total: 9,609
  - Density: 258.7/sq mi (99.9/km^{2})
- Time zone: UTC-5 (Eastern (EST))
  - Summer (DST): UTC-4 (EDT)
- ZIP code(s): 48074 (Smiths Creek)
- Area code: 810
- FIPS code: 26-43160
- GNIS feature ID: 1626559
- Website: Official website

Kimball Township is a civil township of St. Clair County in the U.S. state of Michigan. As of the 2020 census, the township population was 9,609.

== Communities ==
There are a few unincorporated communities within the township:

- Kimball is near the center of the township at Ditty and Dove Roads just east of North Pine River Road (42°56′53″N 82°33′45″W; Elevation: 636 ft./194 m.). Land purchases were made as early as 1825 but settlement did not begin until about 1840 when Barzillai Wheeler and John S. Kimball arrived. When the township was organized in 1855, it was named for Kimball. It was a station on the Port Huron and Northwestern Railway in 1882 and was given a post office as "Kimbal" in December 1882. The spelling was corrected to Kimball in January 1889 and the office closed in June 1908.
- Smiths Creek is at the southwestern corner of Kimball Township and the northern portion of Saint Clair Township on the Smiths Creek tributary of the Pine River at 42°54′50″N 82°36′14″W. Both the community and the stream were named for Elisha Smith, an early landowner. A post office was established in October 1861. It was given a station on the Grand Trunk Railroad line in 1865. Smiths Creek was the county seat of St. Clair County from 1869 until April 1871, when it was removed to Port Huron. The St. Clair County Sanitary Landfill is located in Smiths Creek. Smiths Creek is said to be where Thomas Edison was kicked off the train, because of his experiments. The train depot is now at Greenfield Village, a part of the Henry Ford. The Smiths Creek ZIP code, 48074, serves all of Kimball Township.
- Sparlingville is on the west side of the township at Allen and Griswold Roads (42°57′52″N 82°31′23″W; Elevation: 653 ft./199 m.). It was founded by George Sparling, a builder and land developer circa 1923. Sparlingville was at one time an incorporated area. The Kimball Township hall is located near Sparlingville, the fire hall, library, and Sparlingville Elementary are located in the community.
- Thornton, also spelled Thorton, is on the boundary with Wales Township.
- Wadhams is in the northeast corner of the township at Wadhams and Lapeer roads (42°59′14″N 82°32′19″W ; Elevation: 669 ft. /204 m.). In 1825, Scotsman Robert Smart, with the backing of Detroit interests, built a mill on the Black River. He named the place "Clyde Mills", after the River Clyde in Scotland, where Smart had lived as a boy. In 1827, Smart sold the mill to Ralph Wadhams. A post office with the name Clyde Mills operated from March 1835 until December 1872. Clyde Township was organized in March 1836 and took its name from the settlement. When first organized, Clyde Township encompassed the area of what are now 20 townships. When Kimball Township was set off in 1855, the settlement by which Clyde Township derived its name became part of a different township; a fact with reportedly greatly disappointed Ralph Wadhams. A post office was operated with the name "Wadhams" from June 1886 through October 1887, and again from February 1890 until October 1905. Wadhams has experienced many new developments due to its proximity to Interstate 69 (I-69) and Old M-21 (the former route of M-21.)
- West Tappan is located south of Wadhams and I-69 on Wadhams Road at the rail tracks (42°58′13″N 82°32′36″W ; Elevation: 659 ft./201 m.)

== Geography ==
According to the United States Census Bureau, the township has a total area of 37.5 square miles (97 km^{2}), of which 37.2 square miles (96 km^{2}) is land and 0.3 square miles (0.78 km^{2}) (0.69%) is water.

== Demographics ==
As of the census of 2000, there were 8,628 people, 3,120 households, and 2,383 families residing in the township. The population density was 231.6 inhabitants per square mile (89.4/km^{2}). There were 3,302 housing units at an average density of 88.6 per square mile (34.2/km^{2}). The racial makeup of the township was 96.80% White, 0.89% African American, 0.39% Native American, 0.15% Asian, 0.02% Pacific Islander, 0.44% from other races, and 1.30% from two or more races. Hispanic or Latino of any race were 1.58% of the population.

There were 3,120 households, out of which 35.6% had children under the age of 18 living with them, 62.1% were married couples living together, 9.2% had a female householder with no husband present, and 23.6% were non-families. 17.6% of all households were made up of individuals, and 5.8% had someone living alone who was 65 years of age or older. The average household size was 2.74 and the average family size was 3.09.

In the township the population was spread out, with 26.5% under the age of 18, 7.3% from 18 to 24, 32.5% from 25 to 44, 23.4% from 45 to 64, and 10.3% who were 65 years of age or older. The median age was 36 years. For every 100 females, there were 101.0 males. For every 100 females age 18 and over, there were 98.1 males.

The median income for a household in the township was $47,627, and the median income for a family was $52,558. Males had a median income of $41,707 versus $24,738 for females. The per capita income for the township was $19,253. About 5.8% of families and 7.8% of the population were below the poverty line, including 8.1% of those under age 18 and 7.6% of those age 65 or over.
