= Casco Township, St. Clair County, Michigan =

Casco Township, Michigan
- Civil township
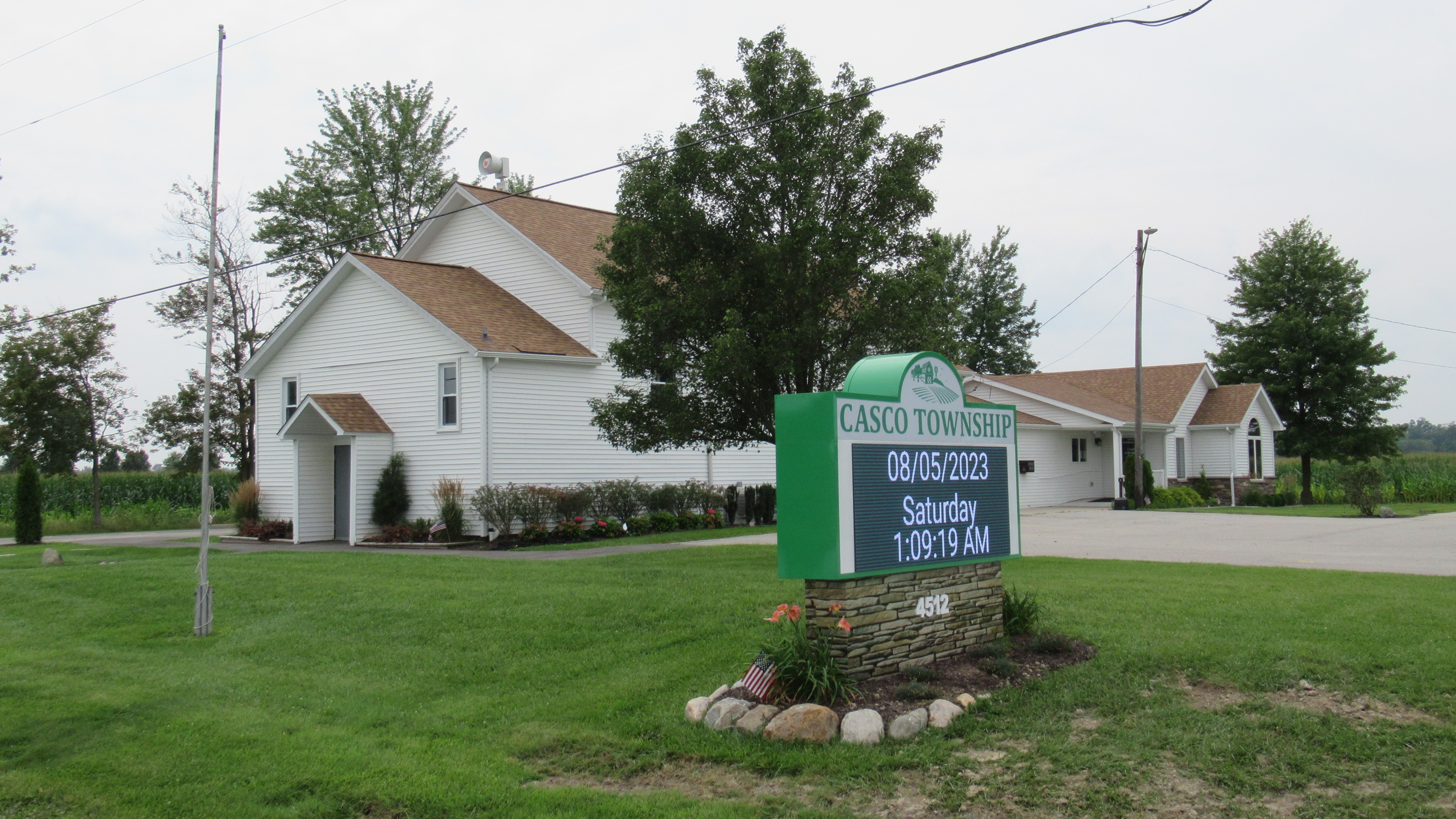
- Casco Township Hall

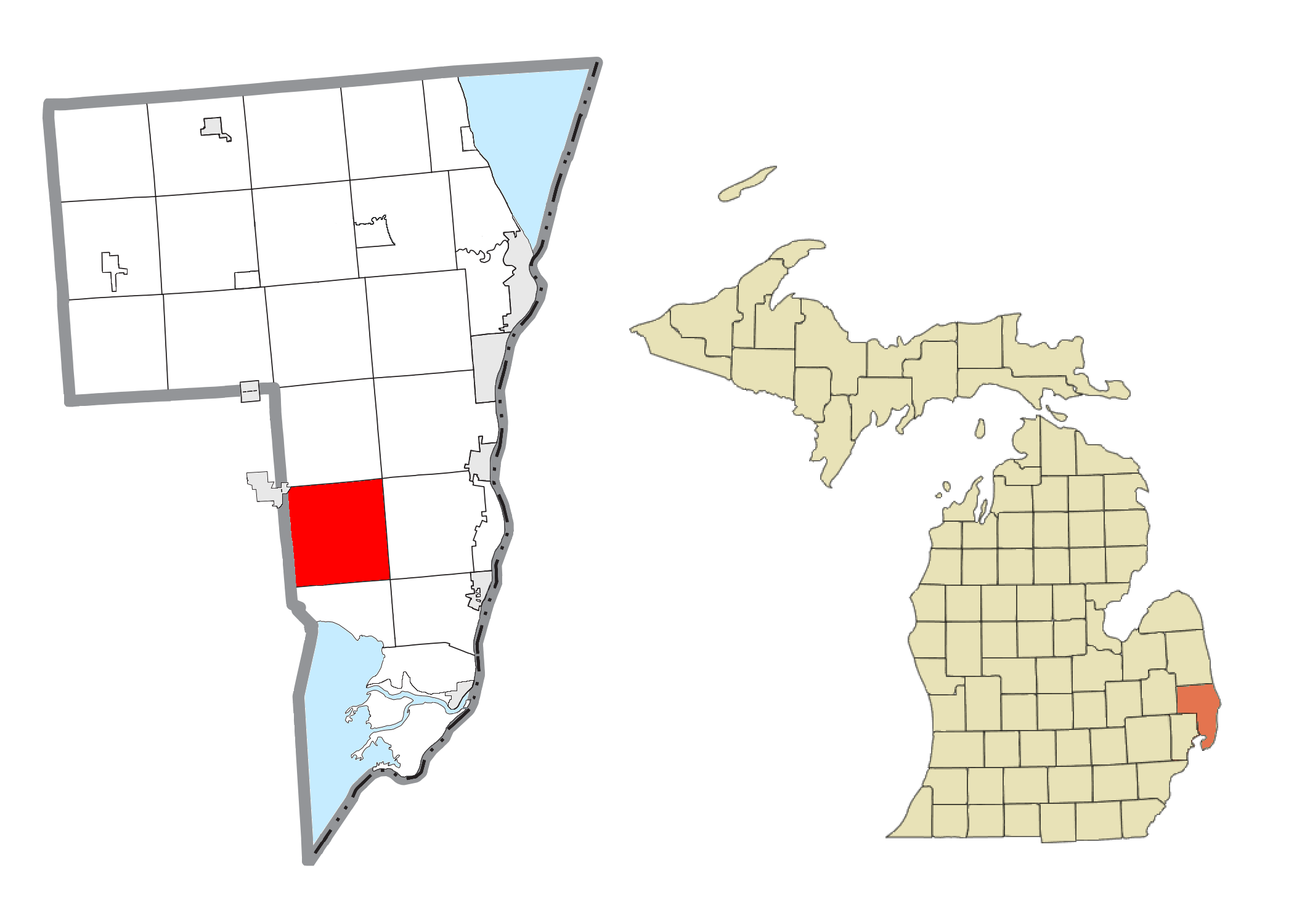
- Location within St. Clair County

- Location within the state of Michigan Location within the United States
- Coordinates: 42°46′25″N 82°40′37″W
- Country: United States
- State: Michigan
- County: St. Clair
- Established: 1849

Government
  - Supervisor: Joseph Stevens
  - Clerk: Jennifer Andersen

Area
  - Total: 37.04 sq mi (95.93 km^{2})
  - Land: 36.88 sq mi (95.52 km^{2})
  - Water: 0.16 sq mi (0.41 km^{2})
- Elevation: 643 ft (196 m)

Population (2020)
  - Total: 3,990
  - Density: 108.2/sq mi (41.8/km^{2})
- Time zone: UTC-5 (Eastern (EST))
  - Summer (DST): UTC-4 (EDT)
- ZIP code(s): 48023 (Fair Haven); 48064 (Casco)
- Area code: 586
- FIPS code: 26-13720
- GNIS feature ID: 1626039
- Website: Official website

Casco Township is a civil township of St. Clair County in the U.S. state of Michigan. As of the 2020 Census, the township population was 3,990.

== History ==
Casco Township was established in 1849.

== Communities ==
There are four unincorporated communities within the Township:

- Adair is located in the northeast part of the township at 42°47′53″N 82°38′02″W. The settlement of this location began circa 1840. It was a station on the Michigan Central Railway and was named by an English contractor who built the branch of the railway here.
- Casco is an unincorporated community in the south central part of the township at 42°45′09″N 82°40′18″W. The first white settlers began arriving in the area before 1840. The township was organized in 1849 and is believed to be named after Casco, Maine, by Captain John Clarke, a transplanted native of that state. A post office operated there from 1854 until 1907.
- Muttonville is located on the western boundary of the township with adjacent Richmond in Macomb County at 42°47′47″N 82°44′07″W. It was so named because it was the principal slaughterhouse for what was predominantly a sheep raising area.
- Peters is an unincorporated community in the southeast part of the township at 42°44′40″N 82°37′54″W. It was originally called "Petersburg" after an early settler, John Peters. Because there was another post office named Petersburg in Michigan, the post office here was named simply "Peters" and operated from 1891 until 1905.

== Geography ==
According to the United States Census Bureau, the township has a total area of 37.1 square miles (96 km^{2}), of which 37.1 square miles (96 km^{2}) is land and 0.04 square miles (0.10 km^{2}) (0.08%) is water.

== Demographics ==
As of the census of 2000, there were 4,747 people, 1,634 households, and 1,294 families residing in the township. The population density was 127.9 inhabitants per square mile (49.4/km^{2}). There were 1,717 housing units at an average density of 46.3 per square mile (17.9/km^{2}). The racial makeup of the township was 96.57% White, 0.51% African American, 0.25% Native American, 0.17% Asian, 0.08% Pacific Islander, 0.17% from other races, and 2.25% from two or more races. Hispanic or Latino of any race were 0.93% of the population.

There were 1,634 households, out of which 38.4% had children under the age of 18 living with them, 64.5% were married couples living together, 9.2% had a female householder with no husband present, and 20.8% were non-families. 16.3% of all households were made up of individuals, and 5.0% had someone living alone who was 65 years of age or older. The average household size was 2.91 and the average family size was 3.24.

In the township the population was spread out, with 28.4% under the age of 18, 8.5% from 18 to 24, 31.8% from 25 to 44, 24.4% from 45 to 64, and 6.9% who were 65 years of age or older. The median age was 35 years. For every 100 females, there were 103.0 males. For every 100 females age 18 and over, there were 103.2 males.

The median income for a household in the township was $52,961, and the median income for a family was $60,598. Males had a median income of $51,042 versus $28,667 for females. The per capita income for the township was $22,299. None of the families and 1.6% of the population were living below the poverty line, including no under eighteens and 3.6% of those over 64.
