= Columbus Township, St. Clair County, Michigan =

Columbus Township, Michigan
- Civil township
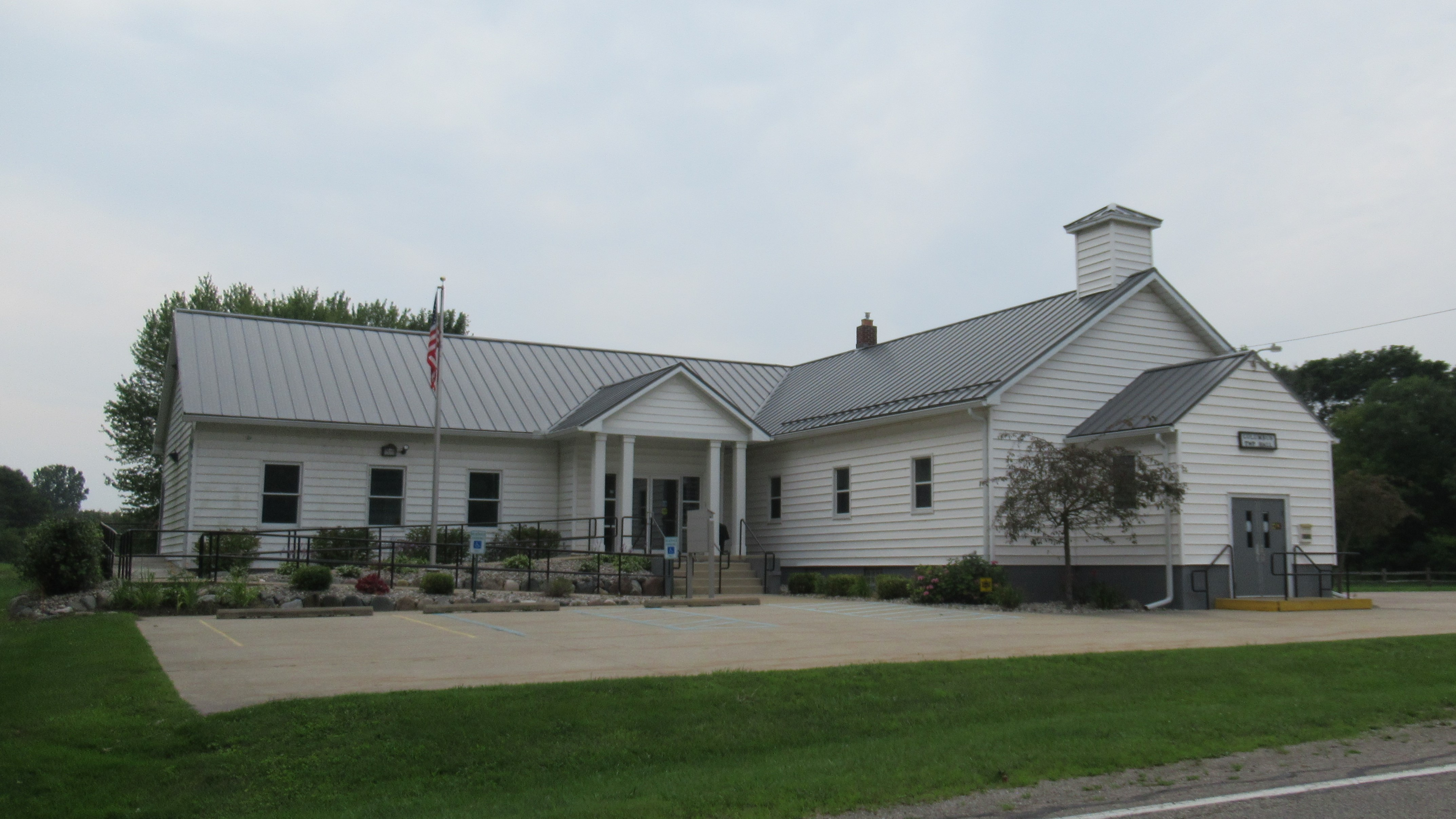
- Columbus Township Hall

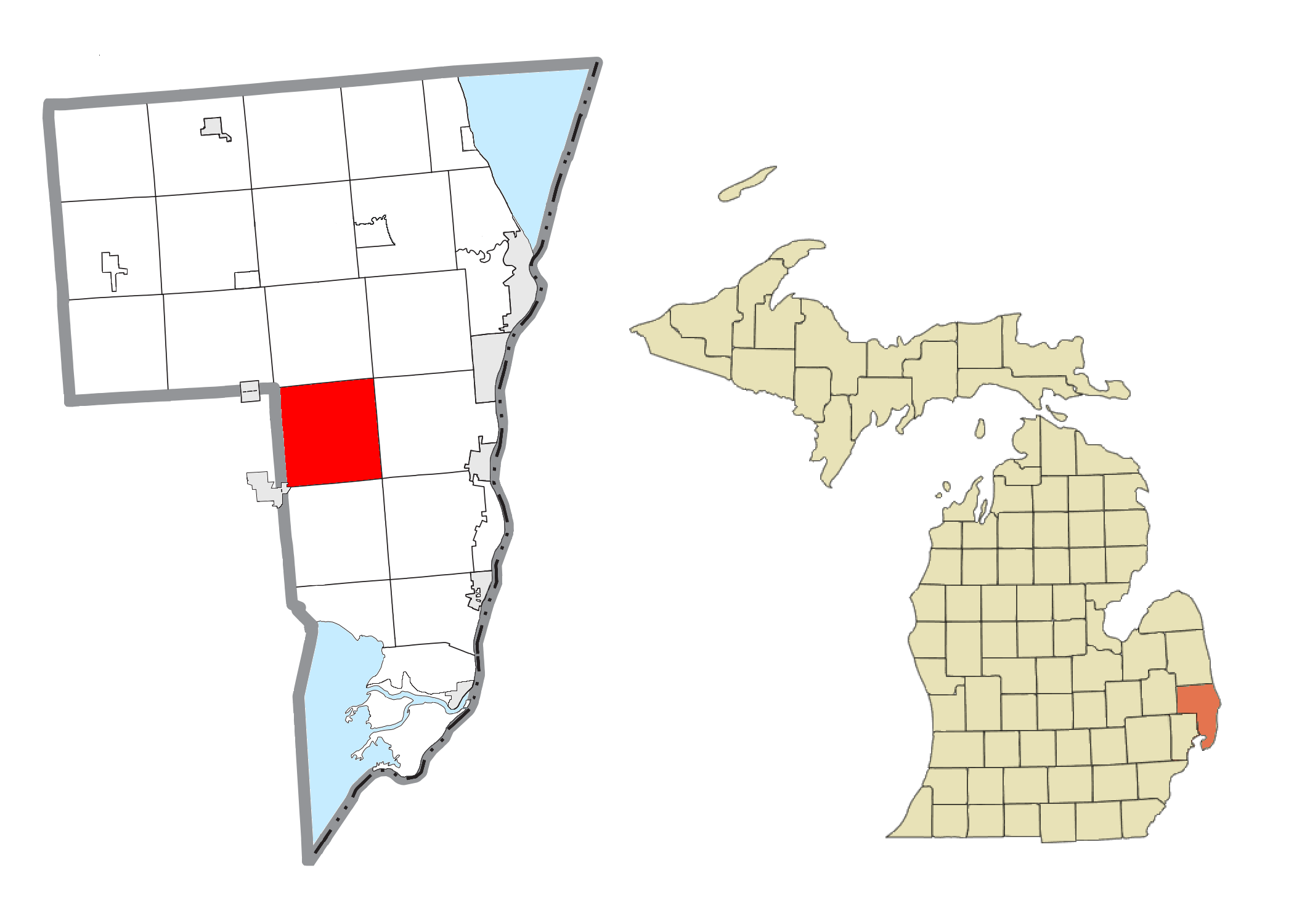
- Location within St. Clair County

- Location within the state of Michigan Location within the United States
- Coordinates: 42°51′16″N 82°40′57″W
- Country: United States
- State: Michigan
- County: St. Clair
- Established: 1849

Government
  - Supervisor: Brad Smith
  - Clerk: Angie Biringer

Area
  - Total: 36.94 sq mi (95.67 km^{2})
  - Land: 36.64 sq mi (94.90 km^{2})
  - Water: 0.30 sq mi (0.78 km^{2})
- Elevation: 669 ft (204 m)

Population (2020)
  - Total: 4,112
  - Density: 112.2/sq mi (43.3/km^{2})
- Time zone: UTC-5 (Eastern (EST))
  - Summer (DST): UTC-4 (EDT)
- ZIP code(s): 48062 (Richmond); 48063 (Columbus)
- Area code: 810
- FIPS code: 26-17520
- GNIS feature ID: 1626123
- Website: Official website

Columbus Township is a civil township of St. Clair County in the U.S. state of Michigan. The population was 4,112 at the 2020 Census.

== Communities ==
- Belle River is an unincorporated community on Gratiot Road, just southwest of where it crosses the Belle River in section 32 in the southeast of the township. It is about 17 miles southwest of Port Huron at 42°49′25″N 82°42′01″W.
- Columbus is an unincorporated community between sections 10 and 11 in the northeast of the township, on Rattle Run Road between Rattle Run and Memphis. It is about 13 miles southwest of Port Huron at 42°52′56″N 82°39′45″W. The ZIP code is 48063.
- Snyderville is an unincorporated community on Gratiot Road, less than two miles northeast of Belle River in section 27 of the township. It is about 15 miles southwest of Port Huron at 42°50′12″N 82°40′17″W.

== Geography ==
According to the United States Census Bureau, the township has a total area of 37.2 square miles (96 km^{2}), of which 37.1 square miles (96 km^{2}) is land and 0.1 square miles (0.26 km^{2}) (0.38%) is water. The Belle River passes through the township and has two tributaries: Gillett Drain and Dawson Drain.

== History ==
The creation of the Fort Gratiot Turnpike, now known as Gratiot Road, in 1832 led to the settlement of Columbus Township. Columbus Township was organized as a township on March 11, 1837. The Township was named for explorer Christopher Columbus, and Theodore Bethey served as the Township's first supervisor. In 1839 the Grand Trunk Western Railroad opened a small train station. In 1859, a 12-year-old Thomas Edison was given his first job, as a newsboy on the Grand Trunk Western Railroad line between Port Huron and Detroit. In 1992, the Richmond Area Historical and Genealogical Society moved the 1900-era Grand Trunk Railroad Depot located in Hickey to the nearby community of Richmond.

In 1845 the population was 315. In 1880, the township's population increased to 1,327, and by 2000 the population had grown to 4,615.

== Demographics ==
As of the census of 2000, there were 4,615 people, 1,533 households, and 1,266 families residing in the township. The population density was 124.4 inhabitants per square mile (48.0/km^{2}). There were 1,595 housing units at an average density of 43.0 per square mile (16.6/km^{2}). The racial makeup of the township was 97.01% White, 0.09% African American, 0.56% Native American, 0.37% Asian, 0.02% Pacific Islander, 0.69% from other races, and 1.26% from two or more races. Hispanic or Latino of any race were 2.30% of the population.

There were 1,533 households, out of which 42.7% had children under the age of 18 living with them, 71.5% were married couples living together, 7.2% had a female householder with no husband present, and 17.4% were non-families. 13.2% of all households were made up of individuals, and 3.8% had someone living alone who was 65 years of age or older. The average household size was 3.00 and the average family size was 3.29.

In the township the population was spread out, with 30.7% under the age of 18, 7.1% from 18 to 24, 32.1% from 25 to 44, 22.9% from 45 to 64, and 7.2% who were 65 years of age or older. The median age was 34 years. For every 100 females, there were 106.5 males. For every 100 females age 18 and over, there were 105.8 males.

The median income for a household in the township was $61,063, and the median income for a family was $65,000. Males had a median income of $46,824 versus $29,931 for females. The per capita income for the township was $21,767. About 2.5% of families and 3.7% of the population were below the poverty line, including 4.1% of those under age 18 and 2.8% of those age 65 or over.

== Parks ==
The township has two parks. Columbus County Park is a 385-acre park that straddles Belle River. It offers fishing, hunting, hiking, sledding, kayaking, and horseback riding opportunities. It also includes a lodge. Funding to purchase Columbus County Park was made possible with a $2.23 million grant from the Michigan Natural Resources Trust Fund. The township's other park is a small roadside park on Gratiot Avenue located alongside the Belle River.
