= Richmond Township, Macomb County, Michigan =

Richmond Township, Michigan
- Civil township
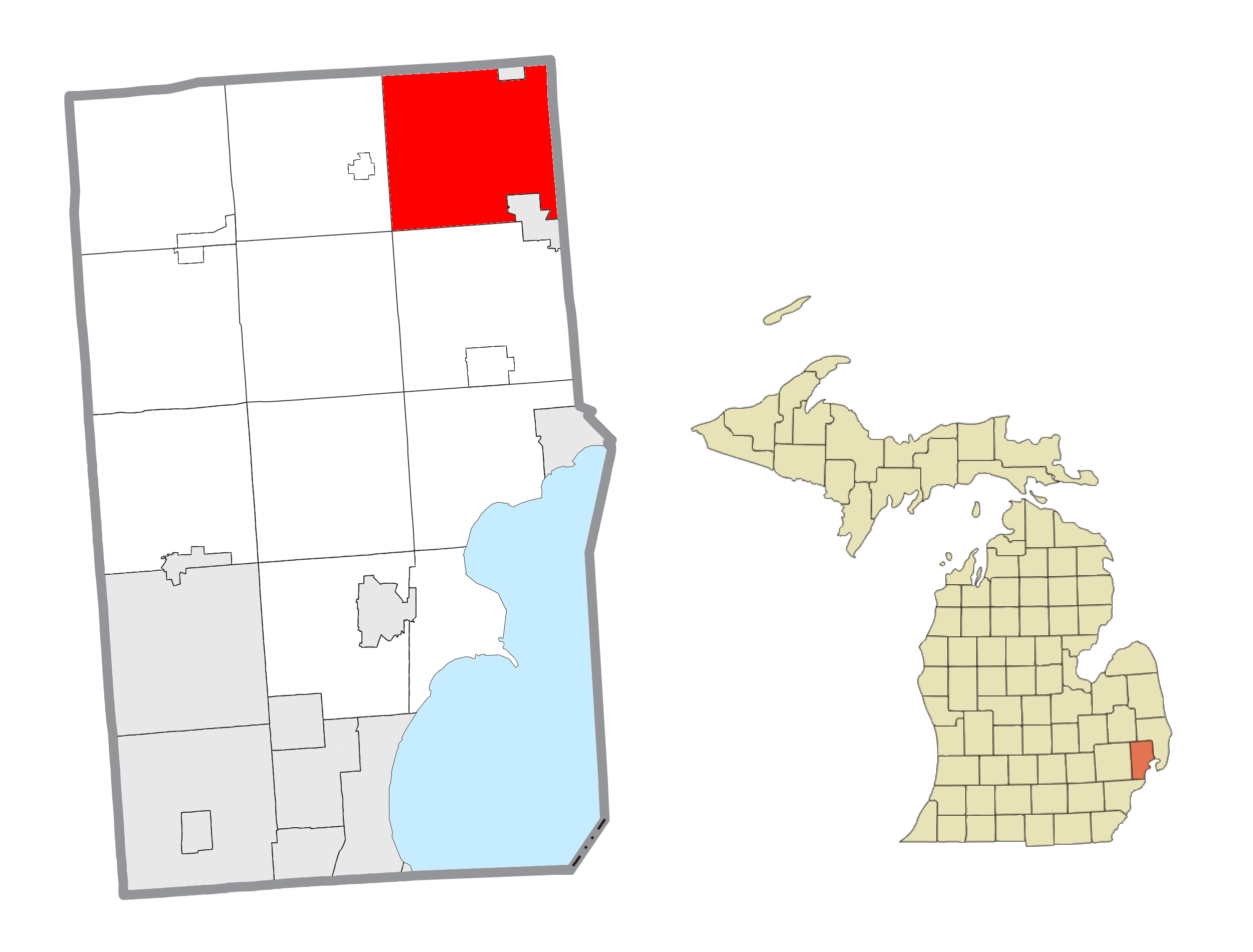
- Location within Macomb County

- Location within Michigan Location within the United States
- Coordinates: 42°51′10″N 82°47′51″W
- Country: United States
- State: Michigan
- County: Macomb

Area
  - Total: 37.52 sq mi (97.2 km^{2})
  - Land: 37.46 sq mi (97.0 km^{2})
  - Water: 0.06 sq mi (0.16 km^{2})
- Elevation: 761 ft (232 m)

Population (2020)
  - Total: 3,544
  - Density: 94.6/sq mi (36.5/km^{2})
- Time zone: UTC-5 (Eastern (EST))
  - Summer (DST): UTC-4 (EDT)
- ZIP Codes: 48062 (Richmond); 48041 (Memphis)
- Area codes: 586 and 810
- FIPS code: 26-68400
- GNIS feature ID: 1626976
- Website: www.richmondtwp.org

Richmond Township is a civil township of Macomb County, Michigan, United States. At the 2020 census, the township population was 3,544, Which makes Richmond Township the least populated township in Macomb County. A portion of the city of Richmond is adjacent to the township, but is administratively autonomous.

== Geography ==
The township is in the northeast corner of Macomb County, bordered to the north and east by St. Clair County. The city of Richmond borders the township to the southeast, while the city of Memphis borders it to the northeast. Mount Clemens, the Macomb county seat, is 21 miles (34 km) to the southwest, while Port Huron is 25 miles (40 km) to the east-northeast.

According to the United States Census Bureau, Richmond Township has a total area of 37.5 square miles (97 km^{2}), of which 0.06 square miles (0.16 km^{2}), or 0.15%, are water. The township is drained to the southwest by tributaries of the Clinton River, which flows to Lake St. Clair east of Mount Clemens, and to the east by tributaries of the Belle River, which flows to the St. Clair River at Marine City.

== Demographics ==
At the 2000 census, there were 3,416 people, 1,020 households and 869 families residing in the township. The population density was 91.7 inhabitants per square mile (35.4/km^{2}). There were 1,060 housing units at an average density of 28.4 per square mile (11.0/km^{2}). The racial makeup of the township was 96.93% White, 0.97% African American, 0.38% Native American, 0.18% Asian, 0.18% from other races, and 1.38% from two or more races. Hispanic or Latino of any race were 1.08% of the population.

There were 1,020 households, of which 42.4% had children under the age of 18 living with them, 76.6% were married couples living together, 5.6% had a female householder with no husband present, and 14.8% were non-families. 11.6% of all households were made up of individuals, and 3.7% had someone living alone who was 65 years of age or older. The average household size was 3.14 and the average family size was 3.39.

Age distribution was 28.0% under the age of 18, 7.7% from 18 to 24, 28.7% from 25 to 44, 24.3% from 45 to 64, and 11.2% who were 65 years of age or older. The median age was 37 years. For every 100 females, there were 102.5 males. For every 100 females age 18 and over, there were 99.4 males.

The median household income was $69,449, and the median family income was $72,500. Males had a median income of $54,205 versus $28,427 for females. The per capita income for the township was $24,937. About 3.3% of families and 5.9% of the population were below the poverty line, including 7.3% of those under age 18 and 14.3% of those age 65 or over.
