= Memphis, Michigan =

- City
- City of Memphis
- Motto: A Pleasant Place to Live
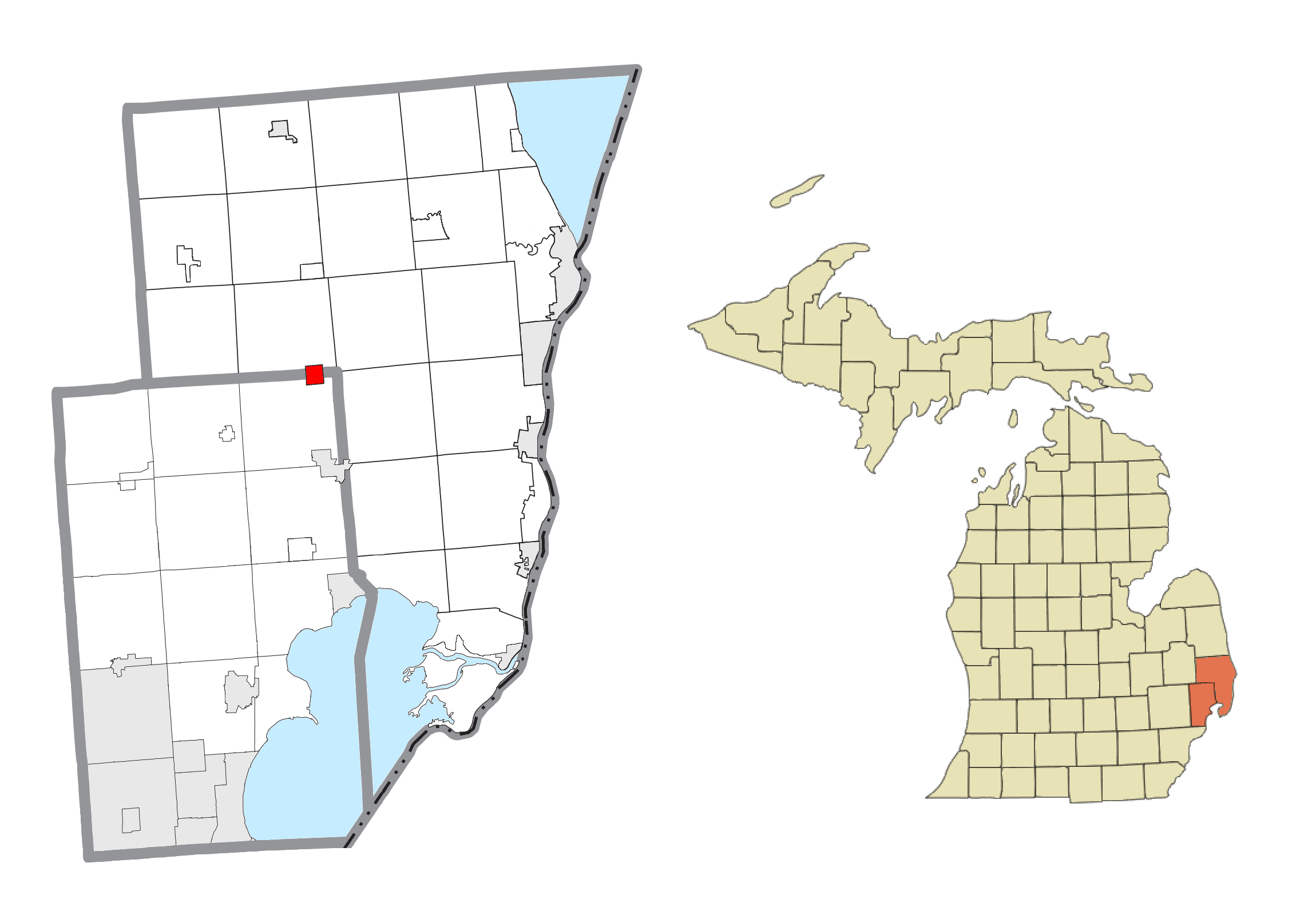
- Location within Macomb County (bottom) and St. Clair County (top)

- Location within the state of Michigan Location within the United States
- Coordinates: 42°53′47″N 82°46′15″W
- Country: United States
- State: Michigan
- Counties: Macomb and St. Clair
- Settled: 1834
- Incorporated: 1865 (village); 1953 (city)

Government
  - Type: Council–manager
  - Mayor: Tammy Wehrum
  - Clerk: Donna Janssens

Area
  - Total: 1.15 sq mi (2.98 km^{2})
  - Land: 1.12 sq mi (2.91 km^{2})
  - Water: 0.031 sq mi (0.08 km^{2})
- Elevation: 750 ft (230 m)

Population (2020)
  - Total: 1,084
  - Density: 964.8/sq mi (372.51/km^{2})
- Time zone: UTC-5 (Eastern (EST))
  - Summer (DST): UTC-4 (EDT)
- ZIP code(s): 48041
- Area code: 810
- FIPS code: 26-52960
- GNIS feature ID: 1624727
- Website: Official website

Memphis is a city that straddles the border between Macomb and St. Clair counties in the U.S. state of Michigan. The population was 1,084 at the 2020 census.

== History ==
The first European Americans to settle in the area of Memphis were members of the Wells family from Albany, New York; Anthony Wells resided here from 1834 and James Wells from 1835. The fledgling community was originally called "Wells Settlement" after them.

The name "Memphis" was chosen and applied in 1848 when a US post office was established. The village was named for its location on a bluff overlooking the Belle River, which settlers likened to the position of the ancient Egyptian Memphis, "the City on the Nile". Memphis was incorporated as a village on April 4, 1865. It did not attain the status of a city until 1953.

The area was originally developed for agriculture, as most settlers were farmers. As lumbering became a major industry in Michigan, log rafts were floated down the Belle River into the St. Clair River and south to Detroit. Some lumber was processed in Memphis and Marine City, where there was a major shipbuilding industry. Much was shipped to developing midwestern cities such as Chicago or to the east.

== Geography ==
Memphis is in the northeast corner of Macomb County and in western St. Clair County, evenly divided between the two. Highway M-19 is Memphis' Main Street, leading north 6 miles (10 km) to Emmett and south the same distance to Richmond. Mount Clemens, the Macomb county seat, is 25 miles (40 km) to the south, while Port Huron, the St. Clair county seat, is 20 miles (32 km) to the east.

According to the U.S. Census Bureau, Memphis has a total area of 1.15 square miles (2.98 km^{2}), of which 1.12 square miles (2.90 km^{2}) are land and 0.03 square miles (0.08 km^{2}), or 2.52%, are water. The Belle River passes through the northern and eastern sides of the city, flowing southeast to join the St. Clair River at Marine City.

== Demographics ==
Historical population
Census	Pop.	Note	%±
1870	385		—
1880	579		50.4%
1890	588		1.6%
1900	586		−0.3%
1910	557		−4.9%
1920	452		−18.9%
1930	574		27.0%
1940	630		9.8%
1950	800		27.0%
1960	996		24.5%
1970	1,121		12.6%
1980	1,171		4.5%
1990	1,221		4.3%
2000	1,129		−7.5%
2010	1,183		4.8%
2020	1,084		−8.4%
U.S. Decennial Census

As of 2000 the median income for a household in the city was $41,705, and the median income for a family was $52,679. Males had a median income of $41,932 versus $27,019 for females. The per capita income for the city was $19,983. About 7.8% of families and 10.0% of the population were below the poverty line, including 10.5% of those under age 18 and 15.9% of those age 65 or over.

=== 2010 census ===
As of the census of 2010, there were 1,183 people, 474 households, and 320 families residing in the city. The population density was 1,056.3 inhabitants per square mile (407.8/km^{2}). There were 514 housing units at an average density of 458.9 per square mile (177.2/km^{2}). The racial makeup of the city was 97.6% White, 0.8% African American, 0.3% Native American, 0.5% from other races, and 0.8% from two or more races. Hispanic or Latino of any race were 2.1% of the population.

There were 474 households, of which 34.8% had children under the age of 18 living with them, 49.8% were married couples living together, 13.9% had a female householder with no husband present, 3.8% had a male householder with no wife present, and 32.5% were non-families. 27.8% of all households were made up of individuals, and 11.9% had someone living alone who was 65 years of age or older. The average household size was 2.47 and the average family size was 3.02.

The median age in the city was 39.4 years. 24.3% of residents were under the age of 18; 7.9% were between the ages of 18 and 24; 26% were from 25 to 44; 27.9% were from 45 to 64; and 13.8% were 65 years of age or older. The gender makeup of the city was 47.8% male and 52.2% female.

== Education ==
The Memphis Community Schools, which covers the entire municipality, operates an elementary school and a junior/senior high school. Its sports teams are nicknamed the Yellowjackets.

Maryglade College was located in Memphis from 1960 until May 1972.

== "The Thing" ==
Over the winter of 1884-1885, local father and son mechanics John and Thomas Clegg constructed a four-seater road vehicle powered by a single-cylinder steam engine with a boiler in the rear. Referred to as "The Thing," the Cleggs' invention was the first recorded instance of an automobile made in Michigan. Through 30 test drives in the summer of 1885, the Cleggs' vehicle proved not to be viable to operate. The state later became the international center of automobile manufacture. A roadside historical marker on the east civic limits of Memphis commemorates the Cleggs' invention.

Inscription on "The Thing" memorial
Thomas Clegg (1863-1939) and his English-born father, John, built "The Thing," the first recorded self-propelled vehicle in Michigan (and perhaps the country) in 1884-85. The Thing, driven by a single-cylinder steam engine, with a tubular boiler carried in the rear, seated four. The vehicle was built in the John Clegg & Son machine shop here in Memphis. It ran about 500 miles (800 km) before Clegg dismantled it and sold the engine to a creamery. The shop was razed in 1936, just a short time before Henry Ford offered to buy it for Greenfield Village.
