= St. Clair Inn =

- U.S. National Register of Historic Places
- Michigan State Historic Site
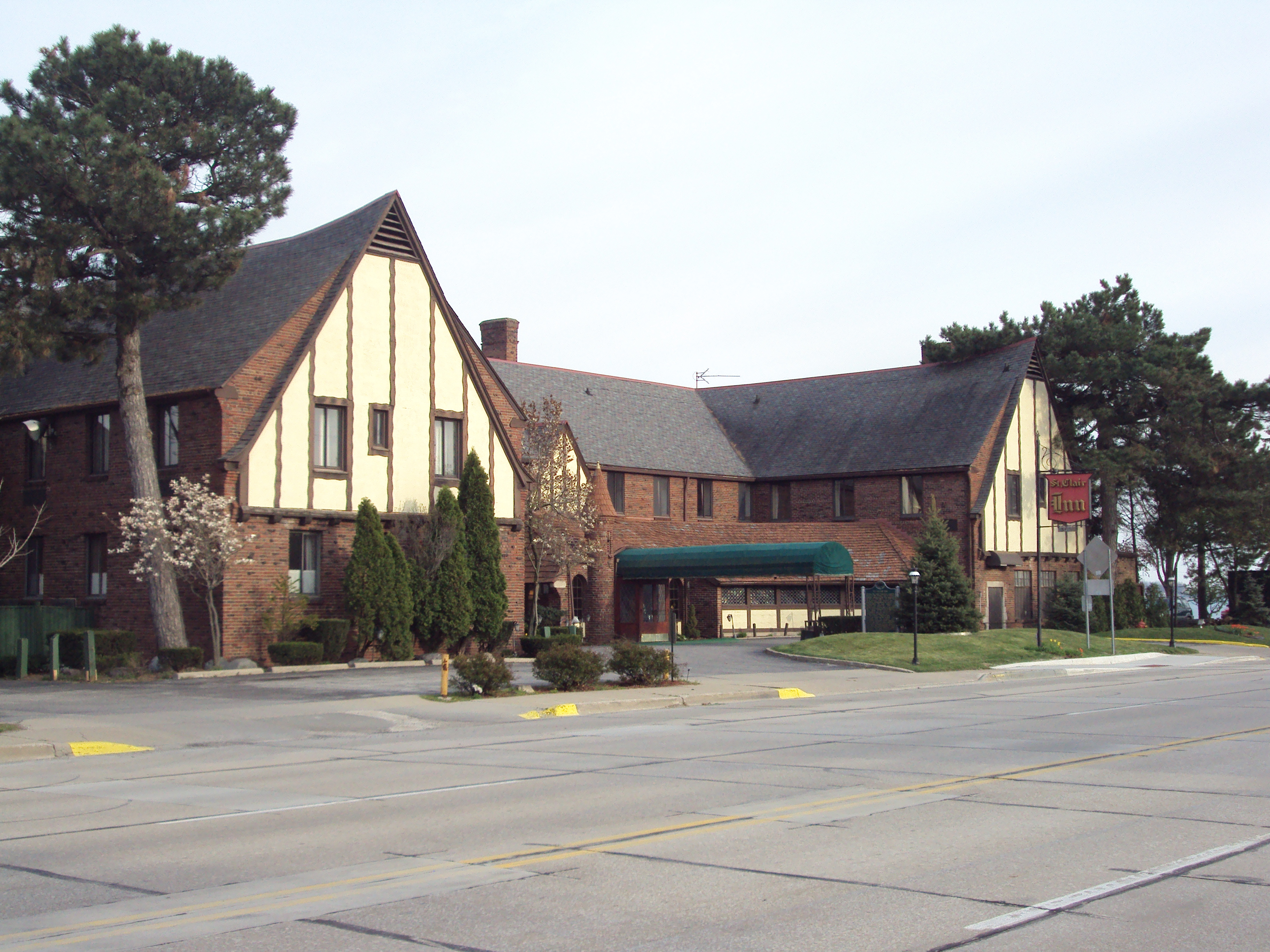

- Location within Michigan Location within the United States
- Interactive map
- Location: 500 N. Riverside Ave., St. Clair, Michigan
- Coordinates: 42°49′40″N 82°29′4″W
- Area: 2 acres (0.81 ha)
- Built: 1926
- Architect: Walter H. Wyeth, F. R. Patterson
- Architectural style: Tudor Revival
- NRHP reference No.: 95000074
- Added to NRHP: July 3, 1995

The St. Clair Inn is a hotel located at 500 North Riverside Avenue in St. Clair, Michigan. It was listed on the National Register of Historic Places in 1995.

== History ==
During the early twentieth century, overnight steamers were common along the St. Clair River. Although by the early 1920s there were four hotels in Port Huron, a group of area businessmen determines that the city lacked enough modern hotel accommodations catering to the river trade. In 1925, they formed the St. Clair Community Hotel Corporation, and proposed building a sixty-room hotel at a cost of approximately $180,000. The corporation went public in mid-1925, and when sufficient funds were raised, they hired local architect Walter H. Wyeth to design the building. Construction was completed in September 1926.

However, the Great Depression was not kind to the Inn, and it went into receivership in 1932. The hotel passed through multiple owners until 1943, when the St. Clair Hotel Corporation regained control of the building. The corporation hired Creighton W. Holden, owner of a local restaurant chain, to manage the hotel. Holden demanded and received majority ownership in the corporation, and by 1948 he and his sons purchased the entire corporation, turning the St. Clair Inn into a private holding. The Holdens retained ownership until 1975. In 1978, a substantial addition was constructed to the inn, and it was later purchased by Thomas Edison Inns Inc. In 2015, Planet Clair Corporation purchased the property, and in 2017 began substantial renovation. They plan to re-open the inn in 2019.

== Description ==
The St. Clair Inn is a two-story, gable-roof, Tudor Revival structure with English brick and half-timbered plaster exterior walls. It is located on the St. Clair River. The building has a U-shaped form, with the arms of the U flanking a shallow courtyard on the street side of the building. The courtyard contains a gabled main entrance, to the left of which is a small whimsical round tower. The roof is shingled, and contains three eyebrow windows on the river side. A 1978 addition is attached to the north side of the hotel, but the original building's exterior is substantially intact.

The interior of the original 1926 inn is also substantially intact. It contains a central lobby with a brick floor and a plastered ceiling displaying rough-hewn timbers. From the lobby, a grayed oak staircase leads to the second floor. The nearby lounge contains two fireplaces: one of English brick with an oak mantel and the other of limestone, containing medieval-themed insets between the fireplace opening and the mantel. The main dining room is nearby; what was originally a porch has been enclosed. The 1926 inn contains sixty guest rooms. The basement contains the physical plant, linen rooms, laundry, and bakery.
