= 1996 Michigan House of Representatives election =

- November 6, 1996

All 110 seats in the Michigan House of Representatives 56 seats needed for a majority
	Majority party	Minority party
Leader	Curtis Hertel	Paul Hillegonds (retired)
Party	Democratic	Republican
Leader since	1993	1987
Leader's seat	2nd district	88th district
Last election	54	56
Seats before	53	55
Seats after	58	52
Seat change	▲5	▼3
Popular vote	1,870,533	1,725,510
Percentage	51.62%	47.62%
Speaker before election
Paul Hillegonds
Republican
Elected Speaker
Curtis Hertel
Democratic

An election was held on November 5, 1996, to elect all 110 members of the Michigan House of Representatives for the 89th Michigan Legislature. In the election, the Democrats won a 58–52 majority from what had previously been a Republican majority.

== History ==
In the 1994 general election, the Republicans won a 56–54 majority over the Democrats, from what had previously been an even 55–55 split between the two major parties. In June 1996, Republican Bill Bullard Jr. was elected to the state Senate in a special election. In October 1996, Democrat Robert DeMars died in office. This left the partisan make-up before the 1996 general election at a 55–53 Republican majority.

The 1996 state primary election was held on August 6. Sixteen incumbents, nine Republicans, and seven Democrats, had chosen not to run for re-election. There were 31 incumbents who faced challengers in primary elections, 18 Democrats and 13 Republicans. There were 3 incumbents unseated, 2 Democrats and 1 Republican. Democratic incumbent Lloyd F. Weeks was defeated by Paul Wojno. Democratic incumbent Nelson Saunders was defeated by Buzz Thomas. Republican incumbent Roland Jersevic was defeated by Jerome Burns.

The general election was held on November 5. The Democrats had won a 58–52 majority over the Republicans. Four seats were flipped, and they were all won by Democrats. Democrat Bob Brown unseated Republican incumbent James Ryan. Democrat Rose Bogardus unseated Republican incumbent Sandra Hill. Democrat Mark Schauer unseated incumbent Republican Eric Bush. Democrat A.T. Frank defeated Jerome Burns, winning the open seat. Following the election, Democrat Curtis Hertel was elected as speaker of the state House. Republicans picked Ken Sikkema as minority leader.

The state House was sworn in on January 8, 1997. There were 23 freshman legislators in the new state House.

== Results ==
The following are the results from the Michigan Secretary of State.

=== Statewide ===
Party	Candi- dates	Votes		Seats		
Party	Candi- dates	No.	%	No.	+/–	%
Democratic Party	110	1,870,533	51.62%	58	▲5	52.72%
Republican Party	110	1,725,510	47.62%	52	▼3	47.27%
Libertarian Party	19	20,718	0.57%	0	Steady	0.00%
Independents	5	4,104	0.11%	0	Steady	0.00%
Write-ins		1,653	0.04%	0	Steady	0.00%
Workers World Party	2	672	0.01%	0	Steady	0.00%
Total	246	3,623,190	100.00%	110	Steady	100.00%

=== By district ===
1st District (Wayne County)
Party	Candidate	Votes	%
Republican	Andrew Richner	23,493	60.96
Democratic	Elaine Hartmann	14,737	38.24
Workers World	Kristen Hamel	303	0.78
Write-in		2	0.00
Total votes		38,535	100.0
Republican hold			

2nd District (Wayne County)
Party	Candidate	Votes	%
Democratic	Curtis Hertel (incumbent)	18,517	91.32
Republican	Patrick Kukla	1,758	8.67
Write-in		1	0.00
Total votes		20,276	100.0
Democratic hold			

3rd District (Wayne County)
Party	Candidate	Votes	%
Democratic	Mary Lou Parks (incumbent)	20,940	95.46
Republican	Marlyss Landeros	992	4.52
Write-in		2	0.00
Total votes		21,934	100.0
Democratic hold			

4th District (Wayne County)
Party	Candidate	Votes	%
Democratic	Edward Vaughn (incumbent)	20,127	96.13
Republican	Donna Wawrzyniak	810	3.86
Total votes		20,937	100.0
Democratic hold			

5th District (Wayne County)
Party	Candidate	Votes	%
Democratic	Ted Wallace (incumbent)	20,431	94.26
Republican	Yolanda Haynes	1,242	5.73
Total votes		21,673	100.0
Democratic hold			

6th District (Wayne County)
Party	Candidate	Votes	%
Democratic	Martha G. Scott (incumbent)	19,269	92.83
Republican	Raymond Prus	1,479	7.12
Write-in		8	0.03
Total votes		20,756	100.0
Democratic hold			

7th District (Wayne County)
Party	Candidate	Votes	%
Democratic	Raymond M. Murphy (incumbent)	22,404	96.17
Republican	Willie Campbell	889	3.81
Write-in		1	0.00
Total votes		23,294	100.0
Democratic hold			

8th District (Wayne County)
Party	Candidate	Votes	%
Democratic	Ilona Varga (incumbent)	14,631	90.61
Republican	Cheryl Fobbs-Lewis	1,516	9.38
Total votes		16,147	100.0
Democratic hold			

9th District (Wayne County)
Party	Candidate	Votes	%
Democratic	Kwame Kilpatrick	20,800	95.33
Republican	Edward Romanowski	1,017	4.66
Total votes		21,817	100.0
Democratic hold			

10th District (Wayne County)
Party	Candidate	Votes	%
Democratic	Buzz Thomas	28,913	94.54
Republican	Richard Henry	799	2.61
Independent	Kenneth Johnson	664	2.17
Independent	Larry Williams	204	0.66
Total votes		30,580	100.0
Democratic hold			

11th District (Wayne County)
Party	Candidate	Votes	%
Democratic	Morris Hood Jr. (incumbent)	23,460	93.80
Republican	Raquel Reardon	1,548	6.18
Write-in		1	0.00
Total votes		25,009	100.0
Democratic hold			

12th District (Wayne County)
Party	Candidate	Votes	%
Democratic	Keith Stallworth	28,526	95.88
Republican	Larry Davis	1,216	4.08
Write-in		9	0.03
Total votes		29,751	100.0
Democratic hold			

13th District (Wayne County)
Party	Candidate	Votes	%
Democratic	Burton Leland (incumbent)	19,865	90.76
Republican	Gregory Riffle	2,021	9.23
Write-in		1	0.00
Total votes		21,887	100.0
Democratic hold			

14th District (Wayne County)
Party	Candidate	Votes	%
Democratic	Derrick Hale	19,201	90.69
Republican	Catherine Starks	1,969	9.30
Total votes		21,170	100.0
Democratic hold			

15th District (Wayne County)
Party	Candidate	Votes	%
Democratic	Agnes Dobronski (incumbent)	21,047	55.09
Republican	Gary Woronchak	15,597	40.82
Libertarian	Paul Kane	1,559	4.08
Write-in		1	0.00
Total votes		38,204	100.0
Democratic hold			

16th District (Wayne County)
Party	Candidate	Votes	%
Democratic	Bob Brown	18,345	50.28
Republican	James Ryan (incumbent)	18,135	49.71
Total votes		36,480	100.0
Democratic gain from Republican			

17th District (Wayne County)
Party	Candidate	Votes	%
Democratic	Thomas Kelly (incumbent)	18,694	76.60
Republican	Diane Dore	5,709	23.39
Total votes		24,403	100.0
Democratic hold			

18th District (Wayne County)
Party	Candidate	Votes	%
Democratic	Eileen DeHart (incumbent)	15,306	60.57
Republican	Dennis LeMaitre	9,959	39.41
Write-in		3	0.01
Total votes		25,268	100.0
Democratic hold			

19th District (Wayne County)
Party	Candidate	Votes	%
Republican	Lyn Bankes (incumbent)	22,047	59.26
Democratic	Patrick McRae	13,871	37.28
Libertarian	John Tatar	1,261	3.38
Write-in		19	0.05
Total votes		37,198	100.0
Republican hold			

20th District (Wayne County)
Party	Candidate	Votes	%
Republican	Gerald H. Law (incumbent)	29,875	68.73
Democratic	Deborah Hoadley	13,580	31.24
Write-in		11	0.02
Total votes		43,466	100.0
Republican hold			

21st District (Wayne County)
Party	Candidate	Votes	%
Republican	Deborah Whyman (incumbent)	17,923	54.39
Democratic	Deborah Nesbit	15,022	45.59
Write-in		2	0.00
Total votes		32,947	100.0
Republican hold			

22nd District (Wayne County)
Party	Candidate	Votes	%
Democratic	Gregory Pitoniak (incumbent)	18,515	73.53
Republican	Matthew Ruffner	4,890	19.42
Independent	Susan Cislo	1,771	7.03
Write-in		3	0.01
Total votes		25,179	100.0
Democratic hold			

23rd District (Wayne County)
Party	Candidate	Votes	%
Democratic	George Mans	18,595	51.52
Republican	Edward Nykiel	16,877	46.76
Libertarian	Brad Tidik	615	1.70
Write-in		2	0.00
Total votes		36,089	100.0
Democratic hold			

24th District (Wayne County)
Party	Candidate	Votes	%
Democratic	Joseph Palamara (incumbent)	21,683	67.71
Republican	Raymond Krutsch	5,298	16.54
Libertarian	Jon Coon	5,042	15.74
Total votes		32,023	100.0
Democratic hold			

25th District (Wayne County)
Party	Candidate	Votes	%
Democratic	Gloria Schermesser (Note: Initially, incumbent Democrat Robert DeMars ran for re-election. He died on October 21. Gloria Schermesser was picked by the Wayne County Democratic Party to replace him on the ballot.)	19,464	70.39
Republican	William Beddoes	7,292	26.37
Libertarian	Loel Gnadt	875	3.16
Write-in		18	0.06
Total votes		27,649	100.0
Democratic hold			

26th District (Macomb County)
Party	Candidate	Votes	%
Democratic	William Callahan	19,831	51.70
Republican	Peter Lund	17,343	45.21
Libertarian	Keith Edwards	811	2.11
Workers World	Beverley Bloedel	369	0.96
Total votes		38,354	100.0
Democratic hold			

27th District (Macomb County)
Party	Candidate	Votes	%
Democratic	Nick Ciaramitaro (incumbent)	22,215	67.71
Republican	James Zelmanski	9,667	29.46
Libertarian	Thomas Sydlow	925	2.81
Write-in		2	0.00
Total votes		32,809	100.0
Democratic hold			

28th District (Macomb County)
Party	Candidate	Votes	%
Democratic	Paul Wojno	19,768	72.19
Republican	Dan Nixon	7,610	27.79
Write-in		4	0.01
Total votes		27,382	100.0
Democratic hold			

29th District (Macomb County)
Party	Candidate	Votes	%
Democratic	Dennis Olshove (incumbent)	23,927	61.79
Republican	Steve Rice	14,249	36.79
Libertarian	Mathew Ignash	545	1.40
Total votes		38,721	100.0
Democratic hold			

30th District (Macomb County)
Party	Candidate	Votes	%
Republican	Sue Rocca (incumbent)	20,670	60.27
Democratic	Ed Oberski	13,621	39.72
Total votes		34,291	100.0
Republican hold			

31st District (Macomb County)
Party	Candidate	Votes	%
Democratic	Sharon Gire (incumbent)	21,978	66.16
Republican	Donald DeNault Jr.	11,237	33.83
Write-in		1	0.00
Total votes		33,216	100.0
Democratic hold			

32nd District (Macomb County)
Party	Candidate	Votes	%
Republican	David Jaye (incumbent)	23,603	58.29
Democratic	Dick Kennedy	15,355	37.92
Libertarian	Bob Van Oast	807	1.99
Independent	Douglas Young	724	1.78
Write-in		3	0.00
Total votes		40,492	100.0
Republican hold			

33rd District (Macomb County)
Party	Candidate	Votes	%
Republican	Alvin H. Kukuk (incumbent)	23,830	59.58
Democratic	Joel Leach	16,151	40.38
Write-in		10	0.02
Total votes		39,991	100.0
Republican hold			

34th District (Oakland County)
Party	Candidate	Votes	%
Democratic	John Freeman (incumbent)	18,665	65.29
Republican	Mike Andrzejak	9,919	34.69
Write-in		2	0.00
Total votes		28,586	100.0
Democratic hold			

35th District (Oakland County)
Party	Candidate	Votes	%
Democratic	David Gubow (incumbent)	24,632	75.84
Republican	David Fleetham	7,809	24.04
Write-in		34	0.10
Total votes		32,475	100.0
Democratic hold			

36th District (Oakland County)
Party	Candidate	Votes	%
Democratic	Nancy L. Quarles	26,550	77.90
Republican	Roderick Fracassi	7,528	22.09
Total votes		34,078	100.0
Democratic hold			

37th District (Oakland County)
Party	Candidate	Votes	%
Republican	Rocky Raczkowski	23,202	58.10
Democratic	Stephen Dibert	16,506	41.33
Write-in		224	0.56
Total votes		39,932	100.0
Republican hold			

38th District (Oakland County)
Party	Candidate	Votes	%
Republican	Nancy Cassis	25,152	67.66
Democratic	Gary Johnson	12,020	32.33
Write-in		1	0.00
Total votes		37,173	100.0
Republican hold			

39th District (Oakland County)
Party	Candidate	Votes	%
Republican	Barbara Dobb (incumbent)	26,333	60.37
Democratic	Sheri Katzman	17,239	39.52
Write-in		47	0.10
Total votes		43,619	100.0
Republican hold			

40th District (Oakland County)
Party	Candidate	Votes	%
Republican	Patricia Godchaux	32,453	71.44
Democratic	Lynn Shecter	12,889	28.37
Write-in		81	0.17
Total votes		45,423	100.0
Republican hold			

41st District (Oakland County)
Party	Candidate	Votes	%
Republican	Shirley Johnson (incumbent)	24,596	66.84
Democratic	Gary Kohut	12,185	33.11
Write-in		14	0.03
Total votes		36,795	100.0
Republican hold			

42nd District (Oakland County)
Party	Candidate	Votes	%
Republican	Greg Kaza (incumbent)	25,547	70.29
Democratic	Brian Etzel	10,790	29.69
Write-in		4	0.01
Total votes		36,341	100.0
Republican hold			

43rd District (Oakland County)
Party	Candidate	Votes	%
Democratic	Hubert Price Jr. (incumbent)	17,007	74.59
Republican	Elsie Bigger	5,790	25.39
Write-in		1	0.00
Total votes		22,798	100.0
Democratic hold			

44th District (Oakland County)
Party	Candidate	Votes	%
Republican	David Galloway (incumbent)	23,919	64.32
Democratic	George Montgomery	13,260	35.66
Write-in		5	0.01
Total votes		37,184	100.0
Republican hold			

45th District (Oakland County)
Party	Candidate	Votes	%
Republican	Penny Crissman (incumbent)	29,640	74.16
Democratic	Paul Sweda	10,314	25.80
Write-in		9	0.02
Total votes		39,963	100.0
Republican hold			

46th District (Oakland County)
Party	Candidate	Votes	%
Republican	Tom F. Middleton (incumbent)	25,600	66.77
Democratic	Jeff Dupuis	12,725	33.19
Write-in		10	0.02
Total votes		38,335	100.0
Republican hold			

47th District (Genesee County)
Party	Candidate	Votes	%
Democratic	Rose Bogardus	20,064	50.24
Republican	Sandra Hill (incumbent)	18,887	47.29
Libertarian	Richard Frost	984	2.46
Write-in		1	0.00
Total votes		39,936	100.0
Democratic gain from Republican			

48th District (Genesee County)
Party	Candidate	Votes	%
Democratic	Vera B. Rison	23,920	89.43
Republican	John Callahan	2,825	10.56
Total votes		26,745	100.0
Democratic hold			

49th District (Genesee County)
Party	Candidate	Votes	%
Democratic	Robert L. Emerson (incumbent)	20,998	78.54
Republican	Michael Bancroft	5,735	21.45
Total votes		26,733	100.0
Democratic hold			

50th District (Genesee County)
Party	Candidate	Votes	%
Democratic	Deborah Cherry (incumbent)	23,009	63.21
Republican	Chris Pavelich	12,815	35.20
Libertarian	Joseph Smolinski	573	1.57
Total votes		36,397	100.0
Democratic hold			

51st District (Genesee County)
Party	Candidate	Votes	%
Democratic	Candace A. Curtis (incumbent)	26,349	66.96
Republican	Jeffrey Goodrich	12,995	33.02
Write-in		1	0.00
Total votes		39,345	100.0
Democratic hold			

52nd District (Washtenaw County)
Party	Candidate	Votes	%
Democratic	Mary Schroer (incumbent)	25,200	64.35
Republican	David Felbeck	13,954	35.63
Write-in		2	0.00
Total votes		39,156	100.0
Democratic hold			

53rd District (Washtenaw County)
Party	Candidate	Votes	%
Democratic	Elizabeth Brater (incumbent)	24,733	69.38
Republican	Chris Schmitt	10,889	30.54
Write-in		22	0.06
Total votes		35,644	100.0
Democratic hold			

54th District (Washtenaw County)
Party	Candidate	Votes	%
Democratic	Kirk Profit (incumbent)	19,371	70.26
Republican	Thomas Banks	7,487	27.15
Libertarian	Michael Wirick	710	2.57
Total votes		27,568	100.0
Democratic hold			

55th District (Lenawee County, Monroe County, Washtenaw County)
Party	Candidate	Votes	%
Republican	Beverly Hammerstrom (incumbent)	21,042	58.02
Democratic	Georgene Campbell	15,185	41.87
Write-in		37	0.10
Total votes		36,264	100.0
Republican hold			

56th District (Monroe County)
Party	Candidate	Votes	%
Democratic	Lynn Owen (incumbent)	17,650	58.41
Republican	Randy Richardville	12,522	41.44
Write-in		41	0.13
Total votes		30,213	100.0
Democratic hold			

57th District (Lenawee County)
Party	Candidate	Votes	%
Republican	Tim Walberg (Note: A recount in December affirmed Tim Walberg's victory.) (incumbent)	16,843	50.36
Democratic	Doug Spade	16,596	49.62
Write-in		5	0.01
Total votes		33,444	100.0
Republican hold			

58th District (Branch County, Hillsdale County)
Party	Candidate	Votes	%
Republican	Michael Nye (incumbent)	21,163	73.67
Democratic	Iva Heim	7,557	26.30
Write-in		3	0.01
Total votes		28,723	100.0
Republican hold			

59th District (Cass County, St. Joseph County)
Party	Candidate	Votes	%
Republican	Glenn Oxender (incumbent)	20,530	69.07
Democratic	Burke Webb	9,181	30.88
Write-in		12	0.04
Total votes		29,723	100.0
Republican hold			

60th District (Kalamazoo County)
Party	Candidate	Votes	%
Democratic	Ed LaForge (incumbent)	16,848	61.24
Republican	Martin Gagie	10,660	38.75
Total votes		27,508	100.0
Democratic hold			

61st District (Kalamazoo County)
Party	Candidate	Votes	%
Republican	Charles R. Perricone (incumbent)	27,418	62.89
Democratic	Bob Goodwin	16,178	37.10
Total votes		43,596	100.0
Republican hold			

62nd District (Calhoun County)
Party	Candidate	Votes	%
Democratic	Mark Schauer	17,520	55.04
Republican	Eric Bush (incumbent)	14,301	44.92
Write-in		10	0.03
Total votes		31,831	100.0
Democratic gain from Republican			

63rd District (Calhoun County, Kalamazoo County)
Party	Candidate	Votes	%
Republican	Donald Gilmer (incumbent)	22,590	62.02
Democratic	Duane Richardson	13,816	37.93
Write-in		14	0.03
Total votes		36,420	100.0
Republican hold			

64th District (Jackson County)
Party	Candidate	Votes	%
Democratic	Michael Griffin (incumbent)	15,853	62.71
Republican	Mike Rand	9,423	37.27
Write-in		2	0.00
Total votes		25,278	100.0
Democratic hold			

65th District (Eaton County, Jackson County)
Party	Candidate	Votes	%
Republican	Clyde LeTarte (incumbent)	19,914	62.37
Democratic	Francis Yettaw	11,990	37.55
Write-in		21	0.06
Total votes		31,925	100.0
Republican hold			

66th District (Livingston County)
Party	Candidate	Votes	%
Republican	Judith Scranton	27,904	69.36
Democratic	Bob Trockley	10,741	26.70
Libertarian	Edward Wallace	1,578	3.92
Write-in		4	0.00
Total votes		40,227	100.0
Republican hold			

67th District (Ingham County, Livingston County)
Party	Candidate	Votes	%
Republican	Dan Gustafson (incumbent)	21,872	68.60
Democratic	Winifred Motherwell	10,010	31.39
Total votes		31,882	100.0
Republican hold			

68th District (Ingham County)
Party	Candidate	Votes	%
Democratic	Lingg Brewer (incumbent)	17,424	59.86
Republican	Priscilla Peterson	10,940	37.58
Independent	Michelle Brown	741	2.54
Write-in		2	0.00
Total votes		29,107	100.0
Democratic hold			

69th District (Ingham County)
Party	Candidate	Votes	%
Democratic	Lynne Martinez (incumbent)	14,559	69.27
Republican	Tom Rasmusson	6,453	30.70
Write-in		3	0.01
Total votes		21,015	100.0
Democratic hold			

70th District (Ingham County)
Party	Candidate	Votes	%
Democratic	Laura Baird (incumbent)	17,828	61.89
Republican	Jeffrey Ross	9,935	34.49
Libertarian	Michael Brinkman	1,037	3.60
Write-in		2	0.00
Total votes		28,802	100.0
Democratic hold			

71st District (Eaton County)
Party	Candidate	Votes	%
Republican	Frank M. Fitzgerald (incumbent)	24,053	61.62
Democratic	Rosemary DiPonio	14,944	38.28
Write-in		32	0.08
Total votes		39,029	100.0
Republican hold			

72nd District (Kent County)
Party	Candidate	Votes	%
Republican	Mark Jansen	30,529	71.94
Democratic	Judy Crandall	11,819	27.85
Write-in		84	0.19
Total votes		42,432	100.0
Republican hold			

73rd District (Kent County)
Party	Candidate	Votes	%
Republican	Jack Horton (incumbent)	31,478	71.12
Democratic	Harry Kooyman	12,721	28.74
Write-in		60	0.13
Total votes		44,259	100.0
Republican hold			

74th District (Kent County, Ottawa County)
Party	Candidate	Votes	%
Republican	Ken Sikkema (incumbent)	28,996	73.10
Democratic	Al Nielsen	10,602	26.72
Write-in		66	0.16
Total votes		39,664	100.0
Republican hold			

75th District (Kent County)
Party	Candidate	Votes	%
Republican	William Byl (incumbent)	20,463	60.60
Democratic	Lorna Zaagman	13,304	39.39
Total votes		33,767	100.0
Republican hold			

76th District (Kent County)
Party	Candidate	Votes	%
Democratic	Thomas Mathieu (incumbent)	17,753	63.73
Republican	Michael DeVriendt	10,102	36.26
Total votes		27,855	100.0
Democratic hold			

77th District (Kent County)
Party	Candidate	Votes	%
Republican	Harold Voorhees (incumbent)	16,808	56.42
Democratic	Karl Holzhueter	12,980	43.57
Total votes		29,788	100.0
Republican hold			

78th District (Berrien County)
Party	Candidate	Votes	%
Republican	Ron Jelinek	18,094	63.89
Democratic	Bill Gorman	9,229	32.58
Libertarian	Thomas Baker	971	3.42
Write-in		25	0.08
Total votes		28,319	100.0
Republican hold			

79th District (Berrien County)
Party	Candidate	Votes	%
Republican	Bob Brackenridge (incumbent)	17,989	63.37
Democratic	Emily Strayhorn	10,339	36.42
Write-in		59	0.20
Total votes		28,387	100.0
Republican hold			

80th District (Cass County, Van Buren County)
Party	Candidate	Votes	%
Republican	James Middaugh (incumbent)	20,656	65.83
Democratic	Cedrick Dwyer	10,718	34.16
Total votes		31,374	100.0
Republican hold			

81st District (St. Clair County)
Party	Candidate	Votes	%
Republican	Terry London (incumbent)	19,036	53.94
Democratic	Howard Heidemann	16,249	46.05
Total votes		35,285	100.0
Republican hold			

82nd District (Lapeer County, St. Clair County)
Party	Candidate	Votes	%
Democratic	Karen Willard (incumbent)	19,705	54.32
Republican	Christina Clark	16,565	45.67
Write-in		1	0.00
Total votes		36,271	100.0
Democratic hold			

83rd District (Lapeer County, Sanilac County)
Party	Candidate	Votes	%
Republican	Kim Rhead (incumbent)	21,653	64.18
Democratic	John Espinoza	12,080	35.80
Write-in		2	0.00
Total votes		33,735	100.0
Republican hold			

84th District (Huron County, Tuscola County)
Party	Candidate	Votes	%
Republican	Mike Green (incumbent)	21,009	62.76
Democratic	Deborah Elliott	12,465	37.23
Total votes		33,474	100.0
Republican hold			

85th District (Clinton County, Shiawassee County)
Party	Candidate	Votes	%
Democratic	Clark Harder (incumbent)	17,828	54.61
Republican	Larry Julian	13,974	42.80
Libertarian	Max Dollarhite	833	2.55
Write-in		10	0.03
Total votes		32,645	100.0
Democratic hold			

86th District (Clinton County, Ionia County)
Party	Candidate	Votes	%
Republican	Alan Cropsey (incumbent)	21,796	63.97
Democratic	Mark Lankford	12,262	35.99
Write-in		9	0.02
Total votes		34,067	100.0
Republican hold			

87th District (Barry County, Ionia County)
Party	Candidate	Votes	%
Republican	Terry Geiger (incumbent)	19,087	64.81
Democratic	Larry Raffler	10,360	35.17
Write-in		2	0.00
Total votes		29,449	100.0
Republican hold			

88th District (Allegan County)
Party	Candidate	Votes	%
Republican	Patricia L. Birkholz	24,291	67.16
Democratic	Terry Delp	11,862	32.79
Write-in		13	0.03
Total votes		36,166	100.0
Republican hold			

89th District (Ottawa County)
Party	Candidate	Votes	%
Republican	Jon Jellema (incumbent)	34,949	78.03
Democratic	Albert Dallas	9,756	21.78
Write-in		79	0.17
Total votes		44,784	100.0
Republican hold			

90th District (Ottawa County)
Party	Candidate	Votes	%
Republican	Jessie Dalman (incumbent)	34,053	78.08
Democratic	Rebecca Arenas	9,483	21.74
Write-in		75	0.17
Total votes		43,611	100.0
Republican hold			

91st District (Muskegon County)
Party	Candidate	Votes	%
Democratic	Paul Baade (incumbent)	23,173	70.62
Republican	Thomas Knol Jr.	9,638	29.37
Total votes		32,811	100.0
Democratic hold			

92nd District (Muskegon County)
Party	Candidate	Votes	%
Democratic	James Agee (incumbent)	19,689	74.39
Republican	Craig Bytwerk	6,776	25.60
Total votes		26,465	100.0
Democratic hold			

93rd District (Gratiot County, Montcalm County)
Party	Candidate	Votes	%
Republican	Larry DeVuyst	19,070	61.42
Democratic	Richard Ort	11,972	38.56
Write-in		4	0.01
Total votes		31,046	100.0
Republican hold			

94th District (Saginaw County)
Party	Candidate	Votes	%
Republican	Michael Goschka (incumbent)	23,556	66.55
Democratic	Michael Eischer	11,808	33.36
Write-in		30	0.08
Total votes		35,394	100.0
Republican hold			

95th District (Saginaw County)
Party	Candidate	Votes	%
Democratic	Michael J. Hanley (incumbent)	21,154	83.70
Republican	Robert Calhoun	4,038	15.97
Write-in		80	0.31
Total votes		25,272	100.0
Democratic hold			

96th District (Bay County, Saginaw County)
Party	Candidate	Votes	%
Democratic	A.T. Frank	22,135	55.67
Republican	Jerome Burns	17,546	44.13
Write-in		76	0.19
Total votes		39,757	100.0
Democratic gain from Republican			

97th District (Bay County)
Party	Candidate	Votes	%
Democratic	Howard Wetters (incumbent)	24,261	74.07
Republican	Andrew Woods	8,355	25.50
Write-in		137	0.41
Total votes		32,753	100.0
Democratic hold			

98th District (Gratiot County, Midland County)
Party	Candidate	Votes	%
Republican	James R. McNutt (incumbent)	25,427	71.62
Democratic	James Skeen	10,072	28.37
Write-in		1	0.00
Total votes		35,500	100.0
Republican hold			

99th District (Clare County, Isabella County)
Party	Candidate	Votes	%
Republican	Jim McBryde (incumbent)	18,739	63.66
Democratic	Randy Peterson	10,694	36.33
Write-in		1	0.00
Total votes		29,434	100.0
Republican hold			

100th District (Lake County, Mecosta County, Newaygo County)
Party	Candidate	Votes	%
Republican	John Llewellyn (incumbent)	21,207	64.59
Democratic	Glenn Perley	11,615	35.37
Write-in		11	0.03
Total votes		32,833	100.0
Republican hold			

101st District (Benzie County, Manistee County, Mason County, Oceana County)
Party	Candidate	Votes	%
Republican	Bill Bobier (incumbent)	21,787	59.51
Democratic	Lance Hendrickson	14,821	40.48
Write-in		2	0.00
Total votes		36,610	100.0
Republican hold			

102nd District (Missaukee County, Osceola County, Roscommon County, Wexford County)
Party	Candidate	Votes	%
Republican	John Gernaat (incumbent)	24,273	67.44
Democratic	Rodney Parker Sr.	11,709	32.53
Write-in		7	0.01
Total votes		35,989	100.0
Republican hold			

103rd District (Arenac County, Gladwin County, Iosco County, Ogemaw County)
Party	Candidate	Votes	%
Democratic	Thomas Alley (incumbent)	26,156	70.94
Republican	Don Birgel	10,713	29.05
Total votes		36,869	100.0
Democratic hold			

104th District (Grand Traverse County, Leelanau County)
Party	Candidate	Votes	%
Republican	Michelle McManus (incumbent)	26,443	62.33
Democratic	John Toth	15,930	37.55
Write-in		46	0.10
Total votes		42,419	100.0
Republican hold			

105th District (Alcona County, Antrim County, Crawford County, Kalkaska County, Montmorency County, Oscoda County, Otsego County)
Party	Candidate	Votes	%
Republican	Allen Lowe (incumbent)	27,290	69.06
Democratic	Arlin Briley	12,221	30.92
Write-in		2	0.00
Total votes		39,513	100.0
Republican hold			

106th District (Alpena County, Charlevoix County, Cheboygan County, Presque Isle County)
Party	Candidate	Votes	%
Republican	Beverly Bodem (incumbent)	24,335	62.15
Democratic	Bob Fournier	14,816	37.84
Write-in		1	0.00
Total votes		39,152	100.0
Republican hold			

107th District (Chippewa County, Emmet County, Luce County, Mackinac County, Schoolcraft County)
Party	Candidate	Votes	%
Democratic	Pat Gagliardi (incumbent)	25,254	68.80
Republican	George Kinsella	11,437	31.16
Write-in		11	0.02
Total votes		36,702	100.0
Democratic hold			

108th District (Delta County, Dickinson County, Menominee County)
Party	Candidate	Votes	%
Democratic	David Anthony (incumbent)	27,819	76.86
Republican	Lillian Carpio	7,921	21.88
Libertarian	Leslie Ellison	448	1.23
Write-in		5	0.01
Total votes		36,193	100.0
Democratic hold			

109th District (Alger County, Marquette County)
Party	Candidate	Votes	%
Democratic	Mike Prusi (incumbent)	21,359	70.94
Republican	Bob Struck	8,347	27.72
Libertarian	Jerry Pierre-Trettel	400	1.32
Total votes		30,106	100.0
Democratic hold			

110th District (Baraga County, Gogebic County, Houghton County, Iron County, Keweenaw County, Ontonagon County)
Party	Candidate	Votes	%
Democratic	Paul Tesanovich (incumbent)	21,265	59.23
Republican	Kathy Stupak-Thrall	13,886	38.68
Libertarian	Robert Black	744	2.07
Write-in		4	0.01
Total votes		35,899	100.0
Democratic hold			

=== Special elections ===
There were special elections in two state House districts on November 5, 1996, held alongside the general election.

A special election for the Michigan Senate was held on June 4. It was triggered by the resignation of Republican State Sen. David Honigman in March, due to ill health. The special election was won by Republican Bill Bullard Jr., who was an incumbent Republican member of the state House. He resigned from the state House to accept his position as state senator, leaving a vacancy in the 38th state House district. On June 10, Governor John Engler called for the special election to be held alongside the general election.

Initially, incumbent Democrat Robert DeMars was running for re-election in the 25th district. He died on October 21, two weeks before the general election. As per state law, the Democrats had to choose a new candidate to put on the ballot. Gloria Schermesser, mayor pro tem of Lincoln Park, was nominated by the Wayne Count Democratic Party to replace DeMars on the general election ballot. On October 24, Governor Engler called for the special election, coinciding with the general election.

The two winners, Republican Nancy Cassis replacing Bullard and Democrat Gloria Schermesser replacing DeMars, were sworn in on November 12.

The following are the results from the Michigan Secretary of State.

25th District special election (Wayne County)
Party	Candidate	Votes	%
Democratic	Gloria Schermesser	16,995	73.12
Republican	William Beddoes	5,208	22.40
Libertarian	Loel Gnadt	1,039	4.47
Total votes		23,242	100.0
Democratic hold			

38th District special election (Oakland County)
Party	Candidate	Votes	%
Republican	Nancy Cassis	23,522	67.31
Democratic	Gary Johnson	11,419	32.68
Total votes		34,941	100.0
Republican hold			
