= 2000 Michigan House of Representatives election =

- November 7, 2000

All 110 seats in the Michigan House of Representatives 56 seats needed for a majority
	Majority party	Minority party
Leader	Charles R. Perricone (Term limited)	Michael J. Hanley (Term limited)
Party	Republican	Democratic
Leader since	1999	1999
Leader's seat	61st district	95th district
Seats before	58	52
Seats after	58	52
Seat change	0	0
Popular vote	1,919,869	2,016,994
Percentage	48.18%	50.62%
Speaker before election
Charles R. Perricone
Republican
Elected Speaker
Rick Johnson
Republican

An election was held on November 7, 2000, to elect all 110 members of the Michigan House of Representatives for the 91st Michigan Legislature. In the election, the Republicans maintained their 58–52 majority.

== History ==
In the 1998 general election, Republicans won a majority in the Michigan House of Representatives. Previously, the Democrats had a 58-member majority, compared to the Republicans' 52-member minority. After the 1998 election, Republicans had 58-members in the state House, with Democrats having 52-members.

The 2000 state primary election was held on August 8. The general election was held on November 7.

In the 2000 general election, Republicans maintained their 58–52 majority in the state House. Rick Johnson was elected speaker of the House following the election. The Democrats selected Kwame Kilpatrick as House minority leader. Kilpatrick was the first African-American House minority leader in Michigan. On January 10, 2001, 109 state representatives were sworn into office. Incumbent legislator Janet Kukuk, who won election, died on November 19, before being sworn in. Of the 109, there were 21 legislators who were newcomers to the state House. This included Chris Kolb, the first openly gay state legislator in Michigan.

== Term limits ==
There were 21 incumbent state representatives unable to run for re-election in 2000 due to term limits. Of those term limited members, 14 were Democrats and 7 were Republican.

Name	Party	Dist.	Ref.
Edward Vaughn	Dem.	4th	
Martha G. Scott	Dem.	6th	
Thomas H. Kelly	Dem.	17th	
Eileen DeHart	Dem.	18th	
Gerald H. Law	Rep.	20th	
Sue Rocca	Rep.	30th	
Hubert Price Jr.	Dem.	43rd	
Deborah Cherry	Dem.	50th	
Elizabeth Brater	Dem.	53rd	
Ed LaForge	Dem.	60th	
Charles R. Perricone	Rep.	61st	
Lingg Brewer	Dem.	68th	
Lynne Martinez	Dem.	69th	
Laura Baird	Dem.	70th	
William R. Byl	Rep.	75th	
Mike Green	Rep.	84th	
Terry Geiger	Rep.	87th	
Jon Jellema	Rep.	89th	
Michael J. Hanley	Dem.	95th	
Mike Prusi	Dem.	109th	
Paul Tesanovich	Dem.	110th	

== Results ==
The following are the official election results from the Michigan Secretary of State.

=== Statewide ===
Party	Candi- dates	Votes		Seats		
Party	Candi- dates	No.	%	No.	+/–	%
Republican Party	109	1,919,869	48.18%	58	Steady	52.72%
Democratic Party	109	2,016,994	50.62%	52	Steady	47.27%
Libertarian Party	36	36,531	0.91%	0	Steady	0.00%
U.S. Taxpayers Party	4	4,233	0.10%	0	Steady	0.00%
Reform Party	4	3,607	0.09%	0	Steady	0.00%
Green Party	1	1,395	0.03%	0	Steady	0.00%
Independent	2	1,221	0.03%	0	Steady	0.00%
Write-ins	4	450	0.01%	0	Steady	0.00%
Natural Law Party	1	2	0.00%	0	Steady	0.00%
Total	271	3,984,302	100.00%	110	Steady	100.00%

=== By district ===
1st District (Wayne County)
Party	Candidate	Votes	%
Republican	Andrew Richner (incumbent)	25,228	61.61
Democratic	Patrick Irving Cwiek	14,811	36.17
Libertarian	Craig B. Hodges	906	2.21
Total votes		40,945	100.0
Republican hold			

2nd District (Wayne County)
Party	Candidate	Votes	%
Democratic	LaMar Lemmons III (incumbent)	19,265	92.23
Republican	Robert L. Ridley	1,121	5.37
Independent	William G. Tinsley	503	2.41
Total votes		20,889	100.0
Democratic hold			

3rd District (Wayne County)
Party	Candidate	Votes	%
Democratic	Artina Tinsley Hardman (incumbent)	19,780	94.75
Republican	Michael F. Embry	750	3.59
Libertarian	Joan M. Karpinski	345	1.65
Total votes		20,875	100.0
Democratic hold			

4th District (Wayne County)
Party	Candidate	Votes	%
Democratic	Mary D. Waters	18,831	96.29
Republican	Robert Bruner	726	3.71
Total votes		19,557	100.0
Democratic hold			

5th District (Wayne County)
Party	Candidate	Votes	%
Democratic	Ken Daniels (incumbent)	21,645	95.84
Republican	Marie Kaigler	940	4.16
Total votes		22,585	100.0
Democratic hold			

6th District (Wayne County)
Party	Candidate	Votes	%
Democratic	William McConico	18,055	93.09
Republican	Anthony J. Elam Sr.	1,337	6.89
Write-In	Bernadette Traylor	3	0.02
Total votes		19,395	100.0
Democratic hold			

7th District (Wayne County)
Party	Candidate	Votes	%
Democratic	Hansen Clarke (incumbent)	21,400	94.80
Republican	Curtis R. Jacobson	1,175	5.20
Total votes		22,575	100.0
Democratic hold			

8th District (Wayne County)
Party	Candidate	Votes	%
Democratic	Belda Garza (incumbent)	13,527	90.96
Republican	Judith C. Montville	1,345	9.04
Total votes		14,872	100.0
Democratic hold			

9th District (Wayne County)
Party	Candidate	Votes	%
Democratic	Kwame Kilpatrick (incumbent)	19,893	96.02
Republican	Lydia R. Polley	620	2.99
Libertarian	Kenneth E. Vojtech	205	0.99
Total votes		20,718	100.0
Democratic hold			

10th District (Wayne County)
Party	Candidate	Votes	%
Democratic	Buzz Thomas (incumbent)	30,319	97.48
Republican	Martin Royster	785	2.52
Total votes		31,104	100.0
Democratic hold			

11th District (Wayne County)
Party	Candidate	Votes	%
Democratic	Irma Clark-Coleman (incumbent)	23,296	93.86
Republican	Charles E. Powell Jr.	1,524	6.14
Total votes		24,820	100.0
Democratic hold			

12th District (Wayne County)
Party	Candidate	Votes	%
Democratic	Keith B. Stallworth (incumbent)	31,149	96.37
Republican	Karen L. Mastney	770	2.38
Libertarian	Michael L. Donahue	404	1.25
Total votes		32,323	100.0
Democratic hold			

13th District (Wayne County)
Party	Candidate	Votes	%
Democratic	Triette Reeves (incumbent)	21,395	92.32
Republican	Ernestine Nelson	1,779	7.68
Total votes		23,174	100.0
Democratic hold			

14th District (Wayne County)
Party	Candidate	Votes	%
Democratic	Derrick F. Hale (incumbent)	21,789	93.42
Republican	Nicole H. Aikens	1,534	6.58
Total votes		23,323	100.0
Democratic hold			

15th District (Wayne County)
Party	Candidate	Votes	%
Republican	Gary Woronchak (incumbent)	20,356	54.25
Democratic	Amanda Howe L.	16,067	42.82
Libertarian	Gregory Stempfle	1,097	2.92
Total votes		37,520	100.0
Republican hold			

16th District (Wayne County)
Party	Candidate	Votes	%
Democratic	Bob Brown (incumbent)	23,487	67.14
Republican	Colleen M. Wing	10,364	29.62
Libertarian	Chris Gonzalez	1,133	3.24
Total votes		34,984	100.0
Democratic hold			

17th District (Wayne County)
Party	Candidate	Votes	%
Democratic	Jim A. Plakas	20,885	76.61
Republican	Delvyn J. Rockwell	6,376	23.39
Total votes		27,261	100.0
Democratic hold			

18th District (Wayne County)
Party	Candidate	Votes	%
Democratic	Glenn S. Anderson	19,176	62.52
Republican	Patricia A. Gibbons	10,571	34.46
Libertarian	David A. Nagy	926	3.02
Total votes		30,673	100.0
Democratic hold			

19th District (Wayne County)
Party	Candidate	Votes	%
Republican	Laura M. Toy (incumbent)	23,546	60.84
Democratic	Michael Burke Sullivan	13,873	35.84
Libertarian	John A. Tartar	1,285	3.32
Total votes		38,704	100.0
Republican hold			

20th District (Wayne County)
Party	Candidate	Votes	%
Republican	John C. Stewart	30,427	64.48
Democratic	David G. Gray	16,759	35.52
Total votes		47,186	100.0
Republican hold			

21st District (Wayne County)
Party	Candidate	Votes	%
Republican	Bruce Patterson (incumbent)	24,714	59.10
Democratic	Mickey Walsh	17,104	40.90
Total votes		41,818	100.0
Republican hold			

22nd District (Wayne County)
Party	Candidate	Votes	%
Democratic	Raymond E. Basham (incumbent)	19,627	73.56
Republican	Robert J. Chmielewski	6,115	22.92
Libertarian	Kenneth Reyes	941	3.53
Total votes		26,683	100.0
Democratic hold			

23rd District (Wayne County)
Party	Candidate	Votes	%
Democratic	George Mans (incumbent)	21,914	51.13
Republican	Burl C. Adkins	19,631	45.80
Reform	Kenneth Johnson	726	1.69
Libertarian	Richard J. Secula	588	1.37
Total votes		42,859	100.0
Democratic hold			

24th District (Wayne County)
Party	Candidate	Votes	%
Democratic	William J. O'Neil (incumbent)	22,466	70.98
Republican	Joseph M. Lenard	8,594	27.15
Libertarian	Eric B. Gordon	593	1.87
Total votes		31,653	100.0
Democratic hold			

25th District (Wayne County)
Party	Candidate	Votes	%
Democratic	Gloria Schermesser (incumbent)	23,240	74.82
Republican	Jesse T. Church	6,759	21.76
Libertarian	John Morgan	1,063	3.42
Total votes		31,062	100.0
Democratic hold			

26th District (Macomb County)
Party	Candidate	Votes	%
Democratic	William J. Callahan (incumbent)	23,413	58.80
Republican	William J. Nearon	15,405	38.69
Libertarian	Keith P. Edwards	1,000	2.51
Total votes		39,818	100.0
Democratic hold			

27th District (Macomb County)
Party	Candidate	Votes	%
Democratic	Michael Switalski (incumbent)	24,532	73.27
Republican	Jim Riske	8,012	23.93
Libertarian	David R. Wejrandt	937	2.80
Total votes		33,481	100.0
Democratic hold			

28th District (Macomb County)
Party	Candidate	Votes	%
Democratic	Paul Wojno (incumbent)	20,522	73.13
Republican	Paul Welch	7,540	26.87
Total votes		28,062	100.0
Democratic hold			

29th District (Macomb County)
Party	Candidate	Votes	%
Republican	Jennifer Faunce (incumbent)	21,292	52.33
Democratic	Steve Bieda	18,967	46.61
Libertarian	E. Dean Sahutske	308	0.76
U.S. Taxpayers	Steven T. Revis	124	0.30
Total votes		40,691	100.0
Republican hold			

30th District (Macomb County)
Party	Candidate	Votes	%
Republican	Sal Rocca	23,625	61.07
Democratic	Irvin Droste	15,059	38.93
Total votes		38,684	100.0
Republican hold			

31st District (Macomb County)
Party	Candidate	Votes	%
Democratic	Paul Gieleghem (incumbent)	22,039	61.21
Republican	Diane Zontini	12,468	34.63
Libertarian	H. James Miller	1,498	4.16
Natural Law	Gordon Reh	2	0.01
Total votes		36,007	100.0
Democratic hold			

32nd District (Macomb County)
Party	Candidate	Votes	%
Republican	Alan Sanborn (incumbent)	32,162	66.59
Democratic	Greg Moore	14,852	30.75
Libertarian	Bob Van Oast	1,286	2.66
Total votes		48,300	100.0
Republican hold			

33rd District (Note: Janet Kukuk died on November 19, 2000, before she was sworn in. A special election to fill the vacancy in the 33rd state House district was held on May 20, 2001. Republican Leon Drolet was elected.) (Macomb County)
Party	Candidate	Votes	%
Republican	Janet Kukuk (incumbent)	32,622	57.94
Democratic	Bernadette DiSano	21,090	37.46
Libertarian	Joseph L. Zemens	1,334	2.37
U.S. Taxpayers	Tom Watson	1,259	2.24
Total votes		56,305	100.0
Republican hold			

34th District (Oakland County)
Party	Candidate	Votes	%
Democratic	Dave Woodward (incumbent)	19,452	65.14
Republican	Douglas K. Mac Lean Sr.	10,409	34.86
Total votes		29,861	100.0
Democratic hold			

35th District (Oakland County)
Party	Candidate	Votes	%
Democratic	Gilda Jacobs (incumbent)	26,756	74.56
Republican	Aaron G. Samson	8,050	22.43
Libertarian	Magalene C. Boleyn	1,077	3.00
Total votes		35,883	100.0
Democratic hold			

36th District (Oakland County)
Party	Candidate	Votes	%
Democratic	Nancy L. Quarles (incumbent)	31,796	85.20
Republican	Mel Palmer	5,524	14.80
Write-In	Edythe Marie Webber	0	0.00
Total votes		37,320	100.0
Democratic hold			

37th District (Oakland County)
Party	Candidate	Votes	%
Republican	Rocky Raczkowski (incumbent)	22,326	50.46
Democratic	Aldo Vagnozzi	21,362	48.28
Reform	Eric Borregard	554	1.25
Total votes		44,242	100.0
Republican hold			

38th District (Oakland County)
Party	Candidate	Votes	%
Republican	Nancy Cassis (incumbent)	29,047	64.03
Democratic	Linda Premo	14,196	31.29
Libertarian	Anne Bora	1,095	2.41
Reform	Joseph L. Bush Sr.	1,030	2.27
Total votes		45,368	100.0
Republican hold			

39th District (Oakland County)
Party	Candidate	Votes	%
Republican	Marc Shulman (incumbent)	28,697	57.89
Democratic	Ruth Fuller	19,679	39.70
Libertarian	Ray J. Kozora II	1,195	2.41
Total votes		49,571	100.0
Republican hold			

40th District (Oakland County)
Party	Candidate	Votes	%
Republican	Patricia Godchaux (incumbent)	34,674	72.55
Democratic	David I. Kaner	13,119	27.45
Total votes		47,793	100.0
Republican hold			

41st District (Oakland County)
Party	Candidate	Votes	%
Republican	John Pappageorge (incumbent)	23,702	60.48
Democratic	David T. Woodward	14,366	36.65
Libertarian	Jeffrey J. Hampton	1,125	2.87
Total votes		39,193	100.0
Republican hold			

42nd District (Oakland County)
Party	Candidate	Votes	%
Republican	Robert Gosselin (incumbent)	27,104	67.12
Democratic	Jerry L. Bixby	13,279	32.88
Total votes		40,383	100.0
Republican hold			

43rd District (Oakland County)
Party	Candidate	Votes	%
Democratic	Clarence Phillips	18,306	72.84
Republican	Pamela S. Neely	6,827	27.16
Total votes		25,133	100.0
Democratic hold			

44th District (Oakland County)
Party	Candidate	Votes	%
Republican	Mike Kowall (incumbent)	26,439	61.61
Democratic	Matthew E. Hogan III	16,477	38.39
Total votes		42,916	100.0
Republican hold			

45th District (Oakland County)
Party	Candidate	Votes	%
Republican	Mike Bishop (incumbent)	34,087	69.63
Democratic	Keith J. Van Wagner	14,868	30.37
Total votes		48,955	100.0
Republican hold			

46th District (Oakland County)
Party	Candidate	Votes	%
Republican	Ruth Johnson (incumbent)	29,119	64.48
Democratic	Patrick J. Doyon	13,928	30.84
U.S. Taxpayers	Sean Patrick Sullivan	2,110	4.67
Total votes		45,157	100.0
Republican hold			

47th District (Genesee County)
Party	Candidate	Votes	%
Democratic	Rose Bogardus (incumbent)	25,705	58.71
Republican	John M. Muller	16,734	38.22
U.S. Taxpayers	Jim Daniels	740	1.69
Libertarian	Trish Marie	605	1.38
Total votes		43,784	100.0
Democratic hold			

48th District (Genesee County)
Party	Candidate	Votes	%
Democratic	Vera B. Rison (incumbent)	24,813	90.63
Republican	Charles E. Williams	2,564	9.37
Total votes		27,377	100.0
Democratic hold			

49th District (Genesee County)
Party	Candidate	Votes	%
Democratic	Jack Minore (incumbent)	20,281	78.70
Republican	Nathanael Desota	5,489	21.30
Total votes		25,770	100.0
Democratic hold			

50th District (Genesee County)
Party	Candidate	Votes	%
Democratic	Paula Zelenko	24,628	62.12
Republican	George Cunningham	14,347	36.19
Libertarian	James C. Shollenberger	671	1.69
Total votes		39,646	100.0
Democratic hold			

51st District (Genesee County)
Party	Candidate	Votes	%
Democratic	Patricia A. Lockwood (incumbent)	28,114	64.12
Republican	Pam Barkel	15,731	35.88
Total votes		43,845	100.0
Democratic hold			

52nd District (Washtenaw County)
Party	Candidate	Votes	%
Democratic	John P. Hansen (incumbent)	30,067	65.22
Republican	Scott Wojack	16,036	34.78
Total votes		46,103	100.0
Democratic hold			

53rd District (Washtenaw County)
Party	Candidate	Votes	%
Democratic	Chris Kolb	27,682	70.55
Republican	Robert J. Bykowski	11,553	29.45
Total votes		39,235	100.0
Democratic hold			

54th District (Washtenaw County)
Party	Candidate	Votes	%
Democratic	Ruth Ann Jamnick (incumbent)	22,388	70.36
Republican	Tom Banks	9,431	29.64
Total votes		31,819	100.0
Democratic hold			

55th District (Lenawee County, Monroe County, Washtenaw County)
Party	Candidate	Votes	%
Republican	Gene DeRossett (incumbent)	25,910	60.57
Democratic	Kenneth Papenhagen	16,869	39.43
Total votes		42,779	100.0
Republican hold			

56th District (Monroe County)
Party	Candidate	Votes	%
Republican	Randy Richardville (incumbent)	17,604	50.42
Democratic	Herb Kehrl	16,593	47.52
Independent	Dean Patten	718	2.06
Total votes		34,915	100.0
Republican hold			

57th District (Lenawee County)
Party	Candidate	Votes	%
Democratic	Doug Spade (incumbent)	28,004	73.69
Republican	Fred Gallagher	9,999	26.31
Total votes		38,003	100.0
Democratic hold			

58th District (Branch County, Hillsdale County)
Party	Candidate	Votes	%
Republican	Steve Vear (incumbent)	20,450	66.05
Democratic	Roy Grigsby	10,510	33.95
Total votes		30,960	100.0
Republican hold			

59th District (Cass County, St. Joseph County)
Party	Candidate	Votes	%
Republican	Cameron S. Brown (incumbent)	22,877	69.24
Democratic	Burke H. Webb	10,161	30.76
Total votes		33,038	100.0
Republican hold			

60th District (Kalamazoo County)
Party	Candidate	Votes	%
Democratic	Alexander Lipsey	17,539	66.50
Republican	Gloria Krueger Ham	8,836	33.50
Total votes		26,375	100.0
Democratic hold			

61st District (Kalamazoo County)
Party	Candidate	Votes	%
Republican	Tom George	26,218	54.38
Democratic	Curtis J. Bell	21,366	44.32
Libertarian	S. Sterling Nunnemaker	627	1.30
Total votes		48,211	100.0
Republican hold			

62nd District (Calhoun County)
Party	Candidate	Votes	%
Democratic	Mark Schauer (incumbent)	22,549	67.10
Republican	George T. Perrett	11,057	32.90
Total votes		33,606	100.0
Democratic hold			

63rd District (Calhoun County, Kalamazoo County)
Party	Candidate	Votes	%
Republican	Jerry Vander Roest (incumbent)	21,936	55.47
Democratic	Tom Cook	16,627	42.04
Libertarian	Albert Mc Callum	985	2.49
Total votes		39,548	100.0
Republican hold			

64th District (Jackson County)
Party	Candidate	Votes	%
Republican	Clark Bisbee (incumbent)	16,238	60.48
Democratic	Lou Adams	10,609	39.52
Total votes		26,847	100.0
Republican hold			

65th District (Eaton County, Jackson County)
Party	Candidate	Votes	%
Republican	Mickey Mortimer (incumbent)	21,956	61.93
Democratic	Brenda Abbey	13,499	38.07
Total votes		35,455	100.0
Republican hold			

66th District (Livingston County)
Party	Candidate	Votes	%
Republican	Judith L. Scranton (incumbent)	36,815	72.17
Democratic	Jim Swonk	14,194	27.83
Total votes		51,009	100.0
Republican hold			

67th District (Ingham County, Livingston County)
Party	Candidate	Votes	%
Republican	Paul N. DeWeese (incumbent)	24,381	57.81
Democratic	Tom Holcomb	16,978	40.26
Libertarian	Yepram Dervahanian	816	1.93
Total votes		42,175	100.0
Republican hold			

68th District (Ingham County)
Party	Candidate	Votes	%
Democratic	Virgil Bernero	19,806	59.52
Republican	Stuart Goodrich	13,473	40.48
Total votes		33,279	100.0
Democratic hold			

69th District (Ingham County)
Party	Candidate	Votes	%
Democratic	Michael C. Murphy	17,450	68.41
Republican	Jeff Roth	8,057	31.59
Total votes		25,507	100.0
Democratic hold			

70th District (Ingham County)
Party	Candidate	Votes	%
Democratic	Gretchen Whitmer	17,409	56.59
Republican	Bill Hollister	13,355	43.41
Total votes		30,764	100.0
Democratic hold			

71st District (Eaton County)
Party	Candidate	Votes	%
Republican	Susan Tabor (incumbent)	25,999	61.22
Democratic	Faye Kraus	16,471	38.78
Total votes		42,470	100.0
Republican hold			

72nd District (Kent County)
Party	Candidate	Votes	%
Republican	Mark Jansen (incumbent)	35,946	73.58
Democratic	Christopher Vogt	12,905	26.42
Total votes		48,851	100.0
Republican hold			

73rd District (Kent County)
Party	Candidate	Votes	%
Republican	Doug Hart (incumbent)	37,194	71.47
Democratic	Dennis P. Brown	14,849	28.53
Total votes		52,043	100.0
Republican hold			

74th District (Kent County, Ottawa County)
Party	Candidate	Votes	%
Republican	James L. Koetje (incumbent)	30,371	68.49
Democratic	Alton R. Nielsen	12,576	28.36
Libertarian	Bill Gelineau	1,399	3.15
Total votes		44,346	100.0
Republican hold			

75th District (Kent County)
Party	Candidate	Votes	%
Republican	Jerry O. Kooiman	19,013	53.45
Democratic	Janice M. Hanley	16,557	46.55
Total votes		35,570	100.0
Republican hold			

76th District (Kent County)
Party	Candidate	Votes	%
Democratic	Steve Pestka (incumbent)	19,513	65.96
Republican	Patrick J. Miller	9,330	31.54
Libertarian	Paul Mastin	741	2.50
Total votes		29,584	100.0
Democratic hold			

77th District (Kent County)
Party	Candidate	Votes	%
Republican	Joanne Voorhees (incumbent)	18,751	59.93
Democratic	Levi Rickert	12,535	40.07
Total votes		31,286	100.0
Republican hold			

78th District (Berrien County)
Party	Candidate	Votes	%
Republican	Ron Jelinek (incumbent)	22,099	69.92
Democratic	Dennis L. Casto Jr.	9,505	30.08
Total votes		31,604	100.0
Republican hold			

79th District (Berrien County)
Party	Candidate	Votes	%
Republican	Charles LaSata (incumbent)	19,571	62.87
Democratic	Curtis L. Young	11,109	35.69
Write-In	Scott Elliot	434	1.39
Write-In	Lawrence Streeter	13	0.04
Total votes		31,127	100.0
Republican hold			

80th District (Cass County, Van Buren County)
Party	Candidate	Votes	%
Republican	Mary Ann Middaugh (incumbent)	21,473	62.62
Democratic	Art Toy	12,476	36.38
Libertarian	Timothy H. Miley	342	1.00
Total votes		34,291	100.0
Republican hold			

81st District (St. Clair County)
Party	Candidate	Votes	%
Republican	Lauren M. Hager (incumbent)	21,597	53.07
Democratic	David E. Oppliger	19,097	46.93
Total votes		40,694	100.0
Republican hold			

82nd District (Lapeer County, St. Clair County)
Party	Candidate	Votes	%
Republican	Judson Gilbert II (incumbent)	24,585	59.86
Democratic	Mike Delling	16,483	40.14
Total votes		41,068	100.0
Republican hold			

83rd District (Lapeer County, Sanilac County)
Party	Candidate	Votes	%
Republican	Stephen R. Ehardt (incumbent)	24,103	65.55
Democratic	Donna L. Grant	12,670	34.45
Total votes		36,773	100.0
Republican hold			

84th District (Huron County, Tuscola County)
Party	Candidate	Votes	%
Republican	Tom Meyer	24,447	64.05
Democratic	Pamela Stillwell-Binder	13,721	35.95
Total votes		38,168	100.0
Republican hold			

85th District (Clinton County, Shiawassee County)
Party	Candidate	Votes	%
Republican	Larry Julian (incumbent)	21,748	61.41
Democratic	James M. Billis	12,344	34.86
Libertarian	Trafton Jean	1,323	3.74
Total votes		35,415	100.0
Republican hold			

86th District (Clinton County, Ionia County)
Party	Candidate	Votes	%
Republican	Valde Garcia (incumbent)	24,525	63.69
Democratic	Teresa L. Patterson	12,988	33.73
Libertarian	David A. Brown	991	2.57
Total votes		38,504	100.0
Republican hold			

87th District (Barry County, Ionia County)
Party	Candidate	Votes	%
Republican	Gary Newell	23,463	67.14
Democratic	Henry A. Sanchez	11,482	32.86
Total votes		34,945	100.0
Republican hold			

88th District (Allegan County)
Party	Candidate	Votes	%
Republican	Patricia L. Birkholz (incumbent)	32,941	87.08
Libertarian	Rick Dutkiewicz	4,887	12.92
Total votes		37,828	100.0
Republican hold			

89th District (Ottawa County)
Party	Candidate	Votes	%
Republican	Barb Vander Veen	39,248	75.31
Democratic	James E. Helmick	12,868	24.69
Total votes		52,116	100.0
Republican hold			

90th District (Ottawa County)
Party	Candidate	Votes	%
Republican	Wayne Kuipers (incumbent)	38,841	76.66
Democratic	John C. O'Brien	9,791	19.32
Green	Jon Den Herder	1,395	2.75
Libertarian	Timothy Campbell	640	1.26
Total votes		50,667	100.0
Republican hold			

91st District (Muskegon County)
Party	Candidate	Votes	%
Republican	Gerald Van Woerkom (incumbent)	20,936	53.65
Democratic	Steve Habetler	18,085	46.35
Total votes		39,021	100.0
Republican hold			

92nd District (Muskegon County)
Party	Candidate	Votes	%
Democratic	Julie Dennis (incumbent)	18,960	69.77
Republican	Inez Heller Jones	8,214	30.23
Total votes		27,174	100.0
Democratic hold			

93rd District (Gratiot County, Montcalm County)
Party	Candidate	Votes	%
Republican	Larry DeVuyst (incumbent)	22,028	65.69
Democratic	Phil Woodruff	11,503	34.31
Total votes		33,531	100.0
Republican hold			

94th District (Saginaw County)
Party	Candidate	Votes	%
Republican	Jim Howell (incumbent)	23,078	58.19
Democratic	Cheryl Hadsall	16,581	41.81
Total votes		39,659	100.0
Republican hold			

95th District (Saginaw County)
Party	Candidate	Votes	%
Democratic	Carl M. Williams	21,225	100.0
Total votes		21,225	100.0
Democratic hold			

96th District (Bay County, Saginaw County)
Party	Candidate	Votes	%
Democratic	A.T. Frank (incumbent)	28,180	68.22
Republican	Derek E. Eager	12,450	30.14
Libertarian	Scott D. Carter	677	1.64
Total votes		41,307	100.0
Democratic hold			

97th District (Bay County)
Party	Candidate	Votes	%
Democratic	Joseph Rivet (incumbent)	22,299	65.88
Republican	Steven G. Goss	10,250	30.28
Reform	Edward L. Mueller	1,297	3.83
Total votes		33,846	100.0
Democratic hold			

98th District (Gratiot County, Midland County)
Party	Candidate	Votes	%
Republican	Tony Stamas (incumbent)	24,687	66.39
Democratic	Rick Shook	12,497	33.61%
Total votes		37,184	100.0
Republican hold			

99th District (Clare County, Isabella County)
Party	Candidate	Votes	%
Republican	Sandy Caul (incumbent)	16,657	51.46
Democratic	Susan Kay Smith	15,709	48.54
Total votes		32,366	100.0
Republican hold			

100th District (Lake County, Mecosta County, Newaygo County)
Party	Candidate	Votes	%
Republican	M. Pumford (incumbent)	22,484	63.08
Democratic	Cheryl L. Sterling	13,158	36.92
Total votes		35,642	100.0
Republican hold			

101st District (Benzie County, Manistee County, Mason County, Oceana County)
Party	Candidate	Votes	%
Republican	David Mead (incumbent)	23,005	57.49
Democratic	Nick Krieger	17,008	42.51
Total votes		40,013	100.0
Republican hold			

102nd District (Missaukee County, Osceola County, Roscommon County, Wexford County)
Party	Candidate	Votes	%
Republican	Rick Johnson (incumbent)	24,491	62.26
Democratic	Paul D. Williamson II	13,360	33.96
Libertarian	Greg Willis	1,486	3.78
Total votes		39,337	100.0
Republican hold			

103rd District (Arenac County, Gladwin County, Iosco County, Ogemaw County)
Party	Candidate	Votes	%
Democratic	Dale Sheltrown (incumbent)	26,549	67.66
Republican	Don Birgel	12,689	32.34
Total votes		39,238	100.0
Democratic hold			

104th District (Grand Traverse County, Leelanau County)
Party	Candidate	Votes	%
Republican	Jason Allen (incumbent)	34,839	71.94
Democratic	Ian J. Whitney	13,588	28.06
Total votes		48,427	100.0
Republican hold			

105th District (Alcona County, Antrim County, Crawford County, Kalkaska County, Montmorency County, Oscoda County, Otsego County)
Party	Candidate	Votes	%
Republican	Kenneth L. Bradstreet (incumbent)	30,784	67.16
Democratic	Tony Hefner	15,055	32.84
Total votes		45,839	100.0
Republican hold			

106th District (Alpena County, Charlevoix County, Cheboygan County, Presque Isle County)
Party	Candidate	Votes	%
Democratic	Andy Neumann (incumbent)	30,147	67.96
Republican	Francis B. Flanders	14,213	32.04
Total votes		44,360	100.0
Democratic hold			

107th District (Chippewa County, Emmet County, Luce County, Mackinac County, Schoolcraft County)
Party	Candidate	Votes	%
Republican	Scott Shackleton (incumbent)	28,552	70.58
Democratic	Steve Dart	11,902	29.42
Total votes		40,454	100.0
Republican hold			

108th District (Delta County, Dickinson County, Menominee County)
Party	Candidate	Votes	%
Democratic	Doug Bovin (incumbent)	28,954	74.91
Republican	Dennis Pape	9,700	25.09
Total votes		38,654	100.0
Democratic hold			

109th District (Alger County, Marquette County)
Party	Candidate	Votes	%
Democratic	Stephen Adamini	21,569	67.63
Republican	Gus Rydholm	10,325	32.37
Total votes		31,894	100.0
Democratic hold			

110th District (Baraga County, Gogebic County, Houghton County, Iron County, Keweenaw County, Ontonagon County)
Party	Candidate	Votes	%
Democratic	Rich Brown	19,073	51.48
Republican	Gregg Nominelli	17,977	48.52
Total votes		37,050	100.0
Democratic hold			
