= 1998 Michigan House of Representatives election =

- November 3, 1998

All 110 seats in the Michigan House of Representatives 56 seats needed for a majority
	Majority party	Minority party
Leader	Ken Sikkema (Term limited)	Curtis Hertel (Term limited)
Party	Republican	Democratic
Leader since	1995	1993
Leader's seat	74th district	2nd district
Seats before	52	58
Seats after	58	52
Seat change	▲6	▼6
Popular vote	1,473,780	1,455,416
Percentage	49.78%	49.16%
Speaker before election
Curtis Hertel
Democratic
Elected Speaker
Charles R. Perricone
Republican

An election was held on November 3, 1998, to elect all 110 members of the Michigan House of Representatives for the 90th Michigan Legislature. In the election, the Republicans won a 58–52 majority from what had previously been a 58–52 Democratic majority.

== History ==
In the 1996 general election, Democrats won a 58–52 majority in the Michigan House of Representatives against the Republicans.

Term limits for various state officers were added to the Michigan Constitution via ballot proposal in 1992. Members of the state House were limited to only serving six years for their life, starting after the adoption of the amendment. The term limits were upheld in a federal court case in February 1998. This meant that the 1998 election would be the first Michigan state House election in which legislators would be barred for re-election by term limits. There were 64 incumbents who were term limited.

The 1998 state primary election was held on August 4. The general election was held on November 3.

In the 1998 general election, Republicans won a 58–52 majority against the Democrats. After the election, Republican Charles R. Perricone was elected speaker of the state House. Michael J. Hanley was selected by the Democrats as House minority leader.

The state representatives were sworn in on January 13, 1999. Of the 110 members, 64 were newcomers to the state House.

== Results ==
The following are the official election results from the Michigan Secretary of State.

=== Statewide ===
Party	Candi- dates	Votes		Seats		
Party	Candi- dates	No.	%	No.	+/–	%
Republican Party	109	1,473,780	49.78%	58	▲6	52.72%
Democratic Party	110	1,455,416	49.16%	52	▼6	47.27%
Libertarian Party	36	27,789	0.93%	0	Steady	0.00%
Natural Law Party	2	1618	0.05%	0	Steady	0.00%
Reform Party	2	885	0.02%	0	Steady	0.00%
Independent	1	572	0.01%	0	Steady	0.00%
Write-ins	1	3	0.00%	0	Steady	0.00%
Total	261	2,960,063	100.00%	110	Steady	100.00%

=== By district ===
1st District (Wayne County)
Party	Candidate	Votes	%
Republican	Andrew Richner (incumbent)	21,948	68.55
Democratic	John Patrick Anderson	10,068	31.45
Total votes		32,016	100.0
Republican hold			

2nd District (Wayne County)
Party	Candidate	Votes	%
Democratic	LaMar Lemmons III	12,931	88.61
Republican	Mary Elie Williams	1,662	11.39
Total votes		14,593	100.0
Democratic hold			

3rd District (Wayne County)
Party	Candidate	Votes	%
Democratic	Artina Tinsley Hardman	15,073	92.25
Republican	Marlyss J. Landeros	868	5.31
Libertarian	Joann Marie Karpinski	399	2.44
Total votes		16,340	100.0
Democratic hold			

4th District (Wayne County)
Party	Candidate	Votes	%
Democratic	Edward Vaughn (incumbent)	15,239	95.84
Republican	Cynthia Billings	662	4.16
Total votes		15,901	100.0
Democratic hold			

5th District (Wayne County)
Party	Candidate	Votes	%
Democratic	Ken Daniels	15,623	93.02
Republican	Yolanda Haynes	1,170	6.97
Write-In	Nathan Vinson	3	0.02
Total votes		16,796	100.0
Democratic hold			

6th District (Wayne County)
Party	Candidate	Votes	%
Democratic	Martha G. Scott (incumbent)	14,269	91.32
Republican	Raymond F. Prus	1,356	8.68
Total votes		15,625	100.0
Democratic hold			

7th District (Wayne County)
Party	Candidate	Votes	%
Democratic	Hansen Clarke	17,010	94.02
Republican	Willie J. Cambell	1,081	5.98
Total votes		18,091	100.0
Democratic hold			

8th District (Wayne County)
Party	Candidate	Votes	%
Democratic	Belda Garza	9,606	85.13
Republican	Cheryl Fobbs-Lewis	1,678	14.87
Total votes		11,284	100.0
Democratic hold			

9th District (Wayne County)
Party	Candidate	Votes	%
Democratic	Kwame Kilpatrick (incumbent)	15,877	95.40
Republican	Kimberly Carpenter	766	4.60
Total votes		16,643	100.0
Democratic hold			

10th District (Wayne County)
Party	Candidate	Votes	%
Democratic	Buzz Thomas (incumbent)	24,374	96.43
Republican	Richard Henry	902	3.57
Total votes		25,276	100.0
Democratic hold			

11th District (Wayne County)
Party	Candidate	Votes	%
Democratic	Irma Clark-Coleman	18,049	93.07
Republican	Raquel Reardon	1,344	6.93
Total votes		19,393	100.0
Democratic hold			

12th District (Wayne County)
Party	Candidate	Votes	%
Democratic	Keith B. Stallworth (incumbent)	23,942	95.96
Republican	Tremell Anderson	1,007	4.04
Total votes		24,949	100.0
Democratic hold			

13th District (Wayne County)
Party	Candidate	Votes	%
Democratic	Triette Reeves	15,070	89.60
Republican	Leodis Brown	1,749	10.40
Total votes		16,819	100.0
Democratic hold			

14th District (Wayne County)
Party	Candidate	Votes	%
Democratic	Derrick F. Hale (incumbent)	15,716	100.0
Total votes		15,716	100.0
Democratic hold			

15th District (Wayne County)
Party	Candidate	Votes	%
Republican	Gary Woronchak	15,827	51.33
Democratic	Maureen Keane-Doran	13,817	44.81
Libertarian	Gregory Stempfle	1,188	3.85
Total votes		30,832	100.0
Republican gain from Democratic			

16th District (Wayne County)
Party	Candidate	Votes	%
Democratic	Bob Brown (incumbent)	17,059	59.14
Republican	Lyle C. Van Houten	11,084	38.42
Libertarian	Kerry Smith	704	2.44
Total votes		28,847	100.0
Democratic hold			

17th District (Wayne County)
Party	Candidate	Votes	%
Democratic	Thomas H. Kelly (incumbent)	14,277	72.63
Republican	Dan Smelser	4,983	25.35
Libertarian	Robert D. Irwin	396	2.01
Total votes		19,656	100.0
Democratic hold			

18th District (Wayne County)
Party	Candidate	Votes	%
Democratic	Eileen DeHart (incumbent)	12,516	62.29
Republican	Steve Conley	7,004	34.86
Libertarian	Michael R. Corliss	572	2.85
Total votes		20,092	100.0
Democratic hold			

19th District (Wayne County)
Party	Candidate	Votes	%
Republican	Laura M. Toy	17,898	61.26
Democratic	Patrick A. McRae	10,259	35.11
Libertarian	John J. Tatar	1,059	3.62
Total votes		29,216	100.0
Republican hold			

20th District (Wayne County)
Party	Candidate	Votes	%
Republican	Gerald H. Law (incumbent)	27,062	72.91
Democratic	Fred DiIacovo	8,860	23.87
Libertarian	Doug MacDonald	1,193	3.21
Total votes		37,115	100.0
Republican hold			

21st District (Wayne County)
Party	Candidate	Votes	%
Republican	Bruce Patterson	17,613	64.43
Democratic	Ray Bailey	9,723	35.57
Total votes		27,336	100.0
Republican hold			

22nd District (Wayne County)
Party	Candidate	Votes	%
Democratic	Raymond E. Basham (incumbent)	13,147	69.38
Republican	Susan Lee Chmielewski	5,123	27.04
Libertarian	James Victor Sager	678	3.58
Total votes		18,948	100.0
Democratic hold			

23rd District (Wayne County)
Party	Candidate	Votes	%
Democratic	George Mans (incumbent)	17,799	61.04
Republican	Elizabeth Kalabus	10,779	36.97
Libertarian	Gary R. Lloyd	582	2.00
Total votes		29,160	100.0
Democratic hold			

24th District (Wayne County)
Party	Candidate	Votes	%
Democratic	William J. O'Neil	16,119	67.02
Republican	Madeline D. Martin	7,454	30.99
Libertarian	Kathie Orvis	479	1.99
Total votes		24,052	100.0
Democratic hold			

25th District (Wayne County)
Party	Candidate	Votes	%
Democratic	Gloria Schermesser (incumbent)	16,376	69.39
Republican	David Stone	6,586	27.91
Libertarian	Nick Stoner	637	2.70
Total votes		23,599	100.0
Democratic hold			

26th District (Macomb County)
Party	Candidate	Votes	%
Democratic	William J. Callahan (incumbent)	18,572	59.72
Republican	Barbara C. Urban	11,655	37.48
Libertarian	Keith P. Edwards	872	2.80
Total votes		31,099	100.0
Democratic hold			

27th District (Macomb County)
Party	Candidate	Votes	%
Democratic	Michael Switalski	18,038	70.86
Republican	Philip F. Pitters	6,599	25.92
Libertarian	Thomas R. Sydlow	820	3.22
Total votes		25,457	100.0
Democratic hold			

28th District (Macomb County)
Party	Candidate	Votes	%
Democratic	Paul Wojno (incumbent)	15,858	70.88
Republican	Paul E. Welch	6,073	27.14
Libertarian	Ronald Burcham	442	1.98
Total votes		22,373	100.0
Democratic hold			

29th District (Macomb County)
Party	Candidate	Votes	%
Republican	Jennifer Faunce	16,858	51.47
Democratic	Charles T. Busse	15,370	46.92
Libertarian	E. Dean Sahutske	528	1.61
Total votes		32,756	100.0
Republican gain from Democratic			

30th District (Macomb County)
Party	Candidate	Votes	%
Republican	Sue Rocca (incumbent)	19,480	70.27
Democratic	Roger A. Fachini	7,287	26.29
Libertarian	Gerald J. McKeon	562	2.03
Reform	Robert Murphy	391	1.41
Total votes		27,720	100.0
Republican hold			

31st District (Macomb County)
Party	Candidate	Votes	%
Democratic	Paul Gieleghem	14,615	52.81
Republican	Quinnie E. Cody	12,147	43.89
Libertarian	John W. Fagan	914	3.30
Total votes		27,676	100.0
Democratic hold			

32nd District (Macomb County)
Party	Candidate	Votes	%
Republican	Alan Sanborn (incumbent)	24,700	73.82
Democratic	Aristidis Andreopoulos	7,593	22.69
Libertarian	Bob Van Oast	1,169	3.49
Total votes		33,462	100.0
Republican hold			

33rd District (Macomb County)
Party	Candidate	Votes	%
Republican	Janet Kukuk	20,526	57.30
Democratic	Charles Locklear	14,473	40.40
Libertarian	Joseph L. Zemens	824	2.30
Total votes		35,823	100.0
Republican hold			

34th District (Oakland County)
Party	Candidate	Votes	%
Democratic	Dave Woodward	12,110	54.97
Republican	Douglas K. Mac Lean Sr.	9,278	42.11
Libertarian	Terrence Ray Adams	643	2.92
Total votes		22,031	100.0
Democratic hold			

35th District (Oakland County)
Party	Candidate	Votes	%
Democratic	Gilda Jacobs	18,672	70.29
Republican	Cecilio Maldonado	6,483	24.40
Libertarian	Pam Collins	839	3.16
Independent	William G. Wizinsky	572	2.15
Total votes		26,566	100.0
Democratic hold			

36th District (Oakland County)
Party	Candidate	Votes	%
Democratic	Nancy L. Quarles (incumbent)	21,527	81.21
Republican	Elizabeth LaHood	4,981	18.79
Total votes		26,508	100.0
Democratic hold			

37th District (Oakland County)
Party	Candidate	Votes	%
Republican	Rocky Raczkowski (incumbent)	20,357	63.89
Democratic	Steve Dibert	11,505	36.11
Total votes		31,862	100.0
Republican hold			

38th District (Oakland County)
Party	Candidate	Votes	%
Republican	Nancy Cassis (incumbent)	22,207	71.59
Democratic	Kristy Mary Demas	8,811	28.41
Total votes		31,018	100.0
Republican hold			

39th District (Oakland County)
Party	Candidate	Votes	%
Republican	Marc Shulman	19,462	55.17
Democratic	Maxine Brickner	14,328	40.61
Natural Law	Susan J. Kaplan	1,489	4.22
Total votes		35,279	100.0
Republican hold			

40th District (Oakland County)
Party	Candidate	Votes	%
Republican	Patricia Godchaux (incumbent)	28,835	76.00
Democratic	Michael Coleman	9,106	24.00
Total votes		37,941	100.0
Republican hold			

41st District (Oakland County)
Party	Candidate	Votes	%
Republican	John Pappageorge	19,142	63.21
Democratic	David L. Richards	10,285	33.96
Libertarian	Lorna Tate	858	2.83
Total votes		30,285	100.0
Republican hold			

42nd District (Oakland County)
Party	Candidate	Votes	%
Republican	Robert Gosselin	20,285	67.62
Democratic	Jacquelyn A. Moore	9,712	32.38
Total votes		29,997	100.0
Republican hold			

43rd District (Oakland County)
Party	Candidate	Votes	%
Democratic	Hubert Price Jr. (incumbent)	12,785	73.59
Republican	Elsie E. Bigger	4,589	26.41
Total votes		17,374	100.0
Democratic hold			

44th District (Oakland County)
Party	Candidate	Votes	%
Republican	Mike Kowall	16,415	53.27
Democratic	Matt Hogan	14,397	46.73
Total votes		30,812	100.0
Republican hold			

45th District (Oakland County)
Party	Candidate	Votes	%
Republican	Mike Bishop	23,583	70.26
Democratic	Margaret M. Zande	9,982	29.74
Total votes		33,565	100.0
Republican hold			

46th District (Oakland County)
Party	Candidate	Votes	%
Republican	Ruth Johnson	21,739	67.54
Democratic	Roxanne La Montaine	8,571	26.63
Libertarian	Mark R. Carney	1,876	5.83
Total votes		32,186	100.0
Republican hold			

47th District (Genesee County)
Party	Candidate	Votes	%
Democratic	Rose Bogardus (incumbent)	17,560	53.50
Republican	Sandra J. Hill	15,263	46.50
Total votes		32,823	100.0
Democratic hold			

48th District (Genesee County)
Party	Candidate	Votes	%
Democratic	Vera B. Rison (incumbent)	18,878	90.69
Republican	Lorenzo Orr	1,938	9.31
Total votes		20,816	100.0
Democratic hold			

49th District (Genesee County)
Party	Candidate	Votes	%
Democratic	Jack Minore	15,114	75.30
Republican	Michael Bancroft	4,958	24.70
Total votes		20,072	100.0
Democratic hold			

50th District (Genesee County)
Party	Candidate	Votes	%
Democratic	Deborah Cherry (incumbent)	18,799	65.18
Republican	Jean-Ann H. Webster	10,042	34.82
Total votes		28,841	100.0
Democratic hold			

51st District (Genesee County)
Party	Candidate	Votes	%
Democratic	Patricia A. Lockwood	17,608	52.68
Republican	Tom Wright	15,819	47.32
Total votes		33,427	100.0
Democratic hold			

52nd District (Washtenaw County)
Party	Candidate	Votes	%
Democratic	John P. Hansen	18,567	54.51
Republican	Julie Knight	15,497	45.49
Total votes		34,064	100.0
Democratic hold			

53rd District (Washtenaw County)
Party	Candidate	Votes	%
Democratic	Elizabeth Brater (incumbent)	17,201	67.25
Republican	Garret Carlson	7,881	30.81
Reform	Paul Jensen	494	1.93
Total votes		25,576	100.0
Democratic hold			

54th District (Washtenaw County)
Party	Candidate	Votes	%
Democratic	Ruth Ann Jamnick	13,520	63.36
Republican	Tom M. Banks	7,274	34.09
Libertarian	Dan LaFavers	414	1.94
Natural Law	Fred George Sauer	129	0.60
Total votes		21,337	100.0
Democratic hold			

55th District (Lenawee County, Monroe County, Washtenaw County)
Party	Candidate	Votes	%
Republican	Gene DeRossett	17,628	61.30
Democratic	Donald R. Earhart	11,127	38.70
Total votes		28,755	100.0
Republican hold			

56th District (Monroe County)
Party	Candidate	Votes	%
Republican	Randy Richardville	12,827	51.55
Democratic	Larry T. Rutledge	12,054	48.45
Total votes		24,881	100.0
Republican gain from Democratic			

57th District (Lenawee County)
Party	Candidate	Votes	%
Democratic	Doug Spade	14,323	50.43
Republican	Richard Bailey	14,078	49.57
Total votes		28,401	100.0
Democratic gain from Republican			

58th District (Branch County, Hillsdale County)
Party	Candidate	Votes	%
Republican	Steve Vear	14,524	65.48
Democratic	Roy Grigsby	7,657	34.52
Total votes		22,181	100.0
Republican hold			

59th District (Cass County, St. Joseph County)
Party	Candidate	Votes	%
Republican	Cameron S. Brown	15,333	69.41
Democratic	Carl Holsinger	6,758	30.59
Total votes		22,091	100.0
Republican hold			

60th District (Kalamazoo County)
Party	Candidate	Votes	%
Democratic	Ed LaForge (incumbent)	12,558	63.54
Republican	Gloria Jean Ham	7,206	36.46
Total votes		19,764	100.0
Democratic hold			

61st District (Kalamazoo County)
Party	Candidate	Votes	%
Republican	Charles R. Perricone (incumbent)	22,585	66.35
Democratic	Bob Goodwin	11,456	33.65
Total votes		34,041	100.0
Republican hold			

62nd District (Calhoun County)
Party	Candidate	Votes	%
Democratic	Mark Schauer (incumbent)	15,428	63.78
Republican	Mark A. Behnke	8,761	36.22
Total votes		24,189	100.0
Democratic hold			

63rd District (Calhoun County, Kalamazoo County)
Party	Candidate	Votes	%
Republican	Jerry Vander Roest	15,942	56.07
Democratic	Tom Cook	12,492	43.93
Total votes		28,434	100.0
Republican hold			

64th District (Jackson County)
Party	Candidate	Votes	%
Republican	Clark Bisbee	11,645	53.81
Democratic	Martin J. Griffin	9,996	46.19
Total votes		21,641	100.0
Republican gain from Democratic			

65th District (Eaton County, Jackson County)
Party	Candidate	Votes	%
Republican	Mickey Mortimer	16,294	61.09
Democratic	Debbie A. Phelps	10,376	38.91
Total votes		26,670	100.0
Republican hold			

66th District (Livingston County)
Party	Candidate	Votes	%
Republican	Judith L. Scranton (incumbent)	24,054	70.30
Democratic	Patrick J. Blake	8,759	25.60
Libertarian	Teresa Ann Pollok	1,405	4.11
Total votes		34,218	100.0
Republican hold			

67th District (Ingham County, Livingston County)
Party	Candidate	Votes	%
Republican	Paul N. DeWeese	18,272	58.51
Democratic	William R. Keith	12,130	38.84
Libertarian	George Sise	825	2.64
Total votes		31,227	100.0
Republican hold			

68th District (Ingham County)
Party	Candidate	Votes	%
Democratic	Lingg Brewer (incumbent)	16,930	62.39
Republican	Gary Smith	10,207	37.61
Total votes		27,137	100.0
Democratic hold			

69th District (Ingham County)
Party	Candidate	Votes	%
Democratic	Lynne Martinez (incumbent)	14,284	68.23
Republican	Tom Rasmusson	6,650	31.77
Total votes		20,934	100.0
Democratic hold			

70th District (Ingham County)
Party	Candidate	Votes	%
Democratic	Laura Baird (incumbent)	14,346	56.66
Republican	Virginia L. White	10,065	39.75
Libertarian	Michael F. Brinkman	909	3.59
Total votes		25,320	100.0
Democratic hold			

71st District (Eaton County)
Party	Candidate	Votes	%
Republican	Susan Tabor	20,250	61.16
Democratic	Phillip A. Brown	12,861	38.84
Total votes		33,111	100.0
Republican hold			

72nd District (Kent County)
Party	Candidate	Votes	%
Republican	Mark Jansen (incumbent)	27,018	77.27
Democratic	Judy D. Crandall	7,946	22.73
Total votes		34,964	100.0
Republican hold			

73rd District (Kent County)
Party	Candidate	Votes	%
Republican	Doug Hart	28,119	74.82
Democratic	Dennis P. Brown	9,463	25.18
Total votes		37,582	100.0
Republican hold			

74th District (Kent County, Ottawa County)
Party	Candidate	Votes	%
Republican	James L. Koetje	22,530	71.61
Democratic	Bonnie Reffitt	8,932	28.39
Total votes		31,462	100.0
Republican hold			

75th District (Kent County)
Party	Candidate	Votes	%
Republican	William R. Byl (incumbent)	17,091	63.30
Democratic	Janice M. Hanley	9,910	36.70
Total votes		27,001	100.0
Republican hold			

76th District (Kent County)
Party	Candidate	Votes	%
Democratic	Steve Pestka	12,009	54.47
Republican	James E. Kozak	10,036	45.53
Total votes		22,045	100.0
Democratic hold			

77th District (Kent County)
Party	Candidate	Votes	%
Republican	Joanne Voorhees	13,205	60.00
Democratic	Karl Holzhueter	8,386	38.10
Libertarian	Glenn A. Barr	419	1.90
Total votes		22,010	100.0
Republican hold			

78th District (Berrien County)
Party	Candidate	Votes	%
Republican	Ron Jelinek (incumbent)	14,661	72.53
Democratic	Dennis Casto	5,143	25.44
Libertarian	Jay L. Sauvé	411	2.03
Total votes		20,215	100.0
Republican hold			

79th District (Berrien County)
Party	Candidate	Votes	%
Republican	Charles LaSata	14,031	67.56
Democratic	Tony Wiatrowski	6,099	29.37
Libertarian	Scott Beavers	638	3.07
Total votes		20,768	100.0
Republican hold			

80th District (Cass County, Van Buren County)
Party	Candidate	Votes	%
Republican	Mary Ann Middaugh	15,541	63.59
Democratic	Art Toy	8,637	35.34
Libertarian	William Bradley	261	1.07
Total votes		24,439	100.0
Republican hold			

81st District (St. Clair County)
Party	Candidate	Votes	%
Republican	Lauren M. Hager	14,918	48.94
Democratic	Howard T. Heidemann	14,650	48.06
Libertarian	Peter Porcaro	915	3.00
Total votes		30,483	100.0
Republican hold			

82nd District (Lapeer County, St. Clair County)
Party	Candidate	Votes	%
Republican	Judson Gilbert II	17,189	56.38
Democratic	Pamela J. Wall	13,300	43.62
Total votes		30,489	100.0
Republican gain from Republican			

83rd District (Lapeer County, Sanilac County)
Party	Candidate	Votes	%
Republican	Stephen R. Ehardt	15,309	55.19
Democratic	John Espinoza	12,429	44.81
Total votes		27,738	100.0
Republican hold			

84th District (Huron County, Tuscola County)
Party	Candidate	Votes	%
Republican	Mike Green (incumbent)	20,893	71.36
Democratic	Ed Markham	8,384	28.64
Total votes		29,277	100.0
Republican hold			

85th District (Clinton County, Shiawassee County)
Party	Candidate	Votes	%
Republican	Larry Julian	13,721	48.70
Democratic	Jeffrey Fitzgerald	13,365	47.44
Libertarian	Max Dollarhite	1,089	3.87
Total votes		28,175	100.0
Republican gain from Democratic			

86th District (Clinton County, Ionia County)
Party	Candidate	Votes	%
Republican	Valde Garcia	19,106	66.05
Democratic	Jack M. Brown	9,257	32.00
Libertarian	Will White	565	1.95
Total votes		28,928	100.0
Republican hold			

87th District (Barry County, Ionia County)
Party	Candidate	Votes	%
Republican	Terry Geiger (incumbent)	18,362	72.69
Democratic	Henry A. Sanchez	6,899	27.31
Total votes		25,261	100.0
Republican hold			

88th District (Allegan County)
Party	Candidate	Votes	%
Republican	Patricia L. Birkholz (incumbent)	22,848	75.34
Democratic	Terry Delp	7,478	24.66
Total votes		30,326	100.0
Republican hold			

89th District (Ottawa County)
Party	Candidate	Votes	%
Republican	Jon Jellema (incumbent)	31,730	83.14
Democratic	Albert Dallas	6,436	16.86
Total votes		38,166	100.0
Republican hold			

90th District (Ottawa County)
Party	Candidate	Votes	%
Republican	Wayne Kuipers	31,092	84.44
Democratic	Clemente Amaya	5,731	15.56
Total votes		36,823	100.0
Republican hold			

91st District (Muskegon County)
Party	Candidate	Votes	%
Republican	Gerald Van Woerkom	15,156	53.09
Democratic	Stephen Habetler	13,394	46.91
Total votes		28,550	100.0
Republican gain from Democratic			

92nd District (Muskegon County)
Party	Candidate	Votes	%
Democratic	Julie Dennis	12,295	60.90
Republican	Inez Heller Jones	7,893	39.10
Total votes		20,188	100.0
Democratic hold			

93rd District (Gratiot County, Montcalm County)
Party	Candidate	Votes	%
Republican	Larry DeVuyst (incumbent)	17,094	68.90
Democratic	Paul Eby	7,715	31.10
Total votes		24,809	100.0
Republican hold			

94th District (Saginaw County)
Party	Candidate	Votes	%
Republican	Jim Howell	15,179	50.12
Democratic	Walter J. Wendling	15,106	49.88
Total votes		30,285	100.0
Republican hold			

95th District (Saginaw County)
Party	Candidate	Votes	%
Democratic	Michael J. Hanley (incumbent)	16,054	85.81
Republican	Robert Zelle	2,655	14.19
Total votes		18,709	100.0
Democratic hold			

96th District (Bay County, Saginaw County)
Party	Candidate	Votes	%
Democratic	A.T. Frank (incumbent)	21,505	65.67
Republican	Roland J. Jersevic	11,240	34.33
Total votes		32,745	100.0
Democratic hold			

97th District (Bay County)
Party	Candidate	Votes	%
Democratic	Joseph Rivet	16,622	63.79
Republican	Steven G. Goss	8,786	33.72
Libertarian	Allen A. Bauer	651	2.50
Total votes		26,059	100.0
Democratic hold			

98th District (Gratiot County, Midland County)
Party	Candidate	Votes	%
Republican	Tony Stamas	19,501	70.07
Democratic	Andrew Iwamasa	8,328	29.93
Total votes		27,829	100.0
Republican hold			

99th District (Clare County, Isabella County)
Party	Candidate	Votes	%
Republican	Sandy Caul	12,238	52.21
Democratic	Susan Kay Smith	11,201	47.79
Total votes		23,439	100.0
Republican hold			

100th District (Lake County, Mecosta County, Newaygo County)
Party	Candidate	Votes	%
Republican	M. Pumford	17,124	62.96
Democratic	Glenn Perley	10,075	37.04
Total votes		27,199	100.0
Republican hold			

101st District (Benzie County, Manistee County, Mason County, Oceana County)
Party	Candidate	Votes	%
Republican	David Mead	18,026	57.93
Democratic	Lance Hendrickson	13,093	42.07
Total votes		31,119	100.0
Republican hold			

102nd District (Missaukee County, Osceola County, Roscommon County, Wexford County)
Party	Candidate	Votes	%
Republican	Rick Johnson	18,737	61.24
Democratic	Terry Diane Suchowesky	11,861	38.76
Total votes		30,598	100.0
Republican hold			

103rd District (Arenac County, Gladwin County, Iosco County, Ogemaw County)
Party	Candidate	Votes	%
Democratic	Dale Sheltrown	16,983	54.51
Republican	Don Birgel	14,173	45.49
Total votes		31,156	100.0
Democratic hold			

104th District (Grand Traverse County, Leelanau County)
Party	Candidate	Votes	%
Republican	Jason Allen	23,750	62.71
Democratic	Jane Haynes	14,124	37.29
Total votes		37,874	100.0
Republican hold			

105th District (Alcona County, Antrim County, Crawford County, Kalkaska County, Montmorency County, Oscoda County, Otsego County)
Party	Candidate	Votes	%
Republican	Ken Bradstreet	22,887	65.55
Democratic	Elaine R. Felts	12,029	34.45
Total votes		34,916	100.0
Republican hold			

106th District (Alpena County, Charlevoix County, Cheboygan County, Presque Isle County)
Party	Candidate	Votes	%
Democratic	Andy Neumann	18,279	52.20
Republican	Phil Ludlow	16,735	47.80
Total votes		35,014	100.0
Democratic gain from Republican			

107th District (Chippewa County, Emmet County, Luce County, Mackinac County, Schoolcraft County)
Party	Candidate	Votes	%
Republican	Scott Shackleton	15,888	50.86
Democratic	Randy Bertram	15,350	49.14
Total votes		31,238	100.0
Republican gain from Democratic			

108th District (Delta County, Dickinson County, Menominee County)
Party	Candidate	Votes	%
Democratic	Doug Bovin	18,870	65.01
Republican	Matt G. Minor	10,157	34.99
Total votes		29,027	100.0
Democratic hold			

109th District (Alger County, Marquette County)
Party	Candidate	Votes	%
Democratic	Mike Prusi (incumbent)	19,928	79.76
Republican	Jason DesParois	5,056	20.24
Total votes		24,984	100.0
Democratic hold			

110th District (Baraga County, Gogebic County, Houghton County, Iron County, Keweenaw County, Ontonagon County)
Party	Candidate	Votes	%
Democratic	Paul Tesanovich (incumbent)	20,998	74.51
Republican	Luke Gunderman	6,132	21.76
Libertarian	Robert Black	1,053	3.74
Total votes		28,183	100.0
Democratic hold			

== See also ==
- 1998 Michigan Senate election
