= 1994 Michigan House of Representatives election =

- November 8, 1994

All 110 seats in the Michigan House of Representatives 56 seats needed for a majority
	Majority party	Minority party
Leader	Paul Hillegonds	Curtis Hertel
Party	Republican	Democratic
Leader since	1987	1993
Leader's seat	88th district	2nd district
Last election	55	55
Seats after	56	54
Seat change	▲1	▼1
Popular vote	1,524,382	1,417,636
Percentage	51.44%	47.84%
Speaker before election
Curtis Hertel
Democratic
Paul Hillegonds
Republican
Elected Speaker
Paul Hillegonds
Republican

An election was held on November 8, 1994, to elect all 110 members of the Michigan House of Representatives for the 88th Michigan Legislature. The election resulted in a slim 56–54 Republican majority in the chamber.

== History ==
In the 1992 general election, the state House was left an even 55–55 split of Democrats and Republicans. After the election, Republican Paul Hillegonds and Democrat Curtis Hertel were elected co-speakers of the state House.

The 1994 state primary election was held on August 2. Only 37 out of 93 incumbents seeking re-election had primary opponents. Of the 37, 21 were Democrats and 16 were Republicans. Incumbent Republican Jerry Vorva was defeated by Gerald Law. Incumbent Democrat David S. Points was defeated by Martha G. Scott. Incumbent Democrat Carolyn Cheeks Kilpatrick had her name on the state House primary ballot, but was running a write-in campaign for the state Senate seat formerly held by Democratic state senator David S. Holmes Jr., who had died a few days after the filing deadline for the election. Kilpatrick would win the state House primary, and lose her state Senate write-in campaign.

The general election was held on November 8. The Republicans gained one seat in the election, winning the party a 56–54 majority in the chamber. The one flipped seat was in the 16th district, left open by the retiring Democrat Dick Young. It was won by Republican James Ryan. In the 47th district, the race was close enough to trigger a recount. The recount affirmed the victory of incumbent Republican Sandra Hill. After the election, Hillegonds was elected speaker of the House. Hertel was elected by the Democrats as minority leader.

Democrat Dominic Jacobetti, the longest serving state legislator in Michigan's history, was re-elected in the 1994 general election, but died on November 28, before being sworn into his next term. The state House was sworn in on January 11, 1995.

== Results ==
The following are the results from the Michigan Secretary of State.

=== Statewide ===
Party	Candi- dates	Votes		Seats		
Party	Candi- dates	No.	%	No.	+/–	%
Republican Party	109	1,524,382	51.44%	56	▲1	50.90%
Democratic Party	110	1,417,636	47.84%	54	▼1	49.09%
Libertarian Party	19	13,597	0.45%	0	Steady	0.00%
Write-ins		4,104	0.13%	0	Steady	0.00%
Independents	4	2,335	0.07%	0	Steady	0.00%
Workers World Party	4	954	0.03%	0	Steady	0.00%
Total	246	2,963,008	100.00%	110	Steady	100.00%

=== By district ===
1st District (Wayne County)
Party	Candidate	Votes	%
Republican	William R. Bryant Jr. (incumbent)	23,604	71.80
Democratic	Kerry Baitinger	9,267	28.19
Write-in		2	0.00
Total votes		32,873	100.0
Republican hold			

2nd District (Wayne County)
Party	Candidate	Votes	%
Democratic	Curtis Hertel (incumbent)	15,203	87.93
Republican	Robert Ridley	2,083	12.04
Write-in		2	0.01
Total votes		17,288	100.0
Democratic hold			

3rd District (Wayne County)
Party	Candidate	Votes	%
Democratic	Mary Lou Parks (incumbent)	17,916	91.12
Republican	Donald Campbell	1,061	5.39
Independent	William Tinsley	386	1.96
Libertarian	Joann Karpinski	185	0.94
Independent	Jasper Young	113	0.57
Total votes		19,661	100.0
Democratic hold			

4th District (Wayne County)
Party	Candidate	Votes	%
Democratic	Edward Vaughn	18,078	95.23
Republican	Dovie Pickett	721	3.79
Workers World	Durk Barton	184	0.96
Total votes		18,983	100.0
Democratic hold			

5th District (Wayne County)
Party	Candidate	Votes	%
Democratic	Ted Wallace (incumbent)	17,258	91.07
Republican	Gladys Smith	1,691	8.92
Total votes		18,949	100.0
Democratic hold			

6th District (Wayne County)
Party	Candidate	Votes	%
Democratic	Martha G. Scott	15,715	88.88
Republican	Raymond Prus	1,959	11.08
Write-in		6	0.03
Total votes		17,680	100.0
Democratic hold			

7th District (Wayne County)
Party	Candidate	Votes	%
Democratic	Raymond M. Murphy (incumbent)	19,099	93.36
Republican	John Scarberry	814	3.97
Workers World	Joyce Erickson	311	1.52
Libertarian	Scott Boman	233	1.13
Total votes		20,457	100.0
Democratic hold			

8th District (Wayne County)
Party	Candidate	Votes	%
Democratic	Ilona Varga (incumbent)	11,837	88.26
Republican	Sandra Wallace	1,571	11.71
Write-in		2	0.01
Total votes		13,410	100.0
Democratic hold			

9th District (Wayne County)
Party	Candidate	Votes	%
Democratic	Carolyn Cheeks Kilpatrick (incumbent)	18,987	94.97
Republican	Christopher Flournoy	794	3.97
Workers World	Gertrude Cook	211	1.05
Total votes		19,992	100.0
Democratic hold			

10th District (Wayne County)
Party	Candidate	Votes	%
Democratic	Nelson Saunders (incumbent)	26,366	95.82
Republican	Alice Graves	1,149	4.17
Write-in		1	0.00
Total votes		27,516	100.0
Democratic hold			

11th District (Wayne County)
Party	Candidate	Votes	%
Democratic	Morris Hood Jr. (incumbent)	20,266	91.33
Republican	Conley Worsham	1,922	8.66
Total votes		22,188	100.0
Democratic hold			

12th District (Wayne County)
Party	Candidate	Votes	%
Democratic	Alma G. Stallworth (incumbent)	25,299	95.13
Republican	Bill Ashe	1,293	4.86
Total votes		26,592	100.0
Democratic hold			

13th District (Wayne County)
Party	Candidate	Votes	%
Democratic	Burton Leland (incumbent)	17,138	91.39
Republican	Tony Spearman-Leach	1,614	8.60
Total votes		18,752	100.0
Democratic hold			

14th District (Wayne County)
Party	Candidate	Votes	%
Democratic	Michael J. Bennane (incumbent)	15,596	89.31
Republican	Joyce James	1,865	10.68
Total votes		17,461	100.0
Democratic hold			

15th District (Wayne County)
Party	Candidate	Votes	%
Democratic	Agnes Dobronski (incumbent)	17,807	52.79
Republican	Douglas Thomas	14,657	43.45
Libertarian	Ted Tifrea	1,263	3.74
Write-in		2	0.00
Total votes		33,729	100.0
Democratic hold			

16th District (Wayne County)
Party	Candidate	Votes	%
Republican	James Ryan	16,797	53.34
Democratic	Kevin Kelley	14,688	46.64
Write-in		5	0.01
Total votes		31,490	100.0
Republican gain from Democratic			

17th District (Wayne County)
Party	Candidate	Votes	%
Democratic	Thomas Kelly	14,264	65.66
Republican	Edward Juarez	6,821	31.39
Libertarian	Alex Stevenson	449	2.06
Independent	William Lowry	188	0.86
Write-in		1	0.00
Total votes		21,723	100.0
Democratic hold			

18th District (Wayne County)
Party	Candidate	Votes	%
Democratic	Eileen DeHart	11,492	51.81
Republican	Michael Novak	10,682	48.16
Write-in		4	0.01
Total votes		22,178	100.0
Democratic hold			

19th District (Wayne County)
Party	Candidate	Votes	%
Republican	Lyn Bankes (incumbent)	18,617	58.33
Democratic	Elaine Miller	12,172	38.14
Libertarian	John Tatar	1,123	3.51
Write-in		2	0.00
Total votes		31,914	100.0
Republican hold			

20th District (Wayne County)
Party	Candidate	Votes	%
Republican	Gerald H. Law	25,320	67.11
Democratic	Carolyn Blanchard	12,402	32.87
Write-in		4	0.01
Total votes		37,726	100.0
Republican hold			

21st District (Wayne County)
Party	Candidate	Votes	%
Republican	Deborah Whyman (incumbent)	15,909	61.35
Democratic	Donna Clark	10,016	38.62
Write-in		5	0.01
Total votes		25,930	100.0
Republican hold			

22nd District (Wayne County)
Party	Candidate	Votes	%
Democratic	Gregory Pitoniak (incumbent)	12,371	63.60
Republican	Joseph Slaven	7,078	36.39
Total votes		19,449	100.0
Democratic hold			

23rd District (Wayne County)
Party	Candidate	Votes	%
Democratic	Vincent Porreca (incumbent)	17,772	60.38
Republican	Walter Barron	11,656	39.60
Write-in		1	0.00
Total votes		29,429	100.0
Democratic hold			

24th District (Wayne County)
Party	Candidate	Votes	%
Democratic	Joseph Palamara (incumbent)	18,270	69.93
Republican	Raymond Krutsch	7,855	30.06
Total votes		26,125	100.0
Democratic hold			

25th District (Wayne County)
Party	Candidate	Votes	%
Democratic	Robert DeMars (incumbent)	16,178	64.84
Republican	Gary Fisher	8,772	35.15
Total votes		24,950	100.0
Democratic hold			

26th District (Macomb County)
Party	Candidate	Votes	%
Democratic	Tracey Yokich (incumbent)	17,100	52.26
Republican	Tom Ulrich	14,743	45.05
Libertarian	Keith Edwards	626	1.91
Workers World	Beverley Bloedel	248	0.75
Write-in		3	0.00
Total votes		32,720	100.0
Democratic hold			

27th District (Macomb County)
Party	Candidate	Votes	%
Democratic	Nick Ciaramitaro (incumbent)	17,658	66.27
Republican	Hugh Hodges	7,946	29.82
Libertarian	Mathew Ignash	1,033	3.87
Write-in		6	0.02
Total votes		26,643	100.0
Democratic hold			

28th District (Macomb County)
Party	Candidate	Votes	%
Democratic	Lloyd F. Weeks (incumbent)	14,961	64.69
Republican	Dan Nixon	8,164	35.30
Write-in		1	0.00
Total votes		23,126	100.0
Democratic hold			

29th District (Macomb County)
Party	Candidate	Votes	%
Democratic	Dennis Olshove (incumbent)	19,721	56.78
Republican	Michael Wiecek	14,565	41.93
Libertarian	Paul Soyk	443	1.27
Write-in		1	0.00
Total votes		34,730	100.0
Democratic hold			

30th District (Macomb County)
Party	Candidate	Votes	%
Republican	Sue Rocca	16,947	59.56
Democratic	Cynthia Wowk	11,504	40.43
Total votes		28,451	100.0
Republican hold			

31st District (Macomb County)
Party	Candidate	Votes	%
Democratic	Sharon Gire (incumbent)	14,951	53.83
Republican	James Tignanelli	12,050	43.38
Libertarian	John Fagan	771	2.77
Total votes		27,772	100.0
Democratic hold			

32nd District (Macomb County)
Party	Candidate	Votes	%
Republican	David Jaye (incumbent)	17,613	55.55
Democratic	Dick Kennedy	12,848	40.52
Libertarian	Bob Van Oast	1,239	3.90
Write-in		5	0.01
Total votes		31,705	100.0
Republican hold			

33rd District (Macomb County)
Party	Candidate	Votes	%
Republican	Alvin H. Kukuk (incumbent)	17,379	57.37
Democratic	Gina Bertolini	11,831	39.05
Libertarian	Jim Boyle	1,080	3.56
Write-in		2	0.00
Total votes		30,292	100.0
Republican hold			

34th District (Oakland County)
Party	Candidate	Votes	%
Democratic	John Freeman (incumbent)	14,756	62.35
Republican	Kathryn Kling	8,098	34.22
Libertarian	Mary Wayfield	797	3.36
Write-in		12	0.05
Total votes		23,663	100.0
Democratic hold			

35th District (Oakland County)
Party	Candidate	Votes	%
Democratic	David Gubow (incumbent)	19,461	70.12
Republican	John Fillicaro	8,253	29.73
Write-in		39	0.14
Total votes		27,753	100.0
Democratic hold			

36th District (Oakland County)
Party	Candidate	Votes	%
Democratic	Maxine Berman (incumbent)	22,244	78.60
Republican	Calvin Williams Jr.	6,053	21.39
Total votes		28,297	100.0
Democratic hold			

37th District (Oakland County)
Party	Candidate	Votes	%
Republican	Jan C. Dolan (incumbent)	22,878	69.10
Democratic	Richard Dailey	9,250	27.94
Libertarian	Yepram DerVahanian	952	2.87
Write-in		24	0.07
Total votes		33,104	100.0
Republican hold			

38th District (Oakland County)
Party	Candidate	Votes	%
Republican	Bill Bullard Jr. (incumbent)	20,782	73.17
Democratic	Bob Havey	7,573	26.66
Write-in		47	0.16
Total votes		28,402	100.0
Republican hold			

39th District (Oakland County)
Party	Candidate	Votes	%
Republican	Barbara Dobb (incumbent)	22,737	65.02
Democratic	Daniel Cherrin	12,152	34.75
Write-in		77	0.22
Total votes		34,966	100.0
Republican hold			

40th District (Oakland County)
Party	Candidate	Votes	%
Republican	John Jamian (incumbent)	28,585	70.83
Democratic	Joe Patt	11,692	28.97
Write-in		80	0.19
Total votes		40,357	100.0
Republican hold			

41st District (Oakland County)
Party	Candidate	Votes	%
Republican	Shirley Johnson (incumbent)	22,226	73.54
Democratic	Ed Hamilton	7,921	26.21
Write-in		73	0.24
Total votes		30,220	100.0
Republican hold			

42nd District (Oakland County)
Party	Candidate	Votes	%
Republican	Greg Kaza (incumbent)	21,280	73.32
Democratic	Jon Buller	7,740	26.67
Total votes		29,020	100.0
Republican hold			

43rd District (Oakland County)
Party	Candidate	Votes	%
Democratic	Hubert Price Jr. (incumbent)	12,011	67.56
Republican	John Demers	5,724	32.19
Write-in		43	0.24
Total votes		17,778	100.0
Democratic hold			

44th District (Oakland County)
Party	Candidate	Votes	%
Republican	David Galloway (incumbent)	20,133	66.80
Democratic	George Montgomery	9,931	32.95
Write-in		71	0.23
Total votes		30,135	100.0
Republican hold			

45th District (Oakland County)
Party	Candidate	Votes	%
Republican	Penny Crissman (incumbent)	24,047	76.99
Democratic	Paul Sweda	6,381	20.43
Libertarian	Kay Suri	794	2.54
Write-in		11	0.03
Total votes		31,233	100.0
Republican hold			

46th District (Oakland County)
Party	Candidate	Votes	%
Republican	Tom F. Middleton (incumbent)	21,749	72.05
Democratic	Steve Allen	8,385	27.77
Write-in		51	0.16
Total votes		30,185	100.0
Republican hold			

47th District (Genesee County)
Party	Candidate	Votes	%
Republican	Sandra Hill (Note: The official results on the Michigan Secretary of State website showed Sandra Hill having won 16,207 votes and Rose Bogardus having won 16,137 votes. A recount in December showed Hill having won 16,203 and Bogardus having won 16,145 votes.) (incumbent)	16,207	50.10
Democratic	Rose Bogardus	16,137	49.89
Total votes		32,344	100.0
Republican hold			

48th District (Genesee County)
Party	Candidate	Votes	%
Democratic	Floyd Clack (incumbent)	20,765	88.08
Republican	John Callahan	2,810	11.91
Total votes		23,575	100.0
Democratic hold			

49th District (Genesee County)
Party	Candidate	Votes	%
Democratic	Robert L. Emerson (incumbent)	17,908	76.52
Republican	Lawrence Romanowski	5,492	23.47
Total votes		23,400	100.0
Democratic hold			

50th District (Genesee County)
Party	Candidate	Votes	%
Democratic	Deborah Cherry	16,082	52.87
Republican	Bruce Rider	14,331	47.12
Total votes		30,413	100.0
Democratic hold			

51st District (Genesee County)
Party	Candidate	Votes	%
Democratic	Candace A. Curtis (incumbent)	17,546	52.35
Republican	David B. Robertson	15,967	47.64
Write-in		1	0.00
Total votes		33,514	100.0
Democratic hold			

52nd District (Washtenaw County)
Party	Candidate	Votes	%
Democratic	Mary Schroer (incumbent)	17,523	54.39
Republican	Martin Straub	14,067	43.67
Libertarian	James Hudler	620	1.92
Write-in		2	0.00
Total votes		32,212	100.0
Democratic hold			

53rd District (Washtenaw County)
Party	Candidate	Votes	%
Democratic	Elizabeth Brater	13,944	56.68
Republican	Renee Birnbaum	10,627	43.20
Write-in		26	0.10
Total votes		24,597	100.0
Democratic hold			

54th District (Washtenaw County)
Party	Candidate	Votes	%
Democratic	Kirk Profit (incumbent)	14,781	99.94
Write-in		8	0.05
Total votes		14,789	100.0
Democratic hold			

55th District (Lenawee County, Monroe County, Washtenaw County)
Party	Candidate	Votes	%
Republican	Beverly Hammerstrom (incumbent)	18,013	69.05
Democratic	Herbert Moyer	8,071	30.94
Total votes		26,084	100.0
Republican hold			

56th District (Monroe County)
Party	Candidate	Votes	%
Democratic	Lynn Owen (incumbent)	12,208	52.43
Republican	Dan Maletich	11,071	47.55
Write-in		2	0.00
Total votes		23,281	100.0
Democratic hold			

57th District (Lenawee County)
Party	Candidate	Votes	%
Republican	Tim Walberg (incumbent)	16,938	64.70
Democratic	Cindy Helinski	9,238	35.29
Total votes		26,176	100.0
Republican hold			

58th District (Branch County, Hillsdale County)
Party	Candidate	Votes	%
Republican	Michael Nye (incumbent)	18,381	79.45
Democratic	Iva Heim	4,752	20.54
Total votes		23,133	100.0
Republican hold			

59th District (Cass County, St. Joseph County)
Party	Candidate	Votes	%
Republican	Glenn Oxender (incumbent)	16,881	76.06
Democratic	Burke Webb	5,304	23.89
Write-in		9	0.04
Total votes		22,194	100.0
Republican hold			

60th District (Kalamazoo County)
Party	Candidate	Votes	%
Democratic	Ed LaForge	11,149	53.94
Republican	Jackie Morrison	9,520	46.05
Total votes		20,669	100.0
Democratic hold			

61st District (Kalamazoo County)
Party	Candidate	Votes	%
Republican	Charles R. Perricone	20,141	60.94
Democratic	Betsy Rice	12,909	39.05
Total votes		33,050	100.0
Republican hold			

62nd District (Calhoun County)
Party	Candidate	Votes	%
Republican	Eric Bush	14,397	56.37
Democratic	Ron Amy	11,113	43.51
Write-in		29	0.11
Total votes		25,539	100.0
Republican hold			

63rd District (Calhoun County, Kalamazoo County)
Party	Candidate	Votes	%
Republican	Donald Gilmer (incumbent)	18,750	66.74
Democratic	Jerry Johnson	9,332	33.21
Write-in		11	0.03
Total votes		28,093	100.0
Republican hold			

64th District (Jackson County)
Party	Candidate	Votes	%
Democratic	Michael Griffin (incumbent)	12,192	55.26
Republican	Kathy Schmaltz	9,555	43.31
Libertarian	Tom Slaughter	312	1.41
Total votes		22,059	100.0
Democratic hold			

65th District (Eaton County, Jackson County)
Party	Candidate	Votes	%
Republican	Clyde LaTarte (incumbent)	16,220	64.07
Democratic	John Riggs	9,090	35.90
Write-in		4	0.01
Total votes		25,314	100.0
Republican hold			

66th District (Livingston County)
Party	Candidate	Votes	%
Republican	Susan Munsell (incumbent)	23,755	73.83
Democratic	Donald Coveny	8,371	26.01
Write-in		46	0.14
Total votes		32,172	100.0
Republican hold			

67th District (Ingham County, Livingston County)
Party	Candidate	Votes	%
Republican	Dan Gustafson (incumbent)	21,235	71.46
Democratic	Winifred Motherwell	8,479	28.53
Total votes		29,714	100.0
Republican hold			

68th District (Ingham County)
Party	Candidate	Votes	%
Democratic	Lingg Brewer	15,114	55.00
Republican	Linda Ploeg	12,364	44.99
Write-in		1	0.00
Total votes		27,479	100.0
Democratic hold			

69th District (Ingham County)
Party	Candidate	Votes	%
Democratic	Lynne Martinez (incumbent)	14,740	65.63
Republican	Jeff Brenner	7,716	34.36
Total votes		22,456	100.0
Democratic hold			

70th District (Ingham County)
Party	Candidate	Votes	%
Democratic	Laura Baird	14,018	56.72
Republican	David Rizor	10,688	43.25
Write-in		5	0.02
Total votes		24,711	100.0
Democratic hold			

71st District (Eaton County)
Party	Candidate	Votes	%
Republican	Frank M. Fitzgerald (incumbent)	21,543	63.99
Democratic	Art Luna	12,104	35.95
Write-in		14	0.04
Total votes		33,661	100.0
Republican hold			

72nd District (Kent County)
Party	Candidate	Votes	%
Republican	Walter DeLange (incumbent)	25,311	77.56
Democratic	Al Rice	7,315	22.41
Write-in		5	0.01
Total votes		32,631	100.0
Republican hold			

73rd District (Kent County)
Party	Candidate	Votes	%
Republican	Jack Horton (incumbent)	25,302	73.07
Democratic	Cliff Worden	9,317	26.90
Write-in		7	0.02
Total votes		34,626	100.0
Republican hold			

74th District (Kent County, Ottawa County)
Party	Candidate	Votes	%
Republican	Ken Sikkema (incumbent)	22,913	78.09
Democratic	John Sobotta	6,422	21.88
Write-in		6	0.02
Total votes		29,341	100.0
Republican hold			

75th District (Kent County)
Party	Candidate	Votes	%
Republican	William Byl	17,473	65.24
Democratic	Linda Steimel	8,735	32.61
Libertarian	Jim Lundy	574	2.14
Total votes		26,782	100.0
Republican hold			

76th District (Kent County)
Party	Candidate	Votes	%
Democratic	Thomas Mathieau (incumbent)	14,112	62.66
Republican	Steve Johnson	7,670	34.05
Libertarian	Dan Marsh	739	3.28
Total votes		22,521	100.0
Democratic hold			

77th District (Kent County)
Party	Candidate	Votes	%
Republican	Harold Voorhees (incumbent)	10,214	69.25
Democratic	Donald Nyman	4,533	30.73
Write-in		1	0.00
Total votes		14,748	100.0
Republican hold			

78th District (Berrien County)
Party	Candidate	Votes	%
Republican	Carl Gnodtke (incumbent)	13,338	62.37
Democratic	Marti Wegner	8,033	37.56
Write-in		12	0.05
Total votes		21,383	100.0
Republican hold			

79th District (Berrien County)
Party	Candidate	Votes	%
Republican	Bob Brackenridge (incumbent)	14,482	67.27
Democratic	Helen McKenzie	6,674	31.00
Libertarian	Scott Beavers	364	1.69
Write-in		5	0.02
Total votes		21,525	100.0
Republican hold			

80th District (Cass County, Van Buren County)
Party	Candidate	Votes	%
Republican	James Middaugh (incumbent)	17,109	70.65
Democratic	MaDonna Martin	7,107	29.34
Total votes		24,216	100.0
Republican hold			

81st District (St. Clair County)
Party	Candidate	Votes	%
Republican	Terry London (incumbent)	18,576	62.60
Democratic	Howard Heidemann	11,074	37.31
Write-in		24	0.08
Total votes		29,674	100.0
Republican hold			

82nd District (Lapeer County, St. Clair County)
Party	Candidate	Votes	%
Democratic	Karen Willard (incumbent)	14,864	50.60
Republican	Judson Gilbert II	14,505	49.37
Write-in		6	0.02
Total votes		29,375	100.0
Democratic hold			

83rd District (Lapeer County, Sanilac County)
Party	Candidate	Votes	%
Republican	Kim Rhead (incumbent)	19,166	70.74
Democratic	Bob Dillon	7,923	29.24
Write-in		3	0.01
Total votes		27,092	100.0
Republican hold			

84th District (Huron County, Tuscola County)
Party	Candidate	Votes	%
Republican	Mike Green	17,260	59.69
Democratic	Russell Davis	11,654	40.30
Total votes		28,914	100.0
Republican hold			

85th District (Clinton County, Shiawassee County)
Party	Candidate	Votes	%
Democratic	Clark Harder (incumbent)	13,995	51.42
Republican	Mike Dvorak	13,200	48.50
Write-in		21	0.07
Total votes		27,216	100.0
Democratic hold			

86th District (Clinton County, Ionia County)
Party	Candidate	Votes	%
Republican	Alan Cropsey (incumbent)	18,552	63.88
Democratic	Martin Lankford	10,483	36.09
Write-in		6	0.02
Total votes		29,041	100.0
Republican hold			

87th District (Barry County, Ionia County)
Party	Candidate	Votes	%
Republican	Terry Geiger	15,848	66.70
Democratic	Bob Edwards	7,909	33.29
Total votes		23,757	100.0
Republican hold			

88th District (Allegan County)
Party	Candidate	Votes	%
Republican	Paul Hillegonds (incumbent)	21,472	75.37
Democratic	W. T. Delp	5,365	18.83
Independent	Thomas Houseman	1,648	5.78
Write-in		2	0.00
Total votes		28,487	100.0
Republican hold			

89th District (Ottawa County)
Party	Candidate	Votes	%
Republican	Jon Jellema	28,321	81.82
Democratic	Albert Dallas	6,223	17.97
Write-in		69	0.19
Total votes		34,613	100.0
Republican hold			

90th District (Ottawa County)
Party	Candidate	Votes	%
Republican	Jessie Dalman (incumbent)	26,916	83.88
Democratic	Cynthia Sloan	5,087	15.85
Write-in		82	0.25
Total votes		32,085	100.0
Republican hold			

91st District (Muskegon County)
Party	Candidate	Votes	%
Democratic	Paul Baade (incumbent)	16,053	60.83
Republican	Richard Bray	10,331	39.15
Write-in		2	0.00
Total votes		26,386	100.0
Democratic hold			

92nd District (Muskegon County)
Party	Candidate	Votes	%
Democratic	James Agee (incumbent)	13,437	66.02
Republican	Eric Strattan	6,905	33.93
Write-in		8	0.03
Total votes		20,350	100.0
Democratic hold			

93rd District (Gratiot County, Montcalm County)
Party	Candidate	Votes	%
Republican	Gary L. Randall (incumbent)	17,349	70.75
Democratic	John Willard	7,170	29.24
Total votes		24,519	100.0
Republican hold			

94th District (Saginaw County)
Party	Candidate	Votes	%
Republican	Michael Goschka (incumbent)	19,423	65.96
Democratic	Jerrold Humpula	9,980	33.89
Write-in		41	0.13
Total votes		29,444	100.0
Republican hold			

95th District (Saginaw County)
Party	Candidate	Votes	%
Democratic	Michael J. Hanley	14,328	67.23
Republican	Richard Haines	4,034	18.93
Write-in		2,947	13.82
Total votes		21,309	100.0
Democratic hold			

96th District (Bay County, Saginaw County)
Party	Candidate	Votes	%
Republican	Roland Jersevic (incumbent)	17,584	52.96
Democratic	Sue Kaltenbach	15,574	46.91
Write-in		39	0.11
Total votes		33,197	100.0
Republican hold			

97th District (Bay County)
Party	Candidate	Votes	%
Democratic	Howard Wetters (incumbent)	17,891	69.33
Republican	Carl Smith Jr.	7,912	30.66
Total votes		25,803	100.0
Democratic hold			

98th District (Gratiot County, Midland County)
Party	Candidate	Votes	%
Republican	James R. McNutt (incumbent)	19,061	67.77
Democratic	Karen Sherwood	9,063	32.22
Total votes		28,124	100.0
Republican hold			

99th District (Clare County, Isabella County)
Party	Candidate	Votes	%
Republican	Jim McBryde (incumbent)	14,513	60.29
Democratic	Kathleen Ling	9,557	39.70
Total votes		24,070	100.0
Republican hold			

100th District (Lake County, Mecosta County, Newaygo County)
Party	Candidate	Votes	%
Republican	John Llewellyn (incumbent)	17,964	70.36
Democratic	Thomas Rundquist	7,561	29.61
Write-in		3	0.01
Total votes		25,528	100.0
Republican hold			

101st District (Benzie County, Manistee County, Mason County, Oceana County)
Party	Candidate	Votes	%
Republican	Bill Bobier (incumbent)	21,907	74.00
Democratic	Ronald Wandrych	7,690	25.97
Write-in		4	0.01
Total votes		29,601	100.0
Republican hold			

102nd District (Missaukee County, Osceola County, Roscommon County, Wexford County)
Party	Candidate	Votes	%
Republican	John Gernaat (incumbent)	21,509	73.36
Democratic	Rodney Parker Sr.	7,786	26.55
Write-in		22	0.07
Total votes		29,317	100.0
Republican hold			

103rd District (Arenac County, Gladwin County, Iosco County, Ogemaw County)
Party	Candidate	Votes	%
Democratic	Thomas Alley (incumbent)	19,898	65.92
Republican	Mary Good	10,282	34.06
Write-in		2	0.00
Total votes		30,182	100.0
Democratic hold			

104th District (Grand Traverse County, Leelanau County)
Party	Candidate	Votes	%
Republican	Michelle McManus (incumbent)	21,181	60.17
Democratic	Geraldine Greene	13,990	39.74
Write-in		27	0.07
Total votes		35,198	100.0
Republican hold			

105th District (Alcona County, Antrim County, Crawford County, Kalkaska County, Montmorency County, Oscoda County, Otsego County)
Party	Candidate	Votes	%
Republican	Allen Lowe (incumbent)	22,952	68.05
Democratic	Kathy Tripp	10,772	31.94
Total votes		33,724	100.0
Republican hold			

106th District (Alpena County, Charlevoix County, Cheboygan County, Presque Isle County)
Party	Candidate	Votes	%
Republican	Beverly A. Bodem (incumbent)	19,409	58.24
Democratic	G. T. Long	13,913	41.75
Write-in		1	0.00
Total votes		33,323	100.0
Republican hold			

107th District (Chippewa County, Emmet County, Luce County, Mackinac County, Schoolcraft County)
Party	Candidate	Votes	%
Democratic	Pat Gagliardi (incumbent)	17,933	57.94
Republican	Shannon Brower	13,012	42.04
Write-in		5	0.01
Total votes		30,950	100.0
Democratic hold			

108th District (Delta County, Dickinson County, Menominee County)
Party	Candidate	Votes	%
Democratic	David Anthony (incumbent)	16,377	51.89
Republican	Laurie Bink	15,178	48.10
Total votes		31,555	100.0
Democratic hold			

109th District (Alger County, Marquette County)
Party	Candidate	Votes	%
Democratic	Dominic Jacobetti (Note: Dominic Jacobetti died before being sworn in. A special election was held on May 16, 1995, to fill the vacancy left by Jacobetti's death. The special election was won by Democrat Mike Prusi.) (incumbent)	17,081	69.67
Republican	Terry Talo	7,434	30.32
Total votes		24,515	100.0
Democratic hold			

110th District (Baraga County, Gogebic County, Houghton County, Iron County, Keweenaw County, Ontonagon County)
Party	Candidate	Votes	%
Democratic	Paul Tesanovich (incumbent)	16,359	54.06
Republican	Stephen Dresch	13,888	45.89
Write-in		13	0.04
Total votes		30,260	100.0
Democratic hold			

== See also ==
- 1994 Michigan Senate election
