= 1994 Michigan Senate election =

- November 8, 1994

All 38 seats in the Michigan Senate 20 seats needed for a majority
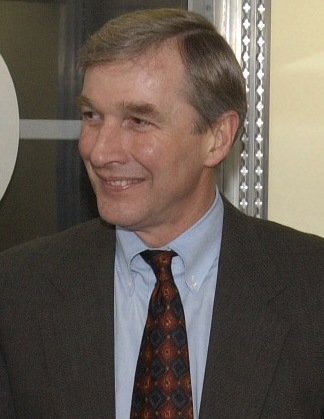

	Majority party	Minority party
Leader	Dick Posthumus	Art Miller Jr.
Party	Republican	Democratic
Leader since	1991	1985
Leader's seat	31st district	27th district
Last election	20	18
Seats before	22	15
Seats after	22	16
Seat change	0	▲1
Popular vote	1,579,185	1,363,334
Percentage	53.30%	46.01%
Majority Leader before election
Dick Posthumus
Republican
Elected Majority Leader
Dick Posthumus
Republican

An election was held on November 8, 1994, to elect all 38 members of the Michigan Senate for the 88th Michigan Legislature. In the election, the Republicans maintained their 22–16 majority over the Democrats.

== History ==
In the 1990 general election, the Republicans won a 20–18 majority over the Democrats, the same result of the 1986 election. In November 1992, conservative Democrat Gilbert DiNello defected to the Republican Party. In a March 1993 special election, Republican Joel Gougeon won a special election for a seat previously held by Democrat James Barcia, who resigned to serve in the U.S. House of Representatives. In May 1994, Democratic State Sen. David S. Holmes Jr. died. In June, Governor John Engler declared the special election to fill the vacancy his death left in the Senate would be held on November 8, alongside the general election. These changes left the state Senate with a 22–15 Republican majority over the Democrats before the 1994 general election.

This was the first election after redistricting occurred, based on the 1990 census.

Initially, Democratic State Rep. Carolyn Cheeks Kilpatrick filed to run for the state Senate in the 3rd district's Democratic primary, but withdrew upon learning that David S. Holmes was also running for re-election in the same district. Holmes died days after the filing deadline. The Michigan Legislature passed a bill, reopening the deadline, allowing Kilpatrick and other prospective candidates to refile for the primary. Henry Stallings II, who had been Holmes's only challenger in the primary before he died, challenged the bill, claiming it was unconstitutional. The law was voided by a circuit court ruling in June. Kilpatrick would run an unsuccessful write-in campaign against Stallings in the primary.

The primary election was held on August 2. Incumbents saw re-election, including DiNello. The Associated Press reported that DiNello was expected to face a serious primary challenge due to his party swap, though he would win his primary by a large margin. The Democrats viewed his state Senate seat as vulnerable in the general election.

The general election was held on November 8. Republican incumbent DiNello lost re-election, but the Republicans managed to win another seat. Republican Loren Bennett won the seat left open by the retiring of Democrat William Faust. The elected maintained their 22–16 majority over the Democrats. Following the election, Republican Dick Posthumus was re-elected majority leader. Art Miller Jr. was re-elected by the Democrats as minority leader.

The state Senate was sworn in on January 11, 1995.

== Results ==
The following are the official results from the Michigan Secretary of State.

=== Statewide ===
Party	Candi- dates	Votes		Seats		
Party	Candi- dates	No.	%	No.	+/–	%
Republican Party	38	1,579,185	53.30%	22	Steady	57.89%
Democratic Party	38	1,363,334	46.01%	16	▲1	42.10%
Libertarian Party	6	15,223	0.51%	0	Steady	0.00%
Natural Law Party	3	3,115	0.10%	0	Steady	0.00%
Independents	1	944	0.03%	0	Steady	0.00%
Write-ins		835	0.02%	0	Steady	0.00%
Total	86	2,962,636	100.00%	38	Steady	100.00%

=== By district ===
1st District
Party	Candidate	Votes	%
Democratic	Joe Young Jr.	39,208	58.96
Republican	Peter Ecklund Jr.	27,288	41.03
Write-in		2	0.00
Total votes		66,498	100.0

2nd District
Party	Candidate	Votes	%
Democratic	Virgil C. Smith (incumbent)	47,174	88.57
Republican	Carolyn Smith	6,081	11.41
Write-in		1	0.00
Total votes		53,256	100.0

3rd District
Party	Candidate	Votes	%
Democratic	Henry Stallings II	45,788	90.45
Republican	Carole Cromwell	3,887	7.67
Independent	Stephen McCoy	944	1.86
Total votes		50,619	100.0

4th District
Party	Candidate	Votes	%
Democratic	Jackie Vaughn III (incumbent)	62,715	95.62
Republican	Eunice Myles	2,865	4.36
Write-in		1	0.00
Total votes		65,581	100.0

5th District
Party	Candidate	Votes	%
Democratic	Michael O'Brien (incumbent)	51,291	90.86
Republican	Tondria Canty	5,155	9.13
Total votes		56,446	100.0

6th District
Party	Candidate	Votes	%
Democratic	George Z. Hart (incumbent)	43,947	52.61
Republican	Nancy Hubbard	39,570	47.37
Write-in		2	0.00
Total votes		83,519	100.0

7th District
Party	Candidate	Votes	%
Democratic	Christopher D. Dingell (incumbent)	41,049	61.48
Republican	Bob Keller	25,708	38.50
Write-in		1	0.00
Total votes		66,758	100.0

8th District
Party	Candidate	Votes	%
Republican	Loren Bennett	32,744	51.35
Democratic	Charles Griffin	31,011	48.63
Write-in		6	0.00
Total votes		63,761	100.0

9th District
Party	Candidate	Votes	%
Republican	R. Robert Geake (incumbent)	59,463	66.18
Democratic	Patrick O'Neil	30,376	33.80
Write-in		6	0.00
Total votes		89,845	100.0

10th District
Party	Candidate	Votes	%
Democratic	Art Miller Jr. (incumbent)	42,919	59.46
Republican	Mary Giordano	29,249	40.52
Write-in		11	0.01
Total votes		72,179	100.0

11th District
Party	Candidate	Votes	%
Democratic	Kenneth DeBeaussaert	42,562	53.28
Republican	Gilbert DiNello (incumbent)	37,313	46.71
Write-in		2	0.00
Total votes		79,877	100.0

12th District
Party	Candidate	Votes	%
Republican	Doug Carl (incumbent)	56,492	70.36
Democratic	Morton Kripke	23,777	29.61
Write-in		13	0.01
Total votes		80,282	100.0

13th District
Party	Candidate	Votes	%
Republican	Mike Bouchard (incumbent)	59,846	65.84
Democratic	Robert Boyd	28,871	31.76
Libertarian	Henry Freriks	2,141	2.35
Write-in		29	0.03
Total votes		90,887	100.0

14th District
Party	Candidate	Votes	%
Democratic	Gary Peters	48,351	56.54
Republican	Michael Warren	33,767	39.49
Libertarian	Richard Gach	1,884	2.20
Natural Law	Stuart Goldberg	1,427	1.66
Write-in		75	0.08
Total votes		85,504	100.0

15th District
Party	Candidate	Votes	%
Republican	Dave Honigman (incumbent)	65,592	64.47
Democratic	Vicki Barnett	32,357	31.80
Libertarian	David Thompson	3,718	3.65
Write-in		67	0.06
Total votes		101,734	100.0

16th District
Party	Candidate	Votes	%
Republican	Mat J. Dunaskiss (incumbent)	63,804	67.90
Democratic	Kevin Kelly	25,426	27.05
Libertarian	Leslie Balian	4,679	4.97
Write-in		54	0.05
Total votes		93,963	100.0

17th District
Party	Candidate	Votes	%
Democratic	Jim Berryman (incumbent)	37,667	52.52
Republican	Sharon Miller	34,032	47.45
Write-in		9	0.01
Total votes		71,708	100.0

18th District
Party	Candidate	Votes	%
Democratic	Alma Wheeler Smith	46,721	56.73
Republican	Joe Mikulec	35,593	43.22
Write-in		29	0.03
Total votes		82,343	100.0

19th District
Party	Candidate	Votes	%
Republican	Philip Hoffman (incumbent)	47,194	70.23
Democratic	Bob Clark	18,367	27.33
Libertarian	Nicholas Bennett	1,634	2.43
Total votes		67,195	100.0

20th District
Party	Candidate	Votes	%
Republican	Harry Gast (incumbent)	46,574	70.08
Democratic	John Brademas	19,815	29.81
Write-in		69	0.10
Total votes		66,458	100.0

21st District
Party	Candidate	Votes	%
Republican	Dale Shugars	42,171	57.46
Democratic	Kristin Carambula	30,383	41.40
Natural Law	Nancy Brancheau	833	1.13
Total votes		73,387	100.0

22nd District
Party	Candidate	Votes	%
Republican	William Van Regenmorter (incumbent)	62,971	77.43
Democratic	José Blanco	18,285	22.48
Write-in		63	0.07
Total votes		81,319	100.0

23rd District
Party	Candidate	Votes	%
Republican	Joanne G. Emmons (incumbent)	49,119	68.56
Democratic	Scott Manning	22,521	31.43
Write-in		1	0.00
Total votes		71,641	100.0

24th District
Party	Candidate	Votes	%
Republican	Joe Schwarz (incumbent)	54,194	65.30
Democratic	Violet Hinton	28,743	34.63
Write-in		43	0.05
Total votes		82,980	100.0

25th District
Party	Candidate	Votes	%
Democratic	Dianne Byrum	54,647	63.05
Republican	Marie Martell	32,012	36.93
Write-in		1	0.00
Total votes		86,660	100.0

26th District
Party	Candidate	Votes	%
Republican	Mike Rogers	58,046	64.34
Democratic	Mike Hatty	32,141	35.62
Write-in		28	0.03
Total votes		90,215	100.0

27th District
Party	Candidate	Votes	%
Republican	Dan DeGrow (incumbent)	56,887	66.34
Democratic	Ron Stablein	28,813	33.60
Write-in		50	0.05
Total votes		85,750	100.0

28th District
Party	Candidate	Votes	%
Democratic	John D. Cherry (incumbent)	46,741	61.63
Republican	Dominick Vincentini	29,071	38.33
Write-in		19	0.02
Total votes		75,831	100.0

29th District
Party	Candidate	Votes	%
Democratic	Joe Conroy (incumbent)	57,263	70.52
Republican	Jeff Goodrich	23,933	29.47
Write-in		2	0.00
Total votes		81,198	100.0

30th District
Party	Candidate	Votes	%
Republican	Glenn Steil Sr. (incumbent)	43,911	57.28
Democratic	David Doyle	30,719	40.07
Libertarian	Steve Butler	1,167	1.52
Natural Law	Constantine Katsoris	855	1.11
Write-in		2	0.00
Total votes		76,654	100.0

31st District
Party	Candidate	Votes	%
Republican	Dick Posthumus (incumbent)	65,919	78.91
Democratic	Donald Reid	17,604	21.07
Write-in		9	0.01
Total votes		83,532	100.0

32nd District
Party	Candidate	Votes	%
Republican	Leon Stille	48,076	59.67
Democratic	Julia Dennis	32,441	40.26
Write-in		49	0.06
Total votes		80,566	100.0

33rd District
Party	Candidate	Votes	%
Republican	Jon Cisky (incumbent)	48,647	58.23
Democratic	Rose Aquilina	34,764	41.61
Write-in		121	0.14
Total votes		83,532	100.0

34th District
Party	Candidate	Votes	%
Republican	Joel Gougeon (incumbent)	48,824	61.49
Democratic	W. Hayes	30,566	38.49
Write-in		4	0.00
Total votes		79,394	100.0

35th District
Party	Candidate	Votes	%
Republican	Bill Schuette	61,121	71.91
Democratic	Rosemary Ax	23,870	28.08
Write-in		1	0.00
Total votes		84,992	100.0

36th District
Party	Candidate	Votes	%
Republican	George A. McManus Jr. (incumbent)	65,241	70.85
Democratic	Joel Casler	26,794	29.09
Write-in		47	0.05
Total votes		92,082	100.0

37th District
Party	Candidate	Votes	%
Republican	Walter H. North	54,213	63.08
Democratic	Mike McElroy	31,711	36.90
Write-in		8	0.00
Total votes		85,932	100.0

38th District
Party	Candidate	Votes	%
Democratic	Don Koivisto (incumbent)	55,936	71.20
Republican	Charles Best	22,612	28.78
Write-in		10	0.01
Total votes		78,558	100.0

=== Special election ===
In June 1994, Governor John Engler announced a special election would be held on November 8, alongside the general election. The special election was triggered by the death of Democrat David S. Holmes Jr., on May 21. The primary election was held on August 2. The Democratic primary was won by Patricia Holmes, the daughter of David Holmes. She defeated her stepmother and David Holmes's widow, Avis Holmes. Patricia Holmes went on to win the special general election unopposed. She was sworn in on November 29.

4th District special election
Party	Candidate	Votes	%
Democratic	Patricia Holmes	15,858	100.0
Total votes		15,858	100.0

== See also ==
- 1994 Michigan House of Representatives election
