= Henry Stallings II =

American politician (1950–2015)

Member of the Michigan Senate from the 3rd district
- In office January 1, 1995 – March 31, 1998
- Preceded by: Jackie Vaughn III
- Succeeded by: Raymond M. Murphy

Personal details
- Born: December 30, 1950 San Diego, California, U.S.
- Died: September 7, 2015 (aged 64)
- Party: Democratic

Henry Stallings II (December 30, 1950 – September 7, 2015) was a member of the Michigan Senate. He represented one of the districts in Detroit.

In 1998 he investigated for allegations he had used state employees to do work at his art gallery and paid them with state funds. Though the Ethics Committee recommended expulsion, he pled guilty to a misdemeanor and resigned before a full expulsion vote could be taken.

In 2002 he ran again for the state house, but lost to Virgil Smith, Jr. in the Democratic primary. Convicted of misuse of a staffers time.

== Sources ==
- Detroit Free Press, Aug 2, 2009, p. 6A
