= John Gernaat =

American politician

John Gernaat (September 15, 1939 – October 15, 2023) was an American politician. A member of the Republican Party, he served in the Michigan House of Representatives from 1991 to 1999.

Gernaat died on October 15, 2023, at the age of 84.
