= Raymond M. Murphy =

American politician (1927–2020)

Raymond Murphy

Member of the Michigan Senate from the 3rd district
- In office 1998–2002
- Preceded by: Henry Stallings II
- Succeeded by: Irma Clark-Coleman

Member of the Michigan House of Representatives
- In office 1983–1998
- Preceded by: Frank V. Wierzbicki
- Succeeded by: Hansen Clarke
- Constituency: 17th district (1983–1992); 7th district (1993–1998)

Personal details
- Born: December 13, 1927 St. Louis, Missouri, U.S.
- Died: March 2020 (aged 92)
- Party: Democratic
- Spouse(s): Loretta, Brenda, Lynette
- Children: James Murphy, Alicia Murphy, Brandon M Murphy, Clinton L Robinson, Anita Jackson
- Education: Wayne State University, Detroit Institute of Technology

Raymond Melvin Murphy (December 13, 1927 – March 2020) was an American politician from the state of Michigan. He served in the Michigan House of Representatives from 1983 to 1998 and Michigan Senate from 1998 to 2002. He was first elected to the state Senate in a special election.

Murphy was the last surviving delegate to Michigan's 1961 constitutional convention to have also served in the Michigan Legislature.

Murphy died in March 2020, aged 92.
