= Vera B. Rison =

American politician (1939–2015)

Member of the Michigan House of Representatives from the 48th district
- In office January 1, 1997 – December 31, 2002
- Preceded by: Floyd Clack
- Succeeded by: John J. Gleason

Member of the Genesee County Board of Commissioners
- In office 1987–1996

Personal details
- Born: February 14, 1939 Shelby, Mississippi
- Died: August 31, 2015 (aged 76) Mount Morris, Michigan
- Party: Democratic

Vera Bea Rison (February 14, 1939 – August 31, 2015) was a Democratic member of the Michigan House of Representatives from 1997 through 2002.

Born in Shelby, Mississippi, Rison received her high school diploma from the Mott Adult Night School. She worked at Genesee Memorial Hospital from 1969 to 1990, and was elected to the Genesee County Board of Commissioners in 1986, serving for ten years. Considered one of the Flint area's most fervent champions, Rison was also director of human resources at the Amy Jo Manor housing complex, a member of the Genesee County Community Mental Health board, the Genesee County Substance Abuse Services board, and the Jobs Central Workforce Development board. In 1994, she received the A. Philip Randolph Institute Civil Rights Human Rights Award.

For her dedication, the Vera B. Rison Women's Shelter of Hope and Vera Rison Library were named in her honor.

Rison became the first House member in recent memory to forgo any committee assignments when she did so in the 1999–2000 session.

Due to diabetes and high blood pressure, Rison became blind, and later in life she was forced to largely leave the political scene. Rison died August 31, 2015, at her home in Mt. Morris, Michigan.
