= A.T. Frank =

American politician and judge

The Honorable A.T. Frank

Judge of Michigan's 70th District Court
- Incumbent
- Assumed office May 1, 2006 Serving with Hon. Terry L. Clark, Hon. M. Randall Jurrens, Hon. Kyle Higgs Tarrant, and Hon. M.T. Thompson

Member of the Michigan House of Representatives from the 96th district
- In office January 1, 1997 – December 31, 2002
- Preceded by: Roland J. Jersevic
- Succeeded by: Jeff Mayes

Personal details
- Born: Alfred Thomas Frank; October 5, 1966 (age 59)
- Party: Democratic
- Education: Thomas M. Cooley Law School (JD); Western Michigan University (BBA)

Alfred Thomas "A.T." Frank (born October 5, 1966) is an American politician and judge from Michigan currently serving as a judge of the 70th District Court in Saginaw County. He previously served as a Democratic member of the Michigan House of Representatives, representing parts of Saginaw and Bay counties. Frank is also a former chairman of the State Tax Commission, an agency of state government responsible for the administration of property tax laws and which assists, advises, educates, and certifies assessing officers.
