= Rose Bogardus =

American politician

Rosalyn "Rose" Bogardus

Register of Deeds
- In office 2008–2012
- Preceded by: Melvin P. McCree
- Succeeded by: merged (John J. Gleason)
- Constituency: Genesee County, Michigan

Genesee County Commissioner
- In office 2003–2008
- Constituency: District 9

Member of the Michigan House of Representatives from the 47th district
- In office January 1, 1997 – December 31, 2002
- Preceded by: Sandra Hill
- Succeeded by: Joe Hune

Genesee County Commissioner
- In office 1987–1994

Personal details
- Party: Democratic

Rosalyn "Rose" Bogardus is a Democratic Party politician from Michigan.

== Political life ==
Bogardus in 1984 was appointed by the County Board of Commissioners to a new jail citizens committee to make recommendations. This led her to run for County Commission in 1986. Rose was reelected ever 2 years and serving until 1994. In 1994, she lost an election for the Michigan House of Representatives. After that loss, she sold real estate. In 1996, she won an election as a State Representative serving until term limits forced her out in 2002. She returned to the County Board after that serving 3 terms in District 9.

Bogardus filed to run for County Register of Deeds after Melvin McCree announced that he would not run in 2008. In a 12 candidate race in the Democratic primary, she won 26% of the vote while the runner up, County Commissioner Raynetta P. Speed, got 17% of the vote. Bogardus ran on platform of getting the office ready for a merger with the County Clerk's office while Speed wanted to keep the office separate. As a County Commissioner, she votes to replace the Register of Deed's office furniture for $6,500. Facing Fredrick Wilson in the November 2008 general election, Bogardus win the election.

Bogardus sues the County Board of Commissioner after they cut the Register's Office budget for 2009-2010 claiming this causes low staffing that makes it hard to "meet my statutory obligations" and using money from a Register of Deed technology fund to fund operations. Overtime and staff on loan from other departments was approved to help out but this agreement fell apart after Bogardus was unable to document how the staff and overtime was used. Commissioners chide her for suing as budgets are being cut across all departments and hiring outside legal representative at $400/hour, while Bogardus gets the County Counsel dismissed from representing the County.

In July 2010, the County Board voted for the clerk and register of deeds offices to merger on January 1, 2013. Bogardus now objects to the merger of the two office believing that there will not be any savings as previously thought. While previously indicating she would retire after a term as the Register, she was interest in the combined Clerk/Register position.

In October 2010, the County lawsuits were settled by the County Board agreeing to add two General Fund employees to her office and agree to pay some of the legal fees.

Bogardus filed for the combine Clerk/Register of Deeds position in 2012 to oppose John J. Gleason. She withdrew from the race assuming that County Clerk Michael J. Carr would continue his campaign, but he withdrew also.

Political offices
Preceded by Melvin P. McCree	Register of Deeds of Genesee County, Michigan; 2009-2012	Succeeded by merged (John J. Gleason)
