= Laura Baird =

American judge (born 1952)

Member of the Michigan House of Representatives from the 70th district
- In office 1 January 1995 – 31 December 2000
- Preceded by: H. Lynn Jondahl
- Succeeded by: Gretchen Whitmer

Personal details
- Born: 1 October 1952 (age 73) Michigan
- Party: Democratic
- Spouse: George Zulakis
- Children: 3
- Parents: Boyd C. Baird (father); Nancy L. Tingley (mother)
- Education: Western Michigan University (B.A.); Thomas Cooley Law School (J.D.)
- Occupation: politician
- Profession: lawyer, judge

Laura L. Baird (born 1 October 1952) is an American politician and judge. She was a member of the Michigan House of Representatives from 1995 to 2000, when she was elected a judge of the Michigan Circuit Court.

== Personal life and legal career ==
Baird was born on 1 October 1952 in northern Michigan, to parents Boyd C. Baird and Nancy L. Tingley. Her father and grandfather both served as probate judges. Baird attended Western Michigan University, graduating in 1975, then earned her J.D. degree from Thomas Cooley Law School in 1979. She was placed on the court-appointed list for legal cases regarding abuse and neglect shortly after graduating from law school. Baird worked at a private legal practice, Baird & Zulakis, from 1980 to 2000, with her husband George Zulakis.

Laura Baird and George Zulakis had three children, Michael, Nicholas, and Zoe. Nicholas died in 2001. Zoe enrolled at the University of Minnesota Law School in 2018. Laura Baird's father Boyd C. Baird died in 2008.

== Political career ==
Baird later moved to Okemos, Michigan, and was Ingham County commissioner from 1992 to 1994, representing the 11th district. She ran for the 70th district seat on the Michigan House of Representatives in 1994, as a Democratic Party candidate, and won. Baird was elected to another term in 1996, and remained in office from 1 January 1997 to 31 December 2000. Baird was elected a judge of the Michigan Circuit Court in 2000, 2006, 2012, and 2018. In 2013, Baird was elected vice president of the Michigan Judges Association, and became president of the MJA in December 2015.
