= Lingg Brewer =

American politician

Lingg C. Brewer (born October 13, 1944) is an American politician and educator.

Brewer was born in Lansing, Michigan and lived in Holt, Michigan with his wife and family. He went to Lansing Community College and received his bachelor's degree from Michigan State University. Brewer taught at Lansing Community College. Brewer served on the Ingham County Commission from 1974 to 1976 and as Ingham County Clerk from 1977 to 1982. Brewer served in the Michigan House of Representatives from 1995 to 2000 and was a Democrat.
