= Charles R. Perricone =

American politician

67th Speaker of the Michigan House of Representatives
- In office January 13, 1999 – December 31, 2000
- Governor: John Engler
- Preceded by: Curtis Hertel
- Succeeded by: Rick Johnson

Member of the Michigan House of Representatives from the 61st district
- In office January 1, 1995 – December 31, 2000
- Preceded by: Dale Shugars
- Succeeded by: Tom George

Personal details
- Born: October 10, 1960 (age 65)
- Party: Republican
- Spouse: Jennifer
- Children: Chase, Sam, and Elizabeth
- Education: Western Michigan University

Charles R. Perricone (born October 10, 1960) is a Michigan politician who served in the Michigan House of Representatives from 1995 to 2000, including as Speaker of the House for his final term.

Perricone attended Kalamazoo College from 1979 to 1981 and earned a B.B.A. degree cum laude from Western Michigan University. He is a tax accountant, licensed insurance agent, and an adjunct instructor in the insurance program at Olivet College. He was a member of the Kalamazoo Township Planning Commissioner from 1991 to 1994, a former cable television host, high school football official, vice chairman of the Southwest Michigan Arthritis Association, instructor with Junior Achievement, and member of the Citizens' Hazardous Waste Committee.
