= 2023 Warren mayoral election =

- August 8, 2023 (first round); November 6, 2023 (Runoff)

Candidate	Lori Stone	George L. Dimas	Patrick Green
First round	5,023; 27.68%	6,099; 33.61%	4,796; 26.43%
Runoff	11,877; 53.11%	10,488; 46.89%	Eliminated
Mayor before election
James R. Fouts
Nonpartisan
Elected mayor
Lori Stone
Nonpartisan

The 2023 Warren mayoral election took place on November 6, 2023, following a primary on August 8, 2023. Following an amendment to the city charter in 2020, incumbent mayor James R. Fouts was term-limited and ineligible to seek re-election.

== Background ==
Incumbent Mayor James R. Fouts attempted to seek a fifth term, but was barred from doing so by a 2020 amendment to the city charter. Fouts attempted to challenge the legality of the amendment and filed for re-election, but the Michigan Court of Appeals upheld the amendment and disqualified Fouts.

== Primary election ==
=== Candidates ===
- Lori Stone, state representative from the 13th district (2019–present)
- George L. Dimas, Warren Human Resources director
- Patrick Green, president of the Warren City Council and former state representative from the 28th district (2016–2018)
- Michelle Nard, Macomb County commissioner
- Scott Cameron Stevens, former city councilor
- Alfonso King, retired autoworker

=== Results ===
2023 Warren mayoral primary election
Party	Candidate	Votes	%
Nonpartisan	George L. Dimas	6,099	33.61%
Nonpartisan	Lori Stone	5,023	27.68%
Nonpartisan	Patrick Green	4,796	26.43%
Nonpartisan	Michelle Nard	969	5.34%
Nonpartisan	Scott Cameron Stevens	754	4.16%
Nonpartisan	Alfonso King	504	2.78%
Total votes		18,145	100.00%

== General election ==
=== Results ===
2023 Warren mayoral general election
Party	Candidate	Votes	%
Nonpartisan	Lori Stone	11,877	53.11%
Nonpartisan	George L. Dimas	10,488	46.89%
Total votes		22,365	100.00%
