= Michigan's 9th Senate district =

American legislative district

Michigan's 9th State Senate district
Senator
Michael Webber; R–Rochester Hills
- Demographics: 69% White; 4.7% Black; 3.6% Hispanic; 17.5% Asian; 0.2% Native American; 0.1% Hawaiian/Pacific Islander; 0.6% Other; 4.4% Multiracial
- Population (2024): 264,161

Michigan's 9th Senate district is one of 38 districts in the Michigan Senate. The 9th district was created by the 1850 Michigan Constitution, as the 1835 constitution only permitted a maximum of eight senate districts. It has been represented by Republican Michael Webber since 2023, succeeding Democrat Paul Wojno.

== Geography ==
District 9 encompasses parts of Macomb and Oakland counties.

=== 2011 Apportionment Plan ===
District 9, as dictated by the 2011 Apportionment Plan, covered the inner suburbs of Detroit in southern Macomb County, including Warren, Roseville, Eastpointe, Fraser, Center Line, and part of Clinton Township.

The district was located entirely within Michigan's 9th congressional district, and overlapped with the 18th, 22nd, 25th, 28th, and 31st districts of the Michigan House of Representatives.

== List of senators ==
Senator	Party	Dates	Residence	Notes
Richard Kent	Democratic	1853–1854	Adrian	
Henry M. Boies	Republican	1855–1856	Hudson	
Lewis Welch	Republican	1857–1860	Exeter	
Samuel Mulholland	Republican	1861–1862	Vienna	
William Corbin	Democratic	1863–1864	Petersburg	Elected on a Fusionist ticket.
Nathaniel Langdon	Democratic	1865–1866	Ida	
Andrew Howell	Republican	1867–1868	Adrian	
Henry C. Conkling	Republican	1869–1870	Tecumseh	
William S. Wilcox	Republican	1871–1872	Adrian	
William R. Stoddard	Republican	1873	Litchfield	Died in office.
John P. Cook	Democratic	1874	Hillsdale	
John M. Osborn	Republican	1875–1876	Hudson	
Witter J. Baxter	Republican	1877–1878	Jonesville	
Alexander Hewitt	Republican	1879–1880	Hillsdale	
Albert Dickerman	Republican	1881–1882	Hillsdale	
Ezra L. Koon	Republican	1883–1884	Hillsdale	
George A. Smith	Republican	1885–1886	Somerset	
W. Irving Babcock	Republican	1887–1890	Niles	
John S. Beers	Democratic	1891–1892	Stevensville	
Frank W. Clapp	Republican	1893–1896	Battle Creek	
Huston B. Colman	Republican	1897–1898	Kalamazoo	
Addison M. Brown	Republican	1899–1900	Schoolcraft	
Arthur D. Bangham	Republican	1901–1904	Homer	
Jesse R. Cropsey	Republican	1905–1908	Vicksburg	
Albert C. Kingman	Republican	1909–1912	Battle Creek	
Henry E. Straight	Republican	1913–1916	Coldwater	
George L. Bolen	Democratic	1917–1918	Battle Creek	
James Henry	Republican	1919–1925	Battle Creek	Died in office.
Joseph E. Watson	Republican	1925–1928	Bronson	
Edward L. Branson	Republican	1929–1932	Battle Creek	
Francis A. Kulp	Democratic	1933–1934	Battle Creek	
Joseph A. Baldwin	Republican	1935–1936	Albion	
Mark L. Crawford	Democratic	1937–1938	Coldwater	
Joseph A. Baldwin	Republican	1939–1944	Albion	
Warren G. Hooper	Republican	1945	Albion	Murdered in office.
Robert J. Hamilton	Republican	1945–1948	Battle Creek	
Creighton R. Coleman	Republican	1949–1956	Marshall	
John P. Smeekens	Republican	1957–1964	Coldwater	
Stanley J. Novak	Democratic	1965–1974	Detroit	
Thomas Guastello	Democratic	1975–1982	Sterling Heights	
David M. Serotkin	Democratic	1983	Mount Clemens	Recalled.
Kirby Holmes	Republican	1984–1986	Utica	
Doug Carl	Republican	1987–1994	Mount Clemens	
R. Robert Geake	Republican	1995–1998	Northville	
Thaddeus McCotter	Republican	1999–2002	Livonia	
Dennis Olshove	Democratic	2003–2010	Warren	
Steve Bieda	Democratic	2011–2018	Warren	
Paul Wojno	Democratic	2019–2022	Warren	
Michael Webber	Republican	2023–present	Rochester Hills	
Theresa Brooks	Democratic	(Note: Member-elect.)		

== Recent election results ==
=== 2020s ===
2026 Michigan Senate election
Primary election
Party	Candidate	Votes	%
Republican	Michael Webber (incumbent)	20,148	100
Total votes		20,148	100
Democratic	Theresa Brooks	17,487	46.73
Democratic	Brendan Johnson	11,243	30.05
Democratic	Ren Nushaj	8,690	23.22
Total votes		37,420	100
General election
Democratic	Theresa Brooks	64,507	52.48
Republican	Michael Webber (incumbent)	55,947	45.52
Working Class	Jacob R. Schodowski	1,466	1.19
Independent	Philippe M. Cicchini	992	0.81
Total votes		122,912	100
Democratic gain from Republican			

2022 Michigan Senate election, District 9
Party	Candidate	Votes	%
Republican	Michael Webber	57,953	50.3
Democratic	Padma Kuppa	57,158	49.7
Total votes		115,111	100
Republican gain from Democratic			

=== 2018 ===
2018 Michigan Senate election, District 9
Primary election
Party	Candidate	Votes	%
Democratic	Paul Wojno	18,488	63.4
Democratic	Kristina Lodovisi	10,688	36.6
Total votes		29,176	100
Republican	Jeff Bonnell	7,861	52.9
Republican	Fred Kuplicki	7,003	47.1
Total votes		14,864	100
General election
Democratic	Paul Wojno	65,736	65.9
Republican	Jeff Bonnell	34,013	34.1
Total votes		99,749	100
Democratic hold			

=== 2014 ===
2014 Michigan Senate election, District 9
Party	Candidate	Votes	%
Democratic	Steve Bieda (incumbent)	48,146	68.0
Republican	Hawke Fracassa	22,699	32.0
Total votes		70,845	100
Democratic hold			

=== Federal and statewide results ===
Year	Office	Results
2020	President	Biden 56.9 – 41.6%
2018	Senate	Stabenow 60.6 – 37.0%
2018	Governor	Whitmer 61.0 – 35.8%
2016	President	Clinton 53.4 – 42.3%
2014	Senate	Peters 63.6 – 31.4%
2014	Governor	Schauer 54.6 – 42.9%
2012	President	Obama 62.7 – 36.3%
2012	Senate	Stabenow 69.3 – 27.2%

== Historical district boundaries ==
Map	Description	Apportionment Plan	Notes
	Wayne County (part); Detroit (part)	1964 Apportionment Plan	
	Lapeer County (part); Almont Township; Macomb County (part); Armada Township; Bruce Township; Chesterfield Township; Clinton Township (part); Harrison Township; Lenox Township; Macomb Township; New Baltimore (part); Ray Township; Richmond; Richmond Township; Shelby Township; Sterling Heights; Utica; Washington Township; St. Clair County (part); Algonac; Berlin Township; Casco Township; China Township; Clay Township; Columbus Township; Cottrellville Township; East China Township; Ira Township; Marine City; Marysville; New Baltimore (part); Port Huron Township; St. Clair; St. Clair Township; Wales Township	1972 Apportionment Plan	
	Macomb County (part); Armada Township; Bruce Township; Chesterfield Township; Lenox Township; Macomb Township; Memphis; New Baltimore; Ray Township; Richmond Township; Shelby Township; Sterling Heights; Utica; Richmond; Washington Township	1982 Apportionment Plan	
	Wayne County (part); Canton Township (part); Livonia; Northville; Northville Township; Plymouth; Plymouth Township; Redford Township	1992 Apportionment Plan	
	Macomb County (part); Center Line; Eastpointe; Fraser; Lake Township; St. Clair Shores; Warren	2001 Apportionment Plan	
	Macomb County (part); Center Line; Clinton Township (part); Eastpointe; Fraser; Roseville; Warren	2011 Apportionment Plan	
