= James DeSana =

American politician

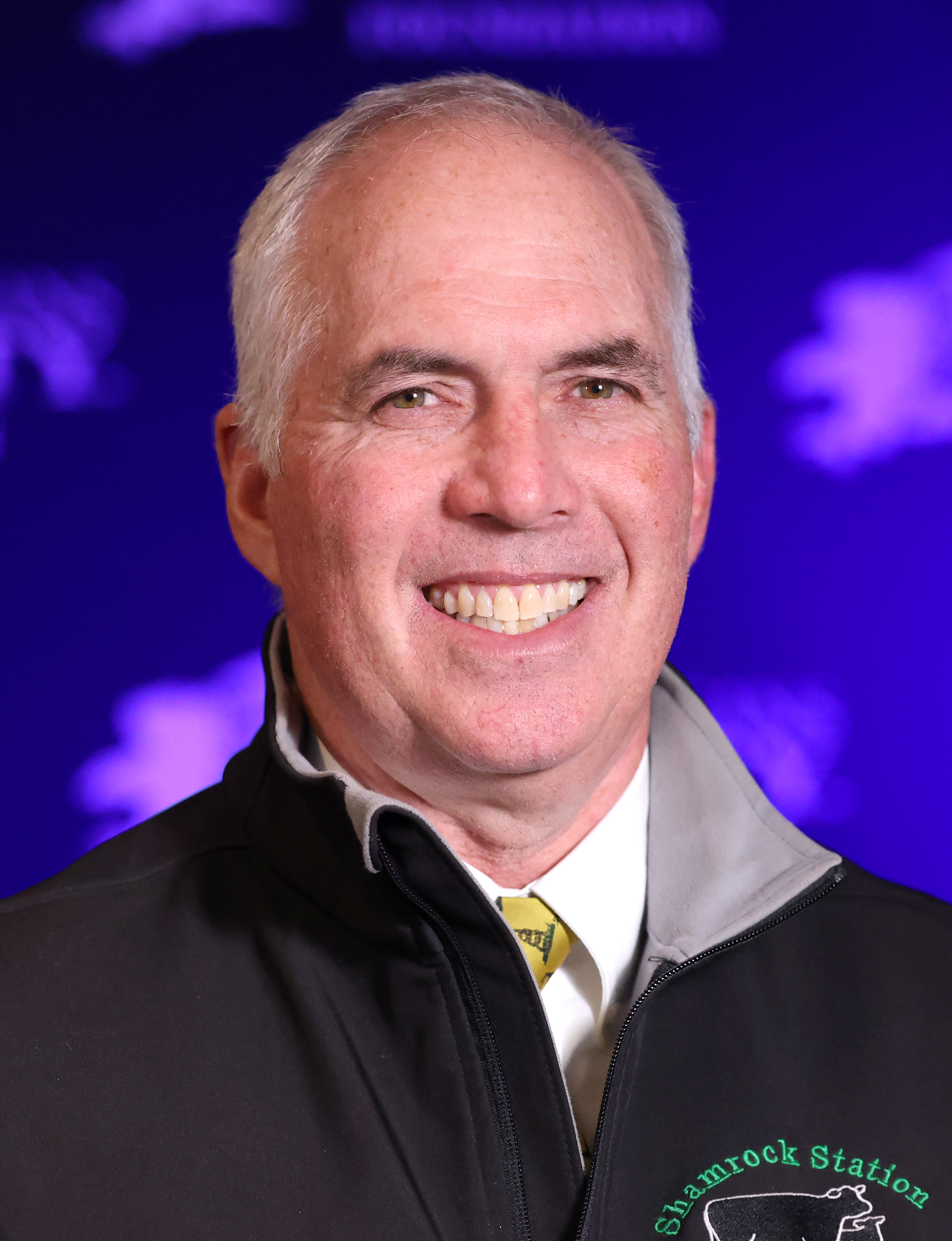
- DeSana in 2024

Member of the Michigan House of Representatives from the 29th district
- Incumbent
- Assumed office January 1, 2023
- Preceded by: Brenda Carter

Personal details
- Born: June 21, 1963 (age 63)
- Party: Republican
- Spouse: Stephanie
- Children: 8
- Parent: James DeSana Sr. (father)
- Education: Bachelor's degree in business administration and management from University of Detroit Mercy
- Profession: Farmer

James DeSana is an American politician serving as a member of the Michigan House of Representatives, representing the 29th district since 2023. He is a member of the Republican Party.

== Early life and career ==
DeSana graduated with a bachelor's degree in business administration from the University of Detroit Mercy in 1987, which after earning his degree, he worked in the fastener manufacturing industry for over 36 years. He is also an NCAA baseball umpire.

== Political career ==
DeSana ran to represent the 29th district of the Michigan House of Representatives in the 2022 Michigan House of Representatives election, winning with 18,042 votes and 51.5% of the vote. A prayer event organized by DeSana was held shortly before he was sworn in. He was reelected in 2024, defeating Democratic candidate Kyle Wright with 55% of the vote. He supports repealing the state's wholesale tax on marijuana which came into effect at the start of 2026, claiming that the tax has not met expectations and is "an unnecessary burden on working people and Michigan’s legal cannabis industry".

DeSana has come into conflict with fellow Republican state representative Jamie Thompson, with DeSana telling reporters that he and Thompson have had issues with each other for a long time. In June 2026, denigrating comments made by DeSana about Thompson and other representatives were leaked to the public, with Thompson subsequently saying that she would not return to the legislature unless the comments were addressed.

== Personal life ==
DeSana and his wife Stephanie have eight children. He is Catholic.

DeSana is the son of James DeSana Sr., who had served multiple terms as mayor of Wyandotte, Michigan and served as Downriver's senate representative from 1976 to 1986.
