= Michigan's 29th House of Representatives district =

American legislative district

Michigan's 29th State House of Representatives district
Representative
James DeSana; R–Carleton
- Demographics: 73.7% White; 13.4% Black; 6.1% Hispanic; 1.1% Asian; 0.1% Native American; 0.3% Other; 5.4% Multiracial
- Population (2024): 91,725

Michigan's 29th House of Representatives district is a legislative district within the Michigan House of Representatives located in the counties of Monroe and Wayne. The district was created in 1965, when the Michigan Supreme Court ordered the reapportionment of state legislative districts from a county-based system to a proportional one following the Supreme Court case Reynolds v. Sims. It is currently represented by Republican James DeSana of Carleton.

== List of representatives ==
Representative	Party	Years	Residence	Notes
Alfred A. Sheridan	Democratic	1965–1982	Taylor	Died January 1982.
Rick C. Sitz	Democratic	1982 (Note: Elected in a 1982 special election to replace Rep. Alfred A. Sheridan, who died.)–1988	Taylor	
Gregory E. Pitoniak	Democratic	1989–1992	Taylor	Redistricted to the 22nd district.
Dennis G. Olshove	Democratic	1993–1998	Warren	Redistricted from the 25th district; term limited.
Jennifer Faunce	Republican	1999–2002	Warren	
Clarence E. Phillips	Democratic	2003–2006	Pontiac	Redistricted from the 43rd district; resigned January 2006 after being elected mayor of Pontiac.
Hayes Jones	Democratic	2006 (Note: Elected in a 2006 special election to replace Rep. Clarence E. Phillips, who resigned.)	Pontiac	
Tim W. Melton	Democratic	2007–2011	Auburn Hills	Resigned September 2011 to work for education reform lobbying firm StudentsFirst.
Tim Greimel	Democratic	2012 (Note: Elected in a 2012 special election to replace Rep. Tim W. Melton, who resigned.)–2018	Pontiac (until around 2012); Auburn Hills	Term limited.
Brenda Carter	Democratic	2019–2022	Pontiac	Redistricted to the 53rd district.
James DeSana	Republican	2023–present	Ash Township (until around 2024); Carleton	

== Historical district boundaries ==
Map	Description	Apportionment Plan	Notes
	Wayne County (part): Brownstown Township; Taylor Township; Rockwood; Trenton (part)	1964 Apportionment Plan	
	Wayne County (part): Brownstown Township; Flat Rock; Gibraltar; Rockwood; Taylor (part); Trenton (part); Woodhaven	1972 Apportionment Plan	
	Wayne County (part): Taylor	1982 Apportionment Plan	
	Macomb County (part): Sterling Heights (part); Warren (part)	1992 Apportionment Plan	
	Oakland County (part): Auburn Hills; Pontiac	2001 Apportionment Plan	
	Oakland County (part): Auburn Hills; Keego Harbor; Orchard Lake Village; Pontiac; Sylvan Lake	2011 Apportionment Plan	
	Monroe County (part): Ash Township; Frenchtown Township (part); Monroe (part); Wayne County (part): Huron Township; Romulus (part); Taylor (part)	2021 Apportionment Plan	

== Recent elections ==
=== 2020s ===
2026 Michigan House of Representatives election
Party	Candidate	Votes	%
Republican	James DeSana (incumbent)	19,465	51.47
Democratic	Darian Counts	18,354	48.53
Total votes		37,819	100
Republican hold			

2024 Michigan House of Representatives election
Party	Candidate	Votes	%
Republican	James DeSana (incumbent)	25,669	55.03
Democratic	Kyle Wright	20,975	44.97
Total votes		46,644	100
Republican hold			

2022 Michigan House of Representatives election
Party	Candidate	Votes	%
Republican	James DeSana	18,042	51.48
Democratic	Alex Garza	17,002	48.52
Total votes		35,044	100
Republican gain from Democratic			

2020 Michigan House of Representatives election
Party	Candidate	Votes	%
Democratic	Brenda Carter (incumbent)	27,099	72.89
Republican	S. Dave Sullivan	10,079	27.11
Total votes		37,178	100
Democratic hold			

=== 2010s ===
2018 Michigan House of Representatives election
Party	Candidate	Votes	%
Democratic	Brenda Carter	19,964	74.11
Republican	Timothy D. Carrier	6,974	25.89
Total votes		26,938	100
Democratic hold			

2016 Michigan House of Representatives election
Party	Candidate	Votes	%
Democratic	Tim Greimel (incumbent)	23,097	71.25
Republican	Garren W. Griffith	8,253	25.46
Green	Artelia Marie Leak	1,068	3.29
Total votes		32,418	100
Democratic hold			

2014 Michigan House of Representatives election
Party	Candidate	Votes	%
Democratic	Tim Greimel (incumbent)	15,042	73.66
Republican	David Lonier	5,380	26.34
Total votes		20,422	100
Democratic hold			

2012 Michigan House of Representatives election
Party	Candidate	Votes	%
Democratic	Tim Greimel (incumbent)	25,577	77.4
Republican	Brian Stebick	7,467	22.6
Total votes		33,044	100
Democratic hold			

2012 Michigan House of Representatives 29th district special election
Party	Candidate	Votes	%
Democratic	Tim Greimel	7,056	76.95
Republican	Bob Gray	2,114	23.05
Total votes		9,170	100
Democratic hold			

2010 Michigan House of Representatives election
Party	Candidate	Votes	%
Democratic	Tim Melton (incumbent)	14,217	78.29
Republican	Bret D. Allen	3,943	21.71
Total votes		18,160	100
Democratic hold			

=== 2000s ===
2008 Michigan House of Representatives election
Party	Candidate	Votes	%
Democratic	Tim Melton (incumbent)	25,700	83.51
Republican	Scott E. Sampeer	5,074	16.49
Total votes		30,774	100
Democratic hold			

2006 Michigan House of Representatives election
Party	Candidate	Votes	%
Democratic	Tim Melton	16,591	75.99
Republican	Tom March	4,131	18.92
Independent	Mary Barr	1,110	5.08
Total votes		21,832	100
Democratic hold			

2006 Michigan House of Representatives 29th district special election
Party	Candidate	Votes	%
Democratic	Hayes W. Jones	16,423	76.72
Republican	Tom March	4,983	23.28
Total votes		21,406	100
Democratic hold			

2004 Michigan House of Representatives election
Party	Candidate	Votes	%
Democratic	Clarence E. Phillips (incumbent)	22,272	74.54
Republican	Samantha Moffett	7,607	25.46
Total votes		29,879	100
Democratic hold			

2002 Michigan House of Representatives election
Party	Candidate	Votes	%
Democratic	Clarence E. Phillips	13,675	76.11
Republican	Tom March	4,292	23.89
Total votes		17,967	100
Democratic gain from Republican			

2000 Michigan House of Representatives election
Party	Candidate	Votes	%
Republican	Jennifer Faunce (incumbent)	21,292	52.33
Democratic	Steve Bieda	18,967	46.61
Libertarian	E. Dean Sahutske	308	0.76
U.S. Taxpayers'	Steven T. Revis	124	0.3
Total votes		40,691	100
Republican hold			

=== 1990s ===
1998 Michigan House of Representatives election
Party	Candidate	Votes	%
Republican	Jennifer Faunce	16,858	51.47
Democratic	Charles T Busse	15,370	46.92
Libertarian	E. Dean Sahutske	528	1.61
Total votes		32,756	100
Republican gain from Democratic			
