= Dennis Olshove =

American politician

Member of the Michigan Senate from the 9th district
- In office January 1, 2003 – December 31, 2010
- Preceded by: Thaddeus McCotter
- Succeeded by: Steve Bieda

Member of the Michigan House of Representatives
- In office January 1, 1991 – December 31, 1998
- Preceded by: D. Roman Kulchitsky
- Succeeded by: Jennifer Faunce
- Constituency: 25th district (1991–1992); 29th district (1993–1998)

Personal details
- Born: January 18, 1950 (age 76) Detroit, Michigan, U.S.
- Party: Democratic
- Spouse: Fran
- Education: Michigan State University

Dennis Olshove (born January 18, 1950) is a politician from the U.S. state of Michigan. He is a former Democratic member of both houses of the Michigan Legislature and a current member of the Michigan Liquor Control Commission.

== Personal ==
Dennis Olshove and his wife Fran were married in 1980. They have four children: Steven (Chelsea), Michael (Jenna), Marc, and Ryan. They also have three grandchildren.

== Early life ==
Olshove attended De La Salle Collegiate High School, a Catholic, college preparatory high school previously located in Detroit, Michigan, before moving to Warren, Michigan, in 1982. He went to Michigan State University and has a B.A. in Communications.

== Political career ==
Olshove served in the Michigan House of Representatives from 1991 to 1998. From 1999 to 2002, Olshove served on the Macomb County Board of Commissioners. Olshove was first elected to serve in the Michigan Senate in 2002, and won re-election in 2006. In June 2012, Governor Rick Snyder appointed Olshove to an unexpired term on the Michigan Liquor Control Commission.

== Electoral history ==
- 2006 election for Michigan State Senate - Michigan 9th District

Name	Percent
Dennis Olshove (D)	66.3%
Jeremy Neilson (R)	29.7%
Richard Kuszmar (G)	1.4%
James Allison (L)	2.6%

- 2002 election for Michigan State Senate - Michigan 9th District

Name	Percent
Dennis Olshove (D)	60.8%
Cecelia Stevens (R)	36.6%
Keith Edwards (L)	2.6%
