= Mai Xiong =

American politician (born 1984)

Member of the Michigan House of Representatives from the 13th district
- Incumbent
- Assumed office April 30, 2024
- Preceded by: Lori Stone

Macomb County Commissioner
- In office January 1, 2021 – April 30, 2024
- Preceded by: Marvin Sauger
- Succeeded by: Gus Ghanam
- Constituency: 2nd district (2021–2022); 11th district (2023–2024)

Personal details
- Born: December 19, 1984 (age 41) Loei, Thailand
- Party: Democratic
- Spouse: Adam Kue (m. 2011)
- Children: 4
- Education: College for Creative Studies (BFA); Western Governors University (MBA)

Mai Hlee Xiong (born December 19, 1984) is a Hmong American businesswoman and politician serving as a member of the Michigan House of Representatives since 2024, representing the 13th district. A member of the Democratic Party, she previously served as a member of the Macomb County Board of Commissioners from 2021 to 2024. She is the first Hmong American to serve in the Michigan Legislature.

== Early life ==
Xiong was born in the Ban Vinai Refugee Camp in the Loei province of Thailand to a Hmong family. At the age of 3, Xiong's family moved to Ohio after being accepted into the United States as refugees. Due to having extended family in Metro Detroit, Xiong and her siblings spent a lot of time in the area while growing up.

== Education ==
In 2003, Xiong was accepted into the College for Creative Studies in Detroit, Michigan. During her studies, she moved to Warren, Michigan and interned at Campbell Ewald. Xiong graduated in 2007 with a Bachelor of Fine Arts in Graphic Design.

Xiong later graduated from the Michigan Political Leadership Program (MPLP) at Michigan State University. She is also a graduate of the Senior Executives in State and Local Government program at Harvard Kennedy School.

== Career ==
In 2017, Xiong founded the brand Mai&Co, an apparel company inspired by traditional Hmong clothing. She is fluent in the Hmong language and helps as a language interpreter for a translation and interpretation organization.

Xiong previously served as a volunteer Board Member of the Macomb Food Program, a nonprofit working to raise funds and feed the hungry in Macomb County, Michigan. She is also a coordinator for Adopt-A-County Road, a program where participants help maintain roads by cleaning up trash and litter.

In August 2020, Xiong challenged incumbent Macomb County Commissioner Marvin Sauger in the Democratic primary where she finished in first place with 37.3% of the vote. Xiong later won the general election in November with 54.5% of the vote.

During her first term, Xiong led the commission in appropriating $300,000 for the 2023 budget to go towards the county's food pantry distribution program. Xiong also worked to increase funding for Turning Point, a nonprofit intended to support victims of domestic violence and sexual assault. In addition, she also worked to secure funding for Martha T. Berry, a county health facility that works with the elderly.

In 2022, Xiong was re-elected to a second term with 56.7% of the vote.

In 2023, Xiong challenged Warren City Clerk Sonja Buffa. Despite making it through the primary, Xiong lost the general election with 46.2% of the vote.

In 2023, Lori Stone, a Michigan State Representative, resigned after being elected mayor of Warren. Xiong announced her candidacy for the special election and won the Democratic primary in January 2024. She later won the general election with 65.6% of the vote.

In November 2024, following court-mandated redistricting, Xiong sought re-election in the new 13th district and won the general election for a full term with 50.8% of the vote.

In March 2025, Xiong broke party lines to vote in favor of a resolution urging enforcement of the federal ban on transgender girls in women’s sports (HR 0040), but later in August voted against House Bill 4066, which would have codified such restrictions into Michigan law.

== Personal life ==
Xiong and her husband, Adam, met in 2008 before getting married in 2011. Both are Hmong American and they have four children together.

Xiong was a victim of a cyber stalker and her story was featured in the ID Discovery program Stalked: Someone's Watching.

Xiong is a member of the Sierra Club and a Green Michigan.

== Electoral history ==
2024 Michigan House of Representatives special general election, 13th district
Party	Candidate	Votes	%
Democratic	Mai Xiong	5,741	65.63%
Republican	Ronald A. Singer	3,007	34.37%
Total votes		8,748	100%
Democratic hold			

2024 Michigan House of Representatives general election, 13th district
Party	Candidate	Votes	%
Democratic	Mai Xiong (incumbent)	24,911	50.82%
Republican	Ronald A. Singer	22,673	46.26%
Working Class	Hashim Malik Bakari	1,430	2.92%
Total votes		49,014	100%
Democratic hold			
