= Tullio Liberati =

American politician (born 1968)

Member of the Michigan House of Representatives from the 2nd district
- Incumbent
- Assumed office January 1, 2023
- Preceded by: Joe Tate

Member of the Michigan House of Representatives from the 13th district
- In office January 1, 2021 – December 31, 2022
- Preceded by: Frank Liberati
- Succeeded by: Lori Stone

Personal details
- Born: c. 1968 (age 57–58) Allen Park, Michigan, U.S.
- Party: Democratic
- Children: 2
- Education: Wayne State University
- Website: House website

Tullio Liberati Jr. (born July 3, 1968) is an American politician serving as a member of the Michigan House of Representatives since 2021, currently representing the 2nd district. He is a member of the Democratic Party.

== Early life and education ==
Liberati was born July 3, 1968 in Allen Park, Michigan or Detroit, Michigan, the son of a public school educator. Liberati graduated from St. Frances Cabrini High School in 1986. Liberati studied biology at Wayne State University.

== Early career ==
Liberati spent his summers during college working in construction. Around 2000, Liberati founded and is the current president of the company Liberati and Sons Construction.

== State legislature ==
On November 3, 2020, Liberati was elected to the Michigan House of Representatives, where he represented the 13th district. He succeeded his brother, term-limited State Representative Frank Liberati.

He was re-elected with over 60% of the vote in 2022, this time to the 2nd district due to redistricting in the state. He was again reelected in 2024.

In 2025, Liberati broke party lines to vote in favor of a resolution calling for the federal ban on transgender girls in women's sports under the Trump administration to be enforced in the state of Michigan.

== Personal life ==
Around 1994, Liberati married Constance "Connie" Ghist. Together, they have two children, both graduates of Allen Park Public Schools. Liberati is Catholic.
