= Nate Shannon =

American politician from Michigan

Member of the Michigan House of Representatives
- In office January 1, 2019 – January 1, 2025
- Preceded by: Henry Yanez
- Succeeded by: Ron Robinson
- Constituency: 25th District (2019–2022); 58th District (2023–2025)

Personal details
- Party: Democratic
- Spouse: Lori
- Children: 3
- Education: Oakland University; Wayne State University
- Website: Nate For State Rep

Nate Shannon is an American former politician who was a Democratic Party member of the Michigan House of Representatives. He represented the 25th district from 2019 to 2022 and the 58th district from 2023 to 2025. Before being elected as a state representative, Shannon worked as a high school teacher, following in the footsteps of his public school teacher parents.

Political offices
Preceded by Henry Yanez	Michigan Representatives; 25th District; 2019–2022	Succeeded by Kevin Coleman
Preceded by Andrew Fink	Michigan Representatives; 58th District; 2023–2025	Succeeded by Ron Robinson
