= Andrew Kandrevas =

American politician from Michigan

Member of the Michigan House of Representatives from the 13th district
- In office 2009–2015
- Preceded by: Barbara A. Farrah
- Succeeded by: Frank Liberati

Personal details
- Born: February 12, 1975 (age 51) Lincoln Park, Michigan
- Party: Democratic
- Spouse: Altinia
- Education: University of Michigan; Wayne State University Law School
- Occupation: Attorney

Andrew Kandrevas (born February 12, 1975) is a Democratic member of the Michigan House of Representatives, representing the 13th district. Prior to his service in the legislature, Kandrevas served as president of the Southgate City Council and as a prosecutor for Wayne County.
