= Jennifer Faunce =

American politician and judge

Member of the Michigan House of Representatives from the 29th district
- In office January 1, 1999 – December 2002
- Preceded by: Dennis Olshove

16th Circuit Court in Macomb County, Michigan
- Incumbent
- Assumed office July 2013 (appointed)
- Preceded by: David Viviano

Personal details
- Born: January 6, 1965 (age 61) Warren, Michigan, U.S.
- Party: Republican
- Spouse: Daryl Brown (died 2018)
- Children: 2
- Parents: Sherman Faunce (father); Dorothy Faunce (mother)
- Relatives: Suzanne Faunce (sister)
- Occupation: Politician, judge
- Known for: Sworn in as a judge by her father

Jennifer Faunce (born January 6, 1965) is an American politician and judge from Michigan. Faunce is a judge of the Macomb County Circuit Court in Michigan. Previously she was a judge of the 37th District Court based in Warren Michigan from 2003-2013. Faunce was a Republican member of the Michigan House of Representatives.

== Early life ==
On January 6, 1965, Faunce was born in Warren, Michigan. Faunce' father was Sherman Faunce, a judge of the district court in Warren. Faunce's mother is Dorothy Faunce. Faunce has a sister, Suzanne.

== Education ==
Faunce earned a bachelor's degree from Michigan State University and a JD degree from the University of Detroit Mercy.

== Career ==
From 1992 to 1998 Faunce was an assistant Macomb County prosecutor. She was head of the juvenile crimes division for part of this time. For part of her time in the prosecutor's office she was chief of the juvenile division.

On November 3, 1998, Faunce won the election and became a Republican member of Michigan House of Representatives for District 29. Faunce defeated Charles T. Busse and E. Dean Sahutske with 51.47% of the votes. On November 7, 2000, as an incumbent, Faunce won the election and continued serving District 29. Faunce defeated Steve Bieda, E. Dean Sahutske, and Steven T. Revis with 52.33% of the votes.

In 2003, Faunce became a judge of the 37th District Court. In July 2013, Faunce was appointed by governor Rick Snyder to become a judge of the 16th Circuit Court in Macomb County, Michigan. Faunce replaced Judge David Viviano, who was appointed to the state supreme court. In 2014, Faunce won the election unopposed and continued serving as a judge. Faunce was sworn in along with her sister Suzanne Faunce by Sherman Faunce, her father.

== Personal life ==
Faunce's husband was Daryl Brown (died 2018), a retired police officer with Sterling Heights Police Department. They have two children.

Faunce's sister Suzanne Faunce is a district court judge in Warren, Michigan.
