= Theresa Brooks =

American politician

Member-elect of the Michigan Senate from the 9th district
- Assuming office January 2027
- Succeeding: Michael Webber

Personal details
- Party: Democratic

Theresa Brooks is an American politician. A member of the Democratic Party, she is the member-elect for the 9th district of the Michigan Senate.
