= Robert Kosowski =

American politician from Michigan

Robert L. Kosowski

Member of the Michigan House of Representatives from the 16th district
- In office January 1, 2013 – January 1, 2019
- Preceded by: Bob Constan
- Succeeded by: Kevin Coleman

Personal details
- Born: January 8, 1964 (age 62) Detroit, Michigan
- Party: Democratic
- Spouse: Elizabeth Kosowski
- Children: 2
- Occupation: Politician, lobbyist

Robert Kosowski (born January 8, 1964) is a lobbyist and former politician from Michigan.

== Career ==
Kosowski is a former member of the Michigan House of Representatives from District 16, representing a district based in Westland, Michigan.

== Personal life ==
Kosowski's wife is Elizabeth. They have two sons. Kosowski is a former resident of Westland, Michigan. Kosowski and his family live in Holt, Michigan.
