= Henry Yanez =

American politician from Michigan

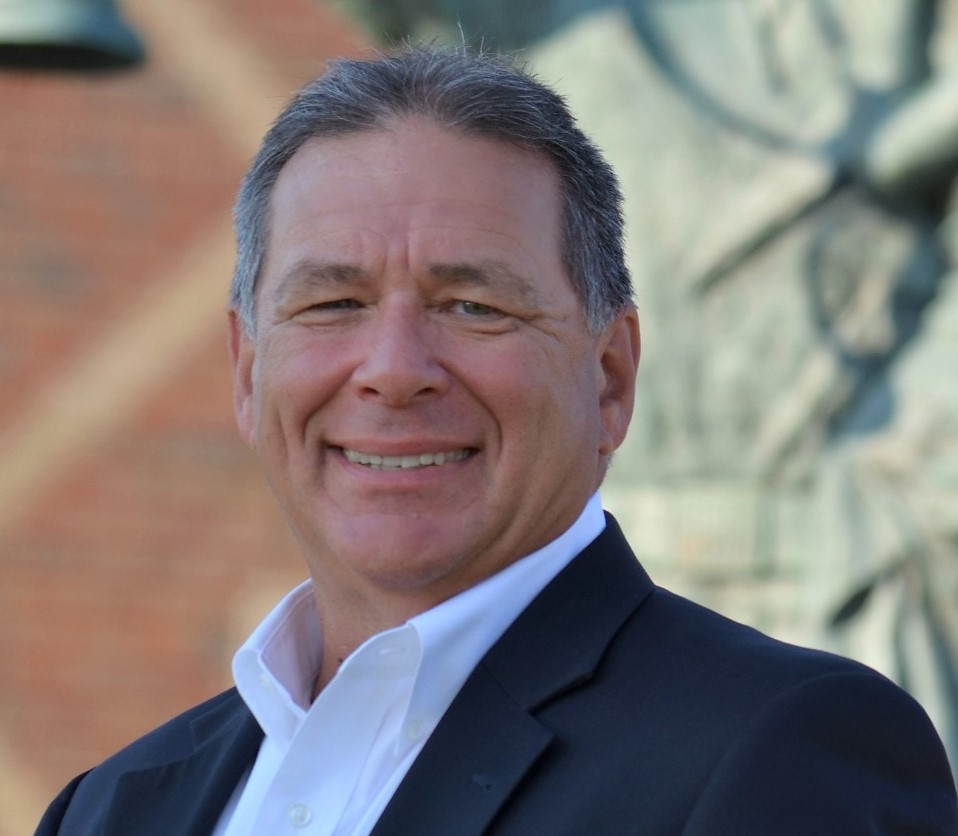

Member of the Michigan House of Representatives from the 25th district
- In office January 1, 2013 – January 1, 2019
- Preceded by: Jon Switalski
- Succeeded by: Nate Shannon

Personal details
- Born: August 28, 1957 (age 69) Madison Heights, Michigan, U.S.
- Party: Democratic
- Spouse: Jane Yanez
- Children: 4
- Education: Oakland Community College (AS)
- Website: Council website Campaign website

Henry Yanez (born August 28, 1957) is an American politician who served as a member of the Michigan House of Representatives for the 25th district from 2013 to 2019.

== Early life and education ==
Yanez was raised in Madison Heights, Michigan. He earned an Associate of Science degree in fire science and fire-fighting from Oakland Community College.

== Career ==
Yanez worked in Sterling Heights as a firefighter and paramedic before his election to the state house. He previously ran unsuccessfully for the United States House of Representatives against Candice Miller in 2010.

Following his term limited time in the Michigan House of Representatives, Yanez was appointed to the Sterling Heights City Council to fill a vacant seat on January 15, 2019, by Mayor Mike Taylor. Yanez then ran in the 2019 general election and was elected to the seat for the full, two-year term.

== Personal life ==
Yanez lives in Sterling Heights.
