= Mike Bishop (Michigan politician) =

American politician (born 1967)

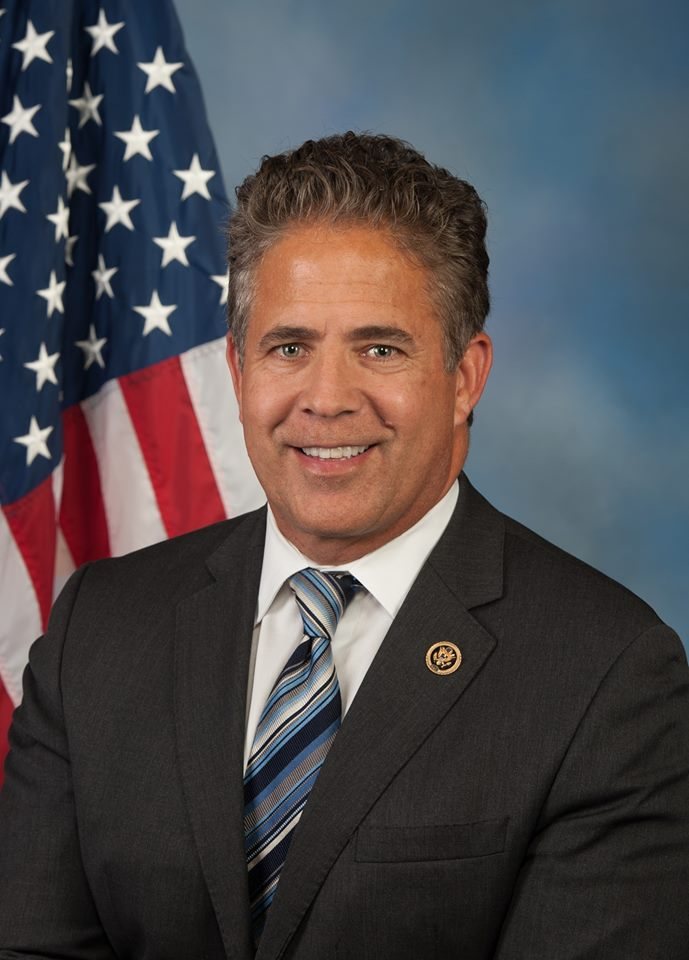
- Official portrait, 2015

Member of the U.S. House of Representatives from Michigan's 8th district
- In office January 3, 2015 – January 3, 2019
- Preceded by: Mike Rogers
- Succeeded by: Elissa Slotkin

Majority Leader of the Michigan Senate
- In office January 10, 2007 – January 12, 2011
- Preceded by: Ken Sikkema
- Succeeded by: Randy Richardville

Member of the Michigan Senate from the 12th district
- In office January 8, 2003 – January 12, 2011
- Preceded by: Alan Sanborn
- Succeeded by: Jim Marleau

Member of the Michigan House of Representatives from the 45th district
- In office January 13, 1999 – January 8, 2003
- Preceded by: Penny Crissman
- Succeeded by: John Garfield

Personal details
- Born: Michael Dean Bishop; March 18, 1967 (age 59) Almont, Michigan, U.S.
- Party: Republican
- Spouse: Cristina Bishop
- Children: 3
- Education: University of Michigan (BA); Michigan State University (JD)
- Website: Official website

Michael Dean Bishop (born March 18, 1967) is an American attorney and politician who was the U.S. representative for Michigan's 8th congressional district from 2015 to 2019. He is a member of the Republican Party. He previously served in the Michigan House of Representatives from 1999 to 2003, and the Michigan State Senate from 2003 to 2010 where he served as majority leader.

Bishop lost his reelection bid in the 2018 midterm elections to Democratic nominee and future U.S. Senator Elissa Slotkin.

== Early life, education, and career ==
Bishop graduated from Rochester Adams High School, and graduated from University of Michigan in 1989. He received a J.D. from Michigan State University College of Law. Bishop worked at the law firm of Booth Patterson until 2002. He later became a senior attorney at Simon, Galasso & Frantz. Bishop is also a licensed real estate broker and has owned two local real estate businesses, Freedom Realty, Inc. and Pro Management, Inc. Bishop is a member of the American Bar Association, State Bar of Michigan, District of Columbia Bar, Bar of the Supreme Court of the United States, Oakland County Bar Association, Michigan Association of Realtors, and National Association of Realtors.

Bishop served on the Municipal Law and Business Law committees of the Oakland County Bar Association and is a member of the National Association of Sportsmen Legislators. Following his time in the Michigan Legislature, Bishop worked as chief legal officer for International Bancard Corporation and taught at Thomas M. Cooley Law School. Prior to his election in the 45th District, Bishop unsuccessfully campaigned for a University of Michigan Board of Regents position in 1996.

== Michigan legislature ==
=== Michigan House of Representatives ===
Bishop served in the Michigan State House from 1999 to 2002 representing the 45th District, which covered much of the same territory where his father, Donald Bishop, had served. During his four-year tenure in the Michigan House, he served as vice chairman of the Commerce Committee.

=== Michigan Senate ===
Bishop was elected to the State Senate in 2002 to represent the 12th district, a seat which had previously been held by his father. He served until term limits prevented him from seeking re-election in 2010. Before his time as majority leader, Bishop was chosen to be chairman of the Banking and Financial Institutions Committee and vice chairman of both the Gaming and Casino Oversight Committee and Judiciary Committee.

==== Majority Leader ====
Bishop was the Senate Majority Leader from 2007-2010.

At the State Republican Party Convention in 2010, Bishop unsuccessfully bid for the Republican nomination for state attorney general. He ran for Oakland County prosecutor in 2012, but lost to Democratic incumbent Jessica R. Cooper.

== U.S. House of Representatives ==
=== Elections ===
==== 2014 ====
On November 4, 2014, Bishop defeated Democratic challenger Eric Schertzing for Michigan's 8th congressional district.

Bishop was sworn in on January 6, 2015. Shortly after being sworn in, he voted for John Boehner as Speaker.

==== 2016 ====
Bishop successfully ran for re-election in 2016. He ran unopposed in the Republican primary. Two Democrats, actress Melissa Gilbert and Linda Keefe, filed to run in the Democratic primary election. Gilbert later withdrew. Gilbert was replaced with Democratic challenger Suzanna Shkreli late in the race in July, 2016.

==== 2018 ====
Bishop ran for re-election but lost to Democratic challenger Elissa Slotkin.

=== Committee assignments ===
- Committee on Education and the Workforce
  - Subcommittee on Early Childhood, Elementary and Secondary EducationSubcommittee on Workforce Protections
- Committee on the Judiciary
  - Subcommittee on Crime, Terrorism, Homeland Security and Investigations
  - Subcommittee on Regulatory Reform, Commercial and Antitrust Law
- Committee on Ways and Means
  - Subcommittee on Oversight
  - Subcommittee on Human Resources

=== Caucus memberships ===
- Republican Study Committee
- House Baltic Caucus
- Congressional NextGen 9-1-1 Caucus

== Political positions ==
=== Abortion ===
Bishop has voted to ban abortions after 20 weeks and has co-sponsored legislation which states that life starts at conception.

=== Affordable Care Act ===
Bishop disapproves of the ACA and voted to repeal the Affordable Care Act in 2016.

=== Animal testing ===
Bishop has called on the USDA to stop the killing of kittens after being tested on for research.

=== Gun policy ===
Bishop supports gun rights and the Second Amendment, receiving a A/A+ rating from the NRA Political Victory Fund.

== Gordie Howe International Bridge ==
When Bishop was Majority Leader of the Michigan Senate, a bill to create the Gordie Howe International Bridge as a companion to the Ambassador Bridge came to him for determination to put it to the Senate floor for a vote. Corporate interests were strongly in favor of the bill, which would partner with Canada to pay for the bridge. Bishop opposed the bridge and did not bring the legislation to a floor vote, saying there were "too many outstanding legal issues and the legislation is too important to push a lame-duck vote." Bishop had received campaign donations from Manuel Moroun, owner of the rival Ambassador Bridge. Governor Rick Snyder, a Republican, found another way to make the deal and the project continued without Bishop's support.

Before being elected to the U.S. House of Representatives he vowed to vote to block the Gordie Howe International bridge. The Livingston Daily reported "A proposal for the federal government to fund a U.S. customs center has stalled. If elected, Bishop said he wouldn't support federal funding of the customs center."

== Personal life ==
Bishop, a resident of Rochester, Michigan, is married and has three children. He is a Congregationalist.

Michigan Senate
| Preceded by Ken Sikkema | Majority Leader of the Michigan Senate; 2007–2011 | Succeeded by Randy Richardville |
U.S. House of Representatives
| Preceded by Mike Rogers | Member of the U.S. House of Representatives from Michigan's 8th congressional district 2015–2019 | Succeeded by Elissa Slotkin |
U.S. order of precedence (ceremonial)
| Preceded by David Stockman as Former U.S. Representative | Order of precedence of the United States as Former U.S. Representative | Succeeded by Dave Trott as Former U.S. Representative |
