= John P. Garfield =

American politician

Member of the Michigan House of Representatives from the 45th district
- In office January 8, 2003 – December 31, 2008
- Preceded by: Mike Bishop
- Succeeded by: Tom McMillin

Personal details
- Born: October 6, 1949 (age 77)
- Party: Republican
- Education: University of Maryland

John P. Garfield (born October 6, 1949) is a former member of the Michigan House of Representatives.

== Early life and education ==
Garfield was born on October 6, 1949. Garfield attended the University of Maryland.

== Career ==
Garfield worked as a carpenter and an electrical estimator. Garfield served on the Oakland County Board of Commissioners. On November 5, 2002, Garfield was elected to the Michigan House of Representatives where he represented the 45th district from January 8, 2003 to December 31, 2008. During his time in the legislature, Garfield resided in Rochester Hills, Michigan.

== Personal life ==
In September 2005, Garfield was arrested for drunk driving. In the Oakland County 52-4 District Court in Troy, Michigan, Garfield entered a guilty plea, and entered himself into rehabilitation for alcoholism and pain medication misuse.
