= Lori Stone =

American politician (born 1980)

9th Mayor of Warren, Michigan
- Incumbent
- Assumed office November 20, 2023
- Preceded by: James R. Fouts

Member of the Michigan House of Representatives
- In office January 1, 2019 – November 19, 2023
- Preceded by: Patrick Green
- Succeeded by: Mai Xiong
- Constituency: 28th district (2019–2023); 13th district (2023)

Personal details
- Born: January 3, 1980 (age 46) Warren, Michigan, U.S.
- Party: Democratic
- Education: Michigan State University
- Occupation: Teacher, politician

Lori M. Stone (born January 3, 1980) is an American politician and teacher currently serving as the mayor of Warren, Michigan. Stone previously served as a Democratic member of the Michigan House of Representatives who represented District 13 (previously numbered as District 28 until 2023).

== Early life ==
Lori M. Stone was one of 4 siblings born to Thomas and Marie Stone in Warren, Michigan. Lori Stone's father, Thomas Stone, worked as a machine operator, while her mother, Marie Stone, worked as a local elementary school teacher. Marie Stone died when Lori Stone was 16. Lori M. Stone graduated from Fitzgerald High School, later going to Michigan State University and earning two bachelor's degrees in Political Theory & Constitutional Democracy and Elementary Education from 1998 to 2002. After this, she continued her education at Michigan State University, earning a master's degree in Science Education in 2008.

Stone worked in Fitzgerald Public Schools as an elementary school teacher and was active within Mound Park Elementary for 14 years. In 2017, Stone returned to Michigan State University and participated in the Michigan Political Leadership Program (MPLP), a bi-partisan program dedicated to preparing individuals for leadership and public office.

Stone also completed the Emerge Michigan Women's Boot Camp, a training program dedicated to aiding women in the Democratic Party who are planning to run for office.

== Community engagement ==
Stone has been involved in community engagement and leadership. Stone was a teacher at Mound Park Elementary School in the Fitzgerald Public Schools District in Macomb County, Michigan. Stone has fourteen years of experience in the classroom as a teacher. Stone is a member of Michigan Education Association (MEA). She volunteered for 13 years with the American Cancer Society's Relay for Life of Warren and actively supported the Warren Center Line Prevention Coalition. Since 2019, she has served as president of the Warren Symphony Society. Stone is also a member of the Warren Civic Theater, and the Fitzgerald Education Association.

On the broader scale, she has contributed to statewide efforts as a member of the Legislative Education Caucus and the Student Recovery Advisory Council of Michigan.

== Michigan House of Representatives ==
In 2016, there was a special election called for the Michigan House of Representatives after state representative for District 28, Democrat Derek Miller, was appointed as Macomb County treasurer. Stone ran to fill the seat and was defeated in the August 2016 primary by Democrat Patrick Green, only garnering 30.71% of the votes. Patrick Green ended up winning the seat.

Stone went on to run again for the same seat in 2018 and defeated incumbent Patrick Green in August 2018 in the primary. She then defeated opponents Aaron Delikta and Ryan Manier in the November 2018 general election. Stone had 62.97% of the votes.

During the 2019-2020 legislative session, Stone was a member of several committees: the Education Committee, Financial Services Committee, and Health Policy Committee.

In 2020, Stone ran for reelection and defeated her Republican opponent Stephen Colegio in the general election with 60.3% of the vote. During her 2021–2022 term, she served again on the Education and Health Policy Committees, along with the Insurance Committee.

In 2022, Stone ran for a seat in Michigan's District 13. She defeated Republican opponent Ronald A. Singer in the general election with 67.4% of the vote. During her 2023–2024 term, Stone served on the Education Committee, the House Agriculture Committee, the Financial Services Committee, and the Military, Veterans and Homeland Security Committee. However, Stone did not serve her full 2023–2024 term as she was sworn in as the mayor of Warren before she could complete it.

During her time as a state representative, Stone sponsored 25 bills. In addition to her service in the Michigan House of Representatives, Stone was a pledged delegate for Joe Biden at the 2020 Michigan Democratic presidential primary.

== Mayor of Warren ==
Following her exit from the House of Representatives, Stone was elected Mayor of Warren, Michigan in November 2023, becoming the first female Mayor of Warren. Stone received 53% of the vote. Her opponent was Human Resources Manager, George Dimas.

=== Appointments ===
Stone began her term as mayor by introducing 12 appointees to her administration in January 2024. Many of these appointments were re-appointments. The appointments to building and grounds superintendent, city controller, assistant city controller, benefits administrator, city engineer, communications director, wastewater specialist, and police captain of the Patrol Services Bureau had served a previous term. Her new appointments included her chief of staff, administrative coordinator, deputy police commissioner, and community outreach director. The appointments were unanimously approved by the city council.

In late June 2024, she announced the appointment of four members to the city's Downtown Development Authority. The city council rejected these appointments. In September 2024, Stone announced a new appointment to the Warren Police Commissioner.

=== Budget ===
In April 2024, Stone proposed a new budget for the city's fiscal year, which began in July 2024. The budget was $349.9 million and included a 7.5% increase in the city's water and sewer rate. The city council made some amendments to the budget, including removing the city's local "Newsbeat" magazine, cutting the part-time employee budget for the communications department, rejecting the budget's proposal for an increased human resources director salary, a proposal for a contractual city project manager position, and a proposal for a captain to the police department. After making these changes, the city council approved the budget.

=== Other initiatives as mayor ===
Stone addressed current projects as she continued her time in office in her first State of the City address on October 10, 2024. Among her plans is one to work with MyHealth to install an Urgent Care in Vandyke Corridor. The Michigan Economic Development Corporation offered $1.8 million for the Urgent Care

Stone also plans to implement a climate action plan and tree ordinance. Stone invited Warren residents to assist in this effort through planting trees. The city provided 200 saplings to residents to commemorate Earth Day and Arbor Day.

== Personal life ==
Stone is a resident of Warren, Michigan.

== See also ==
- 2018 Michigan House of Representatives election
