= Frank Liberati =

American politician

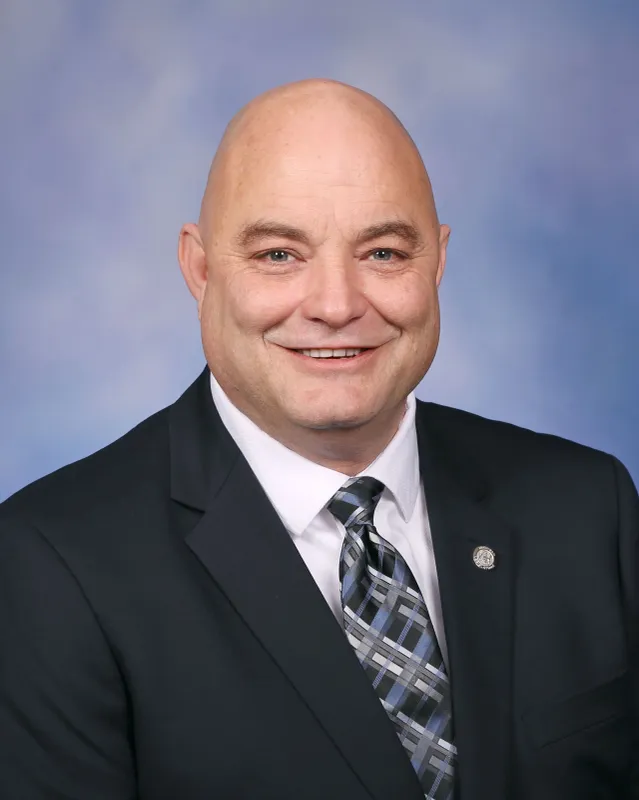

Member of the Michigan House of Representatives from the 13th district
- In office January 1, 2015 – January 1, 2021
- Preceded by: Andrew Kandrevas
- Succeeded by: Tullio Liberati

Personal details
- Born: February 7, 1964 (age 62) Allen Park, Michigan
- Party: Democratic
- Spouse: Nina
- Relations: Tullio Liberati (brother)
- Education: Michigan State University
- Website: Official website

Frank A. Liberati (born February 7, 1964) is a Democratic politician from Michigan who formerly represented the 13th District – which comprised the cities of Allen Park and Southgate, and part of Dearborn Heights – in the Michigan House of Representatives after being elected in November 2014.

He was a candidate for the newly-drawn Michigan 1st Senate district race in 2022.

== Early life and education ==
Liberati was born in Allen Park, Michigan. At the age of 16, Liberati joined the United Food and Commercial Workers Union and began working at a Farmer Jack supermarket. After graduating from Allen Park High School, Liberati attended Michigan State University. Liberati spent time as a marketing manager, before opening up Liberati's Italian Deli in Allen Park.

== Political career ==
Liberati began his political career in 2004 when he joined the Allen Park school board, and was its president from 2006-2012.

In 2014, Liberati ran for Michigan 13th House district. Liberati defeated Republican challenger Harry Sawicki with 61% of the vote. Liberati would defeat Annie Spencer in 2016 and 2018 with 60.76% and 62.75% of the vote.

Due to term limits, Liberati was unable to seek re-election to the Michigan House of Representatives in 2020. In 2022, he ran for the Michigan State Senate in the 1st district. Liberati competed in the Democratic primary but was defeated by incumbent state senator Erika Geiss, who won approximately 32% of the vote in a multi-candidate field.

In 2026, Liberati announced his candidacy for the Michigan House of Representatives in the 2nd district. He soon filed a legal complaint attempting to get his primary opponent, transgender woman Joanna Whaley, disqualified from the race under Michigan campaign law for not running under her deadname. The complaint was dismissed, and he was subsequently defeated by Whaley in the Democratic primary.

== Electoral history ==
Michigan's 13th District Representative in State Legislature Election, 2014
Party	Candidate	Votes	%
Democratic	Frank Liberati	15,283	61.02%
Republican	Harry Sawicki	9,762	38.98%
Total		25,045	100%

Michigan's 13th District Representative in State Legislature Election, 2016
Party	Candidate	Votes	%
Democratic	Frank Liberati	23,744	60.76%
Republican	Annie L. Spencer	15,336	39.24%
Total		39,080	100%

Michigan's 13th District Representative in State Legislature Election, 2018
Party	Candidate	Votes	%
Democratic	Frank Liberati	21,538	62.75%
Republican	Annie Spencer	12,783	37.25%
Total		34,321	100%
