= Penny Crissman =

American politician (born 1943)

Member of the Michigan House of Representatives from the 45th district
- In office January 1, 1993 – December 31, 1998
- Succeeded by: Mike Bishop

Personal details
- Born: November 20, 1943 (age 82) Rochester, Michigan
- Party: Republican

Penny Crissman (born November 20, 1943) is an American politician who served in the Michigan House of Representatives from the 45th district from 1993 to 1998.
