= Michigan's 16th House of Representatives district =

American legislative district

Michigan's 16th State House of Representatives district
Representative
Stephanie Young; D–Detroit
- Demographics: 35.5% White; 55.6% Black; 3.4% Hispanic; 0.6% Asian; 0.1% Native American; 0.7% Other; 4.2% Multiracial
- Population (2024): 91,631

Michigan's 16th House of Representatives district is a legislative district within the Michigan House of Representatives located in Wayne County. The district was created in 1965, when the Michigan Supreme Court ordered the reapportionment of state legislative districts from a county-based system to a proportional one following the Supreme Court case Reynolds v. Sims. It is currently represented by Democrat Stephanie Young of Detroit.

== List of representatives ==
Representative	Party	Years	Residence	Notes
Josephine Drivinsky Hunsinger	Democratic	1965–1972	Detroit	Reapportioned from the former Wayne County, 12th district; redistricted to the 1st district.
Matthew McNeely	Democratic	1973–1982	Detroit	Redistricted from the 26th district; redistricted to the 3rd district.
Juanita Watkins	Democratic	1983–1990	Detroit	Redistricted from the 20th district.
Hansen Clarke	Democratic	1991–1992	Detroit	
Richard Arthur Young	Democratic	1993–1994	Dearborn Heights	Redistricted from the 32nd district.
James Rogers Ryan	Republican	1995–1996	Redford Township	
Bob Brown	Democratic	1997–2002	Dearborn Heights	Term limited.
Jim A. Plakas	Democratic	2003–2006	Garden City	Redistricted from the 17th district.
Bob Constan	Democratic	2007–2012	Dearborn Heights	Term limited.
Robert L. Kosowski	Democratic	2013–2018	Westland	Term limited.
Kevin Coleman	Democratic	2019–2022	Westland	Redistricted to the 25th district.
Stephanie Young	Democratic	2023–present	Detroit	Redistricted from the 8th district.

== Historical district boundaries ==
Map	Description	Apportionment Plan	Notes
	Wayne County (part): Detroit (part)	1964 Apportionment Plan (Note: Referred to as the Austin-Kleiner plan.)	
	Wayne County (part): Detroit (part); Ecorse; River Rouge	1972 Apportionment Plan (Note: Referred to as the Hatcher-Kleiner plan.)	
	Wayne County (part): Detroit (part)	1982 Apportionment Plan	
	Wayne County (part): Dearborn Heights; Redford Township (part)	1992 Apportionment Plan	
	Wayne County (part): Allen Park (part); Dearborn Heights (part); Garden City; Inkster	2001 Apportionment Plan	
	Wayne County (part): Wayne; Westland (part)	2011 Apportionment Plan	
	Wayne County (part): Detroit (part); Livonia (part); Redford Township (part)	2021 Apportionment Plan (Note: Referred to as the Hickory plan.)	
	Wayne County (part): Detroit (part); Livonia (part); Redford Township (part)	Remedial 2021 Apportionment Plan Approved in 2024 (Note: Referred to as the Motown Sound FC E1 plan.)	

== Recent elections ==
=== 2020s ===
2026 Michigan House of Representatives election
Party	Candidate	Votes	%
Democratic	Stephanie A. Young (incumbent)	33,551	80.1
Republican	Brian M. Duggan	8,333	19.9
Total votes		41,884	100
Democratic hold			

2024 Michigan House of Representatives election
Party	Candidate	Votes	%
Democratic	Stephanie A. Young (incumbent)	35,682	73.52
Republican	Brian M. Duggan	10,803	22.26
Working Class	Linda Green-Harris	2,050	4.22
Total votes		48,535	100
Democratic hold			

2022 Michigan House of Representatives election
Party	Candidate	Votes	%
Democratic	Stephanie A. Young	29,550	77.92
Republican	Keith Jones	8,372	22.08
Total votes		37,922	100
Democratic hold			

2020 Michigan House of Representatives election
Party	Candidate	Votes	%
Democratic	Kevin Coleman (incumbent)	28,225	62.5
Republican	Emily Bauman	16,937	37.5
Total votes		45,162	100
Democratic hold			

=== 2010s ===
2018 Michigan House of Representatives election
Party	Candidate	Votes	%
Democratic	Kevin Coleman	22,028	67.25
Republican	Jody Rice-White	10,728	32.75
Total votes		32,756	100
Democratic hold			

2016 Michigan House of Representatives election
Party	Candidate	Votes	%
Democratic	Robert L. Kosowski (incumbent)	24,147	63.97
Republican	Matthew Morrow	13,599	36.03
Total votes		37,746	100
Democratic hold			

2014 Michigan House of Representatives election
Party	Candidate	Votes	%
Democratic	Robert L. Kosowski (incumbent)	15,346	68.19
Republican	Steve Boron	7,160	31.81
Total votes		22,506	100
Democratic hold			

2012 Michigan House of Representatives election
Party	Candidate	Votes	%
Democratic	Robert L. Kosowski	25,147	67.65
Republican	Mary Stargell	10,277	27.65
Libertarian	Steve Boron	1,039	2.8
U.S. Taxpayers'	Harold H. Dunn	710	1.91
Total votes		37,173	100
Democratic hold			

2010 Michigan House of Representatives election
Party	Candidate	Votes	%
Democratic	Bob Constan (incumbent)	14,715	67.3
Republican	Michael E. Mullins	7,151	32.7
Total votes		21,866	100
Democratic hold			

=== 2000s ===
2008 Michigan House of Representatives election
Party	Candidate	Votes	%
Democratic	Bob Constan (incumbent)	28,195	75.53
Republican	Joseph M. Smith	9,133	24.47
Total votes		37,328	100
Democratic hold			

2006 Michigan House of Representatives election
Party	Candidate	Votes	%
Democratic	Bob Constan	19,346	73.42
Republican	Jeremy A. DeLozier	7,002	26.58
Total votes		26,348	100
Democratic hold			

2004 Michigan House of Representatives election
Party	Candidate	Votes	%
Democratic	Jim A. Plakas (incumbent)	25,756	70.29
Republican	Jeffrey Lauster	9,259	25.27
Libertarian	David Nagy	886	2.42
U.S. Taxpayers'	William Lowry	740	2.02
Total votes		36,641	100
Democratic hold			

2002 Michigan House of Representatives election
Party	Candidate	Votes	%
Democratic	Jim A. Plakas	19,693	75.16
Republican	Eric E. Homeier	5,595	21.35
Libertarian	David Nagy	913	3.48
Total votes		26,201	100
Democratic hold			

2000 Michigan House of Representatives election
Party	Candidate	Votes	%
Democratic	Bob Brown (incumbent)	23,487	67.14
Republican	Colleen M. Wing	10,364	29.62
Libertarian	Chris Gonzalez	1,133	3.24
Total votes		34,984	100
Democratic hold			

=== 1990s ===
1998 Michigan House of Representatives election
Party	Candidate	Votes	%
Democratic	Bob Brown (incumbent)	17,059	59.14
Republican	Lyle C. Van Houten	11,084	38.42
Libertarian	Kerry Smith	704	2.44
Total votes		28,847	100
Democratic hold			
