= Sylvia Grot =

American politician

Member-elect of the Michigan House of Representatives from the 59th district
- Assuming office January 1, 2027
- Succeeding: Doug Wozniak

Macomb County Commissioner from the 3rd district
- Incumbent
- Assumed office January 1, 2023
- Preceded by: Veronica Klinefelt (redistricted)

Personal details
- Party: Republican
- Website: Campaign website

Sylvia Grot is an American politician who is the member-elect for the 59th district of the Michigan House of Representatives. She was elected at the 2026 election. The district was an open seat that Doug Wozniak was retiring from. She was a member of Macomb County Board of Commissioners. Her husband, Stanley Grot, is the Shelby Township clerk.
