= Tim Greimel =

American politician

Mayor of Pontiac
- In office January 2022 – January 2026
- Preceded by: Deirdre Waterman
- Succeeded by: Mike McGuinness

Minority Leader of the Michigan House of Representatives
- In office January 9, 2013 – January 1, 2017
- Preceded by: Richard Hammel
- Succeeded by: Sam Singh

Member of the Michigan House of Representatives from the 29th district
- In office March 6, 2012 – January 1, 2019
- Preceded by: Tim W. Melton
- Succeeded by: Brenda Carter

Personal details
- Born: 1973 or 1974 (age 52–53) Oakland County, Michigan, U.S.
- Party: Democratic
- Education: University of Michigan (BA, MPP, JD)

Tim Greimel (born 1973/1974) is an American politician who served as the mayor of Pontiac, Michigan, from 2022 to 2026. He is a member of the Democratic Party. Greimel was previously a member of the Michigan House of Representatives, to which he was first elected in a special election in 2012 following the resignation of Tim W. Melton. After Greimel's election to a full term in 2012, his colleagues elected him to serve as the House's minority leader.

In 2018, Greimel ran for the United States House of Representatives to represent Michigan's 11th congressional district, but lost the Democratic primary to Haley Stevens.

Greimel was elected mayor of Pontiac in 2021 with 61.66% of the vote.

Greimel ran in the 2026 election to replace the U.S. House seat held by Republican John James, who was not seeking re-election to run for governor. Greimel was defeated in the primary.

== Education and background ==
Greimel attended the University of Michigan, from which he received his bachelor's degree in economics and political science, a master's degree in public policy, and juris doctor degree. Greimel was admitted into the State Bar of Michigan on November 15, 2000.

== Local government ==
In May 2005, Greimel was elected to serve on the Rochester Community School District Board of Education. He received 7,817 votes, the second-largest number of votes behind Michelle J. Shepherd, who received 7,989 votes. During his time on the school board, Greimel briefly served as president of the board. In August 2008, and again in 2010, Greimel was elected as County Commissioner of the 11th district.

== Michigan House of Representatives (2011–2019) ==
At the end of 2011, Greimel won a special election for District 29 in the Michigan House of Representatives. Following the special election, Greimel won the election for a full term in 2012.

At the start of the full term in 2013, his House Democratic colleagues elected him to serve as the House's minority leader. He remained the Democratic leader of the House until 2017.

== 2018 congressional campaign ==
In October 2017, Greimel announced his candidacy for the United States House of Representatives to represent Michigan's 11th congressional district. He lost the Democratic primary to Haley Stevens by 4,636 votes.

== Mayor of Pontiac (2022–2026) ==
In November 2021, Greimel was elected mayor of Pontiac, Michigan, with 61.66% of the vote.

Incumbent two-term mayor Deirdre Waterman had been removed from the ballot ahead of the nonpartisan primary, after being found to have failed to file campaign finance reports in a timely manner and have failed to pay fees for late-filings. She ran a write-in campaign in the primary, but failed to receive enough votes to make the general election ballot. Griemel and Alexandra T. Riley (the city's former chief development officer, and a sales director for the Genessee County Land Bank Authority) advanced to the general election ballot.

Note was made that, in Greimel's win, voters in the city's black-majority populace electing a white mayor against a black opponent. At the time of the election, Pontiac had a populace that is approximately 60% African American, 20% non-hispanic white, and 20% hispanic. Griemel is white while his opponent was black. Detroit Free Press observed,

Greimel's election, in which a white male defeated a Black female in a majority Black city, can be seen as a testament to Greimel's ability to connect with African Americans almost as effectively as did Detroit Mayor Mike Duggan in Duggan's landslide reelection victory.

Greimel delivered his first state of the city address for Pontiac on September 29, 2022.

During his mayoralty, Greimel worked with Oakland County officials to redevelop Pontiac's downtown area and increase foot traffic. Greimel planned to demolish the Phoenix Center and replace it with a recreational space that would serve as a city center. Greimel described the Phoenix Center as a "dilapidated eyesore of a derelict parking structure".

Oakland County purchased two buildings to be used as office space in downtown Pontiac. Greimel expected the increased foot traffic from county employees and the new city center would boost economic activity in Pontiac's downtown area. The redevelopment project was expected to cost around $120–130 million, most of which would come from the state, Oakland County, and the American Rescue Plan Act.

== 2026 congressional campaign ==
In 2025, Greimel announced that he was running to fill the U.S. House seat currently held by Republican John James, who is not seeking re-election. Greimel was defeated in the primary by Christina Hines, who went on to win the seat.

Michigan House of Representatives
Preceded by Richard Hammel	Minority Leader of the Michigan House of Representatives; 2013–2017	Succeeded by Sam Singh
