= Dennis Dutko =

American politician

Member of the Michigan House of Representatives from the 25th district
- In office January 1, 1975 – October 1989
- Preceded by: Warren O'Brien
- Succeeded by: D. Roman Kulchitsky

Personal details
- Born: August 31, 1943 Detroit
- Died: January 17, 1990 (aged 46)

Dennis Dutko (1943–1990) was a member of the Michigan House of Representatives from 1974–1989. He was arrested on drunk driving charges four times while in office, the first time was in 1979. In 1989, he was sent to jail for seven months and resigned from the state House. In January 1990, he was arrested in Tennessee on charges of drug possession and driving without a licence. He committed suicide five days later at a Florida condominium.

== Sources ==
- Detroit Free Press, August 2, 2009, p. 6A
