= Michael Webber (politician) =

American politician (born 1978)

Member of the Michigan Senate from the 9th district
- Incumbent
- Assumed office January 1, 2023
- Preceded by: Paul Wojno
- Succeeded by: Theresa Brooks (elect)

Member of the Michigan House of Representatives from the 45th district
- In office January 1, 2015 – December 31, 2020
- Preceded by: Tom McMillin
- Succeeded by: Mark Tisdel

Personal details
- Born: March 7, 1978 (age 48) Santa Monica, California, U.S.
- Party: Republican
- Spouse: Julia
- Children: 1
- Education: James Madison College
- Occupation: insurance agent, politician
- Website: Webber for State Rep

Michael J. Webber (born March 7, 1978) is a Republican member of the Michigan Senate. He previously served in the Michigan House of Representatives, where he represented the 45th district.

Outside of politics, Webber is an insurance agent and by faith Roman Catholic.

Political offices
Preceded by Tom McMillin	Michigan Representatives; 45th District; 2015–2020	Succeeded by Mark Tisdel
Preceded by Paul Wojno	Michigan Senate; 9th District; 2023–present	Succeeded by Incumbent
