= Paul Wojno =

American politician (born 1956)

Member of the Michigan Senate
- Incumbent
- Assumed office January 1, 2019
- Preceded by: Steve Bieda
- Constituency: 9th district (2019–2022); 10th district (2023– )

Member of the Michigan House of Representatives from the 28th district
- In office January 1, 1997 – 2002
- Preceded by: Lloyd F. Weeks
- Succeeded by: Lisa Wojno

Personal details
- Born: March 30, 1956 (age 70) Detroit, Michigan, U.S.
- Party: Democratic
- Spouse: Lisa Wojno
- Children: 3
- Education: Center Line High School Wayne State University
- Website: Paul Wojno

Paul J. Wojno (born March 30, 1956) is a Democratic member of the Michigan Senate since 2019, where he currently represents the 10th district.

== Early life ==
Wojno was born to parents Florence and Henry Wojno on March 30, 1956, in Detroit, Wayne County, Michigan. Later, Wojno moved to Center Line, Macomb County, Michigan.

== Personal life ==
Wojno's wife is Lisa Wojno, who is a former state representative. They have three children, Kennedy, Bradley, and Audrey. Wojno is a member of the Knights of Columbus and the American Cancer Society. Wojno is Roman Catholic.

== Political career ==
Wojno served as a member of the Michigan House of Representatives for the 28th district from 1997 to 2002. He was succeeded by his wife, Lisa. He started serving in the Michigan Senate in 2019.

Political offices
Preceded by Lloyd F. Weeks	Michigan Representatives; 28th District; 1997–2002	Succeeded by Lisa Wojno
Preceded by Steve Bieda	Michigan Senate; 9th District; 2019–2022	Succeeded by Michael Webber
Preceded by Michael D. MacDonald	Michigan Senate; 10th District; 2023–present	Succeeded by Incumbent
