= Jon Switalski =

American politician from Michigan

Member of the Michigan House of Representatives from the 28th district
- In office January 1, 2013 – January 1, 2015
- Preceded by: Lesia Liss
- Succeeded by: Derek E. Miller

Member of the Michigan House of Representatives from the 25th district
- In office January 1, 2009 – January 1, 2013
- Preceded by: Steve Bieda
- Succeeded by: Henry Yanez

Personal details
- Born: Warren, Michigan
- Party: Democratic
- Profession: Politician

Jon Switalski is a former Democratic politician from the U.S. state of Michigan. He was a member of the Michigan State House of Representatives, representing the 25th District which covers parts of Warren and Sterling Heights.

Switalski was elected to his second term in the State House in 2010. He had previously served two terms as the Macomb County Commissioner and worked as an aide to former U.S. Congressman David Bonior and was an advocate for health workers for the Service Employees International Union. Switalski is currently the Director of External Affairs for River LA, a nonprofit working on the revitalization of the Los Angeles River.

== Education ==
Switalski is a graduate of St. Clement Catholic High School and also earned a bachelor's degree in political science from Grand Valley State University.
