= Tom McMillin =

American politician

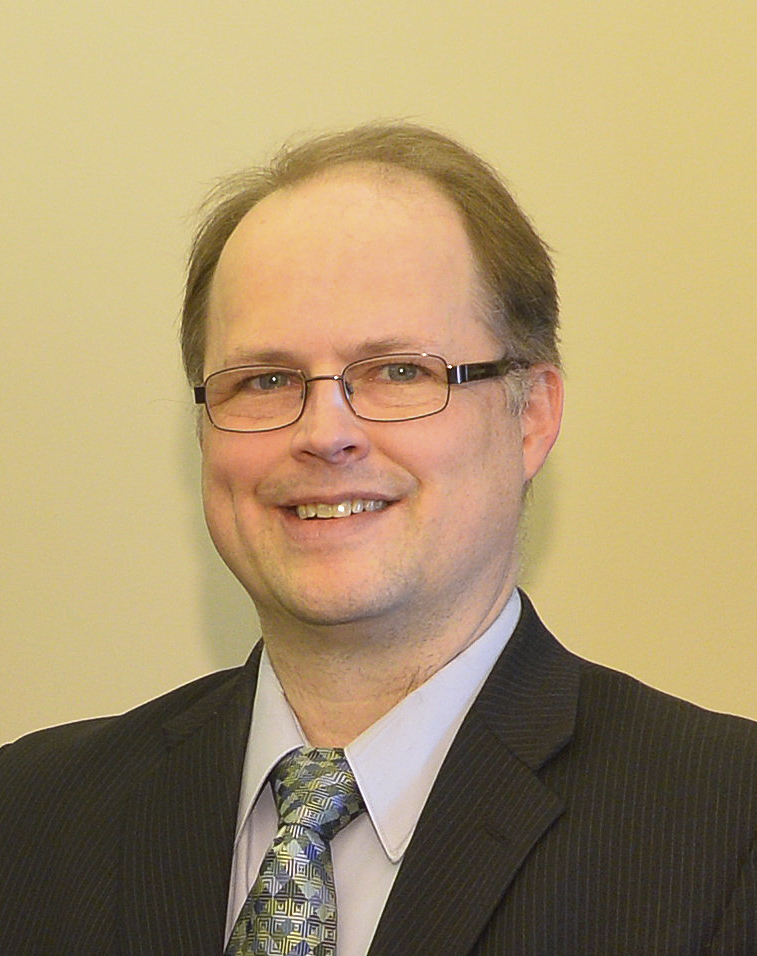

Member of the Michigan House of Representatives from the 45th district
- In office January 1, 2009 – January 1, 2015
- Preceded by: John Garfield
- Succeeded by: Michael Webber

Personal details
- Born: March 26, 1967 (age 59) Philadelphia, Pennsylvania, U.S.
- Party: Republican
- Spouse: Dalila McMillin
- Education: University of Michigan (BA)

Tom McMillin is a member of the Michigan State Board of Education, and a former member of the Michigan State House from 2009 through 2014, representing the 45th State House district centered in Rochester Hills, Michigan. He was previously mayor of Auburn Hills and a member of the Oakland County Commission. McMillin graduated from the University of Michigan in 1987 with a bachelor's degree in economics and accounting. He is a certified public accountant. In 2009, McMillin was of the most conservative politicians in Michigan, having defeated a Royal Oak gay rights ordinance and supporting a county commission resolution defining marriage as a union between a man and a woman.

McMillin was the honorary chairman of Concerned Taxpayers of Michigan, a ballot question committee opposing a proposal to raise state taxes that appeared on the May 5, 2015, ballot.

McMillin was elected chairman of the 8th Congressional District Republican Committee of Michigan on February 20, 2015.

== Sources ==
- State House bio of McMillin
- Republicans take 2 seats on state education board – article in Detroit Free Press
