= Lisa Wojno =

American politician from Michigan

Macomb County Commissioner from the 11th district
- Incumbent
- Assumed office January 1, 2025
- Preceded by: Gus Ghanam

Member of the Michigan House of Representatives from the 28th district
- In office January 8, 2003 – 2008
- Preceded by: Paul Wojno
- Succeeded by: Lesia Liss

Personal details
- Born: May 31, 1972 (age 54) Warren, Michigan
- Party: Democratic
- Spouse: Paul Wojno
- Children: 3
- Education: Oakland University

Lisa Wojno (born May 31, 1972) is a Democratic member of the Macomb County Board of Commissioners. Wojno previously served in the Michigan House of Representatives.

== Early life ==
Wojno was born on May 31, 1972 in Warren, Michigan.

== Personal life ==
Lisa Wojno is married to Paul Wojno and has three children. Wojno is Catholic.

== Political career ==
Succeeding her husband, Paul Wojno, Lisa Wojno served as a member of the Michigan House of Representatives from 2003 to 2008.

Political offices
Preceded by Paul Wojno	Michigan Representatives; 28th District; 2003–2008	Succeeded by Lesia Liss
