= Michigan's 45th House of Representatives district =

American legislative district

Michigan's 45th State House of Representatives district
Representative
| Sarah Lightner; R–Springport |
- Demographics: 90.7% White; 1.5% Black; 3.6% Hispanic; 0.6% Asian; 0.1% Native American; 0.1% Other; 3.3% Multiracial
- Population (2024): 90,499

Michigan's 45th House of Representatives district is a legislative district within the Michigan House of Representatives located in the counties of Calhoun, Jackson, and Kalamazoo. The district was created in 1965, when the Michigan Supreme Court ordered the reapportionment of state legislative districts from a county-based system to a proportional one following the Supreme Court case Reynolds v. Sims. It is currently represented by Republican Sarah Lightner of Springport.

== List of representatives ==
| Representative | Party | Years | Residence | Notes |
|---|---|---|---|---|
| Harry A. DeMaso | Republican | 1965–1966 | Battle Creek | Reapportioned from the former Calhoun County, 2nd district. |
| James H. Heinze | Republican | 1967–1972 | Battle Creek | |
| Bela E. Kennedy | Republican | 1973–1982 | Bangor | Redistricted from the 54th district. |
| James Mick Middaugh | Republican | 1983–1992 | Paw Paw | Redistricted to the 80th district. |
| Penny M. Crissman | Republican | 1993–1998 | Rochester | Term limited. |
| Michael D. Bishop | Republican | 1999–2002 | Rochester | |
| John P. Garfield | Republican | 2003–2008 | Rochester Hills | Term limited. |
| Tom E. McMillin | Republican | 2009–2014 | Rochester Hills | Term limited. |
| Michael Webber | Republican | 2015–2020 | Rochester Hills | Term limited. |
| Mark Tisdel | Republican | 2021–2022 | Rochester Hills | Redistricted to the 55th district. |
| Sarah Lightner | Republican | 2023–present | Springport | Redistricted from the 65th district. |

== Historical district boundaries ==
| Map | Description | Apportionment Plan | Notes |
|---|---|---|---|
| | Calhoun County (part): Athens Township; Battle Creek Township; LeRoy Township; Springfield; Kalamazoo County (part): Brady Township; Charleston Township (part); Climax Township; Comstock Township; Galesburg; Prairie Ronde Township; Schoolcraft Township; Texas Township; Wakeshma Township; St. Joseph County (part): Burr Oak Township; Colon Township; Fawn River Township; Leonidas Township; Lockport Township; Mendon Township; Nottawa Township; Park Township; Sherman Township | 1964 Apportionment Plan | |
| | Van Buren County (part): Excluding; Decatur Township; Hamilton Township; Keeler Township (part); Porter Township; South Haven; Allegan County (part): Cheshire Township; Gunplain Township; Lee Township; Martin Township; Otsego; Otsego Township; Plainwell; Trowbridge Township; Valley Township; Barry County (part): Orangeville Township (part); Berrien County (part): Excluding; Bainbridge Township; Baroda Township; Benton Harbor; Benton Township; Berrien Township; Bertrand Township; Bridgman; Buchanan; Buchanan Township; Chikaming Township; Galien Township; Lake Township; Lincoln Township; New Buffalo; New Buffalo Township; Niles; Niles Township; Oronoko Township; Pipestone Township; Royalton Township; Three Oaks Township; Sodus Township; St. Joseph; St. Joseph Township; Weesaw Township | 1972 Apportionment Plan | |
| | Cass County (part): Dowagiac; Pokagon Township; Silver Creek Township; Wayne Township; Van Buren County | 1982 Apportionment Plan | |
| | Oakland County (part): Addison Township; Oakland Charter Township; Orion Township; Oxford Township; Rochester; Rochester Hills (part) | 1992 Apportionment Plan | |
| | Oakland County (part): Oakland Charter Township; Rochester; Rochester Hills | 2001 Apportionment Plan | |
| | Oakland County (part): Oakland Charter Township (part); Rochester; Rochester Hills | 2011 Apportionment Plan | |
| | Calhoun County (part): Albion Township; Athens Township; Burlington Township; Clarendon Township; Eckford Township; Emmett Charter Township (part); Fredonia Township; Homer Township; Leroy Township; Marengo Township; Marshall; Marshall Township; Newton Township; Tekonsha Township; Jackson County (part): Concord Township; Hanover Township; Henrietta Township; Liberty Township; Parma Township; Pulaski Township; Rives Township; Sandstone Charter Township; Spring Arbor Township; Springport Township; Tompkins Township; Kalamazoo County (part): Charleston Township; Climax Township; Wakeshma Township | 2021 Apportionment Plan (Note: Referred to as the Hickory plan.) | |

== Recent elections ==
=== 2020s ===
2026 Michigan House of Representatives election
| Party | Candidate | Votes | % |
|---|---|---|---|
| Republican | Sarah Lightner (incumbent) | 27,588 | 65.73 |
| Democratic | Randy Davis | 14,382 | 34.27 |
| Total votes | | 41,970 | 100 |
| Republican hold | | | |

2024 Michigan House of Representatives election
| Party | Candidate | Votes | % |
|---|---|---|---|
| Republican | Sarah Lightner (incumbent) | 35,411 | 69.59 |
| Democratic | Doug Murch | 15,472 | 30.41 |
| Total votes | | 50,883 | 100 |
| Republican hold | | | |

2022 Michigan House of Representatives election
| Party | Candidate | Votes | % |
|---|---|---|---|
| Republican | Sarah Lightner | 27,506 | 67.62 |
| Democratic | Ron Hawkins | 13,170 | 32.38 |
| Total votes | | 40,676 | 100 |
| Republican hold | | | |

2020 Michigan House of Representatives election
| Party | Candidate | Votes | % |
|---|---|---|---|
| Republican | Mark Tisdel | 29,227 | 52.35 |
| Democratic | Barb Anness | 26,604 | 47.65 |
| Total votes | | 55,831 | 100 |
| Republican hold | | | |

=== 2010s ===
2018 Michigan House of Representatives election
| Party | Candidate | Votes | % |
|---|---|---|---|
| Republican | Michael Webber | 23,628 | 55.1 |
| Democratic | Kyle Cooper | 19,235 | 44.9 |
| Total votes | | 42,863 | 100 |
| Republican hold | | | |

2016 Michigan House of Representatives election
| Party | Candidate | Votes | % |
|---|---|---|---|
| Republican | Michael Webber | 29,121 | 62.1 |
| Democratic | Ted Golden | 17,792 | 37.9 |
| Total votes | | 46,913 | 100 |
| Republican hold | | | |

2014 Michigan House of Representatives election
| Party | Candidate | Votes | % |
|---|---|---|---|
| Republican | Michael Webber | 18,370 | 56.2 |
| Democratic | Joanna VanRaaphorst | 14,338 | 43.8 |
| Total votes | | 32,708 | 100 |
| Republican hold | | | |

2012 Michigan House of Representatives election
| Party | Candidate | Votes | % |
|---|---|---|---|
| Republican | Tom McMillin | 25,972 | 56.0 |
| Democratic | Joanna VanRaaphorst | 20,408 | 44.0 |
| Total votes | | 46,380 | 100 |
| Republican hold | | | |

2010 Michigan House of Representatives election
| Party | Candidate | Votes | % |
|---|---|---|---|
| Republican | Tom McMillin | 24,973 | 67.9 |
| Democratic | Mary Ward | 11,815 | 32.1 |
| Total votes | | 36,788 | 100 |
| Republican hold | | | |

2008 Michigan House of Representatives election
| Party | Candidate | Votes | % |
|---|---|---|---|
| Republican | Tom McMillin | 29,445 | 57.5 |
| Democratic | Randy Young | 21,781 | 42.5 |
| Total votes | | 51,226 | 100 |
| Republican hold | | | |
