= Lloyd F. Weeks =

American politician (1932–2002)

Member of the Michigan House of Representatives from the 28th district
- In office January 1, 1993 – 1996
- Preceded by: Robert A. DeMars
- Succeeded by: Paul Wojno

Member of the Michigan House of Representatives from the 70th district
- In office January 1, 1983 – 1992
- Preceded by: John T. Kelsey
- Succeeded by: H. Lynn Jondahl

Personal details
- Born: June 9, 1932 Cheboygan, Michigan
- Died: October 25, 2002 (aged 70)
- Party: Democratic
- Spouse: Tracy
- Children: 9
- Education: Wayne State University; Macomb Community College; God's Bible College

Lloyd "Pete" F. Weeks (June 9, 1932 – October 25, 2002) was an American politician from Michigan. Weeks was a Democratic member of Michigan House of Representatives.

== Early life ==
Weeks was born on June 9, 1932, in Cheboygan, Michigan.

== Career ==
Weeks' first elected position was to the Member Warren City Council where he served from 1977 to 1982. Weeks was first sworn in to the Michigan House of Representatives from the 70th district from 1983 to 1992. He then represented the 28th district from 1993 to 1996.

== Personal life ==
Weeks married Tracy and together they had nine children. Weeks was Presbyterian. Weeks died on October 25, 2002.
