= Bob Constan =

American politician from Michigan

Member of the Michigan House of Representatives from the 16th district
- In office 2007–2012
- Preceded by: Jim A. Plakas
- Succeeded by: Robert Kosowski

Personal details
- Born: March 1, 1959 (age 67) Detroit, Michigan
- Party: Democratic
- Spouse: Single
- Education: University of Michigan
- Profession: Attorney

Bob Constan (born March 1, 1959) is a politician from the state of Michigan. He was a member of the Michigan State House of Representatives. A Democrat, he represented the 16th district in Wayne County, and includes the portions of Dearborn Heights, Garden City, Inkster and Allen Park. He currently sits on the City Council for the City of Dearborn Heights.

== Early life ==
On March 1, 1959, Constan was born in Detroit, Michigan. Constan graduated from Annapolis High School in Dearborn Heights.

== Education ==
Constan graduated from the University of Michigan and the University of Detroit Mercy School of Law.

== Career ==
Constan practiced law as an attorney for 25 years, representing the Michigan Democratic Party on voter protection issues. He has served on the Michigan State Bar and the Dearborn Area Bar Association.

On November 7, 2006, Constan won the election and became a Democratic member of Michigan House of Representatives for district 16. Constan defeated Jeremy A. DeLozier with 73.42% of the votes.

After his term as a legislator expired, Constan returned to the private practice of law in Dearborn Heights.

Constan is the Chairman of the Dearborn Heights City Council. He also successfully ran for the Michigan House of Representatives and was elected three (3) times. He served on the Insurance, Labor, Government Operations, and Senior Health Committees.

After his term expired in 2013, Constan returned to Dearborn Heights and was again elected to the Dearborn Heights City Council. While Constan was still in the state legislature, he ran for Dearborn Heights City clerk and lost in a narrow defeat, coming in third in a field of three, thus failing to make the general election. He then ran for the Wayne County Board of Commissioners and lost to his opponent.

== Personal life ==
Constan's wife is Kim Constan. They have three children.
