= Lesia Liss =

American politician (born 1966)

Member of the Michigan House of Representatives from the 28th district
- In office 2009–2013
- Preceded by: Lisa Wojno
- Succeeded by: Jon Switalski

Personal details
- Born: Lesia Batschynsky; August 11, 1966 (age 60) Hamtramck, Michigan, U.S.
- Party: Democratic
- Spouse(s): Mark Liss, divorced
- Education: University of Michigan–Dearborn (B.A.)
- Occupation: Emergency department nurse, politician

Lesia Liss (born August 11, 1966, née Batschynsky) is an American politician from the state of Michigan. In 2008, she was elected as a Democrat to the Michigan State House of Representatives. Prior to serving in the legislature, Liss was an emergency department nurse for 22 years. She was married to former Warren City Councilman Mark Liss.

== Biography ==
Lesia Batschynsky was born on August 11, 1966, to Marta and George Batschynsky, a Ukrainian immigrant, in Hamtramck, Michigan. In 1971, Lesia, her parents, and her brother Roman Batschynsky moved to Warren, Michigan, where Lesia has lived ever since. She attended South Elementary and Butcher Junior High, both in Warren. In 1984, Batschynsky graduated from Charles S. Mott High School. She went on to receive her associate degree in Nursing from Henry Ford Community College in Detroit, Michigan in 1995. In 2007 she earned a bachelor's degree in Hispanic Studies from The University of Michigan-Dearborn. Liss worked as a Registered Emergency Room Nurse in the Henry Ford Health System.

Lesia met the man who became her now former husband, Mark Liss, in 1992, and married in August 1993. In 2007 Mark was elected to his first term to the Warren City Council. Both Lesia and Mark are of Ukrainian descent and are active in the Ukrainian Community. Liss is fluent in Ukrainian, Spanish, and English. She is Ukrainian Orthodox and attends St. Mary the Protectress Church in Southfield, Michigan.

== Political career ==
Lesia Liss was involved in supporting her then husband Mark's successful campaign for Warren City Council in 2007. The same year, she announced her intention to seek the 28th State House District, located in South-Western Macomb County and including about two-thirds of the city of Warren and all of the city of Center Line. It was being vacated by Democratic incumbent Lisa Wojno, who was barred from running for re-election because of term-limits.

Liss faced seven other Democrats in the primary. She won by a fairly large margin on election day, carrying about 31.3% of the vote. Her nearest opponent received only about 22.2%. In the general election she faced Republican Jason Balaska. The 28th District is one of the most Democratic districts in Macomb County. Democrats usually dominate in this district. Liss defeated Balaska on election day by a margin of 70.5%-29.5%.

She took office on January 1, 2009. She sat on the Family and Children Services, Health Policy, Labor, Military and Veteran Affairs and Homeland Security, and Government Operations (vice chair) Committees.

== Electoral history ==
- 2008 campaign for State House
  - Lesia Liss (D), 70%
  - Jason Balaska (R), 30%
- 2008 campaign for State House, Democratic Primary
  - Lesia Liss (D), 31%
  - Gloria Sankuer (D), 22%
  - John Vostoris (D), 17%
  - Terry Wisniewski (D), 10%
  - Marlon Brown (D), 8%
  - Roy Gillette (D), 5%
  - Paul Clark (D), 4%
  - Alan Shepperd (D), 3%
