= Peter Herzberg =

American politician from Michigan

Member of the Michigan House of Representatives from the 25th district
- Incumbent
- Assumed office April 30, 2024
- Preceded by: Kevin Coleman

Personal details
- Born: Peter Alexander Herzberg; April 23, 1991 (age 35)
- Party: Democratic
- Relatives: Kevin Coleman (cousin)
- Education: Wayne State University (BA)

Peter Herzberg is an American politician serving as a member of the Michigan House of Representatives since 2024, representing the 25th district. A member of the Democratic Party, he previously served on the Westland City Council.

== Political positions ==
In 2025, Herzberg broke party lines to vote in favor of a resolution calling for the federal ban on transgender girls in women's sports under the Trump to be enforced in the state of Michigan.

Petition language to recall Herzberg was approved July 18, 2025 per the Michigan Board of Canvassers.
