= Kevin Coleman (politician) =

American politician (born 1983)

Mayor of Westland, Michigan
- Incumbent
- Assumed office November 13, 2023
- Preceded by: Michael P. Londeau

Member of the Michigan House of Representatives
- In office January 1, 2019 – November 13, 2023
- Preceded by: Robert Kosowski
- Succeeded by: Peter Herzberg
- Constituency: 16th district (2019–2023); 25th district (2023)

Personal details
- Born: June 30, 1983 (age 43)
- Party: Democratic
- Relatives: Peter Herzberg (cousin)
- Education: Western Michigan University
- Website: Campaign website

Kevin Coleman (born June 30, 1983) is an American politician serving as the mayor of Westland, Michigan since 2023. A member of the Democratic Party, Coleman previously served in the Michigan House of Representatives from 2019 to 2023.

== Early life and education ==
Coleman was born in Redford, Michigan.

Coleman graduated from Churchill High School. Coleman earned a bachelor's degree from Western Michigan University and attended the Lee Honors College. He is a lifelong Michigan resident.

== Career ==
=== Early career ===
Coleman was a music instructor, and worked in the community on the Westland Festival Committee and the Westland Veterans Association for several years.

=== City council ===
In 2014, Coleman's political career began when he became a city councilman for Westland, Michigan.

=== State legislature ===
On November 6, 2018, Coleman was elected as a Democratic member of Michigan House of Representatives for District 16. He was re-elected to the seat in 2020. In 2022, Coleman was re-elected for his third term, this time in District 25 due to Michigan's redistricting.

=== Mayor ===
In 2023, Mayor Bill Wild of Westland resigned and City Council President Pro Tem Michael P. Londeau was appointed as a replacement. Coleman challenged Londeau in the following election and won 59% to 41%. He is currently serving as the 10th Mayor of the city.

== Personal life ==
Coleman is Catholic. He lives in Westland, Michigan. He divorced Ha Thi Bich Tran-Coleman in 2013.

== See also ==
- 2018 Michigan House of Representatives election
