= Patrick Green (politician) =

American politician from Michigan

Member of the Michigan House of Representatives from the 28th district
- In office November 22, 2016 – December 31, 2018
- Preceded by: Derek E. Miller
- Succeeded by: Lori Stone

Personal details
- Born: September 23, 1964 (age 62) Royal Oak, Michigan
- Party: Democratic
- Spouse: Pilar Ferry
- Children: 6
- Education: University of Detroit

Patrick Green (born September 23, 1964) is a former member of the Michigan House of Representatives and serves on the Warren City Council.

== Early life ==
Green was born on September 23, 1964, in Royal Oak, Michigan.

== Education ==
Green studied mathematics at the University of Detroit.

== Career ==
Green was an employee of Wells Fargo Insurance from 1996 to 2006.

Green served on the Warren city council from 2007 to 2016. On November 8, 2016, Green was elected to the Michigan House of Representatives where he represented the 28th district from November 22, 2016, to December 31, 2018. When seeking re-election, Green was defeated in the Democratic primary by Lori Stone on August 7, 2018, who would go on to be elected to the state house.

== Personal life ==
Green is married to Pilar Ferry, sharing 6 children together.
