= Brenda Carter =

American politician (born 1954)

Member of the Michigan House of Representatives
- Incumbent
- Assumed office January 1, 2019
- Preceded by: Tim Greimel
- Constituency: 29th district (2019–2022); 53rd district (2023–present)

Personal details
- Born: September 10, 1954 (age 72)
- Party: Democratic
- Spouse: Randy Carter
- Children: 5
- Education: Spring Arbor College; Michigan State University; Oakland University (BA, MPA)
- Occupation: Politician
- Website: Official website

Brenda Joyce Carter (née Canty; born September 10, 1954) is an American politician serving as a member of the Michigan House of Representatives since 2019, currently representing the 53rd district. She is a member of the Democratic Party.

== Early life ==
Carter was born on September 10, 1954. Carter's father was John H. Canty. Carter's mother was Mary S. Wallace. Carter is the fifth oldest and she has twelve siblings. Carter attended high school in Detroit, Michigan.

== Education ==
Carter attended Spring Arbor College, Michigan State University, and Oakland University.

== Career ==
Carter was an engineering analyst for GM. Carter is a former interim assistant to the City Manager of Troy, Michigan. In August 2018, Carter defeated Kermit Williams, Chris Jackson, Lone Bowman, Keyon Payton, and Mike Demand, and won the primary election for Michigan House of Representatives for District 29. On November 6, 2018, Carter won the election and became a member of Michigan House of Representatives for District 29.

Following redistricting, Carter ran in the 53rd district in 2022, winning reelection. She was reelected in 2024.

== Personal life ==
Carter's husband is Randy Carter, a councilman. They have five children. In 1998, Carter and her family moved to Pontiac, Michigan.

== See also ==
- 2018 Michigan House of Representatives election
