= James R. Fouts =

Mayor of Warren, Michigan

8th Mayor of Warren, Michigan
- In office November 9, 2007 – November 20, 2023
- Preceded by: Mark Steenbergh
- Succeeded by: Lori Stone

Personal details
- Born: August 8, 1942 (age 84) Hazel Park, Michigan, U.S.
- Party: Republican (before 1980); Democratic (1980-2015)(2024–present); Independent (2015-2023)
- Education: Central Michigan University
- Profession: Educator (retired), politician
- Website: http://www.jamesfouts.com/

James Richard Fouts (born August 8, 1942) is an American politician who served as the mayor of Warren, Michigan from 2007 to 2023.

== Personal life ==
Fouts grew up in Hazel Park, Michigan, where his father served as the city assessor, and later as city manager. Prior to election to public office, he spent his career as an educator, teaching government, political science, and psychology in the Warren Consolidated School District. His last teaching position was at Sterling Heights High School, where he taught for about ten years.

== Early political career ==
In 1976, Fouts ran as a Republican for the Michigan state house of representatives in the 70th District. Fouts was elected to the Warren City Council in 1981, where he served for 26 years as a Democrat. During his tenure, he initiated several anti-tobacco proposals.

In 2007, Mark Steenbergh had reached the term limit as mayor of Warren and did not seek re-election. Fouts ran against City Clerk Richard Sulaka for the open seat and won 62% to 38%. In the 2007 campaign, finance reports show that Sulaka outspent Fouts $332,000 to $225,000. Sulaka described Fouts as a "maverick" and attributed his victory to voters seeking an alternative to the previous administration. The election also saw Warren citizens electing a new clerk, new treasurer, and a majority of new council members.

== Mayoral tenure ==
His enforcement of local building codes led to the demolition of dilapidated buildings and the promotion of neighborhood "clean sweeps" by city inspectors and was touted as a model for other mayors.

In response to the challenges facing the automotive industry, an industry which employs many Warren residents, he initiated a "Buy American Products" policy for automotive purchases by heads of city departments.

In 2009, Fouts tried to convince General Motors to relocate its headquarters from Detroit to Warren.

His 2011 re-election campaign was endorsed by the Detroit Free Press who said the campaign had become "way too focused on legal battles over Fouts' age" which became an issue when his opponents filed suit to remove him from the ballot because he had refused to place his age on the candidacy form. He won the lawsuit and the election with more than 80% of the vote against City Councilwoman Kathy Vogt.

In 2012, he acted to ban smoking within 100 feet of any city building without legislative approval, but the court said he did not have the authority and had the "No Smoking" signs removed. Fouts brought the measure back to the city council, after they had tabled it in September.

In July 2014, Fouts personally denied permission to establish an irreligious "Reason Booth" at Warren City Hall, as a counterpoint to a "Prayer Booth" that was established in the city hall's atrium by a local Pentecostal church in 2009. The resident denied permission, Douglas Marshall, filed a federal lawsuit against both the city and Fouts. Represented by the American Civil Liberties Union, Americans United for Separation of Church and State, and Freedom From Religion Foundation, Marshall's lawsuit was based on the First Amendment rights to free speech and a violation of the Establishment Clause. The defendants failed to respond to the lawsuit, and in 2015 the federal court ordered that the reason station "be allowed to operate on terms not less favorable than the terms granted to the 'Prayer Station' currently allowed in the atrium space" and entered a $100,000 judgment against the city and Fouts for costs, damages and attorney fees.

In 2014, Fouts sued to invalidate 2014 Proposal 1, a voter-approved referendum that eliminated the Michigan personal property tax for businesses (which applies to industrial machinery and office equipment) and replaced it with an Internet sales tax. Fouts alleged that the ballot wording was biased. The Michigan Court of Claims declined to invalidate the ballot initiative, and Fouts ultimately dropped an appeal.

In March 2016, Fouts claimed that he was asked by Debbie Wasserman Schultz and security at the Democratic presidential debate in Flint to refrain from showing excessive enthusiasm for Bernie Sanders, and that he was threatened with ejection.

Fouts won a third term in November 2015, carrying 85% of the vote.

In November 2016, Fouts accused Macomb County Executive Mark Hackel of a coverup of illegal dumping. In response, Hackel provided a series of audio recordings to the media, that he claimed to have received from unidentified sources, allegedly of Fouts making derogatory comments. Fouts claimed that the recordings were manufactured and manipulated. These led to calls for Fouts's resignation. In a post on Facebook, Fouts declared his intention to remain in office through to the end of his term in 2019; he would go on to be reelected to a fourth term later that year, with 57.5% of the vote.

In late 2017, amid the heroin epidemic, Fouts and Warren Police Commissioner Jim Dwyer created a program to offer rewards to residents of the city who give confidential tips to police informing on suspected drug deals.

In April 2020, Fouts directed the Warren Police to not enforce the provision of Governor Gretchen Whitmer's executive order on COVID-19 banning commercial lawn services. Fouts stated the lack of lawn maintenance would lead to higher numbers of mosquitoes and rodents and be a health hazard and that it is an essential service.

In January 2023, Fouts filed paperwork to run for a fifth term as mayor in the November 2023 election, despite voters passing a charter amendment in 2020 establishing a three-term limit for the office of mayor. The city's election clerk approved his candidacy, and was promptly sued by the City Council. Fouts claimed to have been grandfathered in, having been elected to all four terms before the amendment passed; a Macomb County judge sided with Fouts in March. The decision was overturned by the Michigan Court of Appeals in April, and the clerk was ordered to disqualify Fouts.

=== State legislative bid ===
Fouts rejoined the Democratic Party in 2024, and that April, he filed to run in the Democratic primary for Michigan's redrawn 14th House of Representatives district, challenging incumbent Representative Mike McFall. McFall defeated Fouts, 71% to 29%.

== Elections ==
=== 2019 ===
Fouts won his re-election to the City's Mayoral office over challenger Kelly Colegio.

Warren City Mayoral Election Results, 2019
| Party | Candidate | Votes | % |
|---|---|---|---|
| N/A | James R. Fouts | 13,772 | 57.5 |
| N/A | Kelly Colegio | 10,191 | 42.5 |
| Total votes | | 24,233 | 100 |

=== 2015 ===
Fouts won his re-election to the City's Mayoral office by an extremely large margin over challenger Karen Spranger.

Warren City Mayoral Election Results, 2015
| Party | Candidate | Votes | % |
|---|---|---|---|
| N/A | James R. Fouts | 12,159 | 84.7 |
| N/A | Karen Spranger | 2,197 | 15.3 |
| Total votes | | 14,584 | 100 |

=== 2011 ===
Fouts won his re-election to the City's Mayoral office by an extremely large margin over challenger Kathy J. Vogt.

Warren City Mayoral Election Results, 2011
| Party | Candidate | Votes | % |
|---|---|---|---|
| N/A | James R. Fouts | 18,215 | 80.7 |
| N/A | Kathy J. Vogt | 4,364 | 19.3 |
| Total votes | | 22,991 | 100 |

=== 2007 ===
The Macomb Clerk's website does not have election results for Fouts' first election.
