= Michigan's 25th House of Representatives district =

American legislative district

Michigan's 25th State House of Representatives district
Representative
Peter Herzberg; D–Westland
- Demographics: 62.1% White; 22.7% Black; 3.7% Hispanic; 4.5% Asian; 0.4% Native American; 0.5% Other; 6% Multiracial
- Population (2024): 88,746

Michigan's 25th House of Representatives district is a legislative district within the Michigan House of Representatives located in Wayne County. The district was created in 1965, when the Michigan Supreme Court ordered the reapportionment of state legislative districts from a county-based system to a proportional one following the Supreme Court case Reynolds v. Sims. It is currently represented by Democrat Peter Herzberg of Westland.

== List of representatives ==
Representative	Party	Years	Residence	Notes
John J. Fitzpatrick	Democratic	1965–1966	Detroit	Reapportioned from the former Wayne County, 6th district.
Frank V. Wierzbicki	Democratic	1967–1972	Detroit	Redistricted to the 17th district.
Warren O'Brien	Republican	1973–1974	Warren	
Dennis Marcie Dutko	Democratic	1975–1989	Warren	Resigned October 1989 while serving a prison sentence for two drunk driving convictions.
D. Roman Kulchitsky	Republican	1990 (Note: Elected in a 1990 special election to replace Rep. Dennis Marcie Dutko, who resigned.)	Warren	
Dennis G. Olshove	Democratic	1991–1992	Warren	Redistricted to the 29th district.
Robert A. DeMars	Democratic	1993–1996	Lincoln Park	Redistricted from the 28th district; died June 1996.
Gloria J. Schermesser	Democratic	1996 (Note: Elected in a 1996 special election to replace Rep. Robert A. DeMars, who died.)–2002	Lincoln Park	Term limited.
Steven M. Bieda	Democratic	2003–2008	Warren	Term limited.
Jon M. Switalski	Democratic	2009–2012	Warren	Redistricted to the 28th district.
Henry Yanez	Democratic	2013–2018	Sterling Heights	Term limited.
Nate Shannon	Democratic	2019–2022	Sterling Heights	Redistricted to the 58th district.
Kevin Coleman	Democratic	2023	Westland	Redistricted from the 16th district; resigned November 2023 after being elected mayor of Westland.
Peter Herzberg	Democratic	2024 (Note: Elected in a 2024 special election to replace Rep. Kevin Coleman, who resigned.)–present	Westland	

== Historical district boundaries ==
Map	Description	Apportionment Plan	Notes
	Wayne County (part): Detroit (part)	1964 Apportionment Plan (Note: Referred to as the Austin-Kleiner plan.)	
	Macomb County (part): Warren (part)	1972 Apportionment Plan (Note: Referred to as the Hatcher-Kleiner plan.)	
	Macomb County (part): Warren (part)	1982 Apportionment Plan	
	Wayne County (part): Allen Park (part); Ecorse; Lincoln Park; Melvindale	1992 Apportionment Plan	
	Macomb County (part): Sterling Heights (part); Warren (part)	2001 Apportionment Plan	
	Macomb County (part): Sterling Heights (part); Warren (part)	2011 Apportionment Plan	
	Wayne County (part): Canton Township (part); Dearborn Heights (part); Wayne; Westland (part)	2021 Apportionment Plan (Note: Referred to as the Hickory plan.)	

== Recent elections ==
=== 2020s ===
2026 Michigan House of Representatives election
Party	Candidate	Votes	%
Democratic	Peter Herzberg (incumbent)	24,615	66.39
Republican	Dawn Udell	12,464	33.61
Total votes		37,079	100
Democratic hold			

2024 Michigan House of Representatives election
Party	Candidate	Votes	%
Democratic	Peter Herzberg (incumbent)	26,092	58.93
Republican	Josh Powell	18,183	41.07
Total votes		44,275	100
Democratic hold			

2024 Michigan House of Representatives 25th district special election
Party	Candidate	Votes	%
Democratic	Peter Herzberg	6,373	59.62
Republican	Josh Powell	4,096	38.32
U.S. Taxpayers'	Robert Stano	220	2.06
Total votes		10,689	100
Democratic hold			

2022 Michigan House of Representatives election
Party	Candidate	Votes	%
Democratic	Kevin Coleman	21,204	63.34
Republican	Scott T. Barlow	12,273	36.66
Total votes		33,477	100
Democratic hold			

2020 Michigan House of Representatives election
Party	Candidate	Votes	%
Democratic	Nate Shannon (incumbent)	25,239	52.86
Republican	Paul M. Smith	22,509	47.14
Total votes		47,748	100
Democratic hold			

=== 2010s ===
2018 Michigan House of Representatives election
Party	Candidate	Votes	%
Democratic	Nate Shannon	19,081	54.04
Republican	Jazmine M. Early	16,228	45.96
Total votes		35,309	100
Democratic hold			

2016 Michigan House of Representatives election
Party	Candidate	Votes	%
Democratic	Henry Yanez (incumbent)	21,899	54.11
Republican	Steve Naumovski	18,573	45.89
Total votes		40,472	100
Democratic hold			

2014 Michigan House of Representatives election
Party	Candidate	Votes	%
Democratic	Henry Yanez (incumbent)	14,974	53.48
Republican	Nick Hawatmeh	13,026	46.52
Total votes		28,000	100
Democratic hold			

2012 Michigan House of Representatives election
Party	Candidate	Votes	%
Democratic	Henry Yanez	20,771	51.43
Republican	Sean Clark	19,617	48.57
Total votes		40,388	100
Democratic hold			

2010 Michigan House of Representatives election
Party	Candidate	Votes	%
Democratic	Jon M. Switalski (incumbent)	14,891	51.53
Republican	Sean Clark	13,167	45.56
U.S. Taxpayers'	Steven T. Revis	427	1.48
Libertarian	James Allison	413	1.43
Total votes		28,898	100
Democratic hold			

=== 2000s ===
2008 Michigan House of Representatives election
Party	Candidate	Votes	%
Democratic	Jon M. Switalski	26,874	62.94
Republican	Michael J. Wiecek	14,285	33.46
Libertarian	James Allison	653	1.53
Green	Richard T. Kuszmar	453	1.06
U.S. Taxpayers'	Steven T. Revis	433	1.01
Total votes		42,698	100
Democratic hold			

2006 Michigan House of Representatives election
Party	Candidate	Votes	%
Democratic	Steven Bieda (incumbent)	22,633	67.4
Republican	Cecil D. St. Pierre, Jr.	10,151	30.23
Libertarian	Michael Brylewski	794	2.36
Total votes		33,578	100
Democratic hold			

2004 Michigan House of Representatives election
Party	Candidate	Votes	%
Democratic	Steven Bieda (incumbent)	25,497	61.05
Republican	Michael J. Wiecek	16,269	38.95
Total votes		41,766	100
Democratic hold			

2002 Michigan House of Representatives election
Party	Candidate	Votes	%
Democratic	Steven Bieda	16,910	56.74
Republican	Keith Sadowski	12,893	43.26
Total votes		29,803	100
Democratic hold			

2000 Michigan House of Representatives election
Party	Candidate	Votes	%
Democratic	Gloria Schermesser (incumbent)	23,240	74.82
Republican	Jesse T. Church	6,759	21.76
Libertarian	John Morgan	1,063	3.42
Total votes		31,062	100
Democratic hold			

=== 1990s ===
1998 Michigan House of Representatives election
Party	Candidate	Votes	%
Democratic	Gloria Schermesser (incumbent)	16,376	69.39
Republican	David Stone	6,586	27.91
Libertarian	Nick Stoner	637	2.7
Total votes		23,599	100
Democratic hold			
