= Derek E. Miller =

American politician from Michigan

Macomb County Treasurer
- In office February 1, 2016 – December 31, 2016
- Preceded by: Ted Wahby
- Succeeded by: Larry Rocca

Member of the Michigan House of Representatives from the 28th district
- In office January 1, 2015 – February 1, 2016
- Preceded by: Jon Switalski
- Succeeded by: Patrick Green

Personal details
- Born: October 25, 1983 (age 42) Warren, Michigan
- Party: Democratic
- Education: Michigan State University (Political Science); University of Detroit Mercy School of Law (J.D.)

Derek E. Miller (born October 25, 1983) is the former Treasurer of Macomb County, Michigan. Previously, he was elected to the Michigan House of Representatives in 2014 and served as an Assistant Prosecutor in Macomb County, a role he returned to in 2017. In 2025, Miller launched his law practice and consulting firm, D. Miller Law P.C. The firm specializes in assisting those seeking Social Security Disability Benefits and Criminal Defense.

== Background ==
Miller has been an Assistant Prosecuting Attorney for Macomb County. He has served as a trial attorney for the Prosecutor's Office in both Circuit and District Courts. He also held a position in the Senior Crimes Unit, which specializes in prosecuting criminals who prey on the elderly. He also served as his office's liaison to Warren and Center Line's Drug Court and has served on the Roseville 39th District Sobriety Court. Prior to his career in law enforcement, Miller worked as a sole practitioner attorney. He received his bachelor's degree in political science from Michigan State University and Juris Doctor from the University of Detroit Mercy School of Law.

He was born and raised in Warren, where he graduated from Cousino High School and continues to make his birth city and state of Michigan home.

== Political career ==
After serving for four years in the Macomb County Prosecutor's Office Miller sought to succeed term-limited state Rep. Jon Switalski in the Michigan House of Representatives. Miller won the Democratic nomination uncontested and won the general election with ease, defeating Republican Beth Foster, taking 64 percent of the vote.

On December 5, 2015, Macomb County Treasurer Ted Wahby died at the age of 84, after being elected five times as treasurer and serving since 1995. After an extended search, Miller was appointed Macomb County Treasurer on January 29, 2016. Miller was sworn in as treasurer by Associate Justice of the Michigan Supreme Court David Viviano and formally resigned his seat in the state legislature on February 1, 2016. Miller won the Democratic nomination uncontested for a full-term on August 2, and was slated to face Republican Larry Rocca in the general election.

Miller was narrowly upset by Rocca in his bid for a full term, in what many believe was on the coattails of Republican Presidential nominee Donald Trump. Trump garnered 54 percent of the vote in Macomb County, which also saw Republicans Candice Miller and Karen Spangler win countywide races as Public Works Commissioner and County Clerk respectively and Trump became the first Republican to carry Michigan in a presidential election since 1988. Following the expiration of his term as County Treasurer, Miller returned to the Macomb County Prosecutor's Office as an assistant prosecutor. In 2017 Miller prosecuted cases in District and Circuit Courts. He was then named the lead prosecutor in the court room of James Biernat, Chief Judge of the 16th Circuit Court. In 2018, Miller was appointed to Chief of Operations under Prosecutor Eric Smith.

== Corruption Arrest ==
On March 24, 2020, Michigan Attorney General Dana Nessel charged Miller, Macomb County Prosecutor Eric Smith and two others with multiple felony counts related to embezzlement for allegedly misusing taxpayer funds for personal use. Miller is charged with official misconduct in office and conspiracy to commit a legal act in an illegal manner; both felonies with a maximum penalty of five-years in prison. Smith was charged with 10 felonies, including one count of running a criminal enterprise, which carries a maximum of 20 years in prison. Nessel's office alleged that Smith misused approximately $600,000 in funds from forfeiture accounts. Smith resigned as prosecutor on March 30, 2020, Miller was placed on paid administrative leave by Acting Macomb County Prosecutor Jean Cloud on April 3, 2020. Miller was formally arraigned via video conference on May 12, 2020, and was released on $100,000 personal recognizance bond. On September 25, 2023, 4 and a half years after originally being charged, the State of Michigan dismissed all charges against Derek Miller.

== Family connections ==
His grandfather, Art Miller, became the first mayor of the city of Warren in 1957. His grandmother, Edna Miller, was the first woman elected Macomb County Clerk and served for over 28 years. Derek's father, Art Miller Jr., served in the Michigan Senate from 1977 to 2003, where he was the Democratic Leader of the Senate. He sponsored and directed over 300 pieces of legislation during his 25 years of Senate leadership. Art Miller Jr. died June 25, 2020, at the age of 73 due to lung cancer.

== Post career ==
After leaving Political life, Derek Miller became Director of Business Development for Coyote Logistics, a UPS Company, in April 2022. In September 2024, UPS sold Coyote to RXO where Miller continued as a Key Account Manager. In January 2025, Derek E. Miller launched D. Miller Law P.C., a firm that specializes in Social Security Disability, Government Consulting as well as Criminal Defense. The marketing slogan of the practice is “Where D Stands for Disability and Defense” and the number is 855-Let-D-Help.

== Election results ==
Michigan House of Representatives 28th District election, 2014
Party	Candidate	Votes	%	±%
Democratic	Derek E. Miller	13,363	64.3	−7.2
Republican	Beth Foster	7,425	35.7	+7.2
Majority		5,938	28.6	−14.4
Turnout		20,788		−38.1
Democratic hold				

Macomb County Treasurer Election, 2016
Party	Candidate	Votes	%	±%
Republican	Larry Rocca	189.564	50.2	+7.8
Democratic	Derek E. Miller (I)	187,952	49.8	−7.8
Majority		1,612	+0.4	−15.6
Turnout		377,516		+2.9
Swing to Republican from Democratic		Swing		
