= Steve Bieda =

American politician (born 1961)

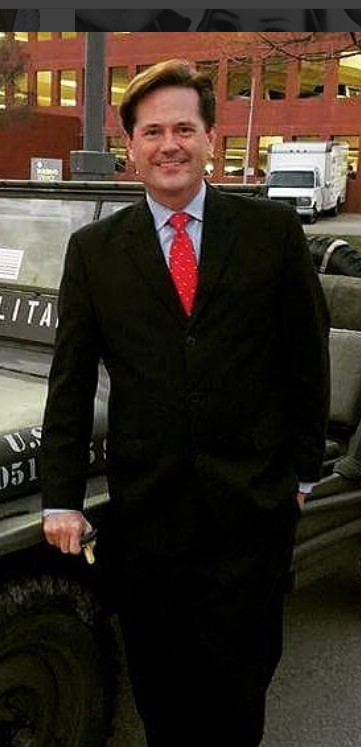

Member of the Michigan Senate from the 9th district
- In office January 1, 2011 – January 1, 2019
- Preceded by: Dennis Olshove
- Succeeded by: Paul Wojno

Member of the Michigan House of Representatives from the 25th district
- In office January 1, 2003 – January 1, 2009
- Preceded by: Gloria Schermesser
- Succeeded by: Jon Switalski

Personal details
- Born: January 21, 1961 (age 65) Warren, Michigan, U.S.
- Party: Democratic
- Education: Wayne State University (BA, MPA, LLM); University of Detroit (JD)

Steven Marion Bieda (born January 21, 1961) is an American politician and member of the Democratic Party who is the former Assistant Democratic Floor Leader of the Michigan State Senate.

Bieda has served in the Michigan Senate since 2011, representing the 9th district, which includes the communities of Center Line, Eastpointe, Fraser, Roseville, Warren, and portions of Clinton Township and Grosse Pointe Shores.

In December 2017, Bieda announced he would seek election to the U.S. House of Representatives in 2018, representing Michigan's 9th Congressional District. He ultimately lost the nomination to now incumbent representative Andy Levin. In February 2023 Bieda was appointed by Governor Gretchen Whitmer to the 37th District Court in Warren, Michigan.

== Early life, education, and career ==
Bieda was raised in Warren, Michigan, and attended Cousino High School.

He received his bachelor's degree and Masters in Public Administration from Wayne State University, and later earned a Juris Doctor from the University of Detroit Mercy School of Law as well as a Master of Laws in taxation from Wayne State University Law School.

Before seeking public office, Bieda worked as the Director of Labor Relations for the City of Warren, and as a Senior Policy Analyst for the Michigan House of Representatives.

== Michigan House of Representatives ==
In 2002, Bieda was elected to the Michigan House of Representatives for the 25th District.

His first term as State Representative, Bieda voted against a 2004 measure banning same-sex marriage in Michigan, which caused pundits to rank him as one of the three most vulnerable members of the House.

He went on to be re-elected in 2004 and 2006.

== Michigan State Senate ==
Bieda was elected to the Michigan State Senate in November 2010, and was re-elected in November 2014.

Bieda has sponsored and passed more than 50 bills and public acts, in addition to co-sponsoring hundreds of others, as he's served in both the majority and minority during his tenure.

In Lansing, Bieda is known as a "policy wonk" and is noted to have "an ability to work with Republicans in the legislature; he finally got them to pass a law to pay compensation to innocent people who were wrongly convicted and imprisoned."

Governor Whitmer appointed Mr. Bieda as Chairman of the Michigan Tax Tribunal within the Department of Licensing and Regulatory Affairs.

== Personal life ==
Bieda designed the reverse side of the U.S. Olympic Half Dollar that was issued in 1992. His design is an image of the Olympic torch and an olive branch. The inscriptions above and below read "United States of America" and "Half Dollar". A central inscription reads "Citius Altius Fortius" which is Latin for "Faster, Higher, Stronger".

== Electoral history ==
2002 Michigan House of Representatives, District 25
Party	Candidate	Votes	%
Democratic	Steve Bieda	16,910	56.74
Republican	Keith Sadowski	12,893	43.26
Total votes		29,803	100.00

2004 Michigan House of Representatives, District 25
Party	Candidate	Votes	%
Democratic	Steve Bieda	25,497	61.05
Republican	Michael Wiecek	16,269	38.95
Total votes		41,766	100.00

2006 Michigan House of Representatives, District 25
Party	Candidate	Votes	%
Democratic	Steve Bieda	22,633	67.40
Republican	Cecil D. St. Pierre Jr.	10,151	30.23
Libertarian	Michael Brylewski	794	2.36
Total votes		33,578	100.00

2010 Michigan State Senate, District 9
Party	Candidate	Votes	%
Democratic	Steve Bieda	42,039	54.34
Republican	Michael Ennis	33,258	42.99
Green	Richard Kuszmar	2,072	2.68
Total votes		77,369	100.00

2014 Michigan State Senate, District 9
Party	Candidate	Votes	%
Democratic	Steve Bieda	48,146	67.96
Republican	Hawke Fracassa	22,699	32.04
Total votes		70,845	100.00
