= Michigan's 13th House of Representatives district =

American legislative district

Michigan's 13th State House of Representatives district
Representative
Mai Xiong; D–Warren
- Demographics: 70.2% White; 17.5% Black; 3.3% Hispanic; 4.2% Asian; 0.1% Native American; 0.3% Other; 4.5% Multiracial
- Population (2024): 91,268

Michigan's 13th House of Representatives district is a legislative district within the Michigan House of Representatives located in Macomb County. The district was created in 1965, when the Michigan Supreme Court ordered the reapportionment of state legislative districts from a county-based system to a proportional one following the Supreme Court case Reynolds v. Sims. It is currently represented by Democrat Mai Xiong of Warren.

== List of representatives ==
Representative	Party	Years	Residence	Notes
Edward K. Michalski	Democratic	1965–1966	Detroit	Reapportioned from the former Wayne County, 7th district.
Michael Novak	Democratic	1967–1972	Detroit	Previously served in the former Wayne County, 7th district; redistricted to the 10th district.
William R. Bryant Jr.	Republican	1973–1992	Grosse Pointe Farms	Redistricted from the 1st district; redistricted to the 1st district.
Burton Leland	Democratic	1993–1998	Detroit	Redistricted from the 2nd district; term limited.
Triette Lipsey Reeves	Democratic	1999–2002	Detroit	Previously served in the 5th district; redistricted to the 10th district.
Barbara A. Farrah	Democratic	2003–2008	Southgate	Term limited.
Andrew Kandrevas	Democratic	2009–2014	Southgate	Term limited.
Frank Liberati	Democratic	2015–2020	Allen Park	Term limited.
Tullio Liberati	Democratic	2021–2022	Allen Park	Redistricted to the 2nd district.
Lori Stone	Democratic	2023	Warren	Redistricted from the 28th district; resigned November 2023 after being elected mayor of Warren.
Mai Xiong	Democratic	2024 (Note: Elected in a 2024 special election to replace Rep. Lori Stone, who resigned.)–present	Warren	

== Historical district boundaries ==
Map	Description	Apportionment Plan	Notes
	Wayne County (part): Detroit (part)	1964 Apportionment Plan (Note: Referred to as the Austin-Kleiner plan.)	
	Wayne County (part): Detroit (part); Grosse Pointe; Grosse Pointe Farms; Grosse Pointe Park; Grosse Pointe Township; Grosse Pointe Woods; Harper Woods	1972 Apportionment Plan (Note: Referred to as the Hatcher-Kleiner plan.)	
	Wayne County (part): Detroit (part); Grosse Pointe; Grosse Pointe Farms; Grosse Pointe Park; Grosse Pointe Township; Grosse Pointe Woods; Harper Woods	1982 Apportionment Plan	
	Wayne County (part): Detroit (part)	1992 Apportionment Plan	
	Wayne County (part): Riverview; Southgate; Trenton; Wyandotte	2001 Apportionment Plan	
	Wayne County (part): Allen Park; Dearborn Heights (part); Southgate	2011 Apportionment Plan	
	Macomb County (part): Warren (part); Wayne County (part): Detroit (part)	2021 Apportionment Plan (Note: Referred to as the Hickory plan.)	
	Macomb County (part): Roseville (part); St. Clair Shores (part); Warren (part)	Remedial 2021 Apportionment Plan Approved in 2024 (Note: Referred to as the Motown Sound FC E1 plan.)	

== Recent elections ==
=== 2020s ===
2026 Michigan House of Representatives election
Party	Candidate	Votes	%
Democratic	Mai Xiong (incumbent)	24,417	60.01
Republican	Mark Thomas Foster	16,272	39.99
Total votes		40,689	100
Democratic hold			

2024 Michigan House of Representatives election
Party	Candidate	Votes	%
Democratic	Mai Xiong (incumbent)	24,911	50.82
Republican	Ronald Singer	22,673	46.26
Working Class	Hashim Malik Bakari	1,430	2.92
Total votes		49,014	100
Democratic hold			

2024 Michigan House of Representatives 13th district special election
Party	Candidate	Votes	%
Democratic	Mai Xiong	5,741	65.63
Republican	Ronald Singer	3,007	34.37
Total votes		8,748	100
Democratic hold			

2022 Michigan House of Representatives election
Party	Candidate	Votes	%
Democratic	Lori M. Stone	19,962	67.41
Republican	Ronald Singer	9,649	32.59
Total votes		29,611	100
Democratic hold			

2020 Michigan House of Representatives election
Party	Candidate	Votes	%
Democratic	Tullio Liberati, Jr.	26,720	57.99
Republican	Megan Frump	19,356	42.01
Total votes		46,076	100
Democratic hold			

=== 2010s ===
2018 Michigan House of Representatives election
Party	Candidate	Votes	%
Democratic	Frank Liberati (incumbent)	21,538	62.75
Republican	Annie Spencer	12,783	37.25
Total votes		34,321	100
Democratic hold			

2016 Michigan House of Representatives election
Party	Candidate	Votes	%
Democratic	Frank Liberati (incumbent)	23,744	60.76
Republican	Annie Spencer	15,336	39.24
Total votes		39,080	100
Democratic hold			

2014 Michigan House of Representatives election
Party	Candidate	Votes	%
Democratic	Frank Liberati	15,283	61.02
Republican	Harry Sawicki	9,762	38.98
Total votes		25,045	100
Democratic hold			

2012 Michigan House of Representatives election
Party	Candidate	Votes	%
Democratic	Andrew J. Kandrevas (incumbent)	25,496	64.56
Republican	Tony Amorose	13,996	35.44
Total votes		39,492	100
Democratic hold			

2010 Michigan House of Representatives election
Party	Candidate	Votes	%
Democratic	Andrew J. Kandrevas (incumbent)	14,338	52.67
Republican	Cynthia J. Kallgren	12,130	44.56
Libertarian	Jesse T. Church	755	2.77
Total votes		27,223	100
Democratic hold			

=== 2000s ===
2008 Michigan House of Representatives election
Party	Candidate	Votes	%
Democratic	Andrew J. Kandrevas	28,041	65.72
Republican	Timothy S. Kachinski	14,628	34.28
Total votes		42,669	100
Democratic hold			

2006 Michigan House of Representatives election
Party	Candidate	Votes	%
Democratic	Barbara A. Farrah (incumbent)	22,420	69.35
Republican	Darrell F. Stasik	9,908	30.65
Total votes		32,328	100
Democratic hold			

2004 Michigan House of Representatives election
Party	Candidate	Votes	%
Democratic	Barbara A. Farrah (incumbent)	26,396	64.02
Republican	Darrell F. Stasik	14,303	34.69
Libertarian	Bruce Morse	535	1.3
Total votes		41,234	100
Democratic hold			

2002 Michigan House of Representatives election
Party	Candidate	Votes	%
Democratic	Barbara A. Farrah	17,472	64.74
Republican	Darrell F. Stasik	8,905	32.99
Libertarian	Eric Gordon	613	2.27
Total votes		26,990	100
Democratic hold			

2000 Michigan House of Representatives election
Party	Candidate	Votes	%
Democratic	Triette Lipsey Reeves (incumbent)	21,395	92.32
Republican	Ernestine Nelson	1,779	7.68
Total votes		23,174	100
Democratic hold			

=== 1990s ===
1998 Michigan House of Representatives election
Party	Candidate	Votes	%
Democratic	Triette Lipsey Reeves	15,070	89.6
Republican	Leodis Brown	1,749	10.4
Total votes		16,819	100
Democratic hold			
