= Michigan's 28th House of Representatives district =

American legislative district

Michigan's 28th State House of Representatives district
Representative
Jamie Thompson; R–Brownstown Township
- Demographics: 75.3% White; 8.3% Black; 8.2% Hispanic; 2.9% Asian; 0.2% Native American; 0.3% Other; 4.8% Multiracial
- Population (2024): 89,653

Michigan's 28th House of Representatives district is a legislative district within the Michigan House of Representatives located in the counties of Monroe and Wayne. The district was created in 1965, when the Michigan Supreme Court ordered the reapportionment of state legislative districts from a county-based system to a proportional one following the Supreme Court case Reynolds v. Sims. It is currently represented by Republican Jamie Thompson of Brownstown Township.

== List of representatives ==
Representative	Party	Years	Residence	Notes
Thomas J. Anderson	Democratic	1965–1982	Southgate	
Robert A. DeMars	Democratic	1983–1992	Lincoln Park	Redistricted to the 25th district.
Lloyd "Pete" F. Weeks	Democratic	1993–1996	Warren	Redistricted from the 70th district.
Paul J. Wojno	Democratic	1997–2002	Warren	Term limited.
Lisa Wojno	Democratic	2003–2008	Warren	Term limited.
Lesia Liss	Democratic	2009–2012	Warren	
Jon M. Switalski	Democratic	2013–2014	Warren	Redistricted from the 25th district.
Derek Miller	Democratic	2015–2016	Warren	Resigned February 2016 after being appointed treasurer of Macomb County.
Patrick Green	Democratic	2016 (Note: Elected in a 2016 special election to replace Rep. Derek Miller, who resigned.)–2018	Warren	
Lori Stone	Democratic	2019–2022	Warren	Redistricted to the 13th district.
Jamie Thompson	Republican	2023–present	Brownstown Township	
Sherry A. Berecz	Democratic	(Note: Member-elect.)	Brownstown Township	

== Historical district boundaries ==
Map	Description	Apportionment Plan	Notes
	Wayne County (part): Gibraltar; Grosse Ile Township; Lincoln Park (part); Riverview; Southgate; Trenton (part); Wyandotte (part)	1964 Apportionment Plan	
	Wayne County (part): Lincoln Park (part); Southgate; Wyandotte (part)	1972 Apportionment Plan	
	Wayne County (part): Ecorse; Lincoln Park; Melvindale; River Rouge	1982 Apportionment Plan	
	Macomb County (part): Center Line; Warren (part)	1992 Apportionment Plan	
	Macomb County (part): Center Line; Warren (part)	2001 Apportionment Plan	
	Macomb County (part): Center Line; Warren (part)	2011 Apportionment Plan	
	Monroe County (part): Berlin Township; Frenchtown Township (part); Wayne County (part): Brownstown Township; Flat Rock; Rockwood; Taylor (part); Woodhaven	2021 Apportionment Plan	

== Recent elections ==
=== 2020s ===
2026 Michigan House of Representatives election
Party	Candidate	Votes	%
Democratic	Sherry A. Berecz	20,928	50.88
Republican	Jamie Thompson (incumbent)	20,204	49.12
Total votes		41,132	100
Democratic gain from Republican			

2024 Michigan House of Representatives election
Party	Candidate	Votes	%
Republican	Jamie Thompson (incumbent)	26,754	54.36
Democratic	Janise O'Neil Robinson	22,458	45.64
Total votes		49,212	100
Republican hold			

2022 Michigan House of Representatives election
Party	Candidate	Votes	%
Republican	Jamie Thompson	18,969	50.99
Democratic	Robert Kull	18,234	49.01
Total votes		37,203	100
Republican gain from Democratic			

2020 Michigan House of Representatives election
Party	Candidate	Votes	%
Democratic	Lori M. Stone (incumbent)	24,585	60.3
Republican	Stephen Colegio	15,329	37.6
Libertarian	Frederick Horndt	859	2.11
Total votes		40,773	100
Democratic hold			

=== 2010s ===
2018 Michigan House of Representatives election
Party	Candidate	Votes	%
Democratic	Lori M. Stone	18,513	62.97
Republican	Aaron Delikta	10,115	34.41
Libertarian	Ryan Manier	771	2.62
Total votes		29,399	100
Democratic hold			

2016 Michigan House of Representatives election
Party	Candidate	Votes	%
Democratic	Patrick Green (incumbent)	22,680	66.33
Republican	Antoine M. Davison	11,514	33.67
Total votes		34,194	100
Democratic hold			

2016 Michigan House of Representatives 28th district special election
Party	Candidate	Votes	%
Democratic	Patrick Green	22,157	66.07
Republican	Antoine M. Davison	11,381	33.93
Total votes		33,538	100
Democratic hold			

2014 Michigan House of Representatives election
Party	Candidate	Votes	%
Democratic	Derek E. Miller	13,363	64.28
Republican	Beth Foster	7,425	35.72
Total votes		20,788	100
Democratic hold			

2012 Michigan House of Representatives election
Party	Candidate	Votes	%
Democratic	Jon M. Switalski	24,025	71.49
Republican	Steven Klusek	9,580	28.51
Total votes		33,605	100
Democratic hold			

2010 Michigan House of Representatives election
Party	Candidate	Votes	%
Democratic	Lesia Liss (incumbent)	12,389	57.81
Republican	Marc Goodson	7,281	33.97
Independent	Gloria Sankuer	1,762	8.22
Total votes		21,432	100
Democratic hold			

=== 2000s ===
2008 Michigan House of Representatives election
Party	Candidate	Votes	%
Democratic	Lesia Liss	24,659	70.45
Republican	Jason E. Balaska	10,342	29.55
Total votes		35,001	100
Democratic hold			

2006 Michigan House of Representatives election
Party	Candidate	Votes	%
Democratic	Lisa Wojno (incumbent)	19,965	75.18
Republican	Timothy C. Knue	6,591	24.82
Total votes		26,556	100
Democratic hold			

2004 Michigan House of Representatives election
Party	Candidate	Votes	%
Democratic	Lisa Wojno (incumbent)	24,288	70.23
Republican	Timothy C. Knue	9,748	28.19
Libertarian	Stephen J. Samoranski, II	547	1.58
Total votes		34,583	100
Democratic hold			

2002 Michigan House of Representatives election
Party	Candidate	Votes	%
Democratic	Lisa Wojno	14,998	67.27
Republican	Scott C. Stevens	6,883	30.87
Libertarian	James Allison	415	1.86
Total votes		22,296	100
Democratic hold			

2000 Michigan House of Representatives election
Party	Candidate	Votes	%
Democratic	Paul Wojno (incumbent)	20,522	73.13
Republican	Paul Welch	7,540	26.87
Total votes		28,062	100
Democratic hold			

=== 1990s ===
1998 Michigan House of Representatives election
Party	Candidate	Votes	%
Democratic	Paul Wojno (incumbent)	15,858	70.88
Republican	Paul Welch	6,073	27.14
Libertarian	Ronald Burcham	442	1.98
Total votes		22,373	100
Democratic hold			
