= Macomb County Board of Commissioners =

Political body

Type
- Type: Unicameral

Leadership
- Chairman: Joe Sabatini since 2025
- Vice Chair: Harold Haugh since 2021
- Sergeant-at-Arms: Sylvia Grot since 2023

Structure
- Seats: 13
- Political groups: Majority: Republican (8); Minority: Democratic (5)
- Length of term: 4 years (2 years prior to 2025)

Elections
- Last election: 2024
- Next election: 2028

Meeting place
- Macomb County Administration Building; 1 South Main Street 9th Floor Mt. Clemens, Michigan

Website
- Board of Commissioners website

The Macomb County Board of Commissioners is the legislative branch of the government of Macomb County, Michigan. It is composed of 13 commissioners elected to single-member districts in presidential election years; prior to the 2024 election, commissioners served two-year terms.

== Commissioners ==
The 2025–2028 makeup of the board is as follows:

Commissioner Goike was appointed by the board to fill a vacancy created by the resignation of ex-commissioner Don Brown. The board has scheduled a special election to coincide with Michigan's regular elections in 2026, and the winner of that election will serve for the rest of the term.

District	Communities included	Commissioner	Party	Residence	Since
1	Armada, Armada Township, Bruce Township, Ray Township, Richmond, Richmond Township, Shelby Township, Washington Township	Ken Goike (appointed)	Republican	Ray Township	2025
2	Chesterfield Township, Lenox Township, New Baltimore, New Haven	Phil Kraft	Republican	Chesterfield Township	2017
3	Shelby Township, Utica	Sylvia Grot	Republican	Shelby Township	2023
4	Macomb Township	Joe Sabatini	Republican	Macomb Township	2021
5	Sterling Heights	Don VanSyckel	Republican	Sterling Heights	2021
6	Sterling Heights	Joseph Romano	Republican	Sterling Heights	2017
7	Clinton Township, Macomb Township, Shelby Township	James Perna	Republican	Clinton Township	2023
8	Clinton Township, Mt. Clemens	Antoinette Wallace	Democratic	Mt. Clemens	2021
9	Grosse Pointe Shores, Harrison Township, St. Clair Shores	Barbara Zinner	Republican	Harrison Township	2021
10	Clinton Township, Fraser, Roseville	Harold Haugh	Democratic	Roseville	2019
11	Warren	Lisa Wojno	Democratic	Warren	2025
12	Center Line, Warren	Michael Howard	Democratic	Warren	2025
13	Eastpointe, St. Clair Shores, Warren	Sarah Lucido	Democratic	Eastpointe	2023

== Authority ==
The powers, duties, and responsibilities of the Macomb County Board are established by Michigan law and the county charter approved by voters in 2009. Committees include the Finance/Audit/Budget, Government Oversight, Internal Services, Public Safety and Records, Health and Human Services committees.

According to the charter, the Commission may:

(a) Adopt, amend, or repeal ordinances or resolutions;

(b) Establish committees of the Commission necessary to efficiently conduct the business of the Commission;

(c) Appropriate funds, levy taxes, fees, and other charges, and authorize borrowing as provided by this Charter and applicable laws;

(d) Approve contracts of the County;

(e) Approve or reject appointments by the Executive as provided by this Charter;

(f) Override a veto by the Executive within 30 days by at least two-thirds of the Commissioners serving;

(g) Subpoena individuals, compel the production of records, and administer oaths;

(h) Appoint, approve, and remove members of committees, boards, and commissions as provided by this Charter or law;

(i) Submit tax and ballot proposals to the electorate; and

(j) Exercise any power granted by law to charter or general law counties unless otherwise provided by this Charter.

Previously made up of 26 members with both administrative and legislative control of county departments and budgets, the Board was reduced from 26 to 13 members in January 2011, when a new county charter was enacted and Macomb County's first Executive was elected to oversee administrative functions.
