= 2020 Michigan House of Representatives election =

- November 3, 2020

All 110 seats in the Michigan House of Representatives 56 seats needed for a majority
- Turnout: 66.36% ▲11.72 pp
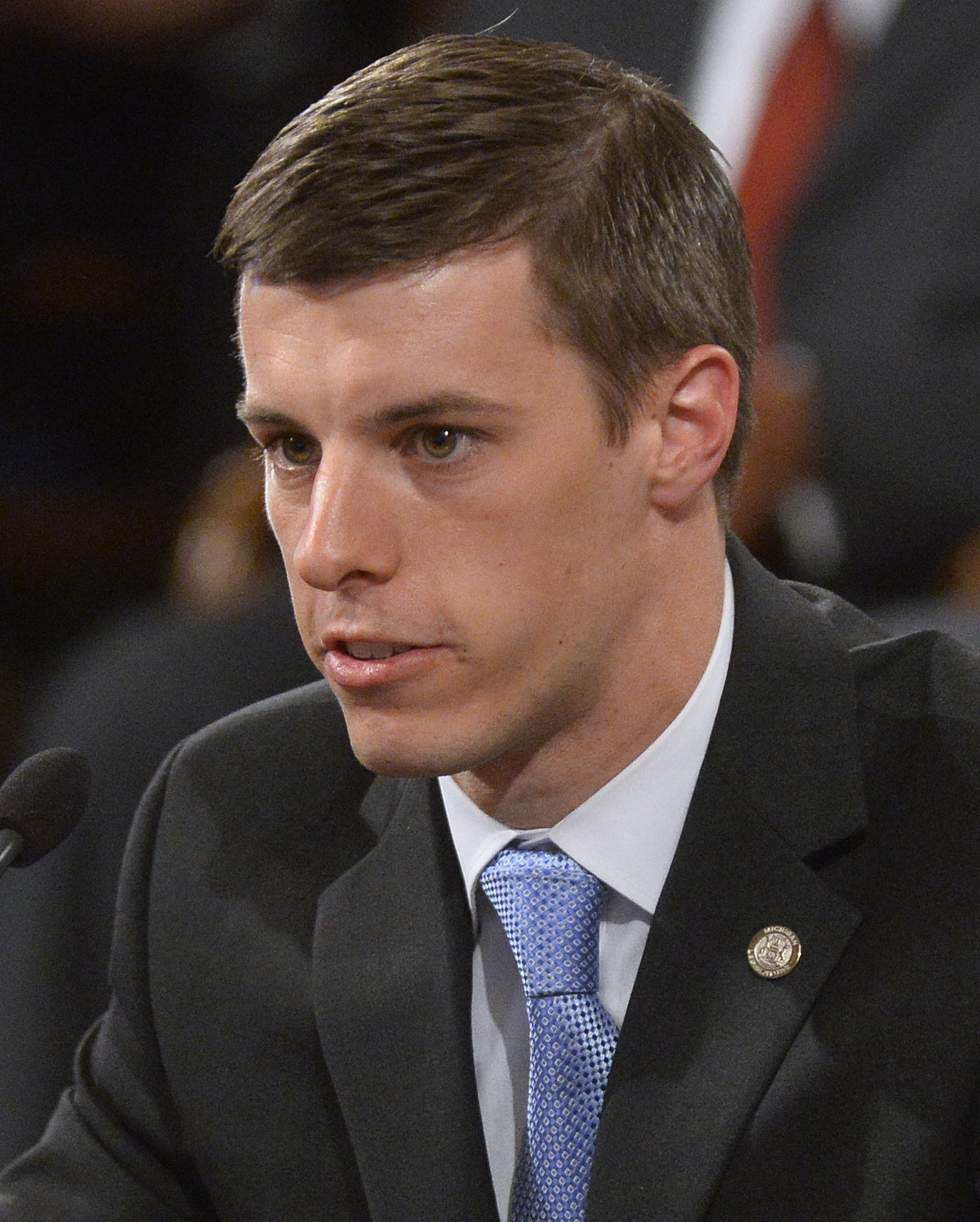

	Majority party	Minority party
Leader	Lee Chatfield (term-limited)	Christine Greig (term-limited)
Party	Republican	Democratic
Leader since	January 9, 2019	January 9, 2019
Leader's seat	107th District	37th District
Seats before	58	52
Seats won	58	52
Seat change	Steady	Steady
Popular vote	2,653,603	2,667,279
Percentage	49.60%	49.86%
Swing	▲2.20%	▼2.27%
- Democratic gain Republican gain Democratic hold Republican hold Republican: 50–60% 60–70% 70–80% Democratic: 50–60% 60–70% 70–80% 80–90% >90%
Speaker before election
Lee Chatfield
Republican
Elected Speaker
Jason Wentworth
Republican

An election was held on November 3, 2020, to elect all 110 members of Michigan's House of Representatives.

The election was held alongside numerous other state and federal elections, and saw the Republican Party retain control of the chamber.

== Background ==
In the 2018 Michigan House of Representatives election, the Michigan Republican Party narrowly retained their majority on the chamber.

Despite the COVID-19 pandemic, elections proceeded as planned, though with a larger number of mail-in ballots than usual.

In October 2020, The Washington Post identified this state election as one of eight whose outcomes could affect partisan balance during post-census redistricting.

== Term-limited members ==
Under the Michigan Constitution, members of the state Senate can only serve two four-year terms, and members of the House of Representatives are limited to three two-year terms, some of the toughest term-limit laws in the country.

=== Democrats ===
- LaTanya Garrett
- Wendell Byrd
- Vanessa Guerra

=== Republicans ===
- Kathy Crawford
- Larry C. Inman

== Marginal districts ==
The following districts would be considered marginal seats.

=== Republican-held targets ===
These Republican-held districts were the most vulnerable to Democratic challengers.

District	Incumbent	Held since	% to gain	Result	
District	Incumbent	Held since	% to gain	Net	Elected Rep.
79th district	Pauline Wendzel	2019	11.36%	Republican hold	Pauline Wendzel
17th district	Joe Bellino	2017	11.32%	Republican hold	Joe Bellino
24th district	Steve Marino	2017	11.08%	Republican hold	Steve Marino
94th district	Rodney Wakeman	2019	10.98%	Republican hold	Rodney Wakeman
45th district	Michael Webber	2015	10.24%	Republican hold	Mark Tisdel
93rd district	Graham Filler	2019	7.89%	Republican hold	Graham Filler
99th district	Roger Hauck	2017	6.84%	Republican hold	Roger Hauck
98th district	Annette Glenn	2019	4.06%	Republican hold	Annette Glenn
61st district	Brandt Iden	2015	2.74%	Democratic gain	Christine Morse
110th district	Gregory Markkanen	2019	1.64%	Republican hold	Gregory Markkanen
38th district	Kathy Crawford	2015	1.30%	Democratic gain	Kelly Breen
104th district	Larry C. Inman	2015	0.74%	Republican hold	John Roth

=== Democratic-held targets ===
These Democratic districts were the most vulnerable to Republican challengers.

District	Incumbent	Held since	% to gain	Result	
District	Incumbent	Held since	% to gain	Net	Elected Rep.
50th district	Tim Sneller	2017	14.35%	Democratic hold	Tim Sneller
40th district	Mari Manoogian	2019	13.10%	Democratic hold	Mari Manoogian
96th district	Brian Elder	2017	13.02%	Republican gain	Timothy Beson
23rd district	Darrin Camilleri	2017	12.52%	Democratic hold	Darrin Camilleri
67th district	Kara Hope	2019	9.79	Democratic hold	Kara Hope
48th district	Sheryl Kennedy	2019	9.66%	Republican gain	David Martin
25th district	Nate Shannon	2019	8.08%	Democratic hold	Nate Shannon
62nd district	Jim Haadsma	2019	3.70%	Democratic hold	Jim Haadsma
20th district	Matt Koleszar	2019	2.84%	Democratic hold	Matt Koleszar
41st district	Padma Kuppa	2019	2.64%	Democratic hold	Padma Kuppa
71st district	Angela Witwer	2019	1.60%	Democratic hold	Angela Witwer
19th district	Laurie Pohutsky	2019	0.48%	Democratic hold	Laurie Pohutsky

== Predictions ==
Source	Ranking	As of
The Cook Political Report	Tossup	October 21, 2020

== Close races ==
Seats where the margin of victory was under 10%:

1. District 19, 0.4%
2. District 48, 1% (gain)
3. District 62, 2.64%
4. District 38, 3.24% (gain)
5. District 104, 3.87%
6. District 71, 3.91%
7. District 45, 4.7%
8. District 23, 5.1%
9. District 39, 5.39%
10. District 25, 5.72%
11. District 61, 8.14% (gain)
12. District 50, 8.48%
13. District 67, 8.68%
14. District 96, 9.2% (gain)

== Results by district ==
=== District 1 ===
In the 1st district Democratic incumbent Tenisha Yancey won her primary unopposed on August 4. On November 3, Yancey defeated the Republican nominee, Latricia Ann Lanier, in the general election.

Democratic Primary
Party	Candidate	Votes	%
Democratic	Tenisha R. Yancey (incumbent)	12,373	100.0
Total votes		12,373	100.0

Republican Primary
Party	Candidate	Votes	%
Republican	Latricia Ann Lanier	2,568	100.0
Total votes		2,568	100.0

General Election
Party	Candidate	Votes	%
Democratic	Tenisha R. Yancey (incumbent)	29,742	75.81%
Republican	Latricia Ann Lanier	8,698	22.18%
Libertarian	Gregory Creswell	785	2%
Total votes			100.0

=== District 2 ===
In the 2nd district, Joe Tate won re-election.

Democratic Primary
Party	Candidate	Votes	%
Democratic	Joe Tate (incumbent)	9,775	68.96
Democratic	Taylor Harrell	4,400	31.04
Total votes		14,175	100.0

Republican Primary
Party	Candidate	Votes	%
Republican	Mayra Rodriguez	2,626	100.0
Total votes		2,626	100.0

General Election
Party	Candidate	Votes	%
Democratic	Joe Tate (incumbent)	28,196	74.12
Republican	Mayra Rodriguez	9,043	23.77
Independent	DaNetta L. Simpson	804	2.11
Total votes		38,043	100.0

=== District 3 ===
Incumbent Democrat Wendell Byrd stood down in the 3rd district due to term limits.

Democratic Primary
Party	Candidate	Votes	%
Democratic	Shri Thanedar	4,745	34.91
Democratic	Donavan McKinney	2,774	20.41
Democratic	China Cochran	2,276	16.75
Democratic	Al Williams	2,222	16.35
Democratic	John Cromer	520	3.83
Democratic	Art Tyus	468	3.44
Democratic	Keith McMurtry	467	3.44
Democratic	Steven Lett	120	0.88
Total votes		13,592	100.0

Republican Primary
Party	Candidate	Votes	%
Republican	Anita Vinson	191	100.0
Total votes		191	100.0

General Election
Party	Candidate	Votes	%
Democratic	Shri Thanedar	28,575	93.32
Republican	Anita Vinson	1,234	4.03
Green	Stephen Boyle	813	2.65
Total votes		30,622	100.0

=== District 4 ===
Incumbent representative Isaac Robinson died in March 2020 of a suspected COVID-19 infection. Twelve Democrats ran to succeed him, but Abraham Aiyash was elected as the Democratic nominee for the seat. On November 3, Aiyash defeated the Republican nominee Howard Weathington in the general election.

Democratic Primary
Party	Candidate	Votes	%
Democratic	Abraham Aiyash	5,355	38.38
Democratic	Michele Oberholtzer	1,945	13.94
Democratic	Tawanna Simpson	1,518	10.88
Democratic	Tonya Myers Phillips	1,417	10.16
Democratic	Delorean Holmes	1,002	7.18
Democratic	Shahab Ahmed	834	5.98
Democratic	Christopher L Collins	655	4.69
Democratic	Frazier H. Kimpson	515	3.69
Democratic	Abraham D. Shaw	254	1.82
Democratic	Anthony Ali	150	1.08
Democratic	Sigmunt John Szczepkowski, Jr.	148	1.06
Democratic	Gregory W. Reyner	97	0.70
Democratic	Darwood Navarro	63	0.45
Total votes		13,953	100.0

Republican Primary
Party	Candidate	Votes	%
Republican	Howard Weathington	329	100.0
Total votes		329	100.0

General Election
Party	Candidate	Votes	%
Democratic	Abraham Aiyash (incumbent)	27,263	89.75
Republican	Howard Weathington	1,736	5.71
Working Class	Linda Rayburn	1,023	3.37
Independent	Md Rabbi Alam	355	1.17
Total votes		30,377	100.0

=== District 5 ===
In the 5th district, Cynthia A. Johnson faced two Democratic challengers in the primary. Jermaine Tobey and Rita Ross, the sister of singer Diana Ross. Johnson won her primary and won against Republican nominee Harold Day in the general election.

Democratic Primary
Party	Candidate	Votes	%
Democratic	Cynthia A. Johnson (incumbent)	4,858	65.04
Democratic	Rita Ross	2,120	28.38
Democratic	Jermaine R. Tobey	491	6.57
Total votes		7,469	100.0

Republican Primary
Party	Candidate	Votes	%
Republican	Harold M. Day	205	100.0
Total votes		205	100.0

General Election
Party	Candidate	Votes	%
Democratic	Cynthia A. Johnson (incumbent)	18,658	93.41
Republican	Harold M. Day	1,317	6.59
Total votes		19,975	100.0

=== District 6 ===
In the 6th district, Democrat Tyrone Carter is running for re-election in the general election unopposed. He won his primary election, beating challengers Ivy Nichole Neal and David Palmer. There was no Republican primary held.

Democratic Primary
Party	Candidate	Votes	%
Democratic	Tyrone Carter (incumbent)	8,163	62.50
Democratic	Ivy Nichole Neal	2,624	20.09
Democratic	David Palmer	2,273	17.40
Total votes		13,060	100.0

General Election
Party	Candidate	Votes	%
Democratic	Tyrone Carter (incumbent)	28,161	100
Total votes		28,161	100.0

=== District 7 ===
Incumbent Democrat LaTanya Garrett stood down in the 7th district due to term limits. Helena Scott was the Democratic nominee and Ronald Cole was the Republican nominee. On November 3, Scott defeated Cole in the general election.

Democratic Primary
Party	Candidate	Votes	%
Democratic	Helena Scott	5,504	36.59
Democratic	Cynthia L. Thornton	2,770	18.41
Democratic	Bernard Thompson	2,311	15.36
Democratic	Lee Yancy	1,585	10.54
Democratic	Anistia Thomas	1,580	10.50
Democratic	Elene Robinson	716	4.76
Democratic	Nyda Bentley	577	3.84
Democratic	William Phillips (write-in)	1	0.01
Total votes		15,044	100.0

Republican Primary
Party	Candidate	Votes	%
Republican	Ronald Cole	128	100.0
Total votes		128	100.0

General Election
Party	Candidate	Votes	%
Democratic	Helena Scott	32,483	93.03
Working Class	Kimberly Givens	1,224	3.51
Republican	Ronald Cole	791	2.27
Green	Anita Belle	420	1.20
Total votes		34,918	100.0

=== District 8 ===
Incumbent Democrat Sherry Gay-Dagnogo did not run in the primary, instead running to be on the Detroit school board. Democrat Stephanie Young was elected as the Democratic nominee in the 8th district. On November 3, Young defeated Republican nominee Miroslawa Teresa Gorak in the general election.

Democratic Primary
Party	Candidate	Votes	%
Democratic	Stephanie A. Young	7,490	44.78
Democratic	Reggie Reg Davis	5,214	31.17
Democratic	George Etheridge	2,642	15.80
Democratic	Anthony Bradford	1,380	8.25
Total votes		16,726	100.0

Republican Primary
Party	Candidate	Votes	%
Republican	Miroslawa Teresa Gorak	238	100.0
Total votes		238	100.0

General Election
Party	Candidate	Votes	%
Democratic	Stephanie A. Young	35,945	96.74
Republican	Miroslawa Teresa Gorak	1,210	3.26
Total votes		37,155	100.0

=== District 9 ===
In the 9th district, Democrat Karen Whitsett won re-election.

Democratic Primary
Party	Candidate	Votes	%
Democratic	Karen Whitsett (incumbent)	4,996	44.68
Democratic	Rosyln M. Ogburn	3,437	30.74
Democratic	Marc Cummings	2,032	18.17
Democratic	Nicole Elcock	717	6.41
Total votes		11,182	100.0

Republican Primary
Party	Candidate	Votes	%
Republican	James Stephens	309	100.0
Total votes		309	100.0

General Election
Party	Candidate	Votes	%
Democratic	Karen Whitsett (incumbent)	29,047	94.18
Republican	James Stephens	1,794	5.82
Total votes		30,841	100.0

=== District 10 ===
In the 10th district, incumbent Democrat Leslie Love was unable to run for re-election due to term limits.

Democratic Primary
Party	Candidate	Votes	%
Democratic	Mary Cavanagh	5,250	29.44
Democratic	Brenda Hill	4,119	23.10
Democratic	Kevin Lamont Harris	3,674	20.60
Democratic	Diajah Ruffin	1,418	7.95
Democratic	Tyson Kelley	1,342	7.53
Democratic	Marcus A. Cummings	1,089	6.11
Democratic	Steele P. Hughes	735	4.12
Democratic	Valli Smith	204	1.14
Total votes		17,831	100.0

Republican Primary
Party	Candidate	Votes	%
Republican	Cathy L. Alcorn	1,694	100.0
Total votes		1,694	100.0

General Election
Party	Candidate	Votes	%
Democratic	Mary Cavanagh	38,144	84.75
Republican	Cathy L. Alcorn	6,863	15.25
Total votes		45,007	100.0

=== District 11 ===
In the 11th district, incumbent Democrat Jewell Jones won re-election.

Democratic Party
Party	Candidate	Votes	%
Democratic	Jewell Jones (incumbent)	11,544	11544
Total votes		11,544	100.0

Republican Primary
Party	Candidate	Votes	%
Republican	James C. Townsend	4,156	100.0
Total votes		4,156	100.0

General Election
Party	Candidate	Votes	%
Democratic	Jewell Jones (incumbent)	28,182	65.22
Republican	James C. Townsend	15,030	34.78
Total votes		43,212	100.0

=== District 12 ===
In the 12th district, incumbent Democrat Alex Garza won re-election.

Democratic Primary
Party	Candidate	Votes	%
Democratic	Alex Garza (incumbent)	9,046	76.50
Democratic	Ed Martell	2,017	17.06
Democratic	Derrick A. Gyorkos	762	6.44
Total votes		11,825	100.0

Republican Primary
Party	Candidate	Votes	%
Republican	Michelle Bailey	4,273	100.0
Total votes		4,273	100.0

General Election
Party	Candidate	Votes	%
Democratic	Alex Garza (incumbent)	27,300	62.35
Republican	Michelle Bailey	16,488	37.65
Total votes		43,788	100.0

=== District 13 ===
In the 13th district, incumbent Democrat Frank Liberati was unable to run for re-election due to term limits.

Democratic Primary
Party	Candidate	Votes	%
Democratic	Tullio Liberati	4,997	41.39
Democratic	Bill Colovos	3,866	32.02
Democratic	Timothy O. Estheimer	3,209	26.58
Total votes		12,072	100.0

Republican Primary
Party	Candidate	Votes	%
Republican	Megan Frump	5,361	100.0
Total votes		5,361	100.0

General Election
Party	Candidate	Votes	%
Democratic	Tullio Liberati	26,720	57.99
Republican	Megan Frump	19,356	42.01
Total votes		46,076	100.0

=== District 14 ===
In the 14th district, incumbent Democrat Cara Clemente won re-election.

Democratic Primary
Party	Candidate	Votes	%
Democratic	Cara A. Clemente (incumbent)	8,836	85.15
Democratic	Senan Saleh	1,541	14.85
Total votes		10,377	100.0

Republican Primary
Party	Candidate	Votes	%
Republican	Darrell Stasik	4,572	100.0
Total votes		4,572	100.0

General Election
Party	Candidate	Votes	%
Democratic	Cara A. Clemente (incumbent)	23,096	56.66
Republican	Darrell Stasik	15,729	38.59
Working Class	Simone R. Coleman	1,937	4.75
Total votes		40,762	100.0

=== District 15 ===
Democratic Primary
Party	Candidate	Votes	%
Democratic	Abdullah Hammoud (incumbent)	10,289	99.99
Democratic	Kalette Shari Willis	1	0.01
Total votes		10,290	100.0

Republican Primary
Party	Candidate	Votes	%
Republican	Carla O'Neill	3,343	100.0
Total votes		3,343	100.0

General Election
Party	Candidate	Votes	%
Democratic	Abdullah Hammoud (incumbent)	28,362	70.49
Republican	Darrell Stasik	10,906	27.10
Working Class	Larry Darnell Betts	970	2.41
Total votes		40,238	100.0

=== District 16 ===
Democratic Primary
Party	Candidate	Votes	%
Democratic	Kevin Coleman (incumbent)	12,455	100.0
Total votes		12,455	100.0

Republican Primary
Party	Candidate	Votes	%
Republican	Emily Bauman	3,512	75.24
Republican	Josephine Brown	1,156	24.76
Total votes		4,668	100.0

General Election
Party	Candidate	Votes	%
Democratic	Kevin Coleman (incumbent)	28,225	62.50
Republican	Emily Bauman	16,937	37.50
Total votes		45,162	100.0

=== District 17 ===
Democratic Primary
Party	Candidate	Votes	%
Democratic	Christopher Slat	4,816	63.45
Democratic	Scott Crampton	2,774	36.55
Total votes		7,590	100.0

Republican Primary
Party	Candidate	Votes	%
Republican	Joe Bellino (incumbent)	8,064	100.0
Total votes		8,064	100.0

General Election
Party	Candidate	Votes	%
Republican	Joe Bellino (incumbent)	28,570	61.53
Democratic	Christopher Slat	17,866	38.47
Total votes		46,436	100.0

=== District 18 ===
Democratic Primary
Party	Candidate	Votes	%
Democratic	Kevin Hertel (incumbent)	9,715	72.62
Democratic	Christopher Jeffery	2,007	15.00
Democratic	Patrick Biange	1,655	12.37
Total votes		13,377	100.0

Republican Primary
Party	Candidate	Votes	%
Republican	Michael Babat	2,775	37.10
Republican	Christine Timmon	2,771	37.05
Republican	Brian K. Hakola	1,933	25.85
Total votes		7,479	100.0

General Election
Party	Candidate	Votes	%
Democratic	Kevin Hertel (incumbent)	32,569	60.27
Republican	Michael Babat	21,462	39.72
Write-in	Christine Timmon	7	0.01
Total votes		54,038	100.0

=== District 19 ===
Results by precinct Pohutsky: 50–60%; Ptashnik: 50–60%; 60–70%

In the 19th district, Democrat Laurie Pohutsky ran for re-election. Her Republican opponent was Martha Ptashnik. Pohutsky narrowly won re-election

Poll source	Date(s) administered	Sample size (Note: Key: A – all adults RV – registered voters LV – likely voters V – unclear)	Margin of error	Laurie Pohutsky (D)	Martha Ptashnik (R)
Mitchell Research & Communications/MIRS	September 14–18, 2020	≈300 (V)	± 5.6%	47%	45%

Democratic Primary
Party	Candidate	Votes	%
Democratic	Laurie Pohutsky (incumbent)	14,709	100.00
Total votes		14,709	100.0

Republican Primary
Party	Candidate	Votes	%
Republican	Martha Ptashnik	5,870	51.60
Republican	Penny Crider	4,856	42.68
Republican	Regina Gargus	651	5.72
Total votes		11,377	100.0

General Election
Party	Candidate	Votes	%
Democratic	Laurie Pohutsky (incumbent)	29,452	50.20
Republican	Martha Ptashnik	29,215	49.80
Total votes		58,667	100.0

=== District 20 ===
Democratic Primary
Party	Candidate	Votes	%
Democratic	Matt Koleszar (incumbent)	14,541	100.00
Total votes		14,541	100.0

Republican Primary
Party	Candidate	Votes	%
Republican	John Lacny	6,553	58.79
Republican	Laura Roush	4,594	41.21
Total votes		11,147	100.0

General Election
Party	Candidate	Votes	%
Democratic	Matt Koleszar (incumbent)	33,034	55.09
Republican	John Lacny	26,931	44.91
Total votes		59,965	100.0

=== District 21 ===
Democratic Primary
Party	Candidate	Votes	%
Democratic	Ranjeev Puri	12,222	69.98
Democratic	Ethan Petzold	5,243	30.02
Total votes		17,465	100.0

Republican Primary
Party	Candidate	Votes	%
Republican	Laurel Hess	3,446	46.34
Republican	James F. Chapman	1,243	16.72
Republican	James Nangle	998	13.42
Republican	Jessica Sohoza	978	13.15
Republican	Harold Bullock	771	10.37
Total votes		7,436	100.0

General Election
Party	Candidate	Votes	%
Democratic	Ranjeev Puri	34,284	59.15
Republican	Laurel Hess	23,682	40.85
Total votes		57,966	100.0

=== District 22 ===
Democratic Primary
Party	Candidate	Votes	%
Democratic	Richard Steenland	4,557	51.32
Democratic	Ryan Nelson	2,327	26.20
Democratic	Michael James Anderson	1,996	22.48
Total votes		8,880	100.0

Republican Primary
Party	Candidate	Votes	%
Republican	Steven G. Warner	2,667	51.14
Republican	Jeff Bonnell	2,548	48.86
Total votes		5,215	100.0

General Election
Party	Candidate	Votes	%
Democratic	Richard Steenland	24,954	59.91
Republican	Steven G. Warner	16,701	40.09
Total votes		41,655	100.0

=== District 23 ===
In the 23rd district, Democrat Darrin Camilleri won re-election. He was challenged by Republican nominee John Poe.

Democratic Primary
Party	Candidate	Votes	%
Democratic	Darrin Camilleri (incumbent)	12,363	100.0
Total votes		12,363	100.0

Republican Primary
Party	Candidate	Votes	%
Republican	John Poe	8,965	100.0
Total votes		8,965	100.0

General Election
Party	Candidate	Votes	%
Democratic	Darrin Camilleri (incumbent)	30,231	52.55
Republican	John Poe	27,300	47.45
Total votes		57,531	100.0

=== District 24 ===
Democratic Primary
Party	Candidate	Votes	%
Democratic	Michelle Woodman	6,093	65.69
Democratic	Alex Bronson	3,182	34.31
Total votes		9,275	100.0

Republican Primary
Party	Candidate	Votes	%
Republican	Steve Marino (incumbent)	9,861	83.70
Republican	William J. Revoir	1,920	16.30
Total votes		11,781	100.0

General Election
Party	Candidate	Votes	%
Republican	Steve Marino (incumbent)	29,394	57.54
Democratic	Michelle Woodman	21,692	42.46
Total votes		51,086	100.0

=== District 25 ===
In the 25th district, Democrat Nate Shannon won re-election. His Republican opponent was Paul Smith.

Poll source	Date(s) administered	Sample size	Margin of error	Nate Shannon (D)	Paul Smith (R)
Mitchell Research & Communications/MIRS	September 14–18, 2020	≈300 (V)	± 5.6%	48%	41%

Democratic Primary
Party	Candidate	Votes	%
Democratic	Nate Shannon (incumbent)	10,147	100.0
Total votes		10,147	100.0

Republican Primary
Party	Candidate	Votes	%
Republican	Paul M. Smith	3,060	36.90
Republican	Adam Wiley	2,681	32.33
Republican	Jazmine M. Early	2,552	30.77
Total votes		8,293	100.0

General Election
Party	Candidate	Votes	%
Democratic	Nate Shannon (incumbent)	25,239	52.86
Republican	Paul M. Smith	22,509	47.14
Total votes		47,748	100.0

=== District 26 ===
Democratic Primary
Party	Candidate	Votes	%
Democratic	Jim Ellison (incumbent)	15,630	100.0
Total votes		15,630	100.0

Republican Primary
Party	Candidate	Votes	%
Republican	Chris Meister	3,909	67.89
Republican	Barbara Barber	1,742	30.25
Republican	Robert Noble (write-in)	107	1.86
Total votes		5,758	100.0

General Election
Party	Candidate	Votes	%
Democratic	Jim Ellison (incumbent)	33,208	63.66
Republican	Chris Meister	18,955	36.34
Total votes		52,163	100.0

=== District 27 ===
Democratic Primary
Party	Candidate	Votes	%
Democratic	Regina Weiss	10,615	47.33
Democratic	Kevin Kresch	4,032	17.98
Democratic	Crystal Bailey	2,406	10.73
Democratic	Kelli N. Williams	2,337	10.42
Democratic	Matt Stoel	2,181	9.72
Democratic	Robert B. Lathrop	399	1.78
Democratic	Dan Tuck	239	1.07
Democratic	Martin C. Tutwiler	220	0.98
Total votes		22,429	100.0

Republican Primary
Party	Candidate	Votes	%
Republican	Elizabeth Goss	3,592	100.0
Total votes		3,592	100.0

General Election
Party	Candidate	Votes	%
Democratic	Regina Weiss	41,791	74.41
Republican	Elizabeth Goss	12,574	22.39
Libertarian	Gregory Scott Stempfle	913	1.63
Green	Sherry A. Wells	886	1.58
Total votes		56,164	100.0

=== District 28 ===
Democratic Primary
Party	Candidate	Votes	%
Democratic	Lori Stone (incumbent)	8,316	87.76
Democratic	William S. Massad	1,160	12.24
Total votes		9,476	100.0

Republican Primary
Party	Candidate	Votes	%
Republican	Stephen Colegio	3,120	64.09
Republican	Clifford Frost	1,748	35.91
Total votes		4,868	100.0

General Election
Party	Candidate	Votes	%
Democratic	Lori Stone (incumbent)	24,585	60.30
Republican	Stephen Colegio	15,329	37.60
Libertarian	Frederick Horndt	859	2.11
Total votes		40,773	100.0

=== District 29 ===
Democratic Primary
Party	Candidate	Votes	%
Democratic	Brenda Carter (incumbent)	10,908	100.0
Total votes		10,908	100.0

Republican Primary
Party	Candidate	Votes	%
Republican	S. Dave Sullivan	1,672	56.52
Republican	Vernon Molnar	1,286	43.48
Total votes		2,958	100.0

General Election
Party	Candidate	Votes	%
Democratic	Brenda Carter (incumbent)	27,099	72.89
Republican	S. Dave Sullivan	10,079	27.11
Total votes		37,178	100.0

=== District 30 ===
Democratic Primary
Party	Candidate	Votes	%
Democratic	Michael A. Chehab	6,770	100.0
Total votes		6,770	100.0

Republican Primary
Party	Candidate	Votes	%
Republican	Diana Farrington (incumbent)	8,354	100.0
Total votes		8,354	100.0

General Election
Party	Candidate	Votes	%
Republican	Diana Farrington (incumbent)	28,199	62.37
Democratic	Michael A. Chehab	17,016	37.63
Total votes		45,215	100.0

=== District 31 ===
Democratic Primary
Party	Candidate	Votes	%
Democratic	William Sowerby (incumbent)	6,300	57.35
Democratic	Michelle Robertson	4,685	42.65
Total votes		10,985	100.0

Republican Primary
Party	Candidate	Votes	%
Republican	Lisa Valerio-Nowc	4,338	60.12
Republican	Austin James Negipe	2,878	39.88
Total votes		7,216	100.0

General Election
Party	Candidate	Votes	%
Democratic	William Sowerby (incumbent)	26,202	56.27
Republican	Lisa Valerio-Nowc	20,364	43.73
Total votes		46,566	100.0

=== District 32 ===
Democratic Primary
Party	Candidate	Votes	%
Democratic	Justin Boucher	6,857	100.0
Total votes		6,857	100.0

Republican Primary
Party	Candidate	Votes	%
Republican	Pamela Hornberger (incumbent)	7,948	63.88
Republican	Brandon J. Mikula	4,495	36.12
Total votes		12,443	100.0

General Election
Party	Candidate	Votes	%
Republican	Pamela Hornberger (incumbent)	33,393	66.15
Democratic	Justin Boucher	17,090	33.85
Total votes		50,483	100.0

=== District 33 ===
Democratic Primary
Party	Candidate	Votes	%
Democratic	Olu Jabari	7,104	100.0
Total votes		7,104	100.0

Republican Primary
Party	Candidate	Votes	%
Republican	Jeffrey Yaroch (incumbent)	13,557	100.0
Total votes		13,557	100.0

General Election
Party	Candidate	Votes	%
Republican	Jeffrey Yaroch (incumbent)	39,429	70.45
Democratic	Olu Jabari	16,538	29.55
Total votes		55,967	100.0

=== District 34 ===
Democratic Primary
Party	Candidate	Votes	%
Democratic	Cynthia Neeley (incumbent)	7,281	67.35
Democratic	Arthur Woodson	1,360	12.58
Democratic	Claudia Perkins-Milton	1,202	11.12
Democratic	DelTonya Burns	514	4.75
Democratic	Diana A. Phillips	454	4.20
Total votes		10,811	100.0

Republican Primary
Party	Candidate	Votes	%
Republican	James Miraglia	612	100.0
Total votes		612	100.0

General Election
Party	Candidate	Votes	%
Democratic	Cynthia Neeley (incumbent)	24,030	86.71
Republican	James Miraglia	3,684	13.29
Total votes		27,714	100.0

=== District 35 ===
Democratic Primary
Party	Candidate	Votes	%
Democratic	Kyra Harris Bolden (incumbent)	23,737	90.21
Democratic	Shadia Martini	2,577	9.79
Total votes		26,314	100.0

Republican Primary
Party	Candidate	Votes	%
Republican	Daniela Davis	2,946	100.0
Total votes		2,946	100.0

General Election
Party	Candidate	Votes	%
Democratic	Kyra Harris Bolden (incumbent)	49,096	82.93
Republican	Daniela Davis	9,412	15.90
Libertarian	Tim Yow	693	1.17
Total votes		59,201	100.0

=== District 36 ===
Democratic Primary
Party	Candidate	Votes	%
Democratic	Robert Murphy	5,949	100.0
Total votes		5,949	100.0

Republican Primary
Party	Candidate	Votes	%
Republican	Doug Wozniak (incumbent)	15,628	100.0
Total votes		15,628	100.0

General Election
Party	Candidate	Votes	%
Republican	Doug Wozniak (incumbent)	37,945	68.69
Democratic	Robert Murphy	17,299	31.31
Total votes		55,244	100.0

=== District 37 ===
Democratic Primary
Party	Candidate	Votes	%
Democratic	Samantha Steckloff	8,994	48.77
Democratic	Michael Bridges	5,635	30.55
Democratic	Randy Bruce	3,814	20.68
Total votes		18,443	100.0

Republican Primary
Party	Candidate	Votes	%
Republican	Mitch Swoboda	6,669	100.0
Total votes		6,669	100.0

General Election
Party	Candidate	Votes	%
Democratic	Samantha Steckloff	34,590	63.88
Republican	Mitch Swoboda	18,464	34.10
Libertarian	James K. Young	1,092	2.02
Total votes		54,146	100.0

=== District 38 ===
In the 38th district, incumbent Republican Kathy Crawford was prevented from running for re-election due to term limits. Kelly Breen was elected as a Democrat in this Republican district.

Democratic Primary
Party	Candidate	Votes	%
Democratic	Kelly Breen	7,051	50.52
Democratic	Megan McAllister	6,907	49.48
Total votes		13,958	100.0

Republican Primary
Party	Candidate	Votes	%
Republican	Chase Turner	7,301	61.86
Republican	Sreenivas Cherukuri	2,730	23.13
Republican	Krista Spencer	1,771	15.01
Total votes		11,802	100.0

General Election
Party	Candidate	Votes	%
Democratic	Kelly Breen	31,217	51.62
Republican	Chase Turner	29,263	48.38
Total votes		60,480	100.0

=== District 39 ===
In the 39th district, incumbent Republican Ryan Berman won re-election.

Poll source	Date(s) administered	Sample size	Margin of error	Ryan Berman (R)	Julia Pulver (D)	Anthony Croff (L)
Mitchell Research & Communications/MIRS	September 14–18, 2020	≈300 (V)	± 5.6%	43%	47%	2%

Hypothetical polling

Generic Democrat vs Generic Republican

Poll source	Date(s) administered	Sample size	Margin of error	Generic Republican	Generic Democrat	Undecided
Public Policy Polling/DLCC (Note: The DLCC exclusively supports Democratic candidates)	September 23–24, 2020	463 (V)	± 4.6%	45%	48%	7%

Democratic Primary
Party	Candidate	Votes	%
Democratic	Julia Pulver	12,597	100.0
Total votes		12,597	100.0

Republican Primary
Party	Candidate	Votes	%
Republican	Ryan Berman (incumbent)	9,773	100.0
Total votes		9,773	100.0

General Election
Party	Candidate	Votes	%
Republican	Ryan Berman (incumbent)	30,754	51.91
Democratic	Julia Pulver	27,561	46.52
Libertarian	Anthony Croff	927	1.56
Total votes		59,242	100.0

=== District 40 ===
Democratic Primary
Party	Candidate	Votes	%
Democratic	Mari Manoogian (incumbent)	18,862	100.0
Total votes		18,862	100.0

Republican Primary
Party	Candidate	Votes	%
Republican	Kendra Cleary	10,685	100.0
Total votes		10,685	100.0

General Election
Party	Candidate	Votes	%
Democratic	Mari Manoogian (incumbent)	38,162	57.77
Republican	Kendra Cleary	27,897	42.23
Total votes		66,059	100.0

=== District 41 ===
Democratic Primary
Party	Candidate	Votes	%
Democratic	Padma Kuppa (incumbent)	13,793	100.0
Total votes		13,793	100.0

Republican Primary
Party	Candidate	Votes	%
Republican	Andrew J. Sosnoski	4,952	51.20
Republican	Evan Agnello	4,720	48.80
Total votes		9,672	100.0

General Election
Party	Candidate	Votes	%
Democratic	Padma Kuppa (incumbent)	30,601	55.04
Republican	Andrew J. Sosnoski	24,992	44.96
Total votes		55,593	100.0

=== District 42 ===
Democratic Primary
Party	Candidate	Votes	%
Democratic	Donnie Bettes	10,150	100.0
Total votes		10,150	100.0

Republican Primary
Party	Candidate	Votes	%
Republican	Ann Bollin (incumbent)	15,684	100.0
Total votes		15,684	100.0

General Election
Party	Candidate	Votes	%
Republican	Ann Bollin (incumbent)	39,730	63.21
Democratic	Donnie Bettes	23,123	36.79
Total votes		62,853	100.0

=== District 43 ===
Democratic Primary
Party	Candidate	Votes	%
Democratic	Nicole Breadon	10,311	100.0
Total votes		10,311	100.0

Republican Primary
Party	Candidate	Votes	%
Republican	Andrea Schroeder (incumbent)	12,494	100.0
Total votes		12,494	100.0

General Election
Party	Candidate	Votes	%
Republican	Andrea Schroeder (incumbent)	33,405	59.65
Democratic	Nicole Breadon	22,596	40.35
Total votes		56,001	100.0

=== District 44 ===
Democratic Primary
Party	Candidate	Votes	%
Democratic	Denise Forrest	9,208	100.0
Total votes		9,208	100.0

Republican Primary
Party	Candidate	Votes	%
Republican	Matt Maddock (incumbent)	14,531	100.0
Total votes		14,531	100.0

General Election
Party	Candidate	Votes	%
Republican	Matt Maddock (incumbent)	35,416	59.54
Democratic	Denise Forrest	24,067	40.46
Total votes		59,483	100.0

=== District 45 ===
In the 45th district, incumbent Republican Michael Webber could not run for re-election due to term-limits.

Poll source	Date(s) administered	Sample size	Margin of error	Mark Tisdell (R)	Barb Anness (D)
Mitchell Research & Communications/MIRS	September 14–18, 2020	≈300 (V)	± 5.6%	44%	45%

Democratic Primary
Party	Candidate	Votes	%
Democratic	Barb Anness	7,314	56.92
Democratic	Brendan Johnson	5,535	43.08
Total votes		12,849	100.0

Republican Primary
Party	Candidate	Votes	%
Republican	Mark Tisdel	10,831	100.0
Total votes		10,831	100.0

General Election
Party	Candidate	Votes	%
Republican	Mark Tisdel	29,227	52.35
Democratic	Barb Anness	26,604	47.65
Total votes		55,831	100.0

=== District 46 ===
Democratic Primary
Party	Candidate	Votes	%
Democratic	Jody LaMacchia	8,934	100.0
Total votes		8,934	100.0

Republican Primary
Party	Candidate	Votes	%
Republican	John Reilly (incumbent)	13,683	100.0
Total votes		13,683	100.0

General Election
Party	Candidate	Votes	%
Republican	John Reilly (incumbent)	36,259	62.01
Democratic	Jody LaMacchia	22,214	37.99
Total votes		58,473	100.0

=== District 47 ===
Democratic Primary
Party	Candidate	Votes	%
Democratic	Adam Smiddy	7,066	100.0
Total votes		7,066	100.0

Republican Primary
Party	Candidate	Votes	%
Republican	Bob Bezotte	9,587	53.62
Republican	Meghan Reckling	7,243	40.51
Republican	Yvonne Black	2.96	530
Republican	Zachary Dyba	2.90	518
Total votes		17,878	100.0

General Election
Party	Candidate	Votes	%
Republican	Bob Bezotte	40,449	68.73
Democratic	Adam Smiddy	18,407	31.27
Total votes		58,856	100.0

Results by precinct Martin: 50–60%; 60–70%; Kennedy: 50–60%; 80–90%

=== District 48 ===
Democratic Primary
Party	Candidate	Votes	%
Democratic	Sheryl Kennedy (incumbent)	10,824	91.16
Democratic	Andalib Odulate	1,050	8.84
Total votes		11,874	100.0

Republican Primary
Party	Candidate	Votes	%
Republican	David Martin	4,226	65.04
Republican	Sherri J. Cross	2,272	34.96
Total votes		6,498	100.0

General Election
Party	Candidate	Votes	%
Republican	David Martin	24,796	50.50
Democratic	Sheryl Kennedy (incumbent)	24,307	49.50
Total votes		49,103	100.0

=== District 49 ===
Democratic Primary
Party	Candidate	Votes	%
Democratic	John Daniel Cherry (incumbent)	13,321	100.0
Total votes		13,321	100.0

Republican Primary
Party	Candidate	Votes	%
Republican	Bryan Lutz	3,018	100.0
Total votes		3,018	100.0

General Election
Party	Candidate	Votes	%
Democratic	John Daniel Cherry (incumbent)	28,122	68.87
Republican	Bryan Lutz	12,711	31.13
Total votes		40,833	100.0

=== District 50 ===
Democratic Primary
Party	Candidate	Votes	%
Democratic	Tim Sneller (incumbent)	9,741	78.86
Democratic	Raymond Freiberger	2,612	21.14
Total votes		12,353	100.0

Republican Primary
Party	Candidate	Votes	%
Republican	Christina Fitchett-Hickson	2,446	39.41
Republican	Lynne Freiberger	2,191	35.30
Republican	Lynn S. Hukee	1,570	25.29
Total votes		6,207	100.0

General Election
Party	Candidate	Votes	%
Democratic	Tim Sneller (incumbent)	27,860	54.24
Republican	Christina Fitchett-Hickson	23,507	45.76
Total votes		51,367	100.0

=== District 51 ===
On August 4, 2020, the primary elections occurred. Incumbent Republican Mike Mueller ran unopposed. Brad May, a mental health clinician, was nominated on the Democratic ticket. In the primary, May defeated Conner Wallace. Wallace later endorsed May's candidacy.

On September 18, 2020, the Michigan Republican Party pointed to May's criminal record, which included conviction for robbery, possession of cocaine, and retail fraud. The state Republican Party criticized the Michigan Education Association for endorsing him, despite his criminal past. May responded to these allegations. He confirmed that they were true, but also claimed that he had made significant improvements to his life since his convictions, and that through his work as a clinician, has been able to help those who had been in a similar position to himself.

In the general election on November 3, 2020, Mueller was re-elected, defeating May.

Democratic Primary
Party	Candidate	Votes	%
Democratic	Brad May	5,203	55.86
Democratic	Conner Wallace	4,111	44.14
Total votes		9,314	100.0

Republican Primary
Party	Candidate	Votes	%
Republican	Mike Mueller (incumbent)	11,667	100.0
Total votes		11,667	100.0

General Election
Party	Candidate	Votes	%
Republican	Mike Mueller (incumbent)	38,154	64.40
Democratic	Brad May	21,087	35.60
Total votes		59,241	100.0

=== District 52 ===
Democratic Primary
Party	Candidate	Votes	%
Democratic	Donna Lasinski (incumbent)	18,794	100.0
Total votes		18,794	100.0

Republican Primary
Party	Candidate	Votes	%
Republican	Greg Marquis	4,847	54.19
Republican	Melanie Weidmayer	4,097	45.81
Total votes		8,944	100.0

General Election
Party	Candidate	Votes	%
Democratic	Donna Lasinski (incumbent)	35,985	58.99
Republican	Greg Marquis	25,022	41.01
Total votes		61,007	100.0

=== District 53 ===
Democratic Primary
Party	Candidate	Votes	%
Democratic	Yousef Rabhi (incumbent)	21,137	91.15
Democratic	Sam Larson	2,051	8.85
Total votes		23,188	100.0

Republican Primary
Party	Candidate	Votes	%
Republican	Jean E. Holland	1,015	100.0
Total votes		1,015	100.0

General Election
Party	Candidate	Votes	%
Democratic	Yousef Rabhi (incumbent)	42,524	86.85
Republican	Jean E. Holland	6,436	13.15
Total votes		48,960	100.0

=== District 54 ===
Democratic Primary
Party	Candidate	Votes	%
Democratic	Ronnie Peterson (incumbent)	17,140	100.0
Total votes		17,140	100.0

Republican Primary
Party	Candidate	Votes	%
Republican	Martin A. Church	2,566	100.0
Total votes		2,566	100.0

General Election
Party	Candidate	Votes	%
Democratic	Ronnie Peterson (incumbent)	36,533	77.73
Republican	Martin A. Church	10,464	22.27
Total votes		46,997	100.0

=== District 55 ===
Democratic Primary
Party	Candidate	Votes	%
Democratic	Felicia Brabec	17,871	87.21
Democratic	Stephen Kurant	2,622	12.79
Total votes		20,493	100.0

Republican Primary
Party	Candidate	Votes	%
Republican	Bob Baird	3,874	100.0
Total votes		3,874	100.0

General Election
Party	Candidate	Votes	%
Democratic	Felicia Brabec	37,118	72.37
Republican	Bob Baird	14,170	27.63
Total votes		51,288	100.0

=== District 56 ===
Democratic Primary
Party	Candidate	Votes	%
Democratic	Keith W. Kitchens	3,505	51.57
Democratic	Ernie Whiteside	3,291	48.43
Total votes		6,796	100.0

Republican Primary
Party	Candidate	Votes	%
Republican	TC Clements	7,927	72.80
Republican	Austin Blaine	2,962	27.20
Total votes		10,889	100.0

General Election
Party	Candidate	Votes	%
Republican	TC Clements	31,325	64.20
Democratic	Keith W. Kitchens	16,478	33.77
Green	Jeffrey Jon Rubley II	993	2.04
Total votes		48,796	100.0

=== District 57 ===
Democratic Primary
Party	Candidate	Votes	%
Democratic	Will Garcia	3,631	64.43
Democratic	Jesse Ryan Reynolds	2,005	35.57
Total votes		5,636	100.0

Republican Primary
Party	Candidate	Votes	%
Republican	Bronna Kahle (incumbent)	10,256	100.0
Total votes		10,256	100.0

General Election
Party	Candidate	Votes	%
Republican	Bronna Kahle (incumbent)	32,093	66.39
Democratic	Will Garcia	16,249	33.61
Total votes		48,342	100.0

=== District 58 ===
Democratic Primary
Party	Candidate	Votes	%
Democratic	Tamara C. Barnes	2,626	85.07
Democratic	Steven Sowards	461	14.93
Total votes		3,087	100.0

Republican Primary
Party	Candidate	Votes	%
Republican	Andrew Fink	6,520	38.62
Republican	Andy Welden	4,310	25.53
Republican	Daren Wiseley	3,126	18.52
Republican	Adam Stockford	2,925	17.33
Total votes		16,881	100.0

General Election
Party	Candidate	Votes	%
Republican	Andrew Fink	30,208	71.22
Democratic	Tamara C. Barnes	12,208	28.78
Total votes		42,416	100.0

=== District 59 ===
Democratic Primary
Party	Candidate	Votes	%
Democratic	Amy L. East	4,219	100.0
Total votes		4,219	100.0

Republican Primary
Party	Candidate	Votes	%
Republican	Steve Carra	5,003	37.28
Republican	Jack Coleman	3,136	23.37
Republican	Larry Walton	2,390	17.81
Republican	Allen J. Balog	2,077	15.48
Republican	Daniel Hinkle	814	6.07
Total votes		13,420	100.0

General Election
Party	Candidate	Votes	%
Republican	Steve Carra	26,561	62.85
Democratic	Amy L. East	14,802	35.02
Write-in	Jack Daniel Coleman	901	2.13
Total votes		42,264	100.0

=== District 60 ===
Democratic Primary
Party	Candidate	Votes	%
Democratic	Julie Rogers	7,176	51.49
Democratic	Stephanie Moore	6,760	48.51
Total votes		13,936	100.0

Republican Primary
Party	Candidate	Votes	%
Republican	Gary Mitchell	3,029	100.0
Total votes		3,029	100.0

General Election
Party	Candidate	Votes	%
Democratic	Julie Rogers	30,037	71.41
Republican	Gary Mitchell	10,043	23.88
Write-in	Stephanie L. Moore	1,980	4.71
Total votes		42,060	100.0

=== District 61 ===
Results by precinct Morse: 50–60%; 60–70%; 70–80%; Haltom: 50–60%; 60–70%

Incumbent Republican Brandt Iden was term limited, which made the 61st district an open seat. The primaries occurred on August 4 and decided that Republican nominee Bronwyn Haltom was to run against incumbent Kalamazoo County Commissioner, Christine Morse, as the Democratic nominee. Morse won the seat.

Poll source	Date(s) administered	Sample size	Margin of error	Branwyn Haltom (R)	Christine Morris (D)
Mitchell Research & Communications/MIRS	September 14–18, 2020	≈300 (V)	± 5.6%	41%	45%

Hypothetical polling

Generic Democrat vs Generic Republican

Poll source	Date(s) administered	Sample size	Margin of error	Generic Republican	Generic Democrat	Undecided
Public Policy Polling/DLCC	September 23–24, 2020	532 (V)	± 4.3%	43%	48%	8%

Democratic Primary
Party	Candidate	Votes	%
Democratic	Christine Morse	13,380	100.0
Total votes		13,380	100.0

Republican Primary
Party	Candidate	Votes	%
Republican	Bronwyn Haltom	6,634	65.46
Republican	Tom Graham	3,501	34.54
Total votes		10,135	100.0

General Election
Party	Candidate	Votes	%
Democratic	Christine Morse	31,888	54.07
Republican	Bronwyn Haltom	27,088	45.93
Total votes		58,976	100.0

=== District 62 ===
Incumbent Democrat Jim Haadsma won re-election in the 62nd district against Republican nominee Dave Morgan.

Poll source	Date(s) administered	Sample size	Margin of error	Jim Haadsma (D)	Dave Morgan (R)
Mitchell Research & Communications/MIRS	September 14–18, 2020	≈300 (V)	± 5.6%	52%	39%

Democratic Primary
Party	Candidate	Votes	%
Democratic	Jim Haadsma (incumbent)	7,074	100.0
Total votes		7,074	100.0

Republican Primary
Party	Candidate	Votes	%
Republican	Dave Morgan	5,013	72.43
Republican	Michelle Gregoire	1,365	19.72
Republican	Chad Baase	543	7.85
Total votes		6,921	100.0

General Election
Party	Candidate	Votes	%
Democratic	Jim Haadsma (incumbent)	20,989	51.32
Republican	Dave Morgan	19,909	48.68
Total votes		40,898	100.0

=== District 63 ===
Democratic Primary
Party	Candidate	Votes	%
Democratic	Luke Howell	3,744	50.49
Democratic	Ron Hawkins	3,671	49.51
Total votes		7,415	100.0

Republican Primary
Party	Candidate	Votes	%
Republican	Matt Hall (incumbent)	11,912	100.0
Total votes		11,912	100.0

General Election
Party	Candidate	Votes	%
Republican	Matt Hall (incumbent)	31,379	60.63
Democratic	Luke Howell	18,613	35.97
Libertarian	Rafael Wolf	1,093	2.11
Green	John Anthony La Pietra	660	1.28
Write-in	Ronald Lee Hawkins	6	0.01
Total votes		51,751	100.0

=== District 64 ===
Democratic Primary
Party	Candidate	Votes	%
Democratic	Sandra Hofman-Kingston	5,372	100.0
Total votes		5,372	100.0

Republican Primary
Party	Candidate	Votes	%
Republican	Julie Alexander	9,427	100.0
Total votes		9,427	100.0

General Election
Party	Candidate	Votes	%
Republican	Julie Alexander	24,880	60.57
Democratic	Sandra Hofman-Kingston	15,125	36.82
Libertarian	Norman Peterson	1,071	2.61
Total votes		41,076	100.0

=== District 65 ===
Democratic Primary
Party	Candidate	Votes	%
Democratic	Nancy Smith	5,015	80.18
Democratic	Dave Rowland	1,240	19.82
Total votes		6,255	100.0

Republican Primary
Party	Candidate	Votes	%
Republican	Sarah Lightner (incumbent)	11,403	100.0
Total votes		11,403	100.0

General Election
Party	Candidate	Votes	%
Republican	Sarah Lightner (incumbent)	31,444	64.75
Democratic	Nancy Smith	17,116	35.25
Total votes		48,560	100.0

=== District 66 ===
In the 66th district, Republican Beth Griffin won reelection.

Poll source	Date(s) administered	Sample size	Margin of error	Beth Griffin (R)	Abigail Wheeler (D)
Practical Political Consulting/Abigail Wheeler (Note: Poll sponsored by Wheeler's campaign)	Released Jul 10, 2020	– (Note: Not yet released)	–	53%	47%

Democratic Primary
Party	Candidate	Votes	%
Democratic	Abigail Wheeler	6,886	100.0
Total votes		6,886	100.0

Republican Primary
Party	Candidate	Votes	%
Republican	Beth Griffin (incumbent)	9,774	100.0
Total votes		9,774	100.0

General Election
Party	Candidate	Votes	%
Republican	Beth Griffin (incumbent)	28,270	59.30
Democratic	Abigail Wheeler	19,403	40.70
Total votes		47,673	100.0

=== District 67 ===
Democratic Primary
Party	Candidate	Votes	%
Democratic	Kara Hope (incumbent)	12,477	100.0
Total votes		12,477	100.0

Republican Primary
Party	Candidate	Votes	%
Republican	Nate J. Ross	5,390	65.35
Republican	Clyde L. Thomas	2,858	34.65
Total votes		8,248	100.0

General Election
Party	Candidate	Votes	%
Democratic	Kara Hope (incumbent)	28,503	54.34
Republican	Nate J. Ross	23,951	45.66
Total votes		52,454	100.0

=== District 68 ===
Democratic Primary
Party	Candidate	Votes	%
Democratic	Sarah Anthony (incumbent)	14,686	100.0
Total votes		14,686	100.0

Republican Primary
Party	Candidate	Votes	%
Republican	Robert J. Atkinson	3,306	100.0
Total votes		3,306	100.0

General Election
Party	Candidate	Votes	%
Democratic	Sarah Anthony (incumbent)	33,760	75.91
Republican	Robert J. Atkinson	10,714	24.09
Total votes		44,474	100.0

=== District 69 ===
Democratic Primary
Party	Candidate	Votes	%
Democratic	Julie Brixie (incumbent)	15,491	100.0
Total votes		15,491	100.0

Republican Primary
Party	Candidate	Votes	%
Republican	Grace S. Norris	4,398	100.0
Total votes		4,398	100.0

General Election
Party	Candidate	Votes	%
Democratic	Julie Brixie (incumbent)	30,083	69.29
Republican	Grace S. Norris	12,654	29.15
Green	Gene Gutierrez	680	1.57
Total votes		43,417	100.0

=== District 70 ===
Democratic Primary
Party	Candidate	Votes	%
Democratic	Karen Garvey	4,098	100.0
Total votes		4,098	100.0

Republican Primary
Party	Candidate	Votes	%
Republican	Pat Outman	7,387	56.74
Republican	Martin Ross	2,836	21.78
Republican	Arturo Puckerin	1,228	9.43
Republican	Greg Alexander	948	7.28
Republican	Christopher Comden	620	4.76
Total votes		13,019	100.0

General Election
Party	Candidate	Votes	%
Republican	Pat Outman	27,489	68.88
Democratic	Karen Garvey	12,419	31.12
Total votes		39,908	100.0

=== District 71 ===
In Michigan's 71st House of Representatives district, Democrat Angela Witwer was re-elected.

Democratic Primary
Party	Candidate	Votes	%
Democratic	Angela Witwer (incumbent)	11,796	100.0
Total votes		11,796	100.0

Republican Primary
Party	Candidate	Votes	%
Republican	Gina Johnsen	5,390	51.31
Republican	Christine Barnes	5,115	48.69
Total votes		10,505	100.0

General Election
Party	Candidate	Votes	%
Democratic	Angela Witwer (incumbent)	28,200	51.22
Republican	Gina Johnsen	26,049	47.31
Green	Dalton R. McCuiston	807	1.47
Total votes		55,056	100.0

=== District 72 ===
Democratic Primary
Party	Candidate	Votes	%
Democratic	Lily Cheng-Schulting	5,475	63.08
Democratic	Cade Wilson	3,205	36.92
Total votes		8,680	100.0

Republican Primary
Party	Candidate	Votes	%
Republican	Steve Johnson (incumbent)	11,311	100.0
Total votes		11,311	100.0

General Election
Party	Candidate	Votes	%
Republican	Steve Johnson (incumbent)	29,614	55.06
Democratic	Lily Cheng-Schulting	24,170	44.94
Total votes		53,784	100.0

=== District 73 ===
Poll source	Date(s) administered	Sample size	Margin of error	Brian Posthumus (R)	Bill Saxton (D)
Target Insyght/MIRS News	Oct 20–22, 2020	300 (V)	± 5.7%	41%	40%

Democratic Primary
Party	Candidate	Votes	%
Democratic	Bill Saxton	10,517	100.0
Total votes		10,517	100.0

Republican Primary
Party	Candidate	Votes	%
Republican	Bryan Posthumus	7,853	46.10
Republican	John Inhulsen	4,941	29.01
Republican	Robert Regan	4,239	24.89
Total votes		17,033	100.0

General Election
Party	Candidate	Votes	%
Republican	Bryan Posthumus	37,137	56.96
Democratic	Bill Saxton	27,178	41.69
Constitution	Theodore Gerrard	877	1.35
Write-in	Ronald Lee Heeren	1	0.00
Total votes		65,193	100.0

=== District 74 ===
Democratic Primary
Party	Candidate	Votes	%
Democratic	Meagan L. Hintz	7,130	100.0
Total votes		7,130	100.0

Republican Primary
Party	Candidate	Votes	%
Republican	Mark Huizenga (incumbent)	11,609	88.31
Republican	Brock Story	1,537	11.69
Total votes		13,146	100.0

General Election
Party	Candidate	Votes	%
Republican	Mark Huizenga (incumbent)	34,068	63.13
Democratic	Meagan L. Hintz	19,897	36.87
Total votes		53,965	100.0

=== District 75 ===
Democratic Primary
Party	Candidate	Votes	%
Democratic	David LaGrand (incumbent)	10,667	100.0
Total votes		10,667	100.0

Republican Primary
Party	Candidate	Votes	%
Republican	James McKeiver	2,521	100.0
Total votes		2,521	100.0

General Election
Party	Candidate	Votes	%
Democratic	David LaGrand (incumbent)	30,423	74.62
Republican	James McKeiver	8,315	20.39
Working Class	Louis Palus	1,234	3.03
Green	Marco T. Bulnes	798	1.96
Total votes		40,770	100.0

=== District 76 ===
Democratic Primary
Party	Candidate	Votes	%
Democratic	Rachel Hood (incumbent)	13,763	100.0
Total votes		13,763	100.0

Republican Primary
Party	Candidate	Votes	%
Republican	Doug Zandstra	8,243	100.0
Total votes		8,243	100.0

General Election
Party	Candidate	Votes	%
Democratic	Rachel Hood (incumbent)	33,887	62.76
Republican	Doug Zandstra	20,111	37.24
Total votes		53,998	100.0

=== District 77 ===
Democratic Primary
Party	Candidate	Votes	%
Democratic	Bob Smith	6,456	100.0
Total votes		6,456	100.0

Republican Primary
Party	Candidate	Votes	%
Republican	Tommy Brann (incumbent)	10,576	100.0
Total votes		10,576	100.0

General Election
Party	Candidate	Votes	%
Republican	Tommy Brann (incumbent)	30,215	59.94
Democratic	Bob Smith	20,195	40.06
Total votes		50,410	100.0

=== District 78 ===
Democratic Primary
Party	Candidate	Votes	%
Democratic	Dan VandenHeede	5,768	100.0
Total votes		5,768	100.0

Republican Primary
Party	Candidate	Votes	%
Republican	Brad Paquette (incumbent)	10,208	100.0
Total votes		10,208	100.0

General Election
Party	Candidate	Votes	%
Republican	Brad Paquette (incumbent)	28,485	62.71
Democratic	Dan VandenHeede	16,297	35.88
Natural Law	Andrew J. Warner	638	1.40
Total votes		45,420	100.0

=== District 79 ===
In the 79th district Pauline Wendzel won re-election.

Poll source	Date(s) administered	Sample size	Margin of error	Pauline Wendzel (R)	Chokwe Pitchford (D)
Chokwe Pitchford (Note: Poll conducted by Pitchford's campaign)	Released Jul 6, 2020	–	–	49%	51%

Democratic Primary
Party	Candidate	Votes	%
Democratic	Chokwe Pitchford	6,611	100.0
Total votes		6,611	100.0

Republican Primary
Party	Candidate	Votes	%
Republican	Pauline Wendzel (incumbent)	10,076	82.45
Republican	Jacquie Gnodtke Blackwell	2,145	17.55
Total votes		12,221	100.0

General Election
Party	Candidate	Votes	%
Republican	Pauline Wendzel (incumbent)	25,656	56.62
Democratic	Chokwe Pitchford	19,658	43.38
Total votes		45,314	100.0

=== District 80 ===
Democratic Primary
Party	Candidate	Votes	%
Democratic	Erik Almquist	6,589	100.0
Total votes		6,589	100.0

Republican Primary
Party	Candidate	Votes	%
Republican	Mary Whiteford (incumbent)	11,505	81.26
Republican	Nevin P. Cooper-Keel	2,653	18.74
Total votes		14,158	100.0

General Election
Party	Candidate	Votes	%
Republican	Mary Whiteford (incumbent)	34,999	66.49
Democratic	Erik Almquist	17,637	33.51
Total votes		52,636	100.0

=== District 81 ===
Democratic Primary
Party	Candidate	Votes	%
Democratic	Debbie Bourgois	6,056	100.0
Total votes		6,056	100.0

Republican Primary
Party	Candidate	Votes	%
Republican	Gary Eisen (incumbent)	10,276	72.29
Republican	John W. Mahaney	3,938	27.71
Total votes		14,214	100.0

General Election
Party	Candidate	Votes	%
Republican	Gary Eisen (incumbent)	33,241	68.49
Democratic	Debbie Bourgois	15,290	31.51
Total votes		48,531	100.0

=== District 82 ===
Democratic Primary
Party	Candidate	Votes	%
Democratic	Jerry Tkach	2,603	50.77
Democratic	Kurt Hausauer	2,524	49.23
Total votes		5,127	100.0

Republican Primary
Party	Candidate	Votes	%
Republican	Gary Howell (incumbent)	16,210	100.0
Total votes		16,210	100.0

General Election
Party	Candidate	Votes	%
Republican	Gary Howell (incumbent)	37,018	73.09
Democratic	Jerry Tkach	13,616	26.88
Write-in	Kurt Allan Hausauer	15	0.03
Total votes		50,649	100.0

=== District 83 ===
Democratic Primary
Party	Candidate	Votes	%
Democratic	Stephanie Armstrong-Helton	5,257	100.0
Total votes		5,257	100.0

Republican Primary
Party	Candidate	Votes	%
Republican	Andrew Beeler	5,661	35.89
Republican	Gregory L. Alexander	4,461	28.28
Republican	Tim Keller	3,166	20.07
Republican	Joseph M. O'Mara	2,216	14.05
Republican	Charles Richard Armstrong II	1.71	269
Total votes		15,773	100.0

General Election
Party	Candidate	Votes	%
Republican	Andrew Beeler	28,270	65.50
Democratic	Stephanie Armstrong-Helton	14,888	34.50
Total votes		43,158	100.0

=== District 84 ===
Democratic Primary
Party	Candidate	Votes	%
Democratic	Patrick J. Wood	3,016	61.74
Democratic	Douglas P. Marker	1,869	38.26
Total votes		4,885	100.0

Republican Primary
Party	Candidate	Votes	%
Republican	Phil Green (incumbent)	13,479	100.0
Total votes		13,479	100.0

General Election
Party	Candidate	Votes	%
Republican	Phil Green (incumbent)	33,473	72.16
Democratic	Patrick J. Wood	12,913	27.84
Total votes		46,386	100.0

=== District 85 ===
Democratic Primary
Party	Candidate	Votes	%
Democratic	Andrea Kelly Garrison	7,775	100.0
Total votes		7,775	100.0

Republican Primary
Party	Candidate	Votes	%
Republican	Ben Frederick (incumbent)	10,685	100.0
Total votes		10,685	100.0

General Election
Party	Candidate	Votes	%
Republican	Ben Frederick (incumbent)	32,833	65.24
Democratic	Andrea Kelly Garrison	17,494	34.76
Total votes		50,327	100.0

=== District 86 ===
Democratic Primary
Party	Candidate	Votes	%
Democratic	Sue Hayes	4,512	61.28
Democratic	Jeff Merritt	2,851	38.72
Total votes		7,363	100.0

Republican Primary
Party	Candidate	Votes	%
Republican	Thomas Albert (incumbent)	15,483	100.0
Total votes		15,483	100.0

General Election
Party	Candidate	Votes	%
Republican	Thomas Albert (incumbent)	35,536	63.13
Democratic	Sue Hayes	20,750	36.87
Total votes		56,286	100.0

=== District 87 ===
Democratic Primary
Party	Candidate	Votes	%
Democratic	Jay Molette	5,398	100.0
Total votes		5,398	100.0

Republican Primary
Party	Candidate	Votes	%
Republican	Julie Calley (incumbent)	15,407	100.0
Total votes		15,407	100.0

General Election
Party	Candidate	Votes	%
Republican	Julie Calley (incumbent)	39,431	72.29
Democratic	Jay Molette	15,112	27.71
Total votes		54,543	100.0

=== District 88 ===
Democratic Primary
Party	Candidate	Votes	%
Democratic	Franklin Cornielle	4,811	100.0
Total votes		4,811	100.0

Republican Primary
Party	Candidate	Votes	%
Republican	Luke Meerman (incumbent)	16,412	100.0
Total votes		16,412	100.0

General Election
Party	Candidate	Votes	%
Republican	Luke Meerman (incumbent)	38,841	72.21
Democratic	Franklin Cornielle	14,946	27.79
Total votes		53,787	100.0

=== District 89 ===
Democratic Primary
Party	Candidate	Votes	%
Democratic	Anita Marie Brown	5,624	64.48
Democratic	Erik E. Nordman	3,098	35.52
Total votes		8,722	100.0

Republican Primary
Party	Candidate	Votes	%
Republican	Jim Lilly (incumbent)	14,544	100.0
Total votes		14,544	100.0

General Election
Party	Candidate	Votes	%
Republican	Jim Lilly (incumbent)	36,345	61.68
Democratic	Anita Marie Brown	22,578	38.32
Total votes		58,923	100.0

=== District 90 ===
Democratic Primary
Party	Candidate	Votes	%
Democratic	Christopher P. Banks	6,103	100.0
Total votes		6,103	100.0

Republican Primary
Party	Candidate	Votes	%
Republican	Bradley Slagh (incumbent)	9,258	77.15
Republican	Mark Northrup	2,742	22.85
Total votes		12,000	100.0

General Election
Party	Candidate	Votes	%
Republican	Bradley Slagh (incumbent)	32,446	64.22
Democratic	Christopher P. Banks	18,081	35.78
Total votes		50,527	100.0

=== District 91 ===
Democratic Primary
Party	Candidate	Votes	%
Democratic	Brian Hosticka	9,118	100.0
Total votes		9,118	100.0

Republican Primary
Party	Candidate	Votes	%
Republican	Greg VanWoerkom (incumbent)	8,676	100.0
Total votes		8,676	100.0

General Election
Party	Candidate	Votes	%
Republican	Greg VanWoerkom (incumbent)	29,968	60.09
Democratic	Brian Hosticka	19,901	39.91
Total votes		49,869	100.0

=== District 92 ===
Democratic Primary
Party	Candidate	Votes	%
Democratic	Terry Sabo (incumbent)	9,641	100.0
Total votes		9,641	100.0

Republican Primary
Party	Candidate	Votes	%
Republican	Michael L. Haueisen	2,157	54.52
Republican	Michael Del Percio	1,799	45.48
Total votes		3,956	100.0

General Election
Party	Candidate	Votes	%
Democratic	Terry Sabo (incumbent)	25,430	65.31
Republican	Michael L. Haueisen	13,506	34.69
Total votes		38,936	100.0

=== District 93 ===
Democratic Primary
Party	Candidate	Votes	%
Democratic	Muhammad Salman Rais	7,660	100.0
Total votes		7,660	100.0

Republican Primary
Party	Candidate	Votes	%
Republican	Graham Filler (incumbent)	13,305	100.0
Total votes		13,305	100.0

General Election
Party	Candidate	Votes	%
Republican	Graham Filler (incumbent)	34,707	63.18
Democratic	Muhammad Salman Rais	20,224	36.82
Total votes		54,931	100.0

=== District 94 ===
Democratic Primary
Party	Candidate	Votes	%
Democratic	Demond L. Tibbs	5,800	54.82
Democratic	Kevin C. Seamon	4,781	45.18
Total votes		10,581	100.0

Republican Primary
Party	Candidate	Votes	%
Republican	Rodney Wakeman (incumbent)	10,022	100.0
Total votes		10,022	100.0

General Election
Party	Candidate	Votes	%
Republican	Rodney Wakeman (incumbent)	31,457	59.89
Democratic	Demond L. Tibbs	21,065	40.11
Total votes		52,522	100.0

=== District 95 ===
Democratic Primary
Party	Candidate	Votes	%
Democratic	Amos O'Neal	5,199	45.97
Democratic	Clint Bryant	2,844	25.15
Democratic	Carly Rose Hammond	1,744	15.42
Democratic	James M. Graham	987	8.73
Democratic	Brandell Cortez Adams	535	4.73
Total votes		11,309	100.0

Republican Primary
Party	Candidate	Votes	%
Republican	Charlotte DeMaet	2,594	100.0
Total votes		2,594	100.0

General Election
Party	Candidate	Votes	%
Democratic	Amos O'Neal	23,909	70.12
Republican	Charlotte DeMaet	10,190	29.88
Total votes		34,099	100.0

=== District 96 ===
Results by precinct Beson: 50–60%; 60–70%; Elder: 50–60%; 60–70%

Poll source	Date(s) administered	Sample size	Margin of error	Brian Elder (D)	Timothy Beson (R)
Target Insyght/MIRS News	Oct 20–22, 2020	300 (V)	± 5.7%	46%	47%

Democratic Primary
Party	Candidate	Votes	%
Democratic	Brian Elder (incumbent)	11,462	100.0
Total votes		11,462	100.0

Republican Primary
Party	Candidate	Votes	%
Republican	Timothy Beson	3,431	50.05
Republican	Martin Blank	2,148	31.33
Republican	Allen Bauer	1,276	18.61
Total votes		6,855	100.0

General Election
Party	Candidate	Votes	%
Republican	Timothy Beson	25,655	54.60
Democratic	Brian Elder (incumbent)	21,328	45.40
Total votes		46,983	100.0

=== District 97 ===
Democratic Primary
Party	Candidate	Votes	%
Democratic	Celia Young-Wenkel	3,398	66.76
Democratic	Shane Atwell	1,692	33.24
Total votes		5,090	100.0

Republican Primary
Party	Candidate	Votes	%
Republican	Jason Wentworth	13,392	100.0
Total votes		13,392	100.0

General Election
Party	Candidate	Votes	%
Republican	Jason Wentworth	31,602	71.18
Democratic	Celia Young-Wenkel	12,794	28.82
Total votes		44,396	100.0

=== District 98 ===
Democratic Primary
Party	Candidate	Votes	%
Democratic	Sarah Schulz	7,677	100.0
Total votes		7,677	100.0

Republican Primary
Party	Candidate	Votes	%
Republican	Annette Glenn	10,717	100.0
Total votes		10,717	100.0

General Election
Party	Candidate	Votes	%
Republican	Annette Glenn	29,118	58.43
Democratic	Sarah Schulz	20,712	41.57
Total votes		49,830	100.0

=== District 99 ===
Democratic Primary
Party	Candidate	Votes	%
Democratic	John Zang	2,979	52.21
Democratic	Randall Doyle	2,727	47.79
Total votes		5,706	100.0

Republican Primary
Party	Candidate	Votes	%
Republican	Roger Hauck (incumbent)	8,145	100.0
Total votes		8,145	100.0

General Election
Party	Candidate	Votes	%
Republican	Roger Hauck (incumbent)	24,017	61.07
Democratic	John Zang	14,363	36.52
Green	Melissa Noelle Lambert	949	2.41
Total votes		39,329	100.0

=== District 100 ===
Democratic Primary
Party	Candidate	Votes	%
Democratic	Sandy Clarke	5,157	100.0
Total votes		5,157	100.0

Republican Primary
Party	Candidate	Votes	%
Republican	Scott VanSingel (incumbent)	10,151	68.21
Republican	Andrew Sebolt	4,730	31.79
Total votes		14,881	100.0

General Election
Party	Candidate	Votes	%
Republican	Scott VanSingel (incumbent)	32,343	70.02
Democratic	Sandy Clarke	13,851	29.98
Total votes		46,194	100.0

=== District 101 ===
Democratic Primary
Party	Candidate	Votes	%
Democratic	Beth McGill-Rizer	9,000	78.87
Democratic	Cary L. Urka	2,411	21.13
Total votes		11,411	100.0

Republican Primary
Party	Candidate	Votes	%
Republican	Jack O'Malley (incumbent)	14,581	86.77
Republican	Carolyn Carter	2,224	13.23
Total votes		16,805	100.0

General Election
Party	Candidate	Votes	%
Republican	Jack O'Malley (incumbent)	36,577	60.64
Democratic	Beth McGill-Rizer	23,746	39.36
Total votes		60,323	100.0

=== District 102 ===
Democratic Primary
Party	Candidate	Votes	%
Democratic	Amanda Siggins	4,278	100.0
Total votes		4,278	100.0

Republican Primary
Party	Candidate	Votes	%
Republican	Michele Hoitenga (incumbent)	14,586	100.0
Total votes		14,586	100.0

General Election
Party	Candidate	Votes	%
Republican	Michele Hoitenga (incumbent)	30,633	69.66
Democratic	Amanda Siggins	13,341	30.34
Total votes		43,974	100.0

=== District 103 ===
Democratic Primary
Party	Candidate	Votes	%
Democratic	Zach Larson	5,448	100.0
Total votes		5,448	100.0

Republican Primary
Party	Candidate	Votes	%
Republican	Daire Rendon (incumbent)	12,300	67.48
Republican	Gary F. Stefanko	5,927	32.52
Total votes		18,227	100.0

General Election
Party	Candidate	Votes	%
Republican	Daire Rendon (incumbent)	36,935	71.02
Democratic	Zach Larson	15,073	28.98
Total votes		52,008	100.0

=== District 104 ===
In the 104th district, incumbent Republican Larry Inman did not run for re-election due to term limits. District 104 was the number 1 target for the Democrats but was retained for the GOP by John Roth.

Poll source	Date(s) administered	Sample size	Margin of error	John Roth (R)	Dan O'Neil (D)
Mitchell Research & Communications/MIRS	September 14–18, 2020	≈300 (V)	± 5.6%	48%	40%

Democratic Primary
Party	Candidate	Votes	%
Democratic	Dan O'Neil	10,814	100.0
Total votes		10,814	100.0

Republican Primary
Party	Candidate	Votes	%
Republican	John Roth	7,858	57.68
Republican	Heather Cerone	5,765	42.32
Total votes		13,623	100.0

General Election
Party	Candidate	Votes	%
Republican	John Roth	30,311	50.93
Democratic	Dan O'Neil	28,009	47.06
Libertarian	Jason Crum	1,194	2.01
Total votes		59,514	100.0

=== District 105 ===
Democratic Primary
Party	Candidate	Votes	%
Democratic	Jonathan Burke	6,728	100.0
Total votes		6,728	100.0

Republican Primary
Party	Candidate	Votes	%
Republican	Ken Borton	10,643	55.00
Republican	Tony Cutler	6,990	36.12
Republican	Jimmy Schmidt	1,719	8.88
Total votes		19,352	100.0

General Election
Party	Candidate	Votes	%
Republican	Ken Borton	37,172	65.68
Democratic	Jonathan Burke	19,423	34.32
Total votes		56,595	100.0

=== District 106 ===
Democratic Primary
Party	Candidate	Votes	%
Democratic	LeeAnn Johnson	6,716	100.0
Total votes		6,716	100.0

Republican Primary
Party	Candidate	Votes	%
Republican	Sue Allor (incumbent)	17,108	100.0
Total votes		17,108	100.0

General Election
Party	Candidate	Votes	%
Republican	Sue Allor (incumbent)	38,313	69.37
Democratic	LeeAnn Johnson	16,917	30.63
Total votes		55,230	100.0

=== District 107 ===
Democratic Primary
Party	Candidate	Votes	%
Democratic	Jim Page	5,036	69.43
Democratic	Kurt Perron	2,217	30.57
Total votes		7,253	100.0

Republican Primary
Party	Candidate	Votes	%
Republican	John Damoose	8,055	55.62
Republican	Sue Fisher	1,749	12.08
Republican	Kathy Twardy	1,649	11.39
Republican	Terry Lamb	1,378	9.52
Republican	David James Laughbaum	745	5.14
Republican	Tana Baldwin	496	3.43
Republican	Damon Lieurance	409	2.82
Total votes		14,481	100.0

General Election
Party	Candidate	Votes	%
Republican	John Damoose	31,666	60.86
Democratic	Jim Page	20,367	39.14
Total votes		52,033	100.0

=== District 108 ===
Democratic Primary
Party	Candidate	Votes	%
Democratic	Renee Richer	7,261	100.0
Total votes		7,261	100.0

Republican Primary
Party	Candidate	Votes	%
Republican	Beau LaFave (incumbent)	8,767	100.0
Total votes		8,767	100.0

General Election
Party	Candidate	Votes	%
Republican	Beau LaFave (incumbent)	30,524	64.21
Democratic	Renee Richer	17,015	35.79
Total votes		47,539	100.0

=== District 109 ===
Democratic Primary
Party	Candidate	Votes	%
Democratic	Sara Cambensy (incumbent)	12,935	100.0
Total votes		12,935	100.0

Republican Primary
Party	Candidate	Votes	%
Republican	Melody Wagner	3,278	52.18
Republican	Matthew Goss	3,004	47.82
Total votes		6,282	100.0

General Election
Party	Candidate	Votes	%
Democratic	Sara Cambensy (incumbent)	26,419	56.56
Republican	Melody Wagner	19,643	42.06
Constitution	Jim Hafeman	644	1.38
Write-in	Deborah Sue LaFaive	0	0.00
Total votes		46,706	100.0

Results by county Cambensy: 60–70%; Wagner: 50–60%; 60–70%

Results by precinct Cambensy: 40–50%; 50–60%; 60–70%; 70–80%; Wagner: 50–60%; 60–70%; 70–80%; 80–90%

=== District 110 ===
Gregory Markkanen was re-elected in the 110th district.

Democratic Primary
Party	Candidate	Votes	%
Democratic	Janet Metsa	6,897	72.73
Democratic	Lawrence Dale	1,623	17.11
Democratic	Casey VerBerkmoes	963	10.16
Total votes		9,483	100.0

Republican Primary
Party	Candidate	Votes	%
Republican	Gregory Markkanen (incumbent)	8,990	100.0
Total votes		8,990	100.0

General Election
Party	Candidate	Votes	%
Republican	Gregory Markkanen (incumbent)	25,802	57.59
Democratic	Janet Metsa	18,457	41.20
Green	Rick Sauermilch	543	1.21
Total votes		44,802	100.0

Results by county Markkanen: 50–60%; 60–70%; Metsa: 50–60%

Results by precinct Markkanen: 50–60%; 60–70%; 70–80%; Metsa: 40–50%; 50–60%; 60–70%

== See also ==
- 2020 Michigan elections
- 2020 United States state legislative elections

== Notes ==
Partisan clients
