= Michigan's 104th House of Representatives district =

American legislative district

Michigan's 104th State House of Representatives district
Representative
| John Roth; R–Interlochen |
- Demographics: 91.6% White; 0.6% Black; 2.8% Hispanic; 0.6% Asian; 0.5% Native American; 0.5% Other; 3.5% Multiracial
- Population (2024): 91,383

Michigan's 104th House of Representatives district (also referred to as Michigan's 104th House district) is a legislative district within the Michigan House of Representatives located in parts of Antrim, Benzie, Grand Traverse, Kalkaska, Manistee, and Wexford counties. The district was created in 1965, when the Michigan House of Representatives district naming scheme changed from a county-based system to a numerical one.

== List of representatives ==
| Representative | Party | Dates | Residence | Notes |
|---|---|---|---|---|
| Arnell Engstrom | Republican | 1965–1968 | Traverse City | |
| Michael Dively | Republican | 1969–1974 | Traverse City | |
| Connie Binsfeld | Republican | 1975–1982 | Maple City | |
| Thomas G. Power | Republican | 1983–1992 | Traverse City | |
| Michelle McManus | Republican | 1993–1998 | Lake Leelanau | Lived in Traverse City until around 1995. |
| Jason Allen | Republican | 1999–2002 | Traverse City | |
| Howard Walker | Republican | 2003–2008 | Traverse City | |
| Wayne Schmidt | Republican | 2009–2014 | Traverse City | |
| Larry C. Inman | Republican | 2015–2019 | Williamsburg | |
| John Roth | Republican | 2021–present | Interlochen | Lived in Traverse City until around 2022. |

== Recent elections ==
=== 2020s ===
2026 Michigan House of Representatives election
| Party | Candidate | Votes | % |
|---|---|---|---|
| Republican | John R. Roth (incumbent) | 29,718 | 59.61 |
| Democratic | Mitchell Ryan Distin | 19,212 | 38.54 |
| Libertarian | Alexander Jarvis | 923 | 1.85 |
| Total votes | | 49,853 | 100 |
| Republican hold | | | |

2024 Michigan House of Representatives election
| Party | Candidate | Votes | % |
|---|---|---|---|
| Republican | John R. Roth | 36,778 | 62.9 |
| Democratic | Larry Knight | 16,681 | 28.5 |
| Independent | Cathy Albro | 3,800 | 6.5 |
| Libertarian | Tyler Lautner | 1,188 | 2.0 |
| Total votes | | 58,447 | 100 |
| Republican hold | | | |

2022 Michigan House of Representatives election
| Party | Candidate | Votes | % |
|---|---|---|---|
| Republican | John R. Roth | 29,832 | 62.7 |
| Democratic | Cathy Albro | 17,758 | 37.3 |
| Total votes | | 47,590 | 100 |
| Republican hold | | | |

2020 Michigan House of Representatives election
| Party | Candidate | Votes | % |
|---|---|---|---|
| Republican | John R. Roth | 30,311 | 50.9 |
| Democratic | Dan O’Neil | 28,009 | 47.1 |
| Libertarian | Jason Crum | 1,194 | 2.0 |
| Total votes | | 59,514 | 100 |
| Republican hold | | | |

2018 Michigan House of Representatives election
| Party | Candidate | Votes | % |
|---|---|---|---|
| Republican | Larry C. Inman | 24,071 | 50.4 |
| Democratic | Dan O'Neil | 23,722 | 49.6 |
| Total votes | | 47,793 | 100 |
| Republican hold | | | |

2016 Michigan House of Representatives election
| Party | Candidate | Votes | % |
|---|---|---|---|
| Republican | Larry C. Inman | 26,020 | 51.4 |
| Democratic | Betsy Coffia | 21,864 | 43.2 |
| Libertarian | Kelly J. Clark | 2,714 | 5.4 |
| Total votes | | 50,598 | 100 |
| Republican hold | | | |

2014 Michigan House of Representatives election
| Party | Candidate | Votes | % |
|---|---|---|---|
| Republican | Larry C. Inman | 17,394 | 53.2 |
| Democratic | Betsy Coffia | 15,317 | 46.8 |
| Total votes | | 32,711 | 100 |
| Republican hold | | | |

2012 Michigan House of Representatives election
| Party | Candidate | Votes | % |
|---|---|---|---|
| Republican | Wayne Schmidt | 26,042 | 56.5 |
| Democratic | Betsy Coffia | 20,049 | 43.5 |
| Total votes | | 46,091 | 100 |
| Republican hold | | | |

2010 Michigan House of Representatives election
| Party | Candidate | Votes | % |
|---|---|---|---|
| Republican | Wayne Schmidt | 23,458 | 60.5 |
| Democratic | John Scrudato | 10,948 | 28.2 |
| Independent | Megan Crandall | 4,391 | 11.3 |
| Total votes | | 38,797 | 100 |
| Republican hold | | | |

2008 Michigan House of Representatives election
| Party | Candidate | Votes | % |
|---|---|---|---|
| Republican | Wayne Schmidt | 29,116 | 53.3 |
| Democratic | Roman Grucz | 23,465 | 42.9 |
| Libertarian | Dan McDougall | 2,069 | 3.8 |
| Total votes | | 54,650 | 100 |
| Republican hold | | | |

== Historical district boundaries ==
| Map | Description | Apportionment Plan | Notes |
|---|---|---|---|
| | Benzie County; Grand Traverse County; Kalkaska County (part); Boardman Township; Orange Township; Springfield Township; Leelanau County; Missaukee County (part); McBain; Richland Township; Wexford County | 1964 Apportionment Plan | |
| | Benzie County Grand Traverse County (part): Excluding; Whitewater Township; Leelanau County Manistee County (part): Arcadia Township; Bear Lake Township; Maple Grove Township; Pleasanton Township; Springdale Township; Wexford County (part): Excluding; Slagle Township | 1972 Apportionment Plan | |
| | Grand Traverse County; Kalkaska County; Leelanau County | 1982 Apportionment Plan | |
| | Grand Traverse County Leelanau County | 1992 Apportionment Plan | |
| | Grand Traverse County Kalkaska County | 2001 Apportionment Plan | |
| | Grand Traverse County | 2011 Apportionment Plan | |
