= Howard Walker (politician) =

American politician

Member of the Michigan Senate from the 37th district
- In office January 1, 2011 – December 31, 2014
- Preceded by: Jason Allen
- Succeeded by: Wayne Schmidt

Member of the Michigan House of Representatives from the 104th district
- In office January 1, 2003 – December 31, 2008
- Preceded by: Jason Allen
- Succeeded by: Wayne Schmidt

Personal details
- Born: December 10, 1954 (age 71)
- Party: Republican
- Spouse: Dianne
- Education: Michigan Technological University

Howard Walker (born December 10, 1954) is a Republican politician from Michigan who served a term in the Michigan Senate after serving three terms in the Michigan House of Representatives.

Prior to his election to the Legislature, Walker had a career in the oil and gas industry and later started and owned a land surveying business.

In August 2013, Walker announced his intention not to seek a second term in the Senate. The next month, after voting in favor of expanding Medicaid in Michigan under the Affordable Care Act, Walker was caught on tape at a Republican luncheon telling a local conservative radio host "screw you" after the host, Brian Sommerfield, called Walker a "weak Republican."
