= Wayne Schmidt =

American politician (born 1966)

Wayne A. Schmidt

Member of the Michigan Senate from the 37th district
- Incumbent
- Assumed office January 1, 2015
- Preceded by: Howard Walker

Member of the Michigan House of Representatives from the 104th district
- In office January 1, 2009 – January 1, 2015
- Preceded by: Howard Walker
- Succeeded by: Larry C. Inman

Personal details
- Born: October 6, 1966 (age 59) Cleveland, Ohio, U.S.
- Party: Republican
- Spouse: Kathleen
- Children: 2
- Education: University of Chicago
- Committees: Transportation and Infrastructure (chairman); Commerce; Energy and Technology; Financial Liability Reform; Michigan Capitol Committee (chairman)
- Website: https://www.senatorwayneschmidt.com/

Wayne Schmidt (born October 6, 1966) is a former Republican member of the Michigan Senate and former member of the Michigan House of Representatives. He has represented Grand Traverse (and formerly Kalkaska) County in the 37th district since January 1, 2015 and formerly represented 104th District in the Michigan House.

On September 16, 2013, Wayne announced his candidacy to succeed Howard Walker for the 37th Michigan Senate seat and won the election in November 2014.
