= 2018 Michigan House of Representatives election =

- November 6, 2018

All 110 seats in the Michigan House of Representatives 56 seats needed for a majority
- Turnout: 54.64%
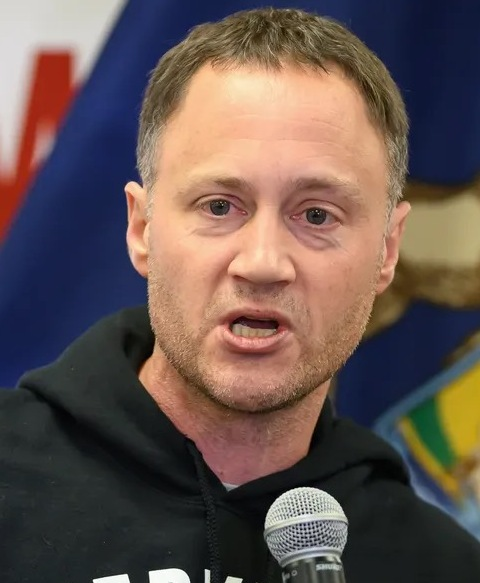

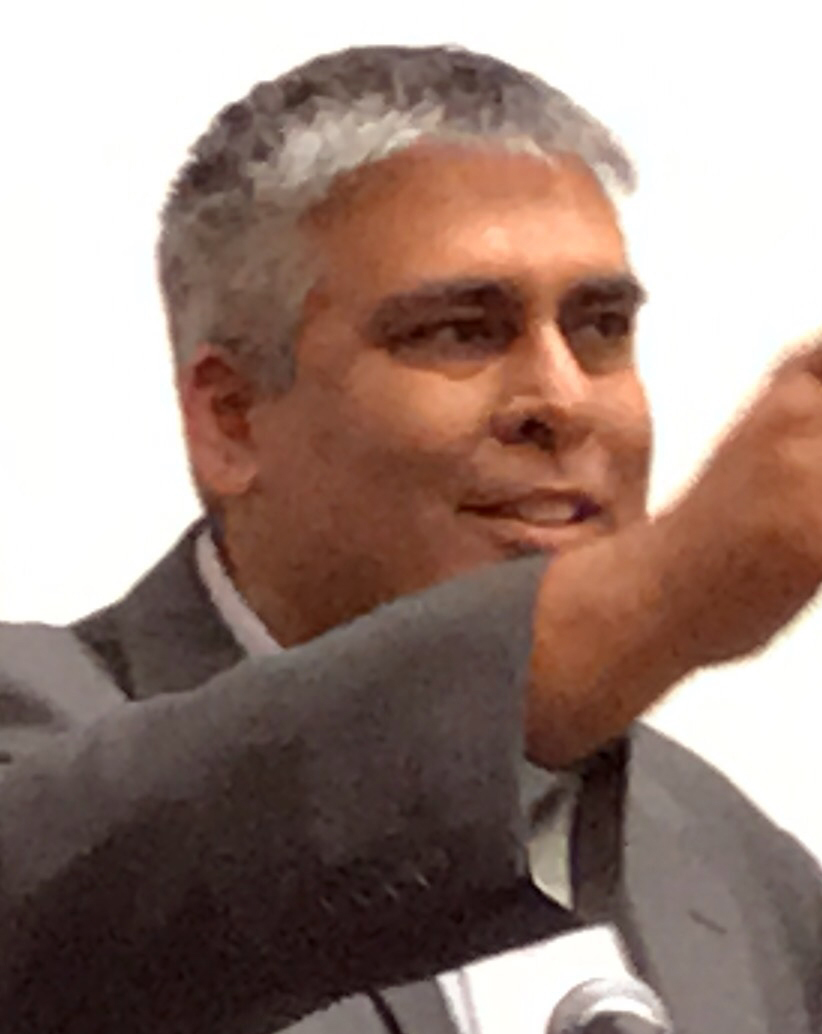
	Majority party	Minority party
Leader	Tom Leonard (term-limited)	Sam Singh (term-limited)
Party	Republican	Democratic
Leader since	January 11, 2017	January 11, 2017
Leader's seat	93rd District	69th District
Last election	63	47
Seats won	58	52
Seat change	▼5	▲5
Popular vote	1,935,174	2,128,281
Percentage	47.40%	52.13%
Swing	▼1.80%	▲3.00%
- Democratic gain Republican gain Democratic hold Republican hold Republican: 40–50% 50–60% 60–70% 70–80% Democratic: 50–60% 60–70% 70–80% 80–90% >90%
Speaker before election
Tom Leonard
Republican
Elected Speaker
Lee Chatfield
Republican

An election was held on November 6, 2018, to elect all 110 members to Michigan's House of Representatives. The election coincided with elections for other offices, including U.S. Senate, U.S. House of Representatives, governor and Senate. The primary election was held on August 7, 2018.

Republicans retained control of the House, despite losing the popular vote, after a net loss of five seats, winning 58 seats compared to 52 seats for the Democrats.

== Term-limited members ==
Under the Michigan Constitution, members of the state Senate are able to serve only two four-year terms, and members of the House of Representatives are limited to three two-year terms, some of the toughest term-limit laws in the country. After the 2018 mid-term elections, nearly 70 percent of the state Senate and 20 percent of the state House were forced to leave office because of term-limits. The following members were prevented by term-limits from seeking re-election to the House in 2018. This list does not include members who were eligible for re-election, but instead sought other office or voluntarily retired.

=== Democrats (13) ===
- 2nd District: Bettie Cook Scott
- 4th District: Rose Mary Robinson
- 16th District: Robert Kosowski
- 25th District: Henry Yanez
- 29th District: Tim Greimel
- 48th District: Pam Faris
- 49th District: Phil Phelps
- 55th District: Adam Zemke
- 67th District: Tom Cochran
- 68th District: Andy Schor
- 69th District: Sam Singh
- 76th District: Winnie Brinks
- 110th District: Scott Dianda

=== Republicans (11) ===
- 39th District: Klint Kesto
- 40th District: Mike McCready
- 41st District: Martin Howrylak
- 51st District: Joe Graves
- 74th District: Rob VerHeulen
- 78th District: Dave Pagel
- 81st District: Dan Lauwers
- 88th District: Roger Victory
- 91st District: Holly Hughes
- 93rd District: Tom Leonard
- 94th District: Tim Kelly

== Predictions ==
Source	Ranking	As of
Governing	Lean R	October 8, 2018

== Results ==
=== Statewide ===
Statewide results of the 2018 Michigan House of Representatives:

Party	Candi- dates	Votes		Seats		
Party	Candi- dates	No.	%	No.	+/–	%
Republican Party	110	1,935,174	47.40%	58	▼5	52.73%
Democratic Party	110	2,128,281	52.13%	52	▲5	47.27%
Libertarian Party	15	14,931	0.37%	0	Steady	0.00%
Green Party	3	2,233	0.05%	0	Steady	0.00%
Independent	1	1,425	0.03%	0	Steady	0.00%
US Taxpayers Party	1	398	0.01%	0	Steady	0.00%
Write-in	2	305	0.01%	0	Steady	0.00%
Total	242	4,082,747	100.00%	110	Steady	100.00%

Popular vote
Democratic	52.13%
Republican	47.40%
Other	0.47%

House seats
Republican	52.73%
Democratic	47.27%

=== District ===
Results of the 2018 Michigan House of Representatives election by district:

District	Democratic		Republican		Others		Total		Result
District	Votes	%	Votes	%	Votes	%	Votes	%	Result
District 1	21,790	72.91%	7,466	24.98%	631	2.11%	29,887	100.00%	Democratic hold
District 2	22,060	73.50%	7,954	26.50%	-	-	30,014	100.00%	Democratic hold
District 3	22,179	96.72%	751	3.28%	-	-	22,930	100.00%	Democratic hold
District 4	20,209	94.58%	1,159	5.42%	-	-	21,368	100.00%	Democratic hold
District 5	12,839	92.54%	765	5.51%	270	1.95%	13,874	100.00%	Democratic hold
District 6	21,005	91.08%	2,056	8.92%	-	-	23,061	100.00%	Democratic hold
District 7	25,838	97.62%	630	2.38%	-	-	26,468	100.00%	Democratic hold
District 8	26,995	96.35%	1,022	3.65%	-	-	28,017	100.00%	Democratic hold
District 9	20,783	95.13%	1,065	4.87%	-	-	21,848	100.00%	Democratic hold
District 10	28,713	84.01%	4,837	14.15%	630	1.84%	34,180	100.00%	Democratic hold
District 11	20,706	66.88%	10,252	33.12%	-	-	30,958	100.00%	Democratic hold
District 12	21,104	66.64%	10,567	33.36%	-	-	31,671	100.00%	Democratic hold
District 13	21,538	62.75%	12,783	37.25%	-	-	34,321	100.00%	Democratic hold
District 14	18,694	63.61%	10,695	36.39%	-	-	29,389	100.00%	Democratic hold
District 15	20,634	68.60%	9,445	31.40%	-	-	30,079	100.00%	Democratic hold
District 16	22,028	67.25%	10,728	32.75%	-	-	32,756	100.00%	Democratic hold
District 17	14,750	44.34%	18,513	55.66%	-	-	33,263	100.00%	Republican hold
District 18	25,820	62.65%	15,394	37.35%	-	-	41,214	100.00%	Democratic hold
District 19	23,454	50.24%	23,230	49.76%	-	-	46,684	100.00%	Democratic gain
District 20	24,797	51.42%	23,430	48.58%	-	-	48,227	100.00%	Democratic gain
District 21	27,444	61.82%	16,946	38.18%	-	-	44,390	100.00%	Democratic hold
District 22	18,841	62.36%	10,374	34.34%	999	3.31%	30,214	100.00%	Democratic hold
District 23	23,925	56.26%	18,603	43.74%	-	-	42,528	100.00%	Democratic hold
District 24	17,125	44.46%	21,391	55.54%	-	-	38,516	100.00%	Republican hold
District 25	19,081	54.04%	16,228	45.96%	-	-	35,309	100.00%	Democratic hold
District 26	27,962	68.51%	12,853	31.49%	-	-	40,815	100.00%	Democratic hold
District 27	35,054	78.50%	8,270	18.52%	1,328	2.97%	44,652	100.00%	Democratic hold
District 28	18,513	62.97%	10,115	34.41%	771	2.62%	29,399	100.00%	Democratic hold
District 29	19,964	74.11%	6,974	25.89%	-	-	26,938	100.00%	Democratic hold
District 30	13,284	43.14%	17,511	56.86%	-	-	30,795	100.00%	Republican hold
District 31	20,791	59.89%	13,925	40.11%	-	-	34,716	100.00%	Democratic hold
District 32	13,840	38.52%	22,092	61.48%	-	-	35,932	100.00%	Republican hold
District 33	13,865	34.84%	25,929	65.16%	-	-	39,794	100.00%	Republican hold
District 34	18,886	89.98%	2,102	10.02%	-	-	20,988	100.00%	Democratic hold
District 35	40,606	85.45%	6,912	14.55%	-	-	47,518	100.00%	Democratic hold
District 36	12,894	31.70%	26,974	66.32%	807	1.98%	40,675	100.00%	Republican hold
District 37	28,777	67.22%	14,032	32.78%	-	-	42,809	100.00%	Democratic hold
District 38	21,886	48.14%	22,474	49.44%	1,100	2.42%	45,460	100.00%	Republican hold
District 39	18,093	42.28%	23,173	54.15%	1,531	3.58%	42,797	100.00%	Republican hold
District 40	30,222	56.55%	23,222	43.45%	-	-	53,444	100.00%	Democratic gain
District 41	22,320	51.32%	21,170	48.68%	-	-	43,490	100.00%	Democratic gain
District 42	19,940	40.01%	29,897	59.99%	-	-	49,837	100.00%	Republican hold
District 43	18,509	43.48%	24,061	56.52%	-	-	42,570	100.00%	Republican hold
District 44	19,329	42.47%	26,186	57.53%	-	-	45,515	100.00%	Republican hold
District 45	19,235	44.88%	23,628	55.12%	-	-	42,863	100.00%	Republican hold
District 46	17,898	40.05%	26,786	59.95%	-	-	44,684	100.00%	Republican hold
District 47	14,638	33.58%	28,948	66.42%	-	-	43,586	100.00%	Republican hold
District 48	19,998	54.83%	16,474	45.17%	-	-	36,472	100.00%	Democratic hold
District 49	22,769	72.37%	8,695	27.63%	-	-	31,464	100.00%	Democratic hold
District 50	22,057	57.18%	16,515	42.82%	-	-	38,572	100.00%	Democratic hold
District 51	18,012	40.13%	26,870	59.87%	-	-	44,882	100.00%	Republican hold
District 52	30,089	60.53%	19,589	39.40%	35	0.07%	49,713	100.00%	Democratic hold
District 53	33,701	86.87%	5,095	13.13%	-	-	38,796	100.00%	Democratic hold
District 54	28,500	78.65%	7,737	21.35%	-	-	36,237	100.00%	Democratic hold
District 55	30,185	73.96%	10,629	26.04%	-	-	40,814	100.00%	Democratic hold
District 56	13,289	37.68%	21,979	62.32%	-	-	35,268	100.00%	Republican hold
District 57	13,492	37.04%	22,936	62.96%	-	-	36,428	100.00%	Republican hold
District 58	8,973	28.91%	22,070	71.09%	-	-	31,043	100.00%	Republican hold
District 59	10,656	33.75%	20,922	66.25%	-	-	31,578	100.00%	Republican hold
District 60	26,772	76.59%	8,181	23.41%	-	-	34,953	100.00%	Democratic hold
District 61	22,719	48.63%	24,002	51.37%	-	-	46,721	100.00%	Republican hold
District 62	15,937	51.85%	14,800	48.15%	-	-	30,737	100.00%	Democratic gain
District 63	15,809	39.39%	22,711	56.59%	1,616	4.03%	40,136	100.00%	Republican hold
District 64	12,470	39.90%	18,050	57.75%	736	2.35%	31,256	100.00%	Republican hold
District 65	13,942	37.95%	21,774	59.26%	1,026	2.79%	36,742	100.00%	Republican hold
District 66	15,637	43.18%	20,577	56.82%	-	-	36,214	100.00%	Republican hold
District 67	22,565	53.71%	18,454	43.92%	994	2.37%	42,013	100.00%	Democratic hold
District 68	26,664	74.90%	8,210	23.06%	724	2.03%	35,598	100.00%	Democratic hold
District 69	27,353	71.60%	10,847	28.40%	-	-	38,200	100.00%	Democratic hold
District 70	11,130	38.38%	17,870	61.62%	-	-	29,000	100.00%	Republican hold
District 71	21,990	50.80%	21,299	49.20%	-	-	43,289	100.00%	Democratic gain
District 72	17,273	43.36%	21,374	53.66%	1,185	2.97%	39,832	100.00%	Republican hold
District 73	20,430	39.89%	30,783	60.11%	-	-	51,213	100.00%	Republican hold
District 74	15,964	39.51%	24,445	60.49%	-	-	40,409	100.00%	Republican hold
District 75	23,709	77.73%	5,841	19.15%	952	3.12%	30,502	100.00%	Democratic hold
District 76	27,009	60.87%	17,366	39.13%	-	-	44,375	100.00%	Democratic hold
District 77	13,819	36.76%	22,514	59.88%	1,264	3.36%	37,597	100.00%	Republican hold
District 78	12,978	38.65%	20,596	61.35%	-	-	33,574	100.00%	Republican hold
District 79	15,451	44.32%	19,411	55.68%	-	-	34,862	100.00%	Republican hold
District 80	14,275	36.35%	25,000	63.65%	-	-	39,275	100.00%	Republican hold
District 81	13,130	36.53%	22,811	63.47%	-	-	35,941	100.00%	Republican hold
District 82	11,516	30.20%	26,616	69.80%	-	-	38,132	100.00%	Republican hold
District 83	11,218	35.72%	20,185	64.28%	-	-	31,403	100.00%	Republican hold
District 84	11,417	32.96%	23,217	67.04%	-	-	34,634	100.00%	Republican hold
District 85	14,652	38.21%	23,692	61.79%	-	-	38,344	100.00%	Republican hold
District 86	16,026	36.73%	26,176	60.00%	1,425	3.27%	43,627	100.00%	Republican hold
District 87	13,213	32.44%	27,515	67.56%	-	-	40,728	100.00%	Republican hold
District 88	11,667	28.98%	28,593	71.02%	-	-	40,260	100.00%	Republican hold
District 89	17,061	37.93%	27,917	62.07%	-	-	44,978	100.00%	Republican hold
District 90	12,754	34.31%	24,421	65.69%	-	-	37,175	100.00%	Republican hold
District 91	16,616	44.27%	20,914	55.73%	-	-	37,530	100.00%	Republican hold
District 92	19,614	68.75%	8,917	31.25%	-	-	28,531	100.00%	Democratic hold
District 93	18,913	44.56%	22,265	52.45%	1,268	2.99%	42,446	100.00%	Republican hold
District 94	18,739	44.51%	23,366	55.49%	-	-	42,105	100.00%	Republican hold
District 95	19,421	73.09%	7,149	26.91%	-	-	26,570	100.00%	Democratic hold
District 96	20,175	56.51%	15,527	43.49%	-	-	35,702	100.00%	Democratic hold
District 97	10,652	32.15%	22,476	67.85%	-	-	33,128	100.00%	Republican hold
District 98	18,629	47.97%	20,209	52.03%	-	-	38,838	100.00%	Republican hold
District 99	14,062	46.58%	16,127	53.42%	-	-	30,189	100.00%	Republican hold
District 100	11,724	33.87%	22,889	66.13%	-	-	34,613	100.00%	Republican hold
District 101	20,715	42.31%	28,249	57.69%	-	-	48,964	100.00%	Republican hold
District 102	10,599	32.23%	22,286	67.77%	-	-	32,885	100.00%	Republican hold
District 103	14,161	35.29%	25,966	64.71%	-	-	40,127	100.00%	Republican hold
District 104	23,722	49.63%	24,071	50.37%	-	-	47,793	100.00%	Republican hold
District 105	15,999	35.47%	29,112	64.53%	-	-	45,111	100.00%	Republican hold
District 106	16,935	38.99%	26,498	61.01%	-	-	43,433	100.00%	Republican hold
District 107	17,448	41.27%	24,834	58.73%	-	-	42,282	100.00%	Republican hold
District 108	13,958	38.36%	22,431	61.64%	-	-	36,389	100.00%	Republican hold
District 109	21,669	58.09%	15,631	41.91%	-	-	37,300	100.00%	Democratic hold
District 110	17,401	49.18%	17,980	50.82%	-	-	35,381	100.00%	Republican gain
Total	2,128,281	52.13%	1,935,174	47.40%	19,292	0.47%	4,082,747	100.00%	

== General election ==
^{1}	Incumbent representative
^{2}	Current member of Senate

=== Districts 1-28 ===
1st District
Party	Candidate	Votes	%
Democratic	Tenisha Yancey^{1}	21,801	72.92
Republican	Mark Corcoran	7,466	24.97
Libertarian	Gregory Creswell	631	2.11
Total votes		29,898	
Democratic hold			

2nd District
Party	Candidate	Votes	%
Democratic	Joe Tate	21,512	73.05
Republican	John Palffy	7,935	26.95
Total votes		29,447	
Democratic hold			

3rd District
Party	Candidate	Votes	%
Democratic	Wendell Byrd^{1}	22,179	96.72
Republican	Dolores Brodersen	751	3.28
Total votes		22,930	
Democratic hold			

4th District
Party	Candidate	Votes	%
Democratic	Isaac Robinson	19,984	94.55
Republican	Howard Weathington	1,153	5.45
Total votes		21,137	
Democratic hold			

5th District
Party	Candidate	Votes	%
Democratic	Cynthia A. Johnson	12,838	94.38
Republican	Dorothy Patterson	764	5.62
Total votes		13,602	
Democratic hold			

6th District
Party	Candidate	Votes	%
Democratic	Tyrone Carter	20,837	91.05
Republican	Linda Sawyer	2,049	8.95
Total votes		22,886	
Democratic hold			

7th District
Party	Candidate	Votes	%
Democratic	LaTanya Garrett^{1}	25,795	97.65
Republican	Marcelis Turner	621	2.35
Total votes		26,416	
Democratic hold			

8th District
Party	Candidate	Votes	%
Democratic	Sherry Gay-Dagnogo^{1}	26,983	96.35
Republican	Valerie R. Parker	1,022	3.65
Total votes		28,005	
Democratic hold			

9th District
Party	Candidate	Votes	%
Democratic	Karen Whitsett	20,579	95.16
Republican	James Stephens	1,046	4.84
Total votes		21,625	
Democratic hold			

10th District
Party	Candidate	Votes	%
Democratic	Leslie Love^{1}	27,868	84.78
Republican	William Brang	4,393	13.36
Libertarian	Jeremy Morgan	611	1.86
Total votes		32,872	
Democratic hold			

11th District
Party	Candidate	Votes	%
Democratic	Jewell Jones^{1}	20,702	66.88
Republican	James Townsend	10,252	33.12
Total votes		30,954	
Democratic hold			

12th District
Party	Candidate	Votes	%
Democratic	Alex Garza	21,099	66.63
Republican	Michelle Bailey	10,567	33.37
Total votes		31,666	
Democratic hold			

13th District
Party	Candidate	Votes	%
Democratic	Frank Liberati^{1}	21,196	62.78
Republican	Annie Spencer	12,568	37.22
Total votes		33,764	
Democratic hold			

14th District
Party	Candidate	Votes	%
Democratic	Cara Clemente^{1}	18,694	63.61
Republican	Darrell Stasik	10,695	36.39
Total votes		29,389	
Democratic hold			

15th District
Party	Candidate	Votes	%
Democratic	Abdullah Hammoud^{1}	20,631	68.60
Republican	Doug Mitchell	9,445	31.40
Total votes		30,076	
Democratic hold			

16th District
Party	Candidate	Votes	%
Democratic	Kevin Coleman	22,027	67.25
Republican	Jody Rice-White	10,728	32.75
Total votes		32,755	
Democratic hold			

17th District
Party	Candidate	Votes	%
Republican	Joe Bellino^{1}	18,513	55.66
Democratic	Michelle LaVoy	14,750	44.34
Total votes		33,263	
Republican hold			

18th District
Party	Candidate	Votes	%
Democratic	Kevin Hertel^{1}	25,820	62.65
Republican	Kyle McKee	15,394	37.35
Total votes		41,214	
Democratic hold			

19th District
Party	Candidate	Votes	%
Democratic	Laurie Pohutsky	23,457	50.24
Republican	Brian Meakin	23,236	49.76
Total votes		46,693	
Democratic gain from Republican			

20th District
Party	Candidate	Votes	%
Democratic	Matt Koleszar	24,792	51.42
Republican	Jeff Noble^{1}	23,427	48.58
Total votes		48,219	
Democratic gain from Republican			

21st District
Party	Candidate	Votes	%
Democratic	Kristy Pagan^{1}	27,444	61.83
Republican	Darian Moore	16,944	38.17
Total votes		44,388	
Democratic hold			

22nd District
Party	Candidate	Votes	%
Democratic	John Chirkun^{1}	18,840	62.36
Republican	Arthur Blundell	10,374	34.34
Libertarian	Matt Kuehnel	999	3.31
Total votes		30,213	
Democratic hold			

23rd District
Party	Candidate	Votes	%
Democratic	Darrin Camilleri^{1}	23,416	56.63
Republican	Michael Frazier	17,935	43.37
Total votes		41,351	
Democratic hold			

24th District
Party	Candidate	Votes	%
Republican	Steve Marino^{1}	21,391	55.54
Democratic	Laura Winn	17,124	44.46
Total votes		38,515	
Republican hold			

25th District
Party	Candidate	Votes	%
Democratic	Nate Shannon	19,133	53.96
Republican	Jazmine M. Early	16,325	46.04
Total votes		35,458	
Democratic hold			

26th District
Party	Candidate	Votes	%
Democratic	Jim Ellison^{1}	27,961	68.51
Republican	Al Gui	12,852	31.49
Total votes		40,813	
Democratic hold			

27th District
Party	Candidate	Votes	%
Democratic	Robert Wittenberg^{1}	35,051	78.51
Republican	Janet Flessland	8,269	18.52
Libertarian	Benjamin Carr	1,328	2.97
Total votes		44,648	
Democratic hold			

28th District
Party	Candidate	Votes	%
Democratic	Lori M. Stone	18,509	62.97
Republican	Aaron Delikta	10,114	34.41
Libertarian	Ryan Manier	770	2.62
Total votes		29,393	
Democratic hold			

=== Districts 29-55 ===
29th District
Party	Candidate	Votes	%
Democratic	Brenda Carter	19,964	74.11
Republican	Timothy D. Carrier	6,974	25.89
Total votes		26,938	100
Democratic hold			

30th District
Party	Candidate	Votes	%
Republican	Diana Farrington^{1}	17,511	56.86
Democratic	John P. Spica	13,284	43.14
Total votes		30,795	100
Republican hold			

31st District
Party	Candidate	Votes	%
Democratic	William J. Sowerby^{1}	20,791	59.89
Republican	Lisa Valerio-Nowc	13,925	40.11
Total votes		34,716	100
Democratic hold			

32nd District
Party	Candidate	Votes	%
Republican	Pamela Hornberger^{1}	22,092	61.48
Democratic	Paul Manley	13,840	38.52
Total votes		35,932	100
Republican hold			

33rd District
Party	Candidate	Votes	%
Republican	Jeff Yaroch^{1}	25,929	65.16
Democratic	Andrea Geralds	13,865	34.84
Total votes		39,794	100
Republican hold			

34th District
Party	Candidate	Votes	%
Democratic	Sheldon A. Neeley^{1}	18,886	89.98
Republican	Henry Swift	2,102	10.02
Total votes		20,988	100
Democratic hold			

35th District
Party	Candidate	Votes	%
Democratic	Kyra Harris Bolden	40,606	85.45
Republican	Theodore Alfonsetti III	6,912	14.55
Total votes		47,518	100
Democratic hold			

36th District
Party	Candidate	Votes	%
Republican	Douglas C. Wozniak	26,974	66.32
Democratic	Robert Murphy	12,894	31.70
Libertarian	Benjamin Dryke	807	1.98
Total votes		40,675	100
Republican hold			

37th District
Party	Candidate	Votes	%
Democratic	Christine Greig^{1}	28,777	67.22
Republican	Mitch Swoboda	14,032	32.78
Total votes		42,809	100
Democratic hold			

38th District
Party	Candidate	Votes	%
Republican	Kathy Crawford^{1}	22,474	49.44
Democratic	Kelly A. Breen	21,886	48.14
Libertarian	Brian R. Wright	1,100	2.42
Total votes		45,460	100
Republican hold			

39th District
Party	Candidate	Votes	%
Republican	Ryan Berman	23,173	54.15
Democratic	Jennifer Suidan	18,093	42.28
Libertarian	Anthony Croff	1,531	3.58
Total votes		42,797	100
Republican hold			

40th District
Party	Candidate	Votes	%
Democratic	Mari Manoogian	30,222	56.55
Republican	David Wolkinson	23,222	43.45
Total votes		53,444	100
Democratic gain from Republican			

41st District
Party	Candidate	Votes	%
Democratic	Padma Kuppa	22,320	51.32
Republican	Doug Tietz	21,170	48.68
Total votes		43,490	100
Democratic gain from Republican			

42nd District
Party	Candidate	Votes	%
Republican	Ann Bollin	29,897	59.99
Democratic	Mona M. Shand	19,940	40.01
Total votes		49,837	100
Republican hold			

43rd District
Party	Candidate	Votes	%
Republican	Andrea K. Schroeder	24,061	56.52
Democratic	Nicole Breadon	18,509	43.48
Total votes		42,570	100
Republican hold			

44th District
Party	Candidate	Votes	%
Republican	Matt Maddock	26,186	57.53
Democratic	Laura Dodd	19,329	42.47
Total votes		45,515	100
Republican hold			

45th District
Party	Candidate	Votes	%
Republican	Michael Webber^{1}	23,628	55.12
Democratic	Kyle Cooper	19,235	44.88
Total votes		42,863	100
Republican hold			

46th District
Party	Candidate	Votes	%
Republican	John Reilly^{1}	26,786	59.95
Democratic	Mindy Denninger	17,898	40.05
Total votes		44,684	100
Republican hold			

47th District
Party	Candidate	Votes	%
Republican	Hank Vaupel^{1}	28,948	66.42
Democratic	Colleen Turk	14,638	33.58
Total votes		43,586	100
Republican hold			

48th District
Party	Candidate	Votes	%
Democratic	Sheryl Y. Kennedy	19,998	54.83
Republican	Al Hardwick	16,474	45.17
Total votes		36,472	100
Democratic hold			

49th District
Party	Candidate	Votes	%
Democratic	John Daniel Cherry	22,769	72.37
Republican	Patrick Duvendeck	8,695	27.63
Total votes		31,464	100
Democratic hold			

50th District
Party	Candidate	Votes	%
Democratic	Tim Sneller^{1}	22,057	57.18
Republican	Trace Fisher	16,515	42.82
Total votes		38,572	100
Democratic hold			

51st District
Party	Candidate	Votes	%
Republican	Mike Mueller	26,870	59.87
Democratic	David E. Lossing	18,012	40.13
Total votes		44,882	100
Republican hold			

52nd District
Party	Candidate	Votes	%
Democratic	Donna Lasinski^{1}	30,089	60.53
Republican	Teri Aiuto	19,589	39.40
Write-in candidate	Teresa Spiegelberg	35	0.07
Total votes		49,713	100
Democratic hold			

53rd District
Party	Candidate	Votes	%
Democratic	Yousef Rabhi^{1}	33,701	86.87
Republican	Jean E. Holland	5,095	13.13
Total votes		38,796	100
Democratic hold			

54th District
Party	Candidate	Votes	%
Democratic	Ronnie D. Peterson^{1}	28,500	78.65
Republican	Colton A. Campbell	7,737	21.35
Total votes		36,237	100
Democratic hold			

55th District
Party	Candidate	Votes	%
Democratic	Rebekah Warren^{2}	30,185	73.96
Republican	Bob Baird	10,629	26.04
Total votes		40,814	100
Democratic hold			

=== Districts 56-83 ===
56th District
Party	Candidate	Votes	%
Republican	Jason M. Sheppard^{1}	21,979	62.32
Democratic	Ernie Whiteside	13,289	37.68
Total votes		35,268	100
Republican hold			

57th District
Party	Candidate	Votes	%
Republican	Bronna Kahle^{1}	22,936	62.96
Democratic	Amber Pedersen	13,492	37.04
Total votes		36,428	100
Republican hold			

58th District
Party	Candidate	Votes	%
Republican	Eric Leutheuser^{1}	22,070	71.09
Democratic	Tamara C. Barnes	8,973	28.91
Total votes		31,043	100
Republican hold			

59th District
Party	Candidate	Votes	%
Republican	Aaron Miller^{1}	20,922	66.25
Democratic	Dennis B. Smith	10,656	33.75
Total votes		31,578	100
Republican hold			

60th District
Party	Candidate	Votes	%
Democratic	Jon Hoadley^{1}	26,772	76.59
Republican	William Baker	8,181	23.41
Total votes		34,953	100
Democratic hold			

61st District
Party	Candidate	Votes	%
Republican	Brandt Iden^{1}	24,002	51.37
Democratic	Alberta Griffin	22,719	48.63
Total votes		46,721	100
Republican hold			

Results by precinct Haadsma: 50–60%; 60–70%; 70–80%; 80–90%; Morgan: 50–60%; 60–70%; 70–80%

62nd District
Party	Candidate	Votes	%
Democratic	Jim Haadsma	15,937	51.85
Republican	Dave Morgan	14,800	48.15
Total votes		30,737	100
Democratic gain from Republican			

63rd District
Party	Candidate	Votes	%
Republican	Matt Hall	22,711	56.59
Democratic	Jennifer Aniano	15,809	39.39
Libertarian	Ronald Hawkins	1,059	2.64
Green	John Anthony La Pietra	557	1.39
Total votes		40,136	100
Republican hold			

64th District
Party	Candidate	Votes	%
Republican	Julie Alexander^{1}	18,050	57.75
Democratic	Sheila Troxel	12,470	39.90
Libertarian	Norman M. Peterson	736	2.35
Total votes		31,256	100
Republican hold			

65th District
Party	Candidate	Votes	%
Republican	Sarah Lightner	21,774	59.26
Democratic	Terri McKinnon	13,942	37.95
Libertarian	Jason B. Rees	1,026	2.79
Total votes		36,742	100
Republican hold			

66th District
Party	Candidate	Votes	%
Republican	Beth Griffin	20,577	56.82
Democratic	Dan Seibert	15,637	43.18
Total votes		36,214	100
Republican hold			

67th District
Party	Candidate	Votes	%
Democratic	Kara Hope	22,565	53.71
Republican	Leon R. Clark	18,454	43.92
Libertarian	Zachary Moreau	994	2.37
Total votes		42,013	100
Democratic hold			

68th District
Party	Candidate	Votes	%
Democratic	Sarah Anthony	26,664	74.90
Republican	Rosalinda Hernandez	8,210	23.06
Green	Robin Lea Laurain	724	2.03
Total votes		35,598	100
Democratic hold			

69th District
Party	Candidate	Votes	%
Democratic	Julie Brixie	27,353	71.60
Republican	George Nastas	10,847	28.40
Total votes		38,200	100
Democratic hold			

70th District
Party	Candidate	Votes	%
Republican	James Lower^{1}	17,870	61.62
Democratic	Kresta Train	11,130	38.38
Total votes		29,000	100
Republican hold			

Results by precinct Witwer: 50–60%; 60–70%; 80–90%; Barnes: 50–60%; 60–70%; 70–80%; Tie: 50%

71st District
Party	Candidate	Votes	%
Democratic	Angela Witwer	21,990	50.80
Republican	Christine E. Barnes	21,299	49.20
Total votes		43,289	100
Democratic gain from Republican			

72nd District
Party	Candidate	Votes	%
Republican	Steven Johnson	21,374	53.66
Democratic	Ron Draayer	17,273	43.36
Libertarian	Jamie Lewis	1,185	2.97
Total votes		39,832	100
Republican hold			

73rd District
Party	Candidate	Votes	%
Republican	Lynn Afendoulis	30,783	60.11
Democratic	Bill Saxton	20,430	39.89
Total votes		51,213	100
Republican hold			

74th District
Party	Candidate	Votes	%
Republican	Mark E. Huizenga	24,445	60.49
Democratic	Meagan L. Carr	15,964	39.51
Total votes		40,409	100
Republican hold			

75th District
Party	Candidate	Votes	%
Democratic	David LaGrand^{1}	23,709	77.73
Republican	Daniel Allen Schutte	5,841	19.15
Green	Jacob Straley	952	3.12
Total votes		30,502	100
Democratic hold			

76th District
Party	Candidate	Votes	%
Democratic	Rachel Hood	27,009	60.87
Republican	Amanda Brand	17,366	39.13
Total votes		44,375	100
Democratic hold			

77th District
Party	Candidate	Votes	%
Republican	Tommy Brann^{1}	22,514	59.88
Democratic	Dana Knight	13,819	36.76
Libertarian	Patty Malowney	866	2.30
Constitution	Brandon Hoezee	398	1.06
Total votes		37,597	100
Republican hold			

78th District
Party	Candidate	Votes	%
Republican	Brad Paquette	20,596	61.35
Democratic	Dean E. Hill	12,978	38.65
Total votes		33,574	100
Republican hold			

79th District
Party	Candidate	Votes	%
Republican	Pauline Wendzel	19,411	55.68
Democratic	Joey B. Andrews	15,451	44.32
Total votes		34,862	100
Republican hold			

80th District
Party	Candidate	Votes	%
Republican	Mary Whiteford^{1}	25,000	63.65
Democratic	Mark Ludwig	14,275	36.35
Total votes		39,275	100
Republican hold			

81st District
Party	Candidate	Votes	%
Republican	Gary R. Eisen	22,811	63.47
Democratic	Joshua Rivard	13,130	36.53
Total votes		35,941	100
Republican hold			

82nd District
Party	Candidate	Votes	%
Republican	Gary Howell^{1}	26,616	69.80
Democratic	Christopher Giles	11,516	30.20
Total votes		38,132	100
Republican hold			

83rd District
Party	Candidate	Votes	%
Republican	Shane Hernandez^{1}	20,185	64.28
Democratic	Stefanie Brown	11,218	35.72
Total votes		31,403	100
Republican hold			

=== Districts 84-110 ===
84th District
Party	Candidate	Votes	%
Republican	Phil Green	23,217	67.04
Democratic	William Shoop	11,417	32.96
Total votes		34,634	100
Republican hold			

85th District
Party	Candidate	Votes	%
Republican	Ben Frederick^{1}	23,692	61.79
Democratic	Eric Edward Sabin	14,652	38.21
Total votes		38,344	100
Republican hold			

86th District
Party	Candidate	Votes	%
Republican	Thomas A. Albert^{1}	26,176	60.00
Democratic	Lauren Taylor	16,026	36.73
Independent	Sue Norman	1,425	3.27
Total votes		43,627	100
Republican hold			

87th District
Party	Candidate	Votes	%
Republican	Julie Calley^{1}	27,515	67.56
Democratic	Shawn Marie Winters	13,213	32.44
Total votes		40,728	100
Republican hold			

88th District
Party	Candidate	Votes	%
Republican	Luke Meerman	28,593	71.02
Democratic	Heidi A. Zuniga	11,667	28.98
Total votes		40,260	100
Republican hold			

89th District
Party	Candidate	Votes	%
Republican	Jim Lilly^{1}	27,917	62.07
Democratic	Jerry Sias	17,061	37.93
Total votes		44,978	100
Republican hold			

90th District
Party	Candidate	Votes	%
Republican	Bradley Slagh	24,421	65.69
Democratic	Christopher Banks	12,754	34.31
Total votes		37,175	100
Republican hold			

91st District
Party	Candidate	Votes	%
Republican	Greg VanWoerkom	20,914	55.73
Democratic	Tanya Cabala	16,616	44.27
Total votes		37,530	100
Republican hold			

92nd District
Party	Candidate	Votes	%
Democratic	Terry Sabo^{1}	19,614	68.75
Republican	Gail Eichorst	8,917	31.25
Total votes		28,531	100
Democratic hold			

93rd District
Party	Candidate	Votes	%
Republican	Graham Filler	22,265	52.45
Democratic	Dawn D. Levey	18,913	44.56
Libertarian	Tyler Palmer	1,268	2.99
Total votes		42,446	100
Republican hold			

94th District
Party	Candidate	Votes	%
Republican	Rodney Wakeman	23,366	55.49
Democratic	Dave Adams	18,739	44.51
Total votes		42,105	100
Republican hold			

95th District
Party	Candidate	Votes	%
Democratic	Vanessa Guerra^{1}	19,421	73.09
Republican	Dorothy Tanner	7,149	26.91
Total votes		26,570	100
Democratic hold			

96th District
Party	Candidate	Votes	%
Democratic	Brian Elder^{1}	20,175	56.51
Republican	Susan Kay Kowalski	15,527	43.49
Total votes		35,702	100
Democratic hold			

97th District
Party	Candidate	Votes	%
Republican	Jason Wentworth^{1}	22,476	67.85
Democratic	Celia Young-Wenkel	10,652	32.15
Total votes		33,128	100
Republican hold			

98th District
Party	Candidate	Votes	%
Republican	Annette Glenn	20,209	52.03
Democratic	Sarah Schulz	18,629	47.97
Total votes		38,838	100
Republican hold			

99th District
Party	Candidate	Votes	%
Republican	Roger Hauck^{1}	16,127	53.42
Democratic	Kristen Brown	14,062	46.58
Total votes		30,189	100
Republican hold			

100th District
Party	Candidate	Votes	%
Republican	Scott VanSingel^{1}	22,889	'66.13
Democratic	Sandy Clarke	11,724	33.87
Total votes		34,613	100
Republican hold			

101st District
Party	Candidate	Votes	%
Republican	Jack O'Malley	28,249	57.69
Democratic	Kathy Wiejaczka	20,715	42.31
Total votes		48,964	100
Republican hold			

102nd District
Party	Candidate	Votes	%
Republican	Michele Hoitenga^{1}	22,286	67.77
Democratic	Dion Adams	10,599	32.23
Total votes		32,885	100
Republican hold			

103rd District
Party	Candidate	Votes	%
Republican	Daire Rendon^{1}	25,966	64.71
Democratic	Tim Schaiberger	14,161	35.29
Total votes		40,127	100
Republican hold			

104th District
Party	Candidate	Votes	%
Republican	Larry C. Inman^{1}	24,071	50.37
Democratic	Dan O'Neil	23,722	49.63
Total votes		47,793	100
Republican hold			

105th District
Party	Candidate	Votes	%
Republican	Triston Cole^{1}	29,112	64.53
Democratic	Melissa Fruge	15,999	35.47
Total votes		45,111	100
Republican hold			

106th District
Party	Candidate	Votes	%
Republican	Sue Allor^{1}	26,498	61.01
Democratic	Lora Greene	16,935	38.99
Total votes		43,433	100
Republican hold			

107th District
Party	Candidate	Votes	%
Republican	Lee Chatfield^{1}	24,834	58.73
Democratic	Joanne Schmidt Galloway	17,448	41.27
Total votes		42,282	100
Republican hold			

108th District
Party	Candidate	Votes	%
Republican	Beau LaFave^{1}	22,431	61.64
Democratic	Bob Romps	13,958	38.36
Total votes		36,389	100
Republican hold			

Results by county Cambensy: 50–60%; 60–70%; Wagner: 50–60%; 60–70%

Results by precinct Cambensy: 50–60%; 60–70%; 70–80%; Wagner: 50–60%; 60–70%; 70–80%; Tie: 50%

109th District
Party	Candidate	Votes	%
Democratic	Sara Cambensy^{1}	21,669	58.09
Republican	Melody Wagner	15,631	41.91
Total votes		37,300	100
Democratic hold			

Results by county Markkanen: 50–60%; Summers: 50–60%

Results by precinct Markkanen: 50–60%; 60–70%; Summers: 50–60%; 60–70%; 70–80%; Tie: 50%

110th District
Party	Candidate	Votes	%
Republican	Gregory Markkanen	17,980	50.82
Democratic	Ken Summers	17,401	49.18
Total votes		35,381	100
Republican gain from Democratic			

== See also ==
- 2018 Michigan Senate election
