= John Roth (politician) =

American politician

Member of the Michigan House of Representatives from the 104th district
- Incumbent
- Assumed office January 1, 2021
- Preceded by: Larry Inman

Personal details
- Party: Republican
- Children: 2
- Education: Northwestern Michigan College
- Website: Official website

John Roth is an American Republican politician from Michigan. He was elected to the Michigan House of Representatives from the 104th district in 2020.

== Political career ==
Roth successfully ran for the 104th district in the Michigan House of Representatives in the 2020 election. He was reelected in 2022 and in 2024.
