= Jason Allen (politician) =

American politician (born 1963)

Member of the Michigan Senate from the 37th district
- In office January 1, 2003 – December 31, 2010
- Preceded by: Walter H. North
- Succeeded by: Howard Walker

Member of the Michigan House of Representatives from the 104th district
- In office January 1, 1999 – December 31, 2002
- Preceded by: Michelle McManus
- Succeeded by: Howard Walker

Personal details
- Born: March 13, 1963 (age 63) Fort Wayne, Indiana, U.S.
- Party: Republican
- Spouse: Suzanne
- Education: Northwestern Michigan College; Miami University (BA)

Jason Allen (born March 13, 1963) is an American politician. He served as a Republican member of the Michigan House of Representatives from 1999 to 2002 and a member of the state senate from 2003 to 2010. He represented the 37th district, which includes Grand Traverse, Antrim, Charlevoix, Emmet, Cheboygan, Presque Isle, Chippewa and Mackinac Counties.

After leaving the state legislature, Allen served as a senior policy advisor for the Michigan Veterans Affairs Agency, Department of Military and Veterans Affairs, State of Michigan. He served as the Michigan state director for USDA Rural Development during the first Trump administration.

Allen was a candidate for the U.S. House of Representatives from Michigan's 1st congressional district in 2010 and 2016, but lost the Republican primary both times.

== Early life and education ==
Born in Fort Wayne, Indiana, Allen is a moved to Traverse City, Michigan, at a young age. After graduating high school he attended Northwestern Michigan College. From there he completed his education at Miami University in Oxford, Ohio, where he earned a bachelor's degree in Finance. He then returned to his hometown and began a job at his family's menswear business, Captain’s Quarters, located in downtown Traverse City. He has served in the Michigan National Guard with the rank of E4 specialist and is a member of the American Legion. Allen has also remained active in his community. As an Eagle Scout he continues to help out with scouting activities, serving on the President Ford Executive Board and counseling merit badges.

== Political career ==
Prior to becoming a senator in 2002, Allen served as a member of the Michigan House of Representatives for the 104th District from 1999 to 2002. In 2000 and 2004, he was named the Advocate of the Year by the Michigan Manufacturers Association.

He has been a member a member of the Grand Traverse County Board of Commissioners, Great Lakes Community Health Board and Northwestern Michigan Council of Government. He is also a member of Ducks Unlimited, Michigan Whitetails, the Ruffed Grouse Society, the American Legion and a Life Member of the National Rifle Association of America.

Allen is pro-life and supports lower taxes, reducing government regulation and the right to bear arms. In 2016, Allen signed the Americans for Tax Reform Taxpayer Protection Pledge, committing to opposing tax increases.

On November 6, 2017, the Trump Administration announced the appointment of Jason Allen as the new state director for USDA Rural Development in Michigan.

== Congressional campaigns ==
Allen unsuccessfully sought the Republican nomination for Congress in the 2010 primary election, losing by fifteen votes out of 70,996 total votes cast. Allen chose not to request a recount, saying he did not want to put either the party or the district through the lengthy and costly process.

He ran in 2016 for the Republican nomination for the open congressional seat. He was defeated in the Republican primary by Jack Bergman, who also won the general election in November 2016.
