= Rodney Wakeman =

American politician from Michigan

Member of the Michigan House of Representatives from the 94th district
- Incumbent
- Assumed office January 9, 2019
- Preceded by: Tim Kelly

Personal details
- Born: October 18, 1966 (age 59) Saginaw, Michigan, U.S.
- Party: Republican
- Education: Wayne State University School of Mortuary Science
- Occupation: Funeral director, politician
- Website: Official Website

Rodney Charles Wakeman (born October 18, 1966) is an American politician and funeral director from Michigan. Wakeman is a Republican member of the Michigan House of Representatives for District 94.

== Early life and education ==
Wakeman was born on October 18, 1966, in Saginaw, Michigan. In 1988, Wakeman earned a degree in Mortuary Science from Wayne State University.

== Career ==
Wakeman was a contributing photographer for The Township Times. Wakeman is a businessman in the funeral industry. Since 1984, Wakeman is a co-owner and funeral home director of Wakeman Funeral Home, a family business.

Wakeman's opponent in the 2018 Michigan House of Representatives Republican primary election, Steve Gerhardt, requested a recount after Wakeman's close victory in the election. On September 5, 2018, the recount confirmed Wakeman won by 30 votes.

On November 6, 2018, Wakeman won the election and became a Republican member of the Michigan House of Representatives for District 94. Wakeman defeated Dave Adams with 55% of the votes.

== See also ==
- 2018 Michigan House of Representatives election

Political offices
Preceded by Tim Kelly	Michigan Representatives; 94th District; 2019–present	Succeeded by Incumbent
