= Larry C. Inman =

American politician from Michigan

Larry Inman

Member of the Michigan House of Representatives from the 104th district
- In office January 1, 2015 – January 1, 2021
- Preceded by: Wayne Schmidt
- Succeeded by: John Roth

Personal details
- Born: Larry Charles Inman; April 10, 1954 (age 72)
- Party: Republican
- Education: Northwestern Michigan College; Northern Michigan University
- Website: Official website

Larry Charles Inman (born April 10, 1954) is an American politician in the Republican Party who formerly represented the 104th District—which includes Grand Traverse County—in the Michigan House of Representatives after being elected in November 2014.

== Personal life ==
Inman earned as associate of science degree from Northwestern Michigan College in 1974 and a bachelor of science from Northern Michigan University in 1976.

He is a collector, historian, and educator on Amelia Earhart. Inman has been involved with efforts to create a traveling museum exhibit on her life and disappearance, and also efforts to locate Earhart's plane. He was previously interested in the RMS Titanic but shifted his interest to Earhart after the Titanic was located in 1985. According to Inman, as of July 2015, he has spent US$1.5 million on Earhart collectibles.

Inman has volunteered for Junior Achievement and the Grand Traverse Bay YMCA. He also spent time as a volunteer probation officer for Michigan's 86th District Court and served on Northwestern Michigan College's Curriculum Advisory Committee.

== Professional life ==
Inman had a brief internship in the Michigan Attorney General's Consumer Protection Division. In 1979, he began working for the Huntington National Bank (then Empire National Bank of Traverse City) as a loan adjustor. He retired in 2007 as vice president, commercial loan officer - sales executive senior.

== Public office ==
Inman was elected to the Grand Traverse County Board of Commissioners in 1992 and served for 22 years. As a commissioner, he was elected to serve on the Michigan Association of Counties Board of Directors from 1998 to 2004, and served as president from 2002 to 2003. He also served on the National Association of Counties Board of Directors from 2002 to 2004, and the association's Finance and Intergovernmental Affairs Board from 2005 to 2014, including as chair from 2005 to 2006 and 2009 to 2011.

He served on the Northwest Regional Airport Commission of Cherry Capital Airport from 2007 to 2014, serving as chair of the board in 2008 and 2011. Inman was appointed to serve on the State of Michigan Community Corrections Board in Lansing from 1994 to 2014, serving as chair from 1999 to 2014. He served on the Northwest Michigan Council of Governments Board of Directors from 1998 to 2014, serving as chair from 2003 to 2014. Inman served on the Northern Michigan University Board of Trustees from 2002 to 2006 and again from 2009 to 2010.

=== Michigan House of Representatives ===
In November 2014, Inman was elected to a two-year term, beginning January 2015, representing the 104th District in the Michigan House of Representatives.

In the House, Inman chairs the Appropriations Subcommittee on the Department of Military and Veterans Affairs and is vice chair of the Appropriations Subcommittee on the Department of Natural Resources. He also serves on the House Committee on Appropriations and the Appropriations Subcommittee on Community Colleges. Following his indictment, Inman has been removed from all committees.

=== Alleged abuse of office ===
Inman was indicted on May 14, 2019 for seeking campaign donations from unions in exchange for "no" votes on repealing Michigan's prevailing wage law. Inman allegedly texted at least two union representatives opposed to the repeal to ask for campaign contributions to oppose the law, and stated "We never had this discussion." The unions made no donations to Inman, and Inman ultimately voted against the union and with the majority to repeal the labor rights law. Prosecutors also claim that one union representative recorded a phone call with the representative on the same subject. Charges include extortion by using his authority as an elected representative, soliciting a bribe by corruptly soliciting a campaign contribution and knowingly making a false statement to the FBI. These charges carry sentences of up to twenty, ten and five years respectively. Shortly after the indictment, Inman was stripped of all of his committee assignments, was voted out of the House Republican caucus and banned from using his office or staff.

In a public statement, Inman maintained his innocence, saying "I have never compromised the integrity of my vote on any issue. I have always represented my constituency honestly and legally. I intend on vigorously defending these charges and my reputation." Michigan House Speaker Republican Lee Chatfield asked for Inman's resignation following the indictment.

==== Calls for Resignation ====
In June 2019, Chatfield and House Minority Leader Christine Greig, co-sponsored a resolution asking Inman to resign or face possible expulsion from the House of Representatives. On June 6, 2019, Inman announced via his lawyer that he was going to seek treatment for possible addiction to prescription opiates. Chatfield said he would delay expulsion proceedings as Inman began his treatment but reiterated that he thinks Inman should resign. On August 29, 2019, the Michigan House of Representatives approved a resolution calling on Inman to resign by a 98-8 tally.

Inman's trial began on December 3, 2019, in the United States District Court for the Western District of Michigan before Chief Judge Robert Jonker. Inman was acquitted of a charge of lying to the FBI on December 10, 2019, with a mistrial being declared on charges of attempted extortion and soliciting a bribe after the jury was not able to reach a unanimous verdict. At a status hearing on the case in January 2020, federal prosecutors announced intentions to proceed with a re-trial, saying the government felt "entitled" to a retrial and that prosecutors had been contacted by a juror from the case, who alleged potential misconduct from other jurors on the case. Jonker questioned if a second trial was "mandated" and wondered if the charges could have a "chilling effect" on other politicians who have a constitutional right to raise money for their campaigns. Jonker is expected to make a decision if there will be a new trial by the summer of 2020.

Despite the acquittal, when Inman returned to the legislature, he was still prohibited from using his office or staff and was not allowed back on any of his committees or to rejoin the Republican Caucus. Inman has stated he plans to ask Chatfield to give him back his access to his office and staff, stating the office belongs to the constituents of Grand Traverse County and that he has yet to be convicted of a crime.

=== Recall effort ===
In August 2019, the Board of State Canvassers certified language allowing a group to collect signatures to potentially trigger a recall election to remove Inman from office. In November 2019, the recall petition was dismissed by state officials after the petition that was circulated to be signed was missing one word that was on the language that was approved by the Board of State Canvassers. State Elections Director Sally Williams said that there was no wiggle room and that the petition language must match the previously approved reasons for a recall. Nearly 14,000 signatures were collected from his district, which would have been more than enough to trigger a recall election.

On December 2, 2019, the Inman Recall Committee, the group who circulated the recall petitions, filed an appeal asking for emergency relief so the group could move forward with plans for a recall election and have it placed on the March 2020 ballot, alongside Michigan's Presidential primary elections. The Michigan Court of Appeals upheld the ruling on December 20, 2019. On December 30, 2019, the recall effort was revived by the Michigan Supreme Court, saying that despite the typo, the reasons circulated on the petitions weren't different from what was approved.

The recall effort was officially denied after the state Bureau of Elections found organizers had collected 11,993 valid signatures, 208 short of the minimum 12,201 required to trigger a recall election.

Inman was succeeded by John Roth.

== Awards and recognition ==
Inman received the Northwestern Michigan College Outstanding Alumni Award in 2005 and the Northern Michigan University Distinguished Alumni Award in 2008.
