= 2006 Michigan House of Representatives election =

- November 7, 2006

All 110 seats in the Michigan House of Representatives 56 seats needed for a majority
	Majority party	Minority party
Leader	Andy Dillon	Craig DeRoche
Party	Democratic	Republican
Leader's seat	17th district	38th district
Seats before	52	58
Seats after	58	52
Seat change	▲6	▼6
Popular vote	2,225,870	1,715,718
Percentage	56.17%	43.30%
- Results: Democratic gain Republican hold Democratic hold
Speaker before election
Craig DeRoche
Republican
Elected Speaker
Andy Dillon
Democratic

The 2006 Michigan House of Representatives elections were held on November 7, 2006, with partisan primaries to select the parties' nominees in the various districts on August 8, 2006.

== Predictions ==
Source	Ranking	As of
Rothenberg	Lean R	November 4, 2006

== Results ==
=== Districts 1–28 ===
1st district (Wayne (Harper Woods, Grosse Pointe Woods, Grosse Pointe Township, Grosse Pointe Farms, Grosse Pointe, Grosse Pointe Park, far east Detroit))
Party	Candidate	Votes	%
Republican	Ed Gaffney (incumbent)	19,500	51.96
Democratic	Tim Bledsoe	17,374	46.3
Green	Kristen Hamel	652	1.74
Total votes		37,526	100.0
Republican hold			

2nd district (Wayne (northeast Detroit))
Party	Candidate	Votes	%
Democratic	LaMar Lemmons (incumbent)	16,110	95.89
Republican	Edith Floyd	690	4.11
Total votes		16,800	100.0
Democratic hold			

3rd district (Wayne (southeast Detroit))
Party	Candidate	Votes	%
Democratic	Bettie Cook Scott	17,623	94.41
Republican	Shirley Lamar	694	3.72
Green	Fred Vitale	350	1.87
Total votes		18,667	100.0
Democratic hold			

4th district (Wayne (south-central Detroit))
Party	Candidate	Votes	%
Democratic	Coleman Young II	18,841	93.9
Republican	Scott Withington	1,225	6.1
Total votes		20,066	100.0
Democratic hold			

5th district (Wayne (north Detroit, Highland Park, Hamtramck))
Party	Candidate	Votes	%
Democratic	Bert Johnson	15,698	100
Total votes		15,698	100.0
Democratic hold			

6th district (Wayne (south-central Detroit))
Party	Candidate	Votes	%
Democratic	Marsha Cheeks (incumbent)	18,373	95.27
Republican	Charity Renee Jones	912	4.73
Total votes		19,285	100.0
Democratic hold			

7th district (Wayne (north-central Detroit))
Party	Candidate	Votes	%
Democratic	Virgil Smith, Jr. (incumbent)	21,083	97.21
Green	Derek Grigsby	605	2.79
Total votes		21,688	100.0
Democratic hold			

8th district (Wayne (northwest Detroit))
Party	Candidate	Votes	%
Democratic	George Cushingberry, Jr. (incumbent)	28,241	96.71
Republican	Melvin Byrd	961	3.29
Total votes		29,202	100.0
Democratic hold			

9th district (Wayne (far northwest Detroit))
Party	Candidate	Votes	%
Democratic	Shanelle Jackson	23,234	93.72
Independent	Ron March	1,556	6.28
Total votes		24,790	100.0
Democratic hold			

10th district (Wayne (west Detroit))
Party	Candidate	Votes	%
Democratic	Gabe Leland (incumbent)	17,885	93.9
Republican	Thomas Schaut	1,161	6.1
Total votes		19,046	100.0
Democratic hold			

11th district (Wayne (west-central Detroit))
Party	Candidate	Votes	%
Democratic	Morris Hood (incumbent)	21,489	100
Total votes		21,489	100.0
Democratic hold			

12th district (Wayne (southwest Detroit))
Party	Candidate	Votes	%
Democratic	Steve Tobocman (incumbent)	9,365	95.67
Libertarian	Raymond Warner	424	4.33
Total votes		9,789	100.0
Democratic hold			

13th district (Wayne (Riverview, Southgate, Trenton, Wyandotte))
Party	Candidate	Votes	%
Democratic	Barbara Farrah	22,411	69.36
Republican	Darrell Stasik	9,902	30.64
Total votes		32,313	100.0
Democratic hold			

14th district (Wayne (Ecorse, Lincoln Park, Melvindale, River Rouge, south Allen Park))
Party	Candidate	Votes	%
Democratic	Ed Clemente	21,767	78.28
Republican	Dave Stone	6,038	21.72
Total votes		27,805	100.0
Democratic hold			

15th district (Wayne (Dearborn—excluding northeast tip))
Party	Candidate	Votes	%
Democratic	Gino Polidori (incumbent)	21,391	76
Republican	Abbas Ghasham	6,755	24
Total votes		28,146	100.0
Democratic hold			

16th district (Wayne (north Allen Park, Dearborn Heights--southwest tip, Garden City, Inkster))
Party	Candidate	Votes	%
Democratic	Bob Constan	19,274	73.36
Republican	Jeremy DeLozier	7,000	26.64
Total votes		26,274	100.0
Democratic hold			

17th district (Wayne (Dearborn Heights—excluding southwest tip, Livonia--southeast tip, Redford Township))
Party	Candidate	Votes	%
Democratic	Andy Dillon (incumbent)	25,157	77.42
Republican	Zhelinrentice Clampitt	7,336	22.58
Total votes		32,493	100.0
Democratic hold			

18th district (Wayne (Westland))
Party	Candidate	Votes	%
Democratic	Richard LeBlanc	19,065	73.12
Republican	Sam Durante	6,298	24.16
Constitution	Harold Dunn	710	2.72
Total votes		26,073	100.0
Democratic hold			

19th district (Wayne (Livonia—excluding southeast tip))
Party	Candidate	Votes	%
Republican	John R. Pastor (incumbent)	22,627	55.19
Democratic	Brian Duggan	18,372	44.81
Total votes		40,999	100.0
Republican hold			

20th district (Wayne (Northville--portion within county, Northville Township, Plymouth, Plymouth Township, east Canton Township, Wayne))
Party	Candidate	Votes	%
Democratic	Marc Corriveau	20,051	51.16
Republican	Mark Abbo	19,140	48.84
Total votes		39,191	100.0
Democratic gain from Republican			

21st district (Wayne (Belleville, Van Buren Township, Canton Township—excluding eastern slice))
Party	Candidate	Votes	%
Republican	Phil LaJoy (incumbent)	21,478	56.16
Democratic	Al Sinis	16,769	43.84
Total votes		38,247	100.0
Republican hold			

22nd district (Wayne (Romulus, Taylor))
Party	Candidate	Votes	%
Democratic	Hoon-Yung Hopgood (incumbent)	19,259	73.97
Republican	Ben Armstrong	5,882	22.59
Constitution	Rick Butkowski	895	3.44
Total votes		26,036	100.0
Democratic hold			

23rd district (Wayne (Brownstown Township, Flat Rock, Gibraltar, Grosse Ile Township, Huron Township, Rockwood, Sumpter Township, Woodhaven))
Party	Candidate	Votes	%
Democratic	Kathleen Law	21,636	63.05
Republican	Linda Bostic	12,677	36.95
Total votes		34,313	100.0
Democratic hold			

24th district (Macomb (Harrison Township, Lake Township, St. Clair Shores))
Party	Candidate	Votes	%
Republican	Jack Brandenburg (incumbent)	22,256	59.34
Democratic	Karen Abdella	14,640	39.04
Constitution	Frederick Powell	608	1.62
Total votes		37,504	100.0
Republican hold			

25th district (Macomb (south Sterling Heights, north Warren))
Party	Candidate	Votes	%
Democratic	Steve Bieda (incumbent)	22,652	67.41
Republican	Cecil St. Pierre	100,156	30.22
Libertarian	Michael Brylewski	795	2.37
Total votes		123,603	100.0
Democratic hold			

26th district (Oakland (Madison Heights, Royal Oak))
Party	Candidate	Votes	%
Democratic	Marie Donigan (incumbent)	22,077	62.2
Republican	Kevin Konczal	12,357	34.82
Libertarian	James Young	1,057	2.98
Total votes		35,491	100.0
Democratic hold			

27th district (Oakland (Berkley, Ferndale, Hazel Park, Huntington Woods, north Oak Park, Pleasant Ridge))
Party	Candidate	Votes	%
Democratic	Andy Meisner (incumbent)	27,288	78.89
Republican	Will Sears	7,304	21.11
Total votes		34,592	100.0
Democratic hold			

28th district (Macomb (south Warren, Center Line))
Party	Candidate	Votes	%
Democratic	Lisa Wojno (incumbent)	19,957	75.18
Republican	Timothy Knue	6,589	24.82
Total votes		26,546	100.0
Democratic hold			

=== Districts 29–55 ===
29th district (Oakland (Auburn Hills, Pontiac))
Party	Candidate	Votes	%
Democratic	Tim Melton	3,740	61.95
Republican	Tom March	2,297	38.05
Total votes		6,037	100.0
Democratic hold			

30th district (Macomb (north Sterling Heights, Utica))
Party	Candidate	Votes	%
Republican	Tory Rocca (incumbent)	19,387	59.74
Democratic	Rose Marie Fessler	13,066	40.26
Total votes		32,453	100.0
Republican hold			

31st district (Macomb (Clinton Township—excluding northeast portion, north Fraser, Mount Clemens))
Party	Candidate	Votes	%
Democratic	Fred Miller	18,583	62.55
Republican	Daniel Tollis	10,348	34.83
Libertarian	James Miller	777	2.62
Total votes		29,708	100.0
Democratic hold			

32nd district (Macomb (Armada Township, Chesterfield Township, Lenox Township, south Memphis, New Baltimore, Richmond—excluding portion outside county, Richmond Township), St. Clair (Columbus Township, Ira Township, Kimball Township, Wales Township))
Party	Candidate	Votes	%
Republican	Dan Acciavatti	20,716	58.76
Democratic	Jill Lezotte	13,841	39.26
Libertarian	Joseph Zemens	701	1.99
Total votes		35,258	100.0
Republican hold			

33rd district (Macomb (Macomb Township, Ray Township, northwest Clinton Township))
Party	Candidate	Votes	%
Republican	Kimberly Meltzer	21,753	53.59
Democratic	Gary Cynowa	18,838	46.41
Total votes		40,591	100.0
Republican hold			

34th district (Genesee (north Flint))
Party	Candidate	Votes	%
Democratic	Brenda Clack (incumbent)	18,454	90.46
Republican	Ronald Arnott	1,946	9.54
Total votes		20,400	100.0
Democratic hold			

35th district (Oakland (Lathrup Village, southwest Oak Park, Royal Oak Township, Southfield))
Party	Candidate	Votes	%
Democratic	Paul Condino	31,507	89.14
Republican	Marc Zwick	3,837	10.86
Total votes		35,344	100.0
Democratic hold			

36th district (Macomb (Bruce Township, Shelby Township, Washington Township))
Party	Candidate	Votes	%
Republican	Brian Palmer	23,619	60.96
Democratic	Robert Murphy	15,124	39.04
Total votes		38,743	100.0
Republican hold			

37th district (Oakland (Farmington, Farmington Hills))
Party	Candidate	Votes	%
Democratic	Aldo Vagnozzi (incumbent)	23,177	61.72
Republican	Dennis Malaney	14,375	38.28
Total votes		37,552	100.0
Democratic hold			

38th district (Oakland (Lyon Township, Northville-excluding portion outside county, Novi, Novi Township, South Lyon, Walled Lake, Wixom))
Party	Candidate	Votes	%
Republican	Craig DeRoche (incumbent)	22,310	59.93
Democratic	Tim Jarrell	14,914	40.07
Total votes		37,224	100.0
Republican hold			

39th district (Oakland (Commerce Township, south West Bloomfield Township))
Party	Candidate	Votes	%
Republican	David Law (incumbent)	19,566	50.23
Democratic	Lisa Brown	19,385	49.77
Total votes		38,951	100.0
Republican hold			

40th district (Oakland (Birmingham, Bloomfield Hills, Bloomfield Township, Keego Harbor, Orchard Lake Village, Southfield Township, Sylvan Lake))
Party	Candidate	Votes	%
Republican	Chuck Moss	28,092	65.37
Democratic	Syed Jafry	14,880	34.63
Total votes		42,972	100.0
Republican hold			

41st district (Oakland (Clawson, Troy))
Party	Candidate	Votes	%
Republican	Marty Knollenberg	21,458	58.52
Democratic	Eric Gregory	15,208	41.48
Total votes		36,666	100.0
Republican hold			

42nd district (Macomb (Eastpointe, south Fraser, Roseville))
Party	Candidate	Votes	%
Democratic	Frank Accavitti	21,718	73.11
Republican	Greg Fleming	7,285	24.52
Constitution	Brett Pfeil	703	
Total votes		29,706	100.0
Democratic hold			

43rd district (Oakland (Lake Angelus, Waterford Township, northwest West Bloomfield Township))
Party	Candidate	Votes	%
Republican	Fran Amos (incumbent)	19,286	58.99
Democratic	Kellie Riddell	13,406	41.01
Total votes		32,692	100.0
Republican hold			

44th district (Oakland (Highland Township, Independence Township, Springfield Township, Clarkston Village, White Lake Township))
Party	Candidate	Votes	%
Republican	John Stakoe	27,123	67.16
Democratic	Mark Venie	13,264	32.84
Total votes		40,387	100.0
Republican hold			

45th district (Oakland (Oakland Township, Rochester Hills, Rochester))
Party	Candidate	Votes	%
Republican	John Garfield	24,212	59.64
Democratic	Thomas Werth	16,385	40.36
Total votes		40,597	100.0
Republican hold			

46th district (Oakland (Addison Township, Brandon Township, Groveland Township, Holly Township, Orion Township, Oxford Township, Rose Township))
Party	Candidate	Votes	%
Republican	James Marleau (incumbent)	23,742	60.97
Democratic	Bill Pearson	15,196	39.03
Total votes		38,938	100.0
Republican hold			

47th district (Livingston (Cohoctah Township, Conway Township, Deerfield Township, Hamburg Township, Handy Township, Hartland Township, Howell, Howell Township, Iosco Township, Marion Township--small northeast portion, Putnam Township, Tyrone Township, Unadilla Township
Party	Candidate	Votes	%
Republican	Joe Hune (incumbent)	23,487	61.56
Democratic	Mary Andersson	14,664	38.44
Total votes		38,151	100.0
Republican hold			

48th district (Genesee (Clayton Township--northwest half, Clio, Flushing, Flushing Township, Montrose, Montrose Township, Mount Morris, Mount Morris Township, Thetford Township, Vienna Township))
Party	Candidate	Votes	%
Democratic	Richard Hammel	22,174	67.43
Republican	Dana Whitehead	10,711	32.57
Total votes		32,885	100.0
Democratic hold			

49th district (Genesee (Clayton Township--southeast half, south Flint, Flint Township, Gaines Township, Swartz Creek))
Party	Candidate	Votes	%
Democratic	Lee Gonzales (incumbent)	22,637	75.24
Republican	Bill Kelly	7,451	24.76
Total votes		30,088	100.0
Democratic hold			

50th district (Genesee (Burton, Davison, Davison Township, Genesee Township, Richfield Township))
Party	Candidate	Votes	%
Democratic	Ted Hammon	20,259	64.55
Republican	Fred Mac Fortner	11,126	35.45
Total votes		31,385	100.0
Democratic hold			

51st district (Genesee (Argentine Township, Atlas Township, Fenton, Fenton Township, Grand Blanc, Grand Blanc Township, Linden, Mundy Township))
Party	Candidate	Votes	%
Republican	Dave Robertson (incumbent)	21,812	50.8
Democratic	Fred Starzyk	21,125	49.2
Total votes		42,937	100.0
Republican hold			

52nd district (Washtenaw (north Ann Arbor, north Ann Arbor Township, Bridgewater Township, Dexter Township, Freedom Township, Lima Township, Lodi Township, Lyndon Township, Manchester Township, Northfield Township, Saline, Scio Township--most, Sharon Township, Sylvan T
Party	Candidate	Votes	%
Democratic	Pam Byrnes (incumbent)	280,446	62.61
Republican	Shannon Brown	16,747	37.39
Total votes		297,193	100.0
Democratic hold			

53rd district (Washtenaw (south Ann Arbor, south Ann Arbor Township))
Party	Candidate	Votes	%
Democratic	Rebekah Warren	36,979	80
Republican	Erik Sheagren	5,898	17.49
Independent	Matt Erard	847	2.51
Total votes		43,724	100.0
Democratic hold			

54th district (Washtenaw (Augusta Township, Salem Township, Superior Township, Ypsilanti, Ypsilanti Township))
Party	Candidate	Votes	%
Democratic	Alma Wheeler Smith (incumbent)	22,246	69.24
Republican	Tom Banks	9,036	28.12
Independent	David Helm	849	2.64
Total votes		32,131	100.0
Democratic hold			

55th district (Monroe (Beford Township, Dundee Township, Erie Township, Milan, Milan Township, Petersburg, Summerfield Township, Whiteford Township), Washtenaw (Milan, Pittsfield Township, Saline Township, York Township))
Party	Candidate	Votes	%
Democratic	Kathy Angerer (incumbent)	23,409	63.93
Republican	Matt Milosch	13,208	36.07
Total votes		36,617	100.0
Democratic hold			

=== Districts 56–83 ===
56th district (Monroe (Ash Township, Berlin Township, Exeter Township, Frenchtown Township, Ida Township, LaSalle Township, London Township, Luna Pier, Monroe, Monroe Township, Raisinville Township))
Party	Candidate	Votes	%
Democratic	Kate Ebli	16,133	46.63
Republican	John Manor	16,133	46.63
Total votes		32,266	100.0
Democratic hold			

57th district (Lenawee (excluding Cambridge Township))
Party	Candidate	Votes	%
Democratic	Dudley Spade (incumbent)	20,745	66.61
Republican	Jim Koehn	10,401	33.39
Total votes		31,146	100.0
Democratic hold			

58th district (Branch, Hillsdale)
Party	Candidate	Votes	%
Republican	Bruce Caswell (incumbent)	21,317	72.9
Democratic	Randy Smith	7,925	27.1
Total votes		29,242	100.0
Republican hold			

59th district (Cass (excluding Dowagiac, Howard Township, Niles, Silver Creek Township, Wayne Township), St. Joseph)
Party	Candidate	Votes	%
Republican	Rick Shaffer	19,028	66
Democratic	Ed Pawlowski	9,802	34
Total votes		28,830	100.0
Republican hold			

60th district (Kalamazoo (Cooper Township, Kalamazoo, east Kalamazoo Township))
Party	Candidate	Votes	%
Democratic	Robert Jones	18,925	70.76
Republican	Armando Romero	7,821	29.24
Total votes		26,746	100.0
Democratic hold			

61st district (Kalamazoo (Alamo Township, north Kalamazoo Township, Oshtemo Township, Parchment, Portage, Prairie Ronde Township, Texas Township))
Party	Candidate	Votes	%
Republican	Jack Hoogendyk (incumbent)	21,073	50.57
Democratic	Julie Rogers	20,600	49.43
Total votes		41,673	100.0
Republican hold			

62nd district (Calhoun (Albion, Albion Township, Battle Creek, Burlington Township, Clarence Township, Clarendon Township, Convis Township, Eckford Township, Fredonia Township, Homer Township, Lee Township, Leroy Township, Marengo Township, Sheridan Township, Springfie
Party	Candidate	Votes	%
Republican	Mike Nofs (incumbent)	15,643	53.62
Democratic	Lynn Haley	13,531	46.38
Total votes		29,174	100.0
Republican hold			

63rd district (Calhoun (Bedford Township, Emmet Township, Fredonia Township--part, Marshall--most, Marshall Township, Newton Township, Pennfield Township), Kalamazoo (Brady Township, Charleston Township, Climax Township, Comstock Township, Galesburg, Pavilion Township,
Party	Candidate	Votes	%
Republican	Lorence Wenke (incumbent)	21,261	55.07
Democratic	Phyllis Smith	17,349	44.93
Total votes		38,610	100.0
Republican hold			

64th district (Jackson (Concord Township, Hanover Township, Jackson, Napoleon Township, Parma Township, Pulaski Township, Sandstone Township, Spring Arbor Township, Summit Township))
Party	Candidate	Votes	%
Democratic	Martin Griffin	15,703	52.55
Republican	Rick Baxter	14,177	47.45
Total votes		29,880	100.0
Democratic hold			

65th district (Eaton (Brookfield Township, Eaton Rapids, Hamlin Township), Jackson (Blackman Township, Columbia Township, Grass Lake Township, Henrietta Township, Leoni Township, Liberty Township, Norvell Township, Rives Township, Springport Township, Tompkins Township
Party	Candidate	Votes	%
Democratic	Mike Simpson	16,721	52.51
Republican	Leslie Mortimer	15,123	47.49
Total votes		31,844	100.0
Democratic hold			

66th district (Livingston (Brighton, Brighton Township, Genoa Township, Green Oak Township, Marion Township--part, Oceola Township), Oakland (Milford Township))
Party	Candidate	Votes	%
Republican	Chris Ward	27,772	65.75
Democratic	Michael McGonegal	14,469	34.25
Total votes		42,241	100.0
Republican hold			

67th district (Ingham (Alaiedon Township, Aurelius Township, Bunker Hill Township, Delhi Charter Township, Ingham Township, southwest Lansing, Leroy Township, Leslie, Leslie Township, Locke Township, Mason, Onondaga Township, Stockbridge Township, Vevay Township, Wheat
Party	Candidate	Votes	%
Democratic	Barb Byrum	22,837	59.66
Republican	Donald Vickers	15,439	40.34
Total votes		38,276	100.0
Democratic hold			

68th district (Ingham (Lansing—excluding southwest portion, Lansing Township))
Party	Candidate	Votes	%
Democratic	Joan Bauer	22,830	74.32
Republican	Harilaos Sorovigas	6,073	19.77
Independent	Charles Ford	1,485	4.83
Constitution	DelRae Finnerty	331	1.08
Total votes		30,719	100.0
Democratic hold			

69th district (Ingham (east East Lansing, Williamston Township--most))
Party	Candidate	Votes	%
Democratic	Mark Meadows	21,962	67.69
Republican	John Knowles	10,485	32.31
Total votes		32,447	100.0
Democratic hold			

70th district (Ionia (Belding, Berlin Township--small part, Ionia, Ionia Township--part, Keene Township, Orleans Township, Otisco Township), Montcalm)
Party	Candidate	Votes	%
Republican	Judy Emmons (incumbent)	18,392	63.21
Democratic	Christopher Mahar	10,704	36.79
Total votes		29,096	100.0
Republican hold			

71st district (Eaton (excluding Brookfield Township, Eaton Rapids, Hamlin Township))
Party	Candidate	Votes	%
Republican	Rick Jones (incumbent)	23,711	58.49
Democratic	Victor Braatz	16,830	41.51
Total votes		40,541	100.0
Republican hold			

72nd district (Kent (Caledonia Township, Cascade Township, Gaines Township, Kentwood))
Party	Candidate	Votes	%
Republican	Glenn Steil	27,004	65.62
Democratic	Kyle Eric Hinton	13,054	31.72
Libertarian	William Wenzel	591	1.44
Constitution	William Mohr	500	1.22
Total votes		41,149	100.0
Republican hold			

73rd district (Kent (Algoma Township, Cannon Township, Cedar Springs, Courtland Township, Nelson Township, Oakfield Township, Plainfield Township, Rockford, Solon Township, Sparta Township, Spencer Township, Tyrone Township))
Party	Candidate	Votes	%
Republican	Tom Pearce	28,636	64.55
Democratic	Joseph Marckini	14,714	33.17
Libertarian	Steven Nickelson	1,010	2.28
Total votes		44,360	100.0
Republican hold			

74th district (Kent (Alpine Township, Grandville), Ottawa (Coopersville, Crockery Township, Georgetown Township, Polkton Township, Tallmadge Township, Wright Township))
Party	Candidate	Votes	%
Republican	David Agema	30,495	70.13
Democratic	Steven Kauffman	12,108	27.85
Libertarian	Tracey McLaughlin	880	2.02
Total votes		43,483	100.0
Republican hold			

75th district (Kent (east Grand Rapids))
Party	Candidate	Votes	%
Democratic	Robert Dean	17,462	51.33
Republican	Tim Doyle	15,964	46.93
Libertarian	Lauren Hillmer	592	1.74
Independent	Louise Jackson	0	0
Total votes		34,018	100.0
Democratic hold			

76th district (Kent (west Grand Rapids))
Party	Candidate	Votes	%
Democratic	Michael Sak (incumbent)	17,823	72.8
Republican	Ted Liberski	6,119	24.99
Libertarian	Matthew Friar	540	2.21
Total votes		24,482	100.0
Democratic hold			

77th district (Kent (Byron Township, Wyoming))
Party	Candidate	Votes	%
Republican	Kevin Green (incumbent)	21,350	67.47
Democratic	Daniel Ficeli	9,235	29.18
Libertarian	John Stedman	1,060	3.35
Total votes		31,645	100.0
Republican hold			

78th district (Berrien (Baroda Township, Berrien Township, Bertland Township, Buchanan, Buchanan Township, Chikaming Township, Galien Township, New Buffalo, New Buffalo Township, Niles, Niles Township, Oronoko Township, Pipestone Township, Three Oaks Township, Weesaw T
Party	Candidate	Votes	%
Republican	Neal Nitz (incumbent)	14,037	51.82
Democratic	Judy Truesdell	13,052	48.18
Total votes		27,089	100.0
Republican hold			

79th district (Berrien (Bainbridge Township, Benton Charter Township, Benton Harbor, Bridgeman, Coloma, Coloma Township, Hager Township, Lake Charter Township, Lincoln Township, Royalton Township, Sodus Township, St. Joseph Charter Township, St. Joseph, Watervliet, Wat
Party	Candidate	Votes	%
Republican	John Proos (incumbent)	19,660	65.02
Democratic	Janet King	10,576	34.98
Total votes		30,236	100.0
Republican hold			

80th district (Allegan (Otsego, Otsego Township, Watson Township), Van Buren)
Party	Candidate	Votes	%
Republican	Tonya Schuitmaker (incumbent)	18,264	61.49
Democratic	Jessie Olson	11,440	38.51
Total votes		29,704	100.0
Republican hold			

81st district (St. Clair (Algonac, Berlin Township, Brockway Township, Casco Township, China Township, Clay Township, Clyde Township, Cottrellville Township, East China Township, Emmet Township, Grant Township, Greenwood Township, Kenockee Township, Lynn Township, Mari
Party	Candidate	Votes	%
Republican	Phil Pavlov (incumbent)	22,365	60.15
Democratic	Dan Donnellon	14,816	39.85
Total votes		37,181	100.0
Republican hold			

82nd district (Lapeer)
Party	Candidate	Votes	%
Republican	John Stahl	18,629	53.33
Democratic	Dennis Harrand	15,021	43
Constitution	Brian Ervin	1,281	3.67
Total votes		34,931	100.0
Republican hold			

83rd district (Sanilac, St. Clair (Burtchville Township, Fort Gratiot Township, Port Huron))
Party	Candidate	Votes	%
Democratic	John Espinoza (incumbent)	22,318	73.02
Republican	Ed Smith	8,245	26.98
Total votes		30,563	100.0
Democratic hold			

=== Districts 84–110 ===
84th district (Huron, Tuscola)
Party	Candidate	Votes	%
Democratic	Terry Brown	18,421	51.46
Republican	John Hunt	17,378	48.54
Total votes		35,799	100.0
Democratic hold			

85th district (Clinton (Bath Township, Dewitt Township--part, Ovid Township, Victor Township, Shiawassee))
Party	Candidate	Votes	%
Republican	Dick Ball (incumbent)	18,982	55.31
Democratic	Judy Ford	15,337	44.69
Total votes		34,319	100.0
Republican hold			

86th district (Kent (Ada Township, Bowne Township, East Grand Rapids, north-central Grand Rapids, Grand Rapids Township, Grattan Township, Lowell, Lowell Township, Vergennes Township, Walker))
Party	Candidate	Votes	%
Republican	Dave Hildenbrand (incumbent)	28,716	64.36
Democratic	Melissa Casalina	15,085	33.81
Libertarian	Patricia Steinport	819	1.84
Total votes		44,620	100.0
Republican hold			

87th district (Barry, Ionia (Berlin Township--most, Boston Township, Campbell Township, Danby Township, Ionia--small part, Ionia Township--most, Lyons Township, North Plains Township, Odessa Township, Orange Township, Portland, Portland Township, Ronald Township, Sebew
Party	Candidate	Votes	%
Republican	Brian Calley	21,527	56.36
Democratic	Doug Kalnbach	15,504	40.56
Constitution	Walt Herwath	1,195	3.13
Total votes		38,226	100.0
Republican hold			

88th district (Allegan (excluding Watson Township, Otsego, Otsego Township))
Party	Candidate	Votes	%
Republican	Fulton Sheen	23,633	61.08
Democratic	Gery Weichman	14,059	36.34
Green	Pete Van	999	2.58
Total votes		38,691	100.0
Republican hold			

89th district (Ottawa (Allendale Township, Ferrysburg, Grand Haven, Grand Haven Township, Olive Township, Park Township, Port Sheldon Township, Robinson Township, Spring Lake Township))
Party	Candidate	Votes	%
Republican	Arlan Meekhof	22,921	60.6
Democratic	Don Bergman	13,322	35.22
Total votes		36,243	100.0
Republican hold			

90th district (Ottawa (Blendon, Holland--part within county, Holland Township, Hudsonville, Jamestown Township, Zeeland, Zeeland Township))
Party	Candidate	Votes	%
Republican	Bill Huizenga (incumbent)	27,338	78.27
Democratic	Clay Stauffer	7,590	21.73
Total votes		34,928	100.0
Republican hold			

91st district (Muskegon (Blue Lake Township, Casnovia Township, Cedar Creek Township, Dalton Township, Egelston Township, Fruitport Township, Holton Township, Montague, Montague Township, Moorland Township, Ravenna Township, Roosevelt Park, Sullivan Township, White Riv
Party	Candidate	Votes	%
Democratic	Mary Valentine	20,494	55.93
Republican	David Farhat	16,148	44.07
Total votes		36,642	100.0
Democratic hold			

92nd district (Muskegon (Fruitland Township, Laketon Township, Muskegon Heights, Muskegon, Muskegon Township, North Muskegon))
Party	Candidate	Votes	%
Democratic	Doug Bennett (incumbent)	18,700	70.38
Republican	Marianne Harris-Darnell	7,870	29.62
Total votes		26,570	100.0
Democratic hold			

93rd district (Clinton (excluding Ovid Township, Victor Township, Bath Township, Dewitt Township--part), Gratiot)
Party	Candidate	Votes	%
Republican	Paul Opsommer	21,284	56.24
Democratic	Ronald McComb	16,564	43.76
Total votes		37,848	100.0
Republican hold			

94th district (Saginaw (Albee Township, Birch Run Township, Blumfield Township, Chesaning Township, Frankenmuth, Frankenmuth Township, James Township, Maple Grove Township, Saginaw Township, St. Charles Township, Swan Creek Township, Taymouth Township, Thomas Township)
Party	Candidate	Votes	%
Republican	Ken Horn	21,090	53.14
Democratic	Bob Blaine	18,595	46.86
Total votes		39,685	100.0
Republican hold			

95th district (Saginaw (Bridgeport Township, Buena Vista Township, Saginaw, Spaulding Township))
Party	Candidate	Votes	%
Democratic	Andy Coulouris	18,986	81.43
Republican	Joel Wilson	4,329	18.57
Independent	Wilfred Beal		
Total votes		23,315	100.0
Democratic hold			

96th district (Bay (Auburn, Bangor Township, Bay City, Beaver Township, Essexville, Frankenlust Township, Hampton Township, Merritt Township, Midland—portion within county, Monitor Township, Portsmouth Township, Williams Township))
Party	Candidate	Votes	%
Democratic	Jeff Mayes (incumbent)	27,188	73.39
Republican	Eric Schaefer	9,857	26.61
Total votes		37,045	100.0
Democratic hold			

97th district (Arenac, Bay (Fraser Township, Garfield Township, Gibson Township, Kawkawlin Township, Mount Forest Township, Pinconning, Pinconning Township), Clare, Gladwin)
Party	Candidate	Votes	%
Republican	Tim Moore (incumbent)	18,887	53.65
Democratic	David Schwab	16,315	46.35
Total votes		35,202	100.0
Republican hold			

98th district (Midland (Homer Township, Ingersoll Township, Larkin Township—small part, Lincoln Township—small part, Midland—almost all, Midland Township, Mount Haley Township), Saginaw (Brady Township, Brant Township, Carrollton Township, Chapin Township, Fremont Town
Party	Candidate	Votes	%
Republican	John Moolenaar (incumbent)	21,578	61.39
Democratic	Jan Taylor Sutherland	13,572	38.61
Total votes		35,150	100.0
Republican hold			

99th district (Isabella, Midland (Coleman, Edenville Township, Geneva Township, Greendale Township, Hope Township, Jasper Township, Jerome Township, Larkin Township—almost all, Lee Township, Lincoln Township—almost all, Mills Township, Porter Township, Warren Township)
Party	Candidate	Votes	%
Republican	Bill Caul	17,198	57.65
Democratic	Loren Partlo	12,632	42.35
Total votes		29,830	100.0
Republican hold			

100th district (Lake, Newaygo, Oceana)
Party	Candidate	Votes	%
Republican	Goeff Hansen (incumbent)	19,138	58.48
Democratic	Bill Richards	13,590	41.52
Total votes		32,728	100.0
Republican hold			

101st district (Benzie, Leelanau, Manistee, Mason)
Party	Candidate	Votes	%
Republican	David Palsrok	21,779	51.96
Democratic	Daniel Scripps	20,132	48.04
Total votes		41,911	100.0
Republican hold			

102nd district (Mecosta, Osceola, Wexford)
Party	Candidate	Votes	%
Republican	Darwin L. Booher (incumbent)	21,633	62
Democratic	Nate Heffron	13,257	38
Total votes		34,890	100.0
Republican hold			

103rd district (Iosco, Missaukee, Ogemaw, Roscommon)
Party	Candidate	Votes	%
Democratic	Joel Sheltrown (incumbent)	25,155	68.69
Republican	Raymond Moore	11,468	31.31
Total votes		36,623	100.0
Democratic hold			

104th district (Grand Traverse, Kalkaska)
Party	Candidate	Votes	%
Republican	Howard Walker (incumbent)	24,385	58.46
Democratic	Roman Grucz	17,328	41.54
Total votes		41,713	100.0
Republican hold			

105th district (Antrim, Charlevoix, Cheboygan (excluding Koehler Township, Tuscarora Township), Otsego)
Party	Candidate	Votes	%
Republican	Kevin Elsenheimer (incumbent)	26,291	64.24
Democratic	Tom Bauer	14,635	35.76
Total votes		40,926	100.0
Republican hold			

106th district (Alcona, Alpena, Crawford, Montmorency, Oscoda, Presque Isle)
Party	Candidate	Votes	%
Democratic	Matt Gillard (incumbent)	23,675	64.86
Republican	Howard Viegelahn	12,827	35.14
Total votes		36,502	100.0
Democratic hold			

107th district (Cheboygan (Koehler Township, Tuscarora Township), Chippewa, Emmet, Mackinac)
Party	Candidate	Votes	%
Democratic	Gary McDowell (incumbent)	20,286	59.49
Republican	Michael Duggan	13,816	40.51
Total votes		34,102	100.0
Democratic hold			

108th district (Delta, Dickinson, Menominee)
Party	Candidate	Votes	%
Republican	Tom Casperson (incumbent)	17,816	55.48
Democratic	Judy Nerat	14,297	44.52
Total votes		32,113	100.0
Republican hold			

109th district (Alger, Luce, Marquette (excluding Powell Township, West Branch Township), Schoolcraft)
Party	Candidate	Votes	%
Democratic	Steven Lindberg	21,398	67.07
Republican	Joel Westrom	10,504	32.93
Total votes		31,902	100.0
Democratic hold			

110th district (Baraga, Gogebic, Houghton, Iron, Keweenaw, Marquette (Powell Township), Ontonagon)
Party	Candidate	Votes	%
Democratic	Michael Lahti	19,361	63.4
Republican	Dave Schmidt	10,357	33.92
Constitution	James Niemela	820	2.69
Total votes		30,538	100.0
Democratic hold			

== See also ==
- 2006 Michigan Senate election
