= Josephine Drivinski Hunsinger =

American politician from Michigan

Josephine D. Hunsinger
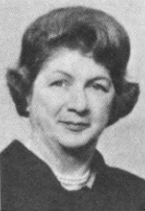

Member of the Michigan House of Representatives
- In office January 1, 1955 – December 31, 1976
- Preceded by: William R. Bryant, Jr.
- Succeeded by: Michael J. Bennane
- Constituency: Wayne County 12th district (1955-1964); 16th district (1965-1972); 1st district (1973-1976)

Personal details
- Born: October 28, 1914 Acosta, Pennsylvania, U.S.
- Died: October 5, 2010 (aged 95) Union Lake, Michigan, U.S.
- Spouse: Raymond L. Hunsinger (m. 1930; died 1994)
- Children: Irene K. Hunsinger
- Parents: Joseph Drzewienski (father); Catherine Moskal (mother)

Josephine Drivinski Hunsinger (October 28, 1914 – October 5, 2010) was a representative for the 1st district of the Michigan House of Representatives from January 1, 1973, to December 31, 1976.

== Personal life ==
Josephine Drivinski Hunsinger (née Srivinski) was born on October 28, 1914, to Joseph Drzewienski and Catherine Moskal in Acosta, Somerset, Pennsylvania. She is the 2nd oldest child of 6. She has an older sister named Pauline Drivinski (1911-1985), 1 younger sister named Veronica Drivinski (1921-1983), and 3 younger brothers named John (1916-1988), Stanley (1918-2009), and Edward Drivinski(1923-1995).

She married Raymond L. Hunsinger and had 1 daughter named Irene K. Hunsinger (1931-).
