= Michigan's 1st House of Representatives district =

American legislative district

Michigan's 1st State House of Representatives district
Representative
| Tyrone Carter; D–Detroit |
- Demographics: 19% White; 29.4% Black; 47% Hispanic; 0.2% Asian; 0.2% Native American; 0.7% Other; 3.4% Multiracial
- Population (2024): 89,290

Michigan's 1st House of Representatives district is a legislative district within the Michigan House of Representatives located in Wayne County. The district was created in 1965, when the Michigan Supreme Court ordered the reapportionment of state legislative districts from a county-based system to a proportional one following the Supreme Court case Reynolds v. Sims. It is currently represented by Democrat Tyrone Carter of Detroit.

== List of representatives ==
| Representative | Party | Years | Residence | Notes |
|---|---|---|---|---|
| Robert E. Waldron | Republican | 1965–1970 | Grosse Pointe | Reapportioned from the former Wayne County, 13th district. |
| William R. Bryant Jr. | Republican | 1971–1972 | Grosse Pointe Farms | Redistricted to the 13th district. |
| Josephine Drivinsky Hunsinger | Democratic | 1973–1976 | Detroit | Redistricted from the 16th district. |
| Michael J. Bennane | Democratic | 1977–1992 | Detroit | Redistricted to the 14th district. |
| William R. Bryant Jr. | Republican | 1993–1996 | Grosse Pointe Farms | Redistricted from the 13th district. |
| Andrew C. Richner | Republican | 1997–2002 | Grosse Pointe Park | Term limited. |
| Edward J. Gaffney | Republican | 2003–2008 | Grosse Pointe Farms | Term limited. |
| Timothy Bledsoe | Democratic | 2009–2012 | Grosse Pointe | |
| Brian Banks | Democratic | 2013–2017 | Detroit; Grosse Pointe (from around 2014 to 2016) | Resigned February 2017 as part of a plea agreement associated with felony charges. |
| Tenisha Yancey | Democratic | 2017 (Note: Elected in a 2017 special election to replace Rep. Brian Banks, who resigned.)–2022 | Detroit (until around 2018); Harper Woods | Term limited. |
| Tyrone Carter | Democratic | 2023–present | Detroit | Redistricted from the 6th district. |

== Historical district boundaries ==
| Map | Description | Apportionment Plan | Notes |
|---|---|---|---|
| | Wayne County (part): Grosse Pointe; Grosse Pointe Farms; Grosse Pointe Park (part); Grosse Pointe Township; Grosse Pointe Woods; Harper Woods | 1964 Apportionment Plan (Note: Referred to as the Austin-Kleiner plan.) | |
| | Wayne County (part): Detroit (part) | 1972 Apportionment Plan (Note: Referred to as the Hatcher-Kleiner plan.) | |
| | Wayne County (part): Detroit (part) | 1982 Apportionment Plan | |
| | Wayne County (part): Detroit (part; East English Village neighborhood); Grosse Pointe; Grosse Pointe Farms; Grosse Pointe Park; Grosse Pointe Township; Grosse Pointe Woods; Harper Woods | 1992 Apportionment Plan | |
| | Wayne County (part): Detroit (part; East English Village and Morningside neighborhoods); Grosse Pointe; Grosse Pointe Farms; Grosse Pointe Park; Grosse Pointe Township (incorporated into the City of Grosse Pointe Shores in 2009 (Note: This district included only part of Grosse Pointe Shores after 2009.)); Grosse Pointe Woods | 2001 Apportionment Plan | |
| | Wayne County (part): Detroit (part; Upper East Side); Grosse Pointe Shores (part); Grosse Pointe Woods; Harper Woods | 2011 Apportionment Plan | |
| | Wayne County (part): Detroit (part); River Rouge | 2021 Apportionment Plan (Note: Referred to as the Hickory plan.) | |
| | Wayne County (part): Detroit (part); Ecorse; River Rouge | Remedial 2021 Apportionment Plan Approved in 2024 (Note: Referred to as the Motown Sound FC E1 plan.) | |

== Recent elections ==
=== 2020s ===
2026 Michigan House of Representatives election
| Party | Candidate | Votes | % |
|---|---|---|---|
| Democratic | Tyrone Carter (incumbent) | 18,477 | 89.85 |
| Republican | Valerie Whittaker | 2,088 | 10.15 |
| Total votes | | 20,565 | 100 |
| Democratic hold | | | |

2024 Michigan House of Representatives election
| Party | Candidate | Votes | % |
|---|---|---|---|
| Democratic | Tyrone Carter (incumbent) | 18,744 | 81.64 |
| Republican | Valerie Whittaker | 4,216 | 18.36 |
| Total votes | | 22,960 | 100 |
| Democratic hold | | | |

2022 Michigan House of Representatives election
| Party | Candidate | Votes | % |
|---|---|---|---|
| Democratic | Tyrone Carter | 14,484 | 87.45 |
| Republican | Paula M. Campbell | 1,790 | 10.81 |
| Libertarian | Donnie Love | 288 | 1.74 |
| Total votes | | 16,562 | 100 |
| Democratic hold | | | |

2020 Michigan House of Representatives election
| Party | Candidate | Votes | % |
|---|---|---|---|
| Democratic | Tenisha R. Yancey (incumbent) | 29,742 | 75.83 |
| Republican | Latricia Ann Lanier | 8,696 | 22.17 |
| Libertarian | Gregory Creswell | 786 | 2 |
| Total votes | | 39,303 | 100 |
| Democratic hold | | | |

=== 2010s ===
2018 Michigan House of Representatives election
| Party | Candidate | Votes | % |
|---|---|---|---|
| Democratic | Tenisha R. Yancey (incumbent) | 21,790 | 72.91 |
| Republican | Mark Corcoran | 7,466 | 24.98 |
| Libertarian | Gregory Creswell | 631 | 2.11 |
| Total votes | | 29,877 | 100 |
| Democratic hold | | | |

2017 Michigan House of Representatives 1st district special election
| Party | Candidate | Votes | % |
|---|---|---|---|
| Democratic | Tenisha R. Yancey | 7,266 | 71.57 |
| Republican | William Broman | 2,551 | 25.13 |
| Libertarian | Gregory Creswell | 334 | 3.29 |
| Democratic Write-in | William Phillips | 1 | 0.01 |
| Total votes | | 10,152 | 100 |
| Democratic hold | | | |

2016 Michigan House of Representatives election
| Party | Candidate | Votes | % |
|---|---|---|---|
| Democratic | Brian R. Banks (incumbent) | 24,947 | 68.34 |
| Republican | William Broman | 11,558 | 31.66 |
| Total votes | | 36,505 | 100 |
| Democratic hold | | | |

2014 Michigan House of Representatives election
| Party | Candidate | Votes | % |
|---|---|---|---|
| Democratic | Brian R. Banks (incumbent) | 15,992 | 67.27 |
| Republican | John Hauler | 7,782 | 32.73 |
| Total votes | | 23,774 | 100 |
| Democratic hold | | | |

2012 Michigan House of Representatives election
| Party | Candidate | Votes | % |
|---|---|---|---|
| Democratic | Brian R. Banks | 27,843 | 70.79 |
| Republican | Dan Schulte | 11,489 | 29.21 |
| Total votes | | 39,332 | 100 |
| Democratic hold | | | |

2010 Michigan House of Representatives election
| Party | Candidate | Votes | % |
|---|---|---|---|
| Democratic | Timothy Bledsoe (incumbent) | 17,718 | 53.81 |
| Republican | Janice DuMouchelle | 15,210 | 46.19 |
| Total votes | | 32,928 | 100 |
| Democratic hold | | | |

=== 2000s ===
2008 Michigan House of Representatives election
| Party | Candidate | Votes | % |
|---|---|---|---|
| Democratic | Timothy Bledsoe | 26,811 | 56.78 |
| Republican | Mary Treder Lang | 20,405 | 43.22 |
| Total votes | | 47,216 | 100 |
| Democratic gain from Republican | | | |

2006 Michigan House of Representatives election
| Party | Candidate | Votes | % |
|---|---|---|---|
| Republican | Edward J. Gaffney (incumbent) | 19,500 | 52.06 |
| Democratic | Timothy Bledsoe | 17,308 | 46.2 |
| Green | Kristen Hamel | 652 | 1.74 |
| Total votes | | 37,460 | 100 |
| Republican hold | | | |

2004 Michigan House of Representatives election
| Party | Candidate | Votes | % |
|---|---|---|---|
| Republican | Edward J. Gaffney (incumbent) | 26,602 | 57.03 |
| Democratic | C. J. Harrison | 18,930 | 40.58 |
| Green | Andrea Lavigne | 1,116 | 2.39 |
| Total votes | | 46,648 | 100 |
| Republican hold | | | |

2002 Michigan House of Representatives election
| Party | Candidate | Votes | % |
|---|---|---|---|
| Republican | Edward J. Gaffney | 19,250 | 56.4 |
| Democratic | David Paul Putrycus | 14,880 | 43.6 |
| Total votes | | 34,130 | 100 |
| Republican hold | | | |

2000 Michigan House of Representatives election
| Party | Candidate | Votes | % |
|---|---|---|---|
| Republican | Andrew C. Richner (incumbent) | 25,228 | 61.61 |
| Democratic | Patricia Irving Cwiek | 14,811 | 36.17 |
| Libertarian | Craig B. Hodges | 906 | 2.21 |
| Total votes | | 40,945 | 100 |
| Republican hold | | | |

=== 1990s ===
1998 Michigan House of Representatives election
| Party | Candidate | Votes | % |
|---|---|---|---|
| Republican | Andrew C. Richner (incumbent) | 21,948 | 68.55 |
| Democratic | John Patrick Anderson | 10,068 | 31.45 |
| Total votes | | 32,016 | 100 |
| Republican hold | | | |
