= Michigan's 30th House of Representatives district =

American legislative district

Michigan's 30th State House of Representatives district
Representative
William Bruck; R–Erie
- Demographics: 88.7% White; 1.9% Black; 4.1% Hispanic; 0.5% Asian; 0.4% Other; 4.4% Multiracial
- Population (2024): 94,024

Michigan's 30th House of Representatives district is a legislative district within the Michigan House of Representatives located in the counties of Lenawee and Monroe. The district was created in 1965, when the Michigan Supreme Court ordered the reapportionment of state legislative districts from a county-based system to a proportional one following the Supreme Court case Reynolds v. Sims. It is currently represented by Republican William Bruck of Erie.

== List of representatives ==
Representative	Party	Years	Residence	Notes
Joyce Symons	Democratic	1965–1982	Allen Park	
Jeffrey D. Padden	Democratic	1983–1984	Wyandotte	Redistricted from the 27th district.
Joseph Palamara	Democratic	1985–1992	Wyandotte	Redistricted to the 24th district.
Sal Rocca	Republican	1993–1994	Sterling Heights	Redistricted from the 71st district.
Sue Rocca	Republican	1995–2000	Sterling Heights	Term limited.
Sal Rocca	Republican	2001–2004	Sterling Heights	Term limited.
Tory Rocca	Republican	2005–2010	Sterling Heights	Term limited.
Jeff Farrington	Republican	2011–2016	Utica	Term limited.
Diana Farrington	Republican	2017–2022	Utica	Term limited.
William Bruck	Republican	2023–present	Erie	

== Historical district boundaries ==
Map	Description	Apportionment Plan	Notes
	Wayne County (part): Allen Park; Dearborn (part); Lincoln Park (part); Melvindale	1964 Apportionment Plan (Note: Referred to as the Austin-Kleiner plan.)	
	Wayne County (part): Allen Park; Dearborn (part); Lincoln Park (part); Melvindale	1972 Apportionment Plan (Note: Referred to as the Hatcher-Kleiner plan.)	
	Wayne County (part): Allen Park (part); Southgate; Wyandotte	1982 Apportionment Plan	
	Macomb County (part): Sterling Heights (part)	1992 Apportionment Plan	
	Macomb County (part): Sterling Heights (part); Utica	2001 Apportionment Plan	
	Macomb County (part): Shelby Charter Township (part); Sterling Heights (part); Utica	2011 Apportionment Plan	
	Lenawee County (part): Blissfield Township (part); Deerfield Township; Ridgeway Township; Monroe County (part): Bedford Township; Erie Township; Frenchtown Township (part); Ida Township; La Salle Township; Luna Pier; Monroe (part); Monroe Township; Petersburg; Summerfield Township; Whiteford Township	2021 Apportionment Plan	

== Recent elections ==
=== 2020s ===
2026 Michigan House of Representatives election
Party	Candidate	Votes	%
Republican	William Bruck (incumbent)	25,743	60.52
Democratic	Omar G. Ferdin	16,793	39.48
Total votes		42,536	100
Republican hold			

2024 Michigan House of Representatives election
Party	Candidate	Votes	%
Republican	William Bruck (incumbent)	33,278	64.54
Democratic	Rick Kull	18,282	35.46
Total votes		51,560	100
Republican hold			

2022 Michigan House of Representatives election
Party	Candidate	Votes	%
Republican	William Bruck	25,163	63.27
Democratic	Suzanne Jennens	14,606	36.73
Total votes		39,769	100
Republican hold			

2020 Michigan House of Representatives election
Party	Candidate	Votes	%
Republican	Diana Farrington (incumbent)	28,199	62.37
Democratic	Michael A. Chehab	17,016	37.63
Total votes		45,215	100
Republican hold			

=== 2010s ===
2018 Michigan House of Representatives election
Party	Candidate	Votes	%
Republican	Diana Farrington (incumbent)	17,511	56.86
Democratic	John P. Spica	13,284	43.14
Total votes		30,795	100
Republican hold			

2016 Michigan House of Representatives election
Party	Candidate	Votes	%
Republican	Diana Farrington	19,863	53.85
Democratic	Michael R. Notte	17,026	46.15
Total votes		36,889	100
Republican hold			

2014 Michigan House of Representatives election
Party	Candidate	Votes	%
Republican	Jeff Farrington (incumbent)	12,654	54.76
Democratic	Bo Karpinsky	10,455	45.24
Total votes		23,109	100
Republican hold			

2012 Michigan House of Representatives election
Party	Candidate	Votes	%
Republican	Jeff Farrington (incumbent)	18,160	53.25
Democratic	Joseph Bogdan	15,943	46.75
Total votes		34,103	100
Republican hold			

2010 Michigan House of Representatives election
Party	Candidate	Votes	%
Republican	Jeff Farrington	15,732	55.72
Democratic	Ken Lampar	12,502	44.28
Total votes		28,234	100
Republican hold			

=== 2000s ===
2008 Michigan House of Representatives election
Party	Candidate	Votes	%
Republican	Tory Rocca (incumbent)	25,713	59.99
Democratic	Grant E. Hughes	17,150	40.01
Total votes		42,863	100
Republican hold			

2006 Michigan House of Representatives election
Party	Candidate	Votes	%
Republican	Tory Rocca (incumbent)	19,387	59.74
Democratic	Rose Marie Fessler	13,066	40.26
Total votes		32,453	100
Republican hold			

2004 Michigan House of Representatives election
Party	Candidate	Votes	%
Republican	Tory Rocca	22,725	53.85
Democratic	Roger M. Maceroni	19,474	46.15
Write-In	Stephen Tash	2	0
Total votes		42,201	100
Republican hold			

2002 Michigan House of Representatives election
Party	Candidate	Votes	%
Republican	Sal Rocca (incumbent)	17,243	62.4
Democratic	Joe McHugh	10,392	37.6
Total votes		27,635	100
Republican hold			

2000 Michigan House of Representatives election
Party	Candidate	Votes	%
Republican	Sal Rocca	23,625	61.07
Democratic	Irvin Droste	15,059	38.93
Total votes		38,684	100
Republican hold			

=== 1990s ===
1998 Michigan House of Representatives election
Party	Candidate	Votes	%
Republican	Sue Rocca (incumbent)	19,480	70.27
Democratic	Roger A. Fachini	7,287	26.29
Libertarian	Gerald J. McKeon	562	2.03
Reform	Robert Murphy	391	1.41
Total votes		27,720	100
Republican hold			
