= William Bruck =

American politician from Michigan

Member of the Michigan House of Representatives from the 30th district
- Incumbent
- Assumed office January 1, 2023
- Preceded by: Diana Farrington (redistricting)

Personal details
- Born: 1975 (age 50–51) Michigan
- Party: Republican
- Education: Northland Baptist Bible College; Columbia Southern University

William Bruck (born 1975) is an American politician serving as a member of the Michigan House of Representatives since 2023, representing the 30th district. A member of the Republican Party, Bruck was reelected in 2024.

Bruck is an Army reserve veteran and a franchise owner. He became a Chief Warrant Officer 4 as a military engineer. He served in the 983rd Engineer Battalion, a reserve unit in Monclova, Ohio.

== See also ==
- Official website
- Campaign website
