= Sue Rocca =

American politician from Michigan

Member of the Michigan House of Representatives from the 30th district
- In office January 1, 1995 – December 2000
- Succeeded by: Sal Rocca

Personal details
- Born: Sue Marshall; May 12, 1949 (age 77) Delaware, Ohio, U.S.
- Party: Republican
- Spouse: Sal Rocca
- Children: 2
- Occupation: Nurse, politician

Sue Rocca (born 1949) is an American politician and former nurse from Michigan. Rocca was a Republican member of the Michigan House of Representatives and a member of the Macomb County Commission.

== Early life ==
On May 12, 1949, Rocca was born as Sue Marshall in Delaware, Ohio. Rocca's father was Ralph Marshall. Rocca's mother was Sadie Marshall. Rocca graduated from Rutherford B. Hayes High School in Delaware, Ohio.

== Education ==
Rocca attended Bowling Green State University in Bowling Green, Ohio. Rocca earned an Associate of Science degree in nursing from North Central Michigan College.

== Career ==
Rocca was a registered nurse. Rocca was a head nurse in the psychiatric ward of Lockwood MacDonald Hospital in Petoskey, Michigan. Rocca was also a nurse at William Beaumont Hospital in Troy, Michigan.

In 1986, Rocca's political career began when she was appointed a member of the Michigan Health Occupations Council by Governor James Blanchard. Rocca served on this council until 1994.

In 1992 Rocca was elected a member of the Macomb County Commission.

On November 8, 1994, at age 45, Rocca won the election and became a Republican member of Michigan House of Representatives for District 30. On November 5, 1996 as an incumbent, Rocca won re-election and continued serving District 30. On November 3, 1998, as an incumbent, Rocca won the election and continued serving District 30. Rocca served until 2000. Rocca introduced several bills to focus anti-drug efforts. One of these criminalized the use of Ketamine. In November 2000, Rocca did not run for District 30 due to term-limits. During her time in the statehouse she served on the Constitutional Law and Ethics, Health Policy, Regulatory Reform, Senior Health, Security and Retirement committees In May 2001, after David Jaye was expelled from Michigan Senate, a special Republican primary election was held. On September 11, 2001, Rocca ran for a seat in Michigan Senate for District 12 unsuccessfully. Rocca was defeated by Alan Sanborn.

In May 2010, Rocca did not seek a seat as a commissioner in Macomb County Commission. Rocca retired at the end of her term.

== Personal life ==
Rocca's husband was Sal Rocca, an Italian-born American politician in Michigan. Rocca has 2 children, Tory Rocca (step-son) and Michael Rocca. Rocca and her family live in Sterling Heights, Michigan. On December 30, 2020, Sal died of COVID-19 during the COVID-19 pandemic in Michigan. She wanted it to be known to the public Sal's cause of death, as to emphasize the seriousness of the pandemic to them.
