= Tyrone Carter (politician) =

American politician (born 1962)

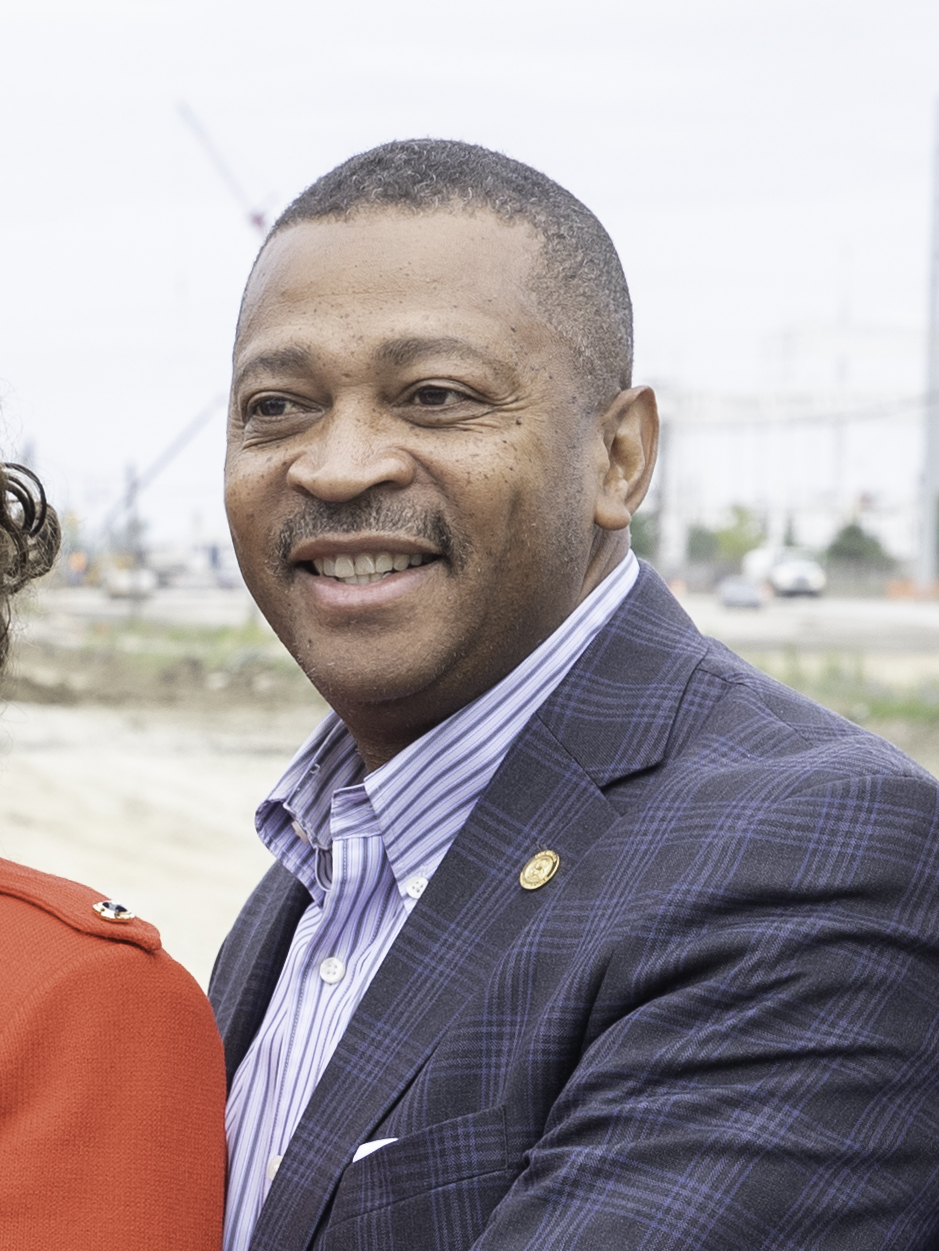

Member of the Michigan House of Representatives
- Incumbent
- Assumed office January 1, 2019
- Preceded by: Stephanie Chang
- Constituency: 6th district (2019-2022); 1st district (2023-present)

Personal details
- Born: May 24, 1962 (age 64)
- Party: Democratic
- Spouse: Lisa Carter
- Education: Henry Ford Community College (AA); Central Michigan University (BA); FBI National Academy

Tyrone A. Carter (born May 24, 1962) is an American law enforcement officer and politician serving as a member of the Michigan House of Representatives since 2019, currently representing the 1st district. He is a member of the Democratic Party.

== Education ==
Carter graduated from Wayne County Sheriff's Police Academy.

== Career ==
After 25 years, and achieving the rank of Executive Lieutenant, Carter retired from Wayne County Sheriff's Office in 2008. On November 6, 2018, Carter won the election and became a member of Michigan House of Representatives for District 6. Carter currently serves as a member of the Michigan Legislative Black Caucus. Following the 2020 redistricting cycle, Carter successfully ran for reelection in the state House's 1st district in 2022. He was again reelected in 2024.

== Personal life ==
Carter's wife Lisa serves as the District 6 Police Commissioner. On March 26, 2020, Carter tested positive for COVID-19.

Political offices
Preceded by Stephanie Chang	Michigan Representatives; 6th District; 2019–2022	Succeeded by Regina Weiss
Preceded by Tenisha Yancey	Michigan Representatives; 1st District; 2023–present	Succeeded by Incumbent
