= Tenisha Yancey =

American politician (born 1976)

Tenisha Renee Yancey
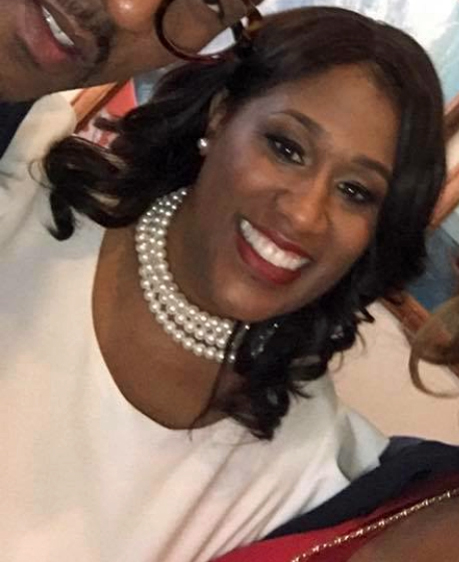

Member of the Michigan House of Representatives from the 1st district
- In office November 17, 2017 – December 31, 2022
- Preceded by: Brian Banks
- Succeeded by: Tyrone Carter

Personal details
- Born: August 29, 1976 (age 50) Detroit, Michigan, U.S.
- Party: Democratic
- Children: Jaylen
- Education: Eastern Michigan University (B.AS.), University of Detroit Mercy School of Law (J.D.)
- Occupation: Attorney

Tenisha Renee Yancey (born August 29, 1976) formerly served as a Democratic member of the Michigan House of Representatives, where she represented the 1st House District.

Yancey was elected in the 2017 Special Election called to fill a vacancy created when former representative Brian Banks resigned after being charged with fraud.

== Personal life ==
Yancey is the niece of former United Auto Workers Vice President, Jimmy Settles.

Yancey worked for the Wayne County Executive's office and the Wayne County Land Bank prior to receiving her Juris Doctor degree in 2012. After passing the Michigan Bar in May 2014, Yancey joined the Wayne County Prosecutor's office; where she worked until her employment ended in April 2017.

=== Legal issues ===
In 1995, when Yancey was a teenager, she was found guilty of retail fraud and pleaded guilty to stalking. She served two years' probation for the stalking incident. Two years later, in 1997, she was sentenced to one year's probation for not stopping at the scene of a property damage accident.

== Political career ==
=== 2016 General Election ===
Tenisha Yancey was elected to the Harper Woods School Board on November 8, 2016. Yancey had no children attending school in the Harper Woods School District, but cited her experience in the court system as making her qualified to serve on the Board.

=== 2017 Special Primary Election ===
After the resignation of Brian Banks due to pending legal issues, Yancey ran in the 2017 special primary election to replace him in Michigan's 1st House District. A friend of Bank's, he volunteered in her campaign. She earned 33 percent of the vote in the primaries against attorney Pamela Sossi. In the primary and election, she was supported by then mayor Mike Duggan. During the election, her previous convictions were brought up by her opposition.

=== 2017 Special General Election ===
In the November 8, 2017, Special Election General, Yancey received 7,266 votes, or 71% of the vote.

=== 2022 Primary Election ===
On April 19, 2022, Yancey filed to run for Judge of the 3rd Circuit Court. On April 19, 2022, Yancey also filed to run for Judge of the 36th District Court. On April 22, 2022, Yancey abandoned her candidacy for Judge of the 3rd Circuit Court.

== Electoral history ==
Michigan House of Representatives 1st District Special Democratic Primary(Wayne County (part))
Party	Candidate	Votes	%
Democratic	Tenisha Yancey	2,215	33.01
Democratic	Pamela Sossi	2,017	30.06
Democratic	Sandra Bucciero	956	14.25
Democratic	Justin Johnson	615	9.17
Democratic	Washington Youson	415	6.18
Democratic	Keith Hollowell	150	2.24
Democratic	Kirkland Garey	107	1.59
Democratic	Burgess Foster	78	1.16
Democratic	John Donahue	76	1.13
Democratic	Gowana Mancill Jr.	45	0.67
Democratic	Ronald Diebel	36	0.54

Michigan House of Representatives 1st District Special Election(Wayne County (part))
Party	Candidate	Votes	%
Democratic	Tenisha Yancey	7,266	71.3
Republican	Mark Corcoran	2,551	25.0
Libertarian	Greg Creswell	334	3.3
Democratic hold			

== See also ==
- Michigan House of Representatives
- Michigan Democratic Party
