= Sal Rocca =

American politician from Michigan (1946–2020)

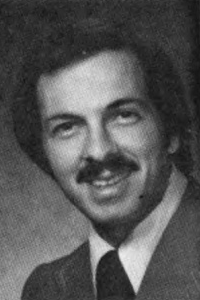

Member of the Michigan House of Representatives from the 30th district
- In office January 1, 2001 – December 31, 2004
- Preceded by: Sue Rocca
- Succeeded by: Tory Rocca
- In office January 1, 1993 – December 31, 1994
- Preceded by: Joseph Palamara
- Succeeded by: Sue Rocca

Member of the Michigan House of Representatives from the 71st district
- In office January 1, 1983 – December 31, 1992
- Preceded by: Doug Cruce
- Succeeded by: Frank M. Fitzgerald
- In office January 1, 1975 – December 31, 1980
- Preceded by: Thomas Guastello
- Succeeded by: Doug Cruce

Member of the Macomb County Board of Commissioners
- In office January 1, 1995 – December 31, 2000

Personal details
- Born: October 29, 1946 Casalvieri, Lazio, Italy
- Died: December 13, 2020 (aged 74) Troy, Michigan, U.S.
- Party: Republican (1992–2020); Democratic (before 1992)
- Children: 2
- Relatives: Tory Rocca (son)

Sal Rocca (October 29, 1946 – December 13, 2020) was an American politician who served as a member of the Michigan House of Representatives for several years, as well as serving a few terms as a member of the Macomb County Board of Commissioners. He made an unsuccessful run for the Republican nomination for the Michigan Senate district in Sterling Heights and areas north, losing to Dave Jaye in the 1998 primary. Rocca's son Tory Rocca later represented the district previously represented by his father.

== Early life ==
Rocca was born in Casalvieri, Lazio, Italy, to Virginia and Ororio Rocca. When Rocca was six, his family moved to Windsor, Ontario, Canada. At age 13, he immigrated with his family to the United States, settling in Detroit, Michigan. Rocca graduated from Detroit's Southwestern High School and has taken courses at Macomb Community College. Rocca was a Catholic and a member of St. Blase Catholic Church in Sterling Heights.

== Career ==
Rocca was first elected to the Michigan House of Representatives in 1974 as a Democrat. He served through 1980. In 1982, he was again elected to the State House serving through the end of 1994. In 1992, he switched parties to become a Republican. From 1995 to 2001, Rocca served as a member of the Macomb County Board of Commissioners. During this time his wife Sue filled the state house seat he had previously held. In 1998, he ran for the Republican nomination for the state senate seat vacated by the death of Doug Carl but lost to Dave Jaye in the primary.

He was again elected to the State House in 2000 and served through the end of 2004.

Rocca previously worked for General Motors and was a licensed real estate broker. During his last term in the Michigan House Rocca had the most time as a member of the house of any member, since unlike most of his other fellow house members in 1992 he had not used up all his post-1992 six years allowed by the term limit laws.

== Death ==
Rocca died from COVID-19 in Troy, Michigan, on December 13, 2020, during the COVID-19 pandemic in Michigan. He was 74.
