= Andrew Richner =

American politician from Michigan

Andrew C. Richner

193rd Regent of the University of Michigan
- In office January 1, 2003 – January 1, 2019
- Preceded by: Daniel D. Horning
- Succeeded by: Paul Brown

Member of the Michigan House of Representatives from the 1st district
- In office January 1, 1997 – December 31, 2002
- Preceded by: William R. Bryant Jr.
- Succeeded by: Edward Gaffney

Member of the Wayne County Commission
- In office 1993–1996

Personal details
- Born: July 4, 1961 (age 65) Detroit, Michigan
- Party: Republican
- Spouse: Susan
- Children: 2
- Education: University of Michigan (BBA, JD)
- Occupation: Partner, Clark Hill PLC
- Profession: Attorney

Andrew C. Richner is an attorney and Republican politician who served as a member of the Board of Regents of the University of Michigan and the Michigan House of Representatives.

== Early life ==
Richner was born in Detroit on July 4, 1961 and attended school in Grosse Pointe. He earned both his bachelor's and law degrees from the University of Michigan. Richner was an intern in the Office of the White House Counsel under President Ronald Reagan. His first experience in elected office was as a member of the Grosse Pointe Park City Council, and later as a member of the Wayne County Commission.

== Political career ==
=== State House ===
Richner won election to the Michigan House of Representatives in 1996 and served three terms. During that time, he was a member of the Michigan Commission on Uniform State Laws and the Securities Act drafting committee of the National Conference of Commissioners on Uniform State Laws.

=== University of Michigan Board of Regents ===
Richner was elected to the Board of Regents of the University of Michigan in 2002, and re-elected in 2010. He served two stints chairing the board.

== Personal life ==
Richner is a member of the Clark Hill law firm in Detroit, working in its government and public affairs practice group.

Richner was a delegate to the 2004 Republican National Convention which nominated George W. Bush for a second term as President of the United States.
