= Michael J. Bennane =

American politician (1945–2018)

Member of the Michigan House of Representatives
- In office January 1, 1977 – December 31, 1996
- Preceded by: Josephine Hunsinger
- Succeeded by: Derrick Hale
- Constituency: 1st district (1977–1992); 14th district (1993–1996)

Personal details
- Born: January 27, 1945 Detroit
- Died: September 30, 2018 (aged 73)
- Party: Democratic
- Education: Wayne State University Law School (J.D.); Wayne State University (B.A.)

Michael J. Bennane (January 27, 1945 – September 30, 2018) was a Democratic member of the Michigan House of Representatives, representing a portion of Detroit between 1977 and 1996.

A native of Detroit, Bennane played football at Benedictine High School and was an all-city and all-state athlete in his senior year. Bennane earned his bachelor's degree from Wayne State University. After graduation, he taught and coached baseball, basketball, and football, winning a division title and being named coach of the year in 1969 by The Detroit News for football. Bennane also worked in insurance before winning election to the state House in 1976.

He chaired the Urban Development Committee in the 1980s, co-chaired the Public Health Committee in 1993–94, and was elected Associate Speaker pro tempore from 1985 through 1988. Bennane attended Wayne State University Law School and earned his J.D. while in the House.

After leaving the House, Bennane became an administrative law judge.

Bennane died on September 30, 2018, aged 73.
