= Brian Banks (politician) =

American politician (born 1976)

Brian Roderick Banks
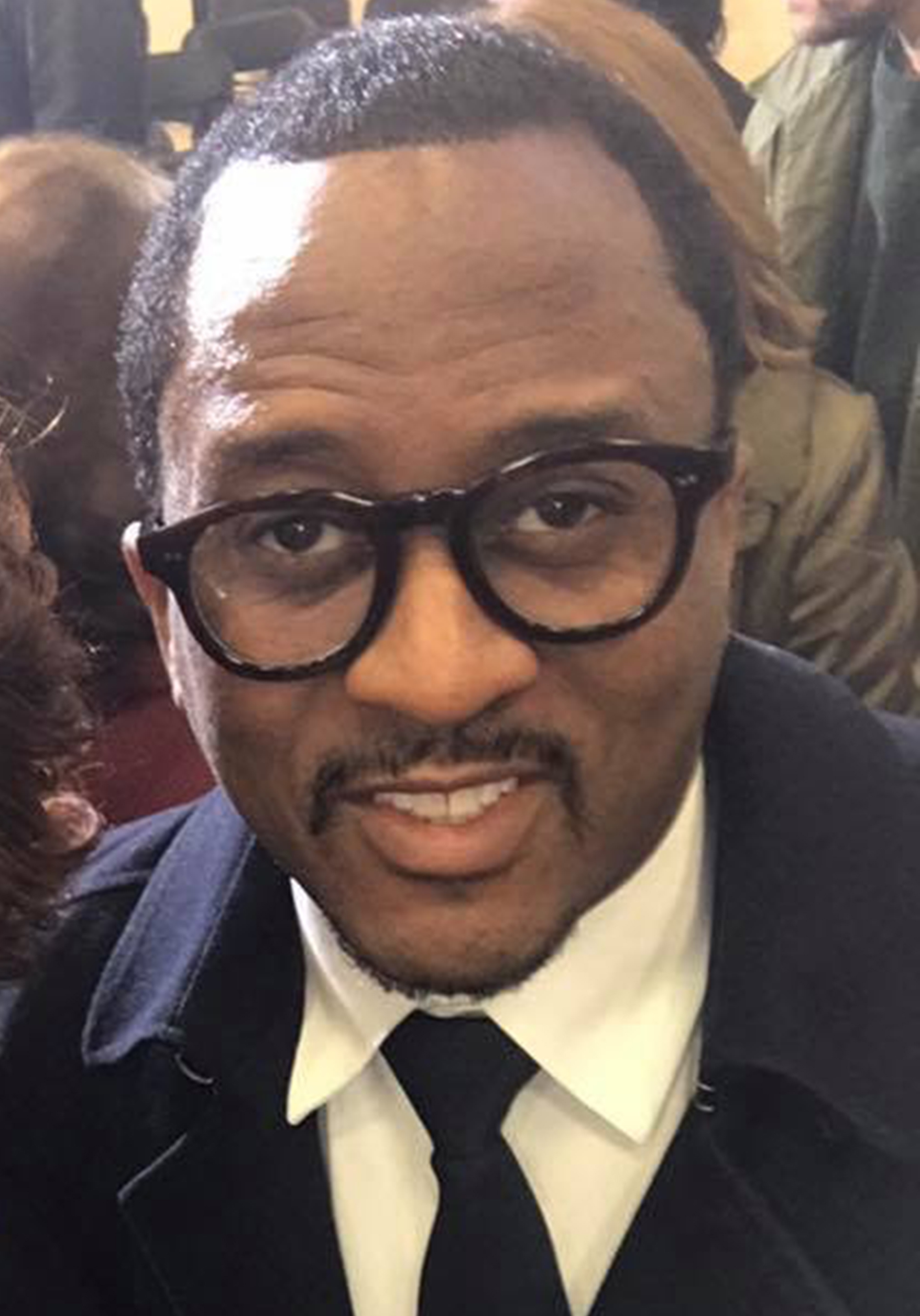

Member of the Michigan House of Representatives from the 1st district
- In office January 1, 2013 – February 6, 2017
- Preceded by: Tim Bledsoe
- Succeeded by: Tenisha Yancey

Personal details
- Born: November 15, 1976 (age 49) Detroit, Michigan, U.S.
- Party: Democratic
- Education: Wayne State University (BS, MEd); Michigan State University (JD)
- Website: Official

Brian Roderick Banks (born November 15, 1976) is an American politician who served as a member of the Michigan House of Representatives from 2013 to 2017. Banks was a candidate for the 2nd District of the Michigan Senate in 2018. He has been convicted of eight felonies related to writing bad checks and credit card fraud.

== Education ==
Banks dropped out of high school as a teenager, but later earned a Certificate of High School Equivalency by passing the GED exam. He went on to receive a Bachelor of Science degree and a Master of Education degree from Wayne State University, followed by a Juris Doctor from the Michigan State University College of Law.

== Career ==
=== Early career ===
Banks's campaign website previously stated that he was on staff at the law firm Rodnick, Unger and Kaner, P.C. and was an adjunct professor at Baker College. An employee at Rodnick, Unger and Kaner, P.C. told the Huffington Post that while Banks briefly worked at the firm as a law clerk, he left after only a few months.

=== Michigan House of Representatives ===
Banks defeated Scott Benson by 96 votes to win the 2012 Democratic primary for the 1st district of the Michigan House of Representatives. During the 2012 general election, the Grosse Pointe Democrats refused to endorse Banks. He won again in the 2014 primary, receiving 42% of the vote. During the August 2016 primary election, which he won, Banks ran against attorney Pamela Sossi.

As the chair of the Detroit Caucus, Banks was able to enlist the help of Detroit Mayor Mike Duggan, other lawmakers and interest groups in Lansing to raise $140,545, second most of all candidates facing Primary challengers.

During the November 8 general election, Banks received 66 percent of the vote over engineer William Broman, his Republican challenger.

==== Resignation ====
On February 6, 2017, Bank plead guilty to the misdemeanor charge of filing a false statement about financial conditions. As part of the plea deal, the felony charges against him were dropped and he resigned from office. On February 16, 2017, Governor Rick Snyder called a special election to fill his seat.

=== 2018 Michigan Senate election ===
In August 2017, Banks filed candidate paperwork to run for the Michigan State Senate 2nd District seat in anticipation of a resignation by Bert Johnson, who has been federally indicted for corruption. In the election, which took place in August 2018, Banks lost to first-time candidates Adam Hollier and Abraham Aiyash.

=== 2022 Wayne County Commission election ===
In 2022 Banks ran in the August Democratic primary to represent District 1 on the Wayne County Commission, listing his address as a post office box in Grosse Pointe. Incumbent Commissioner Tim Killeen defeated Banks in the primary election by 61.6% to 38.1%.

=== Business ===
In 2019 Banks was hired to recruit students for Promise Schools, a company running a K-8 school for the School District of the City of Highland Park.

== Legal issues ==
Between 1998 and 2004, Banks was convicted eight times for felonies in which he wrote dishonored checks and committed credit card fraud. In 2013, a former aid sued Banks for sexual harassment. Banks settled the lawsuit for $11,950.

=== 2016 fraud case ===
On June 28, 2016, Banks was charged with three felonies and one misdemeanor by Michigan Attorney General Bill Schuette over documents he falsified to obtain a personal loan in June 2010. He was formally arraigned in Circuit Court on August 23. Banks filed a suit to have the prosecutor's office removed from the case, his lawyer claiming that the charges were "politically motivated" in nature. His suit was dropped. On February 6, 2017, Banks pleaded guilty to a misdemeanor charge of filing false financial statements and resigned from office as part of a plea deal to avoid felony charges. He was sentenced to time served. Banks announced his formal resignation in Wayne County Circuit Court on February 6, 2017.

== Electoral history ==
2012 Michigan 1st House District Primary Election
Party	Candidate	Votes	%
Democratic	Brian Banks	2,304	30
Democratic	Scott Benson	2,208	29
Democratic	Christopher Cavanagh	1,275	17
Democratic	Valerie Kindle	1,235	16
Democratic	Gregory Robinson	450	6

2012 Michigan 1st House District General Election
Party	Candidate	Votes	%
Democratic	Brian Banks	27,843	70
Republican	Dan Schulte	11,489	29

2014 Michigan 1st House District Primary Election
Party	Candidate	Votes	%
Democratic	Brian Banks	3,140	42
Democratic	Rebecca Thompson	2,645	36
Democratic	Michael Koester	813	11
Democratic	Taryn Jones	296	4
Democratic	Harry Scott	159	2
Democratic	Paul Fillmore	152	2
Democratic	Corey Gilchrist	123	1

2014 Michigan 1st House District General Election
Party	Candidate	Votes	%
Democratic	Brian Banks	15,992	67.27
Republican	John Hauler	7,782	32.73

2016 Michigan 1st House District Primary Election
Party	Candidate	Votes	%
Democratic	Brian Banks	3,293	44
Democratic	Pamela Sossi	2,618	36
Democratic	Washington Youson	573	7
Democratic	Keith Hollowell	507	5
Democratic	Corey Gilchrist	218	2
Democratic	Kameshea Amos	211	2

2016 Michigan 1st House District General Election
Party	Candidate	Votes	%
Democratic	Brian Banks	24,947	68
Republican	William Broman	11,558	31

2018 Michigan 2nd Senate District Primary Election
Party	Candidate	Votes	%
Democratic	Adam Hollier	6,927	25
Democratic	Abraham Aiyash	5,764	21
Democratic	Brian Banks	4,719	17
Democratic	Regina Williams	2,592	9
Democratic	LaMar Lemmons III	2,505	9
Democratic	John Olumba	1,730	6
Democratic	George Cushingberry	1,116	4
Democratic	Anam Miah	931	3
Democratic	Lawrence Gannan	555	2
Democratic	William Phillips	328	1
Democratic	Tommy Campbell	264	0

2022 Wayne County Commission District 1 Primary Election
Party	Candidate	Votes	%
Democratic	Tim Killeen	9,312	62
Democratic	Brian Banks	5,765	38

== See also ==
- Michigan House of Representatives
- Michigan Democratic Party
