= Jeff Farrington =

American businessman and politician from Michigan

Member of the Michigan House of Representatives from the 30th district
- In office January 1, 2011 – December 31, 2016
- Preceded by: Tory Rocca
- Succeeded by: Diana Farrington

Personal details
- Party: Republican
- Spouse: Diana Farrington
- Children: 2
- Education: Walsh College
- Occupation: Businessman, politician

Jeff Farrington is a former American politician. Farrington is former a Republican member of the Michigan House of Representatives. Farrington is the COO at Gordon Advisors.

== Early life ==
Farrington's parents are Tom and Marie Farrington. Farrington grew up in Utica, Michigan. In 1983, Farrington graduated from Utica High School.

== Education ==
Farrington attended Macomb Community College. In 1988, Farrington earned a bachelor's degree in Business Administration from Walsh College. In 1993, Farrington earned a master's degree in Management from Walsh College.

== Career ==
In 1993, Farrington was the Vice President of Kforce, a staffing company, until 2004. In 2004, Farrington co-founded and became President of Dynamic Recruiters, Inc until 2011.

In November 2010, Farrington was elected as a member of Michigan House of Representatives in Michigan's 30th House of Representatives district.

In 2012 he was reelected from a new district which included more of Sterling Heights than had his old district.

Since 2012, Farrington is the President of Echo Consultants LLC.

In 2016, due to term limits, Farrington will not be able to run for another term.

In 2017, Farrington became the COO for Gordon Advisors, a CPA and consulting firm.

== Awards ==
- 2012 Legislator of the year. Present by Michigan Manufacturers Association.
- 2014 Legislator of the Year. Presented by Fraternal Order of Police.

== Personal life ==
Farrington's wife is Diana Farrington, a politician in Michigan. They have two children, Mitch and Nick.

== See also ==
- 2010 Michigan House of Representatives election
- 2012 Michigan House of Representatives election
- 2014 Michigan House of Representatives election
