= Diana Farrington =

American politician in Michigan

Member of the Michigan House of Representatives from the 30th district
- In office January 1, 2017 – January 1, 2023
- Preceded by: Jeff Farrington
- Succeeded by: William Bruck

Personal details
- Born: March 9, 1965 (age 61) Sterling Heights, Michigan, U.S.
- Party: Republican
- Spouse: Jeff Farrington
- Children: 2

Diana Farrington (born March 9, 1965) is an American politician who served as a member of the Michigan House of Representatives from the 30th district from 2017 to 2023.

== Early life ==
Farrington was born in Sterling Heights, Michigan. Farrington grew up in Utica, Michigan. Farrington graduated from Utica High School.

== Education ==
Farrington attended Oakland University.

== Career ==
Farrington is a mortgage auditor. Farrington owns a sports photography company.

In November 2016, Farrington was elected to the Michigan House of Representatives for District 30. Farrington is the chairperson of the Financial Services Committee.

== Personal life ==
Farrington's husband is Jeff Farrington, a former politician in Michigan. They have two children.

== See also ==
- 2018 Michigan House of Representatives election
- 2020 Michigan House of Representatives election
