= Edward Gaffney =

American politician from Michigan

Edward J. Gaffney

Member of the Michigan House of Representatives from the 1st district
- In office January 1, 2003 – December 31, 2008
- Preceded by: Andrew Richner
- Succeeded by: Tim Bledsoe

Personal details
- Born: December 23, 1943 (age 82) Hartford, Connecticut
- Party: Republican
- Spouse: Jane Gaffney

Edward J. Gaffney (born December 23, 1943, in Hartford, Connecticut) was a Republican Michigan State Representative from Grosse Pointe Farms. He served in the state House between 2003 and 2008, and represented the Michigan's 1st state House district. Gaffney was the last Republican in the state house or senate to represent a district in Detroit.

== Early life and career ==
He was the oldest of six children. His father was a vocational agriculture teacher and school administrator. His mother was primarily a homemaker. But Ed always said: "My mother was the brains of the outfit". He spent his formative years of junior high school and high school in Danielson, Connecticut, graduating from Killingly High School in 1962. After a lackluster high school academic record, he studied barbering at Prince Technical School in Hartford and worked his way through college as a barber in Putnam, Connecticut. Having found himself at Eastern Connecticut State University, Gaffney received honor for his study of history. He went on to become a graduate assistant in department of history at Michigan State University and earned a Master of Arts degree in history at MSU in 1970. He worked at the Michigan Legislative Service Bureau from 1970 to 1977. In 1977, he secured a governmental affairs position with the Motor Vehicle Manufacturers Association where he remained until 1998.

He worked for the Michigan Trucking Association from 1998 to 2002. He won election to the state legislature in 1998. Gaffney served on many committees including Health Policy Committee, where served for Chair for two years. He began his political career on the Grosse Pointe Farms, Michigan city council, serving there for eleven years. He was Mayor of Grosse Pointe Farms for two years.

Upon completion of six years in Michigan House of Representatives, Mr. Gaffney served eight years on the Michigan Liquor Control Commission from which he retired in 2017.

Gaffney holds a bachelor's degree from Eastern Connecticut State University, a master’s of history from Michigan State University, a Juris Doctor degree from Thomas Cooley Law School and a master’s of law degree from Wayne State University

From 1991 to 2002, Gaffney was a member of St. Michael’s Episcopal Church of Grosse Pointe Woods.

Gaffney was a Director of the Michigan Center for Truck Safety. He has also served as a regional government affairs director for the American Automobile Manufacturers Association and as a legal counsel and research analyst for the Michigan Legislative Services Bureau.

=== Family ===
Rep. Gaffney is married to Jane Gaffney and has three children: Ed, Corey and Jack.

=== Political career ===
From 1997 to 1999, Gaffney served on the City Council for the City of Grosse Pointe Farms, and was mayor pro-tem from 1997 to 1999. Gaffney was mayor of Grosse Pointe Farms from 1999 to 2003. He was elected to the Michigan State House of Representatives in 2002, and re-elected in 2004 and 2006. Under the term limits provisions of Michigan's Constitution, Gaffney is barred from seeking re-election in 2008. Gaffney was the last Republican in the state house or senate to represent a district in Detroit.

== Electoral history ==
- 2006 election for Michigan State House of Representatives - Michigan 1st District

Name	Percent
Edward J. Gaffney (R) (inc.)	52.1%
Timothy Bledsoe (D)	46.2%
Kristen Hammel (G)	1.7%

- 2004 election for Michigan State House of Representatives - Michigan 1st District

Name	Percent
Edward J. Gaffney (R) (inc.)	57.0%
C.J. Harrison (D)	40.6%
Andrea Lavigne (G)	2.4%

- 2002 election for Michigan State House of Representatives - Michigan 1st District

Name	Percent
Edward J. Gaffney (R)	56.4%
David P. Putrycus (D)	43.6%%

- 2002 election for Michigan State House of Representatives - Michigan 1st District (Republican primary)

Name	Percent
Edward J. Gaffney	48.3%
Mary Ellen Stempfle	40.8%%
Eric J. Steiner	10.9%

Preceded by Andrew Richner	Michigan's 1st House of Representatives district 2002 – Present	Succeeded by Incumbent
