= William R. Bryant Jr. =

American politician from Michigan

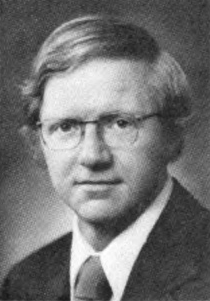

Member of the Michigan House of Representatives
- In office January 1, 1971 – December 31, 1996
- Preceded by: Robert E. Waldron
- Succeeded by: Andrew Richner
- Constituency: 1st district (1971–1972); 13th district (1973–1992); 1st district (1993–1996)

Personal details
- Born: William Robert Bryant Jr. May 4, 1938 Detroit
- Died: May 20, 2020 (aged 82) Kiawah Island, South Carolina
- Party: Republican
- Spouse: Lois
- Education: Princeton University (A.B.); University of Michigan (L.L.B.)

William R. Bryant Jr. (May 4, 1938 – May 20, 2020) was a Republican former member of the Michigan House of Representatives and of the Wayne County Commission.

== Biography ==
During his time in the House, Bryant was Republican floor leader from 1975 through 1978, then minority leader through 1982. He retired one term before Michigan's then-new term limits would have forced him from office.

Bryant died May 20, 2020, aged 82, from Parkinson's disease. He was able to be right next to his family, including his wife, Lois.
