= East English Village =

- Neighborhood of Detroit
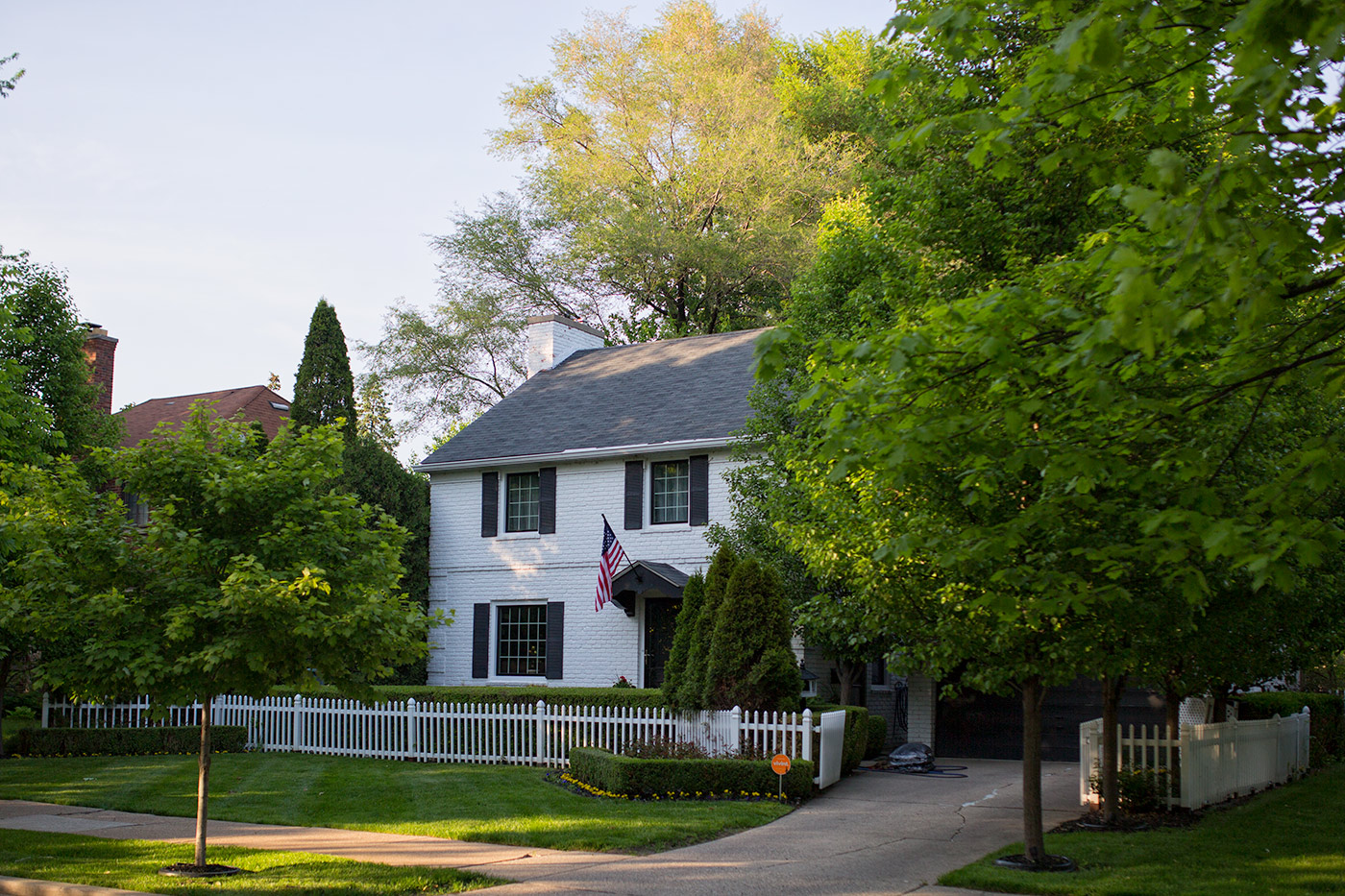
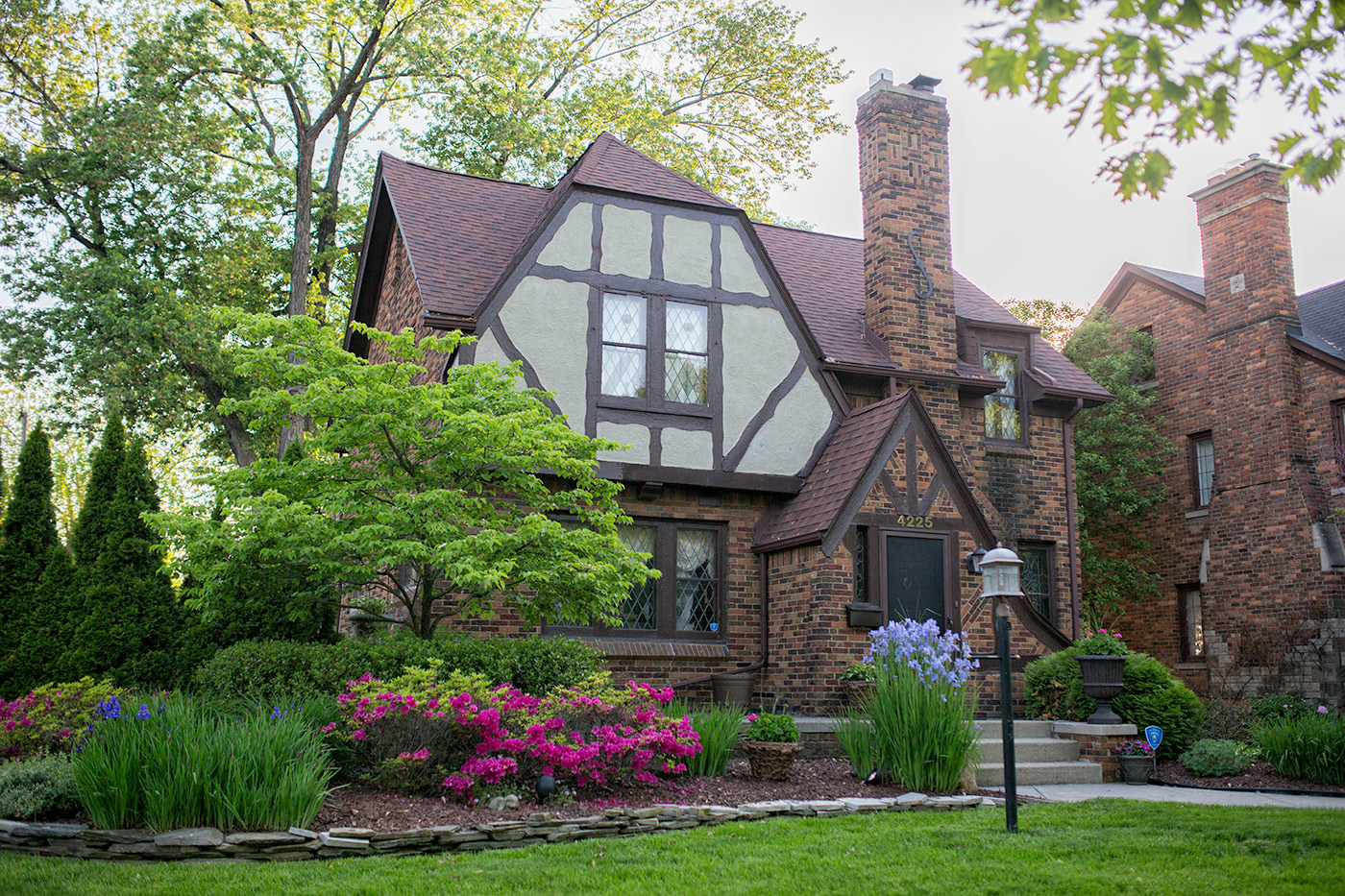
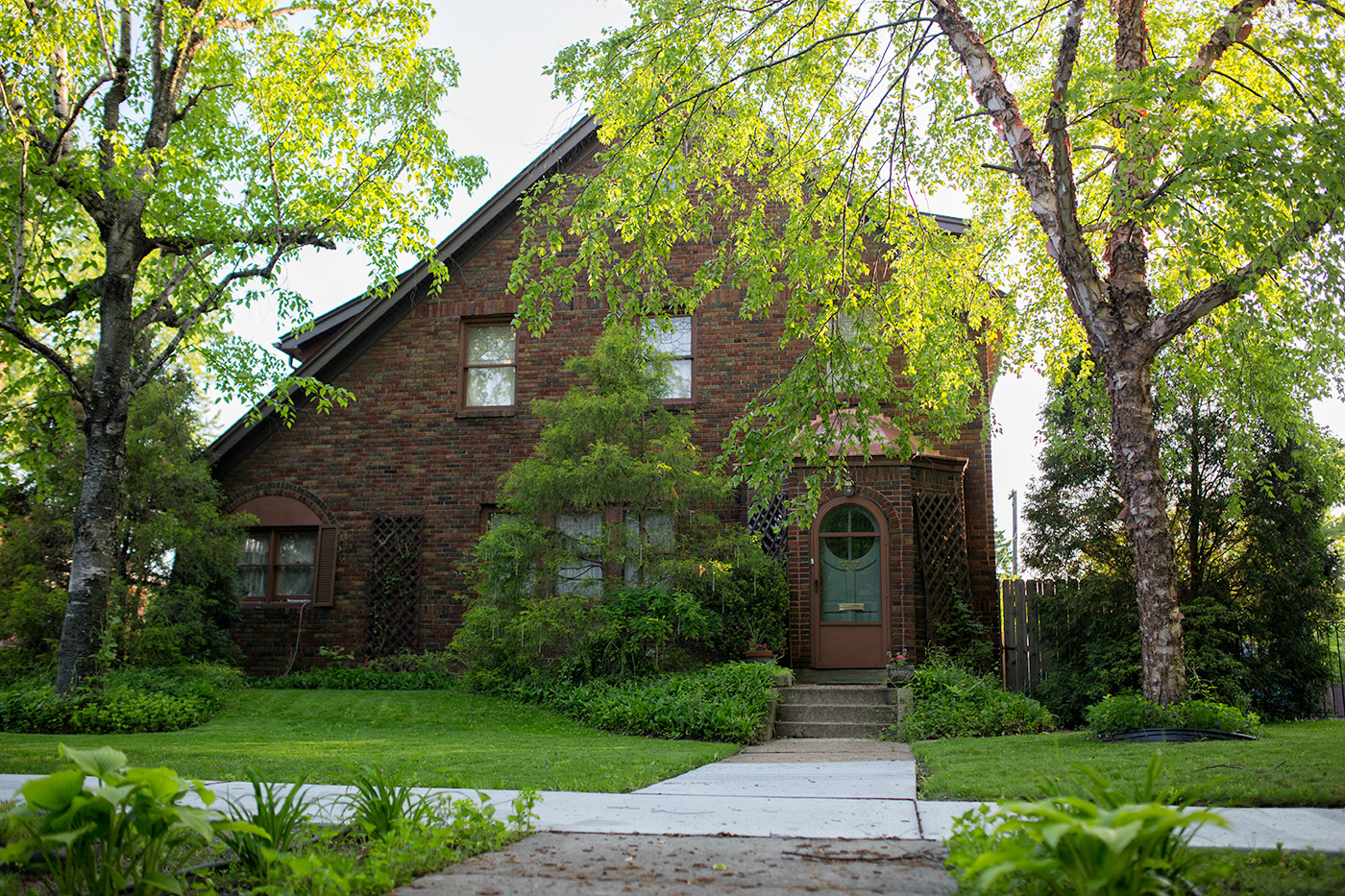
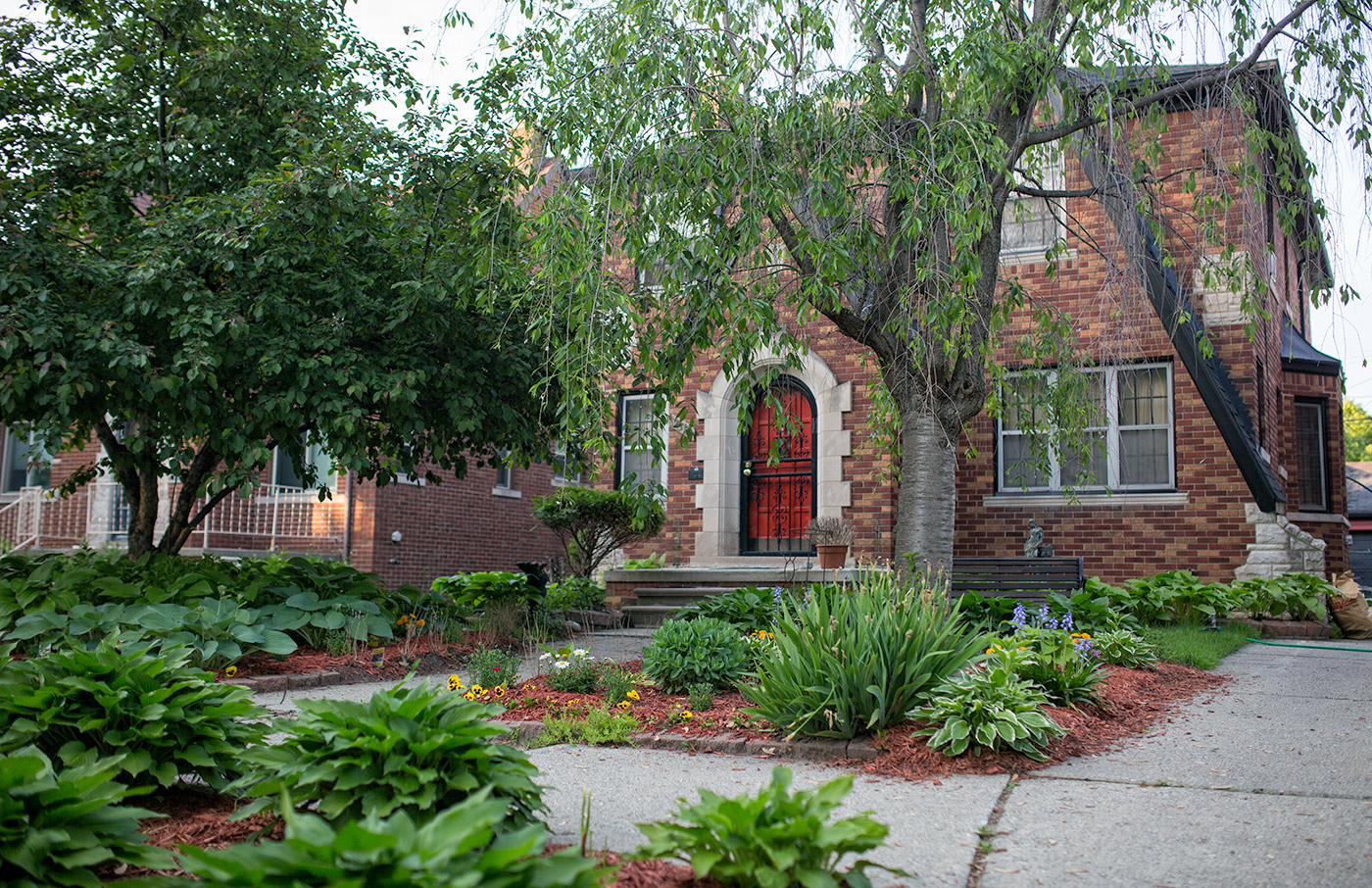
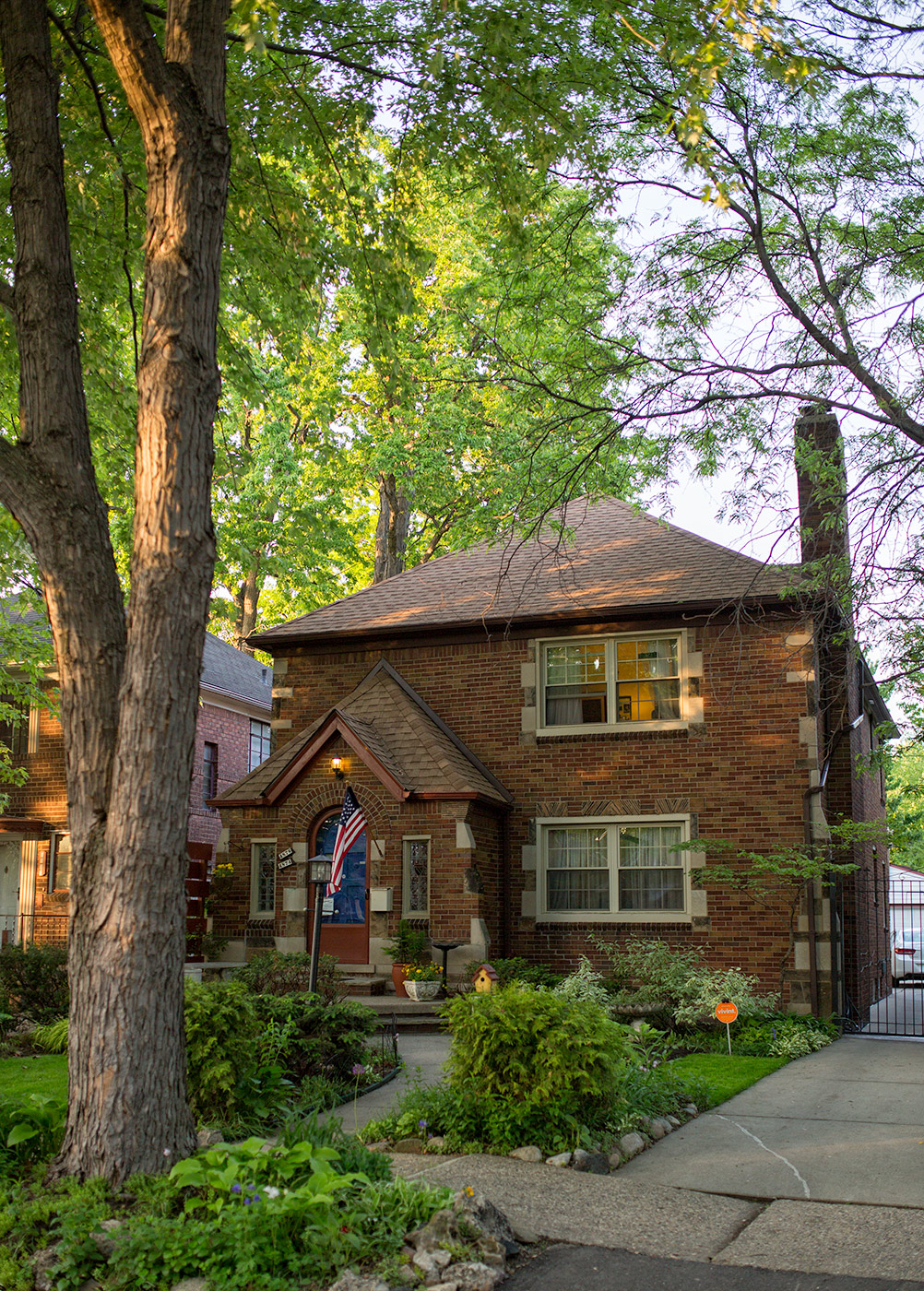
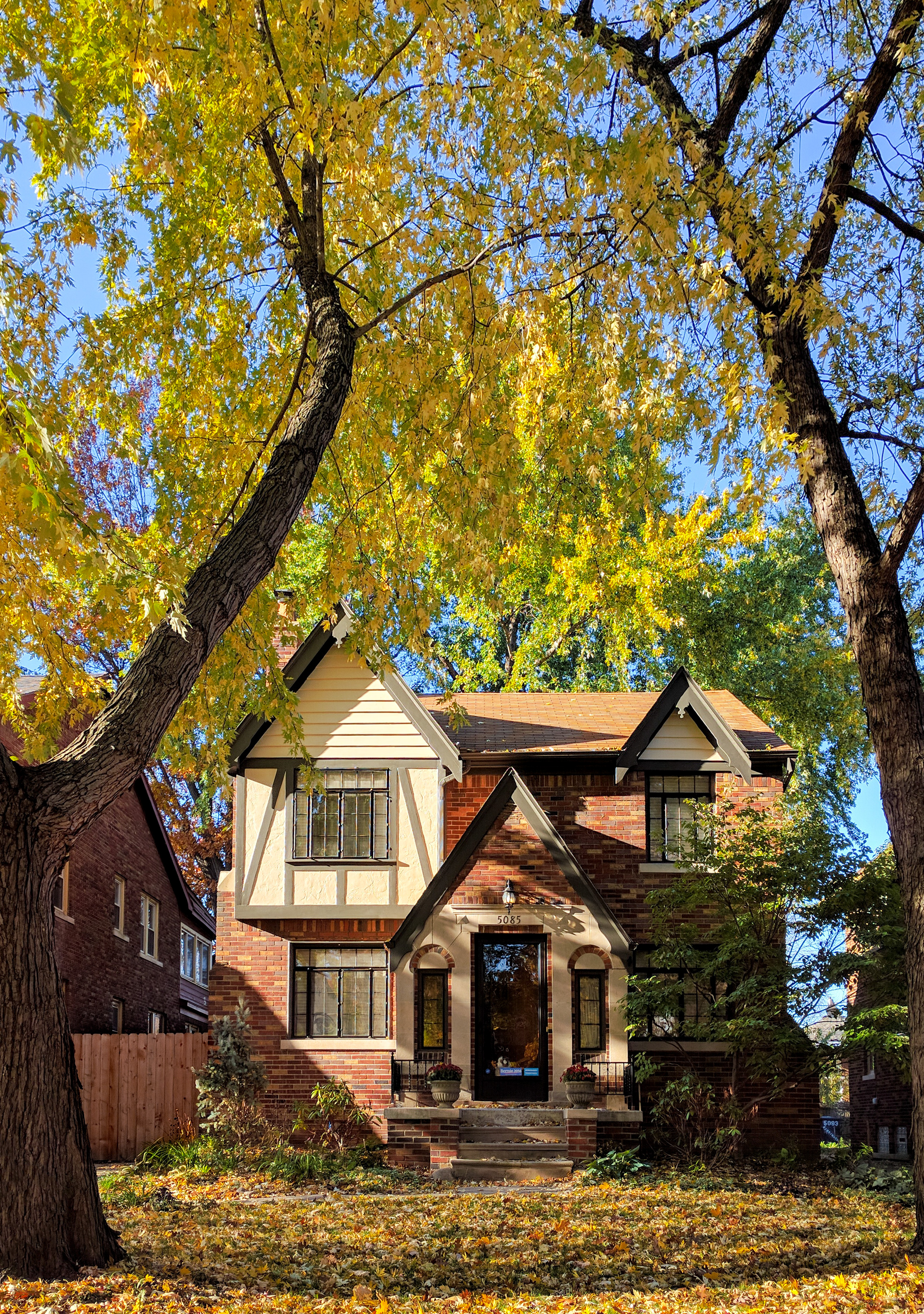
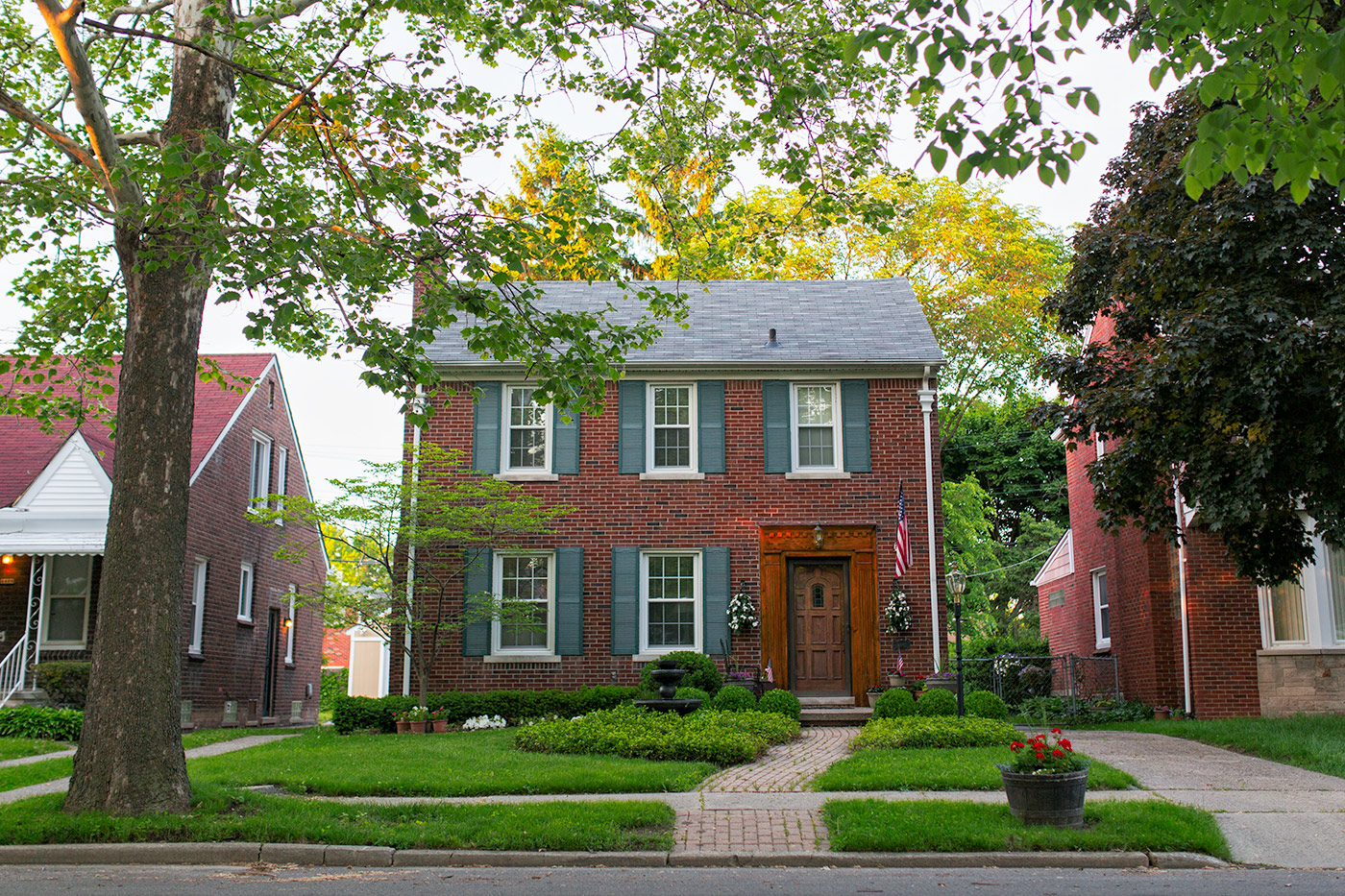
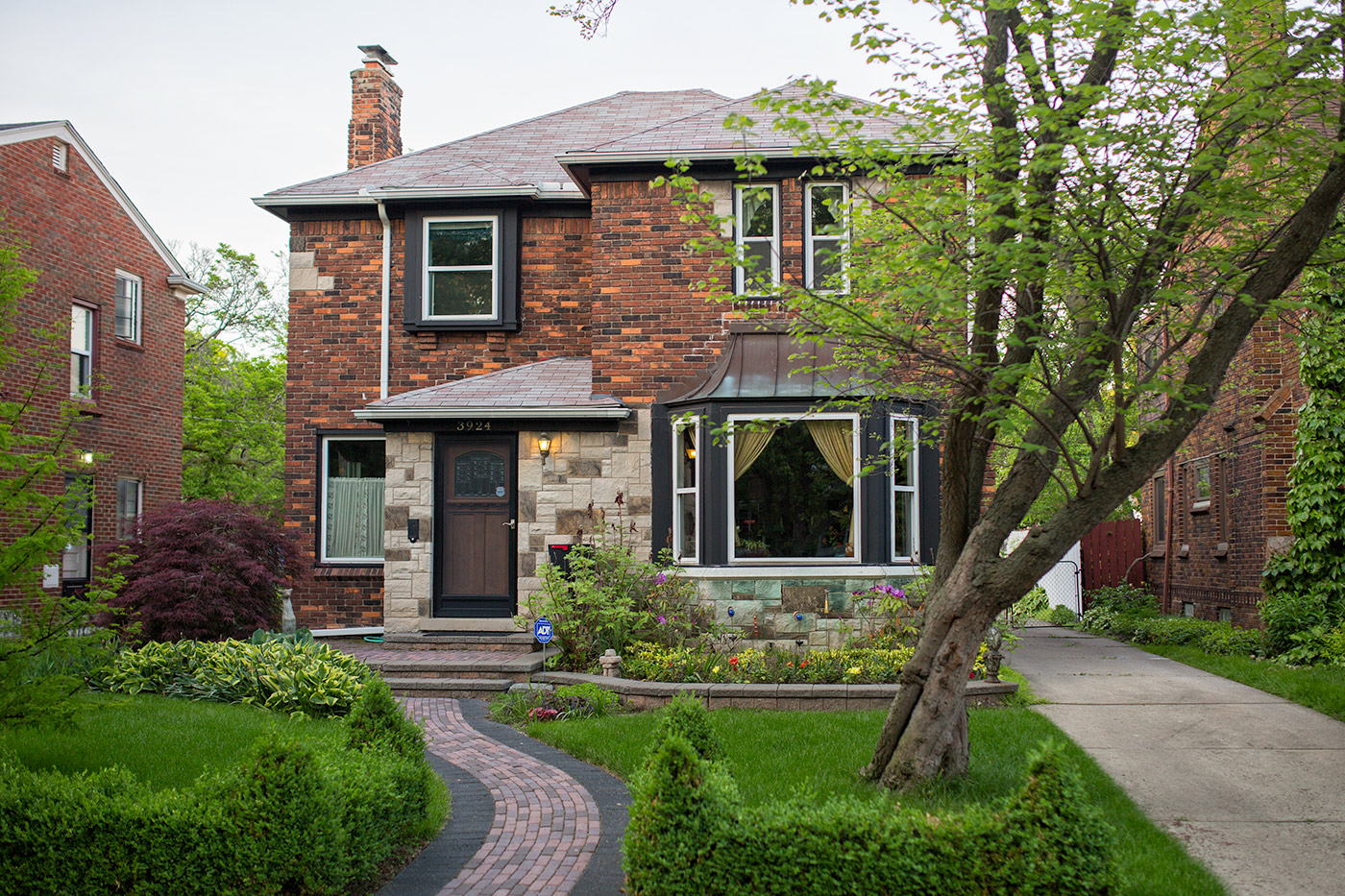
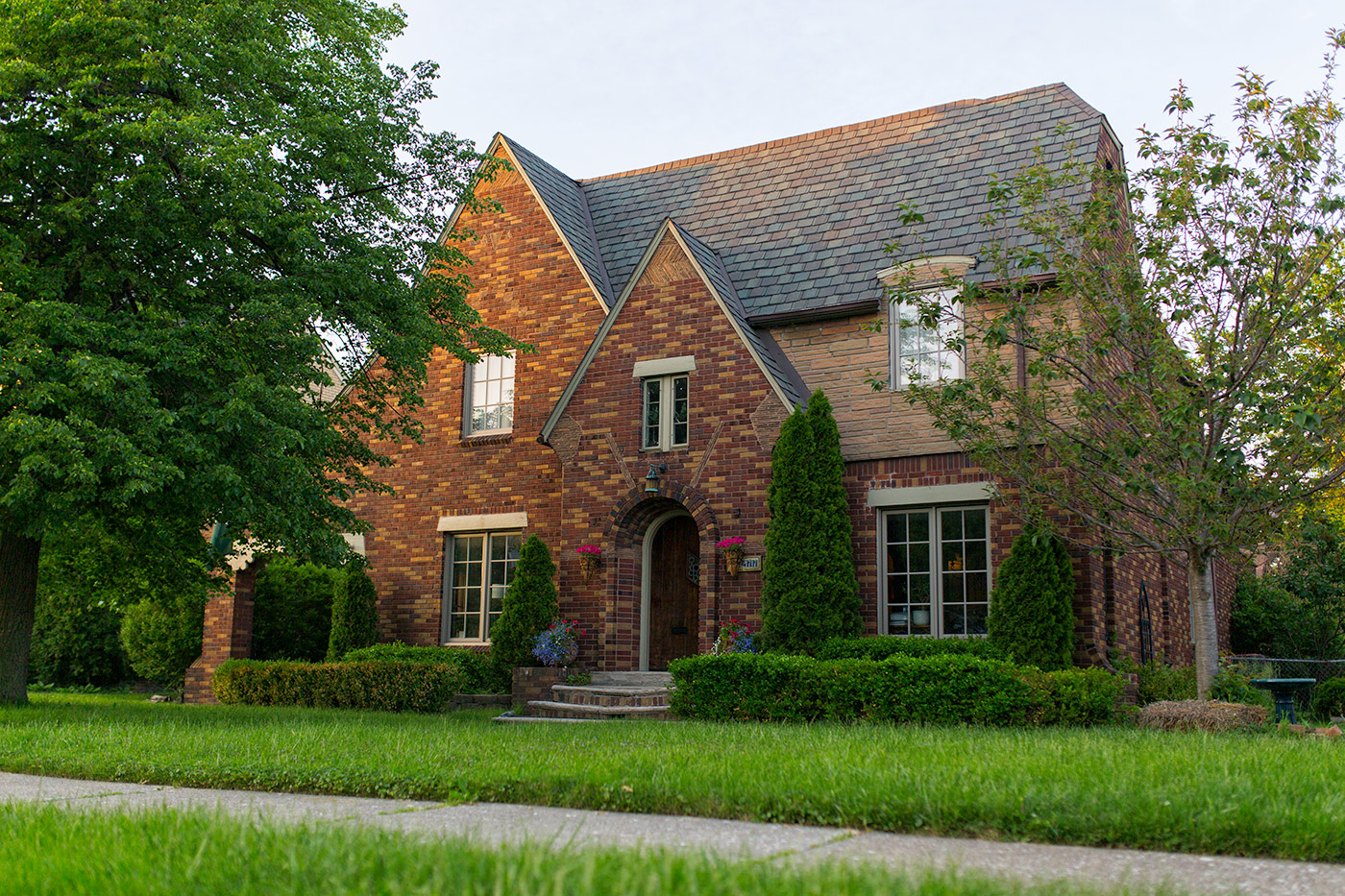
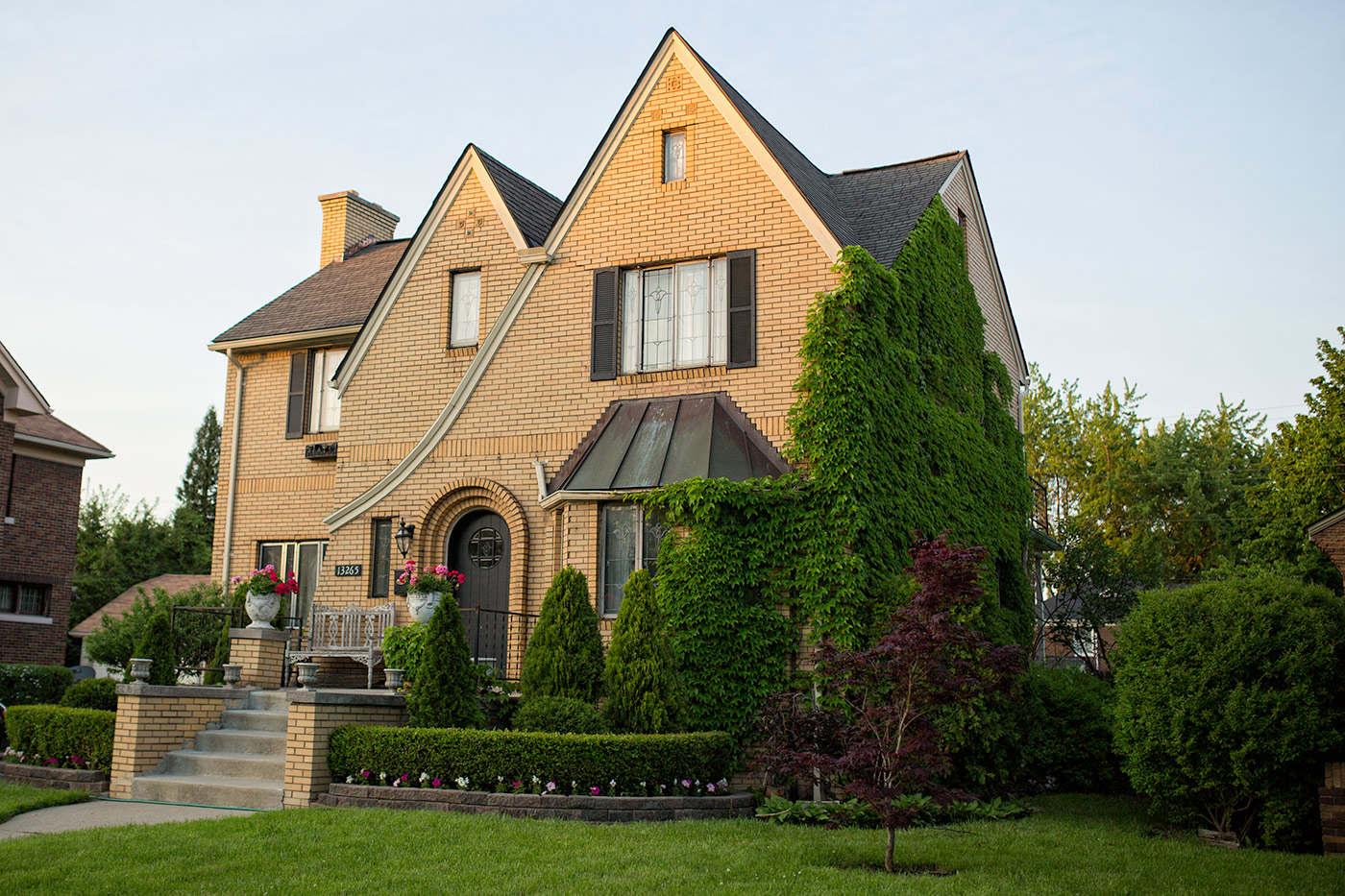
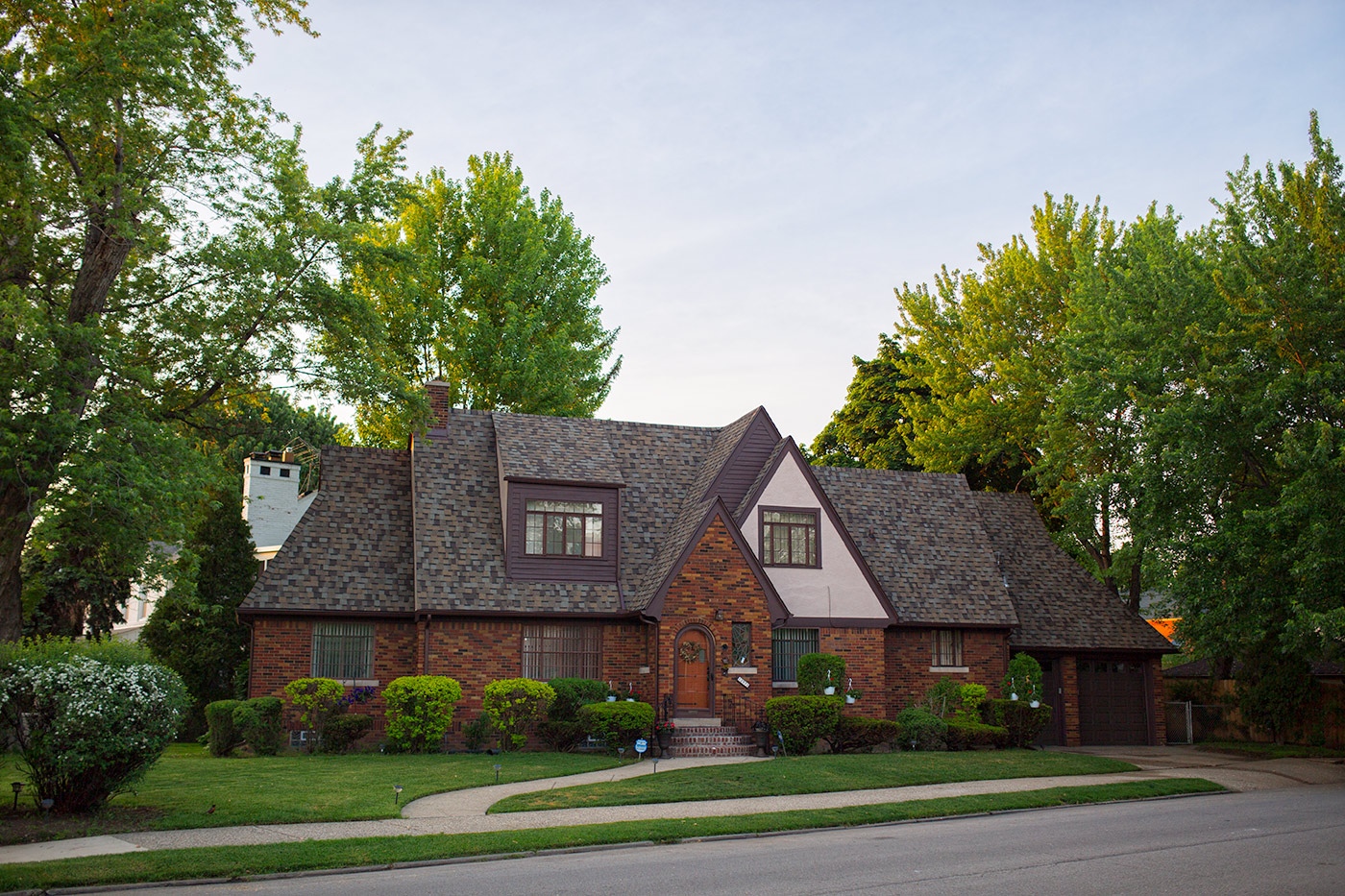
- Typical residential homes in East English Village

- Location within the city of Detroit East English Village (Michigan)
- Coordinates: 42°24′18″N 82°55′58″W
- Country: United States
- State: Michigan
- County: Wayne County
- City: Detroit
- Website: www.eastenglishvillage.org

East English Village is a neighborhood in Detroit, Michigan, bounded by Harper Avenue on the north, East Outer Drive on the west, Mack Avenue on the south, and Cadieux Road on the east. It was first developed in 1913 though most of the homes were built in the early 1930s through 1950.

== History ==
=== 1800s ===
In the 1800s, five ‘ribbon farms’ extended from Harper to the Detroit River. In 1805, the territory of Michigan was created, with Detroit as the capital. Between 1808 and 1810, five ribbon farms were registered under the family names of Little, Rivard, Fournier and Tremble. These five farms were later subdivided into the area we now know as East English Village.

In 1818, the farms became part of the new Hamtramck Township, and in 1848 the area was renamed Grosse Pointe Township. By the turn of the 20th century, the city boundaries of Detroit began to expand, and the area was transformed into an attractive residential community.

=== 1910-20s ===
First subdivisions: from Grosse Pointe Manor to Scully's Voigt farmlands The first subdivision, once part of Moran Farms, was named Grosse Pointe Manor, was developed in 1913. This subdivision ran along Audubon, Whittier and Kensington streets between Mack and East Warren. Grosse Pointe Villa, another subdivision, was developed around 1915 and included the east side of Poupard (now called Yorkshire) from Mack to East Warren. Between 1926 and 1930, Yorkshire was developed between East Warren and Harper as Poupard Woodlands. Simultaneously, Bishop, between Mack and East Warren, was being developed as Poupard Estates. In 1924, the Eastern Heights Land Company began to develop land along both sides of Kensington between East Warren and Harper. Also in 1924, The Charles Dunn Trust, Paul Deronne and the Voigt family developed the Scully's Voigt farmlands on Harvard and Cadieux between Mack and Harper.

Construction began to take off in 1928 By 1925, most of the area had been subdivided into residential parcels. The actual construction of the homes did not really begin to boom until 1928, with much of the building taking place in the early 1930s. The owners, not the developers, hired builders; this turned the new homeowners into designers and enabled them to custom order their homes. This accounts for the unique characteristics of each home.

The people who came to build their homes in this area were mostly professionals. The area known as East English Village attracted police officers, civil servants, doctors, lawyers, businessmen - especially those from the auto industry.

=== 1950s ===
In 1950, construction had ceased The number of families in the neighborhood settled to approximately 2100, and most homes only changed hands a few times. Many residents who have lived in East English Village, lived their entire lives in this community.

=== 1990s ===
In 1999 The Detroit News said that East English Village had "emerged as one of Detroit's most desirable neighborhoods".

=== 2000s ===
In 2006 Marisol Bello of the Detroit Free Press said that East English Village was "one of Detroit's most stable" neighborhoods.

In 2006 the community campaigned for a revival grant that would be granted in 2007. By 2011 the Detroit Land Bank Authority (DLBA) used Neighborhood Stabilization Program funds to purchase foreclosed houses in East English Village, and a home tour of these houses was conducted before year's end.

=== 2010s ===
In 2011 Mayor of Detroit Dave Bing offered over 200 tax-foreclosed houses in East English Village and Boston-Edison to police officers to convince them to stay in the city.

CNN and Money stated in 2012 that "Detroit's East English Village is a well-kept neighborhood of tree-lined streets". In Curbed Detroit's 2016 Curbed Cup, East English Village was voted "Best Neighborhood in Detroit".

== Cityscape ==
East English Village is north of Grosse Pointe. Housing styles include bungalows, Cape Cod houses, colonial houses, and Tudor houses. In 1999 The Detroit News said that East English Village had "emerged as one of Detroit's most desirable neighborhoods" in Detroit because the houses were relatively inexpensive but built with high quality materials and designs.

== Government and infrastructure ==
The East English Village Association is the community association. It's an active association, most residents being involved with the community. They have monthly meetings with newsletters, a Facebook page and a Neighborhood forum. The community has set up a donation fund that pays for private security, private street plowing for heavy snows, best garden and decoration contests and community clean up efforts.

== Education ==
Residents are zoned to Detroit Public Schools. Marquette Elementary-Middle School for Pre-K through 8th grade. East English Village Preparatory Academy is on the site of the former Finney High School for 9th through 12th grade. The school opened in 2012. Saint Clare of Montefalco is a Catholic elementary school alternative located on Whittier.
