= Tim Bledsoe =

American politician from Michigan

Member of the Michigan House of Representatives from the 1st district
- In office January 1, 2009 – December 31, 2012
- Preceded by: Edward Gaffney
- Succeeded by: Brian Banks

Personal details
- Born: June 18, 1953 (age 73) Lake Village, Arkansas
- Party: Democratic
- Spouse: Mary Herring
- Profession: Political Science Professor

Timothy Bledsoe (born June 18, 1953) is a politician and college professor from the U.S. state of Michigan. In 2008, he was elected as a Democrat to the Michigan State House of Representatives, taking office in 2009 and serving until 2012. He represented the 1st District, which was located in Wayne County and included the cities of Harper Woods, Grosse Pointe, Grosse Pointe Farms, Grosse Pointe Park, Grosse Pointe Shores, Grosse Pointe Woods, and a small portion of Detroit. He previously served as a political science professor at Wayne State University.

== Early life ==
Timothy Bledsoe was born on June 18, 1953, in Lake Village, Arkansas. He graduated from Lakeside High School in Lake Village in 1971. He received a B.A. in Political Science from Louisiana State University in 1976. In 1978, he received an M.A. in Political Science from the University of Arkansas. He received a Ph.D. in Political Science from the University of Nebraska–Lincoln in 1984.

After receiving his Ph.D., Bledsoe began teaching political science at the University of South Carolina, where he taught until 1989. In 1989, Bledsoe moved to Grosse Pointe, Michigan and took a job teaching at Wayne State University, where he taught until elected to the State House in 2008. Bledsoe has written several books on the study of urban politics, including Careers in City Politics, and Urban Reform and its Consequences. He is married to Dr. Mary Herring, also a professor at Wayne State. They have one daughter, named Daisy, and are members of Christ Church Grosse Pointe in Grosse Pointe Farms.

== Political career ==
Map of Wayne County with the 1st District outlined in Bold

Tim Bledsoe was a precinct organizer for Democratic Presidential Candidate John Kerry during the 2004 presidential election. In 2006, he unsuccessfully challenged sitting State Representative Edward Gaffney for his seat in the State House. Bledsoe ran again for the 1st District in 2008, when term limits required Gaffney to step down. Bledsoe won the 2008 Democratic Primary that also included Harper Woods mayor Kenneth Poynter with nearly 55% of the vote. He faced Republican Mary Treder Lang in the general election. He defeated her with 57% of the vote.

== Electoral history ==
- **2008 election for State House**
  - Tim Bledsoe (D), 56.78%
  - Mary Treder Lang (R), 43.22%
- **2008 Democratic Primary election for State House**
  - Tim Bledsoe (D), 54.92%
  - Kenneth Poynter (D), 38.12%
  - Edward Ruedemann (D), 3.51%
  - Ronald Diebel (D), 3.46%
- **2006 election for State House**
  - Ed Gaffney (R), 52%
  - Tim Bledsoe (D), 46%
- **2006 Democratic Primary election for State House**
  - Tim Bledsoe (D), 49%
  - Je Donna Dinges (D), 29%
  - William Miller (D), 21%
