= Tory Rocca =

American politician (born 1973)

Member of the Michigan Senate from the 10th district
- In office January 1, 2011 – December 31, 2018
- Preceded by: Michael Switalski
- Succeeded by: Michael D. MacDonald

Member of the Michigan House of Representatives from the 30th district
- In office January 1, 2005 – December 31, 2010
- Preceded by: Sal Rocca
- Succeeded by: Jeff Farrington

Personal details
- Born: 1973 (age 52–53) Sterling Heights, Michigan, U.S.
- Party: Republican
- Parents: Sal Rocca (father); Sue Rocca (mother)
- Education: University of Michigan

Tory Rocca (born 1973) is an American lawyer and former politician who represented the 10th district of the Michigan Senate from 2011 until 2018.

== Early life ==
In 1973, Rocca was born in Sterling Heights, Michigan. Rocca's father is Sal Rocca and his step-mother is Sue Rocca. Rocca's parents both are politicians in Michigan and previously served in the Michigan House of Representatives.

== Education ==
Rocca earned a bachelor's degree from the University of Michigan. In 1995, Rocca earned a BBA degree from the University of Michigan Business School. In 1999, Rocca earned a JD from University of Michigan Law School.

== Career ==
In the 1970s, at about 5 years old, Rocca became involved in politics, where he volunteered in political campaigns.

Rocca was a lab technician for Johnson Controls.

In 2000, Rocca passed the Michigan Bar. Rocca practiced business law and product liability law.

In November 2004, Rocca was elected as member of the Michigan State House of Representatives for District 30.

In November 2010, Rocca was elected as member of Michigan State Senate for District 10.

Rocca was the chairman of the Regulatory Reform Committee in the Senate and he was the vice-chair of the Joint Committee on Administrative Rules.

As of June 2018, due to term limits, Rocca will not be able to run for another term. In November 2018, Rocca's District 10 seat was won by Michael MacDonald.

== See also ==
- 2004 Michigan House of Representatives election
- 2014 Michigan Senate election
