= Black River (St. Clair River tributary) =

River in Michigan, United States

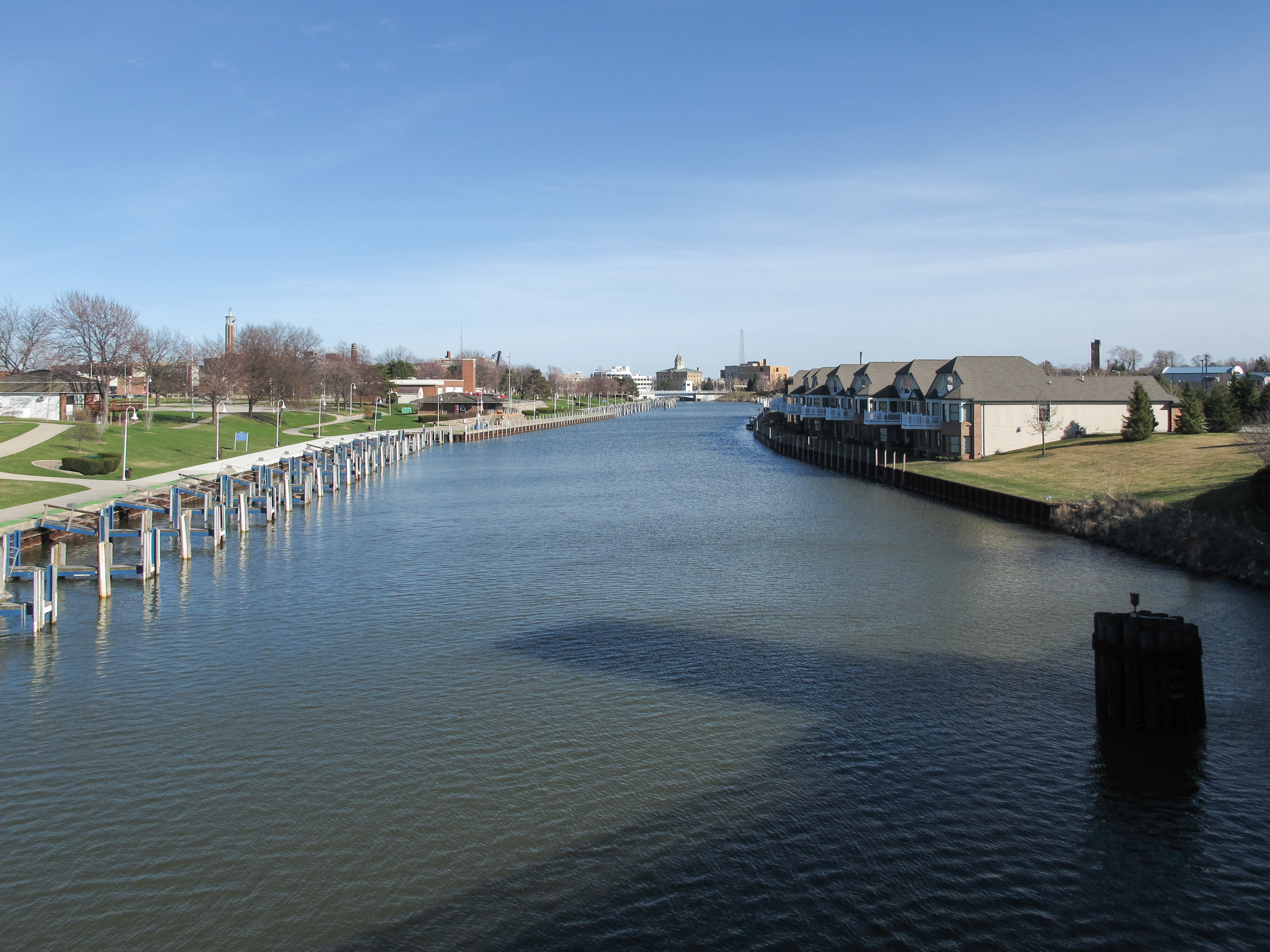
- The Black River in Port Huron

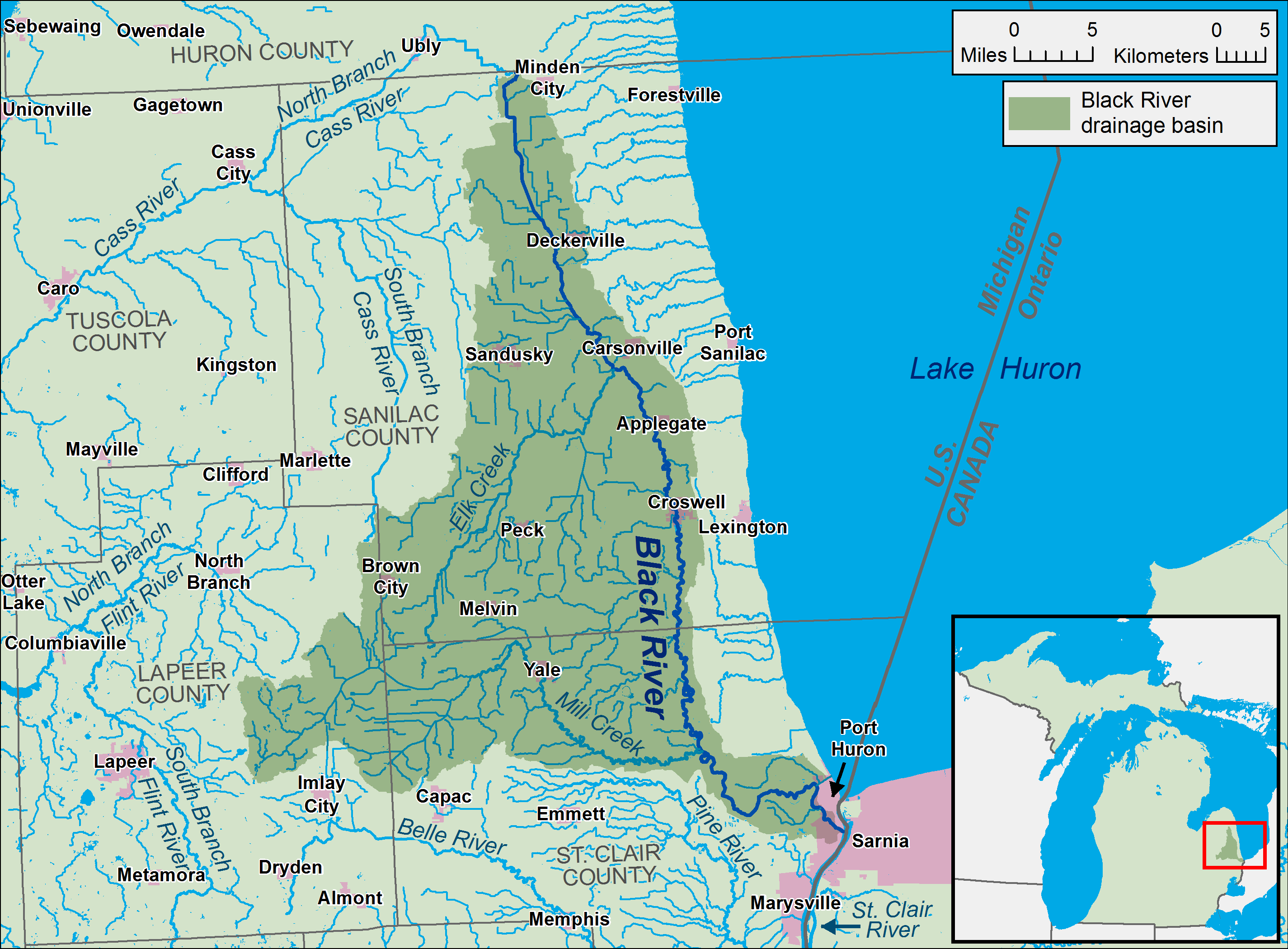
- A map of the Black River and its watershed

Location
- Country: United States
- State: Michigan
- Counties: Sanilac, St. Clair

Physical characteristics
- Source
  - location: northern Sanilac County
  - coordinates: 43°41′00″N 82°48′55″W
- Mouth
  - location: St. Clair River, Port Huron
  - coordinates: 42°58′19″N 82°25′06″W
  - elevation: 574 ft (175 m)
- Length: 81 miles (130 km)
- Basin size: 711 mi^{2} (1,840 km^{2})

Black River is an 81.0-mile-long (130.4 km) river in the U.S. state of Michigan, flowing into the St. Clair River in the city of Port Huron. The Black River Canal in northern Port Huron extends east into Lake Huron near Krafft Road.

The river rises in northern Sanilac County, near the boundary with Huron County, and its 711-square-mile (1,840 km^{2}) drainage basin covers most of the central and southern portions of Sanilac County, most of northern St. Clair County, and portions of east central Lapeer County. Large sections of the upper portion of the river and much of its drainage basin are heavily channelized for agricultural irrigation. Black River was the original name of the city of Croswell at the time of its founding in 1845.

== Tributaries ==
=== Main stream from the mouth to Mill Creek ===
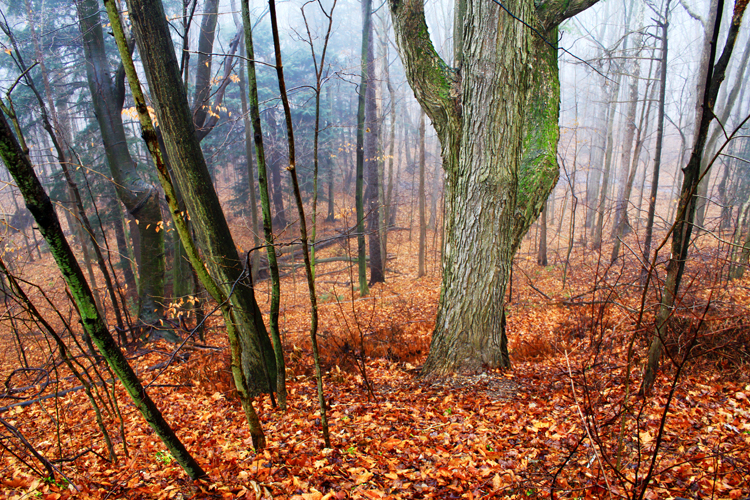
Looking down into the Black River Valley on a foggy morning.

- (left) Stocks Creek
  - (right) Price Drain
  - (left) Baldwin Drain
- (right) Black River Canal
  - Howe Drain
    - (left) Warner Drain
    - (right) Brandymore Drain

=== Mill Creek ===
- (left) Mill Creek
  - (left) Gleason Drain
  - (left) White Drain
  - (left) Sheehy Drain
    - (right) Thody Drain
  - (left) Thompson Drain
  - (right) Sanilac and Saint Clair Drain
    - (right) Cole Drain
  - (right) Ohmer Drain
  - (left) Middleton Drain
  - (left) Meharg Drain

==== North Branch Mill Creek ====
- (right) North Branch Mill Creek
  - (right) Wait Drain
  - (right) Root Drain
    - (right) Kenney Drain
  - (left) Flansburg Drain
  - (left) East Goodland Drain
  - (right) Willoughby Drain
    - (left) Evans and McKillen Drain
    - (left) Willoughby Branch
      - (right) Scott Drain
      - (left) Toman Drain
  - (right) Clarkson Drain
    - (left) Courter Drain
  - (right) Madison Drain
  - (left) Stevenson Drain
    - (right) West Branch Stevenson Drain
  - (left) Crowe Drain
  - (right) Wilkie Drain
  - (left) Anchor Drain

===== Elk Lake Creek =====
- (left) Elk Lake Creek
  - (right) Brant Lake Drain
    - (right) Pickerel Lake
      - Devall Drain
    - (right) Simmons Lake
    - (left) Cranberry Lake
      - Mitchell Lakes
    - (right) Winn Drain
  - Stanton Lakes
    - Rose Lake
  - (right) Mud Lake Drain
    - Mud Lake
  - (left) Lombar Drain
    - (right) Cadillac Drain
  - (right) Swamp Corners Drain
    - (right) Barber Drain
    - (left) Elgin Drain
  - Elk Lake

==== South Branch Mill Creek ====
- South Branch Mill Creek
  - (right) Frasier Drain
  - (right) Black Segate Reid Drain
  - (left) Lynn Mussey Drain
    - (left) Kaufman Drain
  - (left) Kolb Drain
  - (right) Galley Drain
  - (left) Weitzig Drain
  - (left) Mudcat Drain
    - (left) Wendt Drain
    - Petz Lake
      - Hughes Drain
        - Sans Lake
          - Baines Lake
            - Jurn Drain
  - (left) Bunde Drain
  - (right) Brandy Run

=== Main stream from Mill Creek to Black Creek ===
- (left) Glyshaw Drain
- (left) O'Dette Drain
- (left) Plum Creek
  - (right) Engles Drain
    - (left) Pohly Drain
- (left) Silver Creek
  - (right) Wilson Drain
    - (left) Fueslein Drain
  - (right) Eves Drain
  - (left) Jackson Drain
    - (right) Hayes Drain
- (left) Mason Drain

=== Black Creek ===
- (left) Black Creek (also known as Seymour Creek)
  - (right) William Doan Drain
  - (left) Allen Drain
  - (right) Seymour Creek (also spelled Seymore Creek)
    - (right) Lawson Drain
    - (left) Crouce Drain
    - (right) Perry Drain (also known as Seymour Creek)
    - (left) Bradley Creek
  - (left) Willey Drain
  - (left) Jackson Creek
    - (left) Robertson Drain
      - (right) Livergood Drain
    - (left) Teets Drain
  - (right) McIntyre and Willing Drain
  - (left) Lavell Drain

=== Main stream from Black Creek to Elk Creek ===
- (left) Mills Creek
- (left) Arnot Creek
  - (left) McClelland Drain
  - (right) Smith Drain
  - (left) Taylor Drain
- (right) Freeman Drain
- (left) Wagner Drain
- (left) Papst Drain
  - (right) Murray Drain
- (right) Kelly Creek
  - (left) Kelly Drain

=== Elk Creek ===
- (left) Elk Creek (also known as Elk River)
  - (right) Recor Drain
  - (right) Meyers Drain
  - (right) Alexander Drain
    - McPherson Drain
  - (right) Methven Drain
  - (left)Potts Drain (also known as Potts Creek)
    - (right) Rickett Drain
    - (right) Miller Drain
    - (left) Roskey Drain
      - (left) Harlan Drain
    - (left) Baum Drain
    - (right) Rickett Drain
    - (left) French Drain
    - (right) Spring Creek Drain
      - (left) Cork Drain
        - (right) Putney Drain
    - (right) Engle Drain
    - (left) Topping Drain
    - (right) Thomas Drain
    - (left) Hunt Drain
    - (right) Cline Drain
  - (right) Watertown State Drain
    - (right) Lynch Drain
  - (left) Parks Drain
  - (left) Mullen Drain
  - (right) Smalldon Drain
  - (right) Colebough Drain
  - (right) Beals Frizzle Drain
    - (left) Hale Drain
      - (right) Johnson Barrett Drain
      - (right) Eggert Drain
        - (left) Cummer Drain
          - (right) Severance Drain
  - (right) McElhinney Drain
    - (right) Barr Drain
  - (right) McDonald Drain
    - (right) Phillips Drain
    - (right) Eagle Drain
    - (left) Setter Drain
      - (right) Welch Drain
  - (left) Powers Drain
  - (left) East Branch Speaker and Maple Valley Drain
    - (left) Fletcher Drain
      - (left) McGauley Drain
        - (right) Bowers Drain
      - (left) Bowers Drain
    - (right) Shell Drain
    - (right) Macklem Drain
    - (left) Mullaney Drain
      - (left) Beemer Drain
      - (right) Weston Drain
  - (right) Elk Flynn and Maple Valley Drain
    - (left) Jones Drain
      - (left) Omard Drain
  - (left) Smafield Drain
  - (right) Lapeer and Sanilac Drain
  - (left) Hydorn Drain
  - (left) Valley Center Drain
  - (right) Varney Drain
  - (left) York Drain
  - (right) Scott Drain

=== Main stream above Elk Creek ===
- (right) Carsonville Drain
- (left) McPherson Drain
- (right) McDonald Drain
- (right) Shrapnell Drain
- (left) Berry Drain
  - (right) Fye Drain
    - (left) Baerwolf Drain
    - (right) Kinney Drain
    - (right) Graves Drain
    - (left) Custer County Drain
  - (right) Dwight Drain
    - (left) Dunlap Drain
    - (left) Stone Drain
      - (left) Howse Drain
    - (left) Badgero Drain
    - (right) Bradshaw Drain
  - Dunlap Drain
  - (left) Black Drain
- (left) Wilkins Drain
- (left) O'Connell Drain
- (left) Nicol Drain
  - (right) Anderson Drain
    - (left) Freel Drain
- (right) Pyette Drain
  - Deckerville Reservoir
- (left) Smith Drain
- (right) Flannigan Drain
- (right) Pelton Drain
  - (right) Grandy Drain
- (left) Thompson Drain
- (right) Bishop Drain
  - (left) McManus Drain
  - (right) Terpinning Drain
- (left) Carrol Drain
  - Monroe Drain
    - Richie Drain
      - Hewitt Drain
- (left) Hewitt Carroll Drain
- (right) Darlington Drain
  - (right) Doggan Drain
- (right) Lloyd Drain

== Drainage basin ==
=== Lapeer County ===
- Arcadia Township
- Attica Township
- Burnside Township
- Goodland Township
- Imlay Township

=== St. Clair County ===
- Brockway Township
- Clyde Township
- Emmett Township
- Fort Gratiot Township
- Grant Township
- Greenwood Township
- Kenockee Township
- Kimball Township
- Lynn Township
- Mussey Township
- Port Huron
- Port Huron Township
- Yale

=== Sanilac County ===
- Applegate
- Argyle Township
- Bridgehampton Township
- Brown City
- Buel Township
- Carsonville
- Croswell
- Custer Township
- Deckerville
- Delaware Township
- Elk Township
- Elmer Township
- Flynn Township
- Fremont Township
- Lexington Township
- Maple Valley Township
- Marion Township
- Melvin
- Minden Township
- Moore Township
- Peck
- Sandusky
- Sanilac Township
- Speaker Township
- Washington Township
- Watertown Township
- Wheatland Township
- Worth Township
