= Sandusky Community Schools =

School district in Michigan

Sanilac Community Schools

Address
- 191 East Pinetree Lane Sandusky, Sanilac County, Michigan, 48471; United States

District information
- Grades: PreKindergarten–12
- Superintendent: Kurt Dennis
- Schools: 2
- Budget: $13,293,000 2022-2023 expenditures
- NCES District ID: 2630840

Students and staff
- Students: 931 (2024-2025)
- Teachers: 57.78 (on an FTE basis) (2024-2025)
- Staff: 124.97 FTE (2024-2025)
- Student–teacher ratio: 16.11 (2024-2025)

Other information
- Website: www.sandusky.k12.mi.us

Sandusky Community Schools is a public school district in Sanilac County, in the Thumb region of Michigan. It serves Sandusky and parts of the townships of Argyle, Bridgehampton, Buel, Custer, Elk, Elmer, Flynn, Moore, Washington, Watertown, and Wheatland.

== History ==
The current Sandusky Junior/Senior High School opened in August 1993. Construction was funded by a bond issue that also converted the former high school (built in 1965) to a middle school and funded a renovation at Maple Valley Elementary.

Maple Valley Elementary closed at the end of the 2012–2013 school year, and its students were relocated to the former middle school building. The middle school was consolidated with the high school in the high school building, forming Sandusky Junior/Senior High School. In 2022, the former Maple Valley Elementary building was sold to the Sanilac County Health Board.

In 2022, the school board voted to discontinue use of the Redskins mascot, which had been in place since 1940, citing concerns about the offensive stereotypes associated with Native American imagery. Later that year, the district considered The Storm, The Ravens, and The Knights as potential replacements; however, when no consensus emerged, the search for a new mascot was suspended.

== Schools ==
Schools in Sandusky Community Schools district
School	Address	Notes
Sandusky Junior/Senior High School	191 E. Pinetree Lane, Sandusky	Grades 7–12; built 1993
Sandusky Elementary	395 S. Sandusky Road, Sandusky	Grades PreK–6; built 1965
