= Moore Township, Michigan =

- Township
- Location within the state of Michigan Moore Township, Michigan (the United States)
- Coordinates: 43°28′11″N 82°57′15″W
- Country: United States
- State: Michigan
- County: Sanilac

Area
  - Total: 36.3 sq mi (94.0 km^{2})
  - Land: 36.3 sq mi (94.0 km^{2})
  - Water: 0 sq mi (0.0 km^{2})
- Elevation: 781 ft (238 m)

Population (2020)
  - Total: 1,110
  - Density: 30.6/sq mi (11.8/km^{2})
- Time zone: UTC-5 (Eastern (EST))
  - Summer (DST): UTC-4 (EDT)
- ZIP codes: 48471 (Sandusky, 48472 (Snover)
- FIPS code: 26-55320
- GNIS feature ID: 1626764
- Website: https://mooremi.gov/

Moore Township is a civil township of Sanilac County in the U.S. state of Michigan. As of the 2020 census, it had a population of 1,110.

The first permanent white settler was James Minard, who arrived in 1860. Martin Moore followed in 1864 and became the first supervisor when the township was organized in 1865.

== Communities ==
- Elmer is an unincorporated community at the junction of M-19 and M-46 along the southern boundary of the township with Elmer Township at 43°25′11″N 82°55′45″W
- Snover is an unincorporated community in the western part of the township at 43°27′40″N 82°58′15″W. The Snover ZIP code 48472 serves the western and northern portions of the township as well most of Argyle Township and smaller areas in northwest Elmer Township and northeast Marlette Township, eastern Lamotte Township, eastern Evergreen Township southwest Austin Township, western Wheatland Township, and northeast Custer Township. The community was named for Horace G. Snover, who represented the area in Congress from 1895 to 1898.
- The City of Sandusky is located to the southeast and the Sandusky ZIP code, 48471 serves the southern and eastern portions of the township.

== Geography ==
According to the United States Census Bureau, the township has a total area of 36.3 square miles (94 km^{2}), all land.

== Demographics ==
As of the census of 2000, there were 1,262 people, 442 households, and 339 families residing in the township. The population density was 34.8 inhabitants per square mile (13.4/km^{2}). There were 477 housing units at an average density of 13.1 per square mile (5.1/km^{2}). The racial makeup of the township was 98.10% White, 0.95% from other races, and 0.95% from two or more races. Hispanic or Latino of any race were 1.90% of the population.

There were 442 households, out of which 38.0% had children under the age of 18 living with them, 66.1% were married couples living together, 6.3% had a female householder with no husband present, and 23.1% were non-families. 18.3% of all households were made up of individuals, and 10.0% had someone living alone who was 65 years of age or older. The average household size was 2.82 and the average family size was 3.20.

In the township the population was spread out, with 29.0% under the age of 18, 8.2% from 18 to 24, 30.0% from 25 to 44, 21.6% from 45 to 64, and 11.2% who were 65 years of age or older. The median age was 34 years. For every 100 females, there were 95.4 males. For every 100 females age 18 and over, there were 96.9 males.

The median income for a household in the township was $39,792, and the median income for a family was $46,250. Males had a median income of $34,118 versus $21,898 for females. The per capita income for the township was $19,424. About 6.4% of families and 9.4% of the population were below the poverty line, including 10.2% of those under age 18 and 14.1% of those age 65 or over.
