= Custer Township, Sanilac County, Michigan =

Custer Township, Michigan
- Township
- Location within the state of Michigan Custer Township, Michigan (the United States)
- Coordinates: 43°27′56″N 82°48′41″W
- Country: United States
- State: Michigan
- County: Sanilac

Area
  - Total: 35.3 sq mi (91.5 km^{2})
  - Land: 35.3 sq mi (91.5 km^{2})
  - Water: 0 sq mi (0.0 km^{2})
- Elevation: 768 ft (234 m)

Population (2020)
  - Total: 893
  - Density: 25/sq mi (9.8/km^{2})
- Time zone: UTC-5 (Eastern (EST))
  - Summer (DST): UTC-4 (EDT)
- ZIP codes: 49419 (Carsonville), 48417 (Deckerville), 48471(Sandusky), 48472(Snover)
- FIPS code: 26-19460
- GNIS feature ID: 1626153

Custer Township is a civil township of Sanilac County in the U.S. state of Michigan. The population was 893 at the 2020 census.

== Communities ==
- Sandusky is a city on the southern boundary of the township at the junction of M-19 and M-46, but is administratively autonomous. The Sandusky ZIP code 48471 serves most of the township.

The postal delivery areas of some other nearby communities serve the township:

- Carsonville is a village to the southeast, and the Carsonville ZIP code 48419 serves a small area in the southeast corner of the township.
- Deckerville is a village to the northeast, and the Deckerville ZIP code 48427 serves and area in northeast part of the township.
- Snover is an unincorporated community to the west, and the Snover ZIP code 48472 serves a small area in the northwest corner of the township.

== Geography ==
According to the United States Census Bureau, the township has a total area of 35.3 square miles (91 km^{2}), of which 35.3 square miles (91 km^{2}) is land and 0.03% is water.

== Demographics ==
Historical population
Census	Pop.	Note	%±
2000	1,036		—
2010	1,006		−2.9%
2020	893		−11.2%

As of the census of 2000, there were 1,036 people, 404 households, and 300 families residing in the township. The population density was 29.3 inhabitants per square mile (11.3/km^{2}). There were 438 housing units at an average density of 12.4 per square mile (4.8/km^{2}). The racial makeup of the township was 97.10% White, 0.19% African American, 0.48% Native American, 0.29% Asian, 1.35% from other races, and 0.58% from two or more races. Hispanic or Latino of any race were 4.92% of the population.

There were 404 households, out of which 29.2% had children under the age of 18 living with them, 65.3% were married couples living together, 5.4% had a female householder with no husband present, and 25.5% were non-families. 23.0% of all households were made up of individuals, and 11.6% had someone living alone who was 65 years of age or older. The average household size was 2.50 and the average family size was 2.90.

In the township the population was spread out, with 23.0% under the age of 18, 6.9% from 18 to 24, 26.9% from 25 to 44, 25.5% from 45 to 64, and 17.7% who were 65 years of age or older. The median age was 41 years. For every 100 females, there were 96.2 males. For every 100 females age 18 and over, there were 97.0 males.

The median income for a household in the township was $35,000, and the median income for a family was $40,147. Males had a median income of $27,431 versus $21,908 for females. The per capita income for the township was $15,562. About 8.9% of families and 13.8% of the population were below the poverty line, including 22.6% of those under age 18 and 15.0% of those age 65 or over.
