= Watertown Township, Michigan =

Watertown Township, Michigan may refer to one of the following townships the U.S. state of Michigan:

- Watertown Charter Township, Michigan
- Watertown Township, Sanilac County, Michigan
- Watertown Township, Tuscola County, Michigan

== See also ==
- Watertown Township (disambiguation)
