= Grant Township, St. Clair County, Michigan =

Grant Township, Michigan
- Civil township
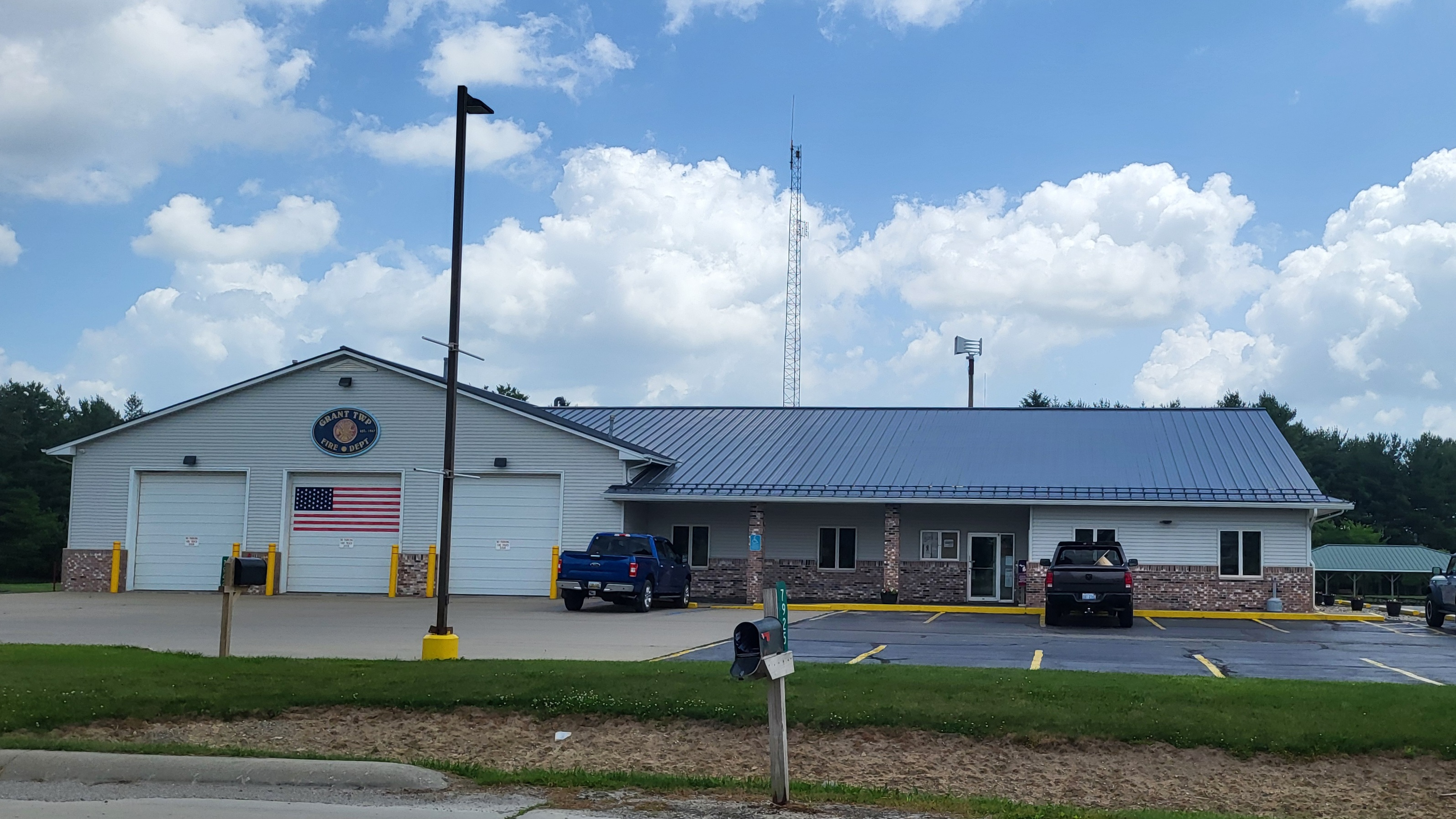
- Township fire department and offices

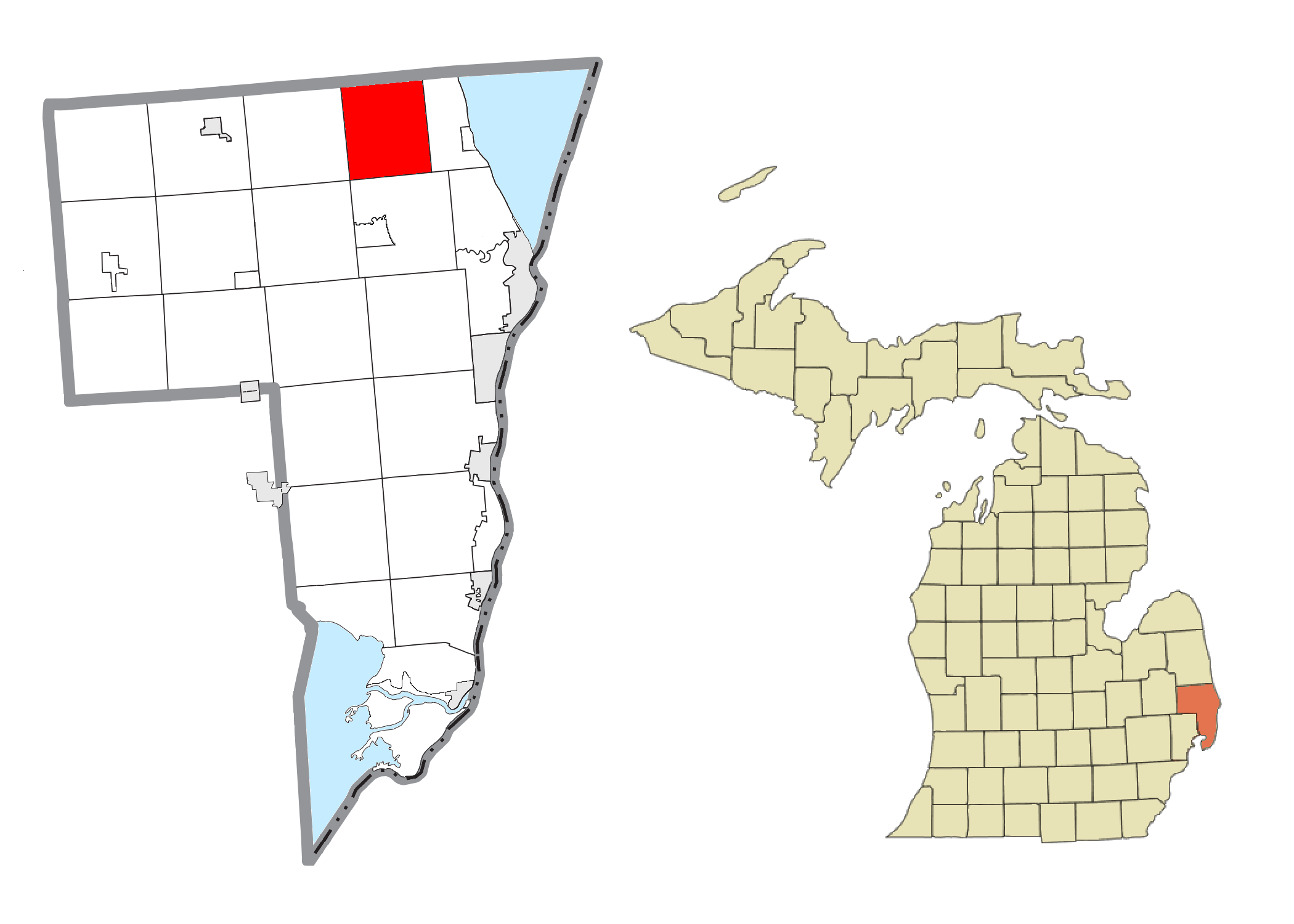
- Location within St. Clair County

- Location within the state of Michigan Location within the United States
- Coordinates: 43°07′32″N 82°35′46″W
- Country: United States
- State: Michigan
- County: St. Clair
- Established: 1866

Government
  - Supervisor: William Deater
  - Clerk: Nancy Sharum

Area
  - Total: 29.88 sq mi (77.39 km^{2})
  - Land: 29.67 sq mi (76.84 km^{2})
  - Water: 0.19 sq mi (0.49 km^{2})
- Elevation: 728 ft (222 m)

Population (2020)
  - Total: 1,829
  - Density: 61.6/sq mi (23.8/km^{2})
- Time zone: UTC-5 (Eastern (EST))
  - Summer (DST): UTC-4 (EDT)
- ZIP code(s): 48032 (Jeddo)
- Area code: 810
- FIPS code: 26-34420
- GNIS feature ID: 1626387
- Website: Official website

Grant Township is a civil township of St. Clair County in the U.S. state of Michigan. As of the 2020 Census, the township population was 1,829.

== Communities ==
- Blaine is an unincorporated community near the center of the township at 43°06′57″N 82°34′51″W. Thomas S. Knapp of Detroit made the first land purchase here in 1828 on which he built a sawmill. When Grant Township was organized in 1866, it was named for then General (and later U.S. president) Ulysses S Grant. The settlement became known as Grant Center, but because there was another post office with that name in Michigan at the time, it requested the name Blaine, after Republican U.S. Senator James G. Blaine. The post office operated from November 1879 until December 1960.
- Jeddo is an unincorporated community in the northern part of the township at 43°09′06″N 82°35′00″W. It was first known as Potter's Corners after brothers Arvin Stratton Potter and Nelson P. Potter (early settlers). It was given a post office named Pottersburg in February 1859. It was renamed Jeddo in July 1864. The Jeddo ZIP code serves all of Grant Township as well as portions of southern Fremont and Worth townships in Sanilac County and a small area in southwest Burtchville Township.

== Geography ==
According to the United States Census Bureau, the township has a total area of 29.8 square miles (77 km^{2}), all land.

== Demographics ==
As of the census of 2000, there were 1,667 people, 571 households, and 464 families residing in the township. The population density was 55.9 inhabitants per square mile (21.6/km^{2}). There were 606 housing units at an average density of 20.3 per square mile (7.8/km^{2}). The racial makeup of the township was 98.20% White, 0.12% African American, 0.12% Native American, 0.12% Asian, 0.72% from other races, and 0.72% from two or more races. Hispanic or Latino of any race were 2.10% of the population.

There were 571 households, out of which 41.9% had children under the age of 18 living with them, 67.6% were married couples living together, 8.6% had a female householder with no husband present, and 18.6% were non-families. 14.9% of all households were made up of individuals, and 4.7% had someone living alone who was 65 years of age or older. The average household size was 2.90 and the average family size was 3.18.

In the township the population was spread out, with 29.4% under the age of 18, 7.8% from 18 to 24, 32.5% from 25 to 44, 23.2% from 45 to 64, and 7.1% who were 65 years of age or older. The median age was 35 years. For every 100 females, there were 108.6 males. For every 100 females age 18 and over, there were 100.5 males.

The median income for a household in the township was $58,603, and the median income for a family was $62,885. Males had a median income of $45,667 versus $27,768 for females. The per capita income for the township was $20,729. About 2.9% of families and 4.2% of the population were below the poverty line, including 5.0% of those under age 18 and 3.4% of those age 65 or over.

== See also ==
Jeddo, Japan
