= Huronia Heights, Michigan =

- Unincorporated community
- Location within the state of Michigan Huronia Heights (the United States)
- Coordinates: 43°12′44″N 82°31′22″W
- Country: United States
- State: Michigan
- County: Sanilac
- Township: Worth
- Time zone: UTC-5 (Eastern (EST))
  - Summer (DST): UTC-4 (EDT)
- ZIP code(s): 15530 (48450)
- Area code: 810
- FIPS code: 26-37520
- GNIS feature ID: 628881

Huronia Heights is a resort town and unincorporated community in Worth Township, Michigan. It was established as a private resort in 1882 by Marcus Young. A post office operated from December 1886 until June 1901.

It is governed by a homeowner's association, which manages recreational and waste services, alongside setting speed limits. It is governed by a board of trustees, which is elected.
