= Maple Valley Township, Michigan =

Maple Valley Township is the name of some places in the U.S. state of Michigan:

- Maple Valley Township, Montcalm County, Michigan
- Maple Valley Township, Sanilac County, Michigan
