= Wheatland Township, Michigan =

Wheatland Township is the name of some places in the U.S. state of Michigan:

- Wheatland Township, Hillsdale County, Michigan
- Wheatland Township, Mecosta County, Michigan
- Wheatland Township, Sanilac County, Michigan
