= M-46 (Michigan highway) =

State highway in Michigan, United States

M-46
- M-46 highlighted in red

Route information
- Maintained by MDOT
- Length: 199.190 mi (320.565 km)
- Existed: c. July 1, 1919–present

Major junctions
- West end: Muskegon Avenue in Muskegon
- US 31 in Muskegon; US 131 through Cedar Springs–Howard City; US 127 near Alma and St. Louis; I-75 / US 23 east of Saginaw
- East end: M-25 in Port Sanilac

Location
- Country: United States
- State: Michigan
- Counties: Muskegon, Kent, Montcalm, Gratiot, Saginaw, Tuscola, Sanilac

Highway system
- Michigan State Trunkline Highway System; Interstate; US; State; Byways
← M-45	→ M-47

M-46 is an east–west state trunkline highway in the US state of Michigan between Muskegon and Port Sanilac, terminating near Lake Michigan and Lake Huron on each end. Except for the north–south segment that corresponds with the US Highway 131 (US 131) freeway between Cedar Springs and Howard City, M-46 is practically a due east–west surface highway. The road runs through rural sections of the Lower Peninsula connecting several freeways including US 31, US 131, US 127 and Interstate 75 (I-75).

The highway was formed by July 1, 1919, along two discontinuous sections of its current corridor. The gap was filled in by 1927, but a second break in the routing was created in the 1930s. This second interruption in the corridor was eliminated within a year. The various paths that M-46 has followed have been straightened over the intervening years, producing the modern corridor by the 1970s. Other changes have been made to the location of the western terminus in Muskegon, but it has remained fixed in its current location since 1984.

== Route description ==
M-46 is one of three trans-peninsular highways in the Lower Peninsula, starting blocks away from Lake Michigan in Muskegon and running almost to Lake Huron in Port Sanilac. The other two highways that do this are M-55 (Manistee – Tawas City) and M-72 (Empire–Harrisville). The highway is maintained by the Michigan Department of Transportation (MDOT) like all other state trunkline highways in the state. The department tracks the traffic volumes along all state highways as a part of its maintenance responsibilities using a metric called average annual daily traffic (AADT). This measurement is a calculation of the traffic level along a segment of roadway for any average day of the year. In 2009, MDOT figured that lowest traffic levels were the 1,855 vehicles used the highway daily near the eastern terminus. The peak traffic volumes were the 30,505 vehicles AADT along the section of M-46 immediately east of the US 31 freeway near Muskegon. The trunkline has been listed on the National Highway System (NHS) between the western terminus and US 31, and between Cedar Springs and the M-53 junction in Sanilac County. The NHS is a network of roadways important to the nation's economy, defense, and mobility.

=== Muskegon to Saginaw ===
M-46 starts at an intersection between Muskegon and Apple avenues near the downtown Muskegon business district. The highway follows Apple Avenue eastward through the edge of the district and through a residential area in Muskegon to an interchange with the US 31 freeway. On the other side of the freeway, Apple Avenue runs farther east, leaving the Muskegon area and passing through the rural woodlands of Muskegon County. Along the way, the road passes the Hall Drain, an artificial reservoir. At Casnovia, M-37 merges in from the north at a roundabout intersection, and the two highways run concurrently across the county line into Kent County, turning to the southeast. A few miles later in Kent City, M-46 turns due east again and leaves M-37 to run independently along 17 Mile Road. The highway runs through more mixed agricultural land to Cedar Springs, where M-46 turns north along the US 131 freeway.

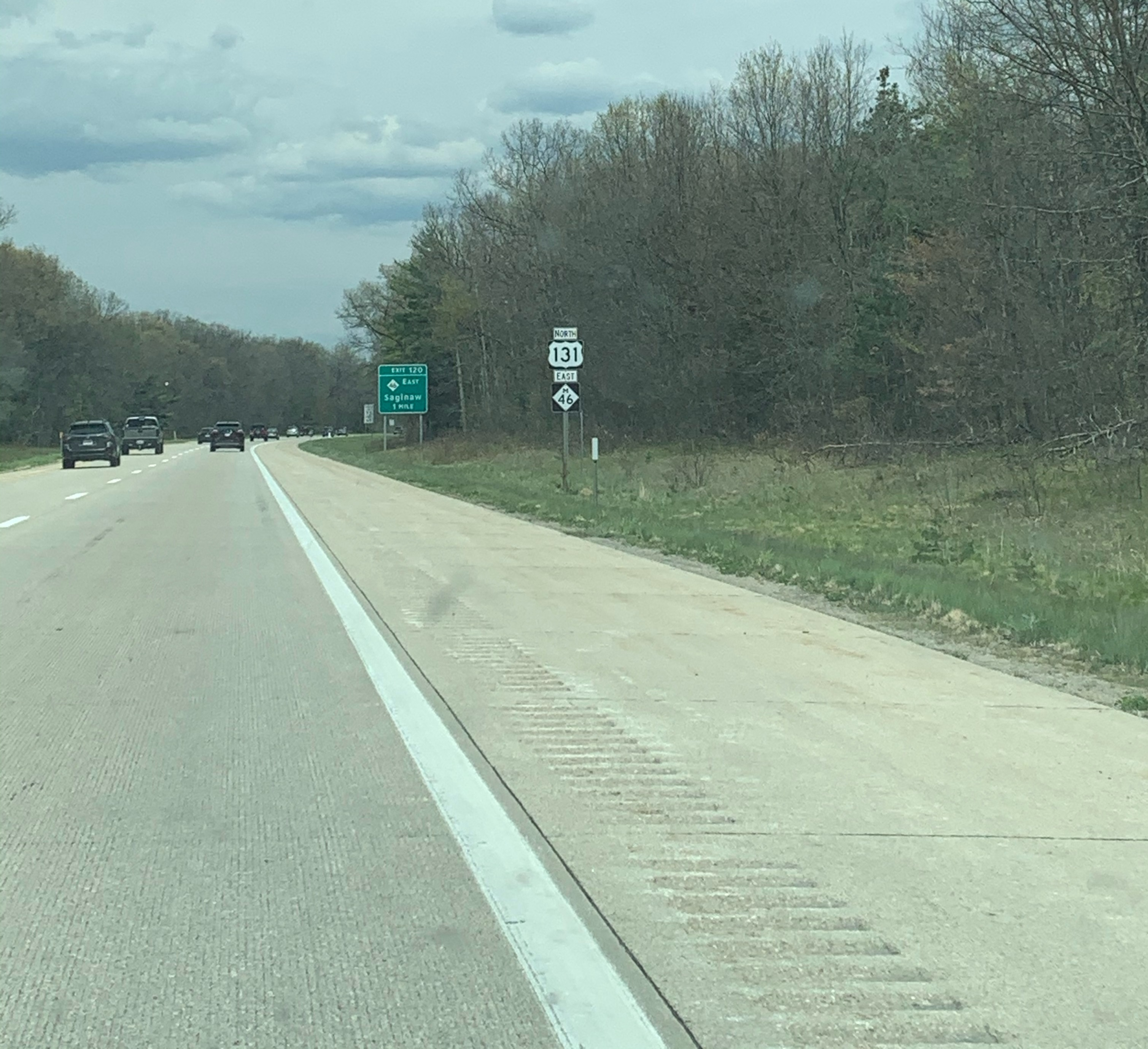
The concurrency of US 131 and M-46 as seen in Reynolds Township, Montcalm County

US 131/M-46 runs northwards through the northern Kent and western Montcalm counties for about 16 miles (26 km) near Sand Lake and Pierson. Near Howard City. M-46 leaves the freeway and turns eastward independently along Howard City – Edmore Road. The highway runs through the north side of Montcalm County connecting the communities of Lakeview and Edmore. Between Six Lakes and Edmore, M-66 runs along M-46, a distance of around 3.5 miles (5.6 km). The trunkline passes several small lakes and crosses the Maple River near Vestaburg before crossing into Gratiot County. The highway, now called Monroe Road crosses more farm fields as it approaches Alma. North of downtown, M-46 intersects the north–south leg of the Alma business loop before meeting the US 127 freeway. East of this freeway interchange, M-46 picks up the east–west leg of the US 127 business loop for St. Louis. Although similar, the separate business loop follows M-46 along Monroe Road over the Pine River to Main Street, where it turns south through downtown. M-46 continues eastward from town through farm fields to Breckenridge. At Meridian Road, the highway follows Gratiot Road into Saginaw County east through Merrill and Hemlock to the Saginaw area. East of Hemlock, M-46 meets the northern terminus of M-52 and then the southern terminus of M-47 in Saginaw Charter Township near its crossing of the Tittabawassee River.

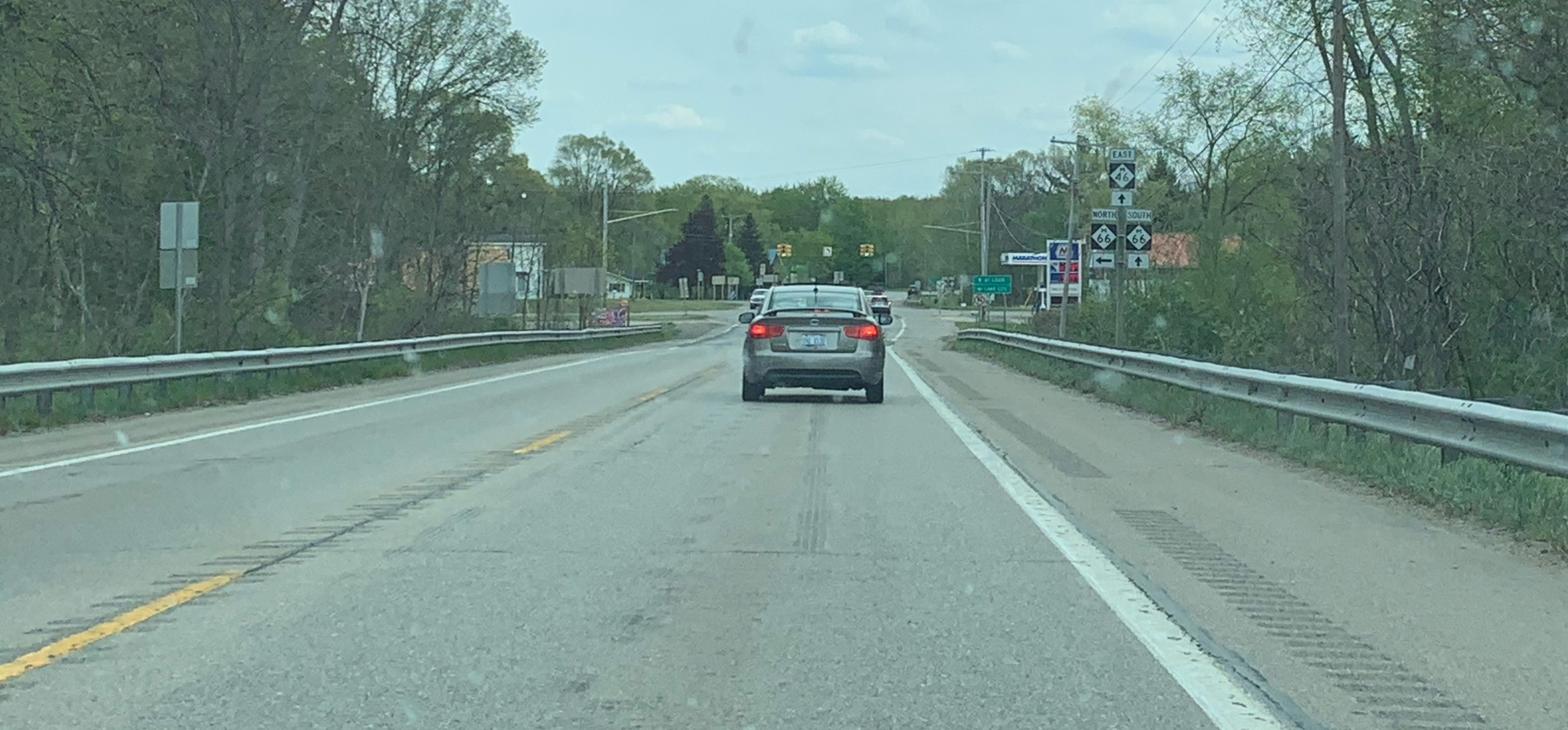
The junction of M-46 and M-66 in the community of Six Lakes

=== Saginaw to Port Sanilac ===
As M-46 enters Saginaw proper, it follows Gratiot Avenue past the Saginaw Country Club. The area around the club is filled with residential subdivisions as the roadway approaches the Saginaw River. M-46 follows Stephens Street southeasterly and Rust Avenue eastward to cross the river. The highway continues along Rust Avenue to Warren Avenue where it turns north. The highway then follows Holland Avenue, which is the continuation of Gratiot Avenue on the east side of the river. M-46 passes through an interchange with I-75/US 23 and leaves the Saginaw area. The highway continues eastward through rural Saginaw County into the region of the Lower Peninsula known as The Thumb. In Tuscola County, M-46 passes through the Vassar State Game Area and crosses the Cass River north of Vassar.

The area near the river east to the M-24 junction is forested. As M-46 approaches Kingston, farms dominate the landscape again. M-46 crosses into Sanilac County just west of the M-53 junction at Van Dyke Road. Between Elmer and Sandusky, M-19 follows M-46 for about 5 miles (8.0 km). The highway crosses the Black River near Carsonville. The eastern end of M-46 is in Port Sanilac, just blocks west of the city's marina on Lake Huron at an intersection with M-25.

== History ==
M-46 was designated by July 1, 1919, on a discontinuous route that ran between Howard City and Saginaw and between rural Tuscola County and Port Sanilac. The highway followed a different routing in place than it does today. The western terminus was in downtown Howard City, rather than north of town. The road ran farther south in Gratiot County so that it went into downtown Alma. By the end of 1927, the Michigan State Highway Department (MSHD) filled in the gap between Saginaw and Tuscola County, and the department extended the western end to Muskegon. M-46 followed the contemporary US 131 between Cedar Springs and Howard City and the modern routing west to Muskegon ending at US 31 downtown. In the middle of the 1930s, the section north of Howard City was straightened, removing the angled route between Amble and Howard City in favor of a more direct connection to US 131. The US 131 and M-37 concurrencies were removed, however, when the section between Kent City and Cedar Springs was removed from the highway system. That gap was eliminated in late 1936 when M-46 was routed down US 131 to Howard City and along M-82 to Newaygo. From there, it followed M-37 south to Casnovia. A new road was opened in early 1937 between Vestaburg and Alma, which was designated as part of M-46 by the end of the year. The western terminus was extended farther west through Muskegon to the outlet of Muskegon Lake on Lake Michigan as well. The M-82 concurrency was removed in 1938, and a more direct routing between Six Lakes and Edmore opened at the same time.

By the end of the 1950s, the routing through Muskegon was altered. Instead of terminating in the park at the outlet of Muskegon Lake into Lake Michigan, M-46 was routed to follow US 16 to the car ferry docks. The last section of gravel highway was also paved in Newaygo County near the Montcalm County line. The routing of M-46 between Casnovia and Howard City was altered in 1973 when the US 131 freeway was opened north of Cedar Springs by then-Congressman Gerald R. Ford. M-46 was restored to the Kent City–Cedar Springs roadway it used in the 1930s and routed concurrently along US 131 again. In the process, M-46 replaced a section of M-57 that had been designated along 17 Mile Road in late 1948 or early 1949. The last change to M-46's routing was made in the early 1980s. The extension through Muskegon to the car ferry docks was reversed, truncating the highway to its current terminus at then-Bus. US 31 in 1984. The business loop was shifted away from this location in 2007, leaving M-46 to terminate at a junction with a city street instead of another state highway.

== Major intersections ==
County	Location	mi	km	Exit	Destinations	Notes
Muskegon	Muskegon	0.000	0.000		Muskegon Avenue	Former route of Bus. US 31
Muskegon	Muskegon Township	2.211– 2.225	3.558– 3.581		US 31 – Ludington, Grand Haven, Holland	Exit 114 on US 31
Muskegon	Egelston Township	9.143	14.714		B-31 (Maple Island Road) – Brunswick, Nunica	
Muskegon	Moorland Township	15.185	24.438		B-35 (Ravenna Road) – Fremont, Ravenna	
Muskegon	Casnovia Township	22.104	35.573		M-37 north – Grant, Newaygo	Western end of M-37 concurrency; roundabout intersection
Kent	Kent City	24.563	39.530		M-37 south – Sparta, Grand Rapids	Eastern end of M-37 concurrency
Kent	Cedar Springs	34.167– 34.190	54.986– 55.023	104	US 131 south – Grand Rapids, Cedar Springs	Southern end of US 131 concurrency
Kent	Nelson Township	39.805	64.060	110	Sand Lake	
Montcalm	Pierson Township	43.43	69.89	114	Pierson	
Montcalm	Howard City	47.490	76.428	118	M-82 – Howard City, Newaygo	Eastern terminus of M-82
Montcalm	Reynolds Township	49.702	79.988	120	US 131 north – Big Rapids, Cadillac	Northern end of US 131 concurrency
Montcalm	Lakeview	61.179	98.458		M-91 south – Greenville	Northern terminus of M-91
Montcalm	Belvidere Township	66.977	107.789		M-66 north – Lake City	Western end of M-66 concurrency
Montcalm	Belvidere–Home township line	70.626	113.662		M-66 south – Ionia	Eastern end of M-66 concurrency
Gratiot	Pine River Township	91.722	147.612		Bus. US 127 – Downtown Alma	
Gratiot	Pine River Township	91.988– 92.019	148.040– 148.090		US 127 – Clare, Lansing Bus. US 127 south	Exit 127 on US 127; western end of Bus. US 127 (St. Louis) concurrency
Gratiot	St. Louis	94.721	152.439		Bus. US 127 (Main Street)	Northern end of Bus. US 127; eastern end of Bus. US 127 (St. Louis) concurrency
Gratiot–Saginaw county line	Wheeler–Jonesfield township line	105.749	170.187		M-30 north (Meridian Road) – West Branch	Southern terminus of M-30
Saginaw	Thomas Township	117.708	189.433		M-52 south – St. Charles, Owosso	Northern terminus of M-52
Saginaw	Saginaw Township	122.351	196.905		M-47 north (Midland Road) – Midland	Southern terminus of M-47
Saginaw	Saginaw	126.670	203.856		M-13 (Washington Avenue) – Bay City, Lansing	
Saginaw	Buena Vista Township	130.148– 130.160	209.453– 209.472		I-75 / US 23 – Flint, Mackinac Bridge	Exit 149 on I-75
Saginaw	Blumfield Township	137.989	222.072		M-83 – Frankenmuth, Bay City	
Tuscola	Richville	141.281	227.370		M-15 – Bay City, Vassar	
Tuscola	Indianfields–Fremont township line	155.815	250.760		M-24 – Caro, Mayville	
Sanilac	Lamotte–Marlette township line	170.751	274.797		M-53 – Bad Axe, Marlette	
Sanilac	Moore–Elmer township line	178.731	287.640		M-19 north – Bad Axe	Western end of M-19 concurrency
Sanilac	Sandusky	183.702	295.640		M-19 south – Peck, Yale	Eastern end of M-19 concurrency
Sanilac	Port Sanilac	199.190	320.565		M-25 / LHCT – Harbor Beach, Lexington, Port Huron	Eastern terminus of M-46
1.000 mi = 1.609 km; 1.000 km = 0.621 mi: Concurrency terminus
