= Elmer Township, Sanilac County, Michigan =

Elmer Township, Michigan
- Township
- Location within the state of Michigan Elmer Township, Michigan (the United States)
- Coordinates: 43°22′17″N 82°56′7″W
- Country: United States
- State: Michigan
- County: Sanilac

Area
  - Total: 36.3 sq mi (94.0 km^{2})
  - Land: 36.3 sq mi (94.0 km^{2})
  - Water: 0 sq mi (0.0 km^{2})
- Elevation: 791 ft (241 m)

Population (2020)
  - Total: 724
  - Density: 20/sq mi (7.7/km^{2})
- Time zone: UTC-5 (Eastern (EST))
  - Summer (DST): UTC-4 (EDT)
- ZIP codes: 48453 (Marlette, 48471 (Snover), 48472 (Sandusky)
- Area code: 810
- FIPS code: 26-25540
- GNIS feature ID: 1626232

Elmer Township is a civil township of Sanilac County in the U.S. state of Michigan. The population was 724 at the 2020 census.

== Communities ==
- Elmer is an unincorporated community at the junction of M-19 and M-46 along the northern boundary of the township with Moore Township at 43°25′11″N 82°55′45″W The first white settler in the area, Walter Hyslop, arrived in January 1866. The community was named after the township, which was organized in 1870. A post office operated from January 1876 until June 1906.
- Juhl is a historical settlement in the township at 43°21′35″N 82°56′47″W Juhl was founded in 1882 by Jens C. Juhl, a native of Denmark. It became a Danish community, with as many as a hundred families from Denmark living there. A post office operated from February 1889 until June 1906.
- Marlette is a city located to the southwest and the Marlette ZIP code 48453 serves the southern and western portions of the township.
- Sandusky is a city located to the northeast and the Sandusky ZIP code 48471 serves the northern and eastern portions of the township.
- Snover is an unincorporated community located to the north and the Snover ZIP code 48472 serves the northwest corner of Elmer Township.

== Geography ==
According to the United States Census Bureau, the township has a total area of 36.3 square miles (94 km^{2}), all land.

== Demographics ==
Historical population
Census	Pop.	Note	%±
2000	790		—
2010	806		2.0%
2020	724		−10.2%

As of the census of 2000, there were 790 people, 282 households, and 228 families residing in the township. The population density was 21.8 inhabitants per square mile (8.4/km^{2}). There were 308 housing units at an average density of 8.5 per square mile (3.3/km^{2}). The racial makeup of the township was 98.61% White, 0.13% Native American, 0.51% Asian, and 0.76% from two or more races. Hispanic or Latino of any race were 0.25% of the population.

There were 282 households, out of which 39.0% had children under the age of 18 living with them, 71.6% were married couples living together, 6.0% had a female householder with no husband present, and 18.8% were non-families. 17.0% of all households were made up of individuals, and 7.8% had someone living alone who was 65 years of age or older. The average household size was 2.79 and the average family size was 3.14.

In the township the population was spread out, with 27.6% under the age of 18, 7.2% from 18 to 24, 30.3% from 25 to 44, 20.1% from 45 to 64, and 14.8% who were 65 years of age or older. The median age was 38 years. For every 100 females, there were 102.0 males. For every 100 females age 18 and over, there were 102.1 males.

The median income for a household in the township was $41,563, and the median income for a family was $43,929. Males had a median income of $30,000 versus $22,250 for females. The per capita income for the township was $15,023. About 8.0% of families and 12.9% of the population were below the poverty line, including 19.2% of those under age 18 and 8.5% of those age 65 or over.
