= Austin Township, Sanilac County, Michigan =

Austin Township, Michigan
- Township
- Location within the state of Michigan Austin Township, Michigan (the United States)
- Coordinates: 43°38′33″N 82°56′52″W
- Country: United States
- State: Michigan
- County: Sanilac

Area
  - Total: 36.2 sq mi (93.8 km^{2})
  - Land: 36.2 sq mi (93.8 km^{2})
  - Water: 0 sq mi (0.0 km^{2})
- Elevation: 771 ft (235 m)

Population (2020)
  - Total: 619
  - Density: 17/sq mi (6.6/km^{2})
- Time zone: UTC-5 (Eastern (EST))
  - Summer (DST): UTC-4 (EDT)
- ZIP codes: 48472 (Snover); 48475 (Ubly)
- FIPS code: 26-04400
- GNIS feature ID: 1625868

Austin Township is a civil township of Sanilac County of the U.S. state of Michigan. As of the 2020 census, the township had a total population 619. The township was organized in 1851.

== Communities ==
- Austin Center is an unincorporated community near the center of the township at Cumber and M-19/Ubly Roads 43°37′21″N 82°56′15″W (Elevation: 791 ft./241 m.). A Mr. Watson was the first white settler in the area in 1854, soon joined by Alexander McRae, whose wife taught at the first school. A sawmill was built in 1868. The settlement was named after the township, which was first organized in 1851, but did not have its current boundaries until 1864. It was named for pioneer William Austin, who had settled in the county about 1844.
- Cumber is an unincorporated community in the western part of the Township at Cumber and Wheeler Roads 43°37′17″N 82°58′39″W (Elevation: 807 Ft./246 m.). T.M. Bradshaw opened a blacksmith shop in 1869. A post office was established in June 1874.
- Freidberger (or Freiburgers or Freiburger) is an unincorporated community in the central portion of the Township at Cumber and Freidberger Roads 43°37′24″N 82°55′03″W (Elevation: 787 ft./240 m.). A post office operated from July 1888 until June 1906. Once a stop on an early stagecoach route, it was later a stop on the Pere Marquette Railroad. The town declined greatly once the railroad stopped coming.
- Tyre is an unincorporated community in the northeast corner of the Township on Tyre Road at the Huron and Eastern Railway 43°40′30″N 82°53′28″W (Elevation: 781 ft./238 m.). Tyre was founded in 1857 by Alex Soule, John Getty and others. The Soule family named it after the Biblical Tyre because of the stony terrain. A post office operated from October 1863 until September 1881 and again from November 1881 until July 1964, one year after it was assigned zip code 48474. It was a station on the Pere Marquette Railway. At one time there were five general stores and seven doctors, three drug stores, and its large railroad station was a major agricultural shipping point for crops and livestock.

== Geography ==
According to the United States Census Bureau, the township has a total area of 36.2 square miles (94 km^{2}), all land.

== Demographics ==
As of the census of 2000, there were 673 people, 242 households, and 186 families residing in the township. The population density was 18.6 inhabitants per square mile (7.2/km^{2}). There were 298 housing units at an average density of 8.2 per square mile (3.2/km^{2}). The racial makeup of the township was 99.26% White, 0.15% African American, 0.45% Native American, and 0.15% from two or more races. Hispanic or Latino of any race were 0.45% of the population.

There were 242 households, out of which 32.2% had children under the age of 18 living with them, 64.9% were married couples living together, 7.0% had a female householder with no husband present, and 23.1% were non-families. 20.2% of all households were made up of individuals, and 8.7% had someone living alone who was 65 years of age or older. The average household size was 2.76 and the average family size was 3.21.

In the township the population was spread out, with 27.8% under the age of 18, 7.1% from 18 to 24, 27.8% from 25 to 44, 22.7% from 45 to 64, and 14.6% who were 65 years of age or older. The median age was 37 years. For every 100 females, there were 112.3 males. For every 100 females age 18 and over, there were 104.2 males.

The median income for a household in the township was $35,139, and the median income for a family was $38,594. Males had a median income of $27,708 versus $21,250 for females. The per capita income for the township was $15,041. About 9.4% of families and 11.1% of the population were below the poverty line, including 14.3% of those under age 18 and 21.4% of those age 65 or over.
