= Watertown Township, Sanilac County, Michigan =

Watertown Township, Michigan
- Township
- Location within the state of Michigan Watertown Township, Michigan (the United States)
- Coordinates: 43°22′22″N 82°49′4″W
- Country: United States
- State: Michigan
- County: Sanilac

Area
  - Total: 35.3 sq mi (91.3 km^{2})
  - Land: 35.3 sq mi (91.3 km^{2})
  - Water: 0 sq mi (0.0 km^{2})
- Elevation: 764 ft (233 m)

Population (2020)
  - Total: 1,263
  - Density: 35.8/sq mi (13.8/km^{2})
- Time zone: UTC-5 (Eastern (EST))
  - Summer (DST): UTC-4 (EDT)
- ZIP codes: 48401 (Applegate), 48419 (Carsonville), 48471 (Sandusky), 48466 (Peck)
- FIPS code: 26-84440
- GNIS feature ID: 1627222
- Website: https://watertowntownship.net/

Watertown Township is a civil township of Sanilac County in the U.S. state of Michigan. The population was 1,263 at the 2020 census.

== Communities ==
- Cash is a historic locale in the southern part of the township at 43°20′54″N 82°47′11″W. It was named for Edward Cash, who in 1851 became the first white settler in the area. The first meeting to organize Watertown Township was held in his home in 1868. David Fowles built a sawmill in 1882. A post office operated from June 1883 until February 1905.
- Sandusky is a city on the northern boundary of the township at the junction of M-19 and M-46, but is administratively autonomous. The Sandusky ZIP code 48471 serves most of the township except for parts in the southeast corner.
- Watertown is an unincorporated community in the southern part of the township on M-19 at 43°20′28″N 82°49′42″W. The first school was built here in 1867. John Gimmel built a sawmill in 1882 and William Tomelson opened the first store in 1883. A post office operated from January 1895 until February 1905.

The postal delivery areas of some other nearby communities serve the township:

- Applegate is a village to the southeast and the Applegate ZIP code 48401 serves an area in the southeast part of the township.
- Carsonville is a village to the northeast and the Carsonville ZIP code 48419 serves an area in the eastern part of the township.
- Peck is a village to the south and the Peck ZIP code 48466 serves a small area in the southern part of the township.

== Geography ==
According to the United States Census Bureau, the township has a total area of 35.2 square miles (91.3 km^{2}), all land.

== Demographics ==
As of the census of 2000, there were 1,376 people, 496 households, and 373 families residing in the township. The population density was 39.0 inhabitants per square mile (15.1/km^{2}). There were 523 housing units at an average density of 14.8 per square mile (5.7/km^{2}). The racial makeup of the township was 96.88% White, 0.36% African American, 0.44% Native American, 0.58% Asian, 0.73% from other races, and 1.02% from two or more races. Hispanic or Latino of any race were 2.18% of the population.

There were 496 households, out of which 37.3% had children under the age of 18 living with them, 66.9% were married couples living together, 5.2% had a female householder with no husband present, and 24.6% were non-families. 20.8% of all households were made up of individuals, and 8.7% had someone living alone who was 65 years of age or older. The average household size was 2.77 and the average family size was 3.23.

In the township the population was spread out, with 29.6% under the age of 18, 5.8% from 18 to 24, 27.9% from 25 to 44, 24.6% from 45 to 64, and 12.1% who were 65 years of age or older. The median age was 37 years. For every 100 females, there were 99.1 males. For every 100 females age 18 and over, there were 98.2 males.

The median income for a household in the township was $40,000, and the median income for a family was $45,667. Males had a median income of $32,115 versus $22,500 for females. The per capita income for the township was $17,145. About 7.1% of families and 9.7% of the population were below the poverty line, including 13.7% of those under age 18 and 11.6% of those age 65 or over.
