= Watertown Township =

Watertown Township may refer to the following places:

- Watertown Township, Clinton County, Michigan (Watertown Charter Township, Michigan)
- Watertown Township, Sanilac County, Michigan
- Watertown Township, Tuscola County, Michigan
- Watertown Township, Carver County, Minnesota
- Watertown Township, Washington County, Ohio

See also

- Watertown (disambiguation)
