= M-19 (Michigan highway) =

State highway in Michigan, United States

M-19
- M-19 highlighted in red

Route information
- Maintained by MDOT
- Length: 85.626 mi (137.802 km)
- Existed: c. July 1, 1919–present

Major junctions
- South end: I-94 near New Haven
- I-69 near Emmett; M-90 near Peck; M-46 in Sandusky
- North end: M-142 near Bad Axe

Location
- Country: United States
- State: Michigan
- Counties: Macomb, St. Clair, Sanilac, Huron

Highway system
- Michigan State Trunkline Highway System; Interstate; US; State; Byways
← M-18	→ M-20

M-19 is a north–south state trunkline highway in the US state of Michigan. The trunkline begins northeast of Detroit at a junction with Interstate 94 (I-94) near New Haven and runs northward to a junction with M-142 just east of Bad Axe in The Thumb region of the Lower Peninsula. The highway runs through mostly rural and agricultural areas, connecting several small communities.

Dating back to the original signposting of the state highway system, M-19 initially connected Detroit with Port Huron and Port Austin in 1919. In late 1926, the routing was altered to shorten it to Bad Axe on the north and Richmond on the south. Additional changes in the 1950s and 1960s updated the highway to finish paving the roadway and extend it southward to its present terminus.

== Route description ==
M-19 begins at a junction with I-94 near New Haven at the interchange for exit 247. The highway runs to the northwest along New Haven Road into town where it turns northeasterly on Gratiot Avenue to run parallel to I-94. Outside of New Haven, the landscape along the highway is composed of mostly farm fields on the way to Richmond. Once the trunkline enters that city, it turns northwesterly and then northward along Main Street before exiting town. Continuing north, M-19 travels through mostly rural areas and agricultural fields and continues as such, through the community of Memphis. The trunkline crosses out of Macomb County into St. Clair County in the middle of town. M-19 crosses the Belle River and continues to a junction with I-69 at exit 184, about 15 miles (24 km) west of Port Huron. From here the route continues north, passing through the small, rural community of Emmett, where M-19 crosses a branch line of the Canadian National Railway that also carries Amtrak's Blue Water passenger route.

North of Emmett, M-19 runs through farm fields at the base of The Thumb to Brockway, where it crosses Mill Creek and has a junction with M-136. North of Brockway the road jogs to the west passing east of the Yale Airport, a small grass landing strip just southeast of the city of Yale. The trunkline passes through Yale where it serves as Main Street in the small community. North of town, the surroundings open up into agricultural fields once again as the road continues its trek northward, crossing into Sanilac County. Across the county line, M-19 passes through small rural communities such as Peck and Speaker. About 26 miles (42 km) north of Yale, the road approaches the city of Sandusky, the county seat of Sanilac County. The road runs through residential areas into the center of town. Once downtown, the highway meets M-46; M-19 turns west, to follow M-46, running concurrently for about five miles (8.0 km).

After the two trunklines separate in Elmer, M-19 heads back northward as it enters rural and agricultural areas again. The highway heads due north for the next 30 miles (48 km) passing through Argyle. M-19 crosses into Huron County south of Ubly. In that community, the highway crosses a branch line of the Huron and Eastern Railway. At a junction northeast of the Huron County Memorial Airport, M-19 reaches its northern terminus at M-142 just east of the city of Bad Axe.

M-19 is maintained by MDOT like other state highways in Michigan. As a part of these maintenance responsibilities, the department tracks the volume of traffic that uses the roadways under its jurisdiction. These volumes are expressed using a metric called annual average daily traffic, which is a statistical calculation of the average daily number of vehicles on a segment of roadway. MDOT's surveys in 2010 showed that the highest traffic levels along M-19 were the 19,737 vehicles daily south in Richmond; the lowest counts were the 1,482 vehicles per day in Emmett. No section of M-19 has been listed on the National Highway System, a network of roads important to the country's economy, defense, and mobility.

== History ==
When the state's highway system was initially signed in 1919, M-19 was signposted from Detroit northeasterly to Port Huron before turning westward to run concurrently along M-21 and curving northerly to run to Bad Axe. From there it continued on to a terminus in Port Austin. When the United States Numbered Highway System was approved on November 11, 1926, the southernmost segment from Detroit to Port Huron was assigned to the then-new US Highway 25 (US 25). M-19 was removed from M-21 and realigned from Yale southward through Emmet to connect to US 25 in Richmond. The northern end was truncated to end to the east of Bad Axe.

In 1956, a realignment of M-90 shortened the concurrency of that highway with M-19. By the middle of 1960, the last 10-mile (16 km) segment of the highway was paved between Elmer and Argyle. When US 25 was moved to follow a completed segment of the I-94 freeway in 1963, M-19 was extended southerly along Gratiot Avenue from Richmond to New Haven and on to the freeway.

== Major intersections ==
County	Location	mi	km	Destinations	Notes
Macomb	Chesterfield Township	0.000– 0.222	0.000– 0.357	I-94 – Detroit, Port Huron	Exit 247 on I-94
St. Clair	Riley Township	19.771– 19.793	31.818– 31.854	I-69 – Flint, Port Huron	Exit 184 on I-69
St. Clair	Brockway Township	26.375	42.446	M-136 east – Fort Gratiot	
Sanilac	Speaker Township	39.425	63.448	M-90 west – Brown City, North Branch	Southern end of M-90 concurrency
Sanilac	Peck	42.314	68.098	M-90 east – Croswell, Lexington	Northern end of M-90 concurrency
Sanilac	Sandusky	54.084	87.040	M-46 east – Port Sanilac	Eastern end of M-46 concurrency
Sanilac	Moore Township	59.038	95.012	M-46 west – Saginaw	Western end of M-46 concurrency
Huron	Verona Township	85.626	137.802	M-142 – Bad Axe, Harbor Beach	
1.000 mi = 1.609 km; 1.000 km = 0.621 mi: Concurrency terminus
