= Marlette Township, Michigan =

City in US

- Township
- Location within the state of Michigan Marlette Township, Michigan (the United States)
- Coordinates: 43°21′1″N 83°3′18″W
- Country: United States
- State: Michigan
- County: Sanilac
- Township of Marlette: 1859

Government
  - Type: General Law Township

Area
  - Total: 52.5 sq mi (136.0 km^{2})
  - Land: 52.5 sq mi (136.0 km^{2})
  - Water: 0 sq mi (0.0 km^{2})
- Elevation: 804 ft (245 m)

Population (2020)
  - Total: 1,686
  - Density: 32/sq mi (12.4/km^{2})
- Time zone: UTC-5 (Eastern (EST))
  - Summer (DST): UTC-4 (EDT)
- ZIP codes: 48453 (Marlette), 48472 (Snover)
- Area code: 989
- FIPS code: 26-51840
- GNIS feature ID: 1626695
- Website: https://www.marlettetownship.org/

Marlette Township is a civil township of Sanilac County in the U.S. state of Michigan. The population was 1,686 at the 2020 census.

== History ==
Marlette was first settled in the 1850s by people from Ontario who sought tall timber and fertile soil. The community name was derived from a family of settlers, who carved their surname "Marlatt" on a log shanty. Marlette Township was created in 1859 from portions of Sanilac Township and Buel Township.

== Communities ==
- Germania was founded in 1873 by immigrants from the Saxony area of Germany who had initially come to work as miners but actually set up a farming community. It had a post office from 1878 until 1911.
- Marlette is a city located within the township, but has been administratively autonomous since it incorporated as a village in 1881. Marlette incorporated as a city in 1984. The Marlette ZIP code 48453 also serves all of Marlette Township, except for the northeast corner.
- Snover is an unincorporated community to the northeast and the Snover ZIP code 48472 serves the northeast corner of Marlette Township.

== Geography ==
According to the United States Census Bureau, the township has a total area of 52.5 square miles (136 km^{2}), all land.

== Demographics ==
Historical population
Census	Pop.	Note	%±
2000	2,051		—
2010	1,763		−14.0%
2020	1,686		−4.4%

As of the census of 2000, there were 2,051 people, 697 households, and 579 families residing in the township. The population density was 39.1 inhabitants per square mile (15.1/km^{2}). There were 743 housing units at an average density of 14.2 per square mile (5.5/km^{2}). The racial makeup of the township was 97.90% White, 0.15% African American, 0.20% Native American, 0.15% Asian, 0.73% from other races, and 0.88% from two or more races. Hispanic or Latino of any race were 1.90% of the population.

There were 697 households, out of which 39.3% had children under the age of 18 living with them, 73.3% were married couples living together, 6.7% had a female householder with no husband present, and 16.9% were non-families. 14.2% of all households were made up of individuals, and 6.9% had someone living alone who was 65 years of age or older. The average household size was 2.93 and the average family size was 3.22.

In the township the population was spread out, with 29.9% under the age of 18, 7.6% from 18 to 24, 26.6% from 25 to 44, 24.3% from 45 to 64, and 11.7% who were 65 years of age or older. The median age was 36 years. For every 100 females, there were 102.9 males. For every 100 females age 18 and over, there were 100.3 males.

The median income for a household in the township was $44,907, and the median income for a family was $50,114. Males had a median income of $30,884 versus $21,597 for females. The per capita income for the township was $17,556. About 10.1% of families and 14.7% of the population were below the poverty line, including 22.8% of those under age 18 and 8.5% of those age 65 or over.
