= Lamotte Township, Michigan =

- Township
- Location within the state of Michigan Lamotte Township, Michigan (the United States)
- Coordinates: 43°27′58″N 83°3′18″W
- Country: United States
- State: Michigan
- County: Sanilac

Area
  - Total: 35.5 sq mi (91.9 km^{2})
  - Land: 35.5 sq mi (91.9 km^{2})
  - Water: 0 sq mi (0.0 km^{2})
- Elevation: 768 ft (234 m)

Population (2020)
  - Total: 764
  - Density: 21.5/sq mi (8.31/km^{2})
- Time zone: UTC-5 (Eastern (EST))
  - Summer (DST): UTC-4 (EDT)
- FIPS code: 26-45460
- GNIS feature ID: 1626586

Lamotte Township is a civil township of Sanilac County in the U.S. state of Michigan. The population was 764 at the 2020 census.

== Communities ==
Two hamlets formed in Lamotte Township where railroad stations were located on the Detroit, Caro and Sandusky Railway Company. Before the state highway system lowered trucking costs to nearby competing railroads in the county, the DC&S allowed more efficient transport of agricultural products and other freight to and from Lamotte Township.

- Decker is an unincorporated community near the center of the township at 43°27′32″N 83°03′03″W. The village was named after the Decker family who were prominent in the region. The family also gave their name to the named village of Deckerville, which is also located in Sanilac County, about 15 miles to the east.
- Hemans is located about 3 miles west of Decker. Hemans is promoted as a tourist destination.

== Geography ==
According to the United States Census Bureau, the township has a total area of 35.5 square miles (92 km^{2}), all land.

== Demographics ==
At the 2000 census there were 981 people, 356 households, and 274 families in the township. The population density was 27.6 inhabitants per square mile (10.7/km^{2}). There were 384 housing units at an average density of 10.8 per square mile (4.2/km^{2}). The racial makeup of the township was 98.06% White, 0.61% from other races, and 1.33% from two or more races. Hispanic or Latino of any race were 2.04%.

Of the 356 households, 36.8% had children under the age of 18 living with them, 66.0% were married couples living together, 7.3% had a female householder with no husband present, and 23.0% were non-families. 19.4% of households were one person, and 7.9% were one person aged 65 or older. The average household size was 2.75 and the average family size was 3.16.

In the township the population was spread out, with 28.0% under the age of 18, 7.6% from 18 to 24, 28.8% from 25 to 44, 20.9% from 45 to 64, and 14.6% 65 or older. The median age was 36 years. For every 100 females, there were 101.0 males. For every 100 females age 18 and over, there were 102.3 males.

The median household income was $42,614 and the median family income was $46,563. Males had a median income of $33,333 versus $21,944 for females. The per capita income for the township was $18,651. About 8.8% of families and 9.0% of the population were below the poverty line, including 11.5% of those under age 18 and 12.8% of those age 65 or over.
