= Argyle Township, Michigan =

- Township
- Location within the state of Michigan Argyle Township, Michigan (the United States)
- Coordinates: 43°32′35″N 82°55′33″W
- Country: United States
- State: Michigan
- County: Sanilac

Area
  - Total: 36.3 sq mi (94.1 km^{2})
  - Land: 36.3 sq mi (94.1 km^{2})
  - Water: 0 sq mi (0.0 km^{2})
- Elevation: 791 ft (241 m)

Population (2020)
  - Total: 687
  - Density: 18.9/sq mi (7.30/km^{2})
- Time zone: UTC-5 (Eastern (EST))
  - Summer (DST): UTC-4 (EDT)
- ZIP codes: 48410 (P.O. Box only), 48472 (Snover), 48475 (Ubly)
- Area code: 810
- FIPS code: 26-03460
- GNIS feature ID: 1625848

Argyle Township is a civil township of Sanilac County in the U.S. state of Michigan. As of the 2020 census, the township population was 687. Argyle Township was organized in 1872.

== Communities ==
- Argyle is an unincorporated community in the township at M-19/Ubly Road and Argyle Road 43°33′51″N 82°56′10″W. The Argyle ZIP code 48410 provides P.O. Box only service. The first settlers were mostly Scots from Ontario, Canada and they named the township and settlement after Argyle, Scotland when it was organized in 1872. A post office was established in February 1876.
- Laing is a historical settlement at M-19/Ubly Road and Deckerville Road at 43°31′14″N 82°56′02″W (Elevation: 768 ft./234 m.). A rural post office named for Herman Laing operated from January 1896 until Jun 1906.

== Geography ==
According to the United States Census Bureau, the township has a total area of 36.3 square miles (94 km^{2}), of which 36.3 square miles (94 km^{2}) is land and 0.03% is water.

== History ==
Jacob Sitter (modern "Seder") was the first recognized permanent settler in Argyle Township. On 1 July 1861 Jacob purchased 320 acres in Argyle Township (from the state of Michigan), on which he first built a two-story barn for his livestock (first story) and his family (second story).

== Demographics ==
As of the census of 2000, there were 770 people, 275 households, and 213 families residing in the township. The population density was 21.2 inhabitants per square mile (8.2/km^{2}). There were 326 housing units at an average density of 9.0 per square mile (3.5/km^{2}). The racial makeup of the township was 97.7% White, 0.4% Native American, 0.3% from other races, and 1.7% from two or more races. Hispanic or Latino of any race were 0.8% of the population.

There were 275 households, out of which 34.5% had children under the age of 18 living with them, 62.9% were married couples living together, 10.9% had a female householder with no husband present, and 22.5% were non-families. 19.6% of all households were made up of individuals, and 10.5% had someone living alone who was 65 years of age or older. The average household size was 2.80 and the average family size was 3.24.

In the township the population was spread out, with 27.1% under the age of 18, 9.4% from 18 to 24, 26.4% from 25 to 44, 26.1% from 45 to 64, and 11.0% who were 65 years of age or older. The median age was 36 years. For every 100 females, there were 102.6 males. For every 100 females age 18 and over, there were 101.8 males.

The median income for a household in the township was $35,341, and the median income for a family was $43,125. Males had a median income of $30,400 versus $21,094 for females. The per capita income for the township was $17,012. About 4.2% of families and 7.5% of the population were below the poverty line, including 9.0% of those under age 18 and 14.3% of those age 65 or over.
