= Worth Township, Michigan =

- Township
- Location within the state of Michigan Worth Township, Michigan (the United States)
- Coordinates: 43°12′49″N 82°32′11″W
- Country: United States
- State: Michigan
- County: Sanilac

Area
  - Total: 38.8 sq mi (100.4 km^{2})
  - Land: 38.8 sq mi (100.4 km^{2})
  - Water: 0.039 sq mi (0.1 km^{2})
- Elevation: 720 ft (220 m)

Population (2020)
  - Total: 3,455
  - Density: 89/sq mi (34.4/km^{2})
- Time zone: UTC-5 (Eastern (EST))
  - Summer (DST): UTC-4 (EDT)
- ZIP codes: 48032 (Jeddo); 48450 (Lexington); 48422 (Croswell)
- FIPS code: 26-88760
- GNIS feature ID: 1627291
- Website: https://worthtownshipmi.gov/

A water tower in Worth Township, Michigan

Worth Township is a civil township of Sanilac County in the U.S. state of Michigan. The population was 3,455 at the 2020 census.

== Communities ==
- Amadore is a historic locale in the township at 43°11′42″N 82°35′09″W. It was named for pioneer settler Amadore Fuller. A post office operated from June 1868 until October 1873 and from December 1873 until January 1943. It was a station on a branch of the Pere Marquette Railroad and was also called "Galbraith's Corners.

There are also a number of unincorporated resort communities along the shores of Lake Huron:

- Birch Beach is an unincorporated community in the township at 43°12′07″N 82°30′45″W. It was first called "Stevens' Landing" and had a post office with that name from January 1856 until January 1860 and from February 1863 until August 1868. The settlement was renamed Birch Beach and a post office with that name operated from May 1927 until September 1934.
- Blue Water Beach is an unincorporated community in the township at 43°12′26″N 82°30′56″W.
- Great Lakes Beach is an unincorporated community in the township at 43°13′01″N 82°31′20″W.
- Huronia Heights is an unincorporated community in the township at 43°12′44″N 82°31′22″W. It was founded as a private resort in 1882 by Marcus Young. A post office operated from December 1886 until June 1901.
- Lexington Heights is an unincorporated community in the township at 43°13′30″N 82°31′29″W.

== Geography ==
According to the United States Census Bureau, the township has a total area of 38.8 square miles (100 km^{2}), of which 38.8 square miles (100 km^{2}) is land and 0.04 square miles (0.10 km^{2}) (0.05%) is water.

== Demographics ==
Historical population
Census	Pop.	Note	%±
2000	4,021		—
2010	3,894		−3.2%
2020	3,455		−11.3%

As of the census of 2000, there were 4,021 people, 1,619 households, and 1,143 families residing in the township. The population density was 103.8 inhabitants per square mile (40.1/km^{2}). There were 2,778 housing units at an average density of 71.7 per square mile (27.7/km^{2}). The racial makeup of the township was 97.56% White, 0.15% African American, 0.40% Native American, 0.07% Asian, 0.07% Pacific Islander, 0.70% from other races, and 1.04% from two or more races. Hispanic or Latino of any race were 2.06% of the population.

There were 1,619 households, out of which 29.2% had children under the age of 18 living with them, 59.7% were married couples living together, 8.0% had a female householder with no husband present, and 29.4% were non-families. 25.4% of all households were made up of individuals, and 12.2% had someone living alone who was 65 years of age or older. The average household size was 2.48 and the average family size was 2.97.

In the township the population was spread out, with 24.4% under the age of 18, 6.4% from 18 to 24, 27.0% from 25 to 44, 25.4% from 45 to 64, and 16.9% who were 65 years of age or older. The median age was 40 years. For every 100 females, there were 100.1 males. For every 100 females age 18 and over, there were 95.4 males.

The median income for a household in the township was $37,129, and the median income for a family was $41,600. Males had a median income of $35,978 versus $23,365 for females. The per capita income for the township was $18,955. About 8.8% of families and 12.2% of the population were below the poverty line, including 18.8% of those under age 18 and 6.6% of those age 65 or over.
