= Maple Valley Township, Sanilac County, Michigan =

Maple Valley Township, Michigan
- Township
- Location within the state of Michigan Maple Valley Township, Michigan (the United States)
- Coordinates: 43°11′35″N 82°56′2″W
- Country: United States
- State: Michigan
- County: Sanilac

Area
  - Total: 34.5 sq mi (89.4 km^{2})
  - Land: 34.5 sq mi (89.4 km^{2})
  - Water: 0 sq mi (0.0 km^{2})
- Elevation: 794 ft (242 m)

Population (2020)
  - Total: 1,178
  - Density: 34/sq mi (13.2/km^{2})
- Time zone: UTC-5 (Eastern (EST))
  - Summer (DST): UTC-4 (EDT)
- FIPS code: 26-51380
- GNIS feature ID: 1626681

Maple Valley Township is a civil township of Sanilac County in the U.S. state of Michigan. The population was 1,178 at the 2020 census.

== Communities ==
- Valley Center is an unincorporated community in the township at Shephard and Galbraith Line roads (43°11′06″N 82°55′07″W at an elevation of 801 ft (244 m)).

== Geography ==
According to the United States Census Bureau, the township has a total area of 34.5 square miles (89.4 km^{2}), all land.

== Demographics ==
Historical population
Census	Pop.	Note	%±
2000	1,114		—
2010	1,221		9.6%
2020	1,178		−3.5%

As of the census of 2000, there were 1,114 people, 378 households, and 306 families residing in the township. The population density was 32.3 inhabitants per square mile (12.5/km^{2}). There were 405 housing units at an average density of 11.7 per square mile (4.5/km^{2}). The racial makeup of the township was 98.92% White, 0.09% African American, 0.18% Native American, 0.18% Asian, 0.09% from other races, and 0.54% from two or more races. Hispanic or Latino of any race were 2.33% of the population.

There were 378 households, out of which 39.4% had children under the age of 18 living with them, 70.4% were married couples living together, 6.3% had a female householder with no husband present, and 18.8% were non-families. 16.4% of all households were made up of individuals, and 6.9% had someone living alone who was 65 years of age or older. The average household size was 2.95 and the average family size was 3.27.

In the township the population was spread out, with 31.3% under the age of 18, 6.8% from 18 to 24, 29.6% from 25 to 44, 21.6% from 45 to 64, and 10.6% who were 65 years of age or older. The median age was 36 years. For every 100 females, there were 107.8 males. For every 100 females age 18 and over, there were 105.1 males.

The median income for a household in the township was $41,058, and the median income for a family was $43,452. Males had a median income of $33,750 versus $22,143 for females. The per capita income for the township was $16,418. About 7.0% of families and 10.1% of the population were below the poverty line, including 13.4% of those under age 18 and 8.7% of those age 65 or over.
