= Speaker Township, Michigan =

- Township
- Location within the state of Michigan Speaker Township, Michigan (the United States)
- Coordinates: 43°11′53″N 82°49′32″W
- Country: United States
- State: Michigan
- County: Sanilac

Area
  - Total: 34.6 sq mi (89.6 km^{2})
  - Land: 34.6 sq mi (89.6 km^{2})
  - Water: 0 sq mi (0.0 km^{2})
- Elevation: 814 ft (248 m)

Population (2020)
  - Total: 1,343
  - Density: 38.8/sq mi (15.0/km^{2})
- Time zone: UTC-5 (Eastern (EST))
  - Summer (DST): UTC-4 (EDT)
- FIPS code: 26-75500
- GNIS feature ID: 1627104
- Website: https://speakertwpmi.gov/

Speaker Township is a civil township of Sanilac County in the U.S. state of Michigan. The population was 1,343 at the 2020 census.

== Geography ==
According to the United States Census Bureau, the township has a total area of 34.6 square miles (90 km^{2}), all land.

== Demographics ==
As of the census of 2000, there were 1,408 people, 501 households, and 390 families residing in the township. The population density was 40.7 inhabitants per square mile (15.7/km^{2}). There were 546 housing units at an average density of 15.8 per square mile (6.1/km^{2}). The racial makeup of the township was 97.02% White, 0.21% African American, 0.64% Native American, 0.14% Asian, 0.57% from other races, and 1.42% from two or more races. Hispanic or Latino of any race were 1.14% of the population.

There were 501 households, out of which 36.3% had children under the age of 18 living with them, 66.5% were married couples living together, 5.2% had a female householder with no husband present, and 22.0% were non-families. 18.6% of all households were made up of individuals, and 7.6% had someone living alone who was 65 years of age or older. The average household size was 2.81 and the average family size was 3.22.

In the township the population was spread out, with 29.2% under the age of 18, 6.8% from 18 to 24, 30.6% from 25 to 44, 21.4% from 45 to 64, and 11.9% who were 65 years of age or older. The median age was 35 years. For every 100 females, there were 109.5 males. For every 100 females age 18 and over, there were 106.8 males.

The median income for a household in the township was $41,250, and the median income for a family was $50,625. Males had a median income of $34,792 versus $21,875 for females. The per capita income for the township was $17,583. About 4.9% of families and 6.5% of the population were below the poverty line, including 5.4% of those under age 18 and 11.0% of those age 65 or over.
