= Marion Township, Sanilac County, Michigan =

Marion Township, Michigan
- Township
- Location within the state of Michigan Marion Township, Michigan (the United States)
- Coordinates: 43°33′16″N 82°42′22″W
- Country: United States
- State: Michigan
- County: Sanilac

Area
  - Total: 36.1 sq mi (93.6 km^{2})
  - Land: 36.1 sq mi (93.6 km^{2})
  - Water: 0 sq mi (0.0 km^{2})
- Elevation: 784 ft (239 m)

Population (2020)
  - Total: 1,578
  - Density: 44/sq mi (16.9/km^{2})
- Time zone: UTC-5 (Eastern (EST))
  - Summer (DST): UTC-4 (EDT)
- FIPS code: 26-51720
- GNIS feature ID: 1626692

Marion Township is a civil township of Sanilac County in the U.S. state of Michigan. The population was 1,578 at the 2020 census.

== Communities ==
- Richmondville was the site of a post office from June 1, 1860, until June 30, 1906. The community is located off M-25 on the Lake Huron shoreline.

== Geography ==
According to the United States Census Bureau, the township has a total area of 36.1 square miles (93 km^{2}), all land.

== Demographics ==
Historical population
Census	Pop.	Note	%±
2000	1,820		—
2010	1,659		−8.8%
2020	1,578		−4.9%

As of the census of 2020, there were 1,578 people and 658 households in the township. The population density was 49.9 inhabitants per square mile (19.3/km^{2}). There were 750 housing units at an average density of 20.8 per square mile (8.0/km^{2}). The racial makeup of the township was 95.34% White, 0.17% African American, 0.33% Native American, 0.50% Asian, 2.50% from other races, and 1.16% from two or more races. Hispanic or Latino of any race were 5.66% of the population.

There were 684 households, out of which 30.6% had children under the age of 18 living with them, 56.0% were married couples living together, 9.9% had a female householder with no husband present, and 31.6% were non-families. 26.9% of all households were made up of individuals, and 12.0% had someone living alone who was 65 years of age or older. The average household size was 2.51 and the average family size was 3.03.

In the township the population was spread out, with 25.1% under the age of 18, 8.4% from 18 to 24, 25.4% from 25 to 44, 23.2% from 45 to 64, and 17.9% who were 65 years of age or older. The median age was 39 years. For every 100 females, there were 90.2 males. For every 100 females age 18 and over, there were 87.6 males.

The median income for a household in the township was $34,803, and the median income for a family was $41,739. Males had a median income of $30,600 versus $21,014 for females. The per capita income for the township was $17,964. About 7.2% of families and 11.5% of the population were below the poverty line, including 16.9% of those under age 18 and 9.8% of those age 65 or over.
