= Fremont Township, Sanilac County, Michigan =

Fremont Township, Michigan
- Township
- Location within the state of Michigan Fremont Township, Michigan (the United States)
- Coordinates: 43°11′53″N 82°42′52″W
- Country: United States
- State: Michigan
- County: Sanilac

Area
  - Total: 35.0 sq mi (90.7 km^{2})
  - Land: 35.0 sq mi (90.7 km^{2})
  - Water: 0.039 sq mi (0.1 km^{2})
- Elevation: 750 ft (230 m)

Population (2020)
  - Total: 958
  - Density: 27.4/sq mi (10.6/km^{2})
- Time zone: UTC-5 (Eastern (EST))
  - Summer (DST): UTC-4 (EDT)
- FIPS code: 26-30740
- GNIS feature ID: 1626319

Fremont Township is a civil township of Sanilac County in the U.S. state of Michigan. As of the 2020 census, the township population was 958.

== Communities ==
East Fremont was the name of a rural post office in the township from 1874 until 1906.

== Geography ==
According to the United States Census Bureau, the township has a total area of 35.0 square miles (91 km^{2}), of which 35.0 square miles (91 km^{2}) is land and 0.04 square miles (0.10 km^{2}) (0.09%) is water.

== Demographics ==
As of the census of 2000, there were 913 people, 313 households, and 256 families residing in the township. The population density was 26.1 inhabitants per square mile (10.1/km^{2}). There were 352 housing units at an average density of 10.1 per square mile (3.9/km^{2}). The racial makeup of the township was 97.59% White, 0.44% African American, 1.10% Native American, 0.22% from other races, and 0.66% from two or more races. Hispanic or Latino of any race were 0.55% of the population.

There were 313 households, out of which 39.3% had children under the age of 18 living with them, 74.4% were married couples living together, 4.5% had a female householder with no husband present, and 18.2% were non-families. 14.7% of all households were made up of individuals, and 6.4% had someone living alone who was 65 years of age or older. The average household size was 2.92 and the average family size was 3.25.

In the township the population was spread out, with 29.5% under the age of 18, 6.4% from 18 to 24, 29.6% from 25 to 44, 25.6% from 45 to 64, and 9.0% who were 65 years of age or older. The median age was 36 years. For every 100 females, there were 108.9 males. For every 100 females age 18 and over, there were 106.4 males.

The median income for a household in the township was $44,250, and the median income for a family was $47,500. Males had a median income of $37,583 versus $20,625 for females. The per capita income for the township was $15,934. About 6.5% of families and 10.0% of the population were below the poverty line, including 13.0% of those under age 18 and none of those age 65 or over.
