= Carsonville, Michigan =

- Village
- Location of Carsonville, Michigan
- Coordinates: 43°25′32″N 82°40′26″W
- Country: United States
- State: Michigan
- County: Sanilac

Area
  - Total: 1.16 sq mi (3.00 km^{2})
  - Land: 1.16 sq mi (3.00 km^{2})
  - Water: 0 sq mi (0.00 km^{2})
- Elevation: 810 ft (247 m)

Population (2020)
  - Total: 465
  - Density: 401.7/sq mi (155.09/km^{2})
- Time zone: UTC-5 (Eastern (EST))
  - Summer (DST): UTC-4 (EDT)
- ZIP code: 48419
- Area code: 810
- FIPS code: 26-13620
- GNIS feature ID: 0622798

Carsonville is a village in Sanilac County of the U.S. state of Michigan. As of the 2020 census, Carsonville had a population of 465. The village is situated at 43°25′37″N 82°40′17″W on the boundary between Bridgehampton Township and Washington Township, with about half the village in each.

The village began with a store built in 1853 operated by Silas C. Hall, who also became the first postmaster in 1857. The place was initially called Hall's Corners. It was renamed in 1884 after local store-owner and businessman Arthur Carson, who built his first store there in 1864. The village incorporated in 1887.

== Geography ==
According to the United States Census Bureau, the village has a total area of 1.13 square miles (2.93 km^{2}), all land.

== Demographics ==
Historical population
Census	Pop.	Note	%±
1900	400		—
1910	401		0.3%
1920	536		33.7%
1930	444		−17.2%
1940	433		−2.5%
1950	487		12.5%
1960	502		3.1%
1970	621		23.7%
1980	622		0.2%
1990	583		−6.3%
2000	502		−13.9%
2010	527		5.0%
2020	465		−11.8%
U.S. Decennial Census

=== 2010 census ===
As of the census of 2010, there were 527 people, 195 households, and 134 families living in the village. The population density was 466.4 inhabitants per square mile (180.1/km^{2}). There were 224 housing units at an average density of 198.2 per square mile (76.5/km^{2}). The racial makeup of the village was 94.7% White, 0.2% African American, 0.2% Native American, 0.6% Asian, 1.1% from other races, and 3.2% from two or more races. Hispanic or Latino of any race were 4.7% of the population.

There were 195 households, of which 40.0% had children under the age of 18 living with them, 46.7% were married couples living together, 15.9% had a female householder with no husband present, 6.2% had a male householder with no wife present, and 31.3% were non-families. 24.1% of all households were made up of individuals, and 10.8% had someone living alone who was 65 years of age or older. The average household size was 2.67 and the average family size was 3.05.

The median age in the village was 35.6 years. 28.7% of residents were under the age of 18; 9.6% were between the ages of 18 and 24; 24.1% were from 25 to 44; 27.4% were from 45 to 64; and 10.2% were 65 years of age or older. The gender makeup of the village was 46.3% male and 53.7% female.

=== 2000 census ===
As of the census of 2000, there were 502 people, 192 households, and 149 families living in the village. The population density was 443.1 inhabitants per square mile (171.1/km^{2}). There were 211 housing units at an average density of 186.2 per square mile (71.9/km^{2}). The racial makeup of the village was 98.41% White, 0.20% African American, 0.20% Native American, 0.20% from other races, and 1.00% from two or more races. Hispanic or Latino of any race were 1.59% of the population.

There were 192 households, out of which 37.0% had children under the age of 18 living with them, 57.3% were married couples living together, 14.1% had a female householder with no husband present, and 21.9% were non-families. 18.2% of all households were made up of individuals, and 7.3% had someone living alone who was 65 years of age or older. The average household size was 2.61 and the average family size was 2.99.

In the village, the population was spread out, with 26.9% under the age of 18, 10.8% from 18 to 24, 24.5% from 25 to 44, 24.7% from 45 to 64, and 13.1% who were 65 years of age or older. The median age was 37 years. For every 100 females, there were 98.4 males. For every 100 females age 18 and over, there were 90.2 males.

The median income for a household in the village was $25,795, and the median income for a family was $37,679. Males had a median income of $26,389 versus $20,714 for females. The per capita income for the village was $13,304. About 13.3% of families and 15.2% of the population were below the poverty line, including 25.5% of those under age 18 and 5.5% of those age 65 or over.

== Education ==
- Carsonville-Port Sanilac Schools has a combined high school and middle school off M-46 east of Carsonville. The elementary school is located within the village limits on M-46 (Chandler Street).

== Transportation ==
- M-46 passes through Carsonville going east and west.
- Local freight rail service is provided by shortline Huron and Eastern Railway (HESR).
