= Sanilac County, Michigan =

County in Michigan, United States

- County
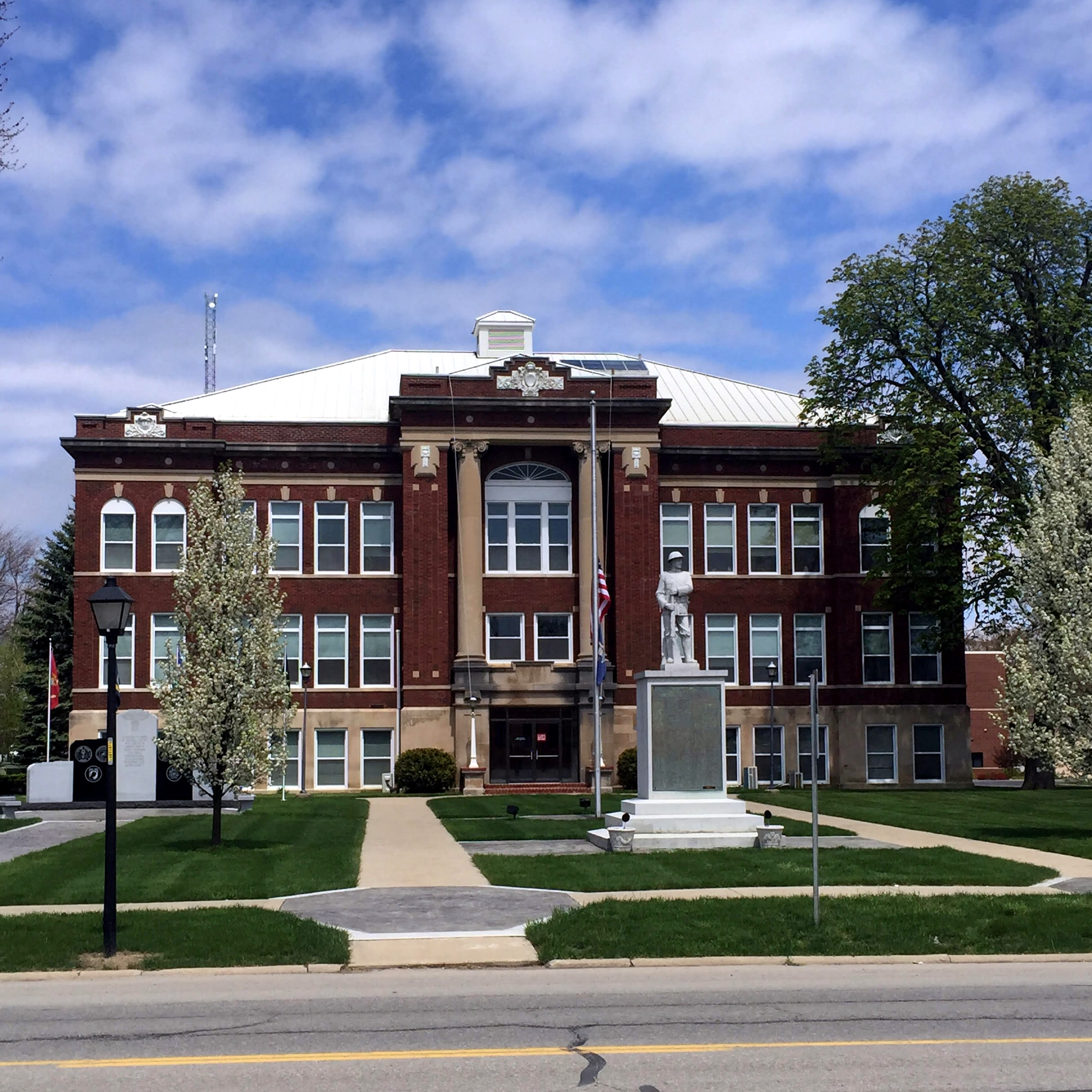
- Sanilac County Courthouse

- Flag Seal

- Location within the U.S. state of Michigan
- Coordinates: 43°28′N 82°38′W
- Country: United States
- State: Michigan
- Founded: September 10, 1822 (created); December 31, 1849 (organized)
- Seat: Sandusky
- Largest city: Sandusky

Area
  - Total: 1,590 sq mi (4,100 km^{2})
  - Land: 963 sq mi (2,490 km^{2})
  - Water: 627 sq mi (1,620 km^{2}) 39%

Population (2020)
  - Total: 40,611
  - Estimate (2025): 40,038 ▼
  - Density: 41.8/sq mi (16.1/km^{2})
- Time zone: UTC−5 (Eastern)
  - Summer (DST): UTC−4 (EDT)
- Congressional district: 9th
- Website: www.sanilaccounty.gov

Sanilac County (/sænəlæk/ SAN-ə-lack) is a county located in the Thumb region of the U.S. state of Michigan. As of the 2020 Census, the population was 40,611. The county seat is Sandusky. The county was created on September 10, 1822, and was fully organized on December 31, 1849. Sanilac County is considered to be part of the Thumb of Michigan, a subregion of the Flint/Tri-Cities. Sanilac County enjoys seasonal tourism in towns such as Lexington, Port Sanilac, and Carsonville. Sanilac County is economically attached to St. Clair County and Huron County and is largely composed of nearly flat areas of rich soil.

== History ==
Map of the Surveyed Part of the Territory of Michigan by Orange Risdon, 1825, showing an earlier, larger incarnation of Sanilac County, most of which had not yet been surveyed.

Sanilac County was probably named for a Wyandot (Huron) chief named Sanilac. (See List of Michigan county name etymologies). The county was formed on September 10, 1822, by the Michigan Territorial Legislature, partitioning parts of St. Clair County and unorganized territory administered by Oakland County. The original boundary of the county was reduced in 1840, when parts were partitioned off to create Huron and Tuscola counties. The county government was fully organized on December 31, 1849. In the middle of the 19th century, the area now called Port Sanilac was called Bark Shanty. It was named for a lone shanty made of bark, which was used to make shingles from pine. The county seat of Sanilac is the city of Sandusky.

== Geography ==
According to the U.S. Census Bureau, the county has a total area of 1,590 square miles (4,100 km^{2}), of which 963 square miles (2,490 km^{2}) is land and 627 square miles (1,620 km^{2}) (39%) is water. Sanilac County is the largest county in Michigan's Lower Peninsula by land area.

=== Adjacent counties ===
- Huron County (north)
- Tuscola County (west)
- St. Clair County (south)
- Lapeer County (southwest)
- Huron County, Ontario, Canada (east)

=== Major highways ===
- M-19
- M-25
- M-46
- M-53
- M-81
- M-90

== Demographics ==
Historical population
Census	Pop.	Note	%±
1850	2,112		—
1860	7,599		259.8%
1870	14,562		91.6%
1880	26,341		80.9%
1890	32,589		23.7%
1900	35,055		7.6%
1910	33,930		−3.2%
1920	31,237		−7.9%
1930	27,751		−11.2%
1940	30,114		8.5%
1950	30,837		2.4%
1960	32,314		4.8%
1970	34,889		8.0%
1980	40,789		16.9%
1990	39,928		−2.1%
2000	44,547		11.6%
2010	43,114		−3.2%
2020	40,611		−5.8%
2025 (est.)	40,038	▼	−1.4%
US Decennial Census; 1790-1960 1900-1990; 1990-2000 2010-2024

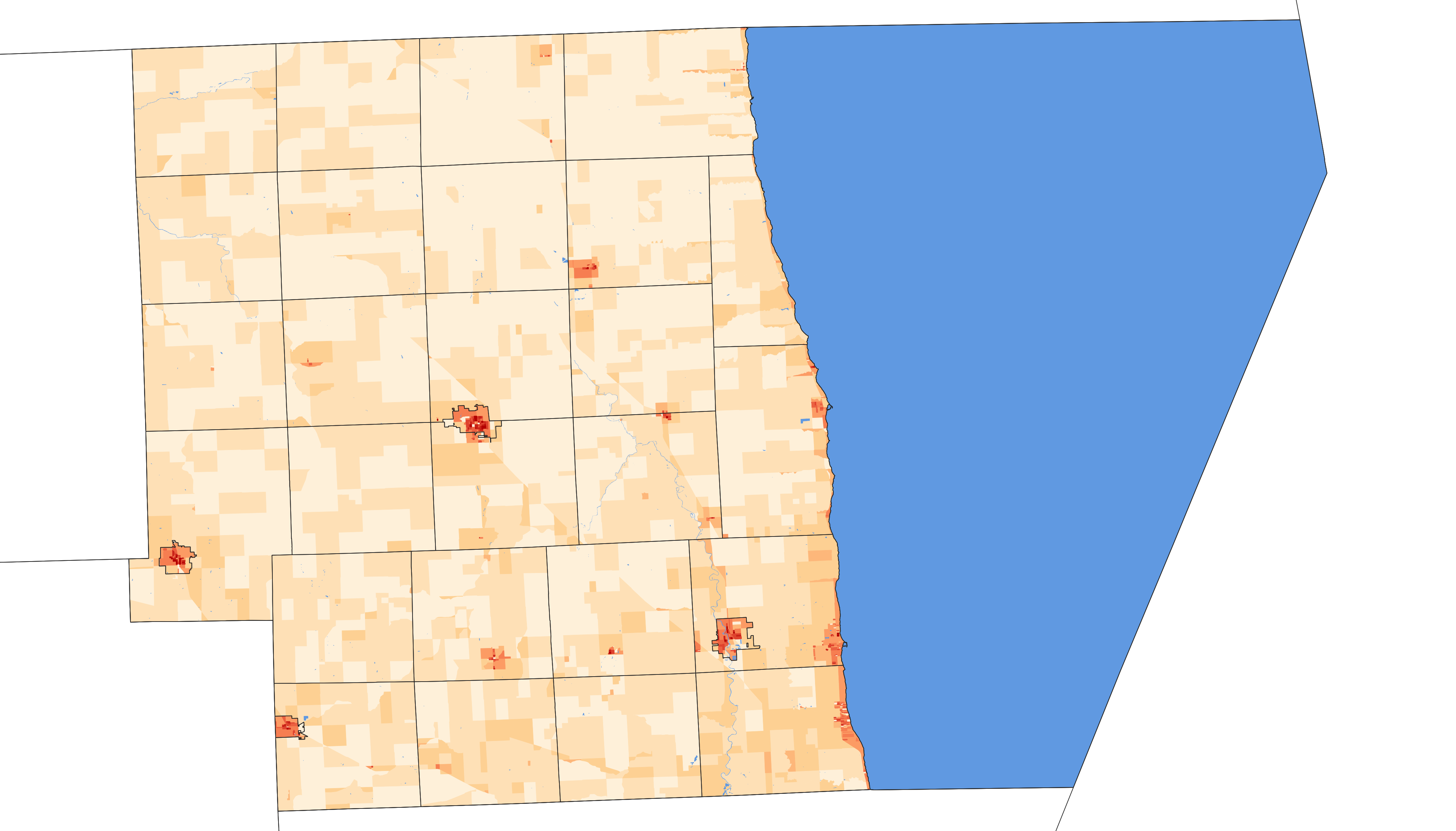
2020 population density of Sanilac County MI by census block

=== Racial and ethnic composition ===
Sanilac County, Michigan – Racial and ethnic composition Note: the US Census treats Hispanic/Latino as an ethnic category. This table excludes Latinos from the racial categories and assigns them to a separate category. Hispanics/Latinos may be of any race.
Race / Ethnicity (NH = Non-Hispanic)	Pop 1980	Pop 1990	Pop 2000	Pop 2010	Pop 2020	% 1980	% 1990	% 2000	% 2010	% 2020
White alone (NH)	39,727	38,725	42,518	40,852	37,209	97.40%	96.99%	95.45%	94.75%	91.62%
Black or African American alone (NH)	16	38	120	142	151	0.04%	0.10%	0.27%	0.33%	0.37%
Native American or Alaska Native alone (NH)	95	191	152	157	112	0.23%	0.48%	0.34%	0.36%	0.28%
Asian alone (NH)	50	59	113	125	84	0.12%	0.15%	0.25%	0.29%	0.21%
Native Hawaiian or Pacific Islander alone (NH)	x	x	3	7	2	x	x	0.01%	0.02%	0.00%
Other race alone (NH)	40	10	12	19	98	0.10%	0.03%	0.03%	0.04%	0.24%
Mixed race or Multiracial (NH)	x	x	390	373	1,281	x	x	0.88%	0.87%	3.15%
Hispanic or Latino (any race)	861	905	1,239	1,439	1,674	2.11%	2.27%	2.78%	3.34%	4.12%
Total	40,789	39,928	44,547	43,114	40,611	100.00%	100.00%	100.00%	100.00%	100.00%

=== 2020 census ===
As of the 2020 census, the county had a population of 40,611. The median age was 45.3 years. 21.4% of residents were under the age of 18 and 22.0% of residents were 65 years of age or older. For every 100 females there were 100.3 males, and for every 100 females age 18 and over there were 98.7 males age 18 and over.

The racial makeup of the county was 93.3% White, 0.4% Black or African American, 0.3% American Indian and Alaska Native, 0.2% Asian, <0.1% Native Hawaiian and Pacific Islander, 1.1% from some other race, and 4.6% from two or more races. Hispanic or Latino residents of any race comprised 4.1% of the population.

6.4% of residents lived in urban areas, while 93.6% lived in rural areas.

There were 16,781 households in the county, of which 25.5% had children under the age of 18 living in them. Of all households, 49.8% were married-couple households, 19.4% were households with a male householder and no spouse or partner present, and 23.6% were households with a female householder and no spouse or partner present. About 29.9% of all households were made up of individuals and 14.4% had someone living alone who was 65 years of age or older.

There were 21,676 housing units, of which 22.6% were vacant. Among occupied housing units, 79.4% were owner-occupied and 20.6% were renter-occupied. The homeowner vacancy rate was 1.5% and the rental vacancy rate was 7.6%.

=== 2010 census ===
The 2010 United States census indicates Sanilac County had a 2010 population of 43,114. This decrease of -1,433 people from the 2000 United States census represents a 3.2% population loss in the decade. In 2010 there were 17,132 households and 11,885 families in the county. The population density was 44.8 per square mile (17.3/km^{2}). There were 22,725 housing units at an average density of 23.6 per square mile (9.1/km^{2}). 96.6% of the population were White, 0.5% Native American, 0.3% Black or African American, 0.3% Asian, 1.1% of some other race and 1.2% of two or more races. 3.3% were Hispanic or Latino (of any race). 26.1% were of German, 11.0% Polish, 10.4% English, 8.3% Irish, 7.2% American and 5.1% French, French Canadian or Cajun ancestry.

There were 17,132 households, out of which 29.2% had children under the age of 18 living with them, 55.3% were husband and wife families, 9.8% had a female householder with no husband present, 30.6% were non-families, and 26.4% were made up of individuals. The average household size was 2.48 and the average family size was 2.97.

In the county, the population was spread out, with 23.6% under age of 18, 7.4% from 18 to 24, 21.8% from 25 to 44, 29.6% from 45 to 64, and 17.6% who were 65 years of age or older. The median age was 43 years. For every 100 females there were 97.8 males. For every 100 females age 18 and over, there were 96.7 males.

The 2010 American Community Survey 3-year estimate indicates the median income for a household in the county was $39,138 and the median income for a family was $47,885. Males had a median income of $27,440 versus $16,509 for females. The per capita income for the county was $19,671. About 1.5% of families and 16.1% of the population were below the poverty line, including 23.3% of those under the age 18 and 11.4% of those age 65 or over.

=== Religion ===
- The Roman Catholic Diocese of Saginaw is the controlling regional body for the Catholic Church.

== Government ==
Sanilac County has voted for the Republican nominee in every presidential election since the GOP's inaugural election in 1856 – except in 1912, when the county supported Theodore Roosevelt's Bull Moose Party campaign. However, they had voted for the Republican nominee in 1912, William Howard Taft in the previous election (1908). Hence, every person who has won the GOP's nomination has won Sanilac County, Michigan, as Theodore Roosevelt had also been the Republican nominee in 1904.

United States presidential election results for Sanilac County, Michigan
Year	Republican		Democratic		Third party(ies)	
Year	No.	%	No.	%	No.	%
1884	1,923	49.09%	1,817	46.39%	177	4.52%
1888	2,940	51.66%	2,434	42.77%	317	5.57%
1892	2,494	54.34%	1,730	37.69%	366	7.97%
1896	3,634	51.74%	3,156	44.93%	234	3.33%
1900	4,173	63.93%	2,065	31.64%	289	4.43%
1904	4,671	74.37%	1,217	19.38%	393	6.26%
1908	4,173	68.96%	1,474	24.36%	404	6.68%
1912	2,166	32.19%	1,161	17.26%	3,401	50.55%
1916	4,639	69.62%	1,867	28.02%	157	2.36%
1920	7,256	84.66%	1,146	13.37%	169	1.97%
1924	7,767	84.53%	983	10.70%	438	4.77%
1928	7,888	81.59%	1,736	17.96%	44	0.46%
1932	6,860	61.22%	4,077	36.39%	268	2.39%
1936	6,975	63.20%	3,285	29.77%	776	7.03%
1940	10,289	82.13%	2,195	17.52%	43	0.34%
1944	9,512	82.09%	2,015	17.39%	60	0.52%
1948	8,237	77.66%	2,167	20.43%	202	1.90%
1952	11,181	82.47%	2,298	16.95%	78	0.58%
1956	11,095	78.88%	2,954	21.00%	17	0.12%
1960	11,005	72.47%	4,153	27.35%	27	0.18%
1964	7,590	54.71%	6,266	45.16%	18	0.13%
1968	9,273	65.45%	3,193	22.54%	1,702	12.01%
1972	11,031	72.93%	3,780	24.99%	314	2.08%
1976	10,597	62.87%	6,042	35.84%	217	1.29%
1980	12,158	67.11%	4,898	27.04%	1,061	5.86%
1984	12,627	75.12%	4,126	24.54%	57	0.34%
1988	10,653	65.73%	5,445	33.60%	109	0.67%
1992	7,891	42.07%	5,868	31.28%	4,999	26.65%
1996	7,821	45.17%	7,092	40.96%	2,401	13.87%
2000	10,966	59.06%	7,153	38.53%	447	2.41%
2004	12,632	60.84%	7,883	37.97%	248	1.19%
2008	10,679	52.95%	9,047	44.86%	443	2.20%
2012	10,963	59.42%	7,212	39.09%	275	1.49%
2016	13,446	69.85%	4,873	25.32%	930	4.83%
2020	16,194	72.15%	5,966	26.58%	286	1.27%
2024	17,080	73.18%	5,957	25.52%	302	1.29%

United States Senate election results for Sanilac County, Michigan1
Year	Republican		Democratic		Third party(ies)	
Year	No.	%	No.	%	No.	%
2024	16,306	70.87%	6,056	26.32%	645	2.80%

Michigan Gubernatorial election results for Sanilac County
Year	Republican		Democratic		Third party(ies)	
Year	No.	%	No.	%	No.	%
2022	12,473	66.33%	5,967	31.73%	364	1.94%

The county government operates the jail, maintains rural roads, operates the major local courts, records deeds, mortgages, and vital records, administers public health regulations, and participates with the state in the provision of social services. The county board of commissioners controls the budget and has limited authority to make laws or ordinances. In Michigan, most local government functions — police and fire, building and zoning, tax assessment, street maintenance, etc. — are the responsibility of individual cities and townships.

=== Elected officials ===
- Prosecuting Attorney: James V. Young
- Sheriff: Paul Rich
- County Clerk: Denise McGuire
- County Treasurer: Trudy M. Nicol
- Register of Deeds: Michele VanNorman
- Drain Commissioner: Gregory L Alexander
- Circuit Court Judge: Hon. Timothy C. Wrathell
- Probate Court Judge: Hon. Gregory S. Ross
- District Court Judge: Hon. Gregory S Ross
- Commissioner – Dist 1: Jon Block
- Commissioner – Dist 2: Gary Heberling
- Commissioner – Dist 3: William Sarkella
- Commissioner – Dist 4: Bob Colely
- Commissioner – Dist 5: Paul Muxlow

== Media ==
- The county is served weekly by the Tribune-Recorder since 1893, the Sanilac County News of Sandusky and other small newspapers.
- Daily deliveries of the Port Huron Times Herald are available in Sanilac County.

== Communities ==
=== Cities ===
- Brown City
- Croswell
- Marlette
- Sandusky (county seat)

=== Villages ===
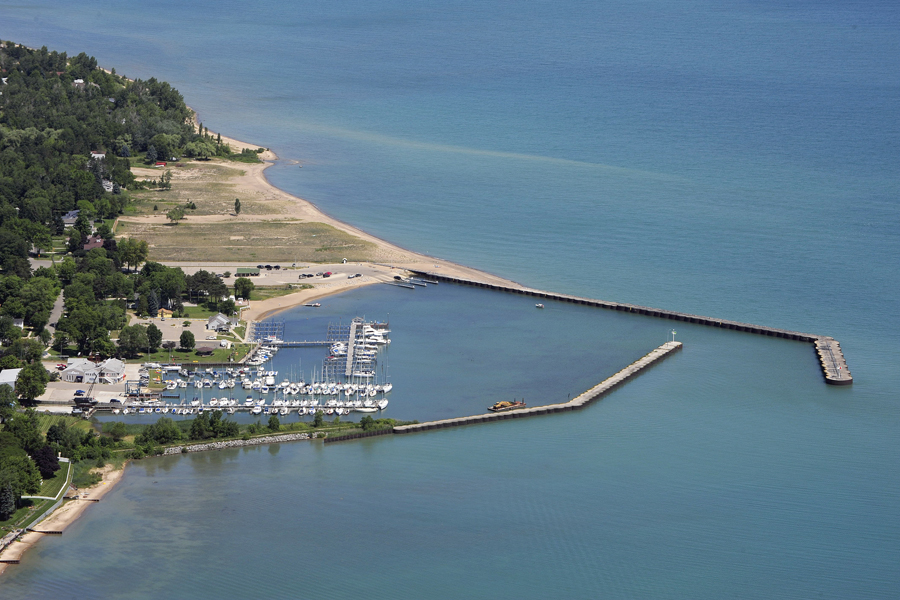
Port Sanilac Harbor

Downtown Lexington, Michigan

- Applegate
- Carsonville
- Deckerville
- Forestville
- Lexington
- Melvin
- Minden City
- Peck
- Port Sanilac

=== Census-designated place ===
- Snover

=== Other unincorporated communities ===
- Amadore
- Argyle
- Austin Center
- Birch Beach
- Blue Water Beach
- Cash
- Charleston
- Cumber
- Decker
- Downington
- Elmer
- Freidberger
- Great Lakes Beach
- Hemans
- Huronia Heights
- Juhl
- Laing
- Lexington Heights
- McGregor
- Omard
- Palms
- Tyre
- Watertown

=== Townships ===
- Argyle Township
- Austin Township
- Bridgehampton Township
- Buel Township
- Custer Township
- Delaware Township
- Elk Township
- Elmer Township
- Evergreen Township
- Flynn Township
- Forester Township
- Fremont Township
- Greenleaf Township
- Lamotte Township
- Lexington Township
- Maple Valley Township
- Marion Township
- Marlette Township
- Minden Township
- Moore Township
- Sanilac Township
- Speaker Township
- Washington Township
- Watertown Township
- Wheatland Township
- Worth Township

== See also ==
- List of Michigan State Historic Sites in Sanilac County
- National Register of Historic Places listings in Sanilac County, Michigan
