= Wheatland Township, Sanilac County, Michigan =

Wheatland Township, Michigan
- Township
- Location within the state of Michigan Wheatland Township, Michigan (the United States)
- Coordinates: 43°32′54″N 82°48′20″W
- Country: United States
- State: Michigan
- County: Sanilac

Area
  - Total: 36.4 sq mi (94.3 km^{2})
  - Land: 36.4 sq mi (94.2 km^{2})
  - Water: 0.039 sq mi (0.1 km^{2})
- Elevation: 781 ft (238 m)

Population (2020)
  - Total: 416
  - Density: 11/sq mi (4.4/km^{2})
- Time zone: UTC-5 (Eastern (EST))
  - Summer (DST): UTC-4 (EDT)
- FIPS code: 26-86580
- GNIS feature ID: 1627257

Wheatland Township is a civil township of Sanilac County in the U.S. state of Michigan. The population was 416 at the 2020 census.

== Communities ==
- Chevingston was an unincorporated community in Wheatland Township. It formed around a sawmill started by Charles Reinelt. It had a post office from 1893 until 1906.

== Geography ==
According to the United States Census Bureau, the township has a total area of 36.4 square miles (94.3 km^{2}), of which 36.4 square miles (94.2 km^{2}) is land and 0.1 square mile (0.1 km^{2}) (0.14%) is water.

== Demographics ==
Historical population
Census	Pop.	Note	%±
2000	530		—
2010	488		−7.9%
2020	416		−14.8%

As of the census of 2000, there were 530 people, 187 households, and 144 families residing in the township. The population density was 14.6 per square mile (5.6/km^{2}). There were 216 housing units at an average density of 5.9 per square mile (2.3/km^{2}). The racial makeup of the township was 97.92% White, 0.94% Native American, 0.75% from other races, and 0.38% from two or more races. Hispanic or Latino of any race were 1.51% of the population.

There were 187 households, out of which 35.8% had children under the age of 18 living with them, 65.8% were married couples living together, 5.9% had a female householder with no husband present, and 22.5% were non-families. 18.2% of all households were made up of individuals, and 8.6% had someone living alone who was 65 years of age or older. The average household size was 2.83 and the average family size was 3.22.

In the township the population was spread out, with 30.9% under the age of 18, 7.9% from 18 to 24, 27.4% from 25 to 44, 20.2% from 45 to 64, and 13.6% who were 65 years of age or older. The median age was 34 years. For every 100 females, there were 110.3 males. For every 100 females age 18 and over, there were 100.0 males.

The median income for a household in the township was $33,750, and the median income for a family was $35,833. Males had a median income of $29,063 versus $20,208 for females. The per capita income for the township was $13,919. About 4.4% of families and 4.3% of the population were below the poverty line, including 2.2% of those under age 18 and 12.7% of those age 65 or over.
