= Deckerville, Michigan =

- Village
- Motto: "The Sunrise Side of the State"
- Location of Deckerville, Michigan
- Coordinates: 43°31′33″N 82°44′18″W
- Country: United States
- State: Michigan
- County: Sanilac

Area
  - Total: 1.25 sq mi (3.23 km^{2})
  - Land: 1.25 sq mi (3.23 km^{2})
  - Water: 0 sq mi (0.00 km^{2})
- Elevation: 827 ft (252 m)

Population (2020)
  - Total: 877
  - Density: 703.3/sq mi (271.55/km^{2})
- Time zone: UTC-5 (Eastern (EST))
  - Summer (DST): UTC-4 (EDT)
- ZIP code: 48427
- Area code: 810
- FIPS code: 26-21100
- GNIS feature ID: 0624443
- Website: Deckerville, Michigan

Deckerville is a village in Sanilac County in the U.S. state of Michigan. The population was 877 at the 2020 census.

== History ==
The village was named after Charles Decker, a local settler.

Deckerville was platted in 1870 and incorporated in 1893.

== Geography ==
According to the United States Census Bureau, the village has a total area of 1.25 square miles (3.24 km^{2}), all land.

== Demographics ==
Historical population
Census	Pop.	Note	%±
1880	100		—
1900	398		—
1910	628		57.8%
1920	782		24.5%
1930	523		−33.1%
1940	647		23.7%
1950	719		11.1%
1960	798		11.0%
1970	817		2.4%
1980	887		8.6%
1990	1,015		14.4%
2000	944		−7.0%
2010	830		−12.1%
2020	877		5.7%
U.S. Decennial Census

=== 2010 census ===
As of the census of 2010, there were 830 people, 311 households, and 201 families living in the village. The population density was 664.0 inhabitants per square mile (256.4/km^{2}). There were 388 housing units at an average density of 310.4 per square mile (119.8/km^{2}). The racial makeup of the village was 94.7% White, 0.2% African American, 1.4% Native American, 0.1% Asian, 2.2% from other races, and 1.3% from two or more races. Hispanic or Latino of any race were 8.7% of the population.

There were 311 households, of which 34.1% had children under the age of 18 living with them, 41.2% were married couples living together, 17.4% had a female householder with no husband present, 6.1% had a male householder with no wife present, and 35.4% were non-families. 33.1% of all households were made up of individuals, and 17.1% had someone living alone who was 65 years of age or older. The average household size was 2.46 and the average family size was 3.01.

The median age in the village was 38.6 years. 25.7% of residents were under the age of 18; 10.1% were between the ages of 18 and 24; 20.1% were from 25 to 44; 22.8% were from 45 to 64; and 21.3% were 65 years of age or older. The gender makeup of the village was 46.7% male and 53.3% female.

=== 2000 census ===
As of the census of 2000, there were 944 people, 369 households, and 215 families living in the village. The population density was 738.5 inhabitants per square mile (285.1/km^{2}). There were 411 housing units at an average density of 321.5 per square mile (124.1/km^{2}). The racial makeup of the village was 94.70% White, 0.32% African American, 0.32% Native American, 0.11% Asian, 3.18% from other races, and 1.38% from two or more races. Hispanic or Latino of any race were 8.05% of the population.

There were 369 households, out of which 26.8% had children under the age of 18 living with them, 42.3% were married couples living together, 13.3% had a female householder with no husband present, and 41.5% were non-families. 35.8% of all households were made up of individuals, and 15.4% had someone living alone who was 65 years of age or older. The average household size was 2.33 and the average family size was 3.02.

In the village, the population was spread out, with 23.6% under the age of 18, 8.1% from 18 to 24, 26.0% from 25 to 44, 20.1% from 45 to 64, and 22.2% who were 65 years of age or older. The median age was 40 years. For every 100 females, there were 84.4 males. For every 100 females age 18 and over, there were 80.3 males.

The median income for a household in the village was $30,083, and the median income for a family was $39,063. Males had a median income of $31,250 versus $22,102 for females. The per capita income for the village was $18,791. About 8.9% of families and 14.0% of the population were below the poverty line, including 17.3% of those under age 18 and 15.2% of those age 65 or over.
