= Sandusky, Michigan =

- City
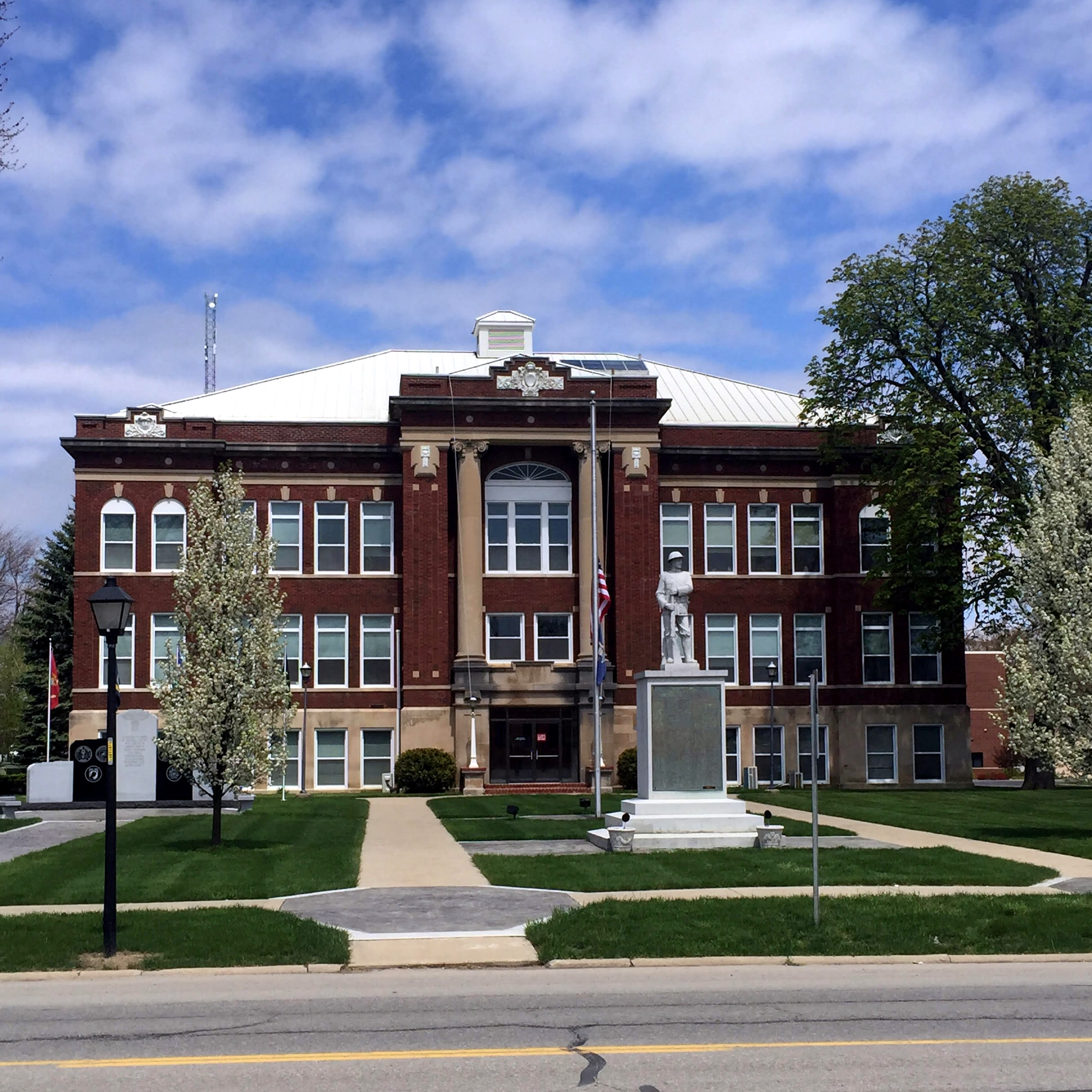
- Sanilac County Courthouse

- Location of Sandusky, Michigan
- Coordinates: 43°25′13″N 82°49′47″W
- Country: United States
- State: Michigan
- County: Sanilac

Government
  - Type: 4th Class City
  - Mayor: Tom Lukshaitis (NP)
  - City Manager: David Faber

Area
  - Total: 2.15 sq mi (5.57 km^{2})
  - Land: 2.15 sq mi (5.56 km^{2})
  - Water: 0.0039 sq mi (0.01 km^{2})
- Elevation: 771 ft (235 m)

Population (2020)
  - Total: 2,709
  - Density: 1,261.9/sq mi (487.24/km^{2})
- Time zone: UTC−5 (Eastern (EST))
  - Summer (DST): UTC−4 (EDT)
- ZIP Code: 48471
- Area code: 810
- FIPS code: 26-71540
- GNIS feature ID: 0637223
- Website: https://www.misandusky.com/

Sandusky is the most populous city and county seat of Sanilac County, Michigan. As of the 2020 census, Sandusky had a population of 2,709.

== Geography ==
- According to the United States Census Bureau, the city has a total area of 2.14 square miles (5.54 km^{2}), all land.
- It is considered to be part of the Thumb of Michigan, which in turn is a subregion Central or Mid Michigan.
  - Sandusky can also be considered as in the Blue Water Area, a subregion generally considered in or south of the Thumb.

== School ==
Sandusky is served by Sandusky Community Schools. The district has an elementary school and a junior/senior high school. Sandusky is home to the Wolves, who usually play sports in the Big Thumb Conference Black Division (formerly the Greater Thumb East Conference). For most sports, Sandusky is an MHSAA Division 3 school.

== Transportation ==
- M-19
- M-46

== Demographics ==
Historical population
Census	Pop.	Note	%±
1890	403		—
1900	578		43.4%
1910	993		71.8%
1920	1,228		23.7%
1930	1,305		6.3%
1940	1,512		15.9%
1950	1,819		20.3%
1960	2,066		13.6%
1970	2,071		0.2%
1980	2,216		7.0%
1990	2,403		8.4%
2000	2,745		14.2%
2010	2,679		−2.4%
2020	2,709		1.1%
U.S. Decennial Census

=== 2020 census ===
As of the 2020 census, Sandusky had a population of 2,709. The median age was 43.2 years. 19.2% of residents were under the age of 18 and 21.0% of residents were 65 years of age or older. For every 100 females there were 92.5 males, and for every 100 females age 18 and over there were 91.1 males age 18 and over.

0.0% of residents lived in urban areas, while 100.0% lived in rural areas.

There were 1,190 households in Sandusky, of which 23.9% had children under the age of 18 living in them. Of all households, 30.2% were married-couple households, 21.9% were households with a male householder and no spouse or partner present, and 40.3% were households with a female householder and no spouse or partner present. About 44.1% of all households were made up of individuals and 18.4% had someone living alone who was 65 years of age or older.

There were 1,282 housing units, of which 7.2% were vacant. The homeowner vacancy rate was 2.7% and the rental vacancy rate was 3.9%.

Racial composition as of the 2020 census
Race	Number	Percent
White	2,477	91.4%
Black or African American	57	2.1%
American Indian and Alaska Native	5	0.2%
Asian	12	0.4%
Native Hawaiian and Other Pacific Islander	1	0.0%
Some other race	42	1.6%
Two or more races	115	4.2%
Hispanic or Latino (of any race)	108	4.0%

=== 2010 census ===
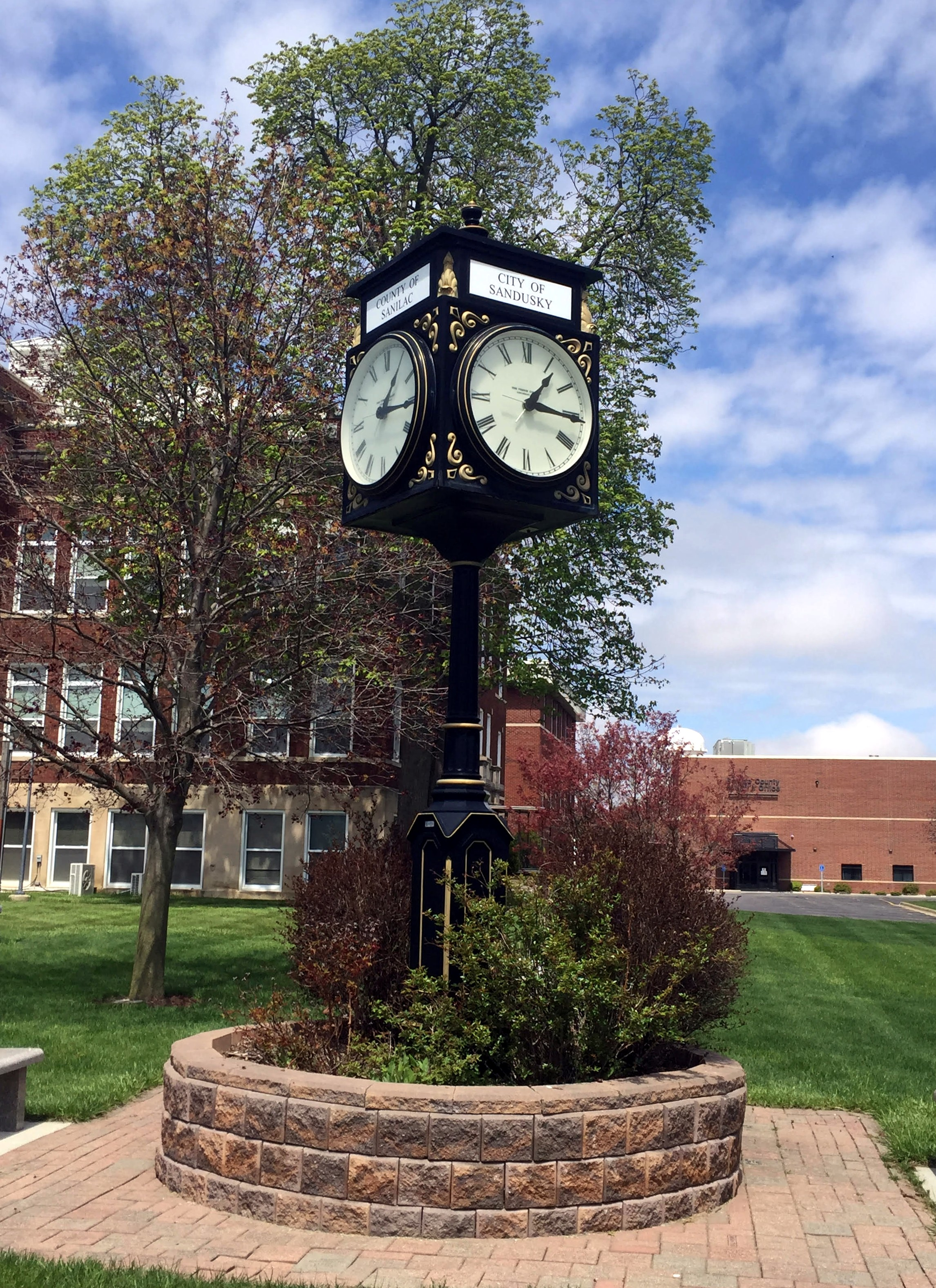
Street clock, Sanilac County Courthouse lawn

As of the census of 2010, there were 2,679 people, 1,124 households, and 616 families living in the city. The population density was 1,251.9 inhabitants per square mile (483.4/km^{2}). There were 1,258 housing units at an average density of 587.9 per square mile (227.0/km^{2}). The racial makeup of the city was 94.4% White, 1.5% African American, 0.3% Native American, 1.1% Asian, 1.3% from other races, and 1.4% from two or more races. Hispanic or Latino of any race were 3.5% of the population.

There were 1,124 households, of which 28.5% had children under the age of 18 living with them, 36.1% were married couples living together, 15.1% had a female householder with no husband present, 3.6% had a male householder with no wife present, and 45.2% were non-families. 40.2% of all households were made up of individuals, and 17.5% had someone living alone who was 65 years of age or older. The average household size was 2.16 and the average family size was 2.85.

The median age in the city was 41.4 years. 21.3% of residents were under the age of 18; 9.4% were between the ages of 18 and 24; 23.5% were from 25 to 44; 27.7% were from 45 to 64; and 18.1% were 65 years of age or older. The gender makeup of the city was 45.7% male and 54.3% female.

=== 2000 census ===
As of the census of 2000, there were 2,745 people, 1,081 households, and 649 families living in the city. The population density was 1,446.3 inhabitants per square mile (558.4/km^{2}). There were 1,168 housing units at an average density of 615.4 per square mile (237.6/km^{2}). The racial makeup of the city was 95.12% White, 0.87% African American, 0.15% Native American, 1.75% Asian, 1.35% from other races, and 0.77% from two or more races. Hispanic or Latino of any race were 3.42% of the population.

There were 1,081 households, out of which 31.2% had children under the age of 18 living with them, 43.6% were married couples living together, 13.0% had a female householder with no husband present, and 39.9% were non-families. 35.9% of all households were made up of individuals, and 16.7% had someone living alone who was 65 years of age or older. The average household size was 2.32 and the average family size was 2.97.

In the city, the population was spread out, with 22.8% under the age of 18, 9.3% from 18 to 24, 29.5% from 25 to 44, 19.6% from 45 to 64, and 18.8% who were 65 years of age or older. The median age was 38 years. For every 100 females, there were 86.5 males. For every 100 females age 18 and over, there were 85.8 males.

The median income for a household in the city was $33,667, and the median income for a family was $44,622. Males had a median income of $31,531 versus $20,932 for females. The per capita income for the city was $17,639. About 7.2% of families and 11.0% of the population were below the poverty line, including 8.9% of those under age 18 and 14.0% of those age 65 or over.

== Media ==
=== Radio ===
Local radio stations licensed to serve Sandusky are commercial broadcasters WMIC AM and WTGV FM, owned by Sanilac/GB Broadcasting; and religious station WNFR.

==== FM ====
- WHYT 88.1 FM, Imlay City, Contemporary Christian, Smile FM
- WNFR 90.7 FM, Sandusky, Contemporary Christian 90.7 Hope FM
- WIDL 92.1 FM, Cass City, Classic Rock I-92, The Thumb's Only Road for Pure Classic Rock
- WBGV 92.5 FM, Marlette, Country, The Thumb's Best Country
- WHNN 96.1 FM, Bay City, Adult Contemporary, My 96-1, The Best Variety of Yesterday and Today
- WBTI 96.9 FM, Lexington, CHR/Top 40, Today's Hit Music
- WTGV 97.7 FM, Sandusky, Classic Hits, 97-7 WTGV, The Thumb's Greatest Hits
- WKCQ 98.1 FM, Saginaw, Country, 98 KCQ, The Most Country
- WLEW 102.1 FM, Bad Axe, Classic Hits, Cruise 102, The Station That Rocks the Docks and Shakes the Lakes
- WQUS 103.1 FM, Lapeer, Classic Rock, U.S. 103.1, Ultimate Classic Rock
- WCZE 103.7 FM, Harbor Beach, Christian Country, Positive Country 103.7
- WSAQ 107.1 FM, Port Huron, Country, Q-Country, The Greatest Country Music of All Time

==== AM ====
- WMIC 660 AM, Sandusky (Daytime Only), Full Service/Country, The Thumb's Information Station
- WSGW 790 AM, Saginaw, News/Talk, Your Connection to the Saginaw Valley and the World
- CHOK 1070 AM, Sarnia, Full Service/AC, First in Local Information
- WMPC 1230 AM, Lapeer, Religious, Where Many Preach Christ
- WLEW 1340 AM, Bad Axe, Country, The Thumb's Hottest Country
- WKYO 1360 AM, Caro, Classic Country, Classic Country WKYO
- WPHM 1380 AM, Port Huron, News/Talk/Sports, Where the Blue Water Area Comes to Talk
- WHLS 1450 AM, Port Huron, Active Rock, Rock 105.5, Port Huron's Alternative
- WLCO 1530 AM, Lapeer, Classic Country, Real Country, Today's Stars and Legends

=== Newspaper ===
- Sandusky and Sanilac County are served by The Tribune Recorder Leader, which hits news racks on Wednesdays and mailboxes on Thursdays, and by the Sanilac County News.
- Daily editions of the Detroit Free Press, The Detroit News and the Port Huron Times Herald are also available throughout the area.

== Climate ==
This climatic region is typified by large seasonal temperature differences, with warm to hot (and often humid) summers and cold (sometimes severely cold) winters. According to the Köppen Climate Classification system, Sandusky has a humid continental climate, abbreviated "Dfb" on climate maps.

== Government ==
Sandusky city is governed under the 4th Class City charter, original written in 1895 as the Fourth Class City Act then recognized as the cities' charter in 1976.
