= Snover, Michigan =

- Census-designated place (CDP) & unincorporated community
- St. Joseph Catholic Church

- Location within Michigan Location within the United States
- Coordinates: 43°27′40″N 82°58′15″W
- Country: United States
- State: Michigan
- County: Sanilac

Area
  - Total: 3.42 sq mi (8.85 km^{2})
  - Land: 3.42 sq mi (8.85 km^{2})
  - Water: 0 sq mi (0.00 km^{2})
- Elevation: 774 ft (236 m)

Population (2020)
  - Total: 330
  - Density: 97/sq mi (37.3/km^{2})
- Time zone: UTC-5 (Eastern (EST))
  - Summer (DST): UTC-4 (EDT)
- ZIP code: 48472
- Area code: 810
- GNIS feature ID: 620195

Snover is an unincorporated community and census-designated place in Moore Township, Sanilac County, Michigan, United States. As of the 2020 census, Snover had a population of 330. Snover has a post office with ZIP code 48472. The community was named for Horace G. Snover, who represented the area in Congress from 1895 to 1898.

== Geography ==
According to the U.S. Census Bureau, the community has an area of 6.874 square miles (17.80 km^{2}), of which 6.873 square miles (17.80 km^{2}) is land and 0.001 square miles (0.0026 km^{2}) is water.

== Demographics ==
Historical population
Census	Pop.	Note	%±
2020	330		—
U.S. Decennial Census
