= List of Michigan State Historic Sites in Sanilac County =

Location of Sanilac County in Michigan

The following is a list of Michigan State Historic Sites in Sanilac County, Michigan. Sites marked with a dagger (†) are also listed on the National Register of Historic Places in Sanilac County, Michigan.

== Current listings ==
Name	Image	Location	City	Listing date
Brown City Banner Commemorative Designation		Main Street	Brown City	August 31, 1993
Brown City Community Schools		4290 Second Street	Brown City	1986
Buel Methodist Episcopal Church		Peck Road (M-90), 5 miles W of Croswell	Croswell	August 24, 1984
Cadillac House†	Cadillac House-Lexington	5502 Main St.	Lexington	February 18, 1982
Old Catholic Rectory		7229 Denissen Street	Lexington	February 7, 1977
Church of the Good Shepherd		5646 Main Street, NW corner of Hubbard Street	Lexington	April 5, 1974
Croswell Chapel of Trinity Episcopal Church		124 North Howard	Croswell	February 7, 1977
Thomas U. Dawson House		6560 Ellsworth	Marlette	January 22, 1987
John L. Fead House†		5349 Washington Street	Lexington	February 7, 1977
Flint and Pere Marquette Railroad Depot		3325 Main Street	Marlette	August 16, 2001
Great Lake Storm of 1913 Informational Designation		Roadside Park on M-25, 1.5 miles south of Port Sanilac	Port Sanilac	November 27, 1956
Huckins-Norman Farmhouse		7127 Lake Street	Lexington	June 6, 1977
Lexington Bank of B. R. Noble		7245 Huron Avenue	Lexington	September 8, 1982
Lexington Town Hall and Masonic Temple		5475–5477 Main Street	Lexington	February 18, 1982
Joseph M. Loop House†		228 South Ridge Street	Port Sanilac	December 10, 1971
Marlette Township Library		3116 Gurdon T. Wolfe Avenue	Marlette	August 3, 1979
Charles H. Moore Library†		7239 Huron Avenue	Lexington	August 12, 1977
Thomas and Margaret Spencer Matthews Farm†		5916 Gardner Line Road	Croswell	February 16, 1995
Charles H. Moore-Albert E. Sleeper House†		7277 Simons Street	Lexington	April 15, 1977
New Carroll House		4164 Main	Brown City	January 19, 1989
William Reuben Nims House†		7156 Huron Avenue (M-90)	Lexington	December 3, 1980
Rudolph Papst House		734 Huron Avenue	Lexington	February 10, 1983
Port Sanilac Masonic and Town Hall†		20 Ridge	Port Sanilac	June 15, 1979
Uri Raymond House		111 S Ridge Street (M-25)	Port Sanilac	May 21, 1992
Sanilac Petroglyphs Historic State Park† (20SL1)		8251 Germania Road	Greenleaf Township	April 24, 1970
Snay Cemetery		Snay Road	Palms	November 16, 1995
The Wolfel House		Southeast corner of Main and Lester Streets	Lexington	October 2, 1980
Tug Sport Shipwreck Site† (20UH105)		3 miles offshore in Lake Huron	Lexington	January 23, 1992
Judge Watson Beach House		6993 Huron Avenue	Lexington	November 2, 1980
L. Philip Wixson House		5774 Main Street	Lexington	October 11, 1990

== See also ==
- National Register of Historic Places listings in Sanilac County, Michigan

== Sources ==
- Historic Sites Online – Sanilac County. Michigan State Housing Developmental Authority. Accessed June 3, 2011.
