= National Register of Historic Places listings in Sanilac County, Michigan =

Location of Sanilac County in Michigan

This is a list of the National Register of Historic Places listings in Sanilac County, Michigan.

This is intended to be a complete list of the properties and districts on the National Register of Historic Places in Sanilac County, Michigan, United States. Latitude and longitude coordinates are provided for many National Register properties and districts; these locations may be seen together in a map.

There are 12 properties and districts listed on the National Register in the county.

This National Park Service list is complete through NPS recent listings posted November 6, 2026.

== Current listings ==
	Name on the Register	Image	Date listed	Location	City or town	Description
1	Cadillac House	Cadillac House	December 4, 2018 (#100003216)	5502 Main St. 43°16′06″N 82°31′52″W	Lexington	A three-story Italianate commercial building built in 1860 as a hotel.
2	John Divine Law Office–Moore Public Library	John Divine Law Office–Moore Public Library	January 31, 1985 (#85000167)	7239 Huron Ave. 43°16′06″N 82°31′57″W	Lexington	A two-story brick building built as a store and law offices, later converted to a library.
3	John L. Fead House	John L. Fead House	October 5, 1978 (#78001510)	5349 Washington St. 43°16′18″N 82°31′45″W	Lexington	Queen Anne style residential structure, ca. 1890s.
4	Joseph M. Loop House	Joseph M. Loop House	November 9, 1972 (#72000654)	228 S. Ridge; 43°25′28″N 82°32′38″W	Port Sanilac	1870s residential structure in the Second Empire style. Now operated as a museum.
5	Thomas and Margaret Spencer Matthews Farm	Thomas and Margaret Spencer Matthews Farm	April 7, 1995 (#95000371)	5916 E. Gardner Line Rd., Worth Township; 43°12′28″N 82°34′48″W	Amadore	Farm owned by immigrants from Canada in the mid to late 19th century.
6	Charles H. Moore–Albert E. Sleeper House	Charles H. Moore–Albert E. Sleeper House	January 11, 1985 (#85000064)	7277 Simons St. 43°16′10″N 82°31′50″W	Lexington	Home built ca. 1860 with Gothic Revival and Queen Anne architectural elements.
7	William Reuben Nims House	William Reuben Nims House	April 11, 1985 (#85000719)	7156 Huron Ave. 43°16′03″N 82°32′09″W	Lexington	Italianate, brick residence built in 1874.
8	Port Sanilac Light Station	Port Sanilac Light Station	July 19, 1984 (#84001842)	Lake St. 43°25′44″N 82°32′24″W	Port Sanilac	U.S. Coast Guard lighthouse on Lake Huron. First lit in 1886.
9	Port Sanilac Masonic and Town Hall	Port Sanilac Masonic and Town Hall	July 25, 1996 (#96000808)	20 N. Ridge St. 43°25′53″N 82°32′31″W	Port Sanilac	Former Masonic lodge built in 1880s.
10	W.R. Roach Cannery Warehouse and Office Building	W.R. Roach Cannery Warehouse and Office Building	July 20, 2005 (#05000717)	89 E. Sanborn; 43°16′21″N 82°36′54″W	Croswell	Former office building and warehouse, now converted to apartments, that served an adjacent cannery and vinery.
11	Sanilac Petroglyphs (ezhibiigadek asin)	Sanilac Petroglyphs (ezhibiigadek asin)	January 25, 1971 (#71001024)	8251 Germania Rd. 43°39′28″N 83°01′07″W	Greenleaf Township	240-acre state park that contains pre-Columbian Native American petroglyphs.
12	SPORT (tug) Shipwreck Site	SPORT (tug) Shipwreck Site	October 29, 1992 (#92001503)	Three miles off the coast of Lexington; 43°16′00″N 82°27′54″W	Lexington	Underwater wreck of a tugboat that sank in 1920.

== See also ==
- List of Michigan State Historic Sites in Sanilac County, Michigan
- List of National Historic Landmarks in Michigan
- National Register of Historic Places listings in Michigan
- Listings in neighboring counties: Huron, Lapeer, St. Clair, Tuscola
