= Croswell-Lexington Community Schools =

School district in Michigan

Address
- 5407 Peck Road Croswell, Sanilac County, Michigan, 48422; United States

District information
- Grades: Pre-Kindergarten-12
- Superintendent: Colette Moody
- Schools: 5
- Budget: $28,495,000 2022-2023 expenditures
- NCES District ID: 2611140

Students and staff
- Students: 1,708 (2024-2025)
- Teachers: 98.8 (on an FTE basis) (2024-2025)
- Staff: 238.0 FTE (2024-2025)
- Student–teacher ratio: 17.29 (2024-2025)

Other information
- Website: www.croslex.org

Croswell-Lexington Community Schools is a public school district in Sanilac County, Michigan. It serves Croswell, Lexington, part of Applegate, the townships of Worth and Lexington, and parts of the townships of Buel, Fremont, Sanilac, Speaker, and Washington. It also serves parts of the townships of Burtchville, Grant, and Greenwood in St. Clair County

== History ==
In Lexington, a high school existed as early as 1888, when it was mentioned in a local newspaper. Croswell's high school graduated its first class in 1892. A new Croswell High school was built around 1910. The Geiger Early Childhood Center/Pioneer High School, formerly Geiger Elementary, is located on the site of the 1910 high school building.

The Croswell and Lexington districts merged in 1948, and the Lexington High School became a grade school and the Croswell High School became Croswell-Lexington High. The district is commonly referred to as Cros-Lex, a term that first appeared in the newspaper in 1949 to refer to the merged high school.

The 1950 Cros-Lex High School yearbook pictures the historic schools still in use in the district at that time: Besides Cros-Lex High, both Croswell and Lexington had brick multistory grade schools whose original sections had hip roofs crowned by central bell towers. Lexington's grade school was built in 1892. Croswell's grade school was built in 1895.

The current Cros-Lex High School was built in 1963 and dedicated on December 15, 1963. The architect was Charles M. Valentine. A large renovation and expansion project was completed in 2011.

Lexington's 1892 school was torn down around 1965. Cros-Lex Middle School was built in 1972.

Milton J. Geiger Elementary School, named after a prominent veterinarian who was active in the county's 4-H club, opened in 1974. It reused a section of the former high school building that was built around 1952. The former high school had been used as a junior high school since 1963. The demolition crew that tore down the 1908 high school building in 1973, to make room for the new elementary school section, were all Croswell High graduates.

== Schools ==
Schools in Croswell-Lexington Community Schools district
School	Address	Notes
Croswell-Lexington High School	5461 Peck Road, Croswell	Grades 9–12. Built 1963.
Pioneer High School	15 S. Howard St., Croswell	Grades 9–12. Alternative high school
Croswell-Lexington Middle School	5485 E. Peck Rd., Croswell	Grades 5–8. Built 1972.
Frostick Elementary	57 S. Howard Ave., Croswell	Grades K-4
Meyer Elementary	7201 Lake Street, Lexington	Grades K-4
Geiger Early Childhood Center	15 S. Howard Ave., Croswell	Preschool. Shares a building with Pioneer High School.
