= Carsonville-Port Sanilac Schools =

School district in Michigan, United States

Address
- 100 North Goetze Road Carsonville, Sanilac County, Michigan, 48419; United States

District information
- Grades: PreKindergarten–12
- Superintendent: Doug Muxlow
- Schools: 3
- Budget: $6,557,000 2022–2023 expenditures
- NCES District ID: 2608160

Students and staff
- Students: 405 (2024–2025)
- Teachers: 19.79 (on an FTE basis) (2024–2025)
- Staff: 55.98 FTE (2024–2025)
- Student–teacher ratio: 20.46 (2024–2025)
- District mascot: Tigers

Other information
- Website: www.carsonvilleportsanilac.com

Carsonville-Port Sanilac Schools is a public school district in Sanilac County, in the Thumb region of Michigan. It serves Carsonville, Port Sanilac, part of Applegate, and parts of the townships of Bridgehampton, Buel, Lexington, Sanilac, Washington, and Watertown.

== History ==
Formerly Carsonville Community Schools, the district changed its name in July 1973 to Carsonville-Port Sanilac Schools. Port Sanilac's school was closed around 1981.

Carsonville Elementary was built in sections over several years, and its building was formerly home to the district's high school. The first section, a three-story brick building, was built in 1917. An elementary school wing was added in 1966. The original section was torn down in 1990, but the bell was preserved for the front lawn.

District leaders proposed a new high school to the community in August 1973. Voters passed a bond issue to fund its construction that November, and it opened on October 20, 1975. It was dedicated on January 18, 1976.

Voters passed bond issues to remodel and improve district facilities in 2000 and 2020. In 2023, an independent study commissioned by the district forecast enrollment growth of 16 to 38 percent by 2028. Another bond issue passed in 2024.

== Schools ==
Schools in Carsonville-Port Sanilac Schools district
School	Address	Notes
Carsonville-Port Sanilac Junior/Senior High School	100 North Goetze Road, Carsonville	Grades 6-12.
Carsonville-Port Sanilac Elementary	4115 East Chandler Road, Carsonville	Grades PreK-5
Carsonville-Port Sanilac Learning Center	100 North Goetze Road, Carsonville	Alternative high school
