= Sanilac =

Sanilac can refer to:

- Sanilac County, Michigan
- Sanilac Township, Michigan
- Port Sanilac, Michigan
- Port Sanilac Lighthouse
- Port Sanilac Masonic and Town Hall
- Sanilac Petroglyphs Historic State Park
- Sanilac Shores Underwater Preserve

== See also ==
- Sanilhac (disambiguation)
