= Nims House =

Nims House may refer to:

== In the United States ==
=== Michigan ===
- William Reuben Nims House, Lexington
- Rudolph Nims House, Monroe
