= Peter Matthews (rebel) =

Canadian farmer and soldier (1789–1838)

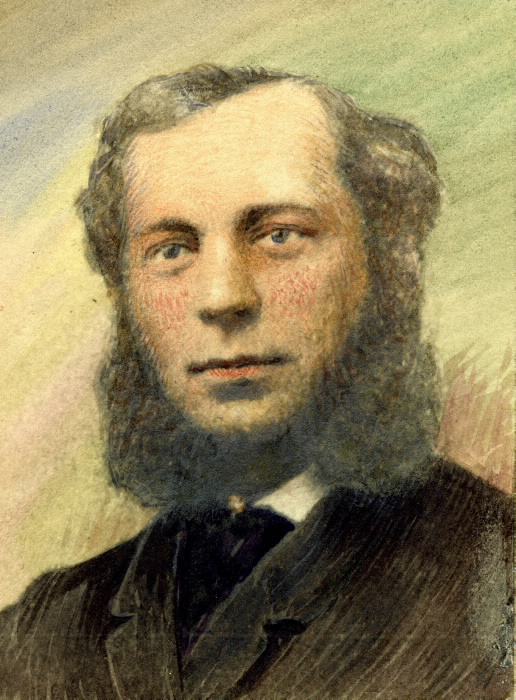
Peter Matthews

Captain Peter Matthews (1796 – April 12, 1838) was a farmer and soldier who participated in the Upper Canada Rebellion of 1837.

== Biography ==
He was born in the Bay of Quinte region of Upper Canada around 1789, the son of Captain Thomas Elmes Matthews and Mary Ruttan, United Empire Loyalists with both Dutch and French (including Huguenot) as well as English ancestry. In 1799, the family moved to Pickering Township. Peter Matthews served with Isaac Brock as a sergeant in the local militia during the War of 1812. In 1837, Matthews was active in the political union movement pressuring the British government to grant reforms, and in December of that year, was persuaded to lead a group from Pickering Township to join William Lyon Mackenzie's uprising.

Matthews' group of 60 men arrived at Montgomery's Tavern on December 6 and, on the following day, were assigned to create a diversion on the bridge over the Don River. They killed one man and set fire to the bridge and some nearby houses before they were driven off by the government forces.

Matthews was arraigned on March 26, 1838, before Sir John Robinson, 1st Baronet, of Toronto after having been held through the winter in jail. He pleaded guilty to treason on the advice of his counsel Robert Baldwin, who provided a less than robust defense given his views on reform. Against the advice of Charles Grant, 1st Baron Glenelg, Robinson and Sir George Arthur, 1st Baronet, as Lieutenant Governor of Upper Canada, wished to set some examples of the rebels, even though the evidence in the case was not clear. Matthews and Samuel Lount were hanged in the courtyard of the new King Street Gaol on April 12, 1838. Joseph Sheard was the foreman for the jail and was expected to share in the work of building the scaffold. However, he refused saying, 'I'll not put a hand to it,' said he; 'Lount and Matthews have done nothing that I might not have done myself, and I'll never help build a gallows to hang them."

He was refused a Christian burial in St. James Cemetery (Toronto) and was instead interred in Toronto's Potter Field (re-developed later into Yorkville, Toronto).

In 1848 Captain Matthews was pardoned and his property was relinquished by the government.

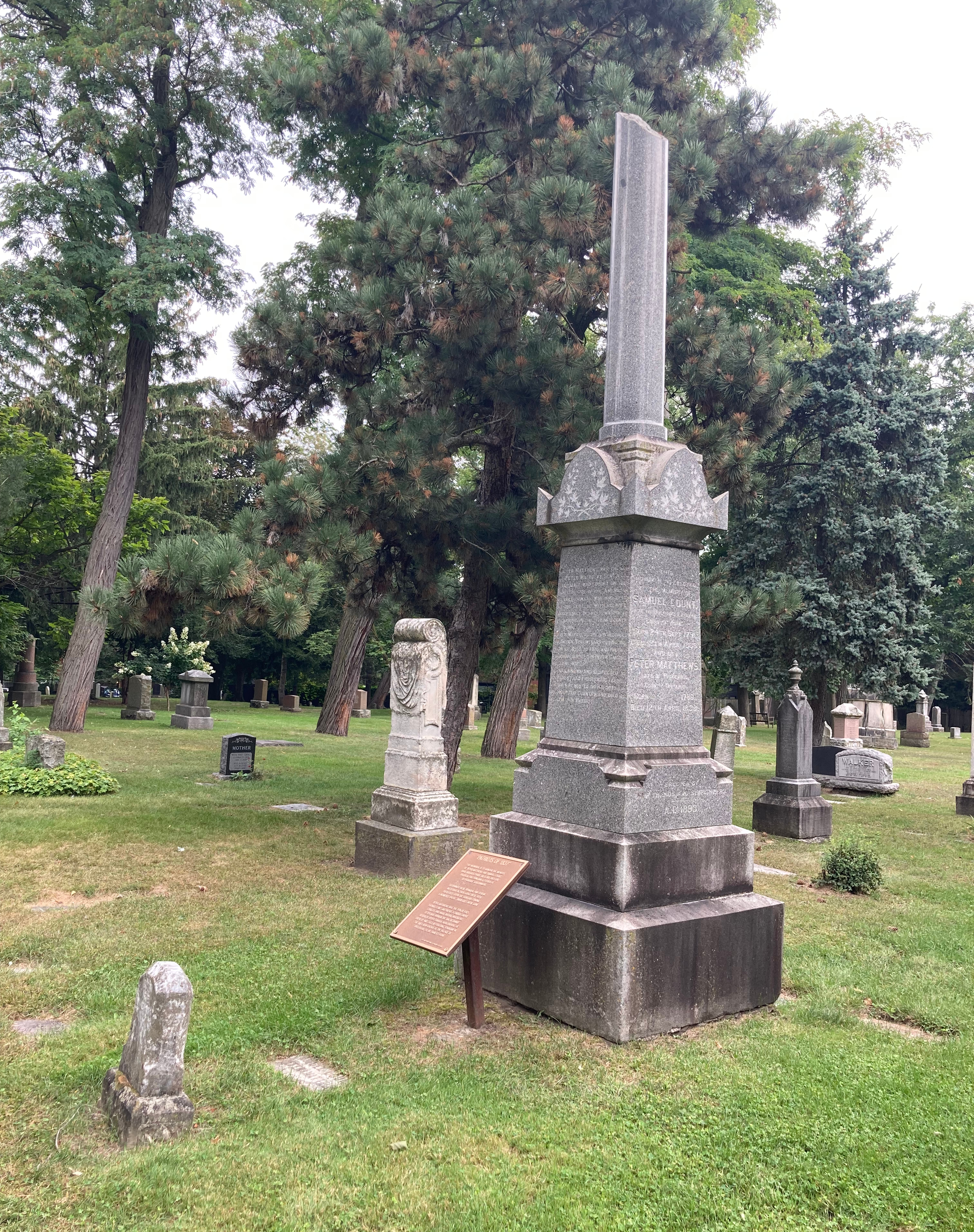
Graves of Matthews and Lount at Toronto Necropolis

On June 28, 1893, a monument to patriots Captains Peter Matthews and Samuel Lount was unveiled in the Necropolis Cemetery in Toronto. The monument's dedication was led by Canadian Member of Parliament Sir James David Edgar.

In the 1930s a Memorial Arch was placed at the end of the Honeymoon Bridge in Niagara Falls which commemorated the arrival of United Empire Loyalists and those that participated in the Upper Canada Rebellion, included reliefs of Captains Lount and Matthews designed by Emanuel Hahn. These reliefs are now held by the Mackenzie House.

In 1992 the town of Pickering unveiled a plaque for Captain Matthews which read as follows:

Peter Matthews farmed the lands immediately northeast of here in the early nineteenth century. On December 2, 1837, neighbours asked him to lead men from the area to join an uprising against the government in Toronto planned by William Lyon Mackenzie. Matthews supported democratic reforms, was popular in his community, and had served in the War of 1812. He agreed to the request and played a leading role in the confused events of the Rebellion of 1837. When the rebellion failed, Matthews was captured by government militia. Authorities decided to make an example of Matthews and another prominent rebel, Samuel Lount. Convicted of treason and publicly hanged they became martyrs of the rebellion whose memory would be invoked by reformers for generations to come.

In 2012, as part of the 175th anniversary of the executions of Matthews and Lount, a Lount and Matthews Commemoration Committee was formed to raise public awareness.

Captain Matthews had eight children. His son Hiram, who marched with him in the rebellion and was also arrested, was pardoned and remained in Canada (died in Pickering in 1847). His other son, Thomas Matthews, married a Margaret Spencer and migrated to the United States, settling in Worth Township, Michigan. Their farm, believed to have been designed based on Matthews' farm in Pickering, was granted landmark status by the US National Register of Historic Places.
