= W.R. Roach Cannery Warehouse and Office Building =

- U.S. National Register of Historic Places
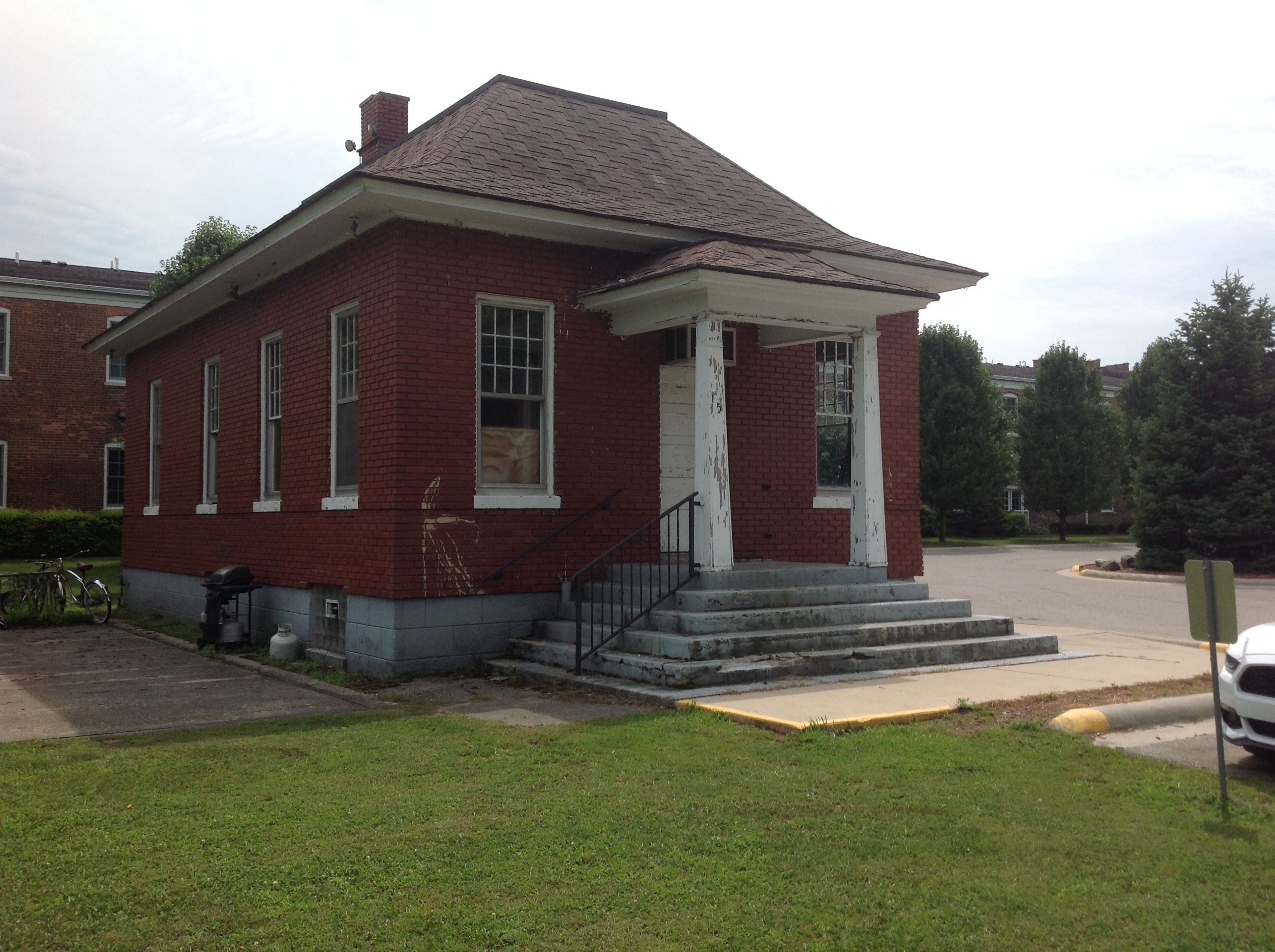

- Location within Michigan Location within the United States
- Interactive map
- Location: 89 E. Sanborn, Croswell, Michigan
- Coordinates: 43°16′21″N 82°36′54″W
- Area: 3.7 acres (1.5 ha)
- Built: 1917
- Built by: Jauris Landon and W. F. Dennison
- Architectural style: Industrial loft warehouse
- NRHP reference No.: 05000717
- Added to NRHP: July 20, 2005

The W.R. Roach Cannery Warehouse and Office Building is an industrial structure located at 89 East Sanborn in Croswell, Michigan. It was listed on the National Register of Historic Places in 2005, and now contains apartments, known as Cannery Village.

== History ==
William R. Roach owned a pea-canning factory in Hart, Michigan. In 1915, he planted an experimental crop north of Lexington, Michigan to determine if the soil was suitable. The crop thrived, and in 1917 Roach proposed an agreement to the Croswell Improvement Association to build a canning factory there. The Improvement Association agreed, money was raised, and work on the foundation of the building began in November 1917. Work ceased during the winter, and was resumed in March 1918. The factory was completed in mid-May. Construction on the adjoining warehouse began in 1918 and ended the next year.

At the same time that construction was being completed, Roach dismantled his factory in Hart and moved the equipment to the new plant. Production of canned peas was begun even before the exterior of the plant was finalized. The cannery provided significant employment for the surrounding community. During World War I and World War II, production shifted to supporting the armed forces, with pork and beans being a significant part of the output. William R. Roach retired in the early 1930s, and the cannery business was reorganized and sold to Compton Foods.

Stokely Van Camp Foods purchased the plant in 1946, and operated it until its closure in 1978. The factory was demolished in stages, and was completely gone in 1994. The warehouse was used by a local company until 1999. In 2004, the warehouse was refurbished into 41 apartments, known as Cannery Village.

== Description ==
The original complex constructed by W.R. Roach included a cannery itself, a warehouse, an office building and a vinery building. Both the vinery building and the cannery have been demolished, leaving the warehouse and office building.

The office building is a single story red brick structure with a hip roof and full basement. The building measures 24 feet by 44 feet. Both the roof eaves and the lower courses of brick flare slightly. The interior of the office building contains a large general office space and a private office with a bathroom behind. The lower level contains another bathroom, a kitchen, an eating area and another office.

The warehouses is a two-story brick structure measuring 312 feet by 84 feet on a poured concrete foundation with extends upward approximately 24 inches above ground level. Window openings measure 44 inches by 73 inches. The interior has been refurbished into 41 apartments, with four one-bedroom and thirteen two-bedroom apartments on the first floor and two three-bedroom and twenty-two two bedroom apartments on the second.
