= Arnold Field =

Arnold Field may refer to:

- Arnold Field (Sonoma, California), a ballpark; see Sonoma Stompers
- Arnold Field (Michigan), an airport in Croswell, Michigan, United States (FAA: 55G)
- Arnold Field (Tennessee), an airport in Halls, Tennessee, United States (FAA: M31)
