= Croswell-Lexington High School =

Location
- 5461 East Peck Road; Croswell, Michigan 48422; United States
- 43°15′59″N 82°36′04″W

Information
- Funding type: Public
- Opened: 1967
- School district: Croswell-Lexington Community Schools
- Principal: Lisa Burns
- Faculty: 26.95 (FTE)
- Grades: 9-12
- Enrollment: 579 (2022–23)
- Student to teacher ratio: 21.48
- Classrooms: 28
- Colors: Royal blue and white
- Nickname: Pioneers
- Website: www.croslex.org/our-schools/high-school/

Croswell-Lexington High School, commonly abbreviated to simply "Cros-Lex", is a public secondary school in Croswell, Michigan.

== Notable alumni ==
- Leah Falland (born 1992), American steeplechase runner
