= Harriet Gertrude Eddy =

American educator and librarian

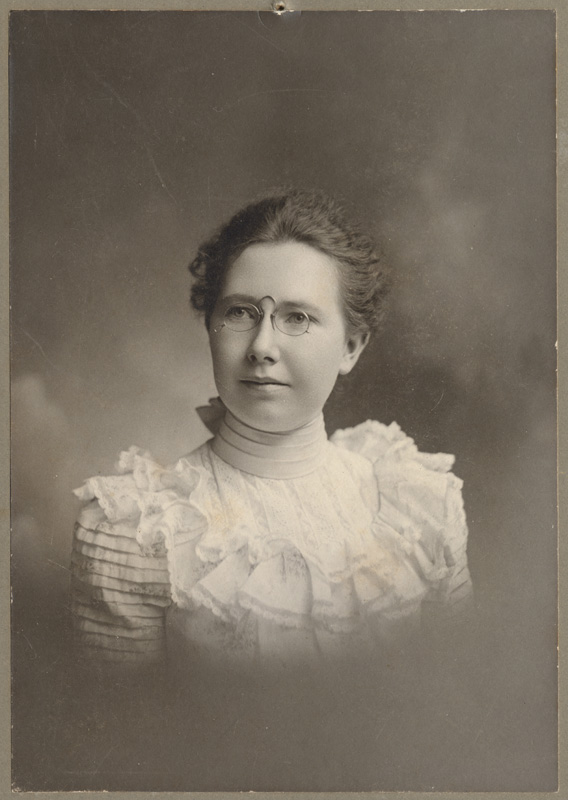
- Harriet G. Eddy as a young woman, from the California State Library.
- Born: March 1876; Lexington, Michigan
- Died: December 3, 1966 (aged 90); Napa, California
- Occupations: educator, librarian

Harriet Gertrude Eddy (March 1876 – December 3, 1966) was an American educator and librarian who influenced the management of libraries in the Soviet Union. She was inducted into the California Library Hall of Fame in 2014, for her work on organizing forty Californian library systems.

== Early life ==
Harriet Gertrude Eddy was born in Lexington, Michigan, the daughter of George Washington Eddy and Louise Mackenzie Eddy. She earned a bachelor's degree and a teaching certificate in 1896 at Albion College and pursued further studies at the University of Chicago.

== Career ==
Eddy taught school in Helena, Montana, for a few years, and was a high school principal in Elk Grove, California, from 1906 to 1909. She began a library at the school to support its claim for accreditation. The Elk Grove Library became part of the Sacramento County Library system in 1908, "the first county branch of a library in the state of California". Eddy went to work on creating more rural libraries with the California State Librarian, from 1909 to 1918, traveling the state to establish county libraries in forty counties. She described her work in a memoir, County Free Library Organizing in California, 1909–1918 (1955).

In 1918 she began teaching in the University of California Agricultural Extension, touring the state speaking to community groups and local government bodies as state leader of home demonstration agents. During sabbaticals, she traveled to the Soviet Union, Eastern Europe, and Cuba, to study schools and libraries, in the 1920s and 1930s. She met with Lenin's wife, Nadezhda Krupskaya, in this work, and with Genrietta K. Abele-Derman (1882–1954), first director of the Moscow Library Institute. She also hosted scholars from the Soviet Union on their visits to California.

Eddy was active in the California Library Association, and the Women's International League for Peace and Freedom. She retired from the University Extension work in 1941. In retirement, she was active in the Peninsula Council of the American-Soviet Friendship, the World Peace Congress, and the National Peace Conference. In 1952, her passport application was denied, from concern about her Soviet contacts and activities abroad.

In 2014, Eddy was posthumously inducted into the California Library Hall of Fame.

== Personal life ==
Eddy lived for many years with her older sister, Myrta Newman, who joined in her travels. She wrote an unpublished memoir of their times together, titled The Rover Girls. Eddy died in 1966, aged 90 years, in Napa, California. Her papers are archived in the California State Library. There is a Harriet G. Eddy Middle School in Elk Grove, named in her memory.
