= Sanilhac =

Sanilhac may refer to the following places in France:

- Sanilhac, Ardèche, a commune in the Ardèche department
- Sanilhac, Dordogne, a commune in the Dordogne department
- Sanilhac-Sagriès, a commune in the Gard department

== See also ==
- Sanilac (disambiguation)
