= Charles H. Moore–Albert E. Sleeper House =

- U.S. National Register of Historic Places
- Michigan State Historic Site
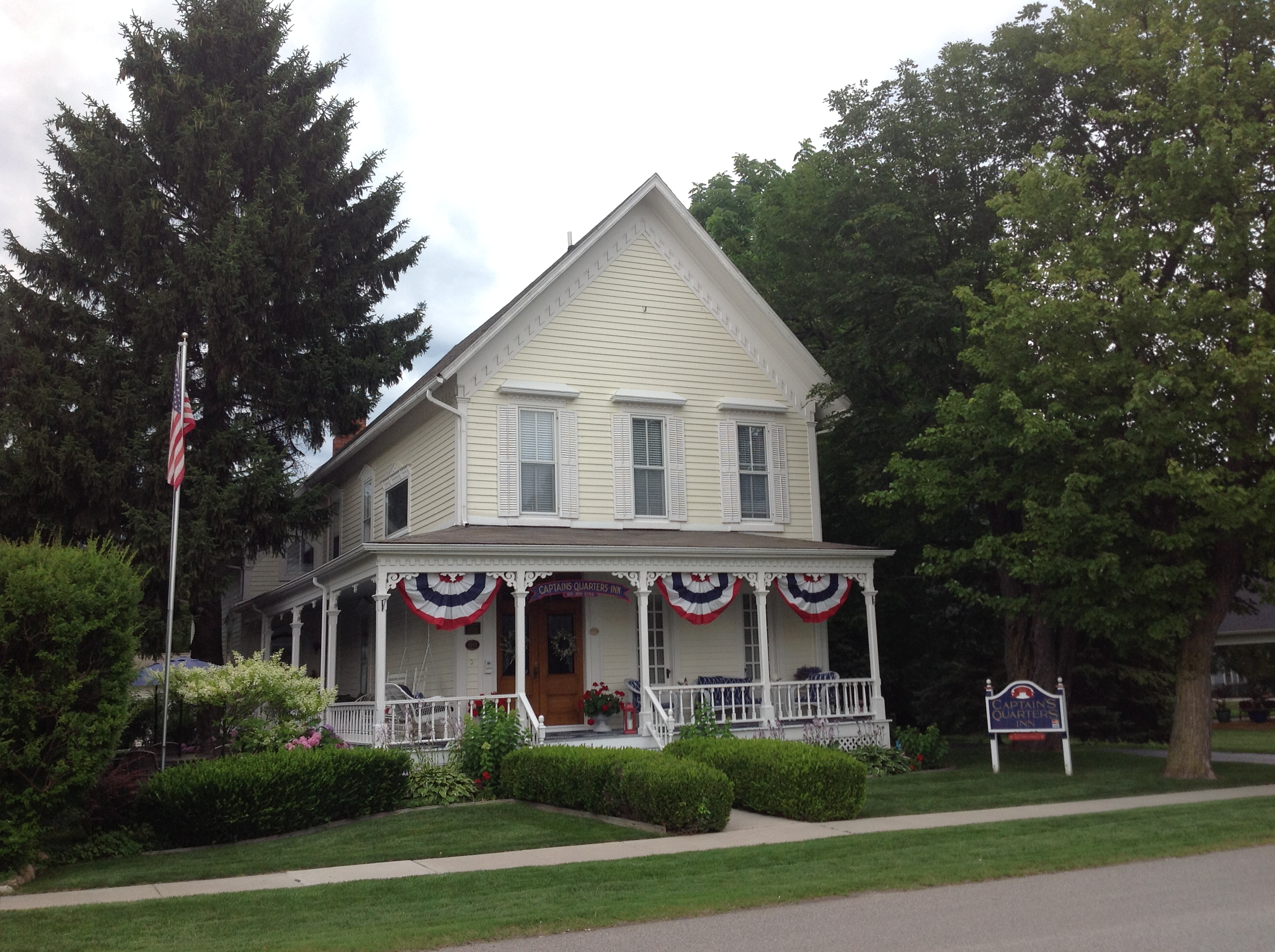

- Location within Michigan Location within the United States
- Interactive map
- Location: 7277 Simons St., Lexington, Michigan
- Coordinates: 43°16′10″N 82°31′50″W
- Area: less than one acre
- Built: c. 1860
- Architectural style: Vernacular Gothic Revival
- NRHP reference No.: 85000064
- Added to NRHP: January 11, 1985

The Charles H. Moore–Albert E. Sleeper House was built as a private house located, at 7277 Simons Street in Lexington, Michigan, and was the residence and later summer home of Michigan governor Albert E. Sleeper. It was listed on the National Register of Historic Places in 1985. The house is now a bed and breakfast, known as the Captain's Quarters Inn.

== History ==
Charles H. Moore was born in 1824 in Bath, New Hampshire. He married Sophia Hodges in 1848, and moved to Ohio in 1850. By 1854, the couple had resettled in Lexington and purchased a farm; in addition, Charles performed carpentry work in the area. The move proved prosperous, and in 1856 the couple purchased three lots in Lexington where this house now stands. They built this house in about 1860. Charles Moore was active in the village, entering into business with J.L. Woods and Company, a general merchandising firm, and serving as a member of the local volunteer fire department and as a Trustee on the Village Council.

In 1901, Moore's youngest daughter, Mary, married Albert E. Sleeper. Sleeper was born in Bradford, Vermont, in 1862, and moved to Lexington in 1884. He worked as a merchant, and then founded a series of local banks in Yale, Bad Axe, Marlette, Ubly, Applegate, and Lexington. By the 1890s, he started in politics, serving as Lexington Village President. After his marriage to Mary Moore, Sleeper was elected to the state legislature. He later served as state treasurer, and in 1916 was elected as Governor of Michigan, serving until 1920.

The Sleepers moved their permanent residence to Bad Axe in 1904, but maintained this house in Lexington as a summer residence until Albert Sleeper's death in 1934. The family sold the house soon afterward. The house was used as a single-family home until 1983, when it was refurbished as a bed and breakfast, known at that time as the "Governor's Inn." The bed and breakfast has been operated under a number of different innkeepers, and as of 2017 is operated as "A Captain's Quarters Inn."

== Description ==
The house is a two-story, wood-framed structure sheathed with clapboard. The massing and steeply pitched roof reflect a Vernacular Gothic Revival sensibility in the design of the original home. Later decorative elements of Queen Anne style were added to the house, including curved brackets and turned ornaments. The front facade is three bays wide with a double entry door in the left bay, and floor-to-ceiling window/doors in the center and right bays. The second story contains three, two-over-two double hung sash window units. A Queen Anne detailed porch spans the front and wraps to the side.

The interior of the house is simple in detailing, and contains a side stair and hall, front parlor, and back parlor (now a sun room) on the first floor. The second floor contains three bedrooms and a nursery (now a full bath).
