= Buel Township, Michigan =

- Township
- Location within the state of Michigan Buel Township, Michigan (the United States)
- Coordinates: 43°16′49″N 82°43′22″W
- Country: United States
- State: Michigan
- County: Sanilac

Area
  - Total: 37.7 sq mi (97.6 km^{2})
  - Land: 37.7 sq mi (97.6 km^{2})
  - Water: 0 sq mi (0.0 km^{2})
- Elevation: 768 ft (234 m)

Population (2020)
  - Total: 1,161
  - Density: 31/sq mi (11.9/km^{2})
- Time zone: UTC-5 (Eastern (EST))
  - Summer (DST): UTC-4 (EDT)
- ZIP codes: 48401 (Applegate), 48422 (Croswell), 48466 (Peck)
- FIPS code: 26-11540
- GNIS feature ID: 1625999
- Website: https://www.bueltownship.com/

Buel Township is a civil township of Sanilac County in the U.S. state of Michigan. As of the 2020 census, the township population was 1,161.

== Name ==
The township is named after Mary L. Buel, who operated a hotel and accepted shingles from sawmill workers as payment for meals.

== Communities ==
There are no incorporated municipalities in the township.

- Buel was first settled by Ezra Van Camp in 1852. A post office opened in January 1856. It closed in May 1871 and was reopened from November 1877 until July 1901. The township was named for a pioneer settler in the county.

The postal delivery areas of some other nearby communities serve the township:

- Applegate is a village to the northeast and the Applegate ZIP code 48401 serves the northwestern portion of the township.
- Croswell is a city to the east and the Croswell ZIP code 48422 serves most of the township.
- Peck is a village to the west and the Peck ZIP code 48466 serves an area in the western part of the township.

== Geography ==
According to the United States Census Bureau, the township has a total area of 37.7 square miles (98 km^{2}), all land.

== Demographics ==
Historical population
Census	Pop.	Note	%±
2000	1,237		—
2010	1,265		2.3%
2020	1,161		−8.2%

As of the census of 2000, there were 1,237 people, 453 households, and 356 families residing in the township. The population density was 32.8 inhabitants per square mile (12.7/km^{2}). There were 497 housing units at an average density of 13.2 per square mile (5.1/km^{2}). The racial makeup of the township was 96.12% White, 0.16% African American, 0.49% Native American, 0.57% from other races, and 2.67% from two or more races. Hispanic or Latino of any race were 2.10% of the population.

There were 453 households, out of which 33.1% had children under the age of 18 living with them, 67.1% were married couples living together, 8.4% had a female householder with no husband present, and 21.2% were non-families. 16.6% of all households were made up of individuals, and 7.5% had someone living alone who was 65 years of age or older. The average household size was 2.72 and the average family size was 3.06.

In the township the population was spread out, with 27.8% under the age of 18, 5.0% from 18 to 24, 28.4% from 25 to 44, 24.4% from 45 to 64, and 14.4% who were 65 years of age or older. The median age was 38 years. For every 100 females, there were 101.8 males. For every 100 females age 18 and over, there were 95.8 males.

The median income for a household in the township was $39,828, and the median income for a family was $41,563. Males had a median income of $33,571 versus $21,375 for females. The per capita income for the township was $17,158. About 9.3% of families and 10.6% of the population were below the poverty line, including 16.8% of those under age 18 and 8.6% of those age 65 or over.
