= John L. Fead House =

- U.S. National Register of Historic Places
- Michigan State Historic Site
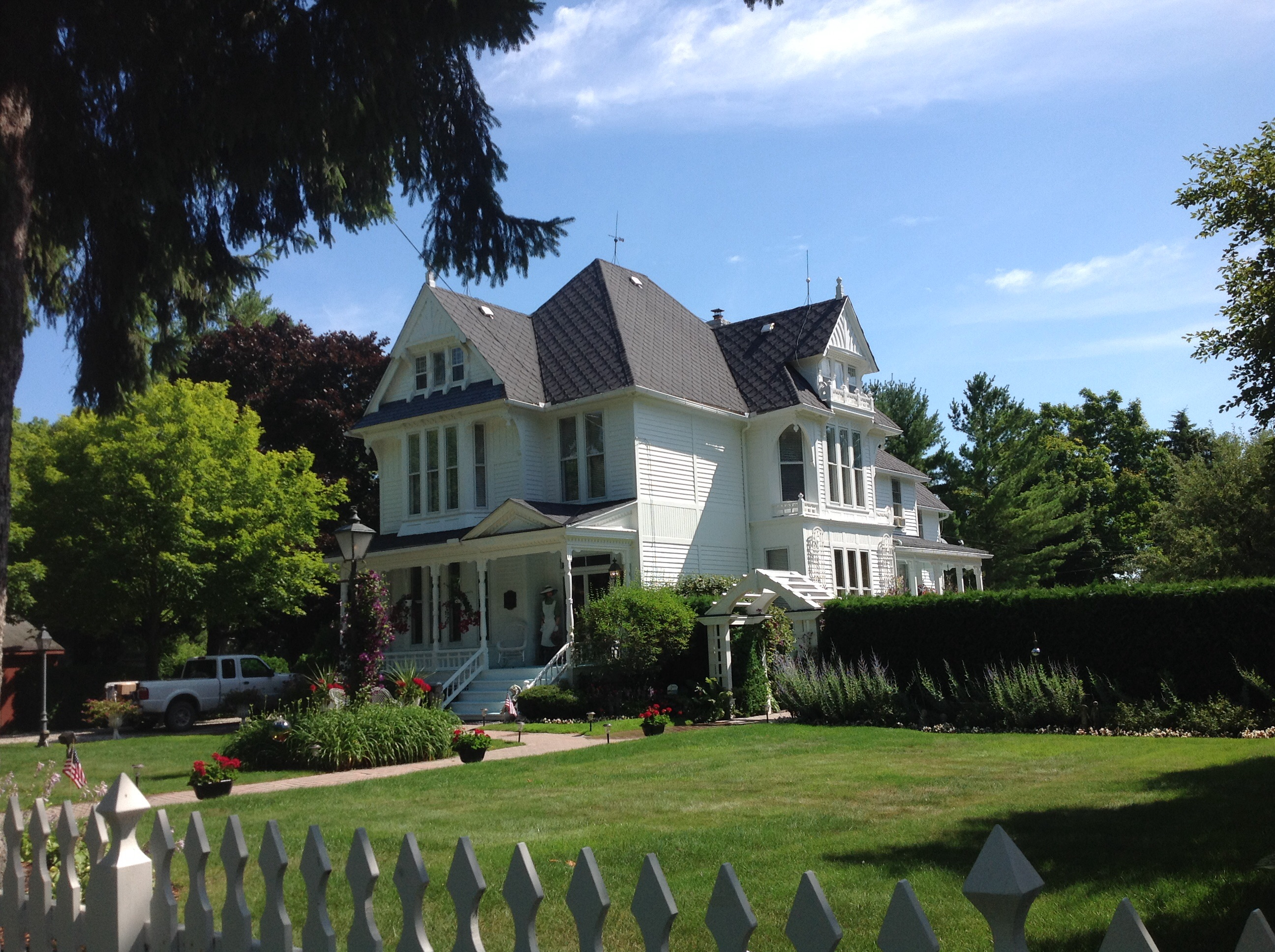

- Location within Michigan Location within the United States
- Interactive map
- Location: 5349 Washington St., Lexington, Michigan
- Coordinates: 43°16′18″N 82°31′45″W
- Area: 2 acres (0.81 ha)
- Built: 1890
- Architectural style: Queen Anne
- NRHP reference No.: 78001510
- Added to NRHP: October 5, 1978

The John L. Fead House is a private house located at 5349 Washington Street in Lexington, Michigan. It was listed on the National Register of Historic Places in 1978.

== History ==
John L. Fead was born in Bavaria, Germany in 1834. In 1852, he emigrated to America, and settled in Lexington, where an uncle had preceded him. Here he married Augusta Walthers, and established himself as a merchant. He eventually partnered with a local friend, Rudolph Andreae, to establish the first local woolen mill. By 1870, the pair had constructed a brick mill building in Lexington just south of the current location of the Fead House. Soon, Andreae sold his interest in the mill to Fead, and moved elsewhere. Over the next two decades, Lexington boomed with the growth of a shipping industry, both water-borne and overland when the railroad arrived in nearby Croswell, Michigan.

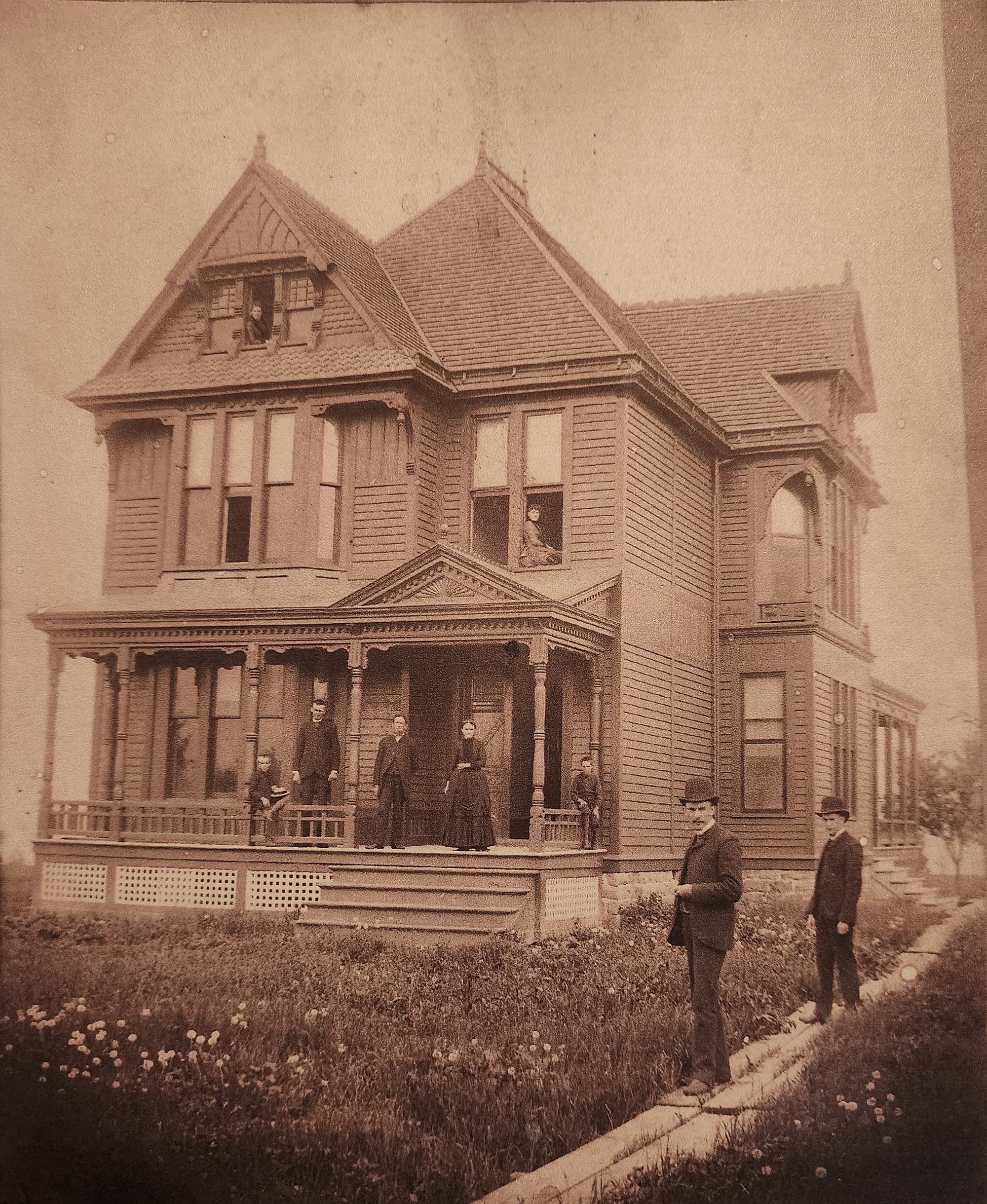
John L. Fead House, Lexington, Michigan circa 1900. Fead family posing with house.

By the early 1890s, Fead was wealthy enough to build this large and fashionable house on the shore of Lake Huron. He lived here with his wife Augusta and their nine children.

== Description ==
The house is a 2-1/2 story frame Queen Anne style house, covered with clapboard, with Eastlake detailing. The main facade has two major bays, the right one of which is narrower and recessed. The smaller bay contains a double entry door in a simple squared surround; the larger contains a bay window. A slant-roofed front porch, detailed with turned spindlework and crosswork, spans both bays. The second floor contains a similar bay window to that on the first floor, along with a double-hung sash. Another window is in the gable above. Board and batten siding is applied above the halfway point of the second floor windows.

The side elevations each feature a prominent bay window, and one has a side porch similar in appearance to the main front porch. The rear features a single-story addition, original to the house.
