= Brown City Community Schools =

School district in Michigan

Address
- 4349 Second Street Brown City, Sanilac County, Michigan, 48416; United States

District information
- Grades: PreKindergarten–12
- Superintendent: Neil Kohler
- Schools: 2
- Budget: $12,878,000 2022–2023 expenditures
- NCES District ID: 2607040

Students and staff
- Students: 696 (2024–2025)
- Teachers: 37.84 (on an FTE basis) (2024–2025)
- Staff: 98.16 FTE (2024–2025)
- Student–teacher ratio: 18.39 (2024–2025)
- District mascot: Green Devils

Other information
- Website: www.browncityschools.org

Brown City Community Schools is a public school district in the Thumb region of Michigan. In Sanilac County, it serves Brown City, Melvin, Maple Valley Township, and parts of the townships of Flynn and Speaker. In Lapeer County, it serves parts of the townships of Burnside and Goodland. In St. Clair County, it serves part of Lynn Township.

== History ==
The first school in the Brown City area was established in 1884. The first high school class graduated in 1895. On March 16, 1915, students evacuated their burning school. The building was a total loss and the school was rebuilt later that year on the same site.

The current high school opened on November 2, 1971. The previous high school became a school for grades three through six, and the Burnside, Melvin, and Odelville elementary schools were then closed. The Brown City Elementary, located between the old and new high schools, became an early elementary school.

In 2001, voters passed a bond issue passed to renovate the elementary schools, combining them into one building.

== Schools ==
Brown City schools share a campus on Second Street, northwest of downtown Brown City.

Schools in Brown City Community Schools district
School	Address	Notes
Brown City High School	4400 Second Street, Brown City	Grades 7–12
Brown City Elementary	4290 Second Street, Brown City	Grades PreK-6
