= Loop-Harrison Mansion =

- Joseph M. Loop House
- U.S. National Register of Historic Places
- Michigan State Historic Site
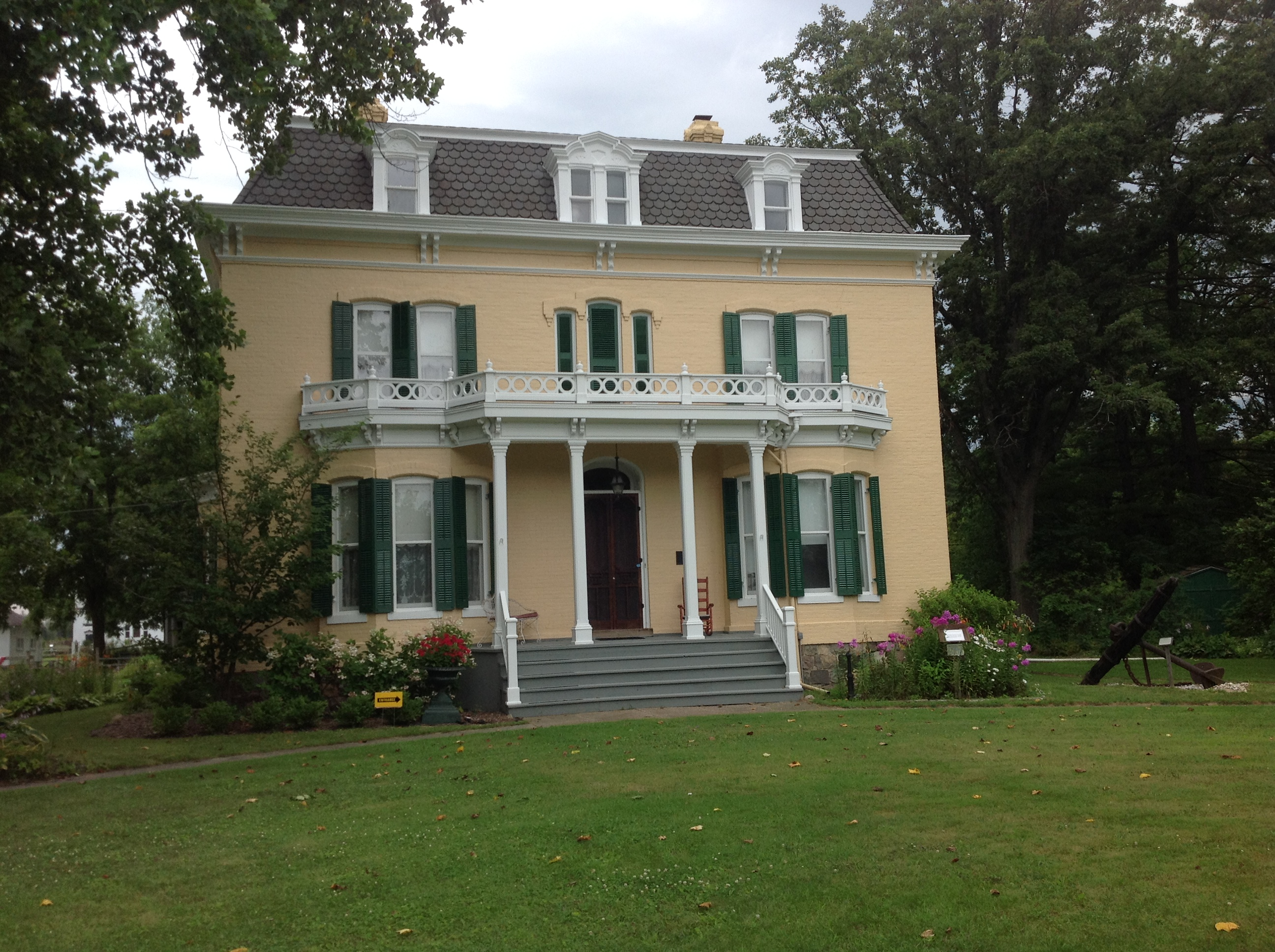

- Location within Michigan Location within the United States
- Interactive map
- Location: 228 S. Ridge, Port Sanilac, Michigan
- Coordinates: 43°25′28″N 82°32′38″W
- Area: 7.5 acres (3.0 ha)
- Built: 1872
- Architectural style: Second Empire
- NRHP reference No.: 72000654
- Added to NRHP: November 9, 1972

The Loop-Harrison Mansion, also known as the Joseph M. Loop House was built as a private house located at 228 South Ridge Street in Port Sanilac, Michigan. It now serves as part of the Sanilac County Historical Museum. The building was listed on the National Register of Historic Places in 1972.

== History ==
Joseph Miller Loop was born in Elmira, New York, in 1814, and lived there until 1933. He moved to New Orleans, Wisconsin, and Illinois before arriving in Michigan in 1843. Loop married his first wife, Caroline Barteau, some time just before 1840. Caroline died about five years later, and Loop married Jane Gardner Loop in 1846. By 1850, Loop was practicing medicine in Novi. The Loops moved to Port Sanilac in 1854, where Joseph opened a medical office. Loop attended medical school at the University of Michigan, and graduated in 1855. The Loops lived in a cabin until 1862, when they constructed a clapboard house.

Loop built this house in the 1870s for use as both his office and residence. Construction began in 1872, and took three years, with a total cost of $11,000. Joseph and Jane Loop lived in the house until their deaths, Jane in 1895 and Joseph in 1903. The house then passed to The Loop's daughter, Ada, and her husband Rev. Julius Harrison. They lived in the house with their two sons Stanley and Fred until their deaths, Ada in 1925 and Julius in 1933.

Ada's son Stanley was a Great Lakes shipping captain. In 1964, when Captain Stanley Harrison deeded the house and surrounding property to the Sanilac County Historical Society, to use as a museum. Stanley continued to live in the house until his death in 1977. The society restored the building, and continues to use it as a museum and it is open for tours.

== Description ==
The house is a 2-1/2 story brick Second Empire style house with a mansard roof. The house has two distinctive, classically detailed chimneys, reportedly constructed by an itinerant Irish mason who just happened to be in the area during construction. The main wing of the house measures approximately 40 feet by 50 feet, and the west wing approximately 24 feet by 44 feet. The interior contains nineteen rooms, including a doctor's office, library, and a third floor ballroom.
