= Arnold Field (Michigan) =

Airport in the United States

- IATA: none; ICAO: none; FAA LID: 55G

Summary
- Airport type: Public
- Owner: Robert Perry
- Serves: Croswell, Michigan
- Time zone: UTC−05:00 (-5)
  - Summer (DST): UTC−04:00 (-4)
- Elevation AMSL: 784 ft / 239 m
- Coordinates: 43°17′52″N 082°36′24″W
- Interactive map of Arnold Field

Runways
Direction	Length		Surface
Direction	ft	m	Surface
18/36	2,570	783	Turf

Statistics (2021)
- Aircraft operations: 200
- Based aircraft: 7
- Source: https://nfdc.faa.gov/nfdcApps/services/ajv5/airportDisplay.jsp?airportId=55g

Arnold Field (FAA LID: 55G) is a privately owned, public-use airport located two nautical miles (2.3 mi; 3.7 km) northeast of the central business district of Croswell, a city in Sanilac County, Michigan, United States.

== Facilities and aircraft ==
Arnold Field covers an area of 160 acres (65 ha) at an elevation of 784 feet (239 m) above mean sea level. It has one runway with a turf surface: 18/36 is 2,570 by 140 feet (783 by 43 m). Runway 7/25 was a turf crosswind runway that is no longer in use.

For the 12-month period ending December 31, 2021, the airport had 200 general aviation aircraft operations, an average of 17 per month. At that time there were 7 aircraft based at this airport: 6 single-engine airplanes and 1 ultralight.

== Accidents and incidents ==
- On September 3, 2021, a Mooney M20K was destroyed when it impacted a pole, trees, and terrain after takeoff from the Arnold Field Airport. The pilot reported the engine's turbocharger did not kick in and acceleration was slow as he started the takeoff roll, but he disregarded the issue because he was on a grass field and near max gross weight. The plane continued to underperform after going airborne, and while the pilot cleared trees nearby, he couldn't clear the power lines. The pilot tried aiming for a sliver in the tree line to land, but the right wing clipped a phone pole and the aircraft came down. The probable cause of the accident was found to be the pilot's failure to abort the takeoff.

== See also ==
- List of airports in Michigan
