= Cadillac House =

- U.S. National Register of Historic Places
- Cadillac House, 2026

- Location within Michigan Location within the United States
- Interactive map
- Location: 5502 Main St., Lexington, Michigan
- Coordinates: 43°16′06″N 82°31′57″W
- Built: 1860
- Architectural style: Italianate
- NRHP reference No.: 100003216
- Added to NRHP: December 4, 2018

The Cadillac House is a hotel and restaurant located at 5502 Main Street in Lexington, Michigan. It was listed on the National Register of Historic Places in 2018.

== History ==
The village of Lexington was founded in about 1835. By the 1850s, it was a bustling port town, and new and larger accommodations were needed. In 1859, construction was started on the Cadillac House; although the history is murky, the first owner was likely Jeremiah Jenks, a Lexington local. The hotel opened on July 4, 1860. The hotel continued to be popular throughout the 19th century, first with people connected to the lumber and shipping trade, and then as a resort location. As the beginning of the 20th century came, industry in Lexington was largely gone, and the town relied on the tourist trade. By 1910, the Cadillac House was a seasonal hotel, open only in the warmer months. By 1940, the hotel was owned by PJ Rice, who renamed it the "Rice-Cadillac Hotel."

However, by the late 1950s, the resort trade in Lexington was in decline, as the automobile changed people's vacation and travel habits. Renting rooms at the Cadillac was discontinued in 1954 as the owners concentrated on the bar and restaurant. This business remained popular, and the Cadillac House was remodeled in the 1970s. In 2001, the Cadillac House was sold to Martin and Julia O’Brien, who continued to operate it until they sold it in 2016. The new owners restored the building to its original appearance, and reopened both the hotel and restaurant in 2018.

== Description ==
The Cadillac House is a three-story, wood-framed Italianate structure. A two-story wing extends to the rear, with an adjacent one-story addition. The building is covered with clapboard siding trimmed with wood, A projecting bracketed cornice supports the eaves. A one-story porch runs across the entire front elevation, supported by square columns. The porch shelters a center entry door flanked by sidelights, with a transom above. To either side of the center door are French-style doors with glass transoms above and windows to the side. The roof of the porch serves as a balcony at the second floor level; the balcony is accessed by three doors separated by windows. There are five windows on the third floor. The windows in the upper stories are six-over-six double-hung units. The flat roof is topped by four brick chimneys and a windowed cupola.

On the interior, the first-floor houses a public restaurant and bar as well as the hotel lobby and a central stair. The upper floors contain a central corridor with hotel rooms on each side. There are twelve rooms on each floor.
