= Moore Public Library (Lexington, Michigan) =

- John Divine Law Office–Moore Public Library
- U.S. National Register of Historic Places
- Michigan State Historic Site
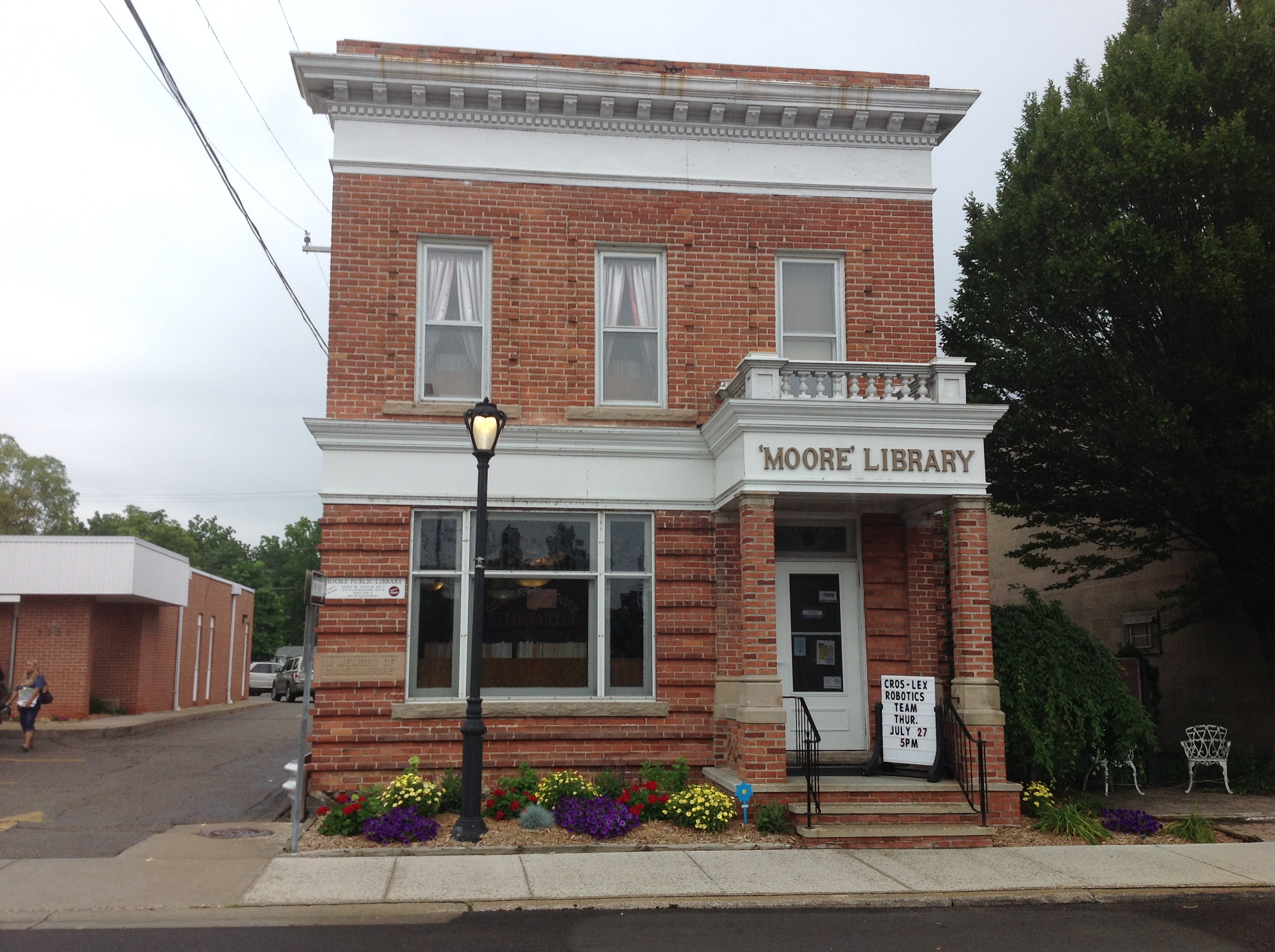

- Location within Michigan Location within the United States
- Interactive map
- Location: 7239 Huron Ave., Lexington, Michigan
- Coordinates: 43°16′6″N 82°31′57″W
- Area: less than one acre
- Built: c. 1875
- Architectural style: Classical Revival, Vernacular Classical
- NRHP reference No.: 85000167
- Added to NRHP: January 31, 1985

The Moore Public Library is a library building located at 7239 Huron Avenue Lexington, Michigan. The building was formerly a professional office, and was listed on the National Register of Historic Places in 1985.

== History ==
John Divine was born in 1823, and by 1850 had moved to Lexington and married Mary Ann Francis. Soon after, he opened a law office, the first in Sanilac County. Divine served in the state legislature in 1855 and 1856, and in 1859 took on a partner in his law firm, W.S. Mills. Mills left after two years, and Divine soon took another partner, L.L. Wixson. By the mid-1870s, Divine was successful enough to build his own office in Lexington. The building likely housed a store at ground level, with Divine's law offices on the second floor. Divine ran his law practice out of this building until his death in 1892, after which ownership of the building passed to Judge and local resident Watson Beach.

In 1902, the building was purchased by Mary, Ella, and Emily Moore, the daughters of Charles H. Moore, who had settled in Lexington in 1854. The women refurbished the building into a public library and meeting hall, naming it after their father. The sisters also gave the library $2500 with which to start an endowment fund, and deeded the library to the village of Lexington in 1904. The building continues to serve as a library.

== Description ==
The Moore Public Library is a two-story, three-bay brick structure. Although the original structure was likely Italianate in style, the refurbishment by the Moore sisters included the construction of a new facade in a vernacular neoclassical style. This new facade has a rusticated base at the first floor level, and an entry door in the right-hand bay with a brick porch sheltering it. A triple window spans the center and left bay. A wide metal frieze and cornice separates the first and second floors, and wraps around the side of the building. The second floor contains three tall, one-over-one, double hung sash windows.

The interior of the building reflects the neoclassical design used to remodel the structure at the turn of the century. The first floor contains a small entry foyer near the front stairway, a large room to the front and a slightly smaller rear room. The walls are finished with tongue-and-groove wainscoting below and plaster on the upper portion. Windows have wood surrounds with molded sides and Classical top-pieces. A stained glass window in the stairwell contains a half-circle top piece and elaborate woodwork surrounds. The second floor contains an open hall flanked by the stairwell, a small room that is now a kitchen, and another small room in the front.
