= Thomas and Margaret Spencer Matthews Farm =

- U.S. National Register of Historic Places
- U.S. Historic district
- Michigan State Historic Site
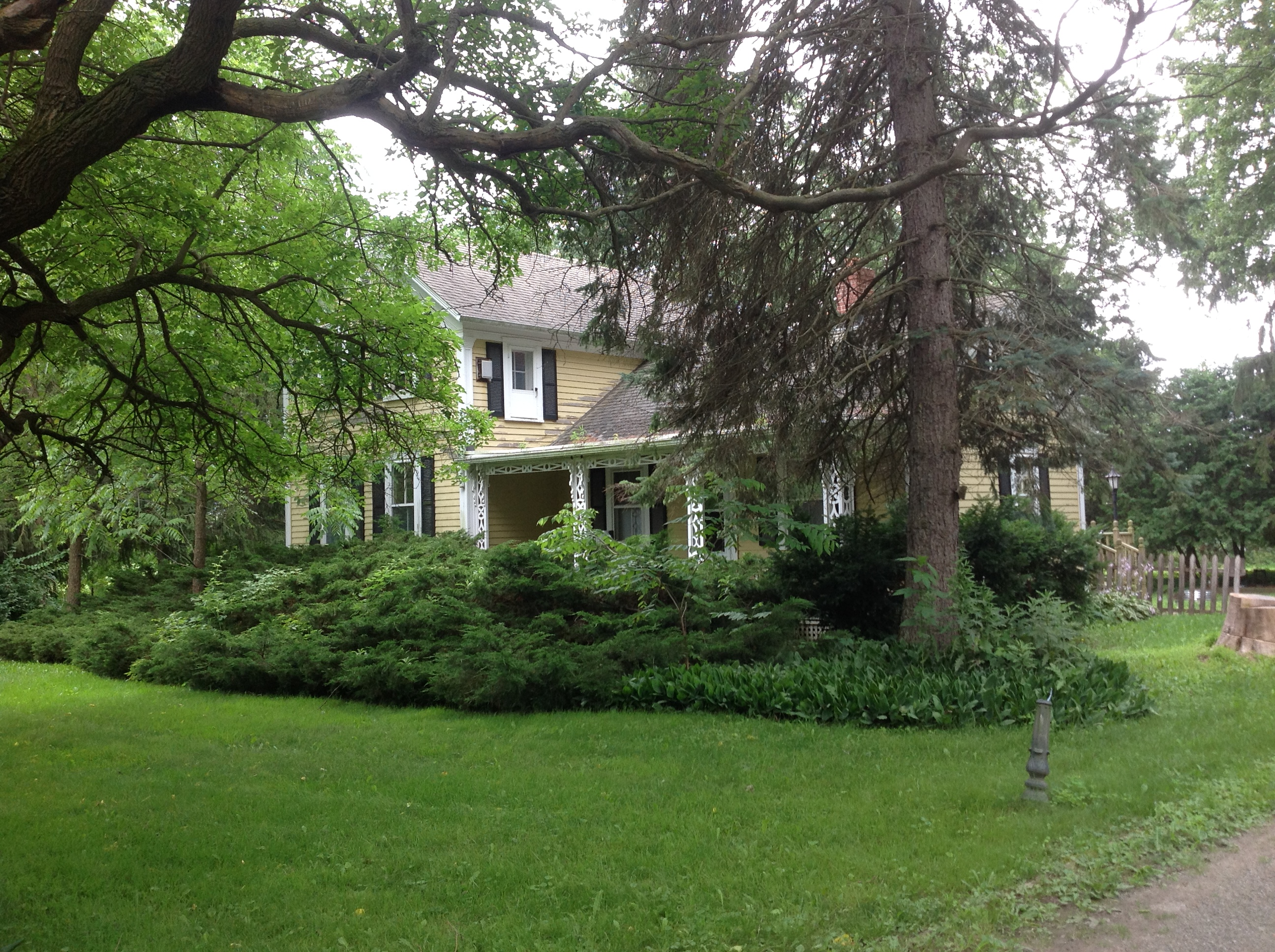

- Location within Michigan Location within the United States
- Interactive map
- Location: 5916 E. Gardner Line Rd., Amadore, Michigan
- Coordinates: 43°12′28″N 82°34′48″W
- Area: 10 acres (4.0 ha)
- Built: 1852
- Architectural style: Gable-front-and-wing
- NRHP reference No.: 95000371
- Added to NRHP: April 7, 1995

The Thomas and Margaret Spencer Matthews Farm is a farm located at 5916 East Gardner Line Road near Amadore, Michigan. It was listed on the National Register of Historic Places in 1995.

== History ==
A number of farm families migrated from Ontario, Canada to this region of Michigan in the mid-1800s. Among them were Thomas and Margaret Spencer Matthews, who arrived at this location in 1848. Thomas was born in 1822, and his father, Peter, had been executed for taking part in the Rebellions of 1837–1838 against the British government. The couple built this farmhouse in 1852, as well as the nearby hay barn. They raised seven children, and continued farming until Thomas's death in 1893.
