= Port Sanilac Light =

Lighthouse in Michigan, United States

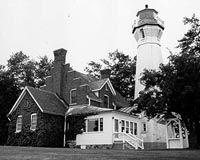
- Location: Port Sanilac, Michigan
- Coordinates: 43°25′44″N 82°32′24″W

Tower
- Constructed: 1886
- Foundation: dressed stone masonry/timber
- Construction: Brick
- Automated: 1928
- Height: 59 feet (18 m)
- Shape: Octagonal hourglass
- Markings: White with red roof
- Heritage: National Register of Historic Places listed place

Light
- First lit: 1886
- Focal height: 69 feet (21 m)
- Lens: Fourth order Fresnel lens
- Range: 16 nautical miles (30 km; 18 mi)
- Characteristic: Fl W 2.5 sec.
- Port Sanilac Light Station
- U.S. National Register of Historic Places
- Location: Lake St., Port Sanilac, Michigan
- Area: 0.3 acres (0.12 ha)
- MPS: U.S. Coast Guard Lighthouses and Light Stations on the Great Lakes TR
- NRHP reference No.: 84001842
- Added to NRHP: July 19, 1984

Port Sanilac Light is a United States Coast Guard lighthouse located on Point Sanilac, near Port Sanilac on the eastern side of Michigan's Thumb. It is an automated and active aid to navigation on Lake Huron.

== History ==
Characterized by shallow water and sandbanks, the 75-mile (121 km) stretch of coastline between the Fort Gratiot Light and Pointe aux Barques Light is a hazard to navigation. Even after the establishment of the Sand Beach Harbor of Refuge Light in 1875, 30 miles (48 km) of coast line still remained completely unlit.

Eighteen years after the first attempts to get congressional funding, the station was established and first lit in 1886. This Lake Huron lighthouse is 30 miles (48 km) north of the Fort Gratiot Lighthouse (Michigan's oldest) in Port Huron, Michigan.

The Port Sanilac Light's foundation consists of dressed stone and timber. The octagon-hourglass-shaped tower (near its top) is made of tiered and reverse stair-stepped brick. It is 14 feet (4.3 m) in diameter at its base, and tapers vertically to 9 feet (2.7 m) diameter below the gallery. Eschewing the usual corbels, a dozen courses of bricks create the gallery support, with four indentations for windows, creating a watch room for the four points of the compass. The lighthouse was built at a cost of $20,000. The placement and the unique shape were dictated by and created because of budgetary constraints (Congress appropriated only half the money requested). Designed by Eleventh District Engineer Captain Charles E. L. B. Davis, the design has been called "both unique and architecturally significant in its elegance." The tower is white with a red roof.

This lighthouse shares its design with, Ile Aux Galets, also known as Skilligallee Island Light, on Lake Michigan.

The Port Sanilac Light tower is capped with a cast iron lantern room, which still houses a fourth order Fresnel lens manufactured by Barbier and Fenestre of Paris. The lens and its brass reflector on one segment (the reflector blocked the lens on the landward side) send the light out in a 300 degree arc across the lake. Its focal plane is 69 feet (21 m) shines a beam of light visible for up to 16 nautical miles (30 km; 18 mi) in all directions, thus closing most of the 30 miles (48 km)-gap mentioned above. The light sits atop high ground at the head of a small bay. This is one of only 70 such Fresnel lenses that are still operational in the United States, sixteen of which are use on the Great Lakes of which eight are in Michigan.

Port Sanilac Light Station — Lake St. is a registered site on the National Register of Historic Places, being added on August 19, 1984 as listed site #84001842. Name of Listing: PORT SANILAC LIGHT STATION (U.S. COAST GUARD/GREAT LAKES TR).

The Port Sanilac Light complex currently consists of five historic structures. In addition to the light tower and ornate brick Lighthouse keeper's residence, the brick oil house, wooden outhouse, and well also survive. The well is covered by a safety platform of wooden planks.

Because of its unique and picturesque form and location, it is often the subject of photographs, and even of needlepoint illustrations. Drawings have also been produced, as have postcards.

The original fourth order Fresnel lens is still operative, being one of only 70 such lenses that remain operational in the United States; sixteen of them are use on the Great Lakes, of which eight are in Michigan.

The lighthouse, including the keeper's house, is for sale.

== Getting there ==
The lighthouse is private property; access around it is prohibited. You can walk down toward the beach and breakwater to get a view of the lighthouse and harbor.

From M-25 in Port Sanilac, Michigan, turn east onto Cherry Street, taking it to the Lake Huron shore. Public parking is at the terminus of Cherry Street, directly south of the light. The breakwater "is a nice place from which the lighthouse can be photographed."

== See also ==
- Lighthouses in the United States
