= Lexington Township, Michigan =

- Township
- Location within the state of Michigan Lexington Township, Michigan (the United States)
- Coordinates: 43°17′23″N 82°33′40″W
- Country: United States
- State: Michigan
- County: Sanilac

Area
  - Total: 36.2 sq mi (93.8 km^{2})
  - Land: 36.2 sq mi (93.8 km^{2})
  - Water: 0 sq mi (0.0 km^{2})
- Elevation: 774 ft (236 m)

Population (2020)
  - Total: 3,485
  - Density: 96/sq mi (37.1/km^{2})
- Time zone: UTC-5 (Eastern (EST))
  - Summer (DST): UTC-4 (EDT)
- ZIP code: 48450
- Area code: 810
- FIPS code: 26-47300
- GNIS feature ID: 1626612
- Website: https://www.lexingtontownship.org/

Lexington Township is a civil township of Sanilac County in the U.S. state of Michigan. The population was 3,485 at the 2020 census.

== Geography ==
According to the United States Census Bureau, the township has a total area of 36.2 square miles (94 km^{2}), all land.

=== Communities ===
- Croswell is a city located in the southwest of the township. Originally established in 1845 as Black River, then as Davisville, the town of Croswell politically separated from the township by incorporating as a city in 1881.
- Lexington is a village located in the southeast of the township.

== Demographics ==
Historical population
| Census | Pop. | Note | %± |
|---|---|---|---|
| 2000 | 3,688 | | — |
| 2010 | 3,658 | | −0.8% |
| 2020 | 3,485 | | −4.7% |

As of the census of 2000, there were 3,688 people, 1,555 households, and 1,044 families residing in the township. The population density was 101.8 inhabitants per square mile (39.3/km^{2}). There were 2,320 housing units at an average density of 64.1 per square mile (24.7/km^{2}). The racial makeup of the township was 98.24% White, 0.05% African American, 0.30% Native American, 0.24% Asian, 0.68% from other races, and 0.49% from two or more races. Hispanic or Latino of any race were 2.09% of the population.

There were 1,555 households, out of which 26.9% had children under the age of 18 living with them, 56.5% were married couples living together, 7.1% had a female householder with no husband present, and 32.8% were non-families. 28.2% of all households were made up of individuals, and 13.6% had someone living alone who was 65 years of age or older. The average household size was 2.36 and the average family size was 2.89.

In the township the population was spread out, with 23.3% under the age of 18, 6.7% from 18 to 24, 25.0% from 25 to 44, 25.9% from 45 to 64, and 19.1% who were 65 years of age or older. The median age was 42 years. For every 100 females, there were 94.2 males. For every 100 females age 18 and over, there were 89.9 males.

The median income for a household in the township was $39,241, and the median income for a family was $47,054. Males had a median income of $39,321 versus $24,009 for females. The per capita income for the township was $22,027. About 4.2% of families and 5.6% of the population were below the poverty line, including 6.3% of those under age 18 and 4.4% of those age 65 or over.
