= Port Sanilac Masonic and Town Hall =

- U.S. National Register of Historic Places
- Michigan State Historic Site
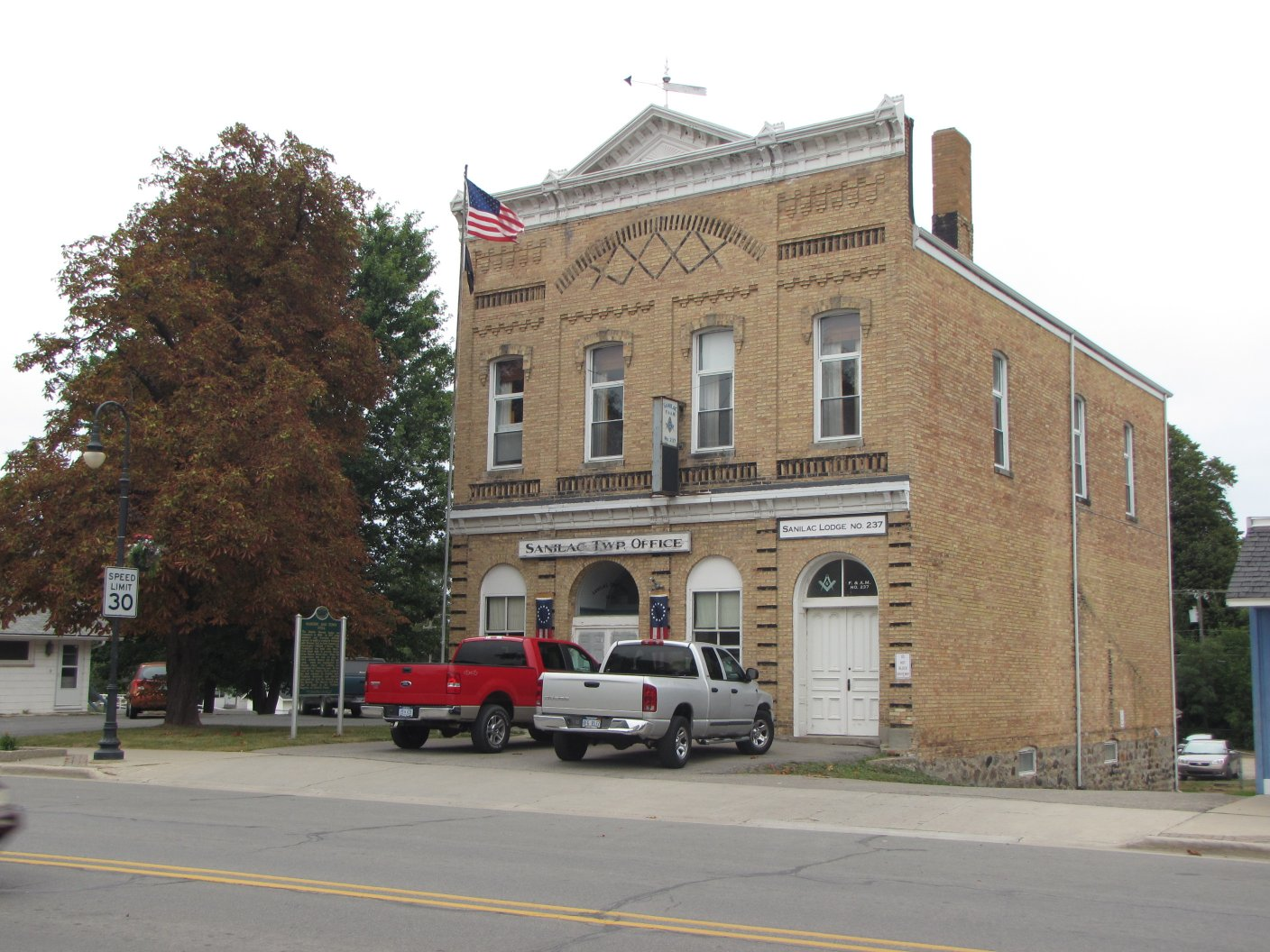

- Location within Michigan Location within the United States
- Interactive map
- Location: 20 N. Ridge St., Port Sanilac, Michigan
- Coordinates: 43°25′53″N 82°32′31″W
- Area: less than one acre
- Built: 1884
- Architectural style: Italianate
- NRHP reference No.: 96000808
- Added to NRHP: July 25, 1996

The Masonic and Town Hall, located at 20 North Ridge Street in Port Sanilac, Michigan, was constructed as a Masonic Lodge constructed in 1884. It was listed on the National Register of Historic Places in 1996. Currently, no Masonic lodge meets in the building

== History ==
Port Sanilac was first settled in about 1840. In 1852, the first sawmill was established, and by 1866 Port Sanilac was a thriving village. Local Masons were meeting as early 1866, and in 1868, Sanilac Lodge No. 237 was organized with fifteen members. The Lodge met in rented quarters, and likely continued to do so through the early 1880s. In 1883, the Masons first began discussing the construction of a new Lodge building, and considered proposing a cooperative arrangement with the township that would let both parties share a single building. A member of the organization donated the land, and the Masons came to an agreement where the township would construct the foundation, and the Masons would construct the remainder of the building.

In early 1884, the Masons began advertising for bids for construction, and the cornerstone was dedicated in July. Construction was completed by July 1885.

== Description ==
The Port Sanilac Masonic and Town Hall is a rectangular, two-story red-orange brick building on a fieldstone foundation. It has a front gable roof, hidden by a false front topped with an iron cornice. The main facade is divided into four bays by vertical brick piers. The bays have a broad, round-head sections, two of which have windows, and two of which have double doors. One set of doors leads to the first floor township offices, and the second to the upstairs Masonic lodge. The second floor facade has segmental-arch-head windows with slightly projecting two-course high brick hoods, with the original windows being two-over-two units. Dark brown bricks accent the second story of the facade.
