= William Reuben Nims House =

- U.S. National Register of Historic Places
- Michigan State Historic Site
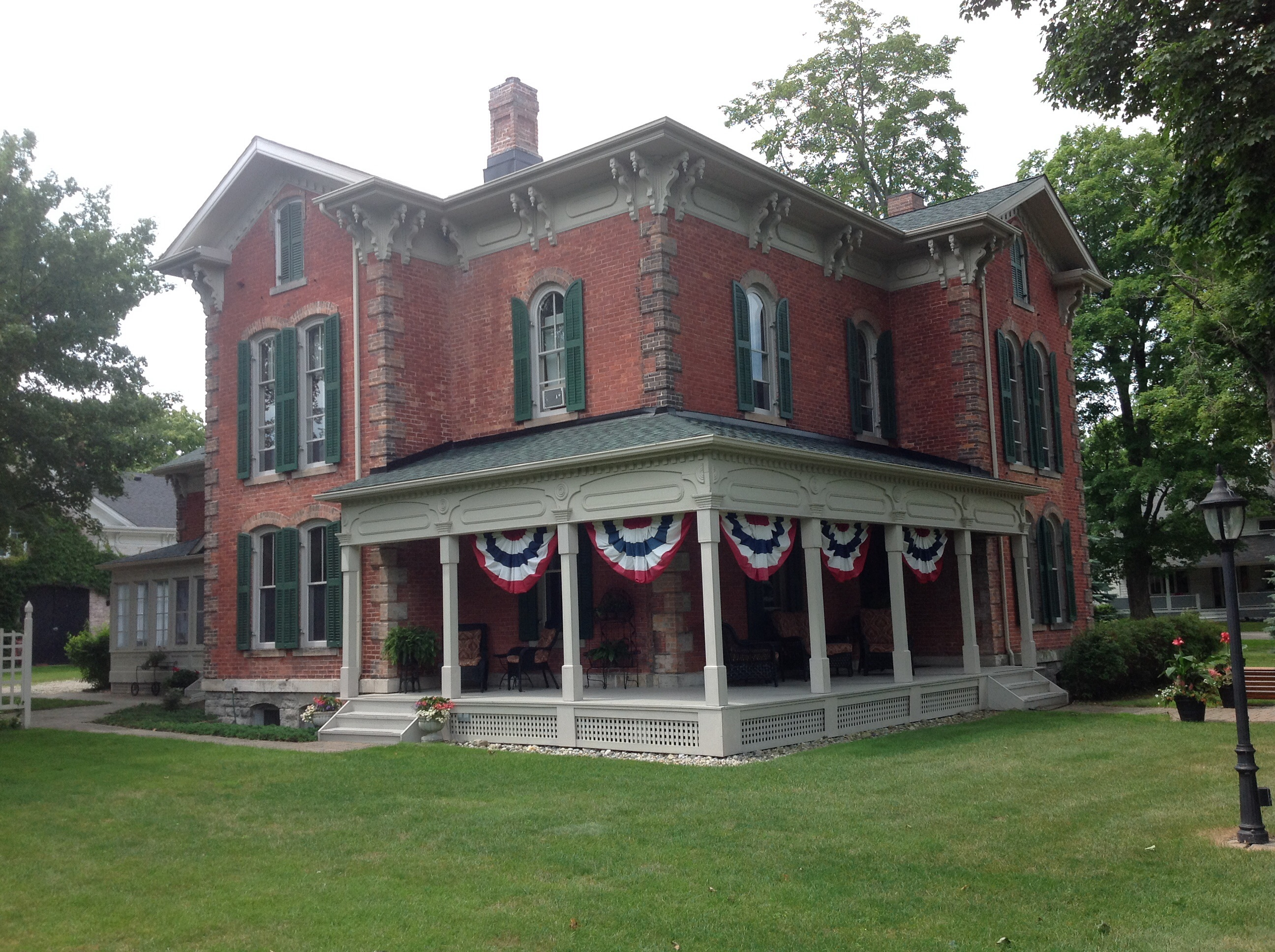

- Location within Michigan Location within the United States
- Interactive map
- Location: 7156 Huron Ave., Lexington, Michigan
- Coordinates: 43°16′3″N 82°32′9″W
- Area: 1 acre (0.40 ha)
- Built: 1874
- Architectural style: Italianate
- NRHP reference No.: 85000719
- Added to NRHP: April 11, 1985

The William Reuben Nims House is a private house located at 7156 Huron Avenue in Lexington, Michigan. It was listed on the National Register of Historic Places in 1985.

== History ==
William Reuben Nims was born in Richmond, Vermont, in 1829. He became a salesman for a local merchant, and in his travels met John L. Wood, who was becoming involved in both the mercantile business and lumber industry in Sanilac County. Wood invited Nims to join his firm, and in 1853 Nims moved to Lexington. By 1858, Nims's involvement in the business led Woods to make him a partner in the firm. In 1873, S. C. Tewksbury bought out Wood's interest, making Nims the senior partner.

Nims was also involved in family and community. He married his first wife, Susan B. Greene, in 1856, but she died six years later. During this time, Nims served as an alderman, a member of the Village Board of Trustees, and president of the village board. In 1864, he was elected to the Michigan Senate, serving two years. In 1872, Nims remarried, this time to Catherine Helena Schell of Lexington. The couple had three children.

In 1874, Nims built this elegant house. He continued to work until 1880, when he withdrew from his partnership with Tewksbury. spending much of his retirement raising horses. Nims continued to live in this house until his death in 1903. The house passed into multiple hands afterward. In 1942 it was purchased by Dr. Gwendal George Wilcox, who, like Nims, served as president of the village council.

== Description ==
The Nims House is a two-story brick Italianate structure. The front facade is three bays wide, with the rightmost bay projecting from the remainder. This bay contains paired rounded arch sash on the first and second floor levels, and another rounded arch window at the roofline with a gable above. The recessed bays contain a central front entrance and a floor-to-ceiling window on the first floor, and rounded arch, window on the second. The roofline is detailed with pairs of ornately curved brackets. The side facades contain the same rich Italianate detailing. A low two-story extension projects from the rear.

The interior of the house contains a wide central hall with parlors, study, and dining room to each side. A kitchen and pantry is at the rear. A tightly curved stairway leads to the upper level. The second floor contains four main bedrooms, with a maid's quarters in the rear.
