= Applegate, Michigan =

- Village
- Location of Applegate in Sanilac County, Michigan
- Coordinates: 43°21′19″N 82°38′13″W
- Country: United States
- State: Michigan
- County: Sanilac
- Township: Washington

Area
  - Total: 1.01 sq mi (2.62 km^{2})
  - Land: 1.00 sq mi (2.60 km^{2})
  - Water: 0.0077 sq mi (0.02 km^{2})
- Elevation: 748 ft (228 m)

Population (2020)
  - Total: 241
  - Density: 240.3/sq mi (92.79/km^{2})
- Time zone: UTC-5 (Eastern (EST))
  - Summer (DST): UTC-4 (EDT)
- ZIP code: 48401
- Area code: 810
- FIPS code: 26-03200
- GNIS feature ID: 2397974
- Website: https://www.villageofapplegate.com/

Applegate is a village in Sanilac County of the U.S. state of Michigan. The population was 241 at the 2020 census. Applegate is in the southeast corner of Washington Township on the boundary with Sanilac Township.

== History ==
Applegate originated in 1856 when George Pack (brother of John Pack) built a sawmill here.

== Geography ==
According to the United States Census Bureau, the village has a total area of 1.01 square miles (2.62 km^{2}), of which 1.00 square mile (2.59 km^{2}) is land and 0.01 square miles (0.03 km^{2}) is water.

== Demographics ==
Historical population
Census	Pop.	Note	%±
1910	155		—
1920	177		14.2%
1930	207		16.9%
1940	231		11.6%
1950	244		5.6%
1960	252		3.3%
1970	301		19.4%
1980	257		−14.6%
1990	297		15.6%
2000	287		−3.4%
2010	248		−13.6%
2020	241		−2.8%
U.S. Decennial Census

=== 2010 census ===
As of the census of 2010, there were 248 people, 95 households, and 65 families living in the village. The population density was 248.0 inhabitants per square mile (95.8/km^{2}). There were 111 housing units at an average density of 111.0 per square mile (42.9/km^{2}). The racial makeup of the village was 93.1% White, 3.2% African American, 2.4% Asian, and 1.2% from other races. Hispanic or Latino of any race were 3.2% of the population.

There were 95 households, of which 35.8% had children under the age of 18 living with them, 45.3% were married couples living together, 18.9% had a female householder with no husband present, 4.2% had a male householder with no wife present, and 31.6% were non-families. 29.5% of all households were made up of individuals, and 13.7% had someone living alone who was 65 years of age or older. The average household size was 2.61 and the average family size was 3.25.

The median age in the village was 34.6 years. 30.6% of residents were under the age of 18; 8.7% were between the ages of 18 and 24; 26.6% were from 25 to 44; 22.2% were from 45 to 64; and 12.1% were 65 years of age or older. The gender makeup of the village was 45.6% male and 54.4% female.

=== 2000 census ===
As of the census of 2000, there were 287 people, 102 households, and 79 families living in the village. The population density was 290.1 inhabitants per square mile (112.0/km^{2}). There were 106 housing units at an average density of 107.1 per square mile (41.4/km^{2}). The racial makeup of the village was 96.52% White, 2.09% from other races, and 1.39% from two or more races. Hispanic or Latino of any race were 6.97% of the population.

There were 102 households, out of which 43.1% had children under the age of 18 living with them, 55.9% were married couples living together, 13.7% had a female householder with no husband present, and 22.5% were non-families. 20.6% of all households were made up of individuals, and 11.8% had someone living alone who was 65 years of age or older. The average household size was 2.81 and the average family size was 3.22.

In the village, the population was spread out, with 32.8% under the age of 18, 7.0% from 18 to 24, 27.9% from 25 to 44, 19.5% from 45 to 64, and 12.9% who were 65 years of age or older. The median age was 31 years. For every 100 females, there were 90.1 males. For every 100 females age 18 and over, there were 85.6 males.

The median income for a household in the village was $32,188, and the median income for a family was $36,094. Males had a median income of $26,964 versus $20,000 for females. The per capita income for the village was $12,977. None of the families and 3.9% of the population were living below the poverty line, including no under eighteens and 10.8% of those over 64.
