= Sanilac Township, Michigan =

- Township
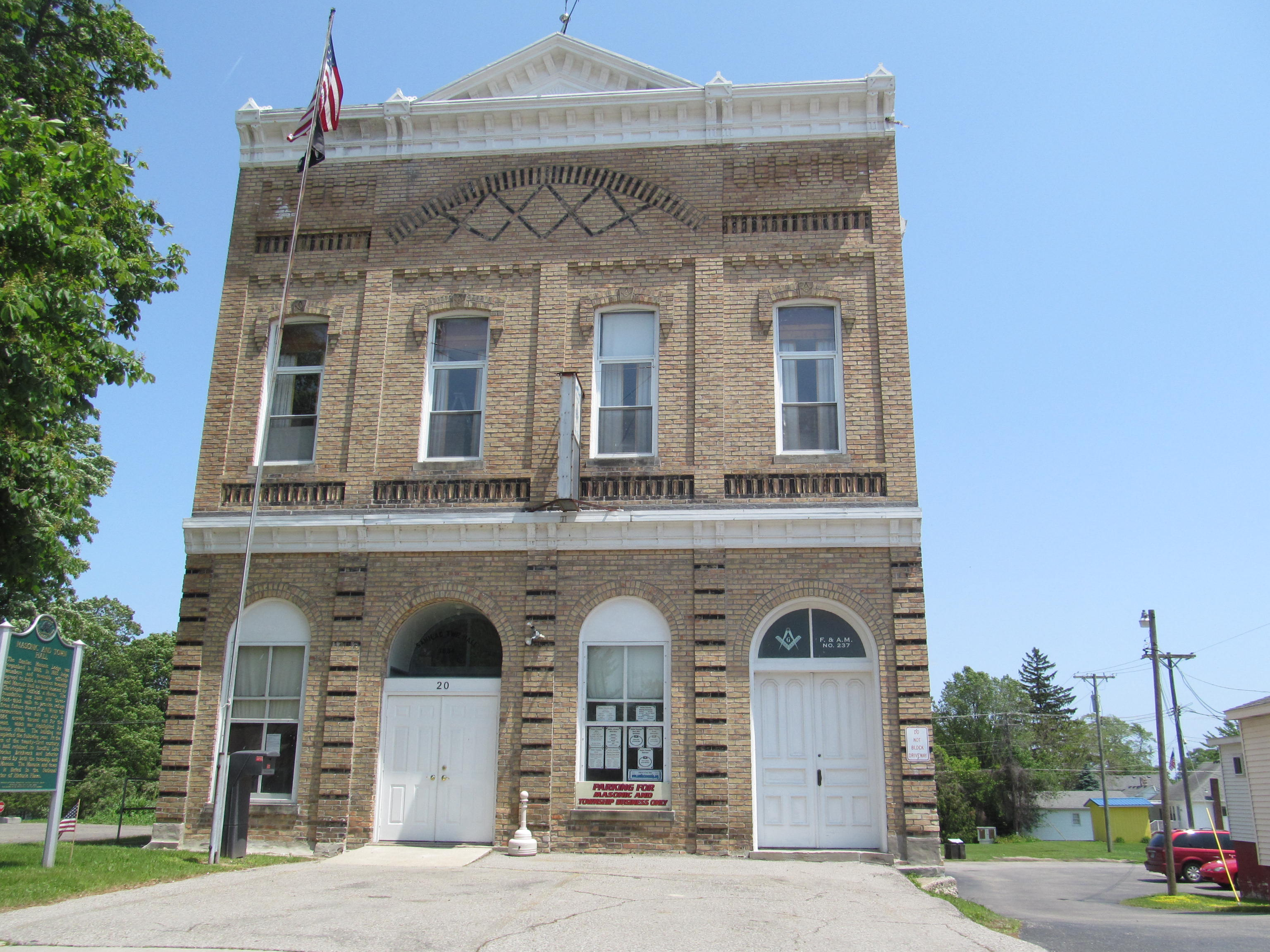
- Town hall

- Location within the state of Michigan Sanilac Township, Michigan (the United States)
- Coordinates: 43°24′31″N 82°33′34″W
- Country: United States
- State: Michigan
- County: Sanilac

Area
  - Total: 40.9 sq mi (106.0 km^{2})
  - Land: 40.9 sq mi (106.0 km^{2})
  - Water: 0 sq mi (0.0 km^{2})
- Elevation: 719 ft (219 m)

Population (2020)
  - Total: 2,301
  - Density: 56/sq mi (21.7/km^{2})
- Time zone: UTC-5 (Eastern (EST))
  - Summer (DST): UTC-4 (EDT)
- FIPS code: 26-71580
- GNIS feature ID: 1627043
- Website: https://sanilactownshipmi.gov/

Sanilac Township is a civil township of Sanilac County in the U.S. state of Michigan. The population was 2,301 at the 2020 census. The village of Port Sanilac is within the township.

== Geography ==
According to the United States Census Bureau, the township has a total area of 40.9 square miles (106 km^{2}), all land.

== Demographics ==
Historical population
Census	Pop.	Note	%±
2000	2,609		—
2010	2,431		−6.8%
2020	2,301		−5.3%

As of the census of 2000, there were 2,609 people, 1,144 households, and 751 families residing in the township. The population density was 63.7 inhabitants per square mile (24.6/km^{2}). There were 1,769 housing units at an average density of 43.2 per square mile (16.7/km^{2}). The racial makeup of the township was 97.36% White, 0.04% African American, 0.69% Native American, 0.34% Asian, 0.34% from other races, and 1.23% from two or more races. Hispanic or Latino of any race were 1.07% of the population.

There were 1,144 households, out of which 24.3% had children under the age of 18 living with them, 56.4% were married couples living together, 6.6% had a female householder with no husband present, and 34.3% were non-families. 31.1% of all households were made up of individuals, and 17.4% had someone living alone who was 65 years of age or older. The average household size was 2.27 and the average family size was 2.83.

In the township the population was spread out, with 22.2% under the age of 18, 6.4% from 18 to 24, 22.8% from 25 to 44, 26.7% from 45 to 64, and 21.9% who were 65 years of age or older. The median age was 44 years. For every 100 females, there were 92.5 males. For every 100 females age 18 and over, there were 88.0 males.

The median income for a household in the township was $37,180, and the median income for a family was $43,229. Males had a median income of $30,772 versus $20,573 for females. The per capita income for the township was $17,963. About 5.3% of families and 8.1% of the population were below the poverty line, including 14.1% of those under age 18 and 5.2% of those age 65 or over.
