= Croswell, Michigan =

- City
- Location of Croswell, Michigan
- Coordinates: 43°16′15″N 82°37′23″W
- Country: United States
- State: Michigan
- County: Sanilac

Area
  - Total: 2.42 sq mi (6.27 km^{2})
  - Land: 2.31 sq mi (5.97 km^{2})
  - Water: 0.12 sq mi (0.30 km^{2})
- Elevation: 732 ft (223 m)

Population (2020)
  - Total: 2,322
  - Density: 1,008/sq mi (389.1/km^{2})
- Time zone: UTC-5 (Eastern (EST))
  - Summer (DST): UTC-4 (EDT)
- ZIP code: 48422
- Area code: 810
- FIPS code: 26-18920
- GNIS feature ID: 0624126

Croswell is a city in Sanilac County in the U.S. state of Michigan. As of the 2020 census, Croswell had a population of 2,322.

== History ==
The settlement, originally known as Black River, was established in 1845. Later it was known as Davisville, after the town's first postmaster. In 1877 it was renamed Croswell, in honor of Governor Charles Croswell. The town separated politically from Lexington Township by incorporating as a city in 1881.

== Geography ==
According to the United States Census Bureau, the city has a total area of 2.41 square miles (6.24 km^{2}), of which 2.29 square miles (5.93 km^{2}) is land and 0.12 square miles (0.31 km^{2}) is water. It is considered to be part of the Thumb of Michigan, which in turn is a subregion of the Flint/Tri-Cities. Croswell can also be considered as in the Blue Water Area, a subregion of the Thumb.

== Demographics ==
Historical population
Census	Pop.	Note	%±
1880	447		—
1890	504		12.8%
1900	606		20.2%
1910	1,380		127.7%
1920	1,678		21.6%
1930	1,470		−12.4%
1940	1,381		−6.1%
1950	1,775		28.5%
1960	1,817		2.4%
1970	1,954		7.5%
1980	2,073		6.1%
1990	2,174		4.9%
2000	2,467		13.5%
2010	2,447		−0.8%
2020	2,322		−5.1%
U.S. Decennial Census

=== 2020 census ===
As of the 2020 census, Croswell had a population of 2,322. The median age was 40.1 years. 22.9% of residents were under the age of 18 and 18.6% of residents were 65 years of age or older. For every 100 females there were 93.8 males, and for every 100 females age 18 and over there were 86.8 males age 18 and over.

0.0% of residents lived in urban areas, while 100.0% lived in rural areas.

There were 979 households in Croswell, of which 30.1% had children under the age of 18 living in them. Of all households, 39.8% were married-couple households, 18.7% were households with a male householder and no spouse or partner present, and 32.9% were households with a female householder and no spouse or partner present. About 32.0% of all households were made up of individuals and 14.4% had someone living alone who was 65 years of age or older.

There were 1,058 housing units, of which 7.5% were vacant. The homeowner vacancy rate was 0.6% and the rental vacancy rate was 9.2%.

Racial composition as of the 2020 census
Race	Number	Percent
White	2,000	86.1%
Black or African American	10	0.4%
American Indian and Alaska Native	17	0.7%
Asian	2	0.1%
Native Hawaiian and Other Pacific Islander	0	0.0%
Some other race	95	4.1%
Two or more races	198	8.5%
Hispanic or Latino (of any race)	285	12.3%

=== 2010 census ===
As of the census of 2010, there were 2,447 people, 971 households, and 649 families living in the city. The population density was 1,068.6 inhabitants per square mile (412.6/km^{2}). There were 1,120 housing units at an average density of 489.1 units per square mile (188.8 units/km^{2}). The racial makeup of the city was 91.7% White, 0.5% African American, 0.7% Native American, 0.2% Asian, 5.1% from other races, and 1.8% from two or more races. Hispanic or Latino of any race were 12.8% of the population.

There were 971 households, of which 35.2% had children under the age of 18 living with them, 45.8% were married couples living together, 14.8% had a female householder with no husband present, 6.2% had a male householder with no wife present, and 33.2% were non-families. 27.9% of all households were made up of individuals, and 11.6% had someone living alone who was 65 years of age or older. The average household size was 2.51 and the average family size was 3.00.

The median age in the city was 38.8 years. 26.8% of residents were under the age of 18; 7.5% were between the ages of 18 and 24; 24.5% were from 25 to 44; 26.9% were from 45 to 64; and 14.2% were 65 years of age or older. The gender makeup of the city was 47.8% male and 52.2% female.

=== 2000 census ===
As of the census of 2000, there were 2,467 people, 914 households, and 633 families living in the city. The population density was 1,080.1 inhabitants per square mile (417.0/km^{2}). There were 973 housing units at an average density of 426.0 units per square mile (164.5 units/km^{2}). The racial makeup of the city was 90.80% White, 0.16% African American, 0.45% Native American, 6.61% from other races, and 1.99% from two or more races. Hispanic or Latino of any race were 12.61% of the population.

There were 914 households, out of which 38.3% had children under the age of 18 living with them, 49.0% were married couples living together, 16.1% had a female householder with no husband present, and 30.7% were non-families. 27.7% of all households were made up of individuals, and 13.3% had someone living alone who was 65 years of age or older. The average household size was 2.68 and the average family size was 3.24.

In the city, the population was spread out, with 30.5% under the age of 18, 9.5% from 18 to 24, 28.6% from 25 to 44, 19.4% from 45 to 64, and 12.0% who were 65 years of age or older. The median age was 33 years. For every 100 females, there were 91.8 males. For every 100 females age 18 and over, there were 83.3 males.

The median income for a household in the city was $30,379, and the median income for a family was $37,593. Males had a median income of $30,375 versus $20,231 for females. The per capita income for the city was $12,686. About 10.4% of families and 12.6% of the population were below the poverty line, including 11.3% of those under age 18 and 12.2% of those age 65 or over.

== Industry ==
The surrounding areas are mostly engaged in farming. Crops include corn, wheat, oats, soy beans, sugar beets, peas, and alfalfa (hay).

== Landmarks ==
The most notable landmark in Croswell is the "Be Good to Your Mother-In-Law" footbridge, which runs across the Black River. The cable and wood plank suspension bridge is known locally as the "Swinging Bridge" and is the setting of the annual Swinging Bridge Festival.

Croswell is also home to one of two fixed 4-way traffic signals still operating in the state of Michigan, located at the intersection of Howard Street and Sanborn Avenue.

== Events ==
One of the oldest fairs in Michigan, the Croswell Agricultural Society Fair (est. 1884), is held each summer at the Croswell Fairgrounds located at Harrington and Croswell Roads.

== Transportation ==
Arnold Field is a public-use airport located two nautical miles (2.3 mi; 3.7 km) northeast of Croswell's central business district.
