= Lexington, Michigan =

- Village
- Looking west up Huron Street, Lexington, Michigan

- Location of Lexington, Michigan
- Coordinates: 43°16′7″N 82°32′1″W
- Country: United States
- State: Michigan
- County: Sanilac

Area
  - Total: 1.39 sq mi (3.61 km^{2})
  - Land: 1.38 sq mi (3.58 km^{2})
  - Water: 0.012 sq mi (0.03 km^{2})
- Elevation: 617 ft (188 m)

Population (2020)
  - Total: 943
  - Density: 682.3/sq mi (263.43/km^{2})
- Time zone: UTC-5 (Eastern (EST))
  - Summer (DST): UTC-4 (EDT)
- ZIP code: 48450
- Area code: 810
- FIPS code: 26-47280
- GNIS feature ID: 0630359
- Website: Village website

Lexington is a village in Sanilac County in the U.S. state of Michigan. As of the 2020 census, Lexington had a population of 943. The village is located within Lexington Township.

== Geography ==
- According to the United States Census Bureau, the village has a total area of 1.41 square miles (3.65 km^{2}), of which 1.40 square miles (3.63 km^{2}) is land and 0.01 square miles (0.03 km^{2}) is water.

== Demographics ==
Historical population
| Census | Pop. | Note | %± |
|---|---|---|---|
| 1880 | 953 | | — |
| 1890 | 712 | | −25.3% |
| 1900 | 619 | | −13.1% |
| 1910 | 519 | | −16.2% |
| 1920 | 378 | | −27.2% |
| 1930 | 380 | | 0.5% |
| 1940 | 326 | | −14.2% |
| 1950 | 594 | | 82.2% |
| 1960 | 722 | | 21.5% |
| 1970 | 834 | | 15.5% |
| 1980 | 765 | | −8.3% |
| 1990 | 779 | | 1.8% |
| 2000 | 1,104 | | 41.7% |
| 2010 | 1,178 | | 6.7% |
| 2020 | 943 | | −19.9% |
U.S. Decennial Census

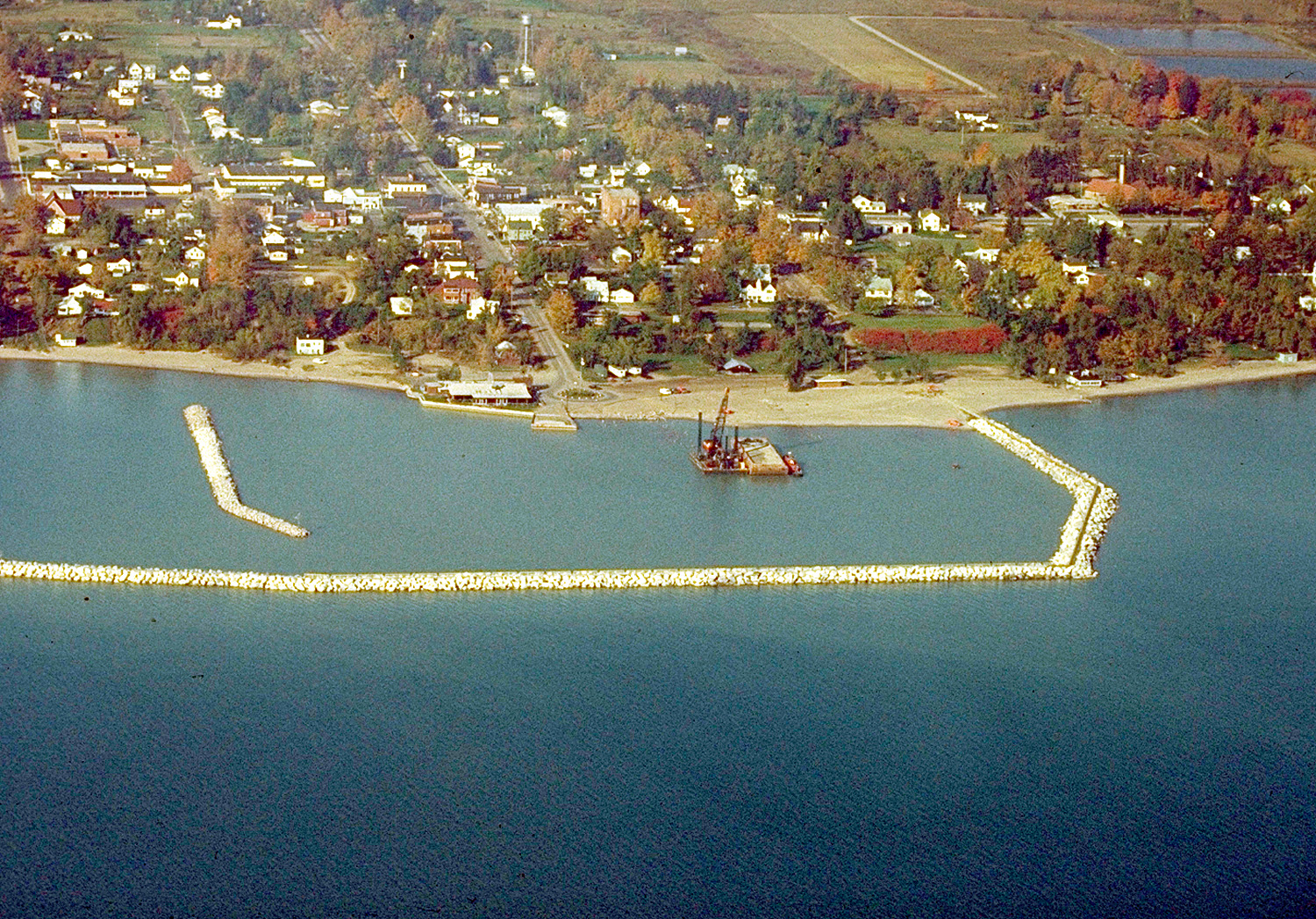
Aerial view of Lexington, Michigan on Lake Huron

=== 2010 census ===
As of the 2010 census, there were 1,178 people, 599 households, and 331 families living in the village. The population density was 841.4 inhabitants per square mile (324.9/km^{2}). There were 1,114 housing units at an average density of 795.7 per square mile (307.2/km^{2}). The racial makeup of the village was 97.3% White, 0.3% African American, 0.2% Native American, 0.3% Asian, 0.7% from other races, and 1.3% from two or more races. Hispanic or Latino of any race were 1.5% of the population.

There were 599 households, of which 17.5% had children under the age of 18 living with them, 42.2% were married couples living together, 10.2% had a female householder with no husband present, 2.8% had a male householder with no wife present, and 44.7% were non-families. 40.6% of all households were made up of individuals, and 21.4% had someone living alone who was 65 years of age or older. The average household size was 1.95, and the average family size was 2.57.

The median age in the village was 55.2 years. 15.2% of residents were under the age of 18; 6.2% were between the ages of 18 and 24; 14.8% were from 25 to 44; 30.8% were from 45 to 64; and 33% were 65 years of age or older. The gender makeup of the village was 46.3% male and 53.7% female.

=== 2000 census ===
As of the census of 2000, there were 1,104 people, 550 households, and 305 families living in the village. The population density was 1,188.3 inhabitants per square mile (458.8/km^{2}). There were 1,060 housing units at an average density of 1,140.9 per square mile (440.5/km^{2}). The racial makeup of the village was 98.82% White, 0.19% Native American, 0.36% Asian, 0.18% from other races, and 0.45% from two or more races. Hispanics or Latinos of any race were 1.54% of the population.

There were 550 households, out of which 21.8% had children under the age of 18 living with them, 43.8% were married couples living together, 7.8% had a female householder with no husband present, and 44.5% were non-families. 40.6% of all households were made up of individuals, and 20.2% had someone living alone who was 65 years of age or older. The average household size was 1.98, and the average family size was 2.65.

In the village, the population was spread out, with 20.0% under the age of 18, 6.7% from 18 to 24, 20.2% from 25 to 44, 26.1% from 45 to 64, and 27.0% who were 65 years of age or older. The median age was 47 years. For every 100 females, there were 81.9 males. For every 100 females age 18 and over, there were 74.9 males.

The median household income in the village was $30,792, and the median family income was $41,364. Males had a median income of $36,346 versus $25,809 for females. The per capita income for the village was $22,218. About 7.3% of families and 9.4% of the population were below the poverty line, including 12.0% of those under age 18 and 5.4% of those age 65 or over.

== Harbor ==
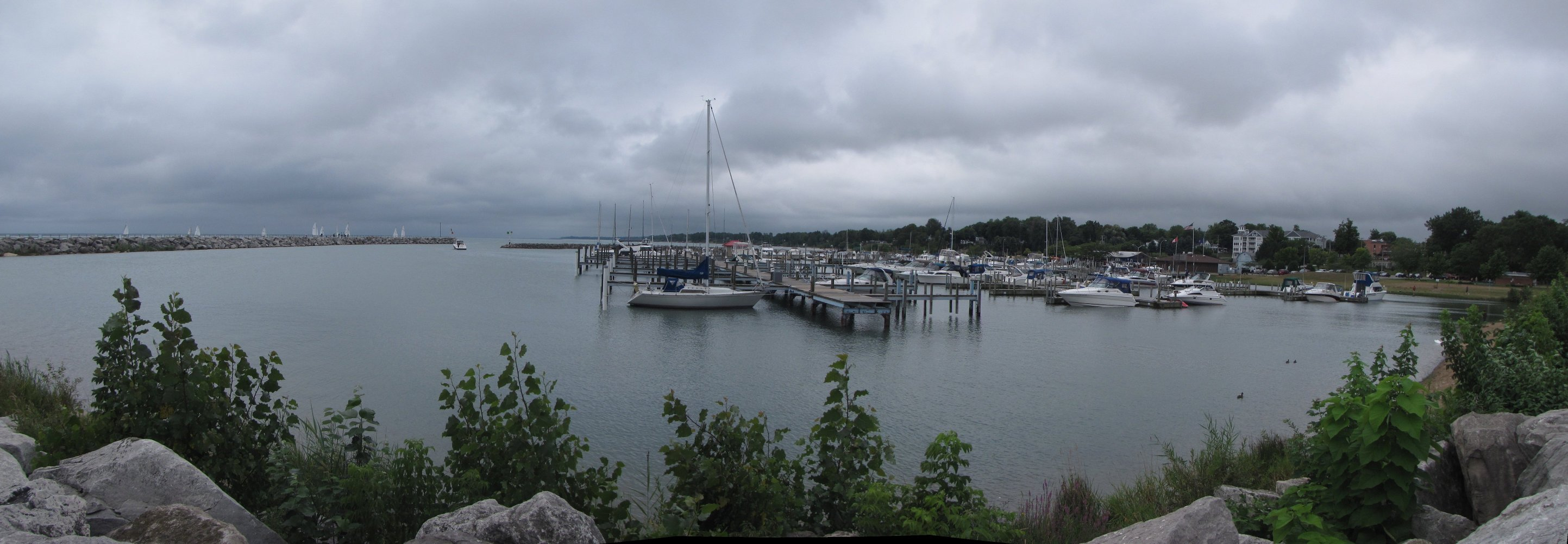
Lexington State Harbor

Lexington Harbor was constructed and maintained by the U.S. Army Corps of Engineers, as authorized by the River and Harbor Act of 1965. The harbor serves mainly recreational boating activities and contains launch/retrieval ramps, fueling facilities, and 190 berthing slips, which both public and private agencies operate.

Due to sediment infiltration through and along the peripheral breakwalls, the harbor requires regular dredging to maintain navigable channels. Dredging occurs approximately every 3 to 5 years, with the excavated sediment deposited on the beaches surrounding the breakwalls.

== Notable people ==
- Harriet Gertrude Eddy, librarian and educator, born in Lexington, California Library Hall of Fame
- Louis H. Fead, Chief Justice of the Michigan Supreme Court, was born in Lexington
- Walter Lorenzo Marr, automotive pioneer, was born in Lexington
- Charles Lathrop Pack, lumberman, was born in Lexington
- Albert Sleeper, former Governor of Michigan, lived and died in Lexington
