= List of marine protected areas of the Great Lakes =

The following is a list of protected areas and preserves within the Great Lakes area.

- Alger Underwater Preserve
- Apostle Islands National Lakeshore
- Calumet Shoreline
- De Tour Passage Underwater Preserve
- Glenwood Shoreline
- Grand Traverse Bay Bottomland Preserve
- Fathom Five National Marine Park
- Indiana Dunes National Park
- Keweenau Underwater Preserve
- Lake Superior National Marine Conservation Area
- Manitou Passage Underwater Preserve
- Marquette Underwater Preserve
- Pictured Rocks National Lakeshore
- Sanilac Shores Underwater Preserve
- Sleeping Bear Dunes National Lakeshore
- Southwest Michigan Underwater Preserve
- Straits of Mackinac Shipwreck Preserve
- Thumb Area Bottomland Preserve
- Thunder Bay National Marine Sanctuary and Underwater Preserve
- Whitefish Point Underwater Preserve
