= Michigan Underwater Preserves =

Protected areas of the Great Lakes on Michigan's coast

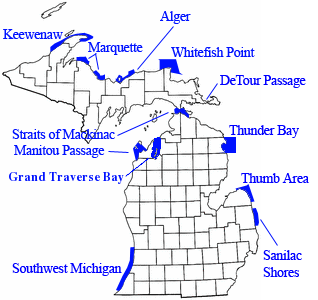
Michigan Underwater Preserves

Michigan Underwater Preserves or Michigan Bottomland Preserves are protected areas of the Great Lakes on Michigan's coast. The thirteen designated areas, comprising a surface area of over 7,000 square miles (18,000 km^{2}), are considered to be "Underwater museums" and serve to protect concentrations of shipwrecks, unique geologic features and other submerged sites through awareness and public interest. The program is currently receiving no funding from the state and does not offer any extra legal protection for the sites in the preserves. However, it is a felony to remove or disturb underwater artifacts in the Great Lakes. Persons apprehended and convicted of removing or willfully damaging underwater artifacts risk confiscation of their equipment (boats, cars, dive gear, etc.), stiff fines and up to two years imprisonment. The Michigan Underwater Preserve Council advocates on behalf of all of Michigan's Underwater Preserves.

Below is a list of the 13 underwater preserves in the State of Michigan:

- Alger Underwater Preserve
- De Tour Passage Underwater Preserve
- Grand Traverse Bay Bottomland Preserve
- Keweenaw Underwater Preserve
- Manitou Passage Underwater Preserve
- Marquette Underwater Preserve
- Sanilac Shores Underwater Preserve
- Southwest Michigan Underwater Preserve
- Straits of Mackinac Shipwreck Preserve
- Thumb Area Bottomland Preserve
- Thunder Bay National Marine Sanctuary and Underwater Preserve
- West Michigan Underwater Preserve
- Whitefish Point Underwater Preserve
