= Beulah Brinton =

American social worker

Beulah Tobey Brinton
- Born: 1835; Jay, New York, US
- Died: March 18, 1928; Bay View, Wisconsin
- Resting place: Forest Home Cemetery
- Occupation(s): Social worker, community organizer, teacher, author and midwife
- Known for: Founding United States' First Practical Social Center
- Spouse: Warren Brinton (m. 1854; died 1895)
- Children: Emily Brinton Jupp (1861-1941); Warren Dillon Brinton, Jr. (1868-1948); Daisy Brinton Worcester (1876-1902)
- Relatives: Eber Brock Ward, cousin Oscar Thomas Brinton, brother-in-law & namesake of Brinton, Michigan
- Website: https://bayviewhistoricalsociety.org/bay-view/#beulah-brinton

Beulah Brinton (1836–1928) was an American social worker who opened her Milwaukee, Wisconsin home to the families of Bay View’s immigrant rolling mill workers in the 1870s. Her teaching of reading, music, English, cooking, and sewing to the iron men’s children and wives and occasional service as midwife predated the celebrated work of settlement houses in London and New York. Recalled as “perhaps the outstanding woman of Bay View’s history” and the “real literary leader of the early community,” Brinton pursued community-building efforts that transcended ordinary neighborliness, prompted by an expansive religious faith and sense of duty to “her fellow men.”

== Early life and marriage ==
She was born in New York in 1836 as Bulah Tobey, at a time when spelling was more fluid than it would become. In 1854 Beulah married Connecticut native Warren Brinton, a millwright whose work took the couple from New England to Missouri’s iron district and steel mills on the Great Lakes. The couple’s five children were born in Vermont, Missouri, and Michigan.

Before coming to Milwaukee, the Brintons lived in Wyandotte, Michigan, site of the Eureka Iron & Steel Works, established in 1853 by Beulah’s cousin Eber Brock Ward. A former Great Lakes ship captain, Ward had incorporated the Milwaukee Iron Company in 1867. Warren served the Milwaukee works for two decades as weighmaster, timekeeper, and paymaster.

== Milwaukee community outreach ==
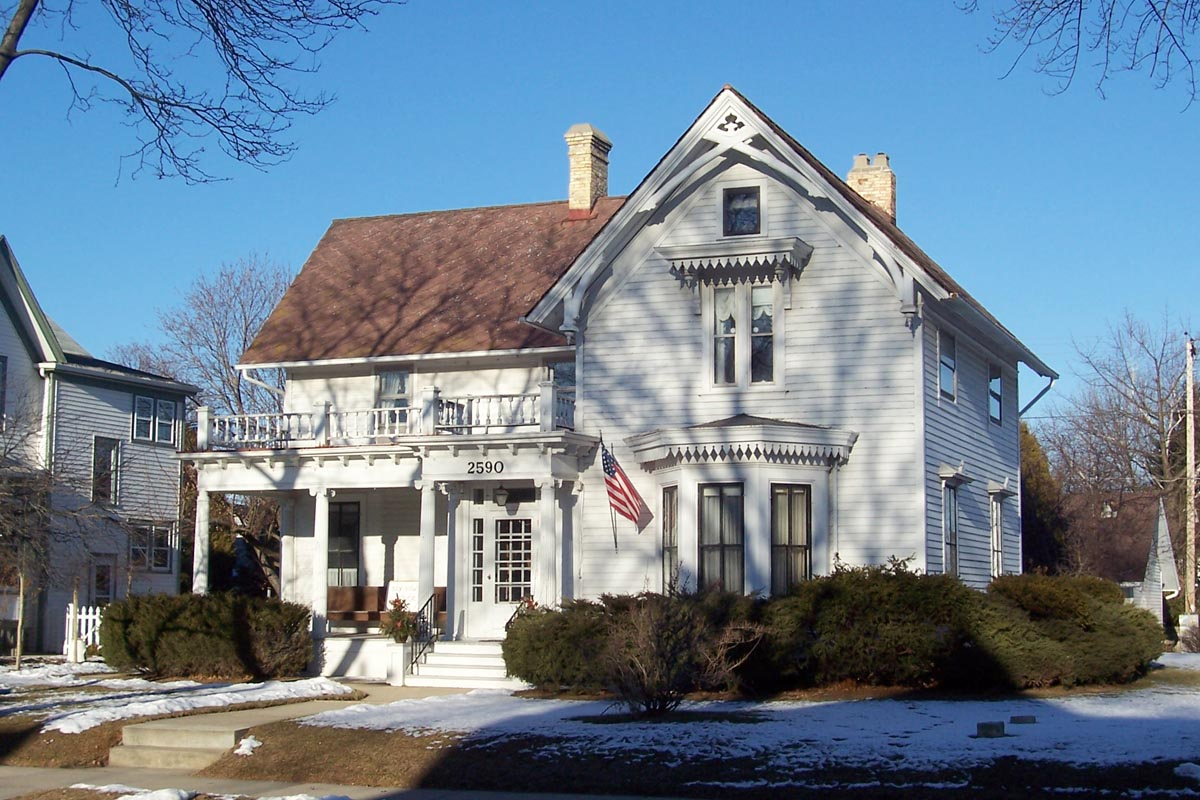

In Milwaukee, Brinton organized neighbors’ relief efforts after the Great Chicago Fire of October 1871 and sought in 1886 to reconcile all parties in the wake of May’s National Guard shootings of a group agitating for the 8-hour workday.

A lending library that Brinton started outgrew her parlor, moved to a room at the rolling mill, then a neighborhood school, and became the nucleus of Milwaukee’s first branch library. She helped organize the Bay View Literary Society, which frequently met in Puddlers Hall, a union hall on Saint Clair Street. The family’s time in Missouri was recalled in 'Man is Love', Beulah’s somber Civil War novel, published by Lippincott in 1874. She later published a book of mystical poems, 'Behold the Woman', while editing a village newspaper, The Bay View Herald.

She popularized tennis in the 1880s, having a court laid out on her house’s side lot. A basket of rackets on the back porch was available for whoever wished to play. Beulah once led local children to claim an empty lot for a neighborhood park. That plot is now part of South Shore Park, through which South Shore Drive – originally called Beulah Avenue – winds. Beulah also preached at her Methodist church and served on its mission board and was an officer of a local Republican women’s committee.

After her husband’s death in 1895, Brinton retired to Chicago, living with her son Warren Junior, an International Harvester executive whose manufacturing career had begun in the Bay View mill. Brinton returned to her old home in 1926 to live with the family of her granddaughter Mabel Pickard and Ray Estes and died there in 1928. The Brinton house now serves as headquarters of the Bay View Historical Society.

== Legacy ==
When a neighborhood community center opened in 1924 in a former firehouse on Saint Clair Street, it was considered a direct continuation of her home service and named for her. Brinton came from Chicago to speak at its dedication; a proclamation for the event and a portrait of Brinton grace the lobby of a newer Beulah Brinton Center on Bay Street. Beulah Brinton Park in Milwaukee County is also named after Brinton.
