= Bay View Garden And Yard Society =

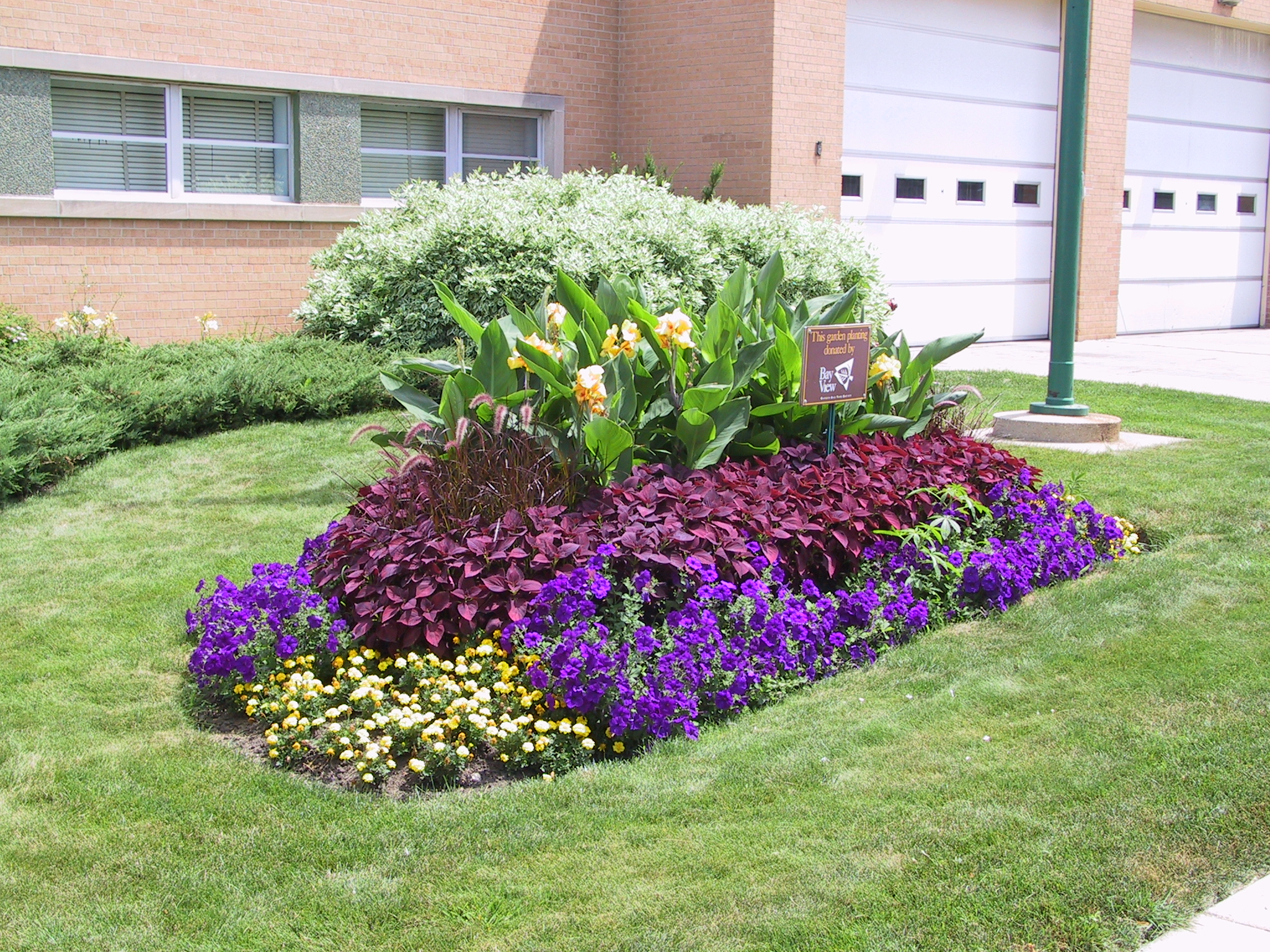
Gardens planted by the Bay View Garden and Yard Society at the Bay View Firehouse

The Bay View Garden And Yard Society is a nonprofit 501(c)(7) organization based in the Bay View neighborhood of Milwaukee, Wisconsin, United States.

Sometimes referred to by the acronym BVGAYS, the membership of the Society consists of persons living predominantly in Bay View, who volunteer their time and talents by maintaining public gardens in Bay View. Inherent to the group's philosophy is the principle that by maintaining one's own property, others are inspired to follow by example.

== Objectives ==
According to the organization's by-laws, the purpose of the Bay View Garden And Yard Society is:

- To have fun while promoting the Bay View community through the beautification of our gardens and yards.
- To share gardening information, exchange plants, and share information that is of particular interest to those living in Bay View.
- To encourage others in Bay View to maintain their gardens, yards, and homes.
- To volunteer our time and talent in maintaining public gardens in Bay View.

Some of the Society's member events and functions include annual plant exchanges, round robins at member's homes, monthly group dining out, and tours of local greenhouses and botanical gardens. In addition to the development of public gardens throughout Bay View, the group enjoys a high visibility in the community by presenting gardening demonstrations at the South Shore Farmers' Market, hosting gardening seminars, contributing to temporary art installations, and participating in local events such as the Bay View Neighborhood Association's Winter Blast and Chill-on-the-Hill.

Beyond the initial social aspects of the Society, the group became more involved in a variety of community projects: participating in neighborhood cleanups, assisting local schools with rain garden development, and the installation of several landscaping projects to add to the aesthetics of the neighborhood.

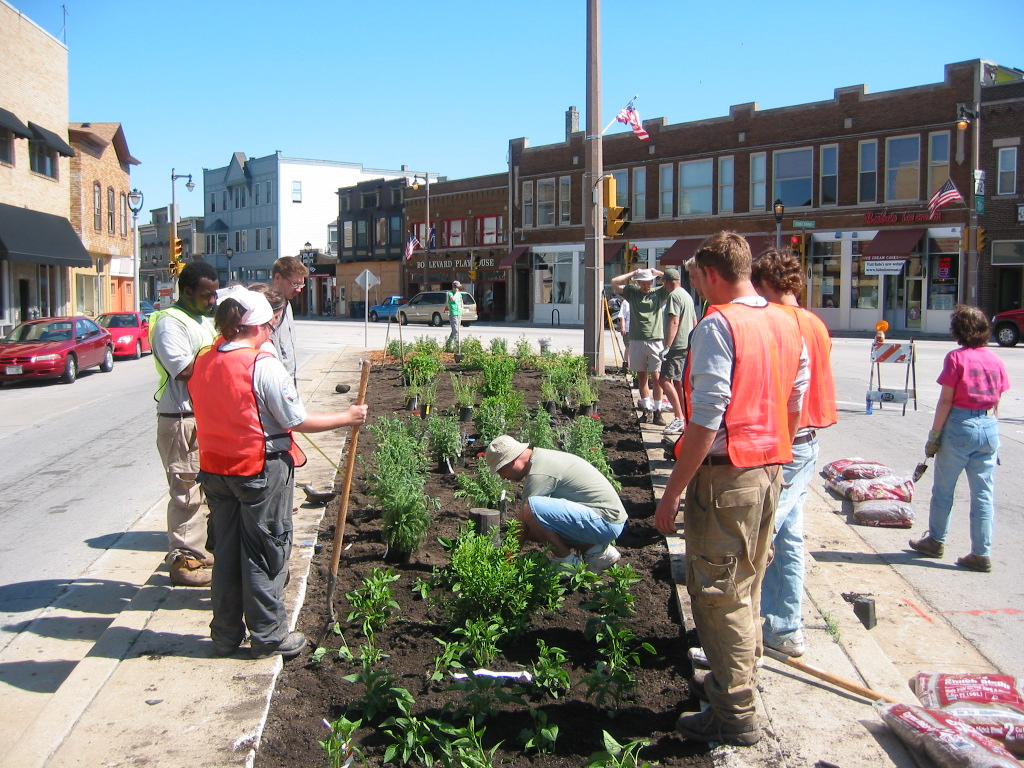
The group planting at the KK Triangle Garden

One of the group's original projects was the Bay View Firehouse garden at Milwaukee Fire Department Engine 11, located at 2526 S. Kinnickinnic Avenue. In 2002, the group planted and maintained gardens at the Beulah Brinton Community Center, and installed a Liberty Garden at the WWII Memorial on Kinnickinnic & Russell Avenues. In 2004, the group added new park benches and assumed the maintenance of the flower planters at the Pryor Avenue Iron Well. In 2008, the group teamed up with the Bay View Neighborhood Association and the City of Milwaukee to tear out a concrete island and develop a garden in the median at the intersection of Kinnickinnic, Howell & Lincoln Avenues.

The group continues to maintain and develop most of these sites and has received recognition not only for their efforts in the Bay View community, but also for their contributions to the gay community in Milwaukee.

== Community gardening ==
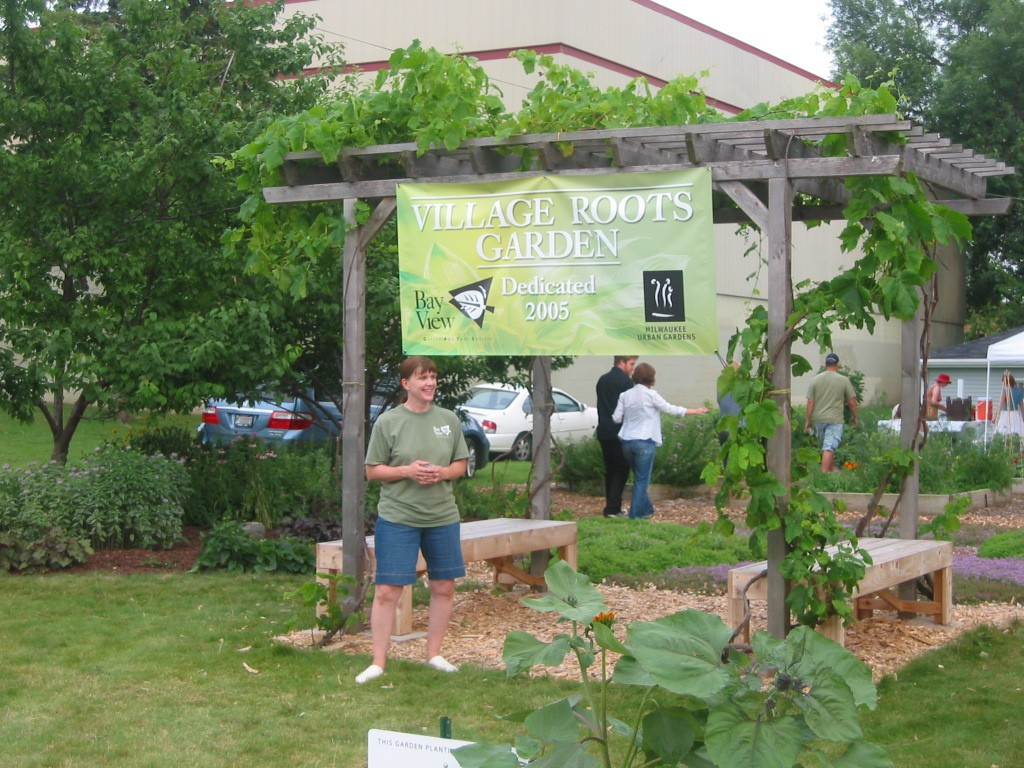
Entrance to the Village Roots Garden during the Celebrate Roots event

Since 2001, the main centerpiece and major focus of the Society's efforts has been the Village Roots Garden located at 1115 E. Otjen Street. On February 20, 2002, the South Community Organization donated the vacant lot to Milwaukee Urban Gardens (MUG), a nonprofit land trust. The lot became MUG's first owned property, and the Bay View Garden And Yard Society soon began developing the empty lot into Bay View's first community garden. The Society members provided the labor, maintenance, and most of the plants for the site, and the gardens there remain the primary focus of the group.

The core of the site consists of eight 8-foot square raised community garden beds that are rented annually for a nominal fee, and four triangular raised trial-garden beds maintained by the group. Outlining the lot are large beds planted with fruit trees and shrubs to provide shelter and food for birds, and perennial flowerbeds to attract bees and butterflies. To add a decorative element to the garden, there is a large crushed-stone compass feature inter-planted with thyme, and a grapevine covered cedar pergola with benches. There are also plantings of asparagus, strawberries, raspberries, spring flowering bulbs, and woodland plants. All pathways between the beds are mulched for weed control, and the lawn areas are planted with no-mow grass for ease of maintenance. Renters of the community garden plots have ready access to all of the tools in the garden shed, and there is also a water source nearby.

A formal dedication ceremony attended by local dignitaries was held at the garden site on June 26, 2005 to commemorate the completion of the Village Roots Garden and to celebrate the 10th anniversary of the Bay View Garden And Yard Society. In an effort to promote community participation and environmental awareness, the Society continues to sponsor occasional meetings, celebrations, and garden tours at the site. The community garden is also one of the stops on the annual MUG Fall Community Garden Tour.

== Membership, funding, and the Bay View Plant Sale ==
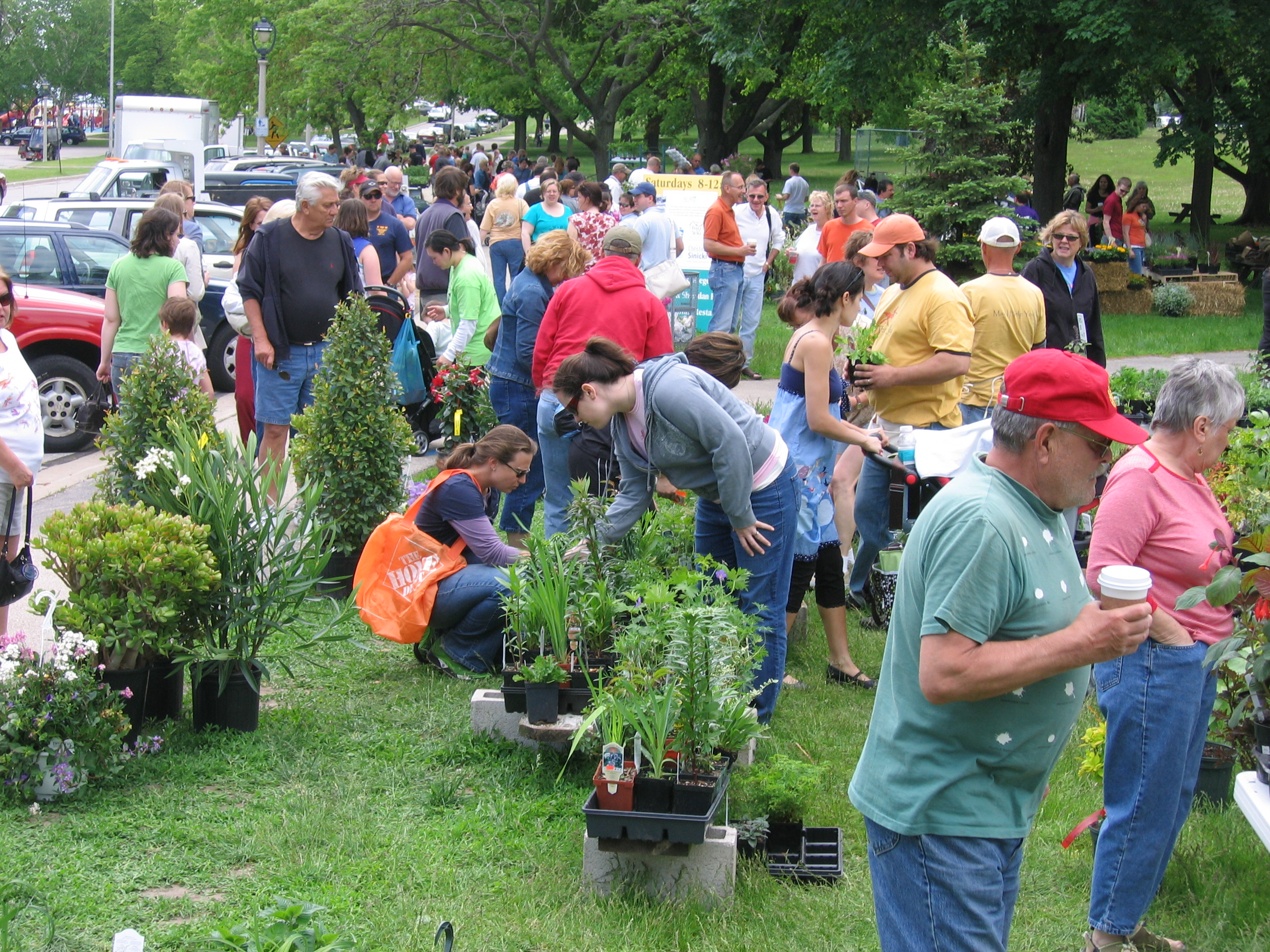
Customers shopping during the annual Bay View Plant Sale

Membership dues are collected from members annually and are used to fund the group's many public service projects and the operating costs of the Society. Group meetings are held the 4th Wednesday of each month from January through October at the historic Beulah Brinton House, and an annual appreciation dinner is held in November.

Beginning in 2005, the group began hosting the annual Bay View Plant Sale to raise the funds necessary for its many gardening and outreach endeavors. In collaboration with the South Shore Farmers' Market and the Milwaukee County Park System, this annual event is held the first Saturday after Memorial Day, rain or shine, at South Shore Park in Bay View. Local businesses help to sponsor the event, and a number of local, commercial plant vendors are invited to attend. Shoppers are able to make their selections from hundreds of annual and perennial plants, and coffee and bakery are also available for sale.
