= Skillogalee =

Skillogalee may refer to:

- Skillogalee Creek, a tributary of the Wakefield River that arises in the Skilly Hills, South Australia
- Skillogalee Winery, in the Clare Valley region of South Australia

== See also ==
- Skillagallee, an island in Lake Michigan also known as Ile Aux Galets
