= SS Cayuga =

American freighter, in service 1889–1895

Coordinates: 45°43′14.34″N 85°11′24.06″W

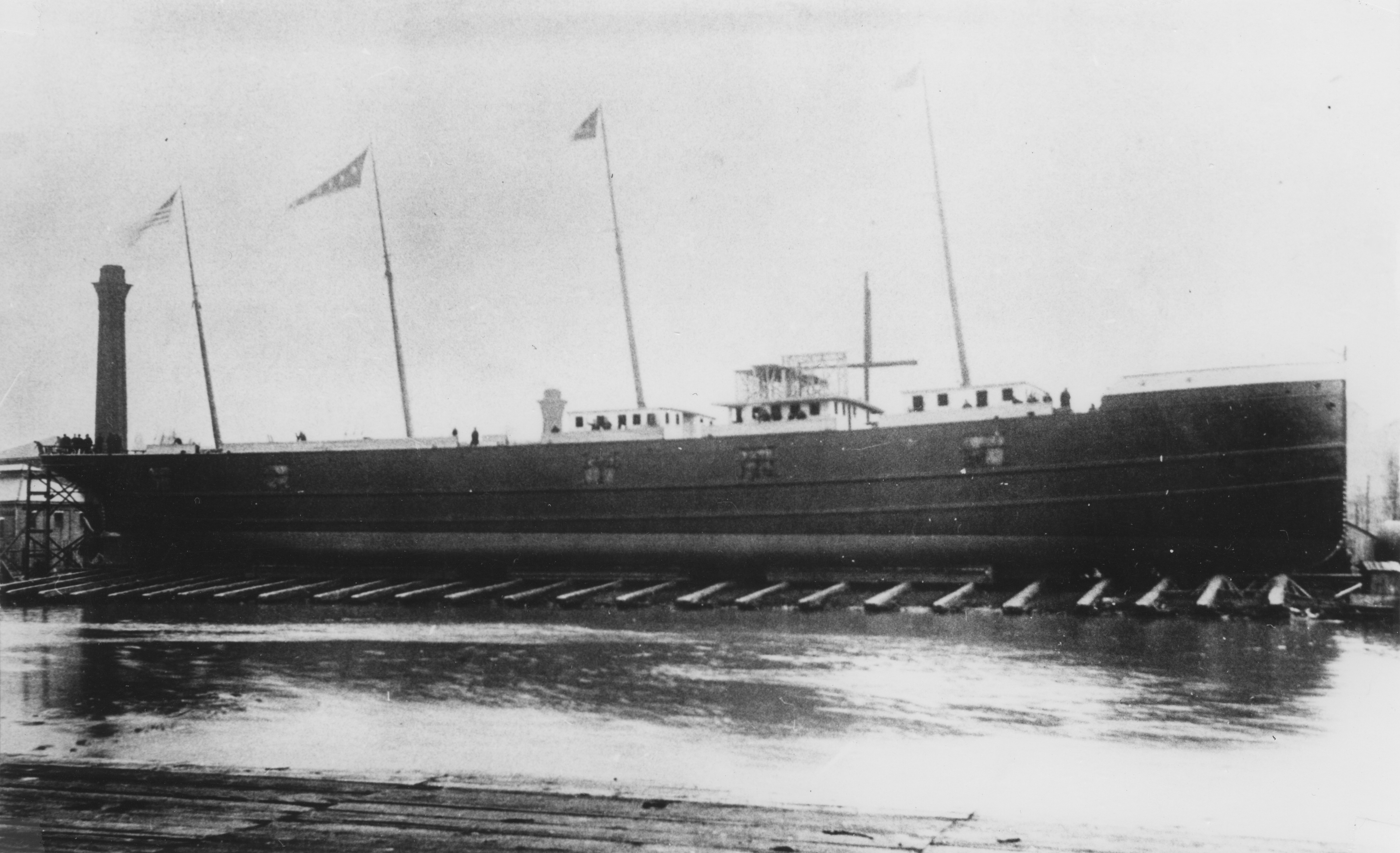
- Cayuga on the ways, prior to her launching

History

United States
- Name: Cayuga
- Namesake: Cayuga Creek
- Operator: Lehigh Valley Transit Company, Buffalo, New York; Managed by John Gordon, later W.P. Henry
- Port of registry: Buffalo, New York, United States
- Builder: Globe Iron Works Company, Cleveland, Ohio
- Yard number: 24
- Launched: April 2, 1889
- In service: 1889
- Out of service: May 10, 1895
- Identification: US official number 126556
- Fate: Sank in a collision on Lake Michigan

General characteristics
- Class & type: Package freighter
- Tonnage: 2,669 GRT; 1,939 NRT
- Length: 308.8 ft (94.1 m) LOA; 290 ft (88 m) LBP
- Beam: 40.66 ft (12.39 m)
- Draft: 16.5 ft (5.0 m)
- Depth: 23.5 ft (7.2 m)
- Installed power: Engine: 1 × 1,500 hp (1,100 kW) 85 rpm triple expansion steam engine; Boilers: 3 × 160 psi (1,100 kPa) Scotch marine boilers
- Propulsion: 1 × 4–bladed fixed pitch propeller
- Speed: c. 14 mph (12 kn)
- Capacity: c. 3,000 long tons (3,000 t)
- Crew: 30

SS Cayuga was a steel-hulled American package freighter in service in the late 19th century. She was built in 1889 in Cleveland, Ohio, by the Globe Iron Works Company Cayuga entered service the same year, carrying package freight between Buffalo and Chicago, Illinois, also making stops in Milwaukee, Wisconsin, and Gladstone, Michigan. Prior to her sinking, Cayuga was involved in two accidents. In the first in 1890, when she went aground in a gale just outside of Buffalo harbour; six tugboats pulled her free that same day. The second accident occurred in 1891, when Cayuga was involved in a collision with the package freighter Delaware near Cheboygan, Michigan.

On the morning of May 10, 1895, Cayuga while bound for Buffalo with a cargo of oats, flour and general merchandise. A thick fog hung over Lake Michigan. As Cayuga neared Ile Aux Galets, her crew spotted the lights of the downbound wooden freighter Joseph L. Hurd. At 4:00 or 4:30 a.m., Joseph L. Hurd struck Cayuga on her starboard side, tearing a hole in her hull; Joseph L. Hurd lost her bow, but was kept afloat by her cargo, while Cayuga sank 25 minutes later. The passing freighter Manola rescued the crews of the two vessels. The steward/cook of Joseph L. Hurd was the only casualty.

The wreck of Cayuga was located later in 1895. Due to her value, multiple attempts to raise her were made between 1896 and 1900 by Captain James Reid of Bay City, Michigan. His efforts were plagued by problems such as decompression sickness, the loss of several steel pontoons, a derrick barge and the alleged death of a hard-hat diver. Cayuga's wreck was re-discovered in the spring of 1969 by John Steele and Gene Turner.

== History ==
=== Background ===
In 1843, the gunship USS Michigan, built in Erie, Pennsylvania, became the first iron-hulled vessel constructed on the Great Lakes. In the mid-1840s, Canadian companies began importing iron vessels prefabricated by shipyards in the United Kingdom. However, it would not be until 1862 that the first iron-hulled merchant ship, Merchant, was fabricated in Buffalo, New York. Despite the success of Merchant, wooden vessels remained preferable to iron ones until the 1880s, due to their affordability and the region's abundance of timber. In the early 1880s, shipyards around the Great Lakes began to construct iron ships on a relatively large scale; in 1882, Onoko, an iron freighter, temporarily became the largest ship on the lakes. In 1884, the first steel freighters were built on the Great Lakes, and by the 1890s, the majority of ships constructed on the lakes were steel.

=== Design and construction ===
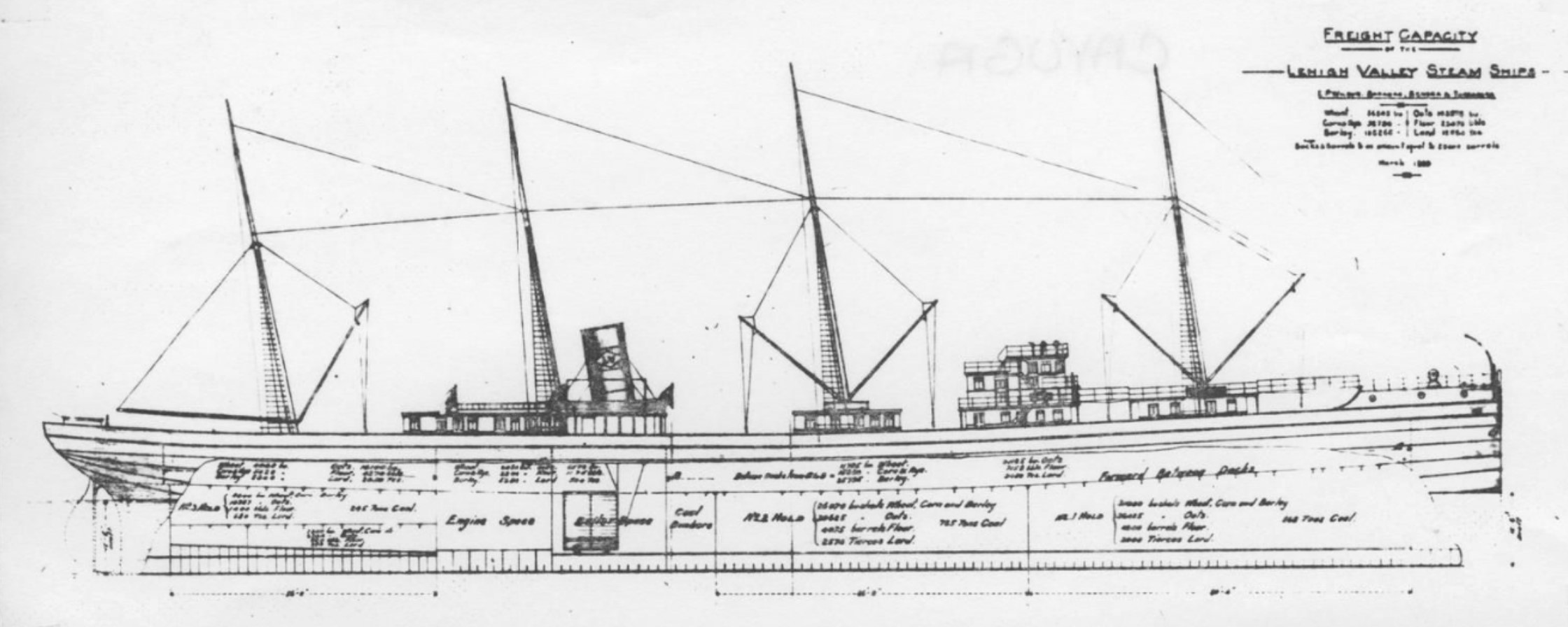
Cayuga's blueprints

Cayuga (US official number 126556) was built on the banks of the Cuyahoga River in 1889 in Cleveland, Ohio, by the Globe Iron Works Company. The second of five identical sister ships built between 1888 and 1890, she was one of the first steel freighters built on the Great Lakes, as well as the fourteenth steel ship built by the Globe Iron Works Company. (Note: Her sister ships were E.P. Wilbur (1888), Seneca (1889), Saranac (1890) and Tuscarora (1890).) Cayuga was named after Cayuga Creek, a stream in western New York. (Note: Cayuga and her sister ships (except E.P. Wilbur) were named after rivers in the eastern United States.)

Cayuga's overall hull length was 308.8 feet (94.1 m) (some sources state 306.8 feet (93.5 m) or 308 feet (94 m)) with a length between perpendiculars of 290 feet (88 m) (one source states 292.2 feet (89.1 m)). Her beam was 40.66 feet (12.39 m) (some sources state 40.8 feet (12.4 m) or 41 feet (12 m)) wide, while her hull was 23.5 feet (7.2 m) (some sources state 22.6 feet (6.9 m) or 25.5 feet (7.8 m)) deep. Cayuga's gross register tonnage was 2,669, with a net register tonnage of 1,939. She had a cargo capacity of about 3,000 long tons (3,000 t); when Cayuga was fully loaded, she had a draft of 16.5 feet (5.0 m).

She was powered by a 1,500-horsepower (1,100 kW) 85 rpm triple expansion steam engine. The cylinders of the engine were 24 inches (61 cm), 38 inches (97 cm) and 61 inches (150 cm) in diameter and had a stroke of 42 inches (110 cm). Steam for the engine was provided by two 11.1 by 12 feet (3.4 by 3.7 m) 160 pounds per square inch (1,100 kPa) Scotch marine boilers. Cayuga's engine and boilers were both built by the Globe Iron Works Company. She was propelled by a single, four-bladed, fixed-pitch propeller and had a top speed of about 14 miles per hour (12 kn). She cost $250,000 (equivalent to $7.88 million in 2024 (Note: Johnston, Louis & Williamson, Samuel H. (2023). "What Was the U.S. GDP Then?". MeasuringWorth. United States Gross Domestic Product deflator figures follow the MeasuringWorth series.)) to build.

=== Service history ===
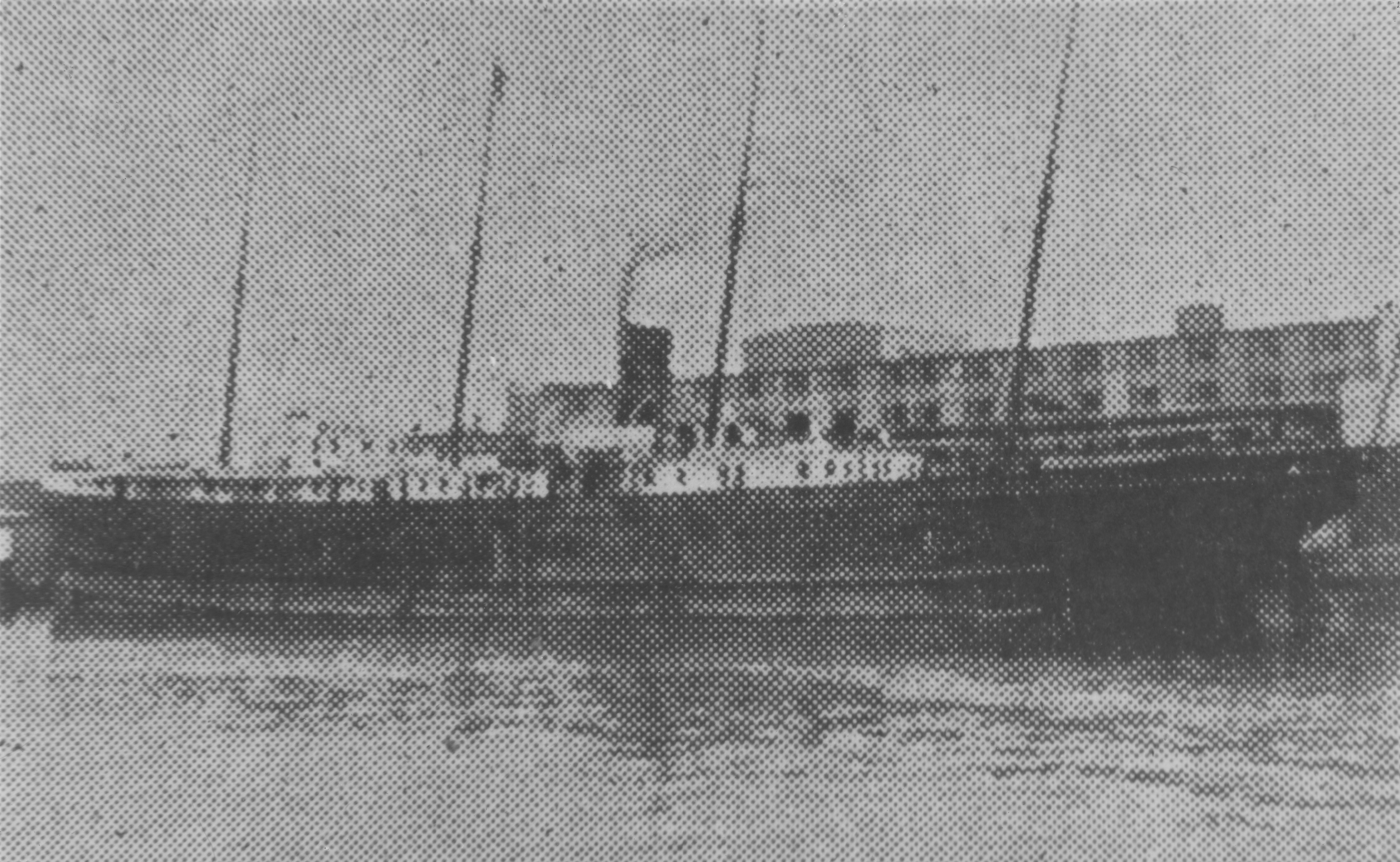
Cayuga in 1892

Commissioned by Buffalo's Lehigh Valley Transit Company whose fleet was managed by John Gordon and later W.P. Henry, Cayuga was launched on April 2, 1889 as yard number 24, and made her maiden voyage in May that same year. Although her home port was Buffalo, she was initially enrolled in Cleveland on May 31, 1889. She was re-enrolled in Buffalo on June 3, 1889. She carried package freight on her regular route between Buffalo and Chicago and made stops in Milwaukee, Wisconsin, and Gladstone, Michigan.

Throughout her career, Cayuga was involved in several accidents. The first occurred on April 9, 1890. She was unladen and left Buffalo harbor at around 4:00 p.m. towed by the tug S.W. Gee. Upon clearing the breakwater in a full gale, Cayuga became unmanageable. She drifted onto a shoal, broke free and onto the rocks at the foot of Georgia Street. Due to the storm, the life saving crew could not shoot a breeches buoy to Cayuga until the weather had abated and her stern was firmly aground. Cayuga was freed at around 9:00 a.m. by six tugs. Several of her keel plates were damaged; all of her propeller blades broke off; and she lost her rudder shoe.

In November 1891, Cayuga collided with the wooden package freighter Delaware off Cheboygan, Michigan.

=== Final voyage ===
On May 10, 1895, Cayuga, under the command of Captain George Graser, was bound for Buffalo with a cargo of 35,000 or 38,000 bushels of oats, flour and 1,500 pounds (680 kg) of general merchandise. Sources differ whether Cayuga was heading to Buffalo from Chicago or Milwaukee. One source states she left Buffalo for Milwaukee on May 5, and left Milwaukee at 8:00 a.m. on May 9. Meanwhile, the wooden freighter Joseph L. Hurd, commanded by Captain Charles E. Wilson, was bound from Duluth, Minnesota, for Chicago with a cargo of lumber (specifically pine boards) and package freight.

A thick fog obscured visibility as the wind distorted the sound of the vessels' fog whistles. When Cayuga and Joseph L. Hurd neared each other near Ile Aux Galets, they spotted each other's lights when they were about 10 miles (16 km) apart. The fog soon concealed the vessels from one other. At 4:00 or 4:30 a.m., when Cayuga and Joseph L. Hurd were less than 250 feet (76 m) apart, they were on a collision course. Cayuga's engine was reversed which only slowed her down rather of stopping her. Joseph L. Hurd crashed into Cayuga, tearing a hole 2 feet (0.61 m) wide and 6 feet (1.8 m) deep into her starboard side. Joseph L. Hurd lost 15 feet (4.6 m) of her bow, but was kept afloat by her cargo of pine boards. The force of the collision caused Cayuga to roll to port; she then righted herself, and began to sink. Cayuga went down in 25 minutes.

=== Aftermath ===
The crew of Cayuga and Joseph L. Hurd escaped in lifeboats and were picked up by the bulk freighter Manola. The only casualty of the accident was Joseph L. Hurd's cook/steward George Johnson, who fell overboard and drowned. The day after the collision, Joseph L. Hurd was towed to Harbor Springs, Michigan, by the wrecking tug Favorite. She was repaired and returned to service. Cayuga was insured for $175,000 (equivalent to $5.72 million in 2024) and her cargo was insured for $90,000 (equivalent to $2.94 million in 2024).

Lloyd's of London libeled Joseph L. Hurd's owners for $200,000 (equivalent to $6.54 million in 2024). The collision was determined to have been caused by mistaken passing signals. Captain Graser stated in a letter to supervising inspector general James Dumont that if Joseph L. Hurd had also reversed her engine, the collision would not have occurred.

== Cayuga wreck ==
=== Salvage attempts ===
The day after Cayuga sank, the Chicago Tribune stated that:

Among practical marine men, it was believed that the steamer [Cayuga] could ultimately be got afloat again, but it was thought the expense would amount to nearly all she was worth. The work must be done with pontoons, and will be a long, tedious job.

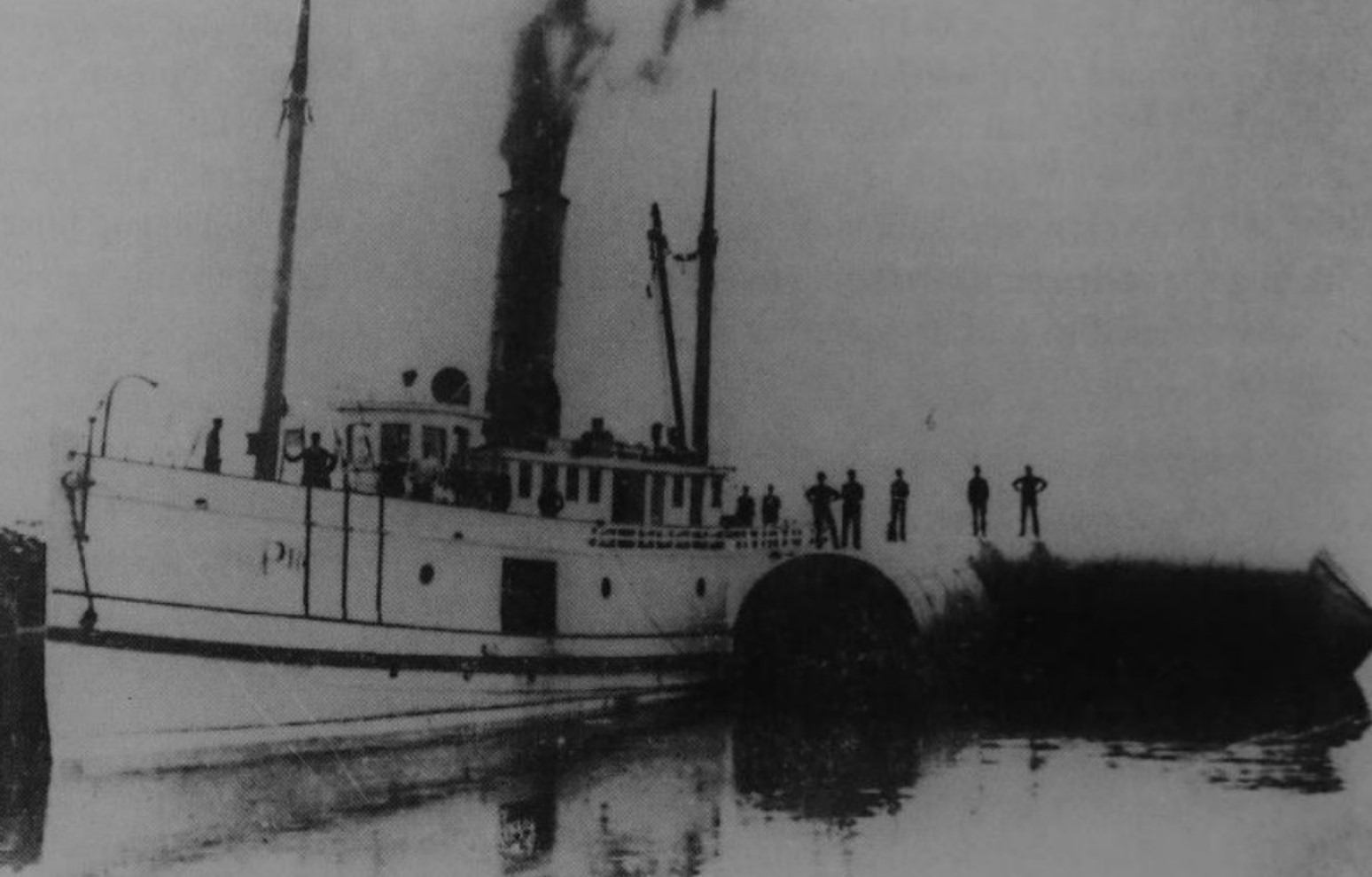
James Reid's tug Protector, with several pontoons, at Cayuga's wreck site

The first expedition attempting to locate Cayuga on May 13, 1895 was cancelled due to a gale. Several people searched for Cayuga after she sank. Five days after the incident, Captain Cyrus H. Sinclair of the Chicago-based C.A. McDonald & Company spent a day unsuccessfully searching for her. He concluded that her wreck lay in between 102 and 120 feet (31 and 37 m) of water, and doubted whether she could be raised. By June, the underwriters had offered a $1,000 (equivalent to $32,677 in 2024) reward to anyone who could find Cayuga's wreck. On June 18, Captain Wilbur of the package freighter City of Grand Haven abandoned his search for Cayuga after ten days.

On June 28, Captain Sinclair traveled to Cheboygan, to begin a new search. Using the tug George W. Cuyler, on June 30 he steamed to the position recorded by Captain Martin Swain of the wrecking tug Favorite. Sinclair planned to locate the wreck by dragging George W. Cuyler's anchor. A few minutes after Sinclair began searching for Cayuga, he managed to locate her, and planted a buoy at the wreck site. The following day, George W. Cuyler and the tug Major Dana recovered a flagpole, a boom and portions of Cayuga's bulwarks and rigging. For his efforts, Captain Sinclair was paid $2,000 (equivalent to $65,354 in 2024) by the underwriters.

By August 22, the underwriters had received bids from the Murphy Wrecking Company of Detroit, Michigan, and James Reid & Sons of Bay City, Michigan, to raise the wreck. On September 12, Captain James Reid signed a $100,000 (equivalent to $3.27 million in 2024) contract with the underwriters to raise Cayuga's wreck. Reid planned to start work on Cayuga in 1896, once the ice on Lake Michigan had melted.

Captain Reid planned to position eighteen 8-inch (20 cm) thick cables under Cayuga's hull, which would then be attached to a scow with a carrying capacity of 1,000 long tons (1,000 t). He also planned to attach eight steel pontoons (25 feet (7.6 m) (or 30 feet (9.1 m)) long and 13 feet (4.0 m) wide, with a lifting capacity of about 500 long tons (510 t) to Cayuga's wreck with thick cables, partially fill them with enough air to lift the wreck 8 to 10 feet (2.4 to 3.0 m) off the lake bottom, and then tow it into shallower water in Little Traverse Bay. There it would be patched up and pumped out. Most of the oats in Cayuga's cargo hold were recovered. In November, Captain Reid suspended the salvage operations, but claimed he would resume them in spring 1897. By February 1897, Captain Reid claimed to have spent more than $40,000 (equivalent to $1.29 million in 2024) on his salvage efforts. On June 9, Captain Reid managed to break Cayuga free from the mud where she was embedded. He continued to work on Cayuga's wreck until 1900, when he abandoned the salvage attempts.

Reid's salvage efforts were plagued by problems. The pontoons attached to her hull frequently broke free. Captain Reid and several of his divers sustained severe injuries and decompression sickness. One diver allegedly died when a derrick barge reportedly sank on top of him. The barge later sank completely when one of the air-filled pontoons broke free and shot to the surface. One tug used in the salvage operation burned. The salvage attempts nearly bankrupted Captain Reid's company.

=== Cayuga today ===
Cayuga's wreck

The wreck of Cayuga was re-discovered in spring 1969 by John Steele and Gene Turner of Illinois. Her wreck rests with a 35° port list in 102 feet (31 m) of water at the lake bottom, and 75 feet (23 m) to her deck, southwest of Grays Reef Light, near Ile Aux Galets. Her cabins no longer exist. The wreck is partially collapsed forward of the engine room with the bow broken away, and lying on its port side. Her stern is intact. The remains of Cayuga's cargo remain in her hold. There are also two spare propeller blades within the hull. Four of the pontoons used during the salvage attempts are still attached to Cayuga's hull and the sunken derrick barge lies off her port side. The air hose of the lost diver was reportedly still poking out from under the derrick barge when the wreck was found. Cayuga's wreck is protected by the 148-square-mile (380 km^{2}) Straits of Mackinac Shipwreck Preserve as part of an underwater museum.

== Sources ==
- "Cayuga (1889, Package Freighter)". Alpena, Michigan: Alpena County George N. Fletcher Public Library. 2021a.
- "Cayuga (1889, Package Freighter)". Alpena, Michigan: Alpena County George N. Fletcher Public Library. 2021b.
- "Cayuga". Bowling Green, Ohio: Bowling Green State University. 2021.
- "A Steamer Ashore". Buffalo Evening News. April 10, 1890 – via Maritime History of the Great Lakes.
- Amherstburg Echo (1895–1896). "Echo Soundings: Marine News of 1895–96". Amherstburg, Ontario: Marsh Collection Society.
- Beaver Island History (2021). "Cayuga" (PDF). Beaver Island, Michigan: Beaver Island Historical Society.
- Berry, Sterling (2021a). "Cayuga". Detroit, Michigan: Great Lakes Vessel Histories.
- Berry, Sterling (2021b). "E.P. Wilbur". Detroit, Michigan: Great Lakes Vessel Histories.
- Berry, Sterling (2021c). "Seneca". Detroit, Michigan: Great Lakes Vessel Histories.
- Berry, Sterling (2021d). "Saranac". Detroit, Michigan: Great Lakes Vessel Histories.
- Berry, Sterling (2021e). "Tuscarora". Detroit, Michigan: Great Lakes Vessel Histories.
- Bowlus, W. Bruce (2010). Iron Ore Transport on the Great Lakes: The Development of a Delivery System to Feed American Industry. Jefferson, North Carolina: McFarland & Company, Inc. ISBN 9780786486557.
- Bugbee, Gordon P. (February 1962a). "Iron Merchant Ships: An Upper Lakes Centennial - Part One" (PDF). Detroit, Michigan: Great Lakes Maritime Institute.
- Bugbee, Gordon P. (March 1962b). "Iron Merchant Ships: An Upper Lakes Centennial – Part Two" (PDF). Detroit, Michigan: Great Lakes Maritime Institute.
- Colton, Tim (2021). "Globe Iron Works, Cleveland OH". Shipbuilding History.
- Hanakova, Jitka (2021). "Freighter Cayuga". Milwaukee, Wisconsin: Shipwreck Explorers.
- Harrington, Steve (1998). Divers Guide to Michigan. St. Ignace, Michigan: Maritime Press & Great Lakes Diving Council, Inc. ISBN 0-9624629-8-5.
- Inland Lloyd's (1894). "The Inland Lloyds Vessel Register, 1894". Cleveland, Ohio: W. R. Smellie.
- Kohl, Cris (2005). The 100 Best Great Lakes Shipwrecks – Volume II. West Chicago, Illinois: Seawolf Communications. ISBN 978-0-9679-9766-7.
- Maritime History of the Great Lakes (1895a). "Cayuga (Propeller), U126556, sunk by collision, 10 May 1895". Ontario, Canada: Maritime History of the Great Lakes.
- Maritime History of the Great Lakes (1895b). "Two Steamers Collide, 13 May 1895". Ontario, Canada: Maritime History of the Great Lakes.
- McGreevy, Robert (2014). "The Cayuga". Harbor Beach, Michigan: Lakeshore Guardian. Archived from the original on May 20, 2021.
- Straits of Mackinac Shipwreck Preserve (2021). "Cayuga". Michigan: Straits of Mackinac Shipwreck Preserve.
- Swayze, David (2001). "Great Lakes Shipwrecks – C". Port Huron, Michigan: Boatnerd. Archived from the original on April 16, 2002.
- The Marine Record (1889a). "The Marine Record, April 4, 1889". Cleveland, Ohio: The Marine Record.
- The Marine Record (1889b). "The Marine Record, May 16, 1889". Cleveland, Ohio: The Marine Record.
- The Marine Record (1895a). "The Marine Record (Cleveland, OH1883), May 16, 1895". Cleveland, Ohio: The Marine Record.
- The Marine Record (1895b). "The Marine Record (Cleveland, OH1883), May 23, 1895". Cleveland, Ohio: The Marine Record.
- The Marine Record (1895c). "The Marine Record (Cleveland, OH1883), June 13, 1895". Cleveland, Ohio: The Marine Record.
- The Marine Record (1895d). "The Marine Record (Cleveland, OH1883), June 27, 1895". Cleveland, Ohio: The Marine Record.
- The Marine Record (1899). "The Marine Record (Cleveland, OH1883), June 15, 1899". Cleveland, Ohio: The Marine Record.
- The Marine Review (1892a). "The Marine Review (Cleveland, OH), 7 Apr 1892". Cleveland, Ohio: The Marine Review.
- The Marine Review (1892b). "The Marine Review (Cleveland, OH), 20 Oct 1892". Cleveland, Ohio: The Marine Review.
- The Marine Review (1895a). "The Marine Review (Cleveland, OH), 23 May 1895". Cleveland, Ohio: The Marine Review.
- The Marine Review (1895b). "The Marine Review (Cleveland, OH), 30 May 1895". Cleveland, Ohio: The Marine Review.
- The Marine Review (1895c). "The Marine Review (Cleveland, OH), 4 Jul 1895". Cleveland, Ohio: The Marine Review.
- The Marine Review (1895d). "The Marine Review (Cleveland, OH), 11 Jul 1895". Cleveland, Ohio: The Marine Review.
- The Marine Review (1895e). "The Marine Review (Cleveland, OH), 22 Aug 1895". Cleveland, Ohio: The Marine Review.
- The Marine Review (1895f). "The Marine Review (Cleveland, OH), 12 Sep 1895". Cleveland, Ohio: The Marine Review.
- The Marine Review (1896a). "The Marine Review (Cleveland, OH), 27 Feb 1896". Cleveland, Ohio: The Marine Review.
- The Marine Review (1896b). "The Marine Review (Cleveland, OH), 19 Mar 1896". Cleveland, Ohio: The Marine Review.
- The Marine Review (1896c). "The Marine Review (Cleveland, OH), 9 Jul 1896". Cleveland, Ohio: The Marine Review.
- The Marine Review (1896d). "The Marine Review (Cleveland, OH), 23 Jul 1896". Cleveland, Ohio: The Marine Review.
- The Marine Review (1896e). "The Marine Review (Cleveland, OH), 30 Jul 1896". Cleveland, Ohio: The Marine Review.
- The Marine Review (1896f). "The Marine Review (Cleveland, OH), 19 Nov 1896". Cleveland, Ohio: The Marine Review.
- The Marine Review (1897a). "The Marine Review (Cleveland, OH), 18 Feb 1897". Cleveland, Ohio: The Marine Review.
- The Marine Review (1897b). "The Marine Review (Cleveland, OH), 17 Jun 1897". Cleveland, Ohio: The Marine Review.
- The Marine Review (1897c). "The Marine Review (Cleveland, OH), 1 Jul 1897". Cleveland, Ohio: The Marine Review.
- The Marine Review (1898). "The Marine Review (Cleveland, OH), 13 Jan 1898". Cleveland, Ohio: The Marine Review.
- Thompson, Mark L. (1994). Queen of the Lakes. Detroit, Michigan: Wayne State University Press. ISBN 0-8143-2393-6.
