= Bay View massacre =

Violence at labor strike in Milwaukee

Coordinates: 42°59′58.0″N 87°53′22.8″W

- Wisconsin Historical Marker
- Date: May 5, 1886
- Location: Milwaukee, Wisconsin
- Goals: Eight-hour day
- Methods: Strikes, protest, demonstrations

Parties
Knights of Labor	Wisconsin National Guard

Lead figures
	Jeremiah McLain Rusk

Number
14,000 protesters	250+ Wisconsin National Guard

Casualties and losses
- Deaths: 7 Injuries: Arrests: Deaths: Injuries:

The Bay View massacre was the result of a strike held on May 4, 1886, by 7,000 building-trades workers and 5,000 Polish laborers who had organized at St. Stanislaus Catholic Church in Milwaukee, Wisconsin, to strike against their employers, demanding the enforcement of an eight-hour work day.

By Monday, May 3, the number of participants had increased to over 14,000 workers who gathered at the Milwaukee Iron Company rolling mill in Bay View. They were met by 250 National Guardsmen under order from Republican Governor Jeremiah M. Rusk. The strikers had shut down every business in the city except the North Chicago Rolling Mills in Bay View. The guardsmen's orders were that, if the strikers were to enter the Mills, they should shoot to kill. But when the captain received the order it had a different meaning: he ordered his men to pick out a man and shoot to kill when the order was given. Workers camped in the nearby fields and the Kosciuszko Militia arrived by May 4. Early the next day the crowd, which by this time contained children, approached the mill and were fired upon. Seven people died as a result, including a thirteen-year-old boy. Several more were injured during the protest. Several contradictory newspaper accounts described other possible casualties, but the count of seven deaths is substantiated by specific names (Frank Kunkel, Frank Nowarczyk, John Marsh, Robert Erdman, Johann Zazka, Martin Jankowiak, and Michael Ruchalski).

Since 1986, members of the Bay View Historical Society, the Wisconsin Labor History Society, and other community groups have held a commemorative event to honor the memories of those killed during the incident. The event is held every year on the first Sunday in May, at the State Historical Marker site at the intersection of Superior Street and Russell Avenue, within view of the former rolling mill location.

== See also ==
- Paul Grottkau
- Anti-union violence
- Bay View, Milwaukee
- Murder of workers in labor disputes in the United States
- List of incidents of civil unrest in the United States
