= Sport (shipwreck) =

Tugboat wrecked in Lake Huron

- SPORT (tug) Shipwreck Site
- U.S. National Register of Historic Places
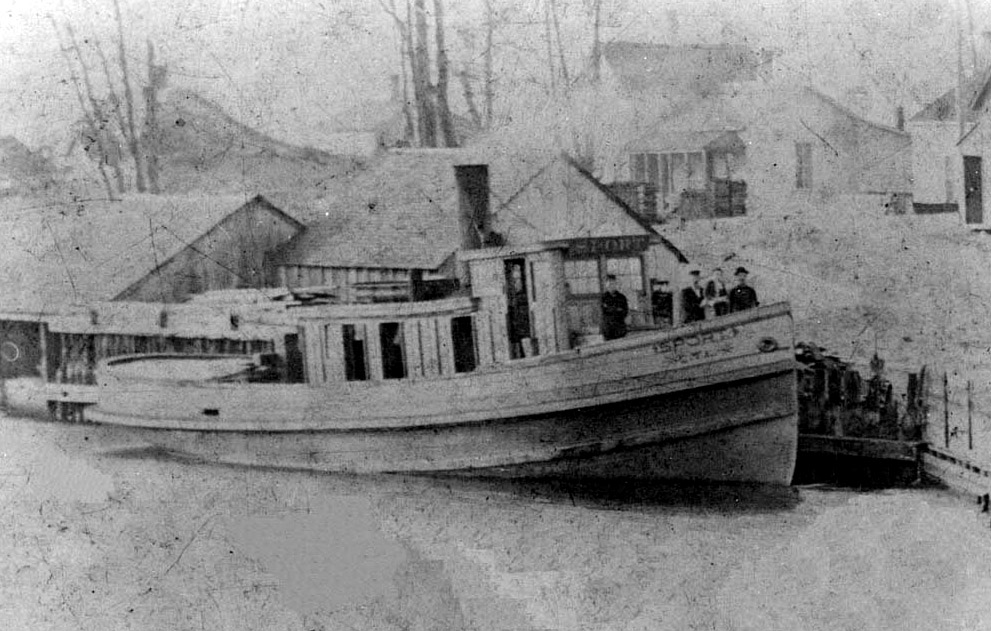
- Sport, 1899

- Location within Michigan Location within the United States
- Location: In Lake Huron, three miles east of Lexington, Michigan
- Coordinates: 43°25′53″N 82°27′54″W
- Area: 0.5 acres (0.20 ha)
- Built: 1873
- Built by: Wyandotte Iron Ship Building Works
- Architect: Frank E. Kirby
- Architectural style: Steel-hulled tug
- NRHP reference No.: 92001503
- Added to NRHP: October 29, 1992

Sport was a tugboat, built in 1873 and wrecked in 1920 in Lake Huron, in the United States. The wreck site, designated 20UH105, was listed on the National Register of Historic Places in 1992.

== History ==
In 1873, lumber and steel entrepreneur Eber Brock Ward commissioned Frank E. Kirby to design this tug. The boat was built by the Wyandotte Iron Ship Building Works in Wyandotte, Michigan. The Sport was the first steel tug on the Great Lakes, and the first vessel made of Bessemer steel in North America. It was designed as a harbor tug, and first used around Wyandotte and the St. Clair River. By 1875, she was assigned to Ludington, Michigan, where Ward owned sawmills. The tug was rebuilt a number of times, and sold to a succession of owners who used it for towing, salvaging and aiding vessels in distress.

In 1913, the Sport was sold a final time to Captain Robert Thompson of Port Huron, Michigan. Thompson used it as a fire tug in Port Huron, and for other harbor duties.

On December 13, 1920, the Sport set out from Port Huron, bound for Harbor Beach. It encountered a heavy gale, and by 6:00 pm was taking on more water than could be pumped out. The seasick and exhausted firetender returned to his bunk, and the boat lost steam, killing the pumps. The crew abandoned ship at about 11:00 pm, and washed ashore near Lexington, still alive.

The wreck of the Sport was discovered in 1987. In 1992, the Sport became the first Michigan shipwreck with her own Michigan Historical Marker placed on her. The wreck is now part of the Sanilac Shores Underwater Preserve, and popular with divers. The marker was damaged and removed in 2002.

== Description ==
The Sport was 57 feet (17 m) long, with a beam of 14 feet (4.3 m), and a depth of 9 feet (2.7 m). It was assessed at 23 net register tons (NRT) and 45 gross register tons (GRT). The boat had an iron frame with a steel hull over it.

The wreck is in 45 feet (14 m) of water, with the hull resting upright, listing slightly to starboard. The upper sections of the tug project 20 feet (6.1 m) off the bottom. The boat is intact, and a number of tools and relics are scattered around the site.
