= Village Roots Garden =

Community garden located in the Bay View neighborhood of Milwaukee, Wisconsin

Coordinates: 42.9986°N 87.8953°W

- Interactive map of Village Roots Garden
- Type: Garden

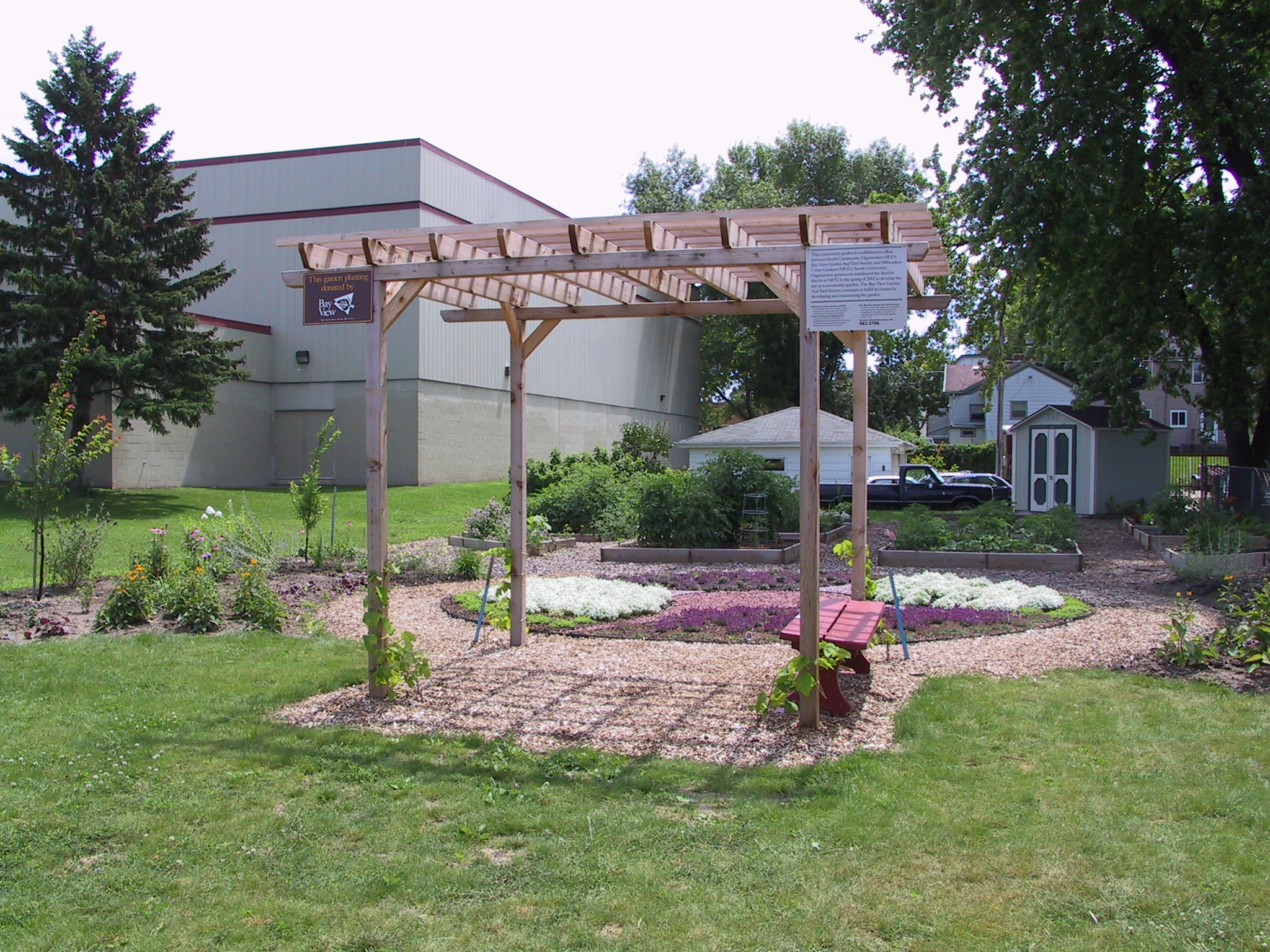
Entrance to the Village Roots Garden.

The Village Roots Garden is a community garden located at 1115 E. Otjen Street in the Bay View neighborhood of Milwaukee, Wisconsin.

== History and garden development ==
The Village Roots Garden (originally known as the Otjen Garden) came about through the collaboration of the Bay View Garden and Yard Society, Milwaukee Urban Gardens (MUG), and the South Community Organization.

On February 20, 2002, the South Community Organization donated the vacant lot to Milwaukee Urban Gardens, a nonprofit land trust. The lot became Milwaukee Urban Garden’s first owned property, and the Bay View Garden and Yard Society (an LGBT and gay-friendly organization) soon began developing the empty lot into Bay View’s first community garden.

The Bay View Garden and Yard Society members provided the labor, maintenance, and most of the plants for the land, and hired a landscaper to create a blueprint for the property. To prepare the lot, members dedicated their time and sweat equity to removing brush, cutting down trees, hauling topsoil and mulch, and keeping up with crops of weeds. In 2002, the group laid out the garden pathways and constructed the raised vegetable and flowerbeds for rental to the community.

In 2003, more pathways were plotted and beds for support plantings were added. Near the back of the lot, a communal raspberry patch was planted; and a tool shed was built at the rear corner of the site to store gardening tools and materials for both member and renter use. A no-mow grass lawn was planted at the front of the lot to provide a low maintenance entrance to the garden, and another patch was planted at rear of the lot to be used as a staging area for demonstrations and instruction. As a central sculptural feature to the site, a large compass design was mapped out using crushed rock for the compass points; and next spring two varieties of thyme were planted to fill in the areas between the points of the compass. Near the end of the year, the group officially renamed the Otjen Street site as the Village Roots Garden.

In 2004, the majority of the peripheral gardens were completed, including large plantings of fruit trees, shrubs, and perennials to attract birds and butterflies. The group also enlisted the aid of Americorps volunteers to build a cedar pergola near the garden entrance, and grape vines were then planted at the base of each post.

With the majority of the gardens established, a formal dedication ceremony attended by local dignitaries was held on June 26, 2005 to commemorate the completion of the Village Roots Garden and to celebrate the 10th anniversary of the Bay View Garden and Yard Society.

Since that time, the group continues to maintain and develop the site. An asparagus bed was added in 2006, and a selection of woodland plants and ephemerals were planted in the shady areas near the garden shed. In 2007, a row of pampas grass was planted to serve as a natural fence along the rear lot-line, and beds of sedum and spring flowering bulbs were established near the street curb. In 2008, permanent cedar benches were added at each end of the pergola to give visitors a resting spot to enjoy the gardens from the shade of the grape vines. In 2009, the group received a large donation of perennial flowers from a vendor at the Bay View Plant Sale. In 2010, compost bins were installed at the site.

In an effort to promote community participation and environmental awareness, the group continues to sponsor occasional meetings, celebrations, and garden tours at the site. The community garden is also one of the stops on the annual MUG Fall Community Garden Tour.

== The gardens ==
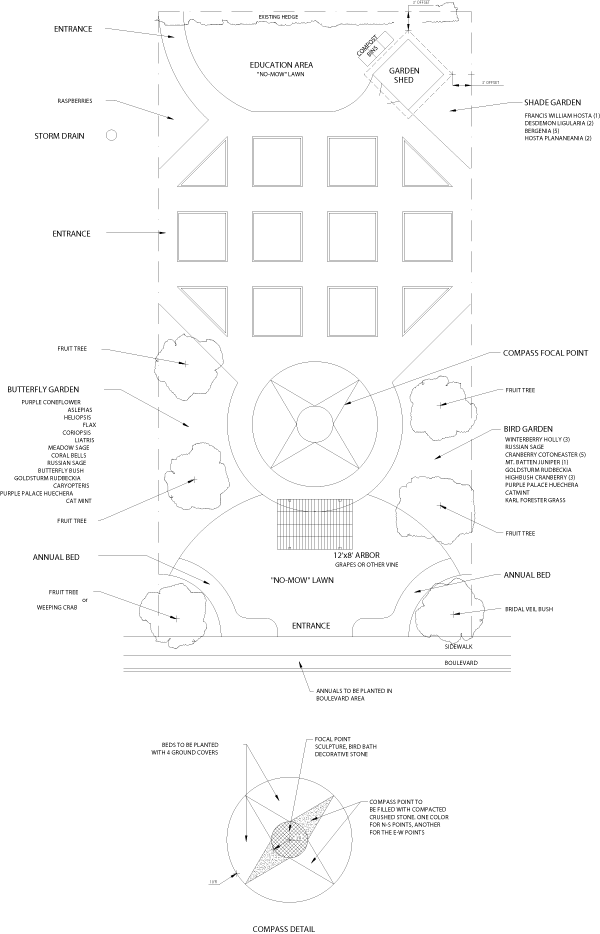
Drawing of the garden layout.

The Village Roots Garden site was designed to incorporate elements of a standard community garden along with the aesthetics of show-garden beds to provide visual appeal and a welcoming environment.

At the entrance to the garden are a no-mow lawn and a cedar pergola covered with grape vines. Flanking this area are large permanent gardens with fruit trees and shrubs (crabapple, cherry, plum, holly) to provide food and shelter for birds; under-planted with both shade and sun loving perennials (catmint, rudbeckia, purple coneflowers, bee balm, heuchera, dianthus) to attract bees and butterflies.

Immediately behind the pergola is another sculptural element: a 12-foot-diameter (3.7 m) compass design made of crushed stone, inter-planted with several varieties of thyme.

The core of the site consists of eight 8-foot square raised community garden beds that are rented annually for a nominal fee, and 4 triangular raised trial-garden beds maintained by the group. The rental beds are tilled and amended yearly in preparation for the planting season, and renters have access to a nearby water source and free use of the garden tools stored in the shed. The 4 smaller trial beds are planted with asparagus, strawberries, flowering bulbs, and woodland plants.

Just past the rental beds is another no-mow lawn area used as a staging area for gardening demonstrations, and the occasional outdoor group meeting. In the rear corner of the site is a garden shed surrounded by more shade-loving woodland plants, and the rear of the lot is delineated by a natural fence of pampas grass, and a large raspberry bed.

== See also ==
- Rochester Community Garden
