= SS Eber Ward =

Package freighter sunk in the Straits of Mackinac

SS Eber Ward was a package freighter that served ports on the Upper Great Lakes from her launching in 1888 until she sank in the Straits of Mackinac on April 20, 1909, with the loss of five lives. The sunken cargo ship is a feature of the present-day Straits of Mackinac Shipwreck Preserve.

== History ==
Eber Ward was built by the F. W. Wheeler & Co. yard in West Bay City, Michigan. Launched in the spring of 1888, she was named after shipowner and industrialist Eber Brock Ward. She was registered in Detroit, Michigan, on July 21, 1888 as a package freighter for the Detroit & Lake Superior Line. Her tonnage was 1,344 gross register tons and 1,038 net register tons. She was 213 feet (65 m) long and had a draft of 22 feet (6.7 m).

After 21 years of service and several changes of ownership, Eber Ward sank in the Straits of Mackinac west of Mackinaw City, Michigan, on the morning of April 20, 1909. Nine survivors from the steamboat's crew of 14 officers and men recalled that the vessel had run into thick pack ice. Accusations were made that Captain Timese Lemay, who confessed later that he had thought the ice was "slush", had been running his boat much too fast for conditions. The United States Steamboat Inspection Service, which conducted an inquiry into the sinking, found Lemay "guilty of misconduct, negligence and inattention to duties." The derelict captain had his master's license revoked.

The wreck was rediscovered by divers in 1980. The five persons killed in the sinking are memorialized by the vessel's wreck, which now forms part of the Straits of Mackinac Shipwreck Preserve.

The five people who perished aboard the SS Eber Ward are: James Perry, watchman; John Leubrath, fireman; John Hern; Kinney McKay, deckhand; unnamed person. The survivors are: Captain Timese LeMay, Detroit; A. P. Callino, first mate; Frank Baldwin, Detroit, chief engineer; S. R. Shipman, second engineer; Charles Lester and Frank Gutch, wheelswmen; John Winterhaler, steward; Mrs. Winterhaler, Detroit (John's wife); August Palmer, deckhand.
