= Iron Well =

Iron Well may refer to:

- the Iron Well in Bruck an der Mur, Austria
- Pryor Avenue Iron Well, Bay View Historic District of Milwaukee, Wisconsin, US
