= Sanilac Shores Underwater Preserve =

Underwater Preserve

- Location within Michigan
- Location: Lake Huron, Sanilac County, Michigan USA
- Nearest city: Port Sanilac, Michigan
- Coordinates: 43°25′55″N 82°24′43″W
- Area: 163 square miles (420 km^{2})
- Governing body: Michigan Department of Natural Resources

The Sanilac Shores Underwater Preserve was established to promote conservation of the submerged historical resources in Lake Huron near Port Sanilac, Michigan. The Sanilac Shores Underwater Preserve spans a total of 163 square miles (420 km^{2}) of Lake Huron. The Michigan Underwater Preserve Council oversees activities relating to all of Michigan's Underwater Preserves.

The preserve is open to scuba divers.

== History ==
Port Sanilac was originally a lumberjack settlement on the shore of Lake Huron named "Bark Shanty Point." In 1857 the village was renamed to Port Sanilac, as it is in Sanilac County and Sanilac Township, Michigan. Local legend attributes the name to a Wyandotte Indian Chief named Sanilac. Local landmarks include the Port Sanilac lighthouse (burning kerosene from its opening in 1886 until its electrification in 1924) and a twenty-room Victorian mansion (now a museum) built in 1850 by a horse-and-buggy doctor, Dr. Joseph Loop. There are numerous shipwrecks located near Port Sanilac.

Sanilac Shores Unit Sites
Site name	Type	Sank	Depth	Coordinates
Charles A. Street	Wooden Steamer	July 20, 1908	10'	43°35.50′N 82°27.50′W
Charles S. Price	Steel Freighter	November 9, 1913	75'	43°09.174′N 82°21.174′W
Checotah	Wooden Schooner	October 30, 1906	117'	43°36.107′N 82°28.170′W
City of Genoa	Wooden Steamer	August 26, 1911	64'	43°08.78′N 82°22.31′W
Colonel A. B. Williams	Wooden Schooner	1864	80'	43°36.235′N 82°30.805′W
Eliza H. Strong	Wooden Steamer	October 26, 1904	22'	43°15.709′N 82°30.581′W
F.B. Gardner	Wooden Steamer	September 15, 1904	55'	43°31.63′N 82°31.77′W
John Breeden	Wooden Schooner	July 21, 1899	55'	43°12.640′N 82°26.240′W
City of Milwaukee	Wooden Schooner	November 5. 1875	165'	Unknown
Mary Alice B.	Steel Tugboat	September 5, 1975	92'	43°22.309′N 82°26.301′W
Canisteo	Wooden Steamer	October 25, 1920	98'	43°14.142′N 82°18.292′W
New York	Wooden Steamer	September 1856	117'	43°36.23′N 82°28.272′W
North Star	Steel Freighter	November 25, 1908	96'	43°23.954′N 82°26.524′W
Queen City	Steel Steamer	August 18, 1863	45'	43°09.124′N 82°25.711′W
Regina	Steel Canaler	November 9, 1913	77'	43°20.434′N 82°26.787′W
Sport	Steel Hulled Tug	December 13, 1920	45'	43°16.003′N 82°27.892′W

== See also ==
- Michigan Underwater Preserves
