= Marquette Underwater Preserve =

Protected area in Michigan, United States

- Location within Michigan
- Location: Lake Superior, Marquette County, Michigan USA
- Nearest city: Marquette, Michigan
- Coordinates: 46°47′10″N 87°34′59″W
- Area: 144 sq mi (370 km^{2})
- Governing body: Michigan Department of Natural Resources

The Marquette Underwater Preserve was established in 1990 to promote conservation of the submerged historical resources in Lake Superior near Marquette, Michigan. The preserve is composed of two separate units, the Marquette Unit and the Huron Islands Unit. The Marquette Unit extends along approximately 24 miles of Michigan shoreline out to the 200-foot depth contour. The Huron Islands Unit surrounds a group of granite peaks about 12 miles from shore. The Michigan Underwater Preserve Council oversees activities relating to all of Michigan's underwater preserves.

The preserve is open to scuba divers.

== History ==
Marquette, Michigan became a major shipping port after iron ore was discovered in the area in 1844, and marine traffic in the area has been heavy ever since. Heavy traffic combined with not-too-uncommon thick fog and gale force winds has resulted in numerous shipwrecks.

Marquette Unit Sites
Site name	Type	Depth (ft)	Depth (m)	Coordinates
Charles James Kershaw	Wooden Propeller Steamer	25	7.6	46°30.56′N 87°21.81′W
D. Leuty	Wooden Propeller Steamer	40	12	46°32.76′N 87°22.44′W
DeSoto	Wooden Bark	8–10	2.4–3.0	46°32.07′N 87°23.55′W
F-106B	Fighter Plane wreck debris	20–22	6.1–6.7	46°31.71′N 87°23.75′W
Florida	Wooden Schooner	10–15	3.0–4.6	46°32.11′N 87°23.53′W
George Sherman	Wooden Schooner	10–12	3.0–3.7	46°29.89′N 87°9.63′W
The "Gold Mine" Pinnacle	Pinnacle of granite	12–150	3.7–45.7	46°35.38′N 87°21.75′W
"Iron Man" & J.H. Sheadle	Shipwreck debris	15	4.6	46°34.08′N 87°23.17′W
Queen City	Wooden Schooner	10–13	3.0–4.0	46°29.42′N 87°18.64′W
Superior & Marion L.	Wooden Fishing Tugs	20	6.1	46°32.50′N 87°23.35′W

Huron Island Unit Sites
Site name	Type	Depth (ft)	Depth (m)	Coordinates
Arctic	Wooden Sidewheel Steamer	5–100	1.5–30.5	46°57.74′N 87°59.85′W
George Nester	Wooden Schooner-Barge	20–100	6.1–30.5	46°57.99′N 88°00.20′W
Southwest	Wooden Schooner	100	30	46°56.42′N 87°56.11′W
Launch Huron Island	Wooden Gas Launch	15	4.6	46°56.42′N 87°56.11′W

== See also ==
- Michigan Underwater Preserves
