= Bay View Historical Society =

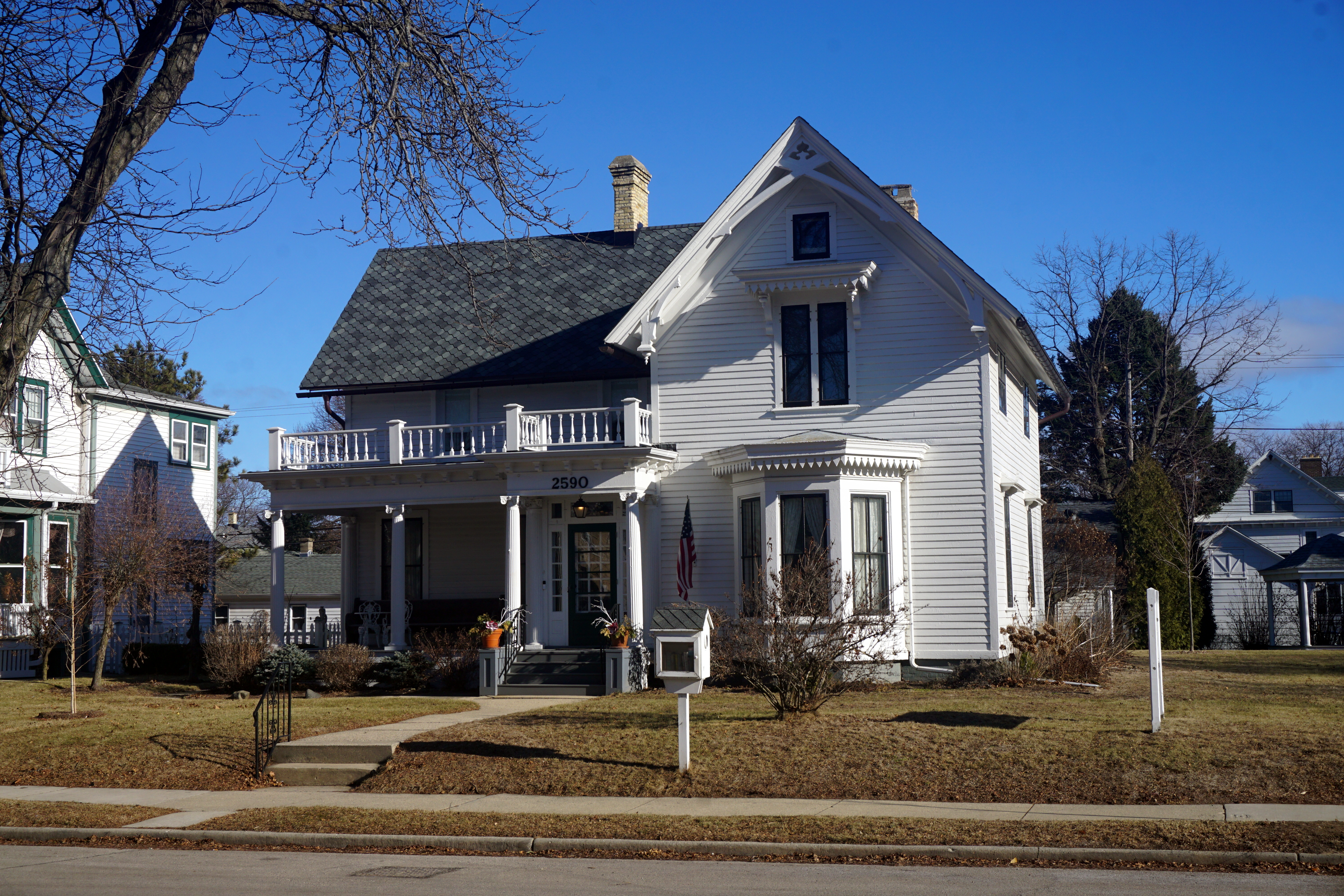
Beulah Brinton House

The Bay View Historical Society was established in 1979 to preserve the character and heritage of the neighborhood of Bay View in Milwaukee, Wisconsin.

== Description ==
Incorporated in 1879, the working class village of Bay View was later annexed by the City of Milwaukee by 1887. While it has been part of the city for over a century, Bay View remains a distinct community with its own history.

Established in 1979, the Bay View Historical Society is a non-profit organization that consists of volunteers dedicated to preserving and promoting the heritage of the Bay View neighborhood in Milwaukee, Wisconsin. Started by two neighbors (Paul Kohlbeck and Audrey Quinsey) during a chance conversation in their alley, the Bay View Historical Society is now incorporated and operates under a set bylaws. The Bay View Historical Society occupies the renovated Beulah Brinton House. This former home of Warren and Beulah Brinton was an early gathering place when Beulah organized the first library and other social activities from it.

== Accomplishments ==
The Bay View Historical Society has made progress in preserving and making public the diverse and dynamic history of Bay View. They have restored the area surrounding the Pryor Avenue Iron Well and designated historical landmarks at the following locations: Beulah Brinton House, Bay View United Methodist Church, Bay View Rolling Mill, Puddler's Hall, St. Augustine School, St. Lucas Lutheran Church, Estes Home, Kneisler's White House Tavern, Club Garibaldi, Trowbridge Street School, Dover Street School, European Copper Beech Tree, Immaculate Conception Church, and the Keller Winery. Two independent series of music concerts are held at the house each year. The house itself and outdoor gazebo are available for concerts, meetings, weddings, and community events.

== See also ==
- List of historical societies in Wisconsin
