= Beulah Brinton House =

Historic house in Wisconsin, United States

- U.S. Historic district – Contributing property
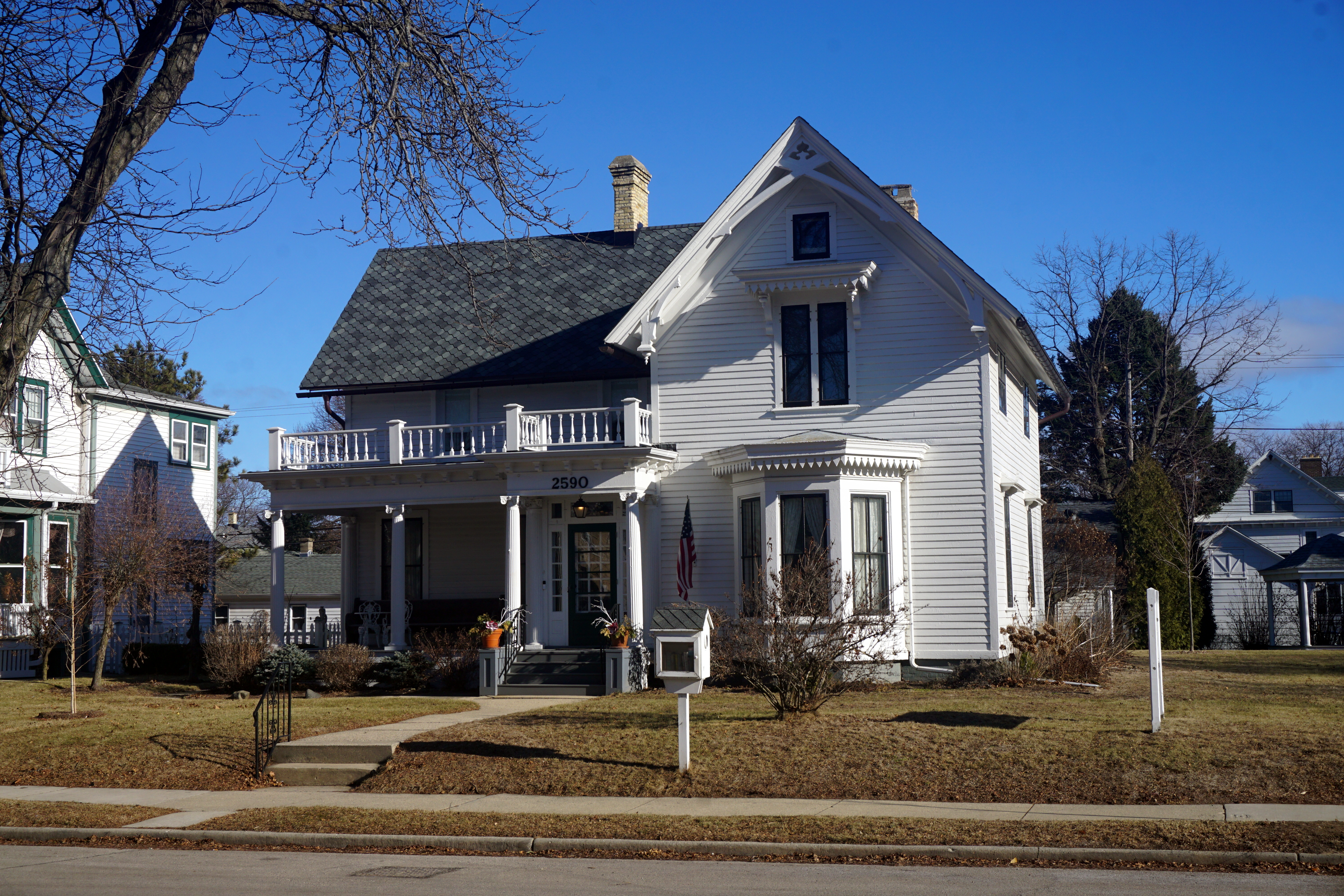
- The Beulah Brinton House

- Location within Wisconsin Location within the United States
- Location: 2590 S. Superior Street; Milwaukee, Wisconsin
- Coordinates: 42°59′52″N 87°53′16″W
- Built: 1870
- Part of: Bay View Historic District (ID82000686)
- Designated CP: August 23, 1982

The Beulah Brinton House is a historically and architecturally significant house at 2590 S. Superior Street in the Bay View neighborhood of Milwaukee, Wisconsin, United States.

== History ==
Beulah Brinton was an admired and important figure in Bay View's early history. In the 1870s new immigrant workers (primarily from England, Ireland, Scotland, Wales, and Italy) flocked to Bay View to work at the Bay View Rolling Mill. As recent immigrants, they usually did not speak English, sometimes needed medical assistance, and were homesick and in need of recreation and a community. Brinton welcomed the workers and their families into her home, where she taught them how to read, sew, and perform other valuable skills.

In Milwaukee, Brinton organized neighbors’ relief efforts after the Great Chicago Fire of October 1871 and sought in 1886 to reconcile all parties in the wake of May’s National Guard shootings of a group agitating for the 8-hour workday.

To introduce Bay View residents to tennis, she built a tennis court in her side yard so they could learn and play the sport, which was relatively new to the United States. She kept tennis rackets in a box on her back porch so they were readily available. Brinton encouraged theater, and often played the piano so that couples could dance. Her collection of over 300 books became the first library in Bay View. What Brinton did with her home was similar to the efforts Jane Addams put into the more renowned Hull House (though Beulah Brinton house activities pre-date the Hull House).

When a neighborhood community center opened in 1924 in a former firehouse on Saint Clair Street, it was considered a direct continuation of her home service and named for her. Brinton came from Chicago to speak at its dedication; a proclamation for the event and a portrait of Brinton grace the lobby of a newer Beulah Brinton Center on Bay Street.

Beulah returned to her old home in 1926 to live with the family of her granddaughter Mabel Pickard and Ray Estes and died there in 1928. The Brinton house now serves as headquarters of the Bay View Historical Society.

== Today ==
The Beulah Brinton House is the headquarters for the Bay View Historical Society. It is frequently used in Society functions. The Bay View Historical Society Archives are upstairs, and are available for viewing during the afternoon of every third Saturday of the month. The Beulah Brinton house contains an archive of antiques in the home, including dresses, hats, photos, and paintings from the 1870s.
