= Straits of Mackinac Shipwreck Preserve =

State preserve located in the Mackinac Strait

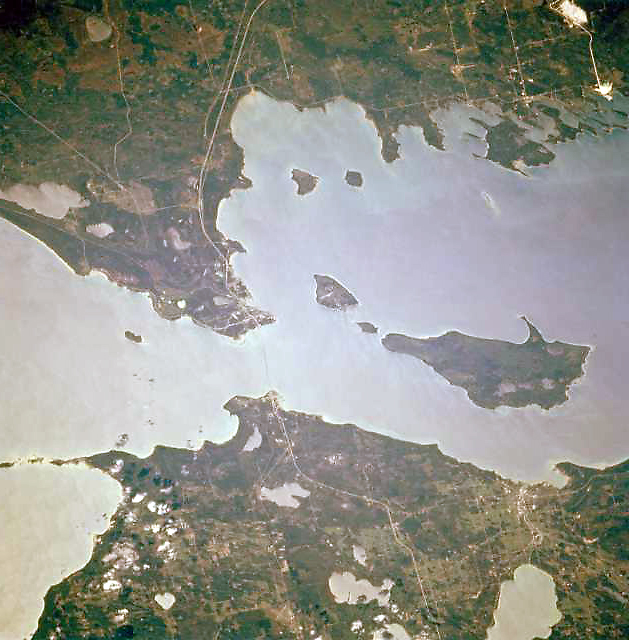
- Aerial view of the waters protected within the Straits of Mackinac Shipwreck Preserve.

- Location within Michigan
- Location: Lake Huron, Lake Michigan, Cheboygan County, Emmet County, Mackinac County, Michigan, USA
- Nearest city: Mackinaw City, Michigan
- Coordinates: 45°48′51″N 84°44′56″W
- Area: 148 square miles (380 km^{2})
- Governing body: Michigan Department of Natural Resources

The Straits of Mackinac Shipwreck Preserve is a 148-square-mile (380 km^{2}) state preserve in and around the Straits of Mackinac. The preserve is divided in two by the Mackinac Bridge. The waters of the preserve include the waters offshore from Mackinaw City and St. Ignace, as well as all or part of the shorelines of Bois Blanc Island, Mackinac Island, Round Island, and St. Helena Island.

The preserve contains at least twenty-two diveable wrecks marked with buoys, with several deeper unmarked wrecks and more just outside the official boundaries. There are also a number of shallow sites suitable for snorkeling and kayak visits. Frequent fog and congested shipping added to the count of shipwrecks in the Straits area. Half a dozen lighthouses in and around the preserve testify to the dangers that existed prior to the invention of radar in the 1940s. However, tragedies have continued. One modern wreck within the boundaries of the preserve is Cedarville, a lake freighter transporting limestone that sank in 1965 after a collision.

Divers also visit underwater formations of Mackinac breccia near Mackinac Island; one such formation, the "Rock Maze", is offshore from Arch Rock. Further east off Arch Rock, a drowned, 100-foot (30 m)-high waterfall formation, Mackinac Falls, was discovered in August 2007.

== Known wrecks within the preserve ==
Wreck name	Depth	GPS/LAT/LON
Cayuga	75 to 102 ft (23 to 31 m)	45°43.239′N 085°11.401′W
Cedarville	40 to 110 ft (12 to 34 m)	45°47.235′N 084°40.248′W
Eber Ward	111 to 145 ft (34 to 44 m)	45°48.763′N 084°49.133′W
Fred McBrier	96 to 104 ft (29 to 32 m)	45°48.342′N 085°55.301′W
Maitland	85 ft (26 m)	45°48.249′N 085°52.555′W
Minneapolis	124 ft (38 m)	45°48.511′N 084°43.904′W
Newell Eddy	165 ft (50 m)	45°46.890′N 084°13.810′W
Northwest	75 ft (23 m)	45°47.450′N 084°51.465′W
Rock Maze	0 to 35 ft (0 to 11 m)	45°51.803′N 084°36.410′W
Sandusky	70 to 85 ft (21 to 26 m)	45°47.959′N 084°50.249′W
M. Stalker	85 ft (26 m)	45°47.620′N 084°41.062′W
(formerly known as) St. Andrew	62 ft (19 m)	45°42.051′N 084°31.795′W
Uganda	185 to 207 ft (56 to 63 m)	45°50.553′N 085°02.998′W
William H. Barnum	58 to 75 ft (18 to 23 m)	45°44.708′N 084°37.866′W
William Young	120 ft (37 m)	45°48.777′N 084°41.923′W

== See also ==
- Michigan Underwater Preserves
- Old Mackinac Point Light
- Round Island Light (Michigan)
- St. Helena Island Light
