= Alger Underwater Preserve =

Preservation area in Michigan, US

- Location within Michigan
- Location: Lake Superior, Alger County, Michigan USA
- Nearest city: Munising, Michigan
- Coordinates: 46.504°N 86.559°W
- Governing body: Michigan Department of Natural Resources

The Alger Underwater Preserve is a preservation area in the U.S. state of Michigan. Located in Lake Superior, it protects waters that lie offshore the Pictured Rocks National Lakeshore and the Grand Island National Recreation Area.

== Pictured Rocks ==
The Pictured Rocks, although an exceptionally scenic section of Lake Superior shoreline, offers very little shelter to storm-beset boat traffic of all kinds; over the years, some of these boats and Lake freighters have wrecked. In addition, all boat traffic into and out of the county seat of Munising, Michigan, a noted port for shipping timber, cut lumber and paper products since the late 1800s, passes through the Alger Underwater Preserve. The Alger Underwater Preserve protects the wrecks that are located within its boundaries.
