= Southwest Michigan Underwater Preserve =

Preservation area in the United States

- Location within Michigan
- Location: Lake Michigan, Allegan County, Berrien County, Van Buren County, Michigan, USA
- Nearest city: Benton Harbor, Michigan
- Coordinates: 42°08′31″N 86°31′44″W
- Governing body: Michigan Department of Natural Resources

The Southwest Michigan Underwater Preserve is a preservation area in Michigan in the United States. Located in Lake Michigan, it protects a five-mile-wide strip of water offshore from Michigan's Allegan, Berrien, and Van Buren counties. This includes the waters offshore the port towns of Benton Harbor, Holland, St. Joseph, and South Haven, all in Michigan. Many shipwrecks litter these waters.
