= Grand Traverse Bay Bottomland Preserve =

Preservation area in Michigan, US

Grand Traverse Bay Underwater Preserve
- Location within Michigan
- Location: Grand Traverse Bay, Grand Traverse County, Antrim County, Leelanau County, Michigan USA
- Nearest city: Traverse City, Michigan
- Coordinates: 45.032°N 85.474°W
- Area: 295 square miles (760 km^{2})
- Established: 2008
- Governing body: Michigan Department of Natural Resources

The Grand Traverse Bay Underwater Preserve is a preservation area that encompasses all of Grand Traverse Bay, a bay of Lake Michigan, in the U.S. state of Michigan. It is 295 square miles (760 km^{2}) in size and is located off Traverse City, Michigan.

== Description ==
The Grand Traverse Bay Great Lakes State Underwater Preserve protects bottomlands off Traverse City and the Old Mission Peninsula of Grand Traverse County, the western shore of Antrim County bordering on Grand Traverse Bay's East Arm, and the eastern shore of Leelanau County bordering on Grand Traverse Bay's West Arm.

Wrecks located in the Grand Traverse Preserve include the schooner Metropolis, which sank off Old Mission Peninsula while carrying a cargo of lumber to Chicago in November 1886. Remains of the wreck were surveyed in 2009.

In June 2008, the Grand Traverse Bay Underwater Preserve was listed as Michigan's 12th underwater preserve.
