= Pryor Avenue Iron Well =

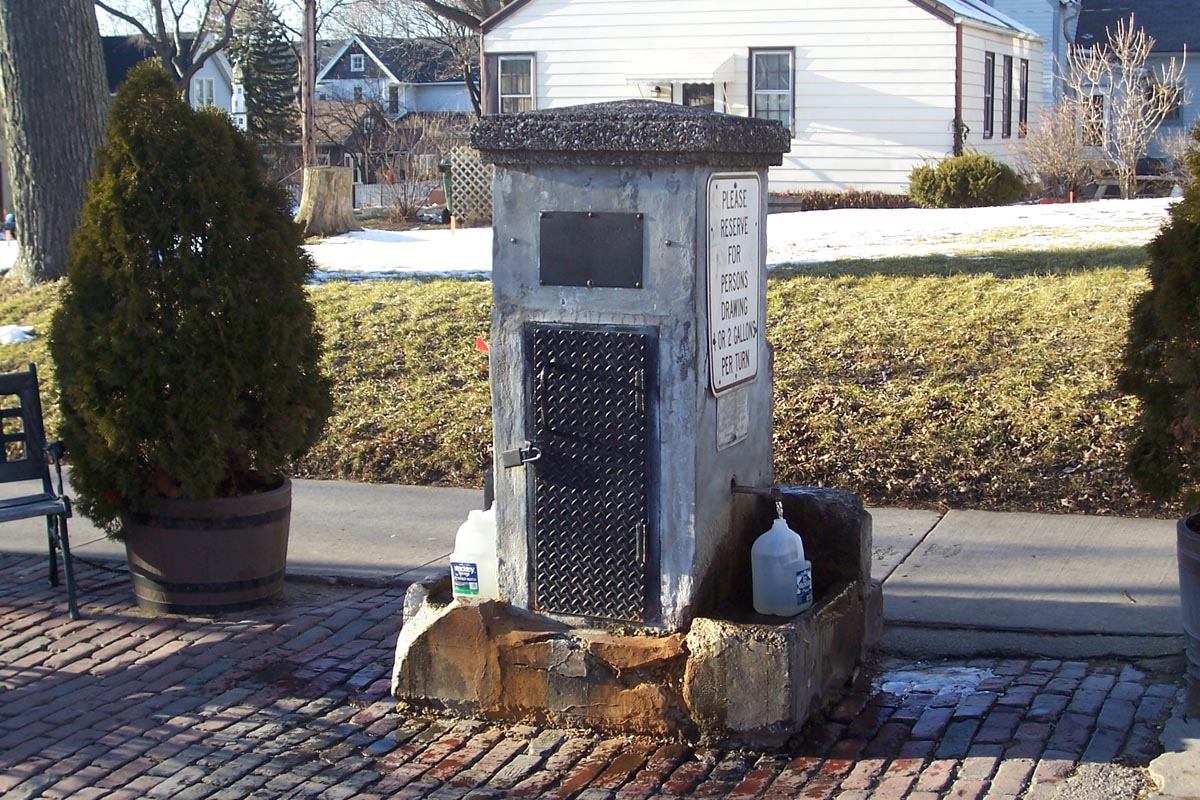

- Location within Wisconsin
- 42.99732°N 87.88815°W
- Location: Milwaukee

History
- Built: 1882

Site notes
- Area: Bay View

The Pryor Avenue Iron Well, or Iron Well, is an early artesian water well located in the Bay View Historic District of Milwaukee, Wisconsin. It was built in 1882 and named for its high iron content. Originally water naturally flowed from the pressurized aquifer below. The original hand pump is now replaced with an electric pump. It was designated a Milwaukee landmark in 1980 for its significance as the last remaining public well in the city.

== Background ==
Drilling began in October 1882 as a public works project by the Village of Bay View, but progressed slowly due to the dense glacial drift below. The final depth of 1500 feet was achieved later in January, at which point water pressure was enough to provide a constant supply of water to a planned network of satellite wells and fire hydrants.

Once completed, the original wellhead consisted of nothing more than an exposed pipe with water spigots for public use. Some time in the 1920s the current concrete monolith was added. It stands roughly five feet tall and has a pipe on either side, from which water continuously flows out of and into ground level drainage basins. Potted plants and benches provided by the Bay View Garden and Yard Society now flank the structure.

Many area residents still visit the Iron Well to fill up on drinking water. It became a popular alternative to the municipal water supply, which draws from Lake Michigan, during the Milwaukee Cryptosporidium outbreak that occurred in April 1993. Despite both water sources being physically close to each other, they remain independent and separated by geological strata.

Water quality tests are performed regularly by the health department and DNR to ensure safety. Tests in 2014 and 2015 found exceedingly high levels of strontium, a naturally occurring element, in the well's water, though city health officials noted it should only be an issue of consideration for "sensitive populations over a lifetime of exposure."
