= Ile Aux Galets =

Island in Michigan, United States

Skilligallee Island
- Location within Michigan Location within the United States

Geography
- Location: Cross Village Township, Emmet County, Michigan
- Coordinates: 45.6763965°N 85.1731233°W
- Adjacent to: Lake Michigan
- Highest elevation: 581 ft (177.1 m)

Administration
- United States

Ile Aux Galets, also known as Skillagallee or Skillagalee Island, is located in northeast Lake Michigan, between Beaver Island and the mainland, approximately 7 miles (11 km) northwest of Cross Village in Emmet County, Michigan. The island's Ile Aux Galets Light warns passing ships of a dangerous gravel shoal extending almost 2 miles (3.2 km) to the east and .5 miles (0.80 km) to the northwest, that poses an imminent hazard to navigation.

== History ==
The islet is home to a significant colony of ring-billed gulls. Its name, given by early French explorers, means "Isle of Pebbles." It is said that the English speakers found the French name unpronounceable, and "Ile aux Galets"—soon misheard, misunderstood and mispronounced—transmuted into "Skillagalee" (or some variant) which took hold. By the "mid 1800s references to the original French name all but disappeared."

There are many wrecks near Skillagalee island. However, on September 27, 1850, the loss of the A.D. Patchin, a wood sidewheeler 226 feet (69 m) long and built in Trenton, Michigan in 1846, led to the construction of the first light on the island. Loaded with general goods, the Patchin's course into Grays Reef Passage was disrupted by currents that pulled her onto Skillagalee's shore. Her crew escaped and was rescued, but foul winds and weather thwarted many attempts to set her free. She was "pounded to pieces, becoming yet another of Lake Michigan's many victims."
