= Michigan Underwater Preserve Council =

U.S. nonprofit organization

The Michigan Underwater Preserve Council (MUPC) is a private, non-profit, volunteer driven organization that oversees activities relating to the Michigan Underwater Preserves. The council was formed in order to educate divers and non-divers on the history and importance of the shipwrecks of the great lakes so that the public might assist in the preservation of Michigan's bottomland heritage.
