= Eber Brock Ward =

American manufacturer and shipbuilder

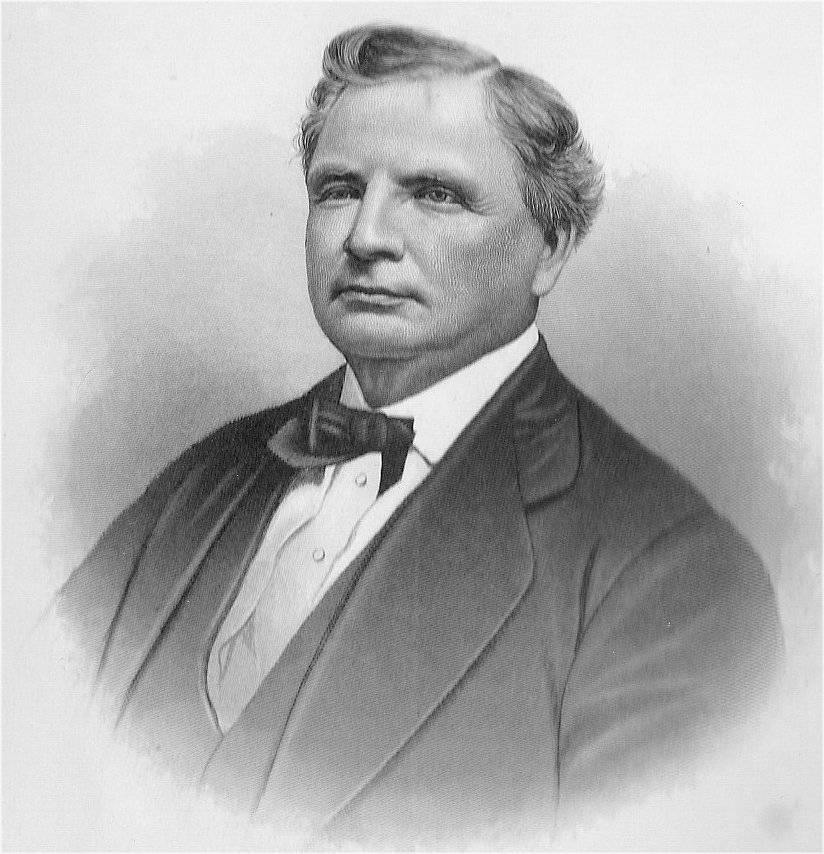
- ca. 1875
- Born: December 25, 1811; Applegaths Mills, Upper Canada
- Died: January 2, 1875 (aged 63); Detroit, Michigan, US
- Resting place: Elmwood Cemetery, Detroit
- Occupation: businessman
- Known for: industrialist
- Title: Captain of Industry of the Midwest
- Political party: Republican
- Spouse(s): Mary McQueen (first wife); Catharine Lyon (second wife)
- Relatives: Beulah Brinton, cousin

Eber Brock Ward (December 25, 1811 – January 2, 1875) was an American industrialist, iron and steel manufacturer, and shipbuilder.

Ward invested in several industries in Michigan and the Midwest. He started as an owner of steamship interests, and later accumulated woodlands, as well as lands that contained iron ore, copper and silver. His investments would ultimately include newspapers, railroads, glass manufacturing, banking, and insurance companies.

== Early life ==
Ward was born in Applegaths Mills, Upper Canada on December 25, 1811.

While in Waterford, Pennsylvania, Ward's mother fell ill and died and the family moved to Detroit.

== Business ==
=== Shipping ===
Ward obtained a job as a cabin boy and deck hand when he was twelve or thirteen years old at Marine City, Michigan and worked for a time for Samuel Ward, his uncle. Ward came in contact with marine transactions this way, and learned the industry.

Ward invested in a vessel called the General Harrison, as a 25 percent owner, and became the master of this vessel in 1835. He was successful as its operator, but eventually became a partner with his uncle at Marine City. He was successful at this enterprise, and continued this until 1850, when he moved to Detroit. There he was involved in the shipbuilding business, and his operations participated in the construction of steamers and sailing ships; among them were the Arctic, Atlantic, B.F. Wade, Detroit, General Harrison, Huron, Montgomery, Ocean, Pacific, Planet, Samuel Ward, Caspian, Champion, and Pearl.

=== Railroading ===
Starting around 1852, Ward acquired timberlands along the Pere Marquette River in Lake County, near the Ludington area. He held onto this land, waiting for the timber to mature. He was elected president of the Flint and Pere Marquette Railroad Company in 1860, and was the first to use rail made of Bessemer steel.

=== Steel manufacturing ===
Bessemer steel was produced at Kelly Pneumatic Process Company around 1864 or 1865.

=== Logging ===
Ward carried on logging operations in Lake County through his agents. In 1869 he purchased a tract consisting of 70,000 acres (28,000 ha) in the fourth ward of Ludington, on Lake Pere Marquette, accessible by the Pere Marquette River.

Ward built a sawmill out on Lake Pere Marquette in 1870, known as the "North" mill. It was built on 55 stone piers, and was 50 ft (15 m) by 130 ft (40 m) in size. It was equipped with two circular mills, and "cutting-edge technology". The cost of the mill was $60,000 (equivalent to $1,528,000 in 2025), and it had a capacity of 100,000 board feet (240 m^{3}) per day. Ward purchased all the land between his mill and that of Messrs. Danaher and Melendy, which bordered on the Lake in the spring of 1871. During the summer months, he built a 50 ft (15 m) by 120 ft (37 m) warehouse near the original mill. This was used for storing supplies, and selling supplies to his employees. The next year Ward, built another mill nearby, which was called the "South" mill. This was then considered the best sawmill in the United States.

=== Mining ===
Ward engaged in silver mining around Lake Superior with the Silver Islet Mining Company.

== Personal life ==
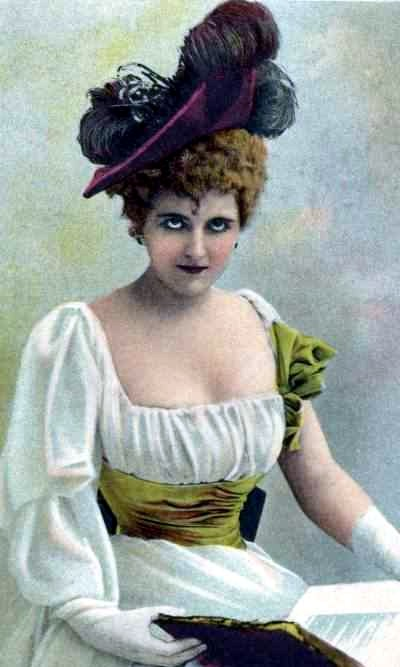
Clara Ward, daughter

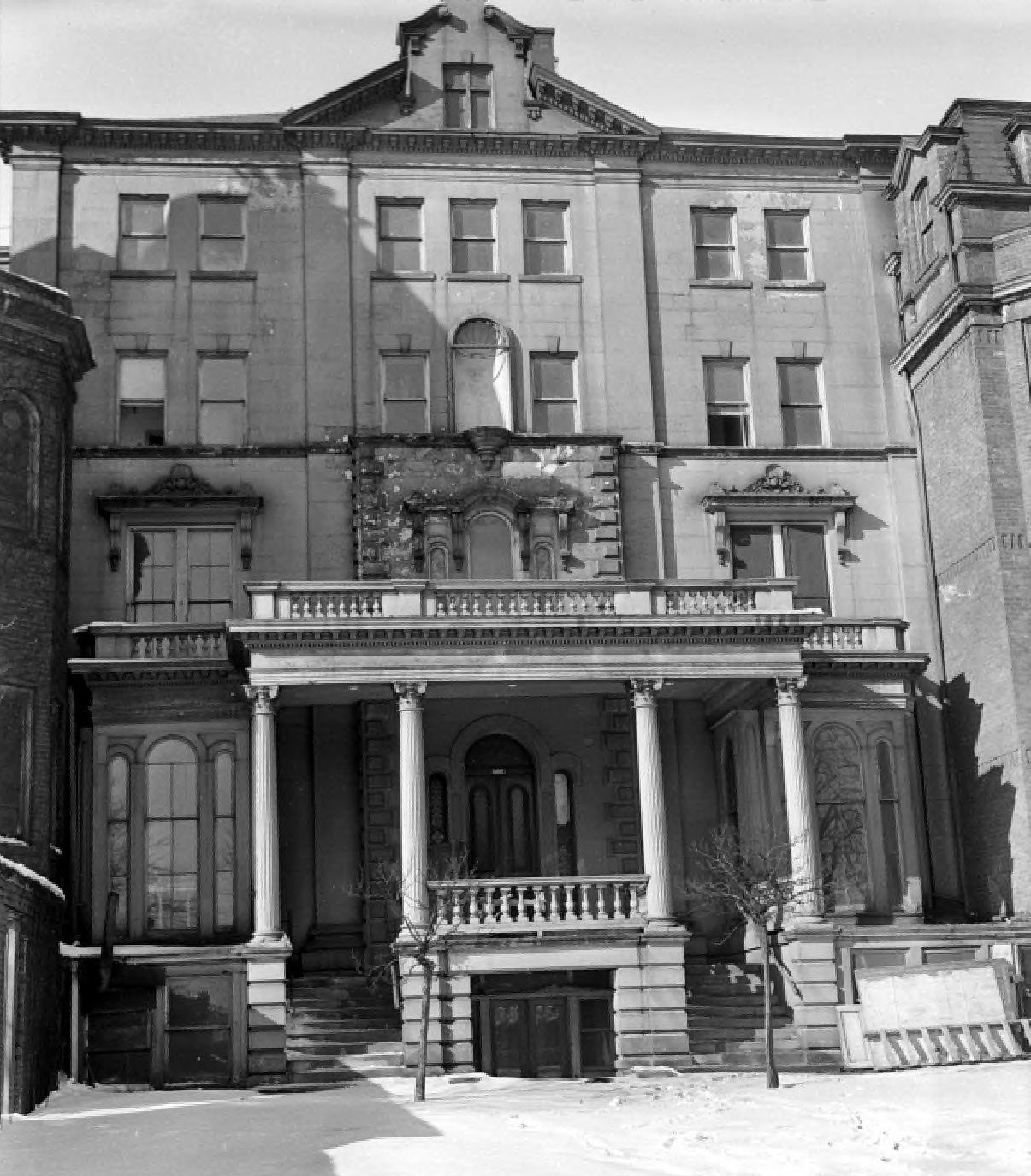
Ward's Detroit home on W. Fort St

Ward was married twice. His first marriage, on July 24, 1837, was to Mary Margaret McQueen of Newport, Michigan, who had seven children that grew to adulthood. His second marriage, in 1869, was to Catherine Lyon of Conneaut, Ohio.

Ward died of a stroke on January 2, 1875. He owned about a million dollars' worth of stock in the North Chicago Rolling Mill company, and about half a million dollars' worth of stock of the Milwaukee Rolling Mill company. He also had about a half a million in the Wyandotte Rolling Mill. He left seven children. He last lived at West Fort Street and 19th Ave in Detroit. Ward is buried in Elmwood Cemetery.

== Bibliography ==
- Andreas, Alfred Theodore (1885). History of Chicago. A. T. Andreas.
- Bensman, David; Wilson, Mark R. (2005). "Iron and Steel". Encyclopedia of Chicago. Chicago, Illinois: University of Chicago Press, Chicago Historical Society. p. 653.
- Carlisle, Frederick (1890). Chronography of notable events in the history of the Northwest territory and Wayne County. O.S. Gulley, Borman & Co., Printers.
- Michigan Pioneer and Historical Society (1894). Historical Collections. Vol. 21. The Society.
- History of Mason, Oceania, and Manistee Counties, Michigan. H. R. Page. 1882.
- Sauveur, Albert, ed. (1906). The Bessemer Process in the United States (PDF). United States: Boston Testing Laboratories. p. 134.
- Woodford, Arthur M. (2001). This is Detroit, 1701–2001. Detroit, Michigan: Wayne State University Press. ISBN 0-8143-2914-4.
