= Bay View, Milwaukee =

Coordinates: 42°59′30″N 87°53′45″W

- Bay View Historic District
- U.S. National Register of Historic Places
- U.S. Historic district
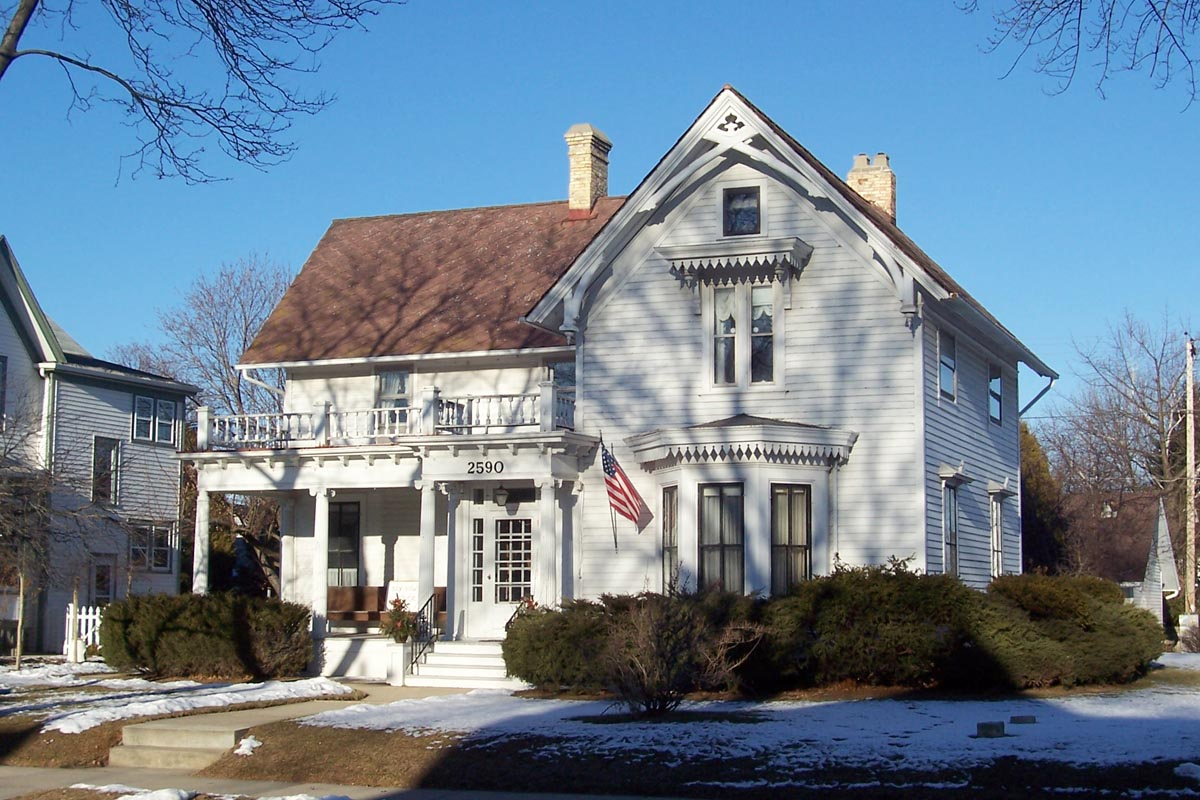
- Home of Beulah Brinton, an early community figure
- Location: Milwaukee, Wisconsin
- Built: 1867
- Architect: multiple
- Architectural style: Bungalow/Craftsman, Late Victorian
- NRHP reference No.: 82000686
- Added to NRHP: 23 August 1982 (44 years ago)

Bay View is a neighborhood in Milwaukee, Wisconsin, on the shores of Lake Michigan, south of the downtown area and north of the City of St. Francis. Bay View existed as an independent village for eight years, from 1879 to 1887.

== History ==
=== Settlement ===
The first permanent European settlement of the Bay View area was in 1834. Horace Chase, future Milwaukee mayor, is credited as the first permanent settler. By the following year, he had been joined by Dr. Enoch Chase, Joel Wilcox, Alexander Stewart, and Elijah Estes. The Chases staked claims around the mouth of the Milwaukee River expecting growth there, but in the 1850s the harbor outlet was moved to the north, and the city of Milwaukee developed around it.

In 1855, the Green Bay, Milwaukee and Chicago Rail Road established its first Milwaukee-area depot in Bay View. The community was named for its scenic views upon the lake.

=== A company town ===
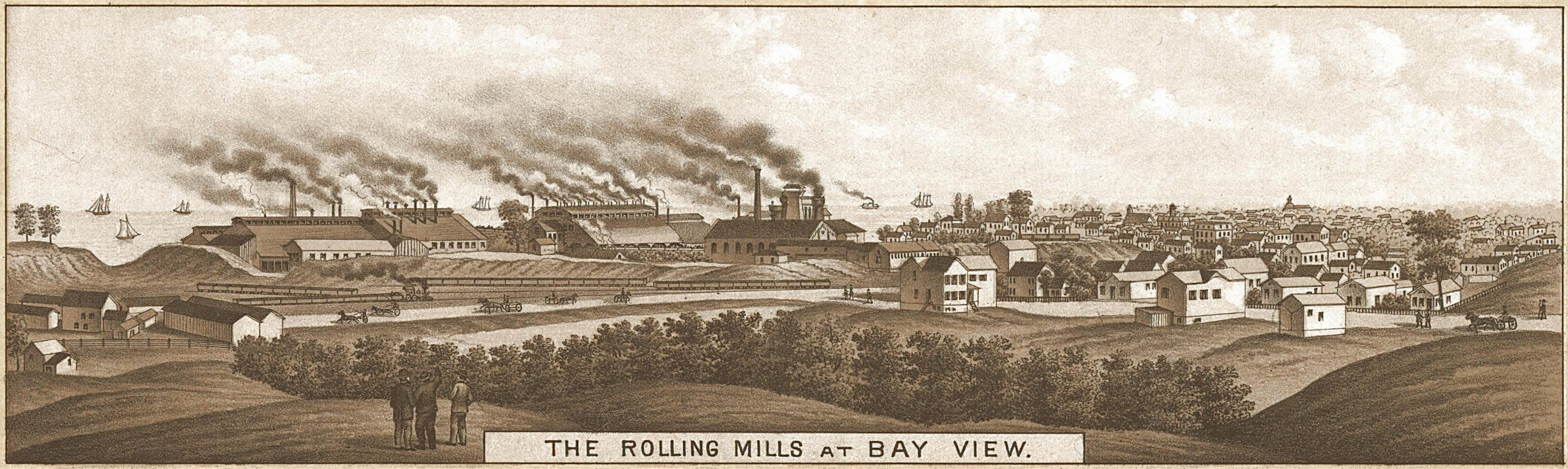
The rolling mills at Bay View (1882).

In 1868, the Milwaukee Iron Company, led by Eber Brock Ward, opened a steel rolling mill south of the original outlet of the Milwaukee River. The primary aim was to produce rails for railroads. The factory itself occupied 27.5 acres and the surrounding 76.5 acres were for employees. On some the Iron Company built tenements for workers; others were sold to workers on easy terms. Bay View was established as a company town. A Methodist Episcopal church and a Welsh Congregational church were already established in 1868. Saloons were prevented by a provision in the deeds of sale. By 1879, Bay View had a population of 2,592, and incorporated as a village, on approx 1.4 sq mi (3.6 km^{2}; 360 ha) of land.

Labor Unions began in Bay View in 1868 when puddlers at the mill formed a Sons of Vulcan local. By 1886, Bay View had become a center of workers' rights activism, the culmination of which was the Bay View Massacre. Through ups and downs the mill evolved to produce a wide assortment of steel products, acquiring the name Illinois Steel Company before it shut down in 1929.

=== Milwaukee neighborhood ===
In 1887, the village's approximately 4,000 residents voted overwhelmingly to be annexed to the city of Milwaukee, becoming the city's 17th ward and ending the community's independent status. Bay View was annexed because of the "Fernwood Model", where the neighborhood received many incentives from the city of Milwaukee such as sewers, sidewalks, street lights, and other public necessities. The residents of Bay View viewed the annexation of Milwaukee as a way to improve their lives and community. Thenceforth, the village has been a Milwaukee neighborhood.

Although the neighborhood boundaries of Bay View have grown over the years as more and more people identify with it, the specific boundaries given by the Milwaukee Neighborhood Identification Project are: along the border of Lake Michigan; south of Jones Island; from Lincoln Avenue to the north; and Howell Avenue to the west, south to Morgan Avenue. Many residents consider both Fernwood and portions of Tippecanoe neighborhoods to be parts of Bay View. Some sources list the southern boundary as Howard Avenue. The Bay View Historical Society includes the areas as far west as 6th Street, and north to Becher Street, although they admit that this is debated:

One thing most Bay Viewites will agree upon is that Bay View is not necessarily defined by precise boundaries; it is more a state of mind influenced by both Lake Michigan ("the lake") and a long history of a strong sense of community.

=== NRHP historical district ===
In 1982, a portion of the east side of the original village was listed by the National Register of Historic Places as the Bay View Historic District, with about 330 buildings mostly built between 1870 and 1915 which give the feel of the company town that Bay View once was. According to the designation, it is bounded by Lake Michigan to the east, and roughly from Meredith Street to Superior, up to Nock Street and then from Wentworth Avenue to Pryor Avenue. Some significant properties are:

- The iron worker's cottage at 2524 S. Superior Street is one of eight adjacent iron workers' cottages (2500, 2506, 2508, 2512, 2518, 2522 and 2530) built around 1870. All are modest one-story buildings, gable-roofed, built by the Milwaukee Iron Company. Of the eight, 2524 is probably least changed.
- The Brinton house at 2590 S. Superior Street is a 2-story gabled-ell-form house with columns and bargeboards built about 1870 by the mill's foundry supervisor Warren Brinton and his wife Beulah, who was a cousin of the mill's founder. Beulah ran an early lending library out of this home and gave homemaking lessons to the wives and children of immigrant millworkers.
- The Starkey house at 2582 S. Shore Drive is a 2-story frame Italianate home built in 1878 by the Milwaukee Iron Company and initially occupied by Joseph A. Starkey, who managed the Bay View Roller Mills. From 1879 to 1905 the George Starkey family lived in the house; George was a carpenter/builder. The 1897 addition was designed by Ferry & Clas.
- The Estes house at 2795 S. Shore Drive is a 2-story Italianate frame home built about 1878 by descendants of Elijah and Zebiah Estes, the pioneers from whose farm much of the original town was subdivided.
- The Bullock house at 2577 S. Superior Street is a 2-story Queen Anne-styled house built in 1889 for Jacob Bullock, a puddler in the steel mill who later became a tax assessor and real estate agent.
- The duplexes at 2700, 2702-A and 2706-A S. Shore Drive were built in 1892, possibly by August Wendt, all for the same owner. All are 2-story, with decorative patterns in the brick and limestone trim.
- The Garibaldi Club at 2501-7 S. Superior Street is a 2-story brick tavern that was built in 1907 by the Joseph Schlitz Brewing Company. During Prohibition the building housed a restaurant and since 1943 it has housed the Garibaldi Club, a social club and aid society for Italian immigrants.
- The South Shore Park Bathhouse is a Mediterranean Revival-styled bath house designed by Ferry & Clas and built in 1933.

== Recreation ==
Within Bay View's borders is South Shore Park, part of the Milwaukee County Park System. South Shore Park features the Oak Leaf Trail, a volleyball court, and a pavilion overlooking the swimming beach and the marina at the South Shore Yacht Club.

Humboldt Park, one of the first parks in the city, opened in 1891 and presently features fishing, softball, tennis, horseshoes, a band shell, and ice skating and hockey on the lagoons during Winter. Humboldt park also hosts a music series in the summer called Chill on the Hill on Tuesday nights and houses a seasonal "beer garden" with food and alcohol in a picnic-style setting.

The Beulah Brinton Community Center offers a variety of youth, adult, and senior activities including volleyball, aerobics, yoga, taekwondo, toddler play groups, and senior lunch programs.

Bay View has a history of local art which has blossomed with what some have called a "renaissance" of the community. Many bars and venues host a rotating display of locally produced art, and several galleries have cropped up along the Kinnickinnic Avenue which runs through the area. Bay View has long been a destination for popular musical acts both local and from around the country. The neighborhood is also an attraction for quarterly gallery events of standing and one-time shows.

== Education ==
Milwaukee Public Schools operates area public schools. Grade schools included:

- Milwaukee Parkside School of the Arts (K-8)
  - Parkside School for the Arts was formed by a 2013 merger of Dover Street Elementary in Bay View and Tippecanoe School for the Arts & Humanities, a K-8 school in Town of Lake

Bay View High School is the area zoned high school. In 2010, only 86 students at Bay View High lived in the school's attendance zone, making up 7.5% of the school's students. Many area parents avoided the school due to substandard graduation rates and test scores. By 2011 there was a movement from area parents to revive the school's reputation by creating a university preparatory track.

Dover Street School, west of Humboldt Park, in recent years became the Bay View Montessori School - Upper Campus. In 2013 MPS had suggested converting the vacant school building into residences for teachers.

=== History of schools ===
In 1883, the first school in Bay View opened. Around 1889 that school closed and New Seventeenth District School opened in its place; it received three additional classrooms in 1893. The school was later renamed Dover Street School. The classes of Dover Street and Tippecanoe School for the Arts & Humanities, which opened in 1929, moved into the former Fritsche Middle School. The MPS board approved the proposed consolidation of the two schools in 2012, and the two schools were consolidated in 2013.

The community was previously served by Fritsche Middle School, which in 2010 was consolidated into Bay View High School.

== Notable people ==
- William Alldridge, Socialist machinist and politician who became a lawyer
- Beulah Brinton was a housewife who opened her home to the families of Bay View's iron mill workers in the early 1870s.
- Irv Comp, football player
- Spencer Tracy, theatrical and film actor, attended Trowbridge Street School in Bay View.
- James Groppi, civil rights activist and former Catholic priest, was born and raised in Bay View.
- Robert R. Heider, state legislator
- Daniel Hooker, state legislator and foundry worker
- Esther Jones, US Olympian
- Tony Kubek, MLB Player with the New York Yankees
- James Lemont, state legislator
- Ambrose McGuigan, state legislator
- Lance Sijan, United States Air Force officer and Medal of Honor recipient
- Pete Wagner, political cartoonist, activist, and author

== See also ==
- Neighborhoods of Milwaukee
- Bay View Historical Society
- Bay View incident
- Bay View massacre
- South Shore Water Frolics
- Pryor Avenue Iron Well
- Beulah Brinton House
