= Pack (surname) =

Pack is a surname. Notable people with the surname include:

- Carl Pack (1899–1945), New York politician
- Charles Lathrop Pack (1857–1937), businessman, philanthropist, philatelist
- David Pack (born 1952), American singer and musician
- Sir Denis Pack (1772–1823), Anglo-Irish military officer
- Frederick J. Pack (1875–1938), American geologist and writer
- George Pack Jr. (1800–1875), Canadian-American businessman, timberman
- George T. Pack (1898–1969), American oncologist
- George Willis Pack (1831–1906), Michigan timberman, millionaire
- Howard Pack (1918–2008), American shipping executive
- John Pack (1809–1885), member of the Church of the Latter Day Saints' Council of Fifty
- Michael Pack (born 1954), American documentary filmmaker
- Pamela Pack (b. 1979), American professional rock climber
- Randolph Greene Pack (1890–1956), American forester and philanthropist
- Robert Pack (b. 1929), American poet, critic, and educator
- Robert J. Pack (b. 1969), American basketball player and coach
- Sandra L. Pack, American accountant, financial officer, and government official
- W. Joe Pack (1875–1939), Justice of the Supreme Court of Mississippi

== See also ==
- Pak (surname), a variation of the Korean surname, Park
