= George Pack =

George Pack may refer to:

- George Pack (actor), (died 1724), British stage actor
- George Pack Jr. (1794–1875), American businessman, landowner, sawmill operator, and postmaster on the Lower Peninsula of Michigan
- George Willis Pack (1831–1906), American timberman on Michigan's Lower Peninsula
- George T. Pack (1898–1969), American oncologist
