= Andrea Clark =

African-American photographer

Andrea Clark (March 19, 1945 – October 29, 2025) was an African-American photographer living in Asheville, North Carolina. She is best known for her black and white photographs that document Asheville's East End community taken circa 1968-1972.

== Early life and family ==
Andrea Elizabeth Clarke was born to James Howard Clarke and Mildred Rae Johnson Clarke in Cambridge, Massachusetts. Her education included Cambridge Rindge and Latin School and nursing school before she moved to Asheville in 1965.

Her paternal family had roots in Asheville. Her father was the son of master mason James Vester Miller, who had been born into slavery in 1858 in Rutherford County, N.C, and moved with his family to Asheville soon after the Civil War. In his youth, Miller developed an interest in construction and architecture through observation and working on job sites, eventually honing his craft as an apprentice under the city’s premier brick masons. His superior skills garnered the attention of prominent local architects, most notably Richard Sharp Smith, who oversaw the Biltmore Estate construction. Miller eventually established his own firm, Miller & Sons, successfully securing contracts within a construction industry that was largely controlled by White competitors. Miller’s work includes some of Asheville’s most iconic structures, including St. Matthias Episcopal Church (Asheville, North Carolina), Mt. Zion Missionary Baptist Church, the Young Men's Institute Building (currently known as the YMI Cultural Center), and the Asheville Municipal Building, among others. Later in the 1930s Miller founded Violet Hill Cemetery in West Asheville, named in honor of his wife. He was laid to rest there upon his death in 1940, leaving behind a legacy that continues to shape Asheville’s cultural and physical landscape.

One of Andrea's passions was working on documenting her family heritage and creating the James Vester Miller Walking Trail.

== Career ==
Andrea Clark is best known for her career as a photographer, particularly a series of hundreds of black and white photographs that provide some of the only documentation of Black neighborhoods that were destroyed as part of Asheville's urban renewal efforts. The East End had been a vibrant Black community since the 1880s, but by 1978, the City of Asheville had razed much of it, and families were relocated to other neighborhoods.

These photos were a central part of the project "Twilight of a Neighborhood: Asheville's East End, 1970," funded by the North Carolina Humanities Council in 2008. As part of the project, Clark and others also recorded oral history interviews with residents impacted by the destruction of the East End.

"Andrea Clark's photographs capture the full spectrum of community life in Asheville's East End in 1970. The images portray a neighborhood with bustling business and street life, gardens where people grew their own food, and sidewalks on which children played under the watchful eyes of elders."

Clark's East End photos have been displayed at the YMI Cultural Center, the Asheville Museum of History, and Pack Memorial Library. The Andrea Clark Collection is part of Buncombe County Special Collections at Pack Memorial Library.

== Legacy and death ==
In 2020 Clark was awarded the Sondley Award by the Historic Resources Commission of Asheville and Buncombe County. While Clark was honored to have been given the award, she was quick to point out that it was named for Foster Alexander Sondley and as such rooted in institutional racism. When Sondley bequeathed his extensive personal library to the City of Asheville upon his death in 1931, it was under the strict caveat in his will that the books were to be viewed by “well-conducted white people” only. Later in 1943, Sondley's collection became the reference section of the Pack Memorial Library, and during conversations around desegregation of the library system, administrators frequently cited Sondley's will as a justification for denying access to the historical archives and refusing service to black residents in Buncombe County.

As a result of Clark initiating and facilitating important conversations around inclusivity and honoring collective community history, the following year the Historic Resources Commission elected to change the name of the award to the Historic Resources Champion Award, and honored Andrea Clark again with the new distinction in 2021.

On October 29, 2025, Ms. Clark passed away at the age of 80.
