= Arizona-Sonora Desert Museum =

Museum, zoo, garden, and art gallery in Tucson, Arizona, US

- Museum logo
- Interactive map of Arizona-Sonora Desert Museum
- 32°14′38″N 111°10′5″W
- Date opened: September 1, 1952
- Location: Tucson, Arizona
- Land area: 98 acres (40 ha) (21 acres (8.5 ha) accessible to the public)
- No. of animals: 12,370
- No. of species: Over 230
- Annual visitors: 400,000
- Memberships: AZA, AAM, APGA
- Website: www.desertmuseum.org

The Arizona-Sonora Desert Museum is a 98-acre (40 ha) zoo, aquarium, botanical garden, natural history museum, publisher, and art gallery founded in 1952. Located just west of Tucson, Arizona, it features two miles (3.2 km) of walking paths traversing 21 acres (8.5 ha) of desert landscape. It is one of the most visited attractions in Southern Arizona.

The nonprofit organization focuses on the interpretation of the natural history, plants and animals of the Sonoran Desert. The museum is home to more than 230 animal species and 1,200 varieties of plants. It is open every day through the year, and hosts nearly 400,000 visitors annually, including visitors from abroad.

The museum is an accredited member of the Association of Zoos and Aquariums, a member of the American Alliance of Museums and the American Public Gardens Association.

== History ==
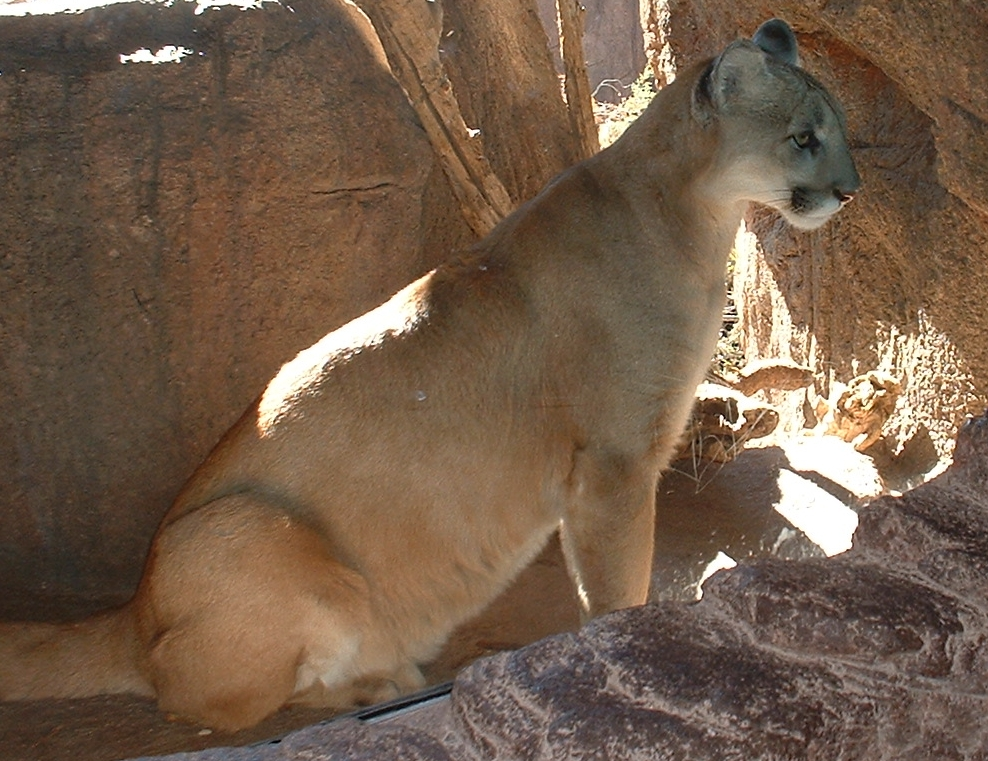
A cougar at the Arizona-Sonora Desert Museum. This image shows the natural surroundings created for the animal enclosures.

Founded in 1952, the Arizona-Sonora Desert Museum interprets the complete natural history of a single region—the Sonoran Desert and adjacent ecosystems—with plants and animals from the region featured together in its exhibits.

William H. Carr inspired and founded the Desert Museum with the support of his friend, Arthur Newton Pack, a conservationist, son of Charles Lathrop Pack, and editor of Nature Magazine. Carr had earlier founded the Bear Mountain Trailside Museum in New York, which was affiliated with the American Museum of Natural History. There he had developed a similar approach to displays, working with native plants and animals to create a regionally focused collection.

Pack, through his foundation, had provided $200,000 to open the museum and pay its operating cost, so the museum initially charged no admission. Although an admission charge was instituted in 1953, the museum is still supported only by admission fees, memberships, and donations, and receives no direct support from public taxes.

From 1953 to 1985, a local television series, Desert Trails, featured the museum. "It was an informal show, almost always having live animals and human guests, and focusing on the natural history of the desert as well as happenings at the museum." In 1991 the museum partnered to develop a national television series known as Desert Speaks. It was produced in cooperation with the local PBS affiliate (KUAT), and with The Nature Conservancy of Arizona. This television series was broadcast in 200 markets and ran for 19 seasons."

TripAdvisor rated the Museum as Tucson's #2 attraction for 2018. It was ranked number 18 on their "Top 25 Museums – United States" and a top five public gardens to visit in the United States for 2018, and ranked number nine in the world on their "Traveler’s Choice" of top museums for 2013 and 2014. Condé Nast Traveler's "The Daily Traveler" included in their list of five museums in the United States for children interested in dinosaurs.

== Exhibits and interpretation ==
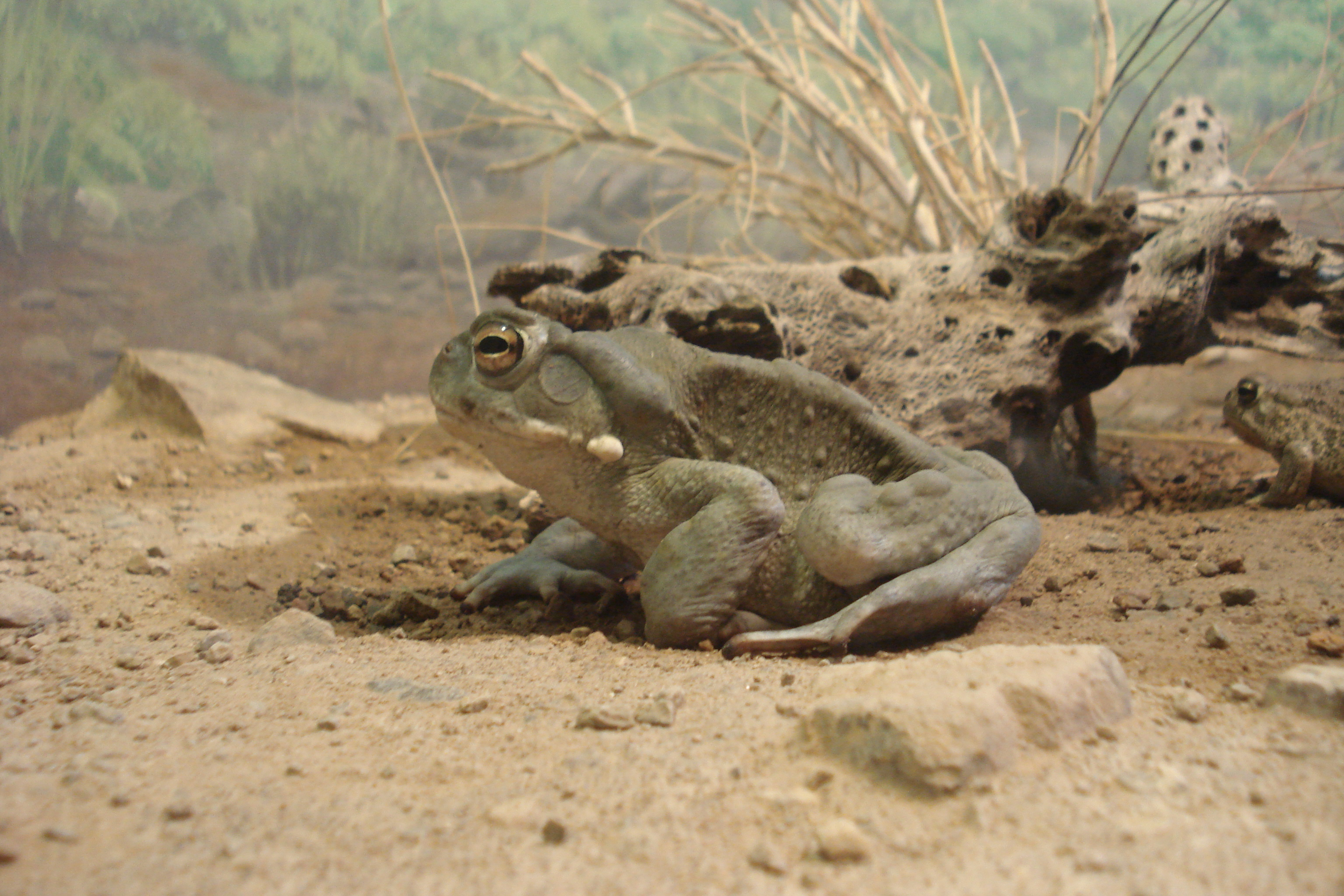
Sonoran Desert Toad, or Colorado River Toad, at the museum

The Warden Aquarium opened in January 2013. The 1,100-square-foot (100 m^{2}) aquarium highlights the roles of the Colorado and other rivers in the region, as well as the Gulf of California, from which the water brought by the monsoon is essential to life in the Sonoran Desert.

The Desert Museum has exhibited lower vertebrates and invertebrates since its early days. Though this hall has been modified over the years, the building dates back to 1937 and many of the painted dioramas were created in the early to mid-1950s. On exhibit is a wide variety of native reptiles, including many species of rattlesnakes. Many amphibians and other invertebrates, ranging from spiders and scorpions to beetles, walking sticks, and grasshoppers, are also showcased.

At Cat Canyon visitors can view small cats, like bobcats and an ocelot, in naturalistic grotto settings. This exhibit area also includes a gray fox and porcupine.

The Desert Grassland exhibit area recreates a desert grassland habitat featuring soap tree yuccas, desert scrub, grasses and succulents. Visitors can observe prairie dogs and learn the region's history through a replica of a mammoth kill site.

Life on the Rocks is a multi-species exhibit focusing on the habitat and species most often encountered amid the region's rocky slopes. Some enclosures are mesh-topped with natural soils and vegetation; others are glass-fronted crevices or cutaway burrows in simulated soil banks. The "homes" of individual species are embedded in the rocks—many with burrows that can be exposed by visitors.

The Life Underground exhibit highlights creatures that make their homes underground. Visitors enter a tunnel and walk below ground into a dimly lit corridor where various creatures, such as kit fox, kangaroo rat, and ringtail, are featured. Here visitors learn where animals go when the desert heats up.

Currently on exhibit in the Riparian Corridor area are a river otter, bighorn sheep, coatis (also known as coatimundis), beavers, native fish and aquatic invertebrates (i.e., dragonflies and snails). There is also a desert toad life-cycle installation.

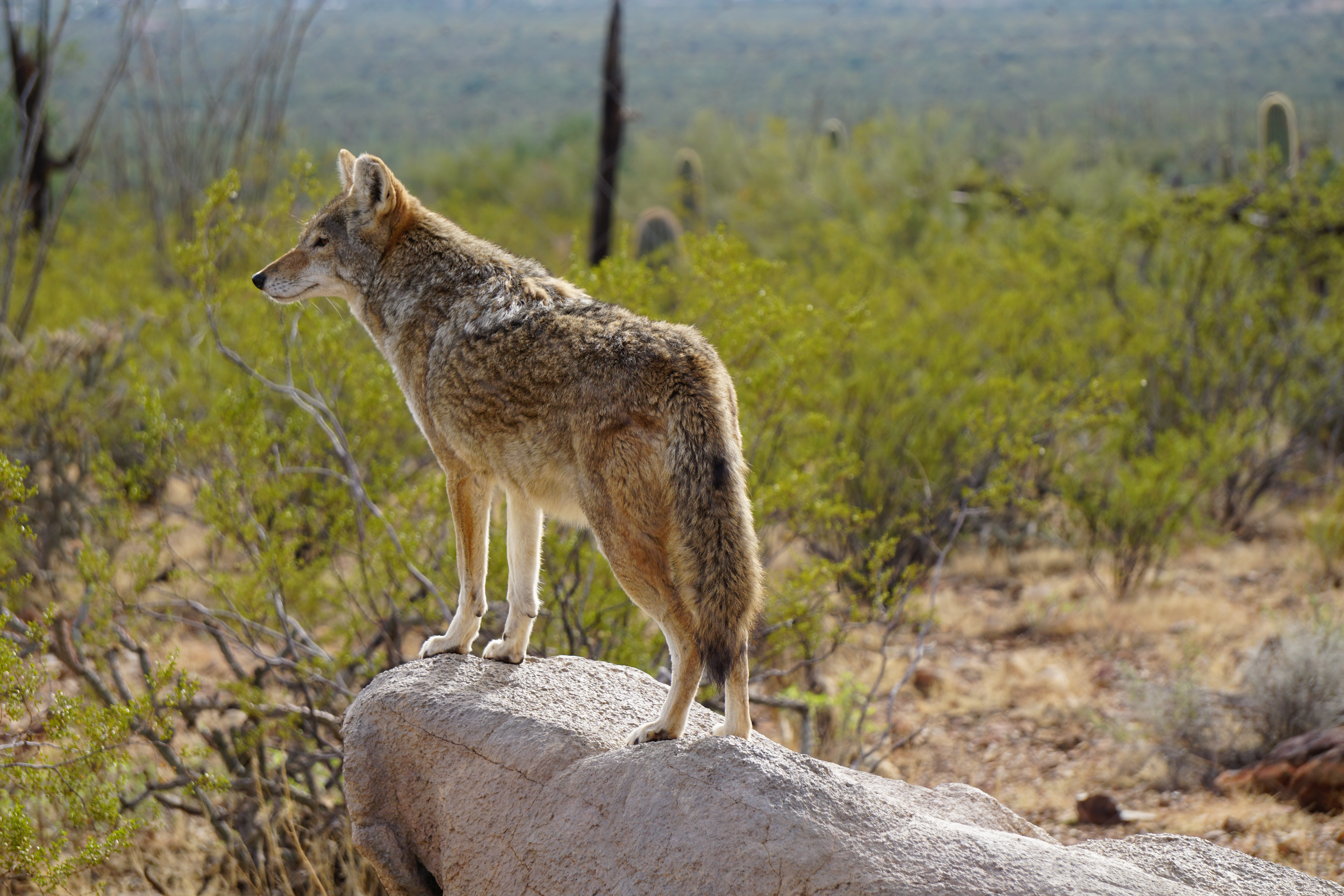
A coyote (Canis latrans) standing on a rock.

The Desert Loop Trail is an unpaved desert trail one-half mile long, passing through areas where javelinas, coyotes and lizards are on display. The fiber fencing there are designed to be almost invisible to the eye, aiming to make the enclosure feel like naturally open space. Agaves and various legume trees, native to the region, are identified on this trail.

The "Mountain Woodland" exhibit is a Mexican pine–oak woodland habitat recreating similar habitats in nearby mountain ranges. Native species include a cougar, white-tailed deer, Merriam's turkeys and a brown bear. Mexican wolves and thick-billed parrots also showcased in this area are no longer present in the Sonoran Desert.

There is a walk-in aviary with northern cardinals, Gambel's quail, ducks, doves, and many other species of native birds. Several benches are located throughout the aviary for observation. A small stream runs through the middle of the enclosure.

The Earth Sciences Center-Cave is an artificial cave constructed with arches, side chambers and a tunnel for visitors to explore its 75-foot length. Along the entry passage, organisms and residents are displayed. Further in, a glistening mass of cave formations are lit from beneath the surface of a pool. In the grand rooms, fossils, geologic gems and minerals, and the history of the earth is interpreted.

Desert Garden was built as a partnership between Sunset magazine and the Desert Museum. Three different levels of demonstration gardens display various species of plants that can be used in landscaping for homes in the Sonoran Desert region. There are two water features and seating. Attracted by water and flowers, wild native birds and butterflies frequently visit.

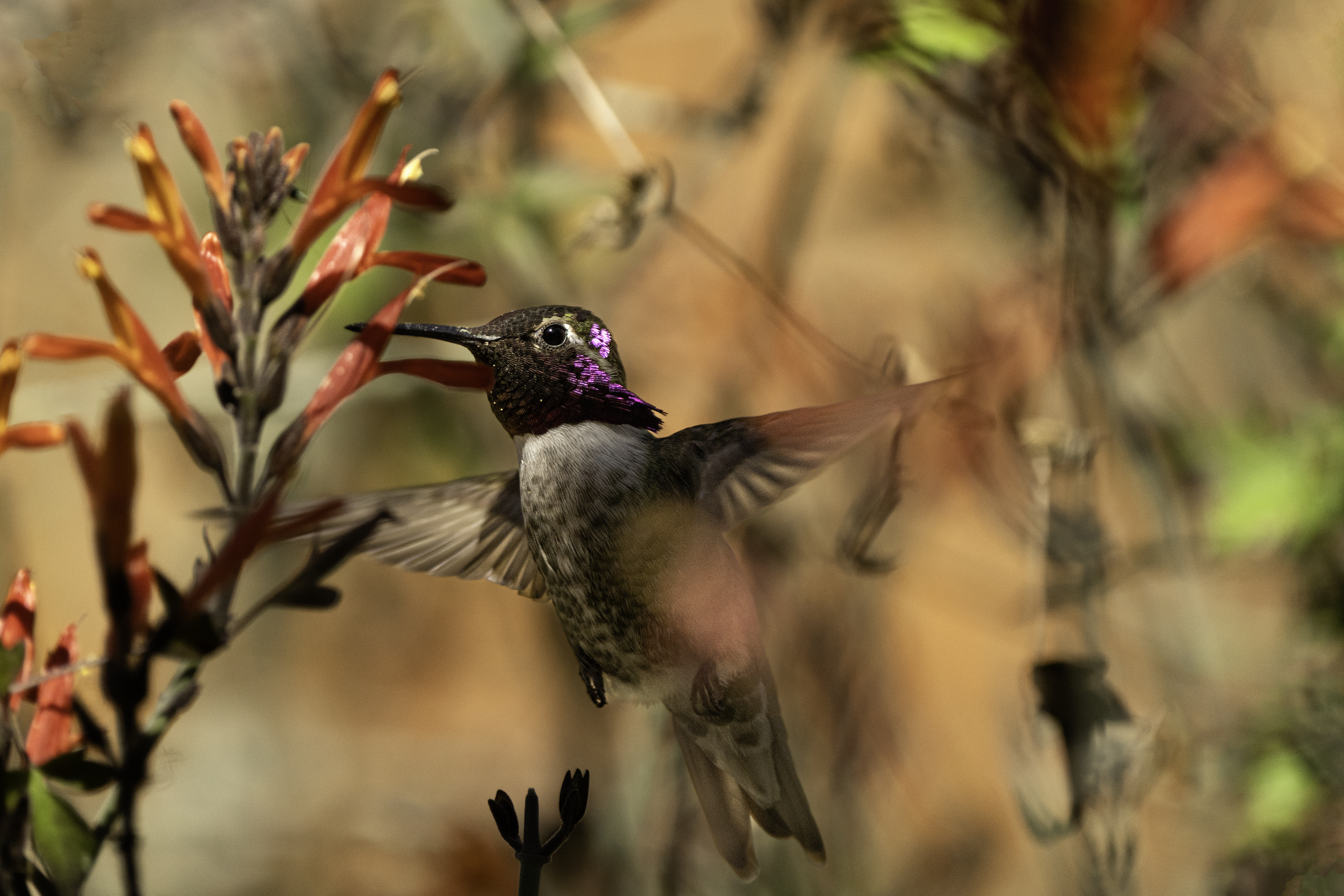
A Costa's Hummingbird feeding on a flower in the Hummingbird Aviary

The Hummingbird Aviary allows observation of hummingbirds hovering so closely that visitors can feel the air disturbed by their wings. In breeding season, nests are near enough to allow viewing of the babies. The aviary houses four species that nest annually. The museum's Hummingbird Propagation Program is the only one of its kind in the world for North American hummingbirds.

Due to its bi-seasonal rainfall, the Sonoran Desert region is known as the "lushest desert on earth" and is home to over 2,000 species of plants. The museum's gardens display this ecosystem and represent a variety of biotic communities found within the Sonoran Desert region. There are 1,200 different species of plants with 56,000 individual specimens planted on the grounds. The following gardens are available for viewing throughout the year:

- Desert Grasslands
- Agave Garden
- Palo Verde Trees
- Hohokam Agave Field
- Cactus Garden
- Labyrinth
- People and Pollinators
- Life Zone Transects
- Tropical Deciduous Forest
- Desert Garden
- Yucca Ramada
- Pollination Gardens

=== Live presentations ===
==== Raptor free-flight ====
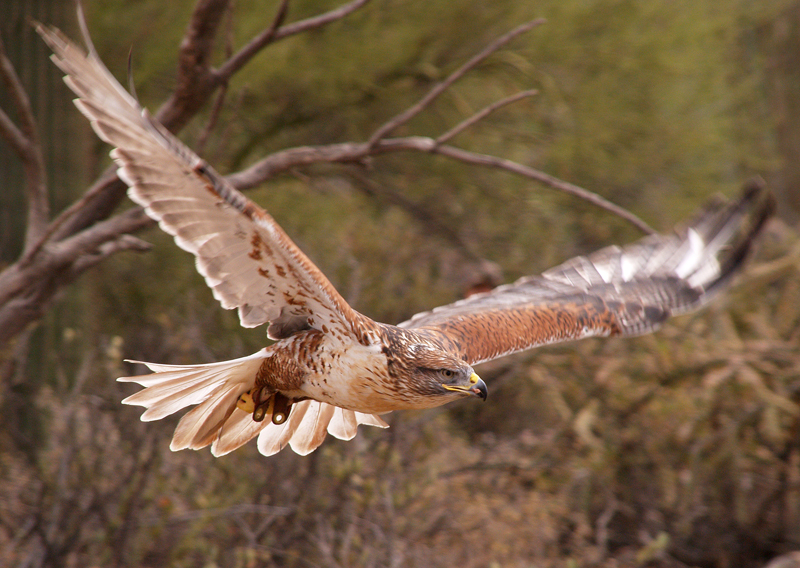

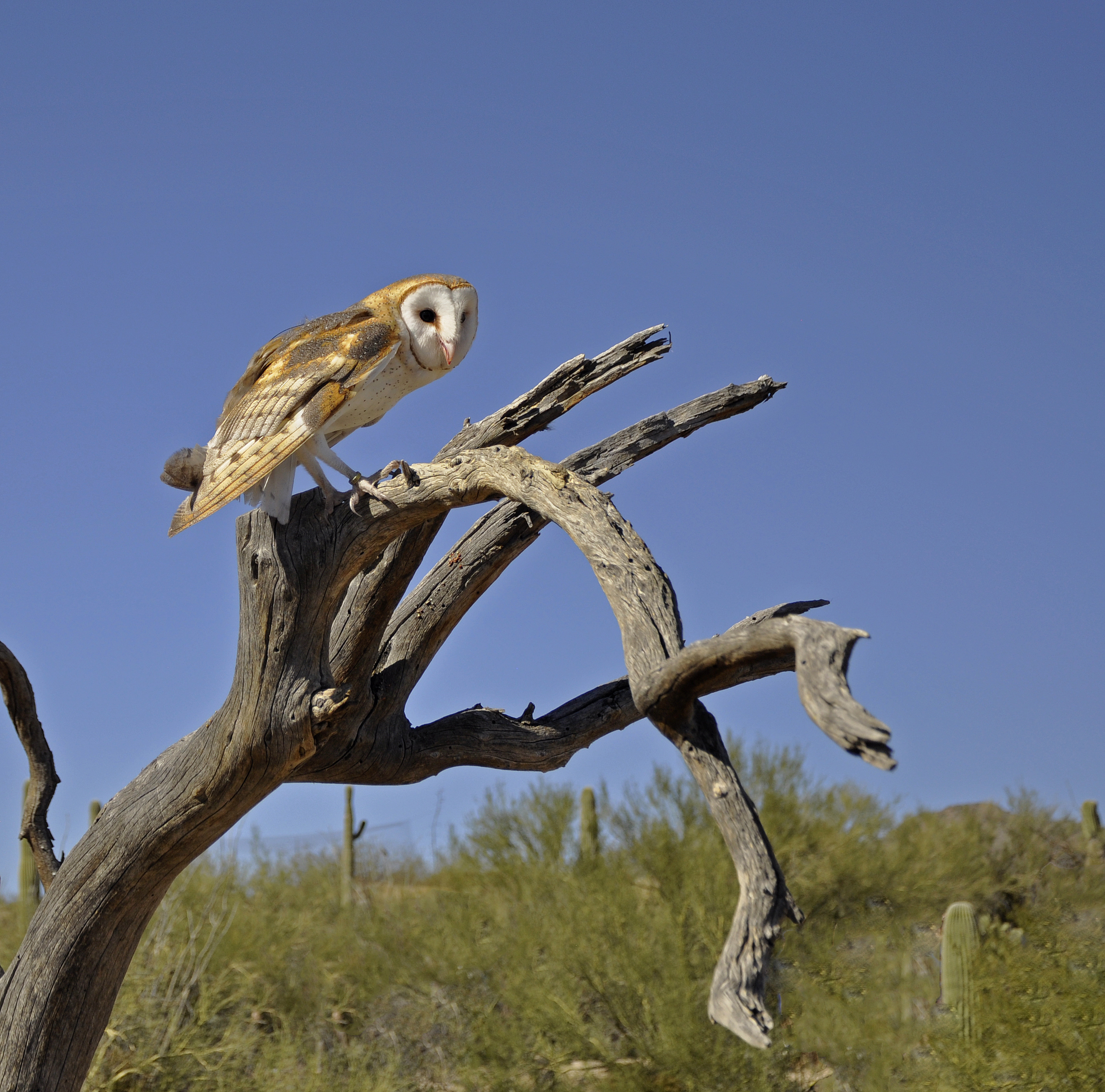
Ferruginous hawk in flight (top) and a barn owl (bottom) are just some of the birds that can be seen.

This birds-of-prey demonstration is held in the open desert and spectators watch from the flight path. The birds fly so close visitors often feel the brush of feathers. Weather permitting, the museum hosts two demonstrations daily from mid-October through mid-April. The birds fly completely untethered, without any jesses (leg straps) and most often without leg rings.

Only birds native to the Sonoran Desert Region are flown. A featured species is Harris's hawks, the only raptor species in the world to hunt as a family using strategy, like wolves. The morning and afternoon demonstrations showcase different species, so each is unique. Species include: Harris's hawk, peregrine falcons, barn owls, red-tailed hawks, ferruginous hawk, great horned owl, gray hawk, prairie falcon, and chihuahuan raven.

==== Docent stations ====
Docent Stations, with trained volunteer naturalists, are located throughout the museum grounds. At these stations, docents offer presentations with live reptiles, birds, or mammals, or with animal skulls, skeletons, or fossil remains. Some stations interpret the geology of the Sonoran Desert region including rock formations and semi-precious stones.

Tours are available through advanced reservations via the museum's website. Topics include: Zookeeper for a Day, Winged Wonders (Hummingbird Tour), Warden Aquarium Private Tour, Walk on the Wild Side, and the Reptiles, Amphibians, and Invertebrates Tour.

== Conservation education and science ==
For many years, the Museum has been involved in scientific investigations, including botanical field investigations, especially in Mexico, with population studies of Ironwood, and a major bi-national research program on migratory pollinators. Current work includes studies of pollination and seed dispersal (how plants survive and get around), and the effects of climate change on regional ecological communities. The Living Collections staff of the museum, are involved in collaborative species survival projects, working with outside agencies and scientists. These include salvage and recovery efforts on a variety of lower vertebrates, including the Tarahumara frog, Chiricahua leopard frog, Mexican garter snake, Sonoyta mud turtle, and a wide range of desert fishes.

=== Community outreach – the Desert Ark van and live animals ===
Desert Ark Community Programs feature live Sonoran Desert animals and may include interactive lectures, slide shows or activities. Museum staff members travel throughout Southern Arizona as well as areas within an 8-hour round-trip drive from the museum, although live animals are unable to travel outside the state of Arizona. For in-state programs, live animals may be used, and may include reptiles, birds, mammals and insects, although the particular animals vary by program.

=== Digital library ===
The Arizona-Sonora Desert Museum has a digital library containing thousands of photographs of plants and animals. The digital library is an interactive site that has a kid's page with videos, animal sounds, and games. Another interactive feature is the plant phenology section. Visitors can look at a specific species of plant or compare two plant species. In addition, the "Time of Year" feature allows users to select a date on the calendar to view what species are in flower or are expected to be in flower. Past dates will also provide temperature and precipitation data, whereas future dates will give average temperatures and chance of precipitation.

== Art Institute ==
The Art Institute opened in 2001 to promote conservation of the Sonoran Desert through art education including classes, art exhibits, and stewardship of the Museum art. The Art Institute offers a certificate program in nature illustration. Over 80 art classes offered throughout the year. The Institute offers art workshops focusing on specific areas, such as "Sonoran Desert Birds" and "Drawn to the Desert: Focus on the Sea of Cortez." The Art Institute also offers classes for in photography, ranging from "Photography Basics for Adjustable Cameras" to "Intermediate Nature Photography."

=== Ironwood gallery ===
The Ironwood Gallery hosts temporary exhibits by accomplished artists from southern Arizona, regional artists from throughout the Southwest and Mexico. It also hosts nationally recognized artists, both individually and through traveling exhibits, by the Society of Conservation Artists and (others).

== Desert Museum Press ==
Since 1995, the ASDM Press (Arizona-Sonora Desert Museum Press) has published more than 40 books or guides, including 22 popular books on the natural history of the Sonoran Desert Region. It has published six picture books for children in both English and Spanish and several pocket guides to hummingbirds and other birds, plants, lizards, snakes, beetles, etc. In 2000, ASDM Press co-published the 628-page "bible" of the Sonoran Desert, A Natural History of the Sonoran Desert, with the University of California Press. In collaboration with the University of Arizona Press, the division has co-published several technical books in the Studies in Natural History Series, featuring research on topics from pollinators, to water in the desert, to the Sea of Cortez. In the first few years publications were mainly small paperback books. But since 2000, more substantial volumes are common, including the recent field guides to mountain wildflowers and mountain trees, as well as the full-color, 232-page Natural History of the Santa Catalina Mountains, with an Introduction to the Madrean Sky Islands (2013).

== Operations and support ==
The museum is a not-for-profit 501(c)(3) institution. Its primary source of revenue is from the sale of admission tickets and memberships. Revenue from grants, major donors, bequests and planned gifts, special events, sponsorships, and an annual fund also contribute to the museum's funding.

=== Docents and volunteers ===
The Desert Museum benefits from the service of approximately 500 volunteers, who assist the approximately 120 paid staff. Collectively, Desert Museum volunteers contribute about 130,000 hours per year.

Since its inception in 1972, the Docent Program has become a hallmark of the museum and is recognized by the industry as one of the finest docent corps in existence today. Each of the nearly 200 docents undergoes a 15-week training program in natural history education.

Another 300 volunteers support the museum in a variety of departmental assignments. The ASDM Internship Program offers a few unpaid, educational appointments for college students.

== Hal Gras and the Desert Ark program ==
One of the most influential staff members in the history of the Arizona-Sonora Desert Museum was Harold W. "Hal" Gras Jr., more commonly known as Hal Gras. According to David Leighton, historian for the Arizona Daily Star newspaper, Gras was born in New Jersey, in 1919. After serving in World War II and getting married, he relocated to El Paso, Texas where he received his college degree in broadcasting. In 1950, he moved to Tucson, Arizona, where he worked in radio and then television.

In 1952, when the Arizona Sonora Desert Museum opened its doors, Hal Gras and his wife Natie attended its opening and, as a result Gras began hosting the museum's TV show, Desert Trails (renamed The Desert Speaks when it moved to KUAT around 1990). The show first aired in 1953, and would run for 32 years, with Gras hosting 1,551 shows. From 1955 to 1972, Gras was the public relations director for the museum. He visited local clubs and talked about the museum. Though he had little or no experience with animals, he started bringing some along with him for his appearances. Soon the popularity of his talks increased and he started bringing creatures from the museum to schools, hospitals, county fairs, etc. The program and the car that Gras brought the animals in both came to be called "The Desert Ark".

When Gras retired in 1985, he had presented a total of 5,382 Desert Ark programs. A few years after his retirement, a small street south of the Arizona-Sonora Desert Museum, along Kinney Road, was named Hal Gras Road in his honor. He would die in 1999.

== Gallery ==
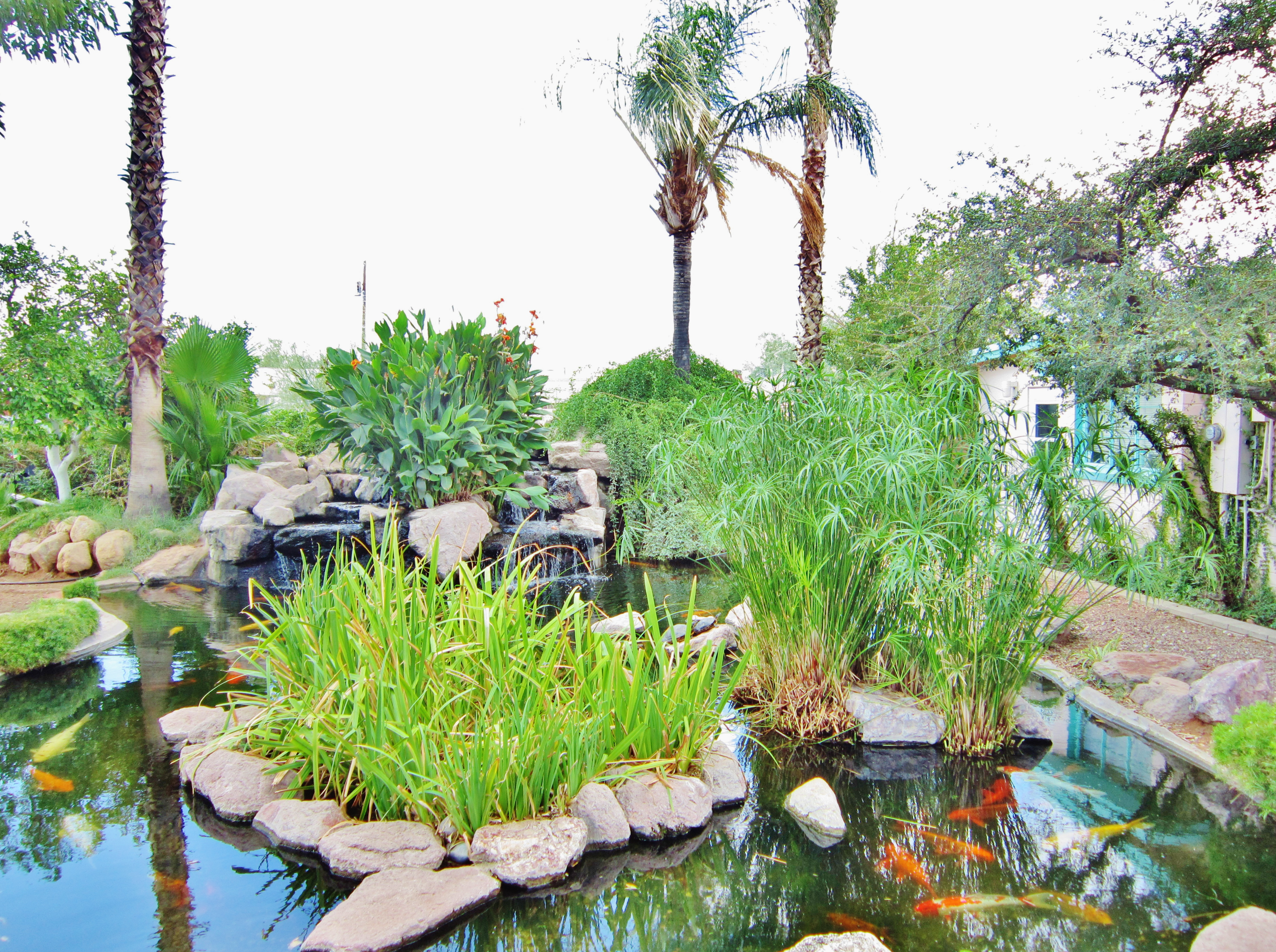
View along a walking path.

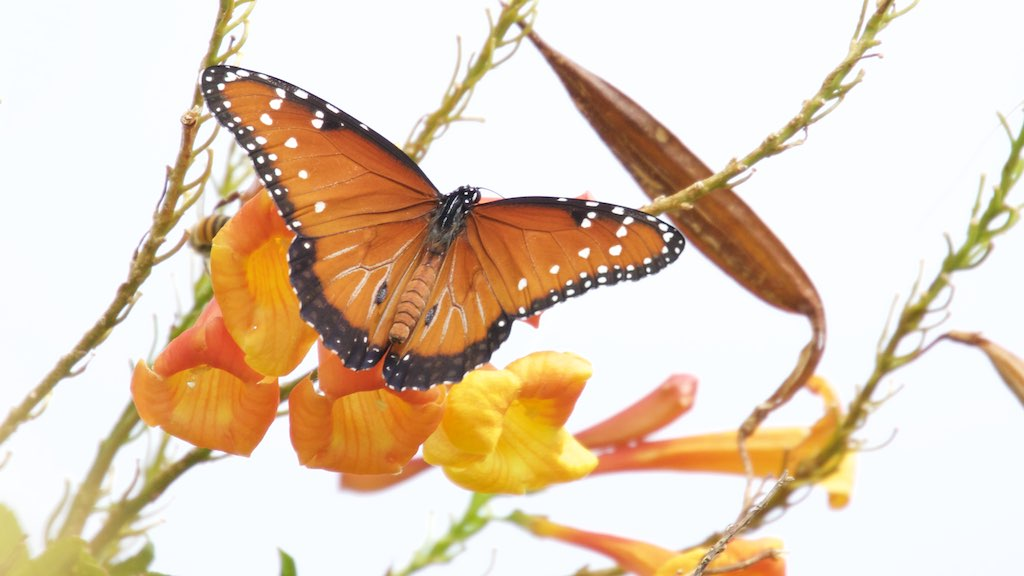
Milkweed butterfly.

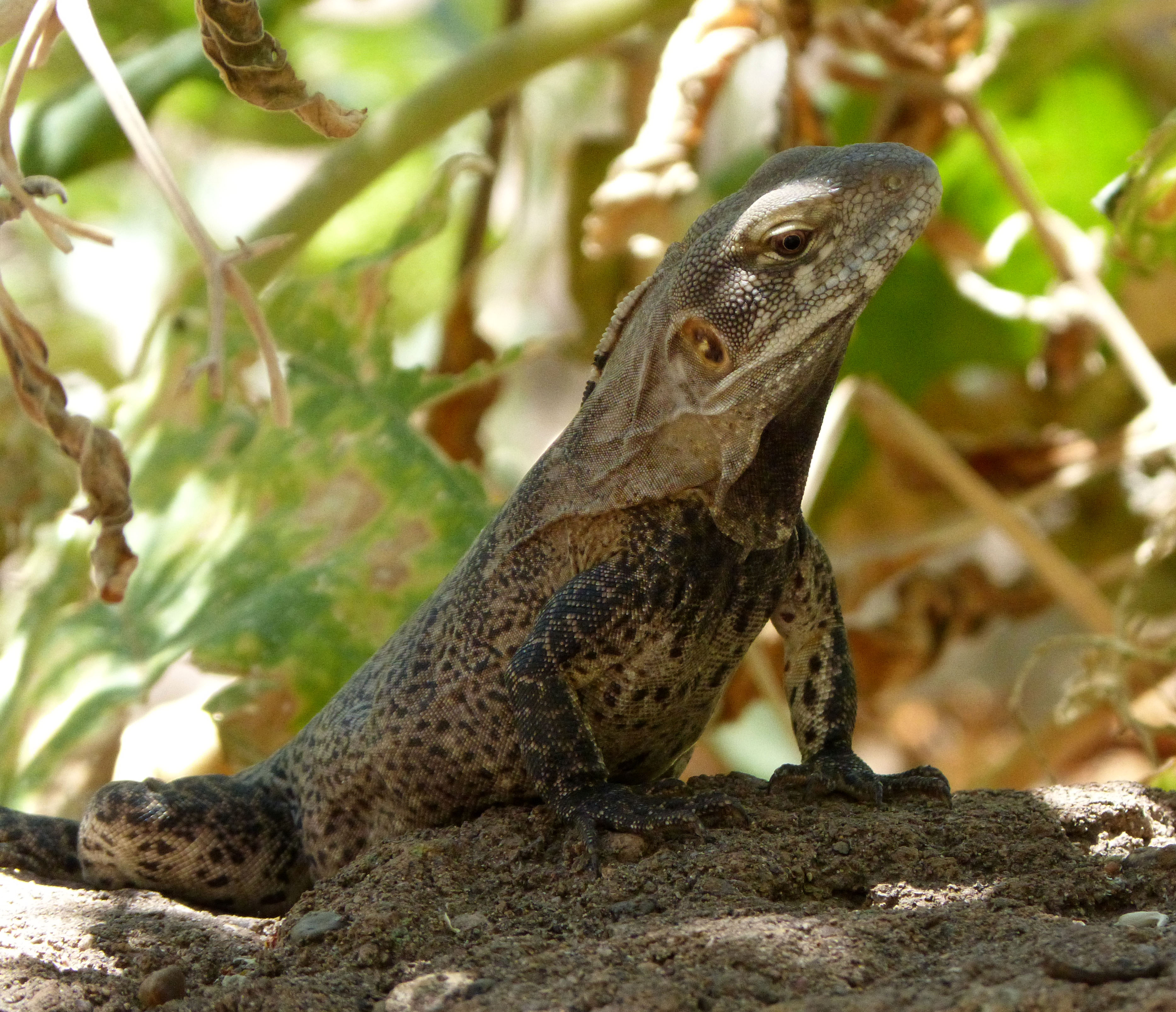
Ctenosaura up close.

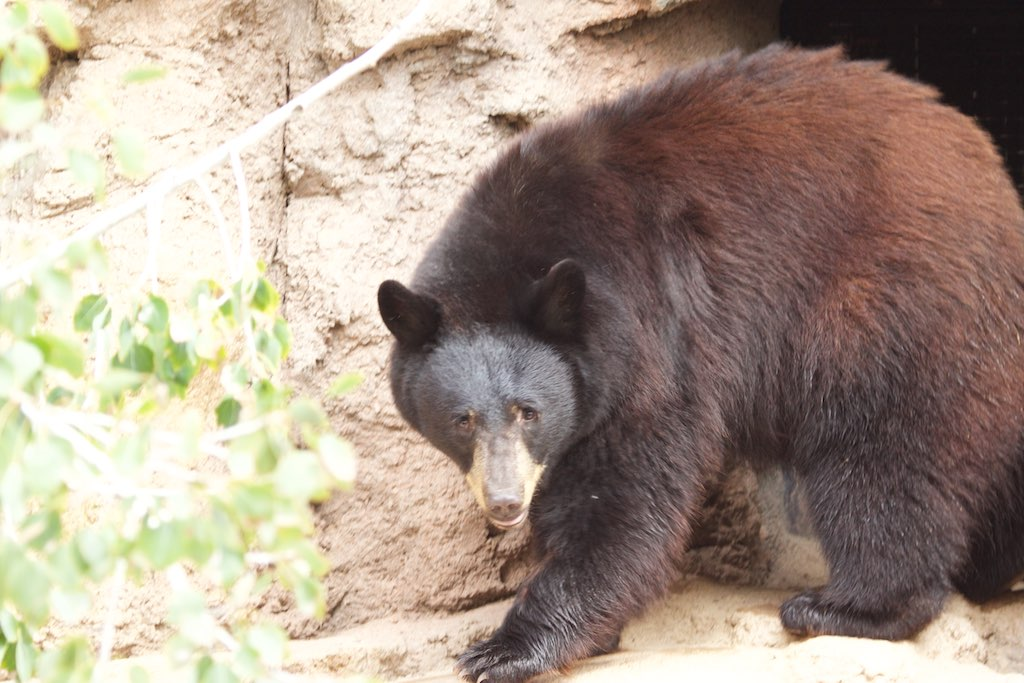
Black bear in one of the exhibits.

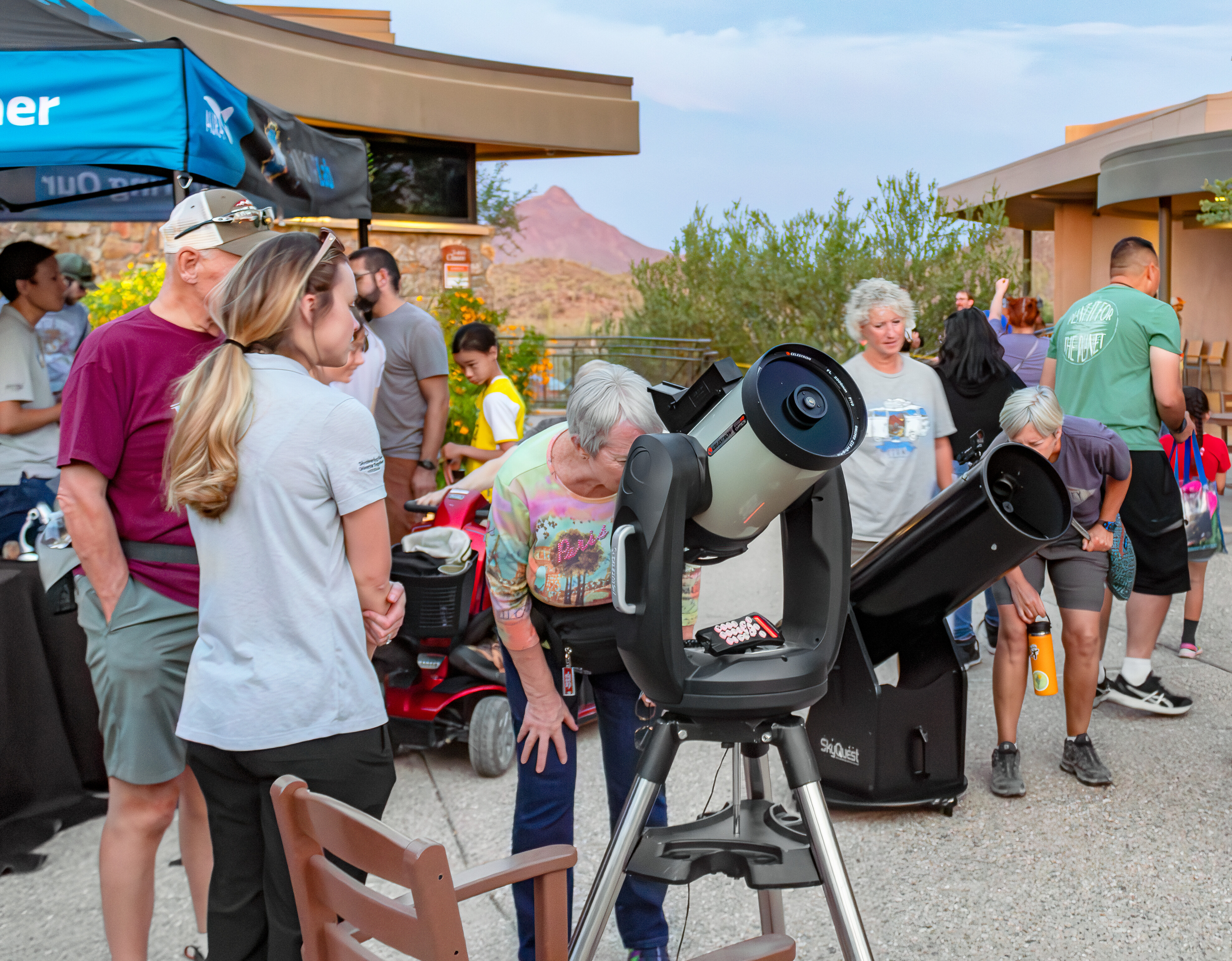
Cool Summer Nights event.

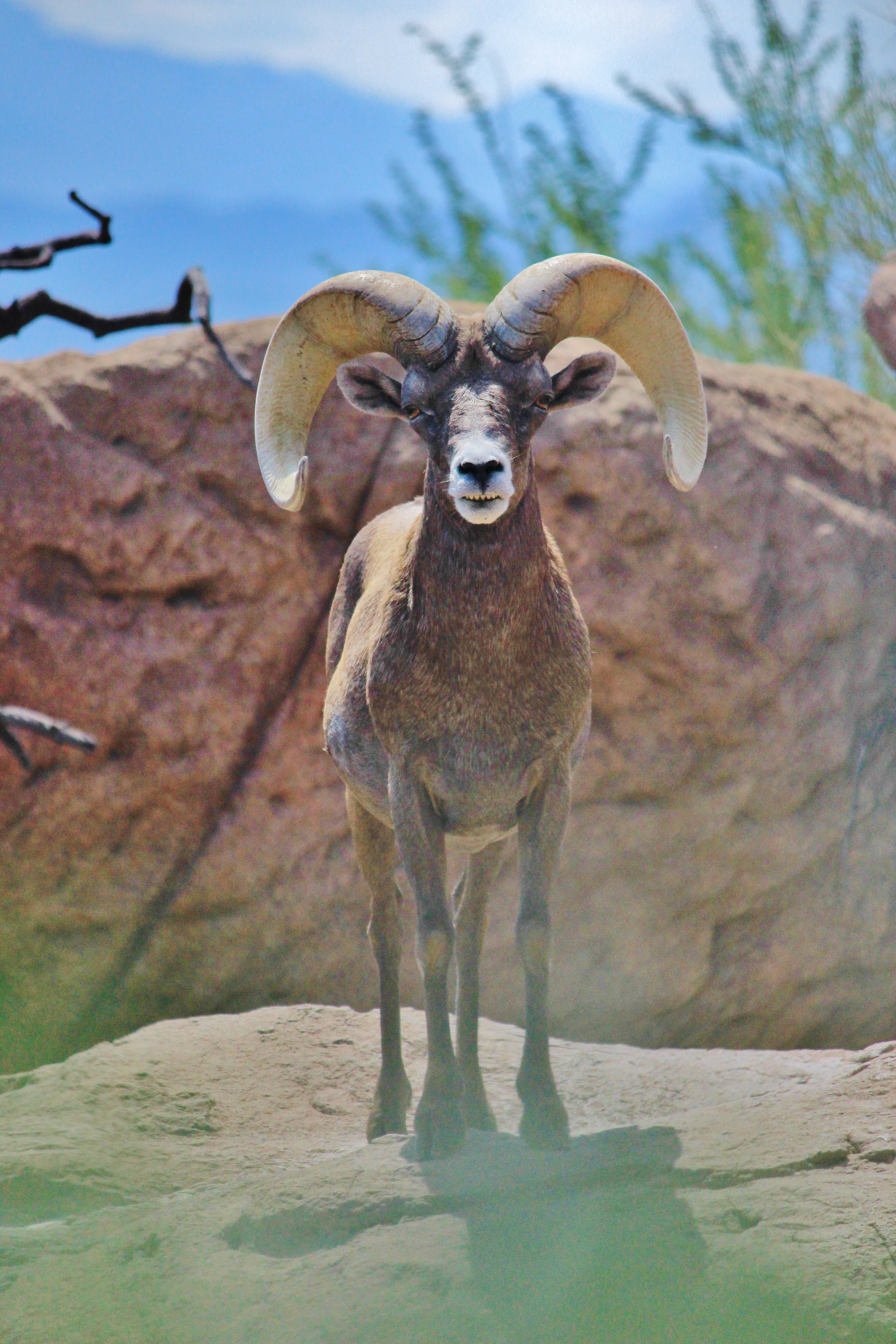
Bighorn sheep (Ovis canadensis)

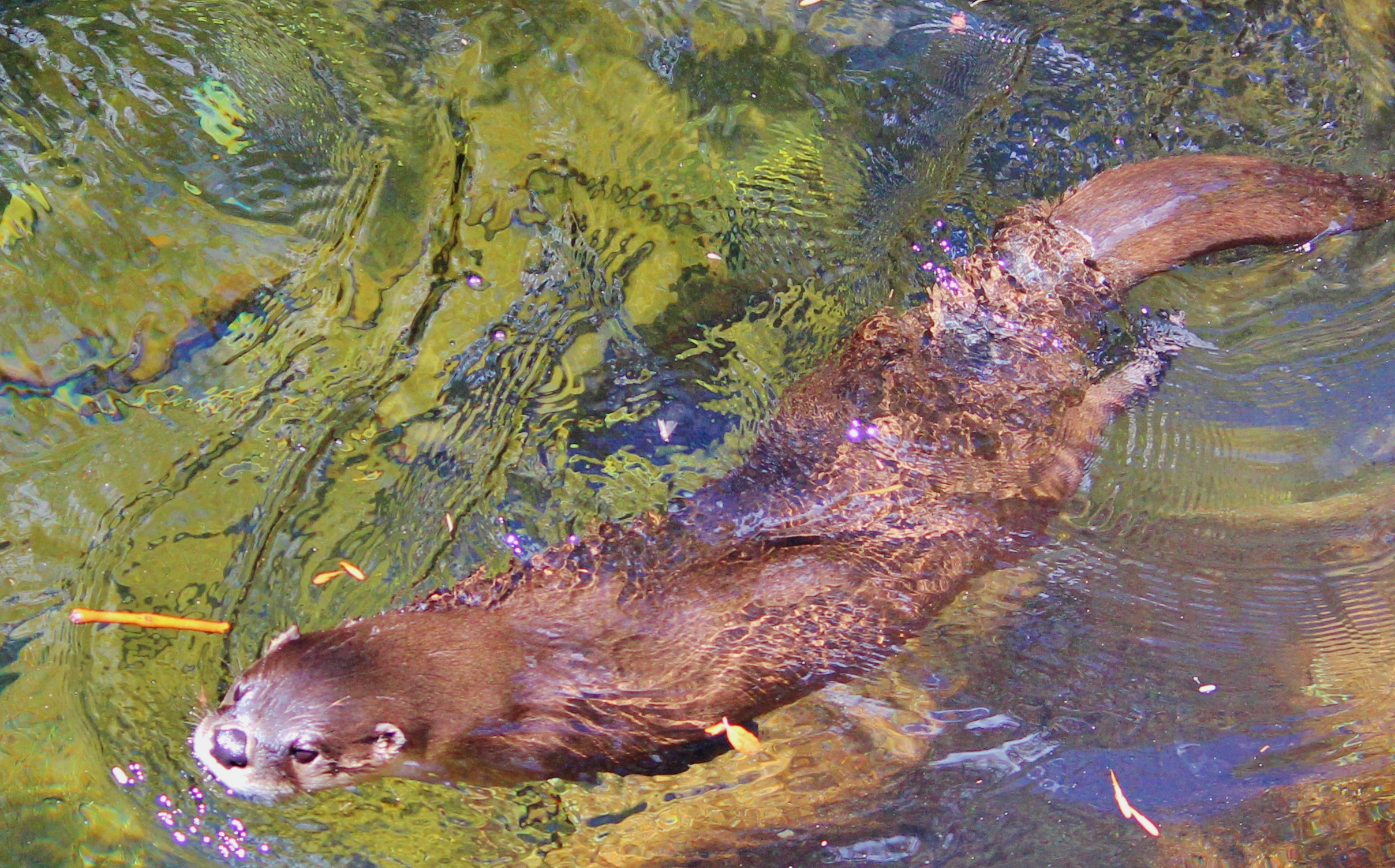
Otter in a pond.

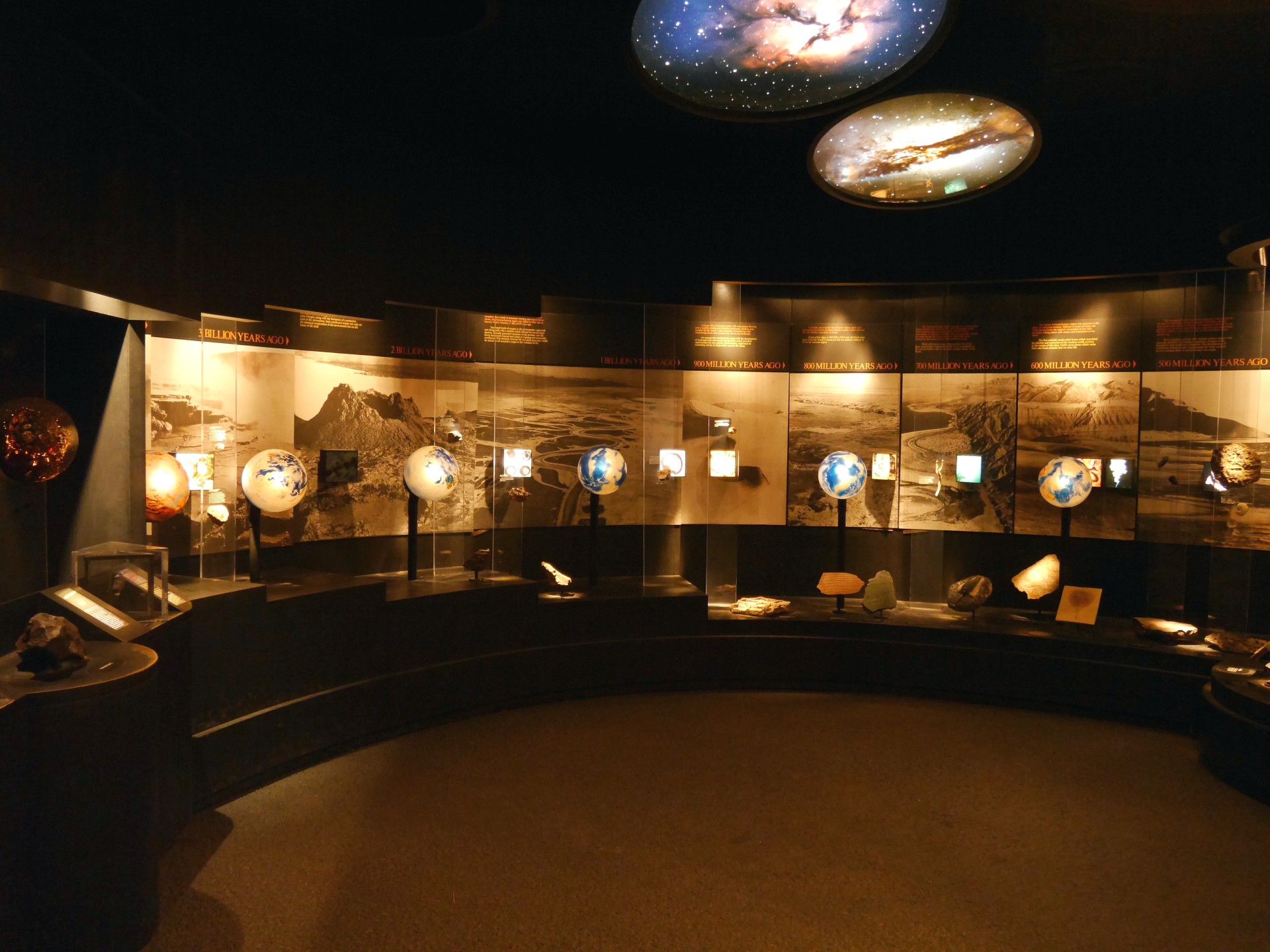
Exhibit inside the museum.

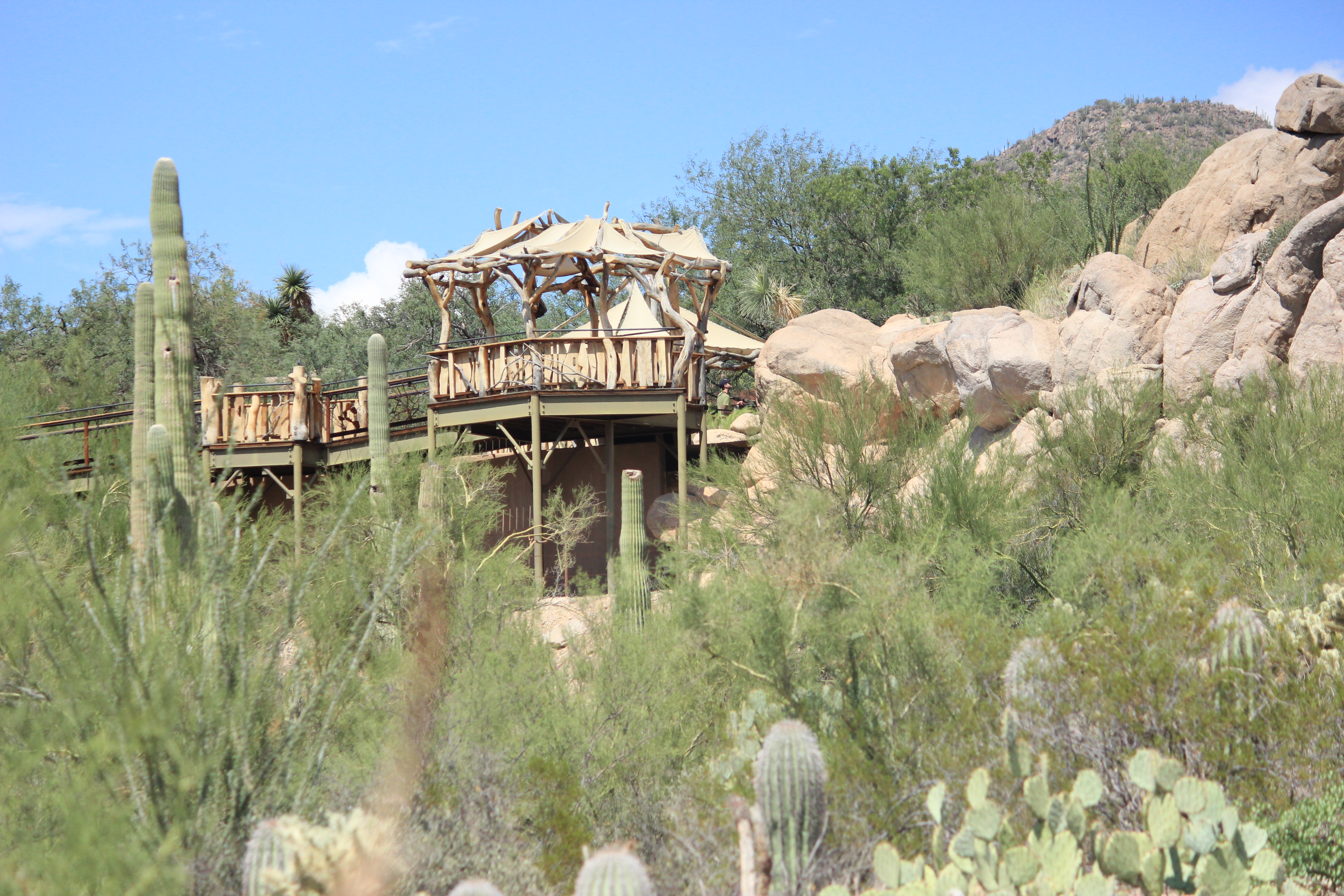
A viewing station that overlooks the landscape.

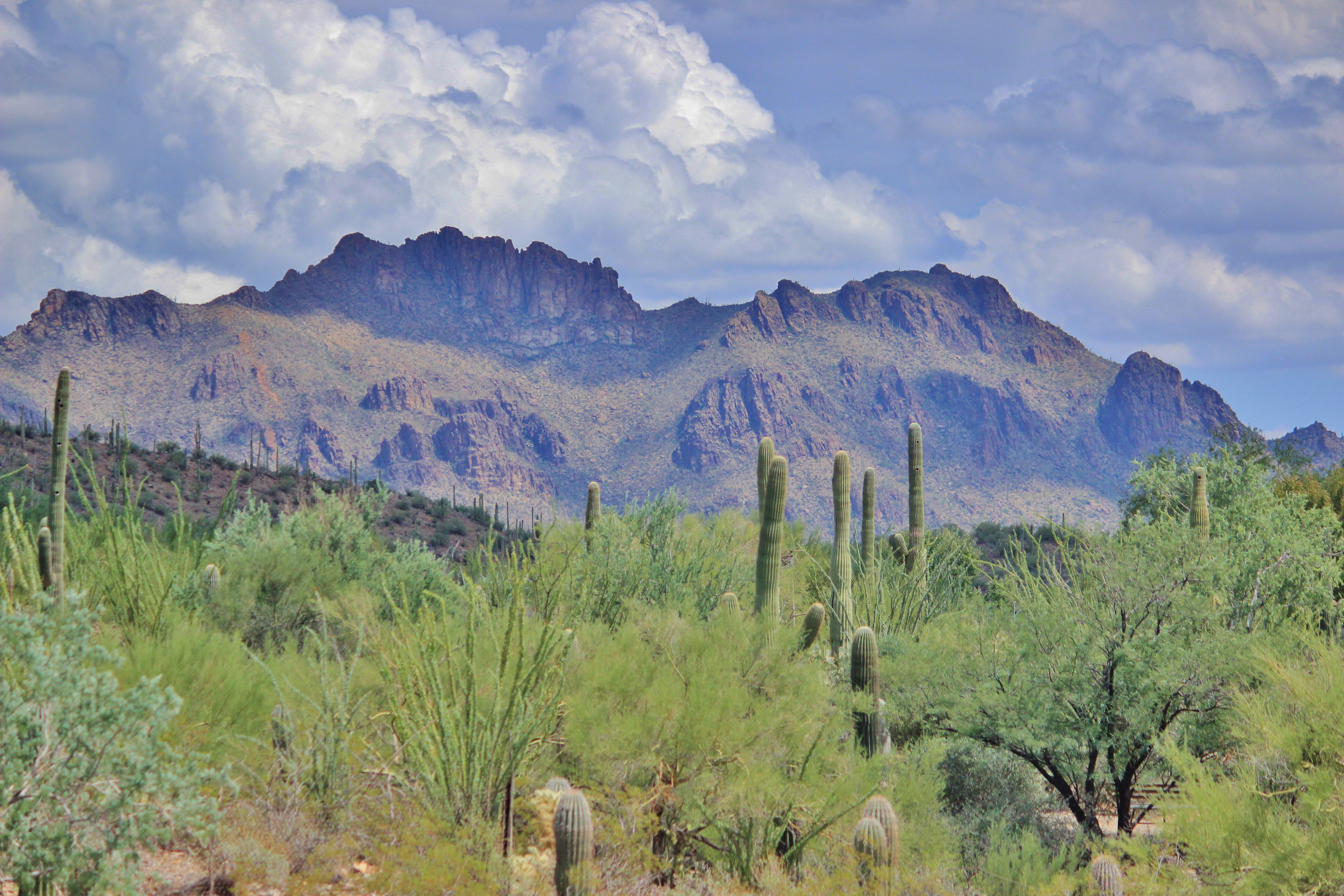
Landscape with mountains in view.

== See also ==
- List of botanical gardens and arboretums in Arizona
