= Marion C. Loizeaux =

American physician

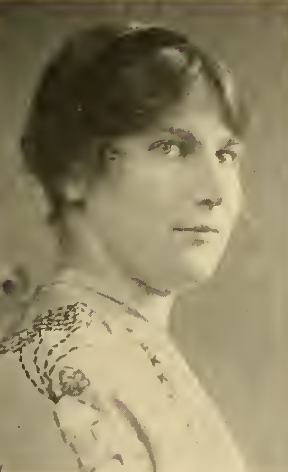
- Marion C. Loizeaux, from the 1927 yearbook of Wellesley College
- Born: December 20, 1904; New York City
- Occupations: Physician, surgeon

Marion Cotton Loizeaux (born December 20, 1904) was an American physician who served in World War II, and subsequently helped to care for its veterans. The New York Times described her as "the only woman surgeon with the United States Army in the European Theatre of Operations" in 1943.

== Early life and education ==
Loizeaux was born in New York City, the daughter of Paul Howard Loizeaux and Lucy Biggs Cotton Loizeaux. Her father was an interior decorator.

She graduated from Wellesley College in 1927, and completed her medical degree at Cornell University Medical College in 1931.

== Career ==
Loizeaux returned to Wellesley College to be assistant physician on staff there in the 1930s.

During World War II, she was based in England. She worked for the British Ministry of Health in 1941, and was one of the first American women doctors serving with the WACs overseas. As "the first woman doctor to be commissioned in the European theater", she held the rank of first lieutenant, and became a captain and a major in the Army Medical Corps. Her work was recognized with a Bronze Star medal and a Battle Star.

After the war, she lived in Boston, and was appointed by the Veterans Administration (VA) as a consultant on the care of women veterans in New England. In the 1950s and 1960s, she was chief of the geriatric department, and head of a rehabilitation program for elderly disabled veterans, at the Albany VA Hospital. "The way back for the disabled oldsters is sometimes long," she told an interviewer in 1959, "but for some it eventually leads out of the hospital and into a new life." She also taught at Albany Medical College.

== Publications ==
- "Palliative Irradiation of Gastric Cancer" (1935, with George T. Pack, Isabel M. Scharnagel, and Edith H. Quimby)
- "Psychological remotivation of the chronically ill medical patient: A quantitative study in rehabilitation methodology" (1961, with Leo Shatin and Paul Brown)
