= Washington Township, Sanilac County, Michigan =

Washington Township, Michigan
- Township
- Location within the state of Michigan Washington Township, Michigan (the United States)
- Coordinates: 43°23′15″N 82°40′52″W
- Country: United States
- State: Michigan
- County: Sanilac

Area
  - Total: 36.1 sq mi (93.6 km^{2})
  - Land: 36.1 sq mi (93.6 km^{2})
  - Water: 0 sq mi (0.0 km^{2})
- Elevation: 758 ft (231 m)

Population (2020)
  - Total: 1,524
  - Density: 42.2/sq mi (16.3/km^{2})
- Time zone: UTC-5 (Eastern (EST))
  - Summer (DST): UTC-4 (EDT)
- FIPS code: 26-84140
- GNIS feature ID: 1627217

Washington Township is a civil township of Sanilac County in the U.S. state of Michigan. The population was 1,524 at the 2020 census.

== Geography ==
According to the United States Census Bureau, the township has a total area of 36.1 square miles (93 km^{2}), all land.

== History ==
Among previously existing settlements in Washington Township is Pack's Mills. This small community on the Black River was named after George Pack, Jr. (brother of John Pack), the owner of the sawmill that gave the town its name. George Pack, Jr. became the postmaster of Pack's Mills in 1868. The post office ceased operations in February 1876. Today, Packs Mills Road runs through the area.

- Applegate is a village in the southeast corner of the township.
- Carsonville is a village along M-46 at the northern boundary of the township with Bridgehampton Township and lies partially within both townships.

== Demographics ==
As of the census of 2000, there were 1,636 people, 610 households, and 477 families residing in the township. The population density was 45.3 inhabitants per square mile (17.5/km^{2}). There were 670 housing units at an average density of 18.5 per square mile (7.2/km^{2}). The racial makeup of the township was 97.86% White, 0.06% African American, 0.24% Native American, 0.18% Asian, 0.43% from other races, and 1.22% from two or more races. Hispanic or Latino of any race were 2.32% of the population.

There were 610 households, out of which 34.9% had children under the age of 18 living with them, 62.5% were married couples living together, 10.5% had a female householder with no husband present, and 21.8% were non-families. 18.7% of all households were made up of individuals, and 8.5% had someone living alone who was 65 years of age or older. The average household size was 2.68 and the average family size was 3.04.

In the township the population was spread out, with 27.9% under the age of 18, 7.0% from 18 to 24, 25.7% from 25 to 44, 24.8% from 45 to 64, and 14.6% who were 65 years of age or older. The median age was 38 years. For every 100 females, there were 99.3 males. For every 100 females age 18 and over, there were 95.7 males.

The median income for a household in the township was $35,602, and the median income for a family was $38,684. Males had a median income of $28,214 versus $19,375 for females. The per capita income for the township was $16,015. About 7.6% of families and 10.0% of the population were below the poverty line, including 13.8% of those under age 18 and 7.8% of those age 65 or over.
