= Arthur Newton Pack =

American naturalist and writer (1893–1975)

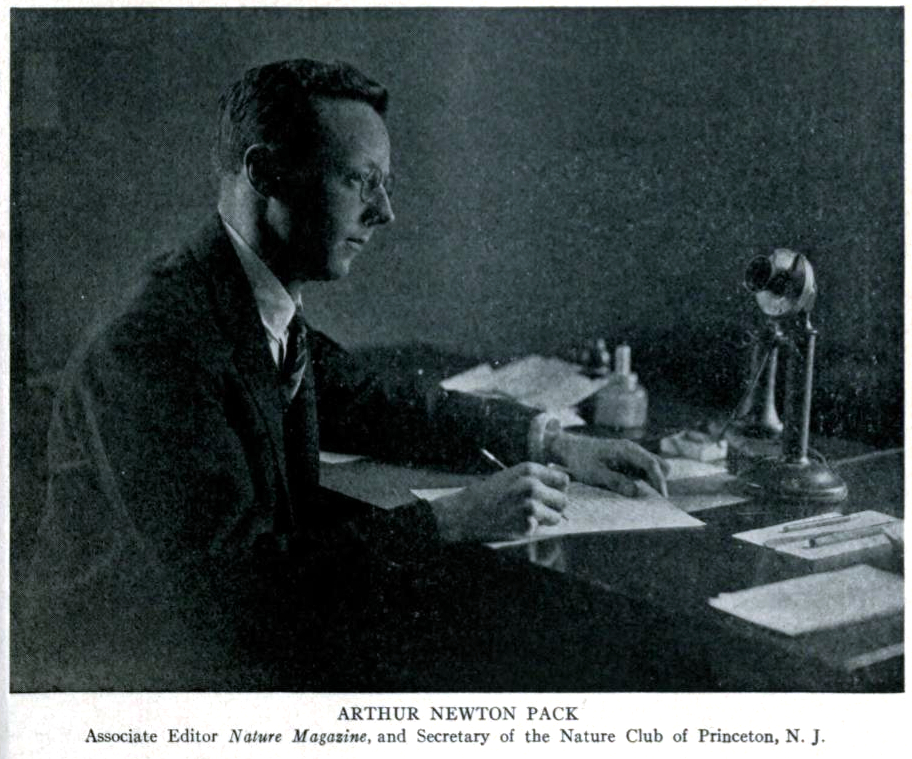

Arthur Newton Pack (February 20, 1893 – December 6, 1975) was a wealthy American naturalist and writer who founded the American Nature Association and the periodical Nature Magazine along with Percival Sheldon Risdale. Living in Tucson, Arizona he helped establish the Arizona-Sonora Desert Museum and set up a million-dollar trust for St. Mary's Hospital. In 1952 he was declared as Man of the Year in Tucson.

Pack was born in Cleveland, Ohio to Charles Lathrop Pack, a wealthy American timber businessman and his wife Alice Gertrude Hatch. Although the family lived at Lakewood Township, New Jersey, he was sent away to school in Florida at the Adirondack-Florida School and later at Williams College in Massachusetts. Graduating from the Harvard Business School in 1915, he joined the United States Ordnance Department in Washington DC and was posted in England during World War I.

Along with his father Charles, he founded the American Nature Association and helped establish the Arizona Sonora Desert Museum in 1952 along with William Carr. He bought Ghost Ranch in New Mexico from where he wrote several books including the autobiographical We Called it Ghost Ranch. He gifted the ranch to the Board of Christian Education Presbyterian Church in 1955 for use as a retreat and for education.

Pack wrote several books. He wrote Our Vanishing Forests in 1926 where he highlighted the issues faced by American forestry. In 1936 he published The Challenge of Leisure in which he predicted that Americans would have only two hours of work a day and that they would need to prepare to use their leisure time for constructive activities. He wrote again in 1933 on forestry in Forestry: an economic challenge.

Pack married twice. He married Eleanor "Brownie" Brown in 1919 and they had three children. After a separation, he married Phoebe Katherine Finley in 1936 and they had two children.
