= Ward E. Pack =

American politician

Member of the Utah Territorial Legislature
- In office 1876, 1880

Personal details
- Born: Ward Eaton Pack; April 17, 1834 Watertown, New York, U.S.
- Died: November 16, 1907 (aged 73)
- Parent(s): John Pack; Julia Ives
- Profession: Politician

Ward Eaton Pack (April 17, 1834 – November 16, 1907) was a member of the Utah Territorial Legislature and a local-level leader in the Church of Jesus Christ of Latter-day Saints (LDS Church).

Pack was born in Watertown, New York, to John Pack and Julia Ives (John's first of eight wives) as their first child. His parents joined the Church of the Latter Day Saints in 1836 and moved to Kirtland, Ohio. They later moved to Missouri and then Nauvoo, Illinois, where Pack was baptized.

In 1848, Pack came to the Salt Lake Valley. He first settled in Salt Lake City. In 1854 he went on a mission to the Hawaiian Islands. In 1855 while still on his mission in Hawai'i Pack was appointed to start a school at Lana'i to teach the Hawai'ian members of the Church the English language.

After his return from his mission, Pack was involved in saw milling and farming. He lived in Bountiful, Utah, and then in Kamas, Utah. In 1876 and 1880, he represented Summit County in the Utah Territorial legislature. He was mission president in Hawaii from 1876 to 1878 and again from 1889 to 1892. In 1877 Pack met with King Kalakaua and received permission for missionaries of The Church of Jesus Christ of Latter-day Saints to perform marriages in Hawai'i.

He also served as a counselor in the Summit Stake Presidency from 1881 to 1901.

Pack also was a member of two of Utah's many state constitutional conventions.
