= George Pack Jr. =

American businessman and postmaster

- Born: 1794; Saint John, New Brunswick
- Died: April 15, 1875 (aged 80–81); Pack's Mills, Michigan
- Occupation: Businessman
- Spouse: Maria Lathrop
- Children: 10 including George Willis Pack
- Parent: George Pack Sr.

George Pack Jr. (1794 – April 15, 1875) was a businessman, landowner, sawmill operator, and postmaster on the Lower Peninsula of Michigan. The town of Pack's Mills of which he was also postmaster, was named after him. Pack's son George Willis Pack; grandson Charles Lathrop Pack and great-grandson Randolph Greene Pack followed him in the timber business in Michigan, New York and beyond.

== Early life and family ==
Pack had moved to Michigan from upstate New York, in 1848. Born in Canada, Pack had first moved to Jefferson County, New York, with his father, George Pack Sr., and 10 of his siblings, including brother John Pack.

From Jefferson County, Pack removed to Madison County, New York, to be near the parents of his wife, Maria Lathrop Pack. After a few years "near Maria's father, Abram Lathrop, in Madison Clounty; they then moved twelve miles away to Peterboro", about 25 miles (40 km) east and south of Syracuse. In search of new opportunities, he used proceeds from the sale of a farm near Watertown, New York, to purchase 80 acres (320,000 m^{2}) just outside Lexington, Michigan.

With ten children in tow, George and Maria Pack boarded "an Erie Canal sidewheeler [and] rode it to the end of the line at Buffalo and from there headed up Lake Erie to Lake Huron, disembarking at Lexington, on the eastern shore of the Michigan thumb, overlooking Lake Huron", where they spent the next 13 years.

== Business career ==
It was while in Lexington, that Pack made his first investment in timber. He "paid $1,600 for 720 acres of timberland near the Black River. The acreage was located ten miles north of Lexington, near a town called Farmers, now known as Carsonville".

Pack opened his first sawmill in Washington Township, in 1856. The second was opened just a year later, in the same township. The town of Pack's Mills was established nearby. A grist mill and then a flour mill followed soon thereafter. By 1876, "sixteen hundred acres would be in the Pack name".
