= George Willis Pack =

American lumberman and philanthropist (1831–1906)

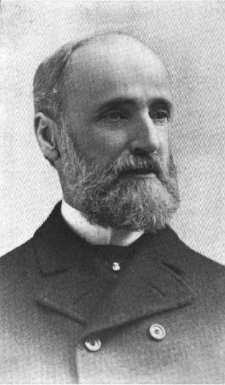
- Born: June 6, 1831; Peterboro, New York, US
- Died: August 31, 1906 (aged 75); Long Island, New York, US
- Burial place: Lake View Cemetery
- Occupation: Lumberman
- Known for: Philanthropist in Asheville, North Carolina
- Children: Charles Lathrop Pack
- Parent: George Pack Jr.

George Willis Pack (June 6, 1831 – August 31, 1906) was an American philanthropist, lumberman, and railroad president. Building on his father's legacy in the Lower Peninsula of Michigan, Pack successfully developed many timber businesses and became one of Michigan's first millionaires. He was also a leading citizen of Cleveland, Ohio, and a noted resident and benefactor of Asheville, North Carolina. He donated five properties to the City of Asheville, including a school, a library, public parks, and land for the county's courthouse. In 1960, the Asheville Citizen-Times called him "Asheville's greatest benefactor."

His son, Charles Lathrop Pack, was a noted forester and conservationist. His grandson, Randolph Greene Pack, was a forester and philanthropist.

== Early life ==
George Willis Pack was born on June 6, 1831, in Fenner Township, Madison County, New York. His parents were Maria Lathrop and George Pack Jr., a farmer and postmaster. His mother was from Connecticut and his father's family had a long history in New Jersey. Pack attended the common school in Peterboro and was raised in the Presbyterian faith. One of his Sunday school teachers was the abolitionist and philanthropist, Gerrit Smith.

When Pack was seventeen, he went with his father to Sanilac County, Michigan, where they established a farm on government land. His family lived in Lexington, Michigan, from 1848 to 1857. In 1857, his father established Pack's Mills, a sawmill, in the Black River area of Port Huron, Michigan, followed by a second sawmill near Lexington.

== Career ==
Pack began his timber career working in his father's sawmills where he gained knowledge of forestry and logging. He began working independently in 1854 and became a successful lumberman. His personal and corporate land holdings grew to 5,000 acres (2,000 ha) of timber in Huron County, Michigan, and 25,000 acres (10,000 ha) of pine lands along the Pinnebog River in Michigan.

In 1861, Pack and John L. Woods established Carrington, Pack & Company, a sawmill in Sand Beach Township, Michigan, that operated there for nine years. In 1862, Pack was elected to represent Sand Beach on the Huron County Board of Supervisors. In 1870, Pack and Woods partnered with Jeremiah Jenks to establish a second sawmill, Pack, Jenks & Company, in Rock Falls, Michigan, which operated for eleven years. His third firm, Woods & Company, was established in Port Crescent, Michigan, and operated from 1870 to 1878.

He formed Pack, Woods & Company in 1877 in Alpena, Michigan, which operated for ten years. In addition to John Woods, this partnership included Pack's brother, Greene Pack, and E. F. Holmes who both brought experience in manufacturing and wholesaling lumber. The company purchased some 200 acres (81 ha) of land along the Pine River and Au Sable River in Michigan and built a sawmill, tram, and dock. Pack, Woods & Company officially incorporated on March 31, 1882, with Pack serving as its president. Beginning in 1882, the company operated in Oscoda, Michigan, building and expanding the community. Its facility expanded in 1884 and was considered one of the finest in the world, according to American Lumberman. The company manufactured 1,250,000,000 feet (380,000,000 m) of lumber and more than 1,000,000 barrels of salt in its nineteen years of operation.

Pack also established Woods, Perry & Co. in Cleveland, Ohio, around 1883, followed by Pack, Woods & Co. in 1887 and Pack, Grey & Co., also in Cleveland. These businesses made Pack a millionaire. In 1893, Pack purchased the Montford residential development in Asheville, North Carolina, in a bankruptcy auction. Later, he joined a partnership that developed land at the foot of Sunset Mountain, near North Charlotte Street.

In March 1895, Pack became the president of the Detroit Railway, a collaborative electric streetcar venture formed with his brothers Greene and Albert Pack in 1894. In April 1895, Detroit's Board of Works ordered the railway to remove some of its streetcar poles, giving part of the railway's territory to another company. This resulted in a court case that went to the Supreme Court of the United States in 1898. However, Pack continued expanding the railway, offering $1,800,000 in bonds ($68,032,800 in 2022 money) in November 1895. In 1898, the railroad included 62 miles (100 km) of tracks in Detroit and was valued at $600,000 ($22,677,600 in 2022 money). Around 1906, the railway was replaced and absorbed by the Detroit United Railway.

== Philanthropy ==
Pack became a generous philanthropist to the City of Asheville. Because he disliked the "ragamuffins" in the city's square, Pack purchased a lot and hired the architect Willis Bros. to design a school for the Asheville Free Kindergarten Association in June 1892. The Sarah Garrison Kindergarten building cost between $2,500 and $3,000 ($87,491 to $104,989 in 2022 money) and was paid for by Pack. He also paid for 25 percent of the school's operating costs and one teacher's salary until his death. Pack also funded the salaries of two teachers at the Beaumont Street School, the city's first public school for African Americans.

Pack donated more than $10,000 to help create Mission Hospital and gave $1,000 toward the construction of the YMCA in Asheville. He contributed to the Flower Mission and, during the unusually cold winter of 1898 to 1899, Pack made generous contributions to help Asheville's poor. He sent a gift of $500 to North Carolina's regiment in the Spanish–American War after learning that the soldiers had run out of money for necessities. He donated 11 acres (4.5 ha) for Aston Park, 4 acres (1.6 ha) for Montford Park, and land for Magnolia Park. The latter became a public park for African Americans.

Pack donated $2,000 ($75,592 in 2022 money) for a monument to former North Carolina Governor Zebulon Vance in 1896. The community and other donors added $1,300 to the Vance Monument Fund. In 1899, Pack offered to purchase the former First National Bank building to consolidate the city's library collections as the Asheville Public Library. He paid some $30,000 for the building ($1,133,880 in 2022 money) and also covered the expense of upfitting the building. In 1911, Asheville Public Library was renamed Pack Memorial Public Library.

In 1901, Pack contributed land for a new Buncombe County courthouse; at the time, the county lacked the resources to acquire this property. A condition of Pack's gift was that the former courthouse site became part of the public square, and the area was named Pack Square Park as a result. The property's deed was transferred on May 11, 1900, and the new courthouse was completed in 1903.

== Personal life ==
In 1854, Pack married Frances Brewster Farman of Milwaukee in Detroit. She was the daughter of Captain Samuel W. Farman and was a member of a prominent family from Detroit, Michigan. Their children were son Charles Lathrop Pack (1857) and daughters Mary (1860), Millicent (1865, died as an infant), and Beulah (1869).

The Pack family moved to Port Huron, Michigan, in 1857; Fort Gratiot Township, Michigan, in 1858; and Sand Beach Township, Michigan, in 1861. They moved to East Cleveland, Ohio, on June 25, 1870, where Pack became a leading citizen. In 1887, Pack purchased two adjacent houses on Euclid Avenue, known as "millionaires' row" in the Gilded Age. One house was the residence of Pack and his wife, while the other was for his daughter and son-in-law. Pack hired architect Charles F. Schweinfurth to renovate and expand the properties, resulting in a combined thirty rooms with furniture designed by the architect.

Pack went to Asheville, North Carolina, for his wife's health in 1884. The couple stayed at one of the city's finest hotels, the Swannanoa Hotel. However, as the Swannanoa lacked indoor plumbing, Pack ordered a bathtub and had it installed in the hotel, creating Asheville's first bathroom with running water.

Finding Asheville appealing, the Packs built a large home, Manyoaks, at 140 Merrimon Avenue in 1885 (now demolished). They used Manyoaks as their winter home for nearly twenty years, retaining a Cleveland, Ohio residence for the summer. Pack became a civil leader and philanthropist in Asheville. He advocated for electric lights, paved streets, and pedestrian sidewalks in the city's square. He also pushed to improve the city's sewer system.

Pack was elected to serve on the University of Michigan Board of Regents in 1857. He supported Abraham Lincoln and served as a Presidential Elector for Lincoln in 1864, representing Michigan's 6th district. He was interested in golf and donated a golf link and an associated building to the Swannanoa Hunt Club (now the Grove Park Inn golf course), establishing one of the first golf courses in North Carolina. He was a member of both that club and the Asheville Club in North Carolina. In Cleveland, he was a member of the Union Club and The Country Club.

Pack's health declined by 1900 and he moved to the seaside community of Southampton, Long Island, New York as his doctors recommended living at sea level for a heart condition. Pack died in Southampton at the age of 75 on August 31, 1906. He was buried in Lake View Cemetery in Cleveland on September 4, 1906. His casket was escorted by three representatives from Asheville: James Gibbon Merrimon of Buncombe County, F. Stikelfeather of the City of Asheville, and M. C. McCloud of the Asheville Club.

In Asheville, the public library closed on September 3 and was draped in black. That same day, the Buncombe County Board of Commissioners passed resolutions in Pack's memory and then adjourned out of respect. The local courts also adjourned in his honor. A memorial service was held in the Buncombe County courthouse on September 4 and the city's businesses closed for an hour so all residents could attend. Speakers in Asheville included U.S. Circuit Judge J. C. Pritchard and North Carolina State Representative Locke Craig, who became governor of North Carolina in 1913. Craig read a resolution that noted, "He was the most generous citizen that Asheville ever had."

== Legacy and honors ==
In 1904, Pack's portrait was commissioned for the Buncombe County Courthouse in Asheville. The portrait cost $150 ($5,249 in 2022 money) and was funded by donations from the public. Locke Craig spoke at the portrait's installation, praising Pack's generous giving.

In August 1912, a bronze memorial tablet was installed in the Pack Memorial Public Library in his honor; the 5 by 3 feet (1.52 by 0.91 m) tablet was made by Gorham silversmiths of New York City. Another portrait of Pack was unveiled in the library on April 2, 1915. In 1960, the Asheville Citizen-Times called him "Asheville's greatest benefactor."

Pack Square now consists of 6 acres (2.4 ha) and is part of the Downtown Asheville Historic District. Within that district is the Pack Memorial Library, housed in a modern building several blocks away from the property donated by Pack. Pack's Montford development is listed on the National Register of Historic Places as the Montford Area Historic District. Aston, Magnolia, and Montford Parks still exist as part of the city's public park system.

Pack named what became the community of Bad Axe, Michigan, the county seat of Huron County.

Pack's son, Charles Lathrop Pack became a noted forester and conservationist, along with his son, Randolph Greene Pack. In 1930, Charles Pack established the George Willis Pack Forestry Foundation with an initial gift of $200,000 ($3,764,542 in 2022 money) to support the George Willis Pack Professor of Forest Land Management at the University of Michigan.
