= Antrim, Ohio =

Unincorporated community in Ohio, U.S.

Coordinates: 40°7′14″N 81°21′32″W

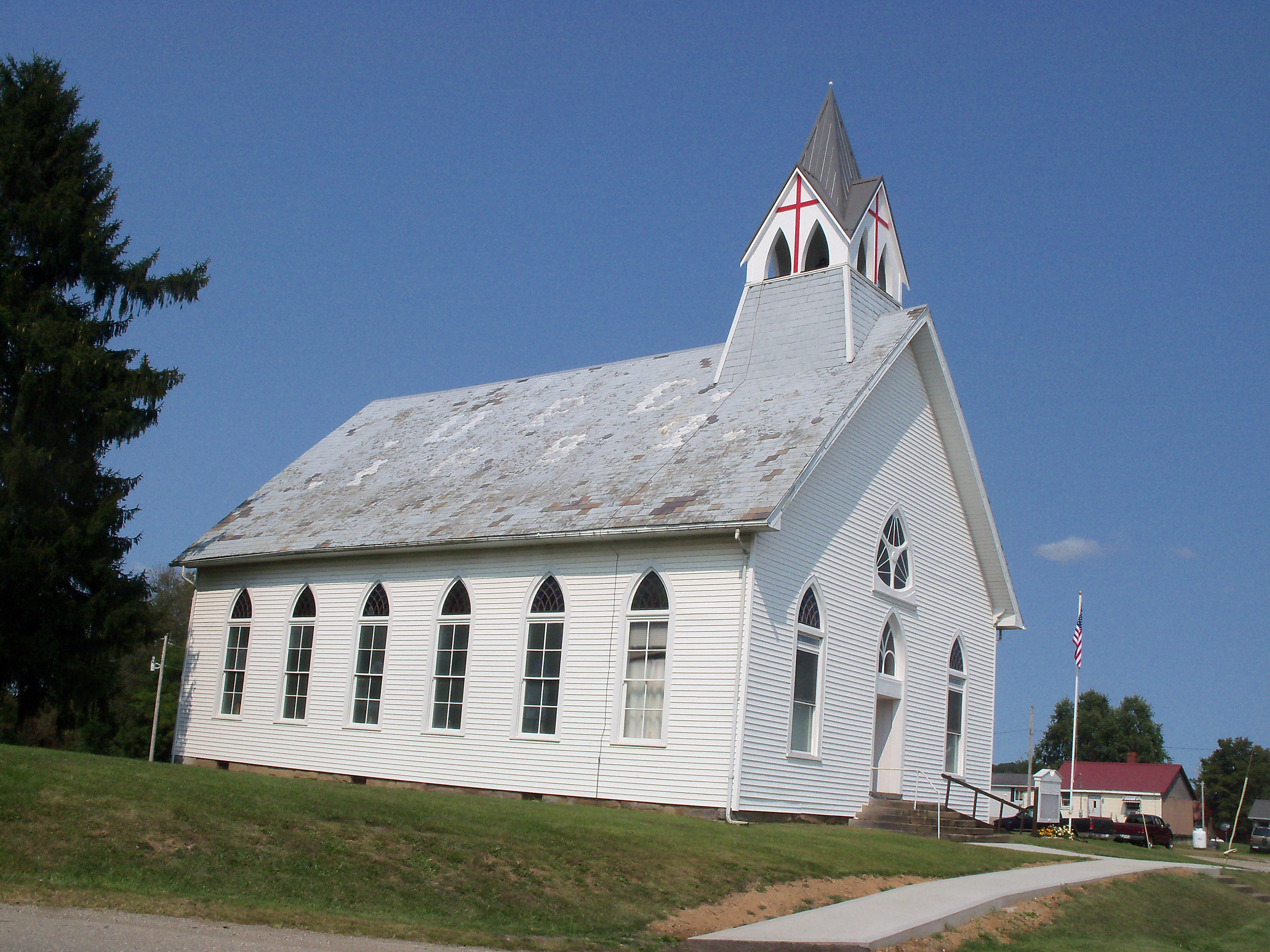
Antrim Presbyterian Church

Antrim is an unincorporated community in Guernsey County, in the U.S. state of Ohio.

== History ==
Antrim was laid out in 1830. The community was named after County Antrim, now in Northern Ireland, the ancestral home of a share of the first settlers. A post office was established at Antrim in 1830, and remained in operation until 1957.

Antrim was the home of Madison College, founded by Samuel Findley in 1835. Madison admitted both men and women at a time when this was unusual, and was well-respected for its academic offerings. The college closed after the Civil War, though the community tried multiple times to re-establish it. Madison College's charter was absorbed by its sister school Muskingum College, in neighboring Muskingum County.

In 1890, the Antrim Presbyterian Church opened which remains to this day. There is also another church called the Antrim United Methodist Church. Antrim also has had a volunteer fire department since 1948 which servers over 180 sq miles.
