= Foster Alexander Sondley =

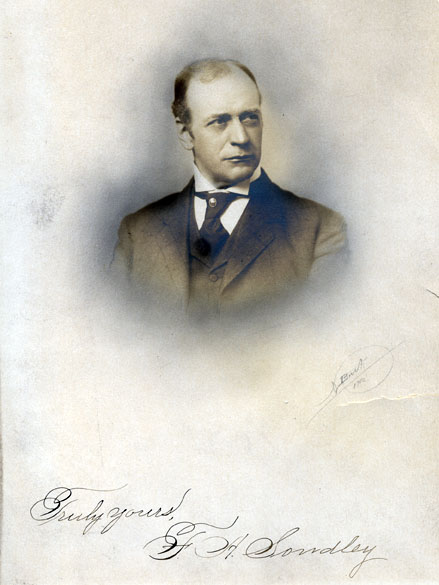
- Born: August 13, 1857; Alexander, North Carolina, US
- Died: April 17, 1931 (aged 73)
- Burial place: Alexander Chapel United Methodist Church Cemetery, Asheville, North Carolina
- Other name: Forster Alexander Sondley
- Education: Wofford College

Foster Alexander Sondley (August 13, 1857 – April 17, 1931), also known as Forster Alexander Sondley or F. A. Sondley, was an attorney, historian, and collector based in Asheville, the urban center of Buncombe County, North Carolina. He is best known for his two-volume A History of Buncombe County, North Carolina (1930).

== Biography ==
=== Family history ===
Foster Alexander Sondley was born to parents Harriet Alexander Ray and her second husband, Richard Sondley II. Harriet was the daughter of James Mitchell Alexander and Nancy Foster and the widow of Elisha Ray, with whom she had five children. She married Richard Sondley in 1855. F.A. Sondley was their only son together.

=== Education and career ===
After attending schools in the Asheville region, F.A. Sondley enrolled in Wofford College in Spartanburg, South Carolina as a sophomore in 1873 and graduated in 1876. After graduating he returned to Asheville, where he would spend the rest of his life.

He was admitted to the bar by the North Carolina Supreme Court in 1879, and developed a reputable career as a lawyer over the next quarter century. He chose to partially retire in 1905 in order to devote time to interests such as historical research and collecting.

He became a member of the first North Carolina Historical Commission established by the NC General Assembly in 1903, and organized and headed the Buncombe County Historical Society. In 1927 the Buncombe County Board of Education bestowed upon Sondley the title "Historian of Buncombe County."

As a historian, Sondley championed research into the history of North Carolina and particularly the western region in which he was based, producing detailed and lengthy histories of Asheville and Buncombe County. A "defender of the Confederacy," he espoused white supremacist and Lost Cause ideology in his writings on Native Americans, slavery, the Civil War, and Reconstruction.

=== Finis Viae ===
After his mother's death in 1897 Sondley constructed a new home, which he called Finis Viae ("end of the road").The building afforded him space to amass a large collection of books, artifacts, and geological specimens pertaining to North Carolina's history.

In 1951 the site of Finis Viae was recognized by a North Carolina Highway Historical Marker located at the intersection of Tunnel Road (U.S. 70) and Beverly Road. It was later incorporated into a housing development at the end of New Haw Creek Road in Asheville.

=== Death ===
Sondley died at Finis Viae on April 17, 1931 following complications from pneumonia.

== Sondley Collection ==
Sondley's collection, including personal papers; collections of coins, firearms, and Native American artifacts; and approximately 30,000-50,000 volumes of books (sources vary) was bequeathed to the City of Asheville in 1931. It formed the beginnings of the Sondley Reference Library, now part of Buncombe County Special Collections as Pack Memorial Library.

Sondley's will stipulated several requirements and restrictions, including limiting access to the reference library to "well conducted white people," a segregationist policy that was debated and upheld for decades until the Asheville-Buncombe Library System desegregated in 1960. Staffing to catalog, preserve, conserve, and provide access to the collection posed a major challenge for the municipal library for decades. In 1980, Buncombe County took over operation of the public library system from the City of Asheville, and the Library Board of Trustees began efforts to gain legal approval to sell portions of the collection deemed irrelevant to the public library’s mission. In 1987, approximately 20,000-25,000 volumes were sold to Chapel Hill Rare Books for a lump sum of $375,000. The library retained non-duplicate books, maps, and artifacts pertaining to North Carolina history. Proceeds from the sale were used to set up a trust fund "to maintain and preserve the materials from Sondley’s original collection, as well as acquire additional materials," but legal complications have prevented the public library system from accessing the funds.

== Published works ==
- Alexander-Davidson reunion, Swannanoa, N. C., August 26, 1911, [Asheville?] : [publisher not identified], [1911?]
- Descent of the Scottish Alexanders; a genealogical sketch, with discussions of some historic matters and with several rare tables, [Asheville, N. C. : Hackney and Moale Co., c1912]
- Samuel Davidson, [Asheville, N.C.] : [publisher not identified], [1913]
- The Indian's curse: a legend of the Cherokees, [Asheville, N.C.?] : [publisher not identified], [1915?]
- The origin of the Catawba grape: and other sketches, Asheville, N.C. : [publisher not identified], 1918.
- The Hickory-nut Gorge, [Asheville, N.C.?] : [publisher not identified], [1920?]
- Early settlement of Western North Carolina, Asheville, N.C. : [publisher not identified], 1921.
- Asheville and Buncombe County, Asheville : The Citizen Co., 1922
- A history of Buncombe County, North Carolina, Asheville, N.C. : Advocate printing co., 1930.
- My ancestry, Asheville, N.C. : Printed by the Inland Press, [1930]
