= Pack Memorial Library =

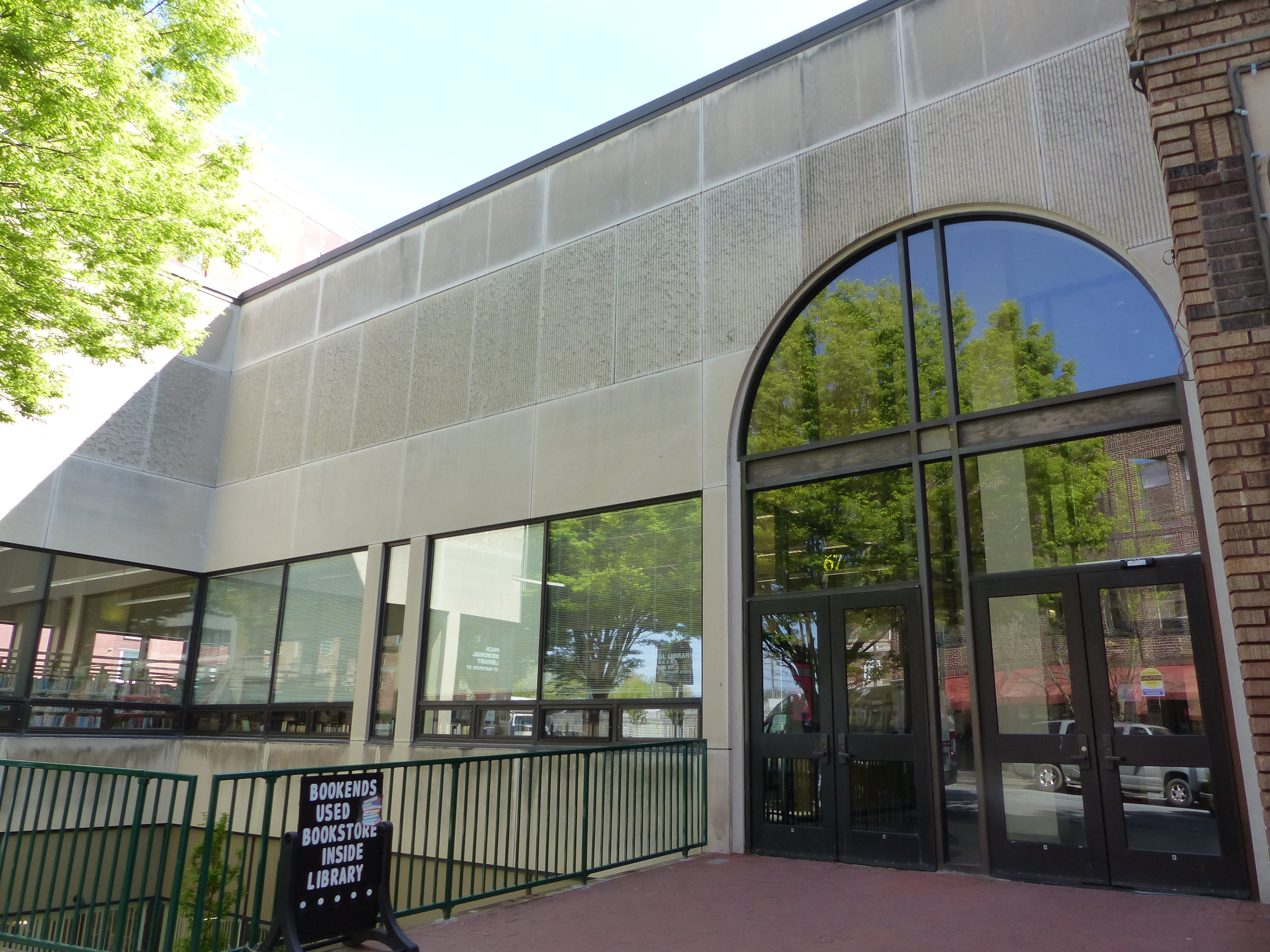
- Pack Memorial Library
- 35.5968375596969°N 82.55479887728626°W
- Location: Asheville, North Carolina, United States
- Type: Public library

Other information
- Parent organization: Buncombe County Public Library System
- Website: www.buncombecounty.org/governing/depts/library/branch-locations/pack-memorial.aspx

Pack Memorial Library is a public library located in downtown Asheville, North Carolina. It is the main branch of the Buncombe County Public Library System.

== Location ==
Pack Memorial Library is located at 67 Haywood Street, Asheville, NC 28801.

== History ==
Members of the Asheville Reading Club, including Anna C. Aston, Fannie Patton and Annie Chunn, began collecting books for a library in 1876. The Asheville Reading Club established the Asheville Library Association on January 25, 1879, and began operating a subscription library.

In March 1894, the library moved to a new location at the corner of Church and Aston Streets; the collection contained 2,000 books and had a yearly subscription fee of $2.00. In 1899, George Willis Pack, a prominent local benefactor, donated a building to the Asheville Library Board to house the Asheville Public Library. The library was later renamed Pack Memorial Library in honor of its benefactor.

On January 2, 1919, the library ended its subscription service and became a free public library. The original Pack building was replaced by a new building designed by Edward Tilton, which opened on July 9, 1926. The collection contained 18,500 volumes. The Tilton building is now home to the Asheville Art Museum.

The library began a bookmobile service in June 1939 to reach rural areas of the county. The bookmobile operated for 66 years before being decommissioned.

The library system desegregated on September 29, 1961.

The library moved to its current location on Haywood Street on November 18, 1978; the building was designed by Bertram King.

== Services ==
Pack Memorial Library contains 150,000 items including books, periodicals, CDs, DVDs, and research materials. The library offers internet access, free Wi-Fi, word processing, and photocopy services.

Pack Memorial Library is also home to the Bookends Used Book Store, Lord Auditorium, and Buncombe County Special Collections (formerly known as the North Carolina Room).

== Buncombe County Special Collections ==
The Buncombe County Special Collections Library is a medium-sized archival facility located on the lower level of Pack Memorial Library. It contains a special collection of photographs, manuscripts, postcards, architectural drawings, maps and other materials related to the history of Asheville, Buncombe County, and Western North Carolina. Much of the collection is attributed to the private collection of Foster Alexander Sondley. Sondley bequeathed his large collection of North Caroliniana containing over 33,000 books, maps, pamphlets, Native American artifacts, gems, and birds' nests to the city of Asheville in 1943.

This collection, originally known as the Sondley Reference Library, officially merged with Pack Memorial Library in 1953. As the collection grew to encompass materials beyond the original Sondley bequest it became known as the North Carolina Collection, then the North Carolina Room when it moved into a dedicated space on the lower level of Pack Memorial Library in 2009. In 2020, it was renamed Buncombe County Special Collections.

The Buncombe County Special Collections Library is also home to the Thomas Wolfe Collection, curated by Myra Champion in 1949. It contains first-edition books, book reviews, articles, photos, correspondence, family recordings, and newspaper clippings all related to Asheville-born author Thomas Wolfe.
