= Randolph Greene Pack =

American philanthropist

- Born: June 8, 1890; Cleveland, Ohio
- Died: December 25, 1956 (aged 66); Greenwich, Connecticut
- Occupation: Philanthropist
- Spouses: Georgia Fuller; Maxine Wells
- Children: Alice Gertrude Pack; Virginia Lathrop Pack; Joan Pack; Polly Pack
- Parent(s): Charles Lathrop Pack; Alice Gertrude Hatch

Randolph Greene Pack (June 8, 1890 in Cleveland, Ohio – December 25, 1956 in Greenwich, Connecticut), was an American philanthropist.

== Early life and education ==
Randolph Greene Pack, son of Charles Lathrop Pack, grew up in Cleveland, Ohio, at the turn of the century. He attended the college preparatory Ransom School, followed by stints at Williams College (class of 1913) and Penn State, the latter in a forestry program.

== Early career ==
Under his father's tutelage, Randolph began preparing for a career in forestry. While a student at Penn State, he spent one summer working "as a Montana logger". Not long afterward, in 1912, at "a mere twenty-two years old, he became vice president of ... the Tall Tree Lumber Company", just established in southern Arkansas by William Buchanan in partnership with Charles Lathrop Pack. Two years later, Randolph returned to Cleveland long enough to marry Georgia Fuller; the newlyweds set up residence in Good Pine, Louisiana. After a bout with malaria, in 1916 Randolph and his wife returned to Cleveland, where, for the next seven years, he was "vice president in charge of engineering" with the American Multigraph Company, owned by Harry C. Osborne, a friend of his father's.

== Pack Forestry Foundation ==
Randolph was an officer of the Charles Lathrop Pack Forestry Foundation from 1931–1956, serving as president from 1937, upon his father's death. According to his father's biographer, Alexandra Eyle, Randolph "had developed a deep interest in world politics and economics. Through the foundation, he could launch forestry management programs in Asia, [Central] and South America."

Through the Pack Foundation, Randolph "became a founder of the Mexican Institute of Renewable Natural Resources" (Instituto Mexicano de Recursos Naturales Renovables, or IMERNAR), headed by Enrique Beltrán, who received a Guggenheim Fellowship in 1932 for his conservation efforts. IMERNAR was one of the first environmental non-governmental organizations (ENGOs) in Mexico.

Eyle suggests, as well, that Randolph Greene Pack "helped create the United Nations Food and Agriculture Organization."

A further arena of Pack's contributions to international forestry was in helping rebuild the forest resources of Japan and Taiwan, following World War II. Through the Pack Foundation, he helped the US Department of Defense formulate a new forestry law for Japan, to encourage rebuilding of that country's devastated forestry sector; and the US Department of State in strengthening forest policy in Taiwan.

Pack worked closely in the Foundation with Tom Gill, secretary of the Foundation, and international forester. Together, they contributed to the establishment of forest education and forest policy also in Venezuela and the Philippines.

== Death ==
Randolph Greene Pack "died in 1956, at the age of sixty-six, after suffering for several months of a brain tumor".

=== Legacy ===
The Randolph G. Pack Environmental Institute at the State University of New York College of Environmental Science and Forestry was established in 1995, through a bequest of Pack's daughter, Virginia Pack Townsend. Honoring Pack and his efforts in international forest policy and conservation, the Institute aims to support and strengthen scholarship and collaboration in international environmental, natural resource and conservation policy.

== Recognition ==
=== Offices ===
- President, American Tree Association
- Vice President, American Nature Association
- Executive vice president and director, American Forestry Association
- Director, Northeastern Forestry Foundation

=== Service ===
- Member, United States Citizens Committee, United Nations Scientific Conference on Conservation and Utilization of Resources, Lake Success, New York, August 17, 1949—appointed by Julius A. Krug, U.S. Secretary of the Interior. The gathering was "the first UN body to address the depletion of [natural] resources and their use".
- Member, Boy Scouts of America conservation committee

=== Honors ===
- Honorary member, Mexican Society of Nature Protection
- Honorary member, Society of American Foresters, 1945
- Honorary Doctor of Science degree, University of Michigan, 1953, "in recognition of his conservation and land management work"
