= American Nature Association =

Publisher of Nature Magazine (1923–1959)

Nature Magazine
- Categories: Natural history
- Frequency: Monthly
- Based in: Baltimore, Maryland
- OCLC: 1681047

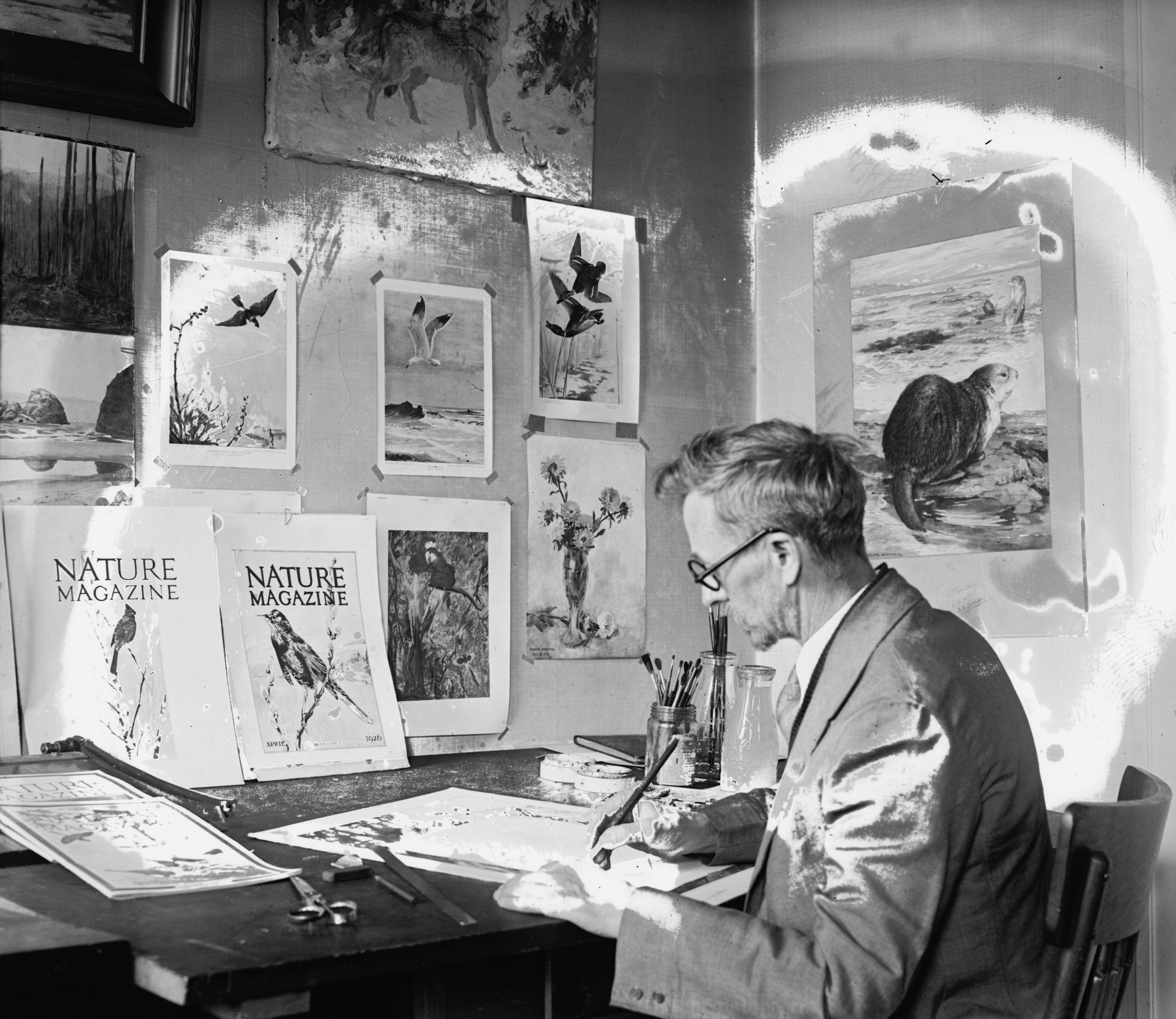
R. Bruce Horsfall, Artist of Nature magazine (cover art is on his desk) on March 16, 1926

American Nature Association, headquartered in Washington, D.C., was the publisher of Nature Magazine from 1923 to 1959; and a discount reseller of natural science books for its members. It was founded by Arthur Newton Pack and his father, Charles. Nature Magazine was an "illustrated monthly with popular articles about nature" and later, the "interpreter of the great outdoors." A May 1924 review of the organization and its magazine, written by Carroll Lane Fenton and published in American Midland Naturalist called the magazine "excellent" with "abundant pictures, admirably printed"; and said it was a "highly worth while publication" that deserves a wide circulation among town and school libraries."

Natural History magazine absorbed Nature Magazine in January 1960.
