= George T. Pack =

American surgeon (1898–1969)

- Born: May 14, 1898; Antrim, Ohio, U.S.
- Died: January 23, 1969 (aged 70); New York, U.S.
- Education: Yale University; Memorial Sloan Kettering Cancer Center; Curie Foundation Institute of Radium
- Occupation: Surgeon
- Known for: Physician of Eva Peron
- Honours: American Cancer Society Honorary Life Director

George T. Pack (May 14, 1898 – January 23, 1969) was an American surgeon who specialized in the treatment of patients with cancer.

== Biography ==
Pack was born on a farm in Antrim, Ohio. When he gave a lecture as a graduate student at Ohio State University, Dr. Winternitz of Yale University invited him to continue lecturing at the Yale Department of Pathology only to learn after his arrival that he was not even a medical student. He enrolled at Yale and graduated with a medical degree in 1922. In 1925 he became Professor of Pathology at the University of Alabama School of Medicine. In 1926 he went to New York to start as an intern at Memorial Cancer Center. During his further training he spent time at the Curie Foundation Institute of Radium in Paris. From 1928 to 1931 he was a Resident Surgeon at Memorial Hospital. He subsequently became the Chief of the Gastric and Mixed Tumor Services at Memorial Cancer Center where he developed an oncologic service that combined the use of surgery, radiation therapy and chemotherapy tailored to the need of each patient. He founded the Pack Medical Group that at the time of his death had treated about 81,000 patients, most of them with cancer.

In 1951 Juan Perón consulted Pack concerning the cancer of his wife, Eva Perón. Secretly Pack was flown into Argentina to operate on her; she was unaware of his presence at surgery and the diagnosis and died the following year.

Pack who grew up on a farm maintained a lifelong affinity to farming. As an owner of 20 farms he contributed to veterinary journals and raised prize-winning cattle.

Toward the end of his life Pack suffered from cerebral arteriosclerosis. Unable to operate due to strokes he still attended surgery in an advisory function. Pack died at Memorial Hospital in New York on January 23, 1969.

Pack was widely recognized for his achievements in oncology and was considered one of the top cancer specialists at his time. He had honorary degrees and professorships from 15 universities, had many publications and acolytes, and was on the editorial board of seven medical journals. The American Cancer Society made him an Honorary Life Director and presented him with the Special Citation award in 1967.
