= Charles Lathrop Pack =

American timberman (1857–1937)

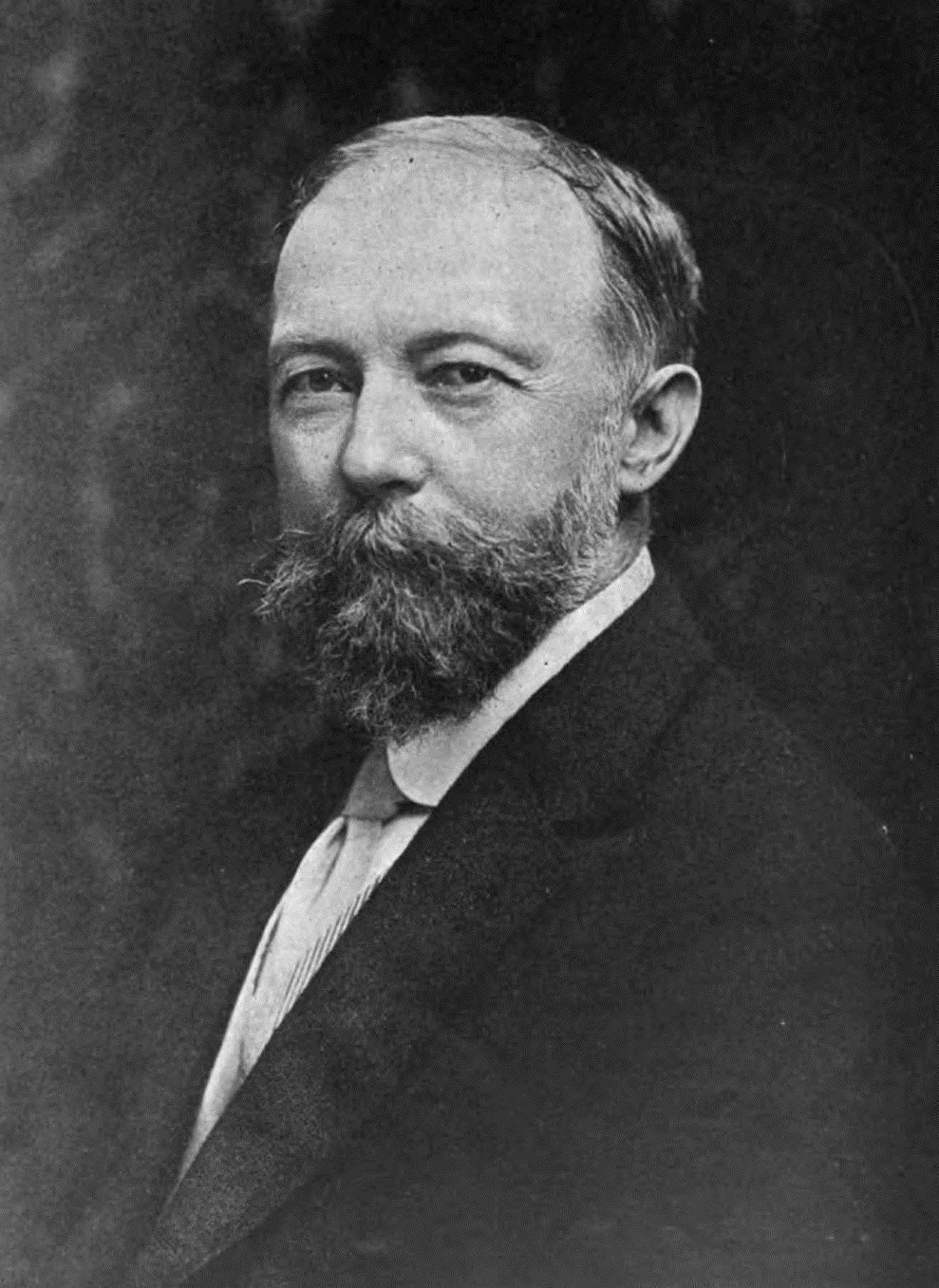
- Portrait of Charles Lathrop Pack
- Born: May 7, 1857; Lexington, Michigan, US
- Died: June 14, 1937 (aged 80); New York City, US
- Education: Brooks Military Academy, Cleveland, Ohio
- Occupation(s): Businessman, philanthropist
- Spouse: Alice Gertrude Hatch
- Children: George Lathrop Pack; Randolph Greene Pack; Arthur Newton Pack; Beulah Frances Pack
- Parent(s): George Willis Pack; Frances Farman

Charles Lathrop Pack (May 7, 1857 – June 14, 1937), a third-generation timberman, was "one of the five wealthiest men in America prior to World War I".

His financial success was built on the success of his father, George Willis Pack, and grandfather, George Pack, Jr. in the forestry sector. Growing up on the shores of Lake Huron in Michigan's Lower Peninsula, Charles L. Pack lived in Cleveland, Ohio, from 1871 until the early years of the 20th century. With investments in timber in the American South, banking and real estate, Pack became a multi-millionaire. During World War I, he was a principal organizer and was heavily involved in the war garden movement in the United States.

During the 1930s, he was the president of The American Tree Association.

== Victory Gardens ==
In March 1917, Charles Lathrop Pack organized the US National War Garden Commission and launched the war garden campaign. After the war, he documented the victory garden movement in The War Garden Victorious.

== Philately ==
Pack was a philatelist, recognized for his award-winning collections of postage stamps.

=== Collecting interests ===
Pack was noted for his collections of postage stamps of New South Wales, New Zealand, Canada, Cape of Good Hope, Spain, Argentina, Uruguay and Brazil. He was especially noted for his plating of early stamps of Brazil and the plating of the Uruguay 1856 'Diligencia' issue.

=== Philatelic literature ===
Pack's collection of postage stamps of Victoria led to his publication in 1923 of his famous book Victoria: the Half-length Portraits and the Twopence Queen Enthroned.

=== Honors and awards ===
Pack received worldwide recognition and numerous awards. He signed the Roll of Distinguished Philatelists in 1921. He was the first American to receive the Crawford Medal in 1923 from the Royal Philatelic Society London. He was also the first American to receive the Lindenberg Medal in 1926 from the Berliner Philatelisten-Klub and the first person to receive the Award of Merit from the Collectors Club of New York. Pack is named in the American Philatelic Society Hall of Fame for 1941.

== Philanthropy ==
According to his biographer, Alexandra Eyle, Charles Lathrop Pack "spent $2.8 million on forestry conservation. This is a low figure, however..."

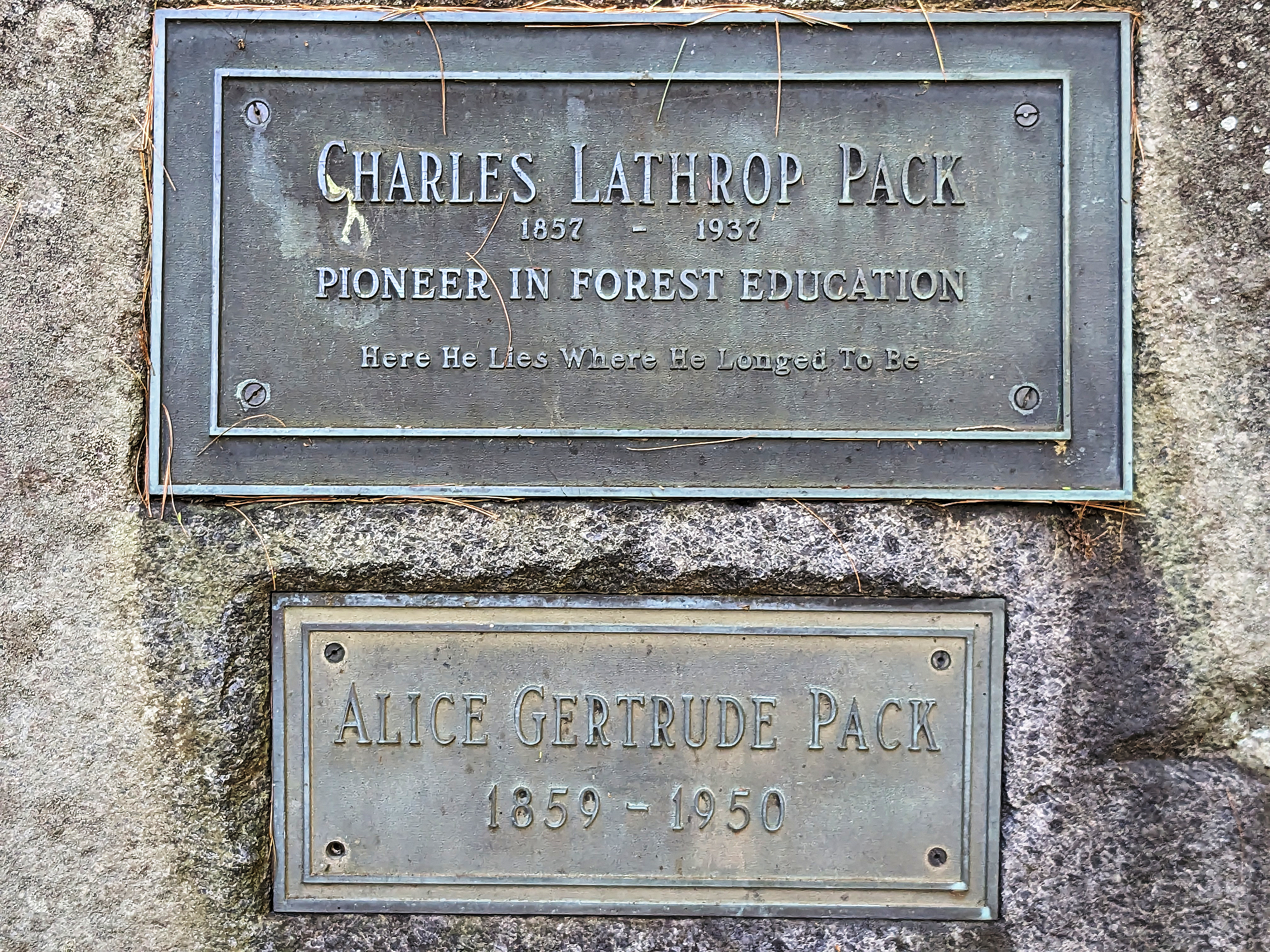
Gravestone of Charles Lathrop Pack (GPS 43.550305, -73.808994)

== Death ==
Pack's remains were buried in 1937 "under a stand of white pine in the Charles Lathrop Pack Demonstration Forest in Warrensburg, New York... a site of his own choosing".

== Publications ==
- Pack, Charles Lathrop (1919). The war garden victorious. Philadelphia, Press of J. B. Lippincott & Co. OCLC 425762.
- Pack, Charles Lathrop. 1922. "The School Book of Forestry".
- Pack, Charles Lathrop. 1923. Victoria: the Half-length Portraits and the Twopence Queen Enthroned
- Pack, Charles Lathrop. 1926. The forestry primer, 1876 - 1926. The American Tree Association (January 1, 1926).

== See also ==
- Euclid Avenue (Cleveland)
- Victory garden
- Philatelic literature
- Wellington R. Burt
