= John Pack =

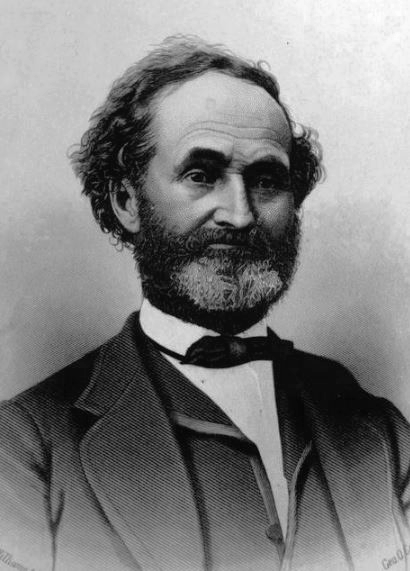
Photograph of John Pack, approximately 1860

John Pack (May 20, 1809 – April 4, 1885) was a member of the Council of Fifty and a missionary in the early days of the Church of Jesus Christ of Latter-day Saints (LDS Church).

== Biography ==
Pack was born in Saint John, New Brunswick. He married his first wife, Julia Ives, in 1832 in Watertown, New York. In 1836, Pack was baptized a member of the Church of the Latter Day Saints.

Pack moved to Kirtland, Ohio, then to Missouri, and then to Nauvoo, Illinois. He was a member of the Nauvoo Legion, holding the rank of captain. Pack also served as a policeman in Nauvoo. In addition, Pack was one of the four music wardens of the University of Nauvoo, working under the department head, Gustavus Hill. The program was a broad one and Pack instructed in instrumental music along with Titus Billings while Benjamin Wilder and Stephen Goddard were over vocal music department and directed the community choir.

Pack was in the first company of Mormon pioneers to cross the plains with Brigham Young. He held the ranks of Captain of Fifty in the company as well as Colonel in its military organization. At the time of Joseph Smith's death, Pack was serving as a missionary in New Jersey with Ezra T. Benson. After Smith's death, Pack remained active in the Church of Jesus Christ of Latter-day Saints (LDS Church) and became a member of the Council of Fifty in 1845.

The University of Deseret, the predecessor of the University of Utah, began in the home of John Pack.

Pack served with John Taylor as one of the first LDS Church missionaries in France beginning in 1849. Pack was in this mission until 1852, but he spent most of his time preaching in the Channel Islands.

In 1860, Pack and his eldest son, Ward E. Pack, built the first sawmill in Kamas, Utah Territory.

== Wives of John Pack ==
- Married his first wife Julia Ives on October 10, 1832 in Watertown, New York
- Married his second wife Ruth Mosher in March 1845 in Nauvoo, Illinois
- Married his third wife Nancy Aurelia Boothe on January 21, 1846 in Nauvoo, Illinois
- Married his fourth wife Eliza Jane Graham on October 14, 1849 in Nauvoo, Illinois
- Married his fifth wife Mary Jane Walker on September 15, 1852 in Salt Lake City, Utah
- Married his sixth wife Jessie Bell Stirling on January 16, 1864 in Salt Lake City, Utah
- Married his seventh wife Lucy Jane Giles on May 2, 1865 in Salt Lake City, Utah
- Married his eighth wife Jane Robison on July 20, 1870

== Descendants ==
Ward Eaton Pack, one of Pack's sons, twice served as president of the Hawaiian Mission of the LDS Church. He also served in the presidency of the Cache Stake, which covered all of Cache County, Utah and into Wyoming at the time. Ward Eaton's daughter, Grace, married Charles A. Callis, who was later a member of the Quorum of the Twelve Apostles of the LDS Church.

Another one of John Pack's sons, Frederick J. Pack, was a prominent professor at the University of Utah.

F. Burton Howard, a general authority of the LDS Church, is a descendant of John Pack and Mary Jane Walker, through their daughter Hattie Pack (married Howard) and grandson Fred Pack Howard.

=== The John Pack Family Association ===
The John Pack Family Association (founded in the 1950s) holds yearly John Pack descendant family reunions, typically at This Is the Place Heritage Park near the end of the summer. They also contributed to build a replica of the John Pack home at This Is the Place Heritage Park.
