= Big Powderhorn Mountain =

Ski area in Michigan, United States

Coordinates: 46°30′15″N 90°05′46″W

- Interactive map of Big Powderhorn Mountain
- Location: Bessemer Township, Michigan
- Skiable area: 253 acres (102 ha)
- Trails: 45
- Lift system: 10
- Terrain parks: Yes
- Snowmaking: Yes
- Night skiing: No
- Website: https://bigpowderhorn.net/

Big Powderhorn Mountain is a 250-acre (1.0 km^{2}) ski resort located in Gogebic County in the Upper Peninsula of Michigan, within Bessemer Township and Ironwood Township (between the cities of Bessemer and Ironwood). The mountain is part of the Gogebic Range with a summit of 1,631 ft (497 m) and a base elevation of 1,214 ft (370 m) for a 417 ft (127 m) vertical drop. It offers 9 chairlifts accessing 45 trails for Alpine skiing and Snowboarding on 253 skiable acres, with an even mix of easy, intermediate, and difficult trail ratings and two terrain parks. The Wolverine Nordic Trail also connects to the resort for cross-country skiing.

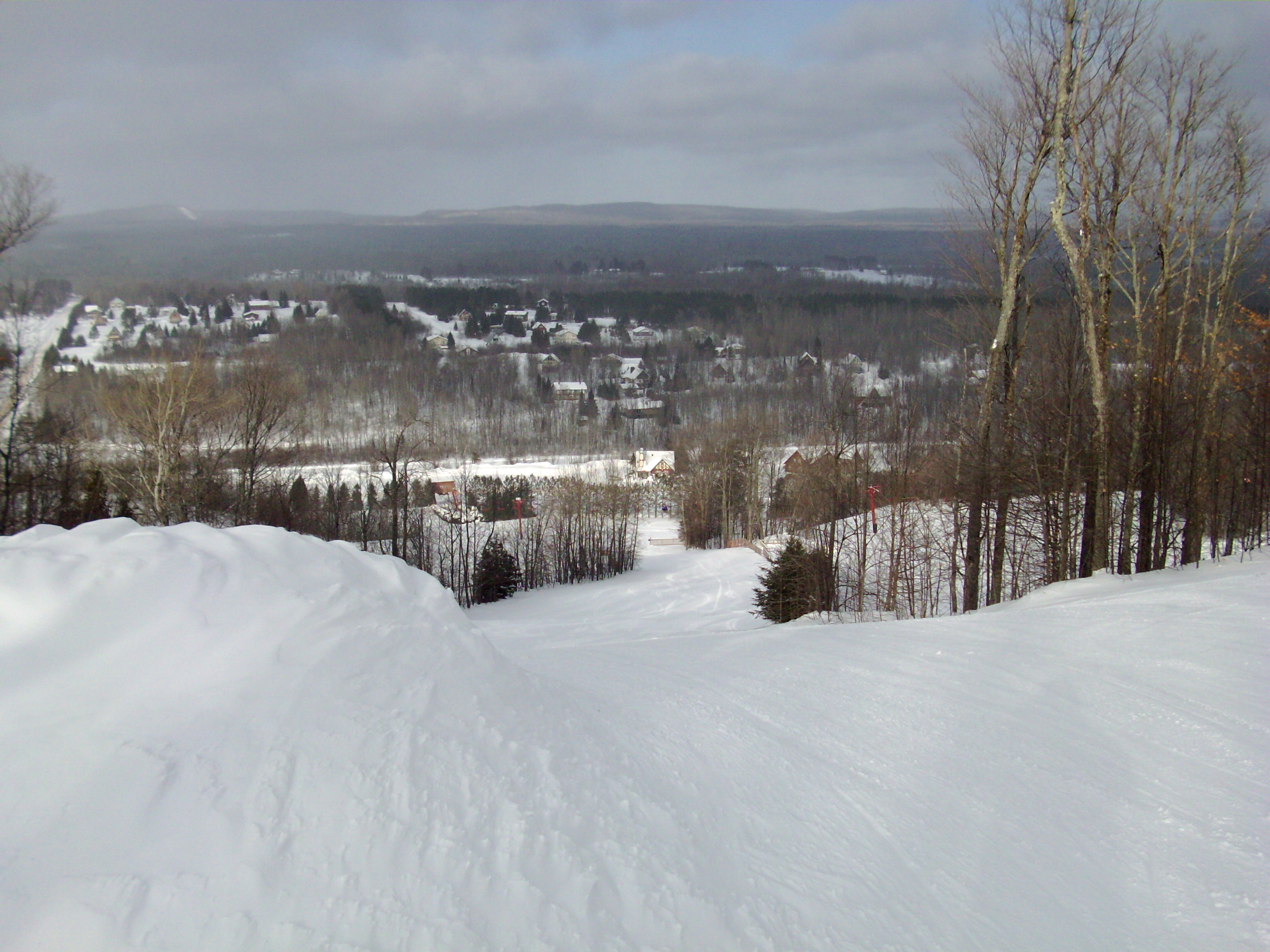
View from Dynamite Trail

== Fire ==
On January 13, 2011, a fire occurred at the main lodge. No injuries were reported, but the building was declared a total loss. Despite the loss of the building, the resort opened the following day, using the nearby Caribou Lodge as a base for skiers.

A brand new lodge was built next to the Caribou Lodge and opened for the 2012 - 2013 Ski Season.

== Ski Lifts ==
Big Powderhorn has 9 Two-Person lifts, all built by Riblet Tramway Company, and a rope tow.

Number	Name	Type of Lift	Manufacturer	Year built
1	Alpen	Double	Riblet	1976
2	Flintlock	Double	Riblet	1993
3	Buckshot	Double	Riblet	1969
4	Bovidae	Double	Riblet	1964
5	Smoke	Double	Riblet	1983
6	Ricochet	Double	Riblet	1964
7	Big Bird	Double	Riblet	1981
8	Tamarou	Double	Riblet	1971
9	Shotgun	Double	Riblet	1987
P	Learning Area	Paddle Tow	—	1999

== Ski Runs ==
As of May 2021, Big Powderhorn has 45 Ski Runs

Run Name	Difficulty
Alpen	Easy
Back Bowl East	Intermediate
Back Bowl West	Easy
Big Bird	Easy
Blunder	Hard
Bovidae	Intermediate
Bovidae West	Intermediate
Buckshot	Easy
Bullet	Hard
Cannonball	Hard
Caribou	Intermediate
Crazy Trail	Intermediate (Glade Skiing)
Crosshair Chute	Hard
Don’t Chute	Hard
Double Barrel West	Hard
Dynamite	Intermediate
Firecracker	Intermediate
Flintlock	Easy
Full Choke Chute	Hard
Glen’s Trail	Hard
Half Choke Chute	Hard
Katie’s Catwalk	Extra Hard
Learning Area	Easy
Little Horn	Intermediate
Louie’s Chute	Hard
Lower Double Barrel	Hard
Lower Smoke	Intermediate
Lower Tamarou	Intermediate
Musket	Intermediate
Oxbow	Easy
Passenthrü	Easy
Powderkeg	Intermediate
Ramrod	Intermediate
Recoil Park	Terrain Park
Reindeer	Easy
Ricochet	Intermediate
Shotgun	Easy
Sling Shot	Intermediate
Sly Fox	Intermediate
Tamarou East	Intermediate
Tamarou West	Intermediate
Thunder	Hard
Trigger	Easy
Upper Double Barrel	Hard
Upper Smoke	Hard
Vertical Drop	Hard

== Websites ==
- Big Powderhorn Mountain Website
- Big Powderhorn Mountain Resort Lodging
- Big Powderhorn Lodging Association
- Big Powderhorn Ski Patrol
- Wolverine Nordic Ski Club
