= Anvil, Michigan =

- Unincorporated community
- Location within the state of Michigan
- Coordinates: 46°28′13″N 90°01′07″W
- Country: United States
- State: Michigan
- County: Gogebic
- Township: Bessemer
- Elevation: 1,601 ft (488 m)
- Time zone: UTC-6 (Central (CST))
  - Summer (DST): UTC-5 (CDT)
- ZIP code(s): 49911 (Bessemer)
- Area code: 906
- GNIS feature ID: 620159

Anvil is an unincorporated community in Gogebic County, Michigan, United States.
