= Erwin Township, Michigan =

- Civil township
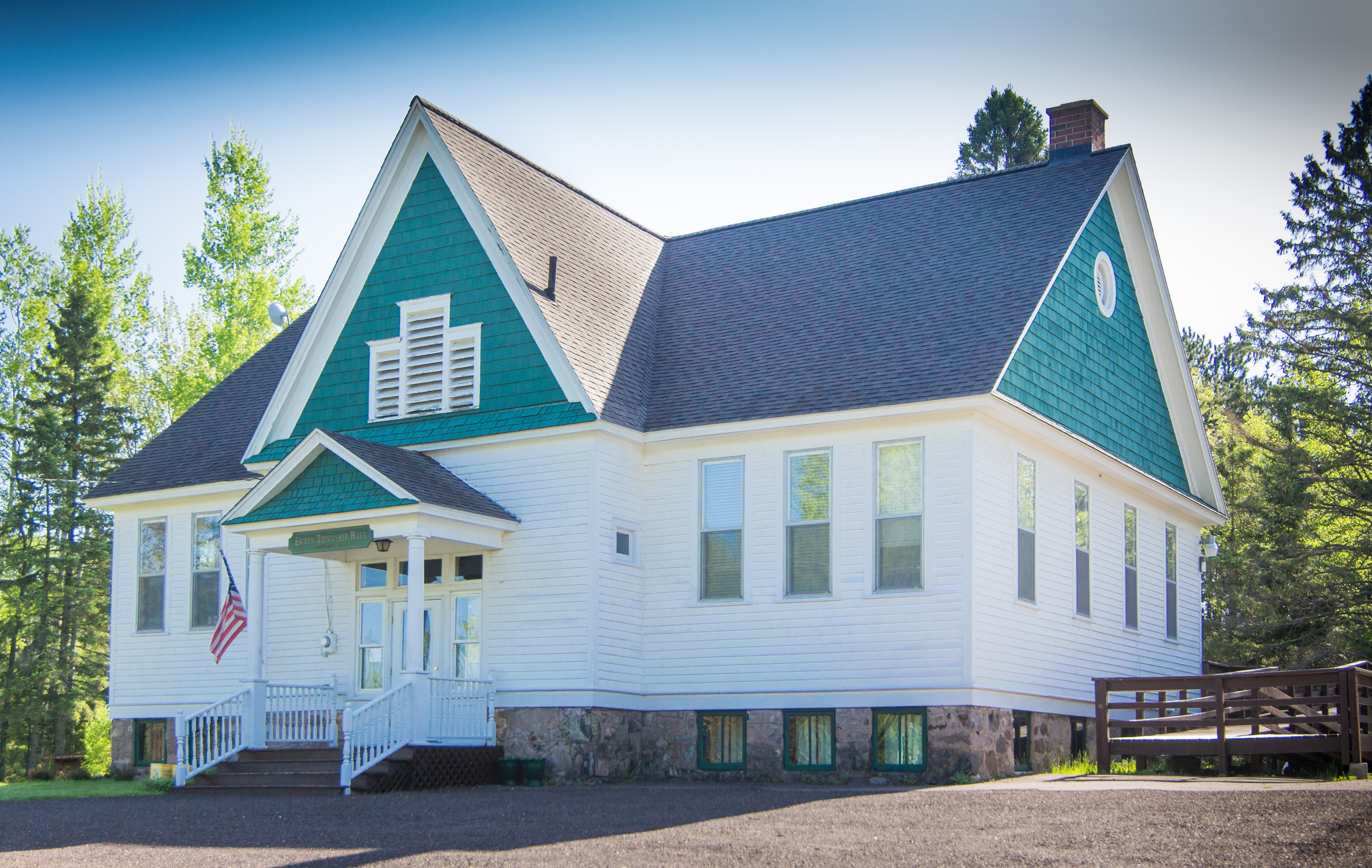
- Town hall

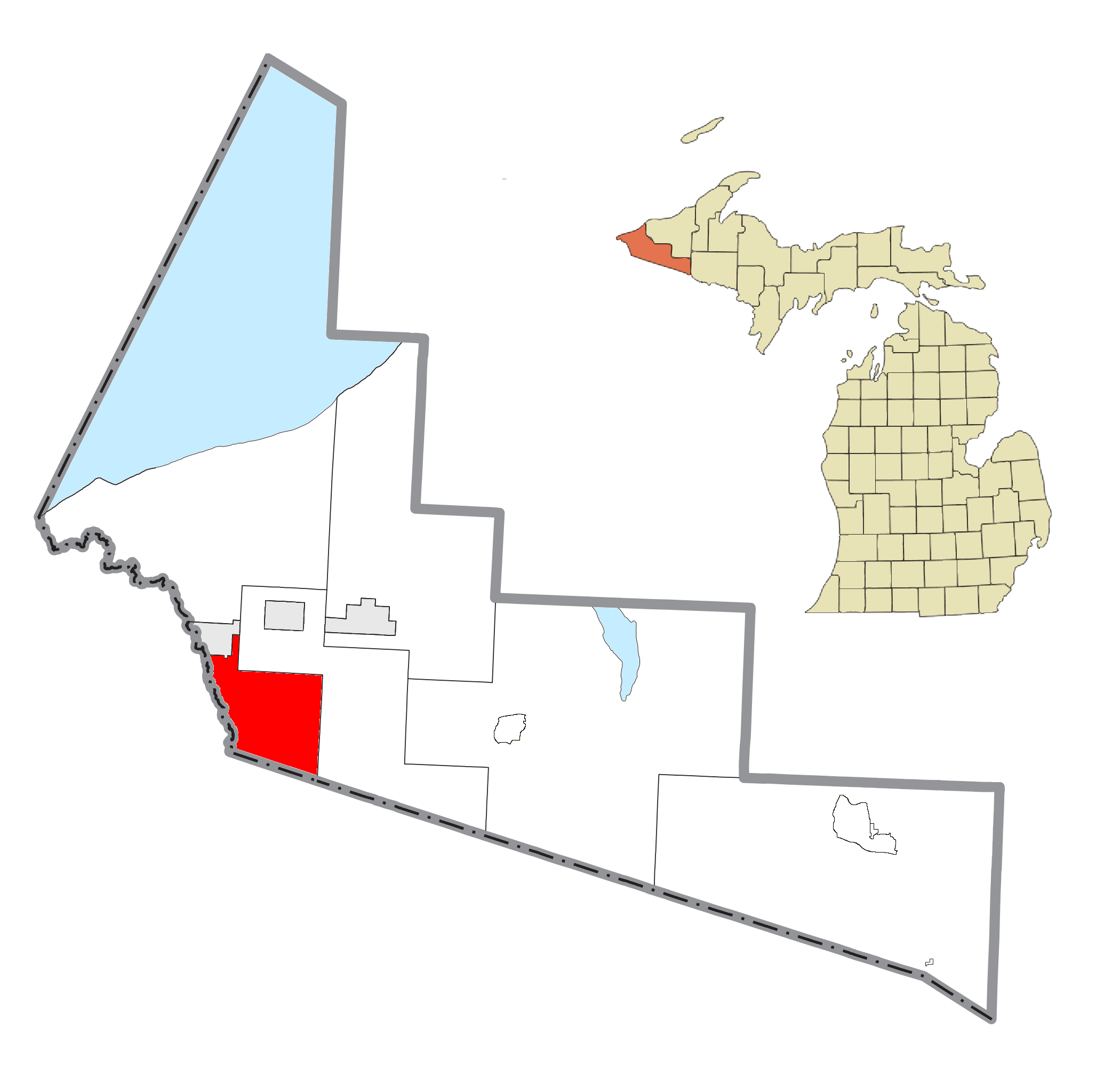
- Location within Gogebic County

- Location within the state of Michigan Erwin Township (the United States)
- Coordinates: 46°23′31″N 90°05′06″W
- Country: United States
- State: Michigan
- County: Gogebic
- Established: 1907

Government
  - Supervisor: Larry Grimsby
  - Clerk: Vicky Finco

Area
  - Total: 48.1 sq mi (124.7 km^{2})
  - Land: 47.2 sq mi (122.3 km^{2})
  - Water: 0.97 sq mi (2.5 km^{2})
- Elevation: 1,529 ft (466 m)

Population (2020)
  - Total: 267
  - Density: 7.5/sq mi (2.9/km^{2})
- Time zone: UTC-6 (Central (CST))
  - Summer (DST): UTC-5 (CDT)
- ZIP code(s): 49911 (Bessemer); 49938 (Ironwood)
- Area code: 906
- FIPS code: 26-26340
- GNIS feature ID: 1626246
- Website: Official website

Erwin Township is a civil township of Gogebic County in the U.S. state of Michigan. The population was 267 in 2020.

The township is just south of Ironwood. The Montreal River is the western boundary, with Wisconsin on the other side and to the south. Bessemer Township is on the east and north.

== Geography ==
According to the United States Census Bureau, the township has a total area of 48.2 square miles (125 km^{2}), of which 47.2 square miles (122 km^{2}) is land and 0.9 square miles (2.3 km^{2}) (1.97%) is water.

== Demographics ==
As of the census of 2000, there were 357 people, 146 households, and 104 families residing in the township. In 2020, there were 267 people residing in the township. As of 2023, the median age in Erwin was 62.6 years.

== Transportation ==
CR 505 (Van Buskirk Road) begins at the Ironwood city limits and runs through the township to terminate at CTH-C on the Wisconsin state line in Oma, Wisconsin.
