= Dunham, Michigan =

- Unincorporated community
- Location within the state of Michigan
- Coordinates: 46°22′58″N 89°46′59″W
- Country: United States
- State: Michigan
- County: Gogebic
- Township: Marenisco
- Elevation: 1,601 ft (488 m)
- Time zone: UTC-6 (Central (CST))
  - Summer (DST): UTC-5 (CDT)
- ZIP code(s): 49947 (Marenisco)
- Area code: 906
- GNIS feature ID: 1619782

Dunham is an unincorporated community in Gogebic County, in the U.S. state of Michigan.

== History ==
A post office was established at Dunham in 1902, and was discontinued in 1911. The community was named for John Dunham, an official with the Ashland and Steel Company which operated in the area.
