= Siemens (disambiguation) =

Siemens is a German engineering and technology conglomerate founded by Werner von Siemens.

Siemens may also refer to:

== People ==
- Siemens (surname), list of people with the German surname
- Siemens family, a family of German inventors, engineers, and industrialists, including:
  - Werner von Siemens (1816–1892), German inventor and founder of Siemens AG
  - Carl Wilhelm Siemens (1823–1883), brother of Werner von Siemens and inventor of the open-hearth furnace

== Places ==
- Siemens, Michigan, a community in the United States

== Companies ==
- Siemens AG, a German multinational corporation founded by the Siemens family.
- Siemens Energy, a German energy company
- Siemens Healthineers, a German medical technology company (75% owned by Siemens AG)
- Siemens & Halske (1847–1966), German electrical engineering company that later became Siemens AG
  - Siemens Brothers (1858–1955), British engineering branch of the company, later sold during World War I
- Siemens-Schuckert (1803–1966), German electrical engineering company incorporated into Siemens AG in 1966
- Siemens Transportation Group, unrelated Canadian transportation company

== Science and technology ==
- Siemens Nexas, a type of metro train that operates in Melbourne, Australia
- siemens (unit), symbol S, the SI derived unit of electrical conductance
- Siemens-Martin process, open hearth furnace process invented by Carl Siemens
- Siemens mercury unit, an obsolete unit of electrical resistance

== See also ==
- List of Siemens products
