= Siemens, Michigan =

- Unincorporated community
- Location within the state of Michigan
- Coordinates: 46°28′30″N 90°06′13″W
- Country: United States
- State: Michigan
- County: Gogebic
- Township: Bessemer
- Time zone: UTC-6 (Central (CST))
  - Summer (DST): UTC-5 (CDT)
- ZIP code(s): 49911 (Bessemer)
- Area code: 906
- GNIS feature ID: 1617851

Siemens is an unincorporated community in Gogebic County, in the U.S. state of Michigan. It is located halfway between Ironwood and Bessemer along U.S. Route 2.

== History ==
The community was named for Werner von Siemens, a German inventor and industrialist.
