= Lake Gogebic State Park =

State park in Gogebic County, Michigan

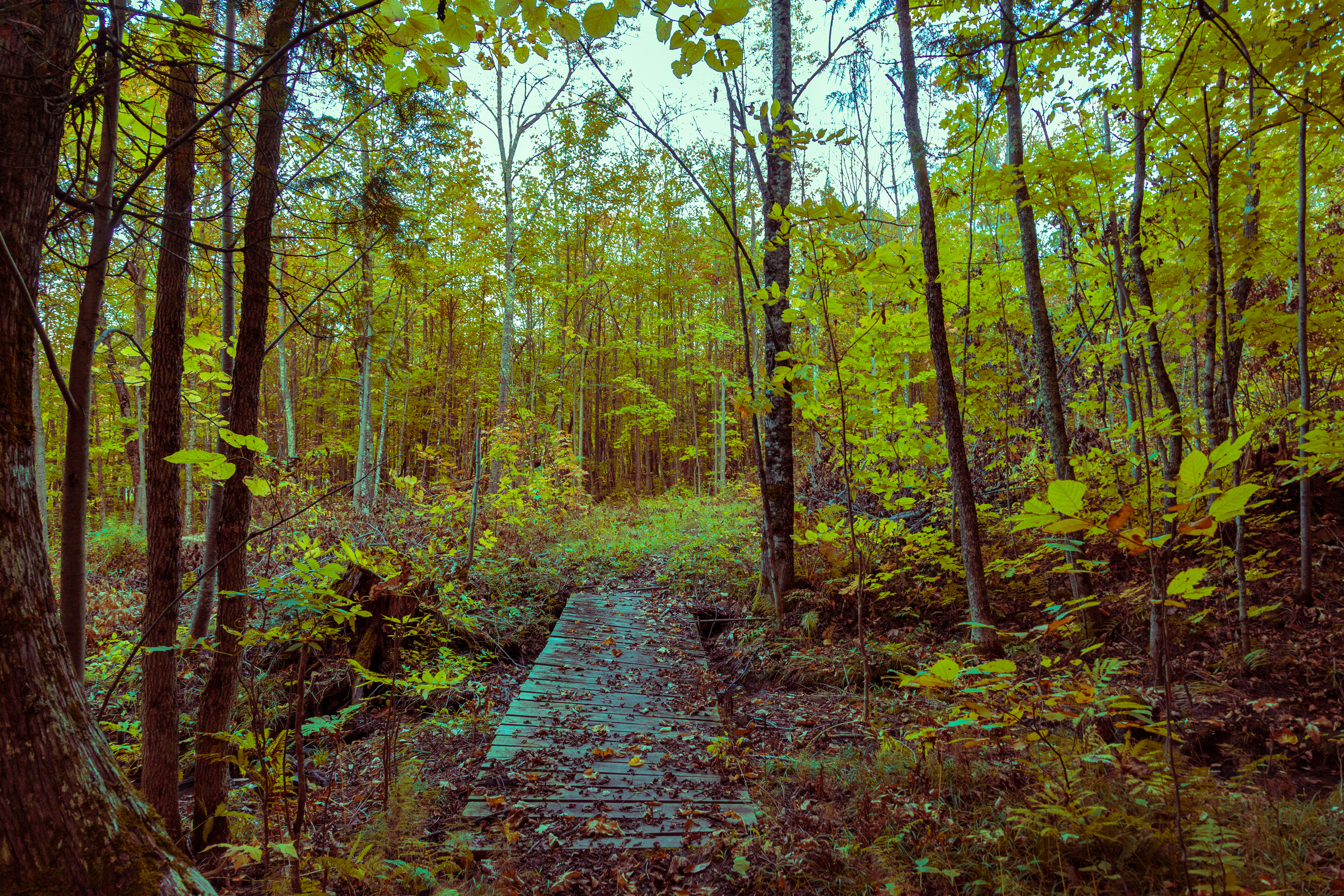

- Location within Michigan Location within the United States
- Location: Upper Peninsula, Gogebic County, Michigan, United States
- Nearest city: Wakefield, Michigan
- Coordinates: 46°27′32″N 89°34′38″W
- Area: 360 acres (150 ha)
- Elevation: 1,296 feet (395 m)
- Established: 1926
- Administrator: Michigan Department of Natural Resources
- Designation: Michigan State Park
- Website: Official website

Lake Gogebic State Park is a public recreation area covering 360 acres (150 ha) in the Upper Peninsula of Michigan. The state park sits on the western shore of Lake Gogebic, the largest inland lake in the Upper Peninsula. The land around the park is sparsely populated, and relatively flat.

== History ==
In 1926, Gogebic County purchased land on Lake Gogebic, which it gave to the State of Michigan. E. J. Stickley and W. Bonafas gave additional land to the state and in 1930 the park opened. Two gravestones discovered in the park in 1962, engraved "1822 JOHN KEY" and "1824 WHITH", are thought by researchers to be those of fur traders or others dealing with Native Americans.

== Activities and amenities ==
The park offers nearly a mile of beach front access, fishing, swimming, boat launch, camping, picnicking, and a 2-mile (3.2 km) nature trail through the Ottawa National Forest.
