= Thayer, Michigan =

- Unincorporated community
- Location within the state of Michigan
- Coordinates: 46°19′45″N 89°27′44″W
- Country: United States
- State: Michigan
- County: Gogebic
- Township: Watersmeet
- Time zone: UTC-6 (Central (CST))
  - Summer (DST): UTC-5 (CDT)
- ZIP code(s): 49969 (Watersmeet)
- Area code: 906
- GNIS feature ID: 1621886

Thayer is an unincorporated community in Gogebic County, in the U.S. state of Michigan.

== History ==
The community was named for J. O. Thayer, a railroad agent.
