= Arthur E. Stadler =

American politician

Arthur E. Stadler (born April 17, 1892, in Marenisco Township, Michigan), was a member of the Wisconsin State Assembly. He later resided in Owen, Wisconsin.

== Career ==
Stadler was elected to the Assembly in 1946 and re-elected in 1948. Additionally, he was a member of the School Board and Chairman of the Town Board of Owen, as well as chairman and Supervisor of the Clark County, Wisconsin Board. He was a Republican.
