= Gogebic County Courthouse =

- U.S. National Register of Historic Places
- Michigan State Historic Site
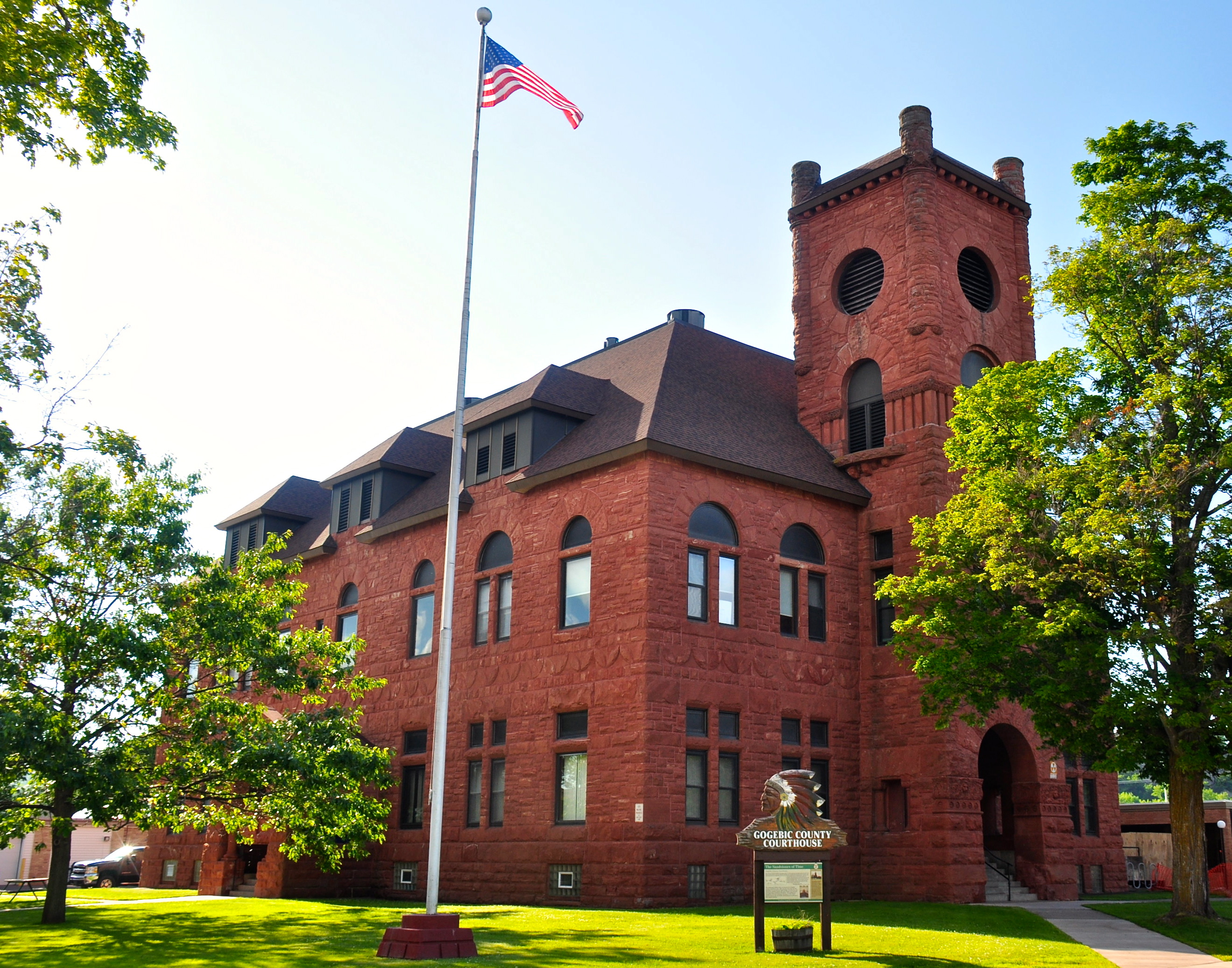
- Gogebic County Courthouse, July 2014

- Location within Michigan Location within the United States
- Interactive map showing the location of Gogebic County Courthouse
- Location: 200 N. Moore St. Bessemer, Michigan
- Coordinates: 46°28′56″N 90°3′11″W
- Area: less than one acre
- Built: 1888
- Built by: Herman Gundlach
- Architect: Charlton and Kuenzli
- Architectural style: Romanesque
- NRHP reference No.: 81000306

Significant dates
- Added to NRHP: May 8, 1981
- Designated MSHS: December 10, 1971

The Gogebic County Courthouse is a government building located on North Moore Street in Bessemer, Michigan. It was listed on the National Register of Historic Places in 1981 and designated a Michigan State Historic Site in 1971.

== History ==
Gogebic County was split from Ontonagon County in 1887. The county immediately started work on a courthouse, jail, and sheriff's office. The buildings were designed by the firm of Charlton and Kuenzli, and constructed in 1888 for $50,000 by contractor Herman Gundlach.

The courthouse was enlarged in 1915. In 1974, the original jail and sheriff's office were demolished and replaced, and an elevator tower and annex to the courthouse were constructed.

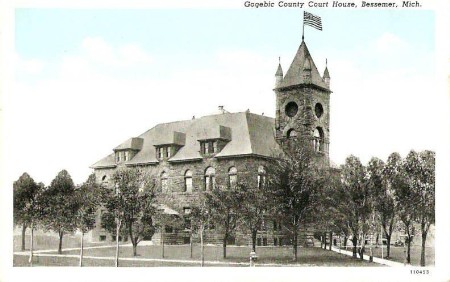
Gogebic County Courthouse, c. 1920

== Significance ==
The Gogebic County Courthouse symbolizes the cooperative effort of individuals, industries, and skilled workers in the Bessemer area in constructing a finely crafted building. It is a regional landmark, built when Gogebic County was a booming mining area, and reflects the economic prosperity of the times and the enthusiasm of county residents at a time when Gogebic County was a newly created political entity.

== Description ==
The Gogebic County Courthouse is a rectangular Romanesque red sandstone building, two stories tall with a full basement. It has a hipped roof and a four-story square tower on the front facade. The entrance is through a carved, round arched entryway in the base of the tower. Farther up the tower are rectangular windows with transoms, surrounded by carved stone, and a porthole window. A dentilated cornice runs around the roofline of the building.
