= Ironwood Charter Township, Michigan =

Ironwood Township, Michigan
- Charter township
- Charter Township of Ironwood
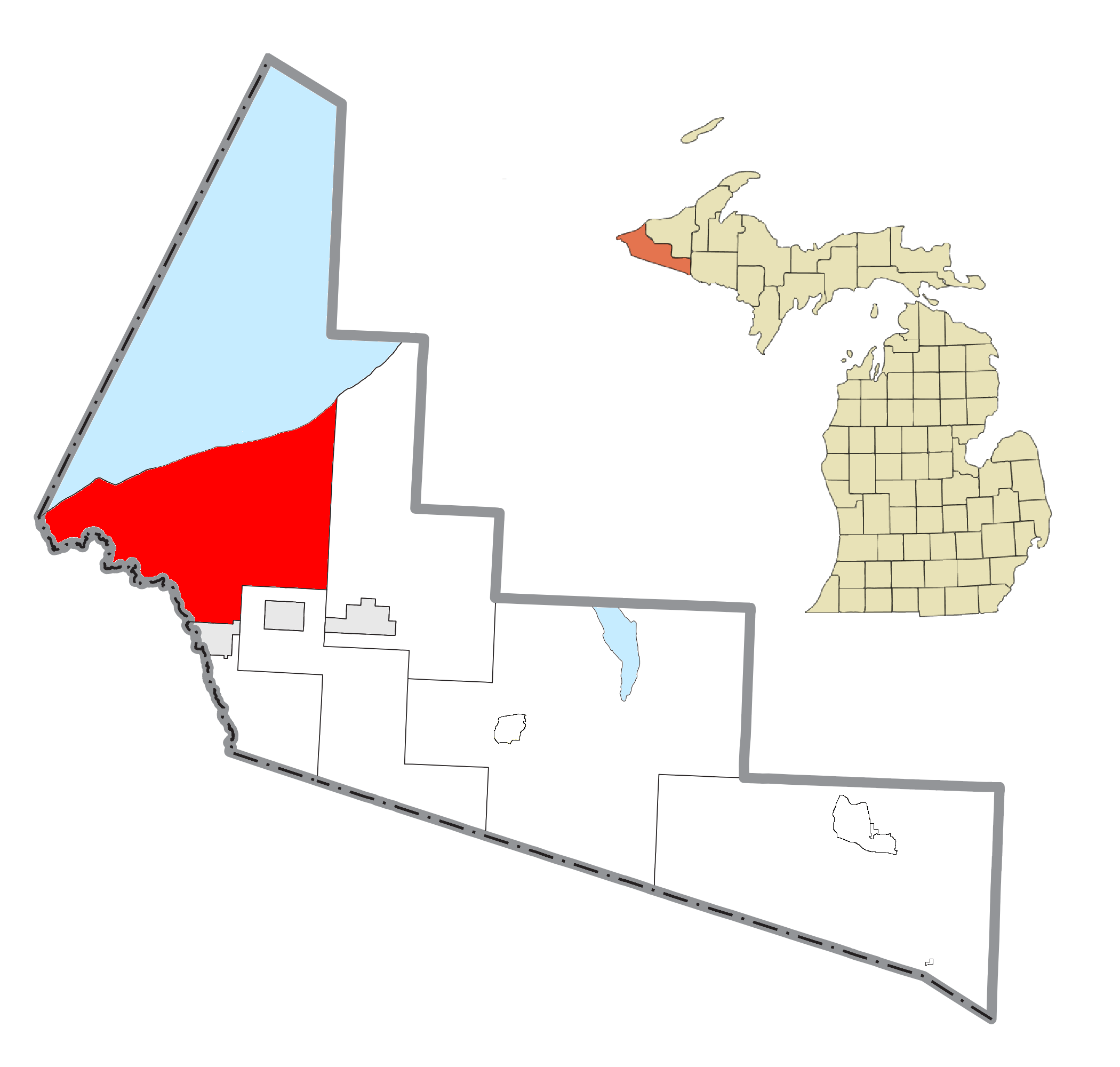
- Location within Gogebic County

- Location within the state of Michigan
- Coordinates: 46°32′49″N 90°08′35″W
- Country: United States
- State: Michigan
- County: Gogebic

Government
  - Supervisor: Jay Kangas
  - Clerk: Mary Segalin

Area
  - Total: 188.80 sq mi (488.99 km^{2})
  - Land: 175.40 sq mi (454.28 km^{2})
  - Water: 13.40 sq mi (34.71 km^{2})
- Elevation: 1,145 ft (349 m)

Population (2020)
  - Total: 2,214
  - Density: 13/sq mi (5.1/km^{2})
- Time zone: UTC-6 (Central (CST))
  - Summer (DST): UTC-5 (CDT)
- ZIP code(s): 49911 (Bessemer); 49938 (Ironwood)
- Area code: 906
- FIPS code: 26-41080
- GNIS feature ID: 1626529
- Website: Official website

Ironwood Charter Township is a charter township of Gogebic County in the U.S. state of Michigan. The population was 2,214 in 2020. The city of Ironwood borders on the south, but the two are administered autonomously.

Ironwood Township is the home of Gogebic Community College, as well as the Gogebic–Iron County Airport. Most of the land in the township is within the Ottawa National Forest. The Montreal River forms the township's western boundary with Wisconsin. The township is the westernmost municipality in the state of Michigan, as well as the largest charter township in the state by land area and the least-densely populated.

== Geography ==
According to the United States Census Bureau, the township has a total area of 188.93 square miles (489.33 km^{2}), of which 175.40 square miles (454.28 km^{2}) is land and 13.53 square miles (35.04 km^{2}) (7.10%) is water.

== Demographics ==
In 2000, there were 2,330 people, 1,024 households, and 699 families residing in the township. At the 2010 census, its population was 2,333. By 2020, its population was 2,214.
