= Ironwood Daily Globe =

American newspaper

The Globe
- Type: Weekly newspaper
- Format: Broadsheet
- Publisher: Heidi Ofstad
- Editor: Pamela Jansson
- Headquarters: 118 E McLeod Avenue; Ironwood, MI 53042; United States
- Circulation: 3250 (as of 2023)
- Website: yourdailyglobe.com

The Globe is a weekly newspaper based in Ironwood, Michigan.

The Globe serves Gogebic and Ontonagon counties in Michigan and Iron County in Wisconsin.
