= Gogebic County, Michigan =

County in Michigan, United States

- County
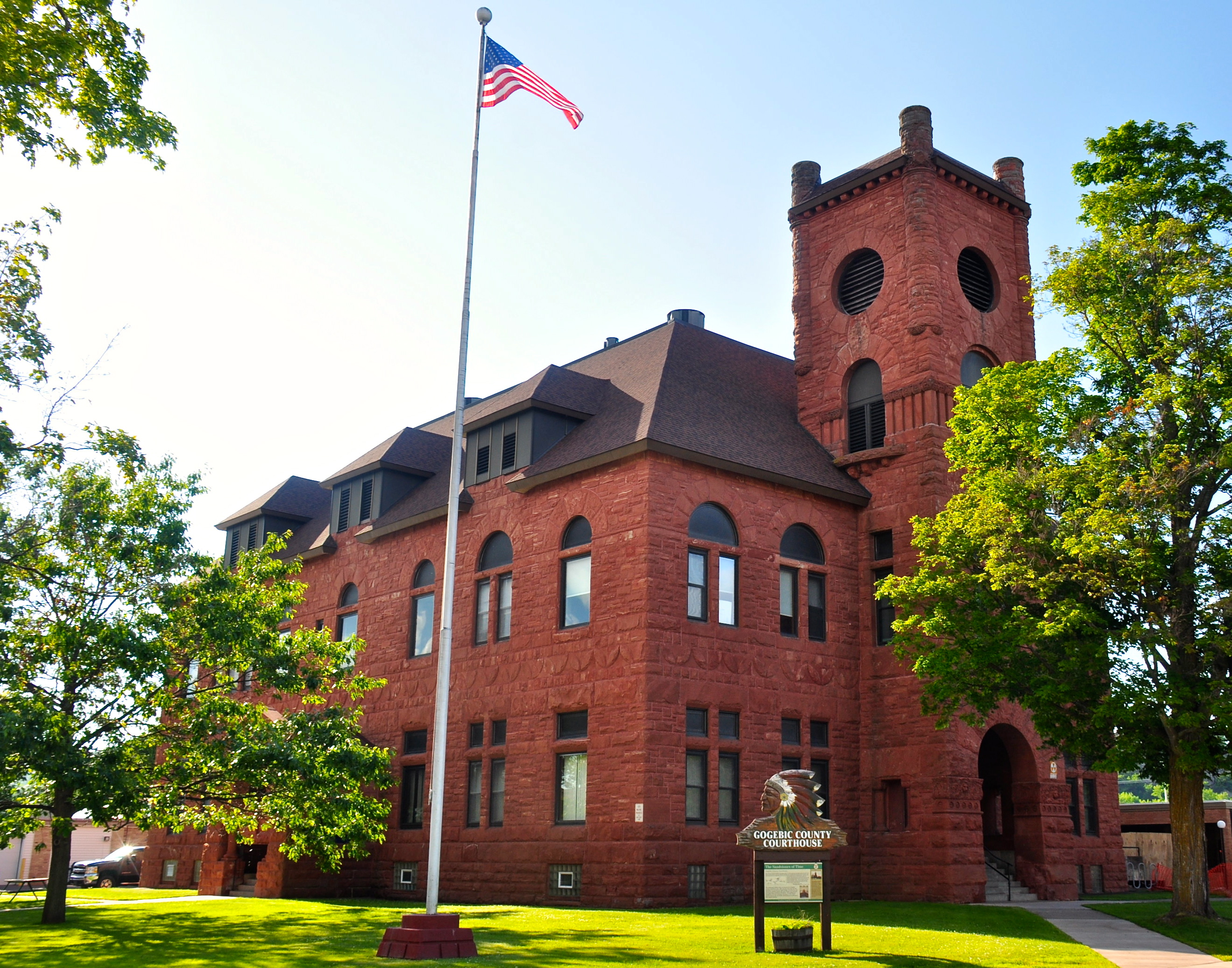
- Gogebic County Courthouse in Bessemer

- Logo

- Location within the U.S. state of Michigan
- Coordinates: 46°29′N 89°47′W
- Country: United States
- State: Michigan
- Founded: 1887
- Named for: Lake Gogebic
- Seat: Bessemer
- Largest city: Ironwood

Area
  - Total: 1,476 sq mi (3,820 km^{2})
  - Land: 1,102 sq mi (2,850 km^{2})
  - Water: 374 sq mi (970 km^{2}) 25%

Population (2020)
  - Total: 14,380
  - Estimate (2025): 14,285 ▼
  - Density: 13.05/sq mi (5.038/km^{2})
- Time zone: UTC−6 (Central)
  - Summer (DST): UTC−5 (CDT)
- Congressional district: 1st
- Website: www.gogebiccountymi.gov

Gogebic County (/ɡoʊˈɡiːbɪk/ goh-GHEE-bik or /ɡoʊˈɡɛbɪk/ goh-GHEH-bik) is a county in the Upper Peninsula of the U.S. state of Michigan. As of the 2020 census, the population was 14,380. The county seat is Bessemer. Gogebic County is the westernmost county in Michigan, and is one of four Michigan counties within the Central Time Zone. Gogebic County borders Wisconsin to the south, and has a shoreline on Lake Superior to the north.

Gogebic County has long been territory of the Lake Superior Chippewa. The Lac Vieux Desert Indian Reservation is located within Gogebic County.

== History ==
Gogebic County was organized in 1887, partitioned from Ontonagon County. The county's name derives from a lake of the same name, which was originally rendered Agogebic. Sources agree that the name is from Ojibwe, but differ on the original meaning. The county's website suggests it meant "body of water hanging on high," but an 1884 military annal said it meant "water-mold lake" (Agogibing). (See also: List of place names of Native American origin in Michigan)

== Geography ==
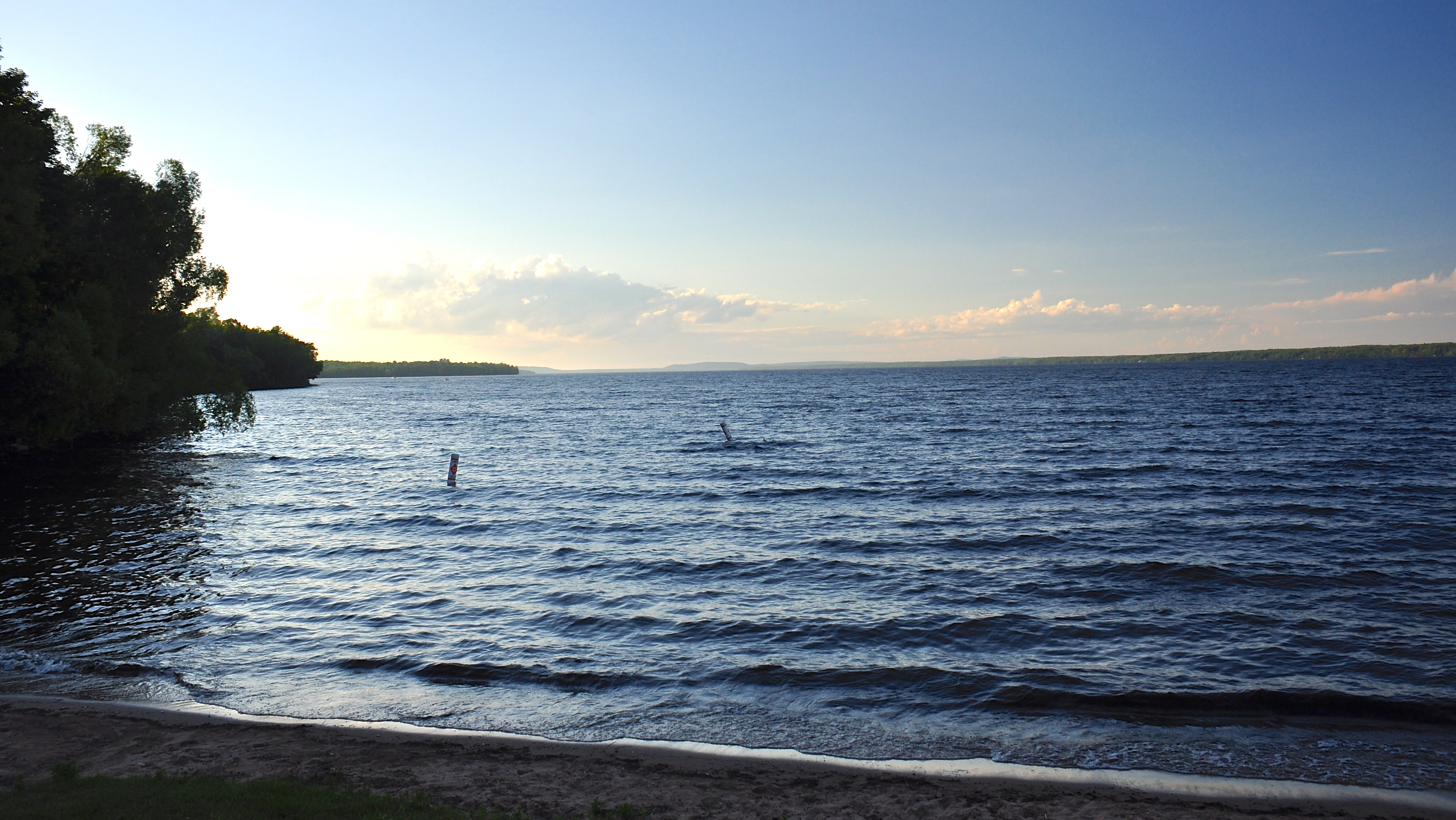
Lake Gogebic, the largest lake of the Upper Peninsula of Michigan, lies partially in Gogebic County.

According to the U.S. Census Bureau, the county has a total area of 1,476 square miles (3,820 km^{2}), of which 1,102 square miles (2,850 km^{2}) is land and 374 square miles (970 km^{2}) (25%) is water.

=== Water features ===
- Lake Superior – forms the county's northern land border.
- Lake Gogebic – the largest lake in the Upper Peninsula.
- Montreal River – forms the county's western border, as well as the state's border with Wisconsin in this area.

=== Adjacent counties ===
- Ontonagon County – north, northeast (Eastern Time)
- Iron County – east (Central Time)
- Vilas County, Wisconsin – south
- Iron County, Wisconsin – southwest
- Ashland County, Wisconsin – northwest

=== National protected area ===
- Ottawa National Forest (part)

=== State protected area ===
- Lake Gogebic State Park

== Communities ==
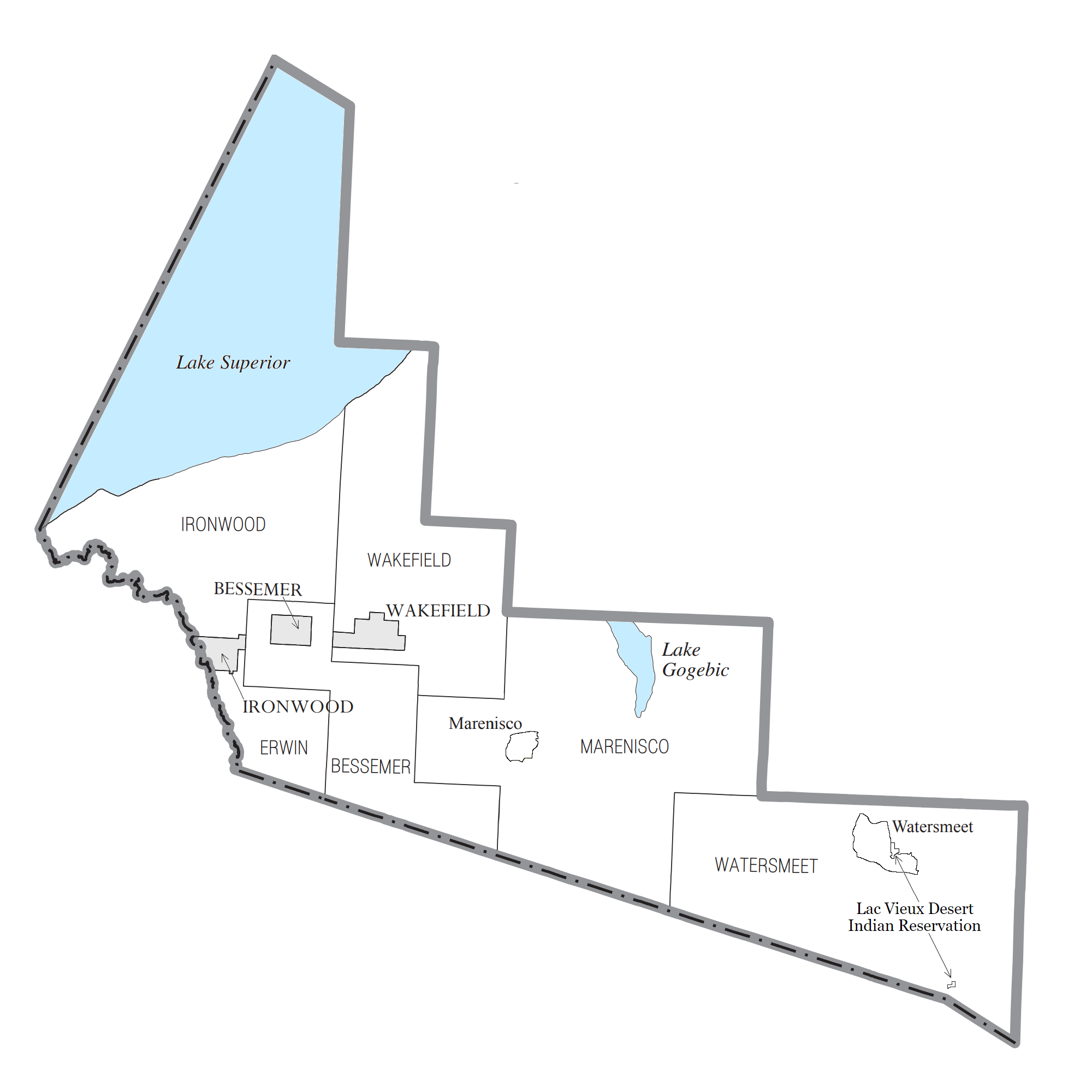
U.S. Census data map showing local municipal boundaries within Gogebic County, as well as CDP boundaries. Shaded areas represent incorporated cities.

=== Cities ===
- Bessemer (county seat)
- Ironwood
- Wakefield

=== Charter township ===
- Ironwood Charter Township

=== Civil townships ===
- Bessemer Township
- Erwin Township
- Marenisco Township
- Wakefield Township
- Watersmeet Township

=== Census-designated places ===
- Marenisco
- Ramsay
- Watersmeet

=== Other unincorporated communities ===
- Anvil
- Connorville
- Dunham
- Harley
- Puritan
- Siemens
- Tamarack
- Thayer
- Thomaston
- Tula
- Wellington

=== Indian reservations ===
- Lac Vieux Desert Indian Reservation

== Demographics ==
Historical population
Census	Pop.	Note	%±
1890	13,166		—
1900	16,738		27.1%
1910	23,333		39.4%
1920	33,225		42.4%
1930	31,577		−5.0%
1940	31,797		0.7%
1950	27,053		−14.9%
1960	24,370		−9.9%
1970	20,676		−15.2%
1980	19,686		−4.8%
1990	18,052		−8.3%
2000	17,370		−3.8%
2010	16,427		−5.4%
2020	14,380		−12.5%
2025 (est.)	14,285	▼	−0.7%
U.S. Decennial Census; 1790-1960 1900-1990; 1990-2000 2010-2018

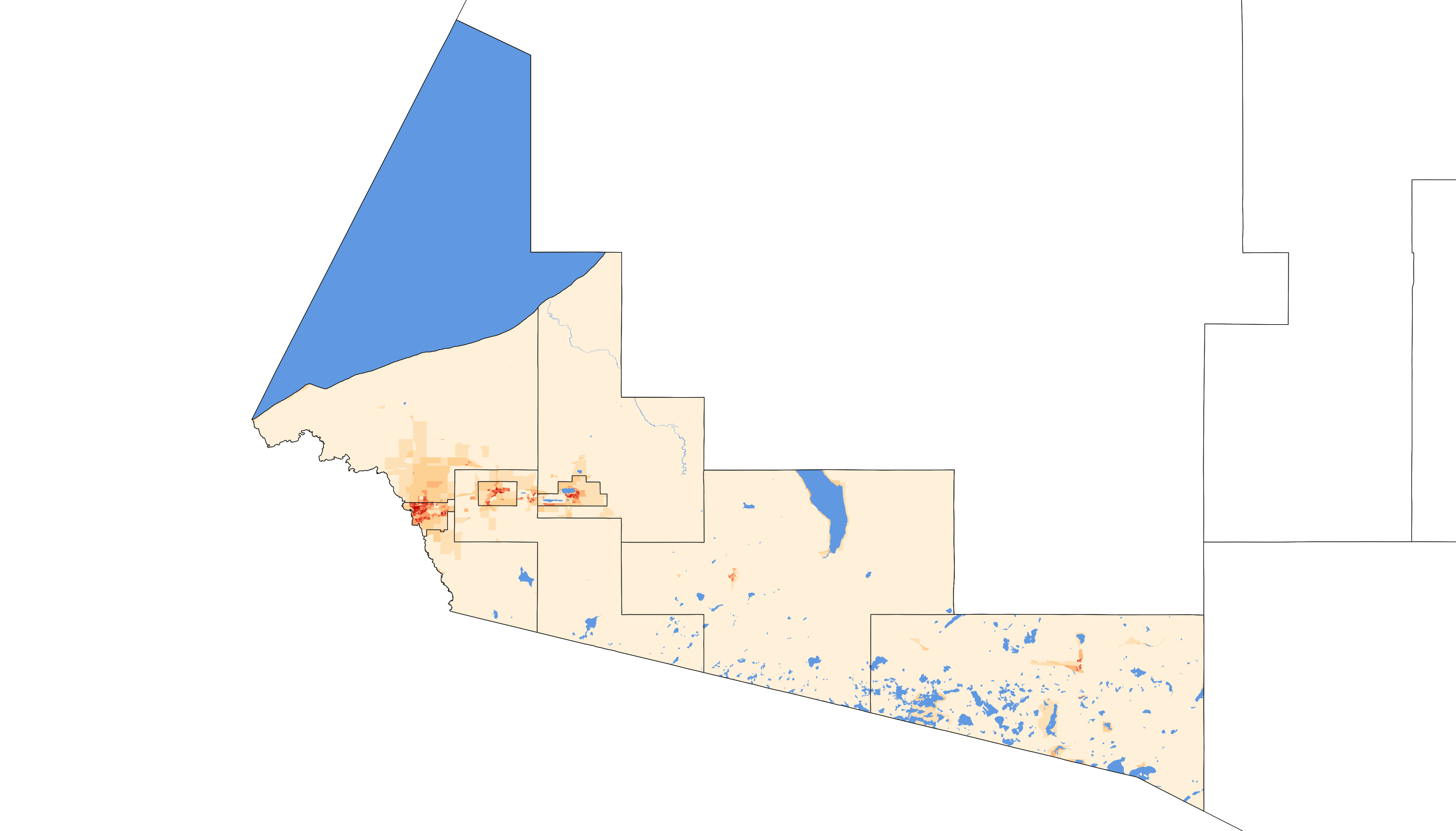
2020 population density of Gogebic County by census block

=== Racial and ethnic composition ===
Gogebic County, Michigan – Racial and ethnic composition Note: the US Census treats Hispanic/Latino as an ethnic category. This table excludes Latinos from the racial categories and assigns them to a separate category. Hispanics/Latinos may be of any race.
Race / Ethnicity (NH = Non-Hispanic)	Pop 1980	Pop 1990	Pop 2000	Pop 2010	Pop 2020	% 1980	% 1990	% 2000	% 2010	% 2020
White alone (NH)	19,206	17,435	16,297	14,965	12,981	97.56%	96.58%	93.82%	91.10%	90.27%
Black or African American alone (NH)	129	240	299	676	65	0.66%	1.33%	1.72%	4.12%	0.45%
Native American or Alaska Native alone (NH)	260	282	374	383	512	1.32%	1.56%	2.15%	2.33%	3.56%
Asian alone (NH)	20	25	40	37	35	0.10%	0.14%	0.23%	0.23%	0.24%
Native Hawaiian or Pacific Islander alone (NH)	x	x	1	1	3	x	x	0.01%	0.01%	0.02%
Other race alone (NH)	11	3	5	3	36	0.06%	0.02%	0.03%	0.02%	0.25%
Mixed race or Multiracial (NH)	x	x	201	220	526	x	x	1.16%	1.34%	3.66%
Hispanic or Latino (any race)	60	67	153	142	222	0.30%	0.37%	0.88%	0.86%	1.54%
Total	19,686	18,052	17,370	16,427	14,380	100.00%	100.00%	100.00%	100.00%	100.00%

=== 2020 census ===
As of the 2020 census, the county had a population of 14,380. The median age was 51.0 years, 16.5% of residents were under the age of 18, and 28.0% of residents were 65 years of age or older. For every 100 females there were 103.1 males, and for every 100 females age 18 and over there were 103.5 males age 18 and over.

The racial makeup of the county was 90.8% White, 0.5% Black or African American, 3.6% American Indian and Alaska Native, 0.2% Asian, <0.1% Native Hawaiian and Pacific Islander, 0.5% from some other race, and 4.3% from two or more races. Hispanic or Latino residents of any race comprised 1.5% of the population.

35.9% of residents lived in urban areas, while 64.1% lived in rural areas.

There were 6,874 households in the county, of which 19.1% had children under the age of 18 living in them. Of all households, 41.3% were married-couple households, 25.2% were households with a male householder and no spouse or partner present, and 25.0% were households with a female householder and no spouse or partner present. About 38.0% of all households were made up of individuals and 17.7% had someone living alone who was 65 years of age or older.

There were 10,393 housing units, of which 33.9% were vacant. Among occupied housing units, 77.8% were owner-occupied and 22.2% were renter-occupied. The homeowner vacancy rate was 2.9% and the rental vacancy rate was 17.1%.

=== American Community Survey ===
Its population remained predominantly non-Hispanic white, and the largest ancestries as of 2022's American Community Survey were German (16.5%), Italian (13.6%), English (9.5%), and Polish (7.9%).

=== 2010 census ===
The 2010 United States census indicated Gogebic County had a population of 16,427. This decrease of 943 people from the 2000 United States census was a -5.4% change in population. In 2010, there were 7,037 households and 4,171 families residing in the county. The population density was 15 people per square mile (5.8 people/km^{2}). There were 10,795 housing units at an average density of 10 per square mile (3.9/km^{2}).

Among them, 91.7% of the population were White, 4.1% Black or African American, 2.4% Native American, 0.2% Asian, 0.2% of some other race and 1.4% of two or more races. 0.9% were Hispanic or Latino (of any race). 17.4% were of Finnish, 12.8% German, 11.2% American, 10.0% Italian, 6.8% Polish, 6.7% English and 5.1% Irish ancestry.

In 2010, there were 7,037 households, out of which 20.6% had children under the age of 18 living with them, 45.4% were married couples living together, 9.3% had a female householder with no husband present, and 40.7% were non-families. 35.3% of all households were made up of individuals, and 16.5% had someone living alone who was 65 years of age or older. The average household size was 2.11 and the average family size was 2.69. Its county population was 16.9% under the age of 18, 8.4% from 18 to 24, 22.2% from 25 to 44, 31.1% from 45 to 64, and 21.5% who were 65 years of age or older. The median age was 46.8 years. 53.3% of the population was male, and 46.7% of the population was female.

As of 2010, the median income for a household in the county was $34,917, and the median income for a family was $47,219. The per capita income for the county was $20,759. About 14.0% of families and 17.2% of the population were below the poverty line, including 28.6% of those under age 18 and 9.0% of those age 65 or over.

== Sports ==
Gogebic is the only known place in the Upper Peninsula to ever host a professional sports team, with Ironwood hosting the Northwest Football League's Gogebic Panthers in 1935 and 1936. Their 1935 campaign was immensely successful as the Panthers finished with a 6–1 record, their only loss coming to the eventual league champion La Crosse Old Style Lagers. Their 1936 campaign featured a 6–0 victory over the Madison Cardinals, who folded a few days after the Lagers defeated them 100–0 in an effort to kick them out of the league.

== Politics ==
Gogebic County was reliably Republican at the beginning of the twentieth century. Roosevelt's New Deal changed the county's mood, which had voted for the Democratic candidate in all but 2 presidential elections between 1932 and 2012. In 2016, Donald Trump became the first Republican to win the county since Richard Nixon did in 1972. Trump carried the county again in 2020, despite losing nationally, and again in 2024, by a larger margin each time.

The county is strongly liberal on economic issues and also tends to be somewhat liberal on cultural issues, voting in favor of Michigan Proposal 2 and Michigan Proposal 3, which loosened voter restrictions and codified abortion rights, respectively. Both referendums passed statewide but the latter failed in most counties in the Upper Peninsula. However, the county's heavily unionized electorate is significantly more conservative on other issues, such as affirmative action, as over 70% of Gogebic County residents voted in favor of the Republican-led Michigan Civil Rights Initiative, which banned affirmative action.

United States presidential election results for Gogebic County, Michigan
Year	Republican		Democratic		Third party(ies)	
Year	No.	%	No.	%	No.	%
1888	1,367	54.35%	1,112	44.21%	36	1.43%
1892	2,344	57.25%	1,615	39.45%	135	3.30%
1896	1,982	68.37%	837	28.87%	80	2.76%
1900	2,166	73.13%	676	22.82%	120	4.05%
1904	2,111	77.98%	414	15.29%	182	6.72%
1908	2,256	72.96%	614	19.86%	222	7.18%
1912	818	26.92%	572	18.82%	1,649	54.26%
1916	2,204	55.04%	1,540	38.46%	260	6.49%
1920	5,486	79.72%	823	11.96%	573	8.33%
1924	5,128	66.54%	487	6.32%	2,092	27.14%
1928	6,061	64.74%	3,134	33.48%	167	1.78%
1932	5,379	46.69%	5,531	48.01%	611	5.30%
1936	4,649	35.07%	8,461	63.82%	147	1.11%
1940	6,431	40.87%	9,104	57.86%	199	1.26%
1944	5,283	39.82%	7,938	59.83%	47	0.35%
1948	5,204	41.40%	6,722	53.48%	643	5.12%
1952	6,195	47.47%	6,803	52.13%	53	0.41%
1956	6,865	52.68%	6,142	47.13%	25	0.19%
1960	5,429	42.89%	7,200	56.88%	30	0.24%
1964	3,350	29.60%	7,945	70.19%	24	0.21%
1968	4,140	39.71%	5,839	56.00%	447	4.29%
1972	5,631	52.26%	4,984	46.25%	161	1.49%
1976	3,953	38.04%	6,341	61.02%	98	0.94%
1980	4,388	42.80%	5,254	51.25%	610	5.95%
1984	4,006	41.81%	5,554	57.97%	21	0.22%
1988	3,509	40.38%	5,151	59.27%	31	0.36%
1992	2,838	30.76%	4,792	51.95%	1,595	17.29%
1996	2,769	33.83%	4,436	54.19%	981	11.98%
2000	3,929	47.12%	4,066	48.76%	344	4.13%
2004	3,935	46.56%	4,421	52.31%	96	1.14%
2008	3,330	40.21%	4,757	57.44%	194	2.34%
2012	3,444	45.24%	4,058	53.30%	111	1.46%
2016	4,018	54.42%	2,925	39.62%	440	5.96%
2020	4,600	55.58%	3,570	43.14%	106	1.28%
2024	4,803	57.90%	3,385	40.81%	107	1.29%

United States Senate election results for Gogebic County, Michigan1
Year	Republican		Democratic		Third party(ies)	
Year	No.	%	No.	%	No.	%
2024	4,536	56.35%	3,250	40.37%	264	3.28%

Michigan Gubernatorial election results for Gogebic County
Year	Republican		Democratic		Third party(ies)	
Year	No.	%	No.	%	No.	%
2022	3,413	52.78%	2,940	45.47%	113	1.75%

== Government ==
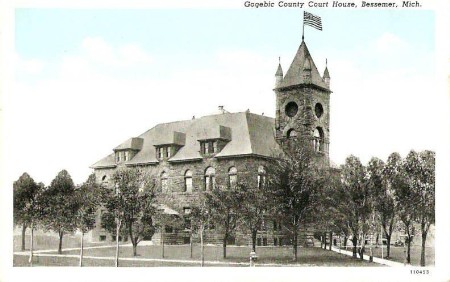
Gogebic County Courthouse circa 1920

The county government operates the jail, maintains rural roads, operates the major local courts, maintains vital records and property records, administers public health regulations, and participates with the state in the provision of welfare and other social services. The county board of commissioners controls the budget and has limited authority to make laws or ordinances. In Michigan, most local government functions—police and fire, building and zoning, tax assessment, street maintenance, etc.—are the responsibility of individual cities and townships.

== Transportation ==
=== Major highways ===
- US 2
- Bus. US 2 serves the city of Ironwood.
- US 45
- M-28
- M-64

=== Transit ===
- Indian Trails

=== Airport ===
- KIWD - Gogebic-Iron County Airport – 7 miles (11 km) NE of Ironwood. Commercial air service is available.

== See also ==
- List of Michigan State Historic Sites in Gogebic County, Michigan
- National Register of Historic Places listings in Gogebic County, Michigan
