= Marenisco Township, Michigan =

- Civil township
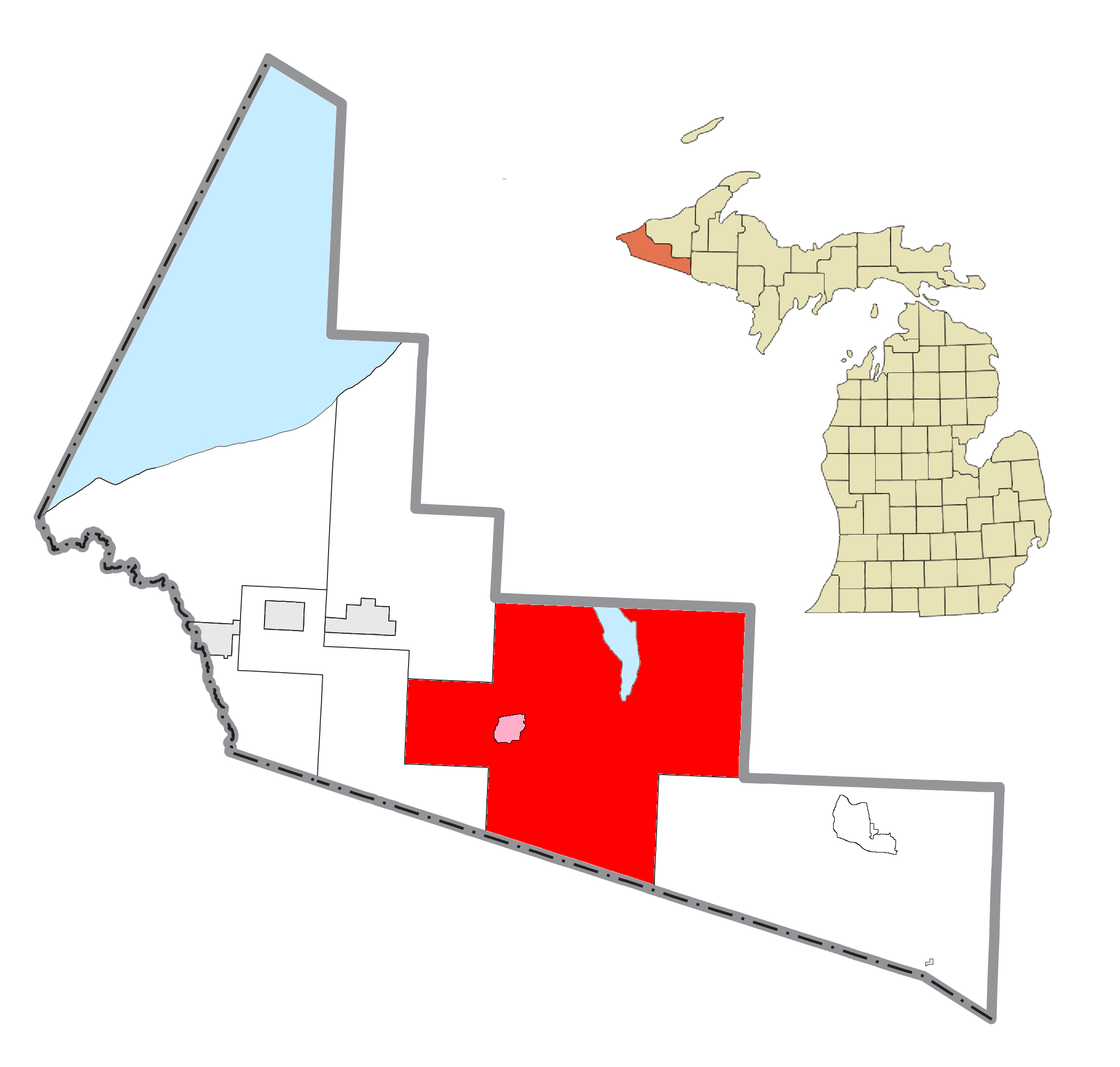
- Location within Gogebic County (red) and the administered community of Marenisco (pink)

- Location within the state of Michigan
- Coordinates: 46°21′58″N 89°35′49″W
- Country: United States
- State: Michigan
- County: Gogebic

Government
  - Supervisor: Richard Bouvette
  - Clerk: Donna Kenney

Area
  - Total: 325.9 sq mi (844.0 km^{2})
  - Land: 310.9 sq mi (805.1 km^{2})
  - Water: 15.0 sq mi (38.9 km^{2})
- Elevation: 1,493 ft (455 m)

Population (2020)
  - Total: 455
  - Density: 1.46/sq mi (0.565/km^{2})
- Time zone: UTC-6 (Central (CST))
  - Summer (DST): UTC-5 (CDT)
- ZIP code(s): 49910 (Bergland); 49925 (Ewen); 49947 (Marenisco); 49968 (Wakefield); 49969 (Watersmeet)
- Area code: 906
- FIPS code: 26-51560
- GNIS feature ID: 1626685
- Website: Official website

Marenisco Township is a civil township of Gogebic County in the U.S. state of Michigan. The population was 455 at the 2020 census, a significant decrease from 1,727 at the 2010 census.

The unincorporated community of Marenisco is within the township on the Presque Isle River near the junction of U.S. Highway 2 and M-64 at 46°22′35″N 89°41′47″W. Wakefield is about 15 miles (24 km) northwest, and Watersmeet about 27 miles (43 km) southeast on US 2.

The name was formed by combining the first three letters of the first, middle, and last names of Mary Enid Scott, the wife of E. H. Scott, a timber producer.

== Geography ==
According to the United States Census Bureau, the township has a total area of 325.9 square miles (844 km^{2}), of which 310.9 square miles (805 km^{2}) is land and 15.0 square miles (38.9 km^{2} or 4.61%) is water. It is the second-largest township in land area in Michigan (after McMillan Township in Luce County).

=== Climate ===
The climate is described as Humid Continental by the Köppen Climate System, abbreviated as Dfb.

== Demographics ==
As of the census of 2000, there were 1,051 people, 264 households, and 186 families residing in the township. In 2020, there were 455 people in the township.

== Transportation ==
=== Major highways ===
- US 2
- M-64

=== Bus service ===
- Indian Trails provides daily intercity bus service between St. Ignace and Ironwood, Michigan.

== Notable people ==
- Arthur E. Stadler, (1892-?) was a member of the Wisconsin State Assembly, chairman of the town board of Owen, chairman and supervisor of the Clark County, Wisconsin Board
