= Wakefield, Michigan =

- City
- City of Wakefield
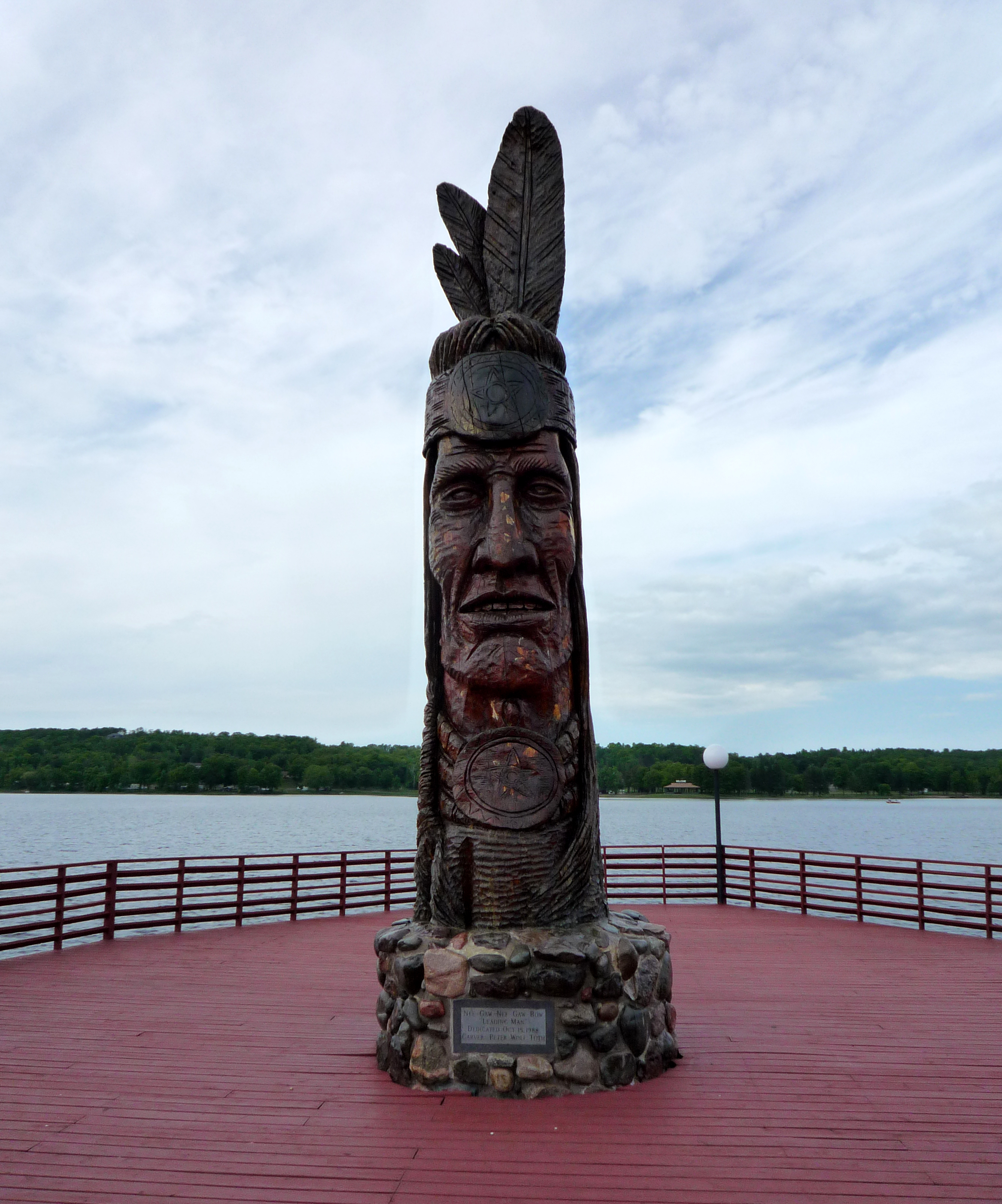
- Nee-Gaw-Nee-Gaw-Bow (Leading Man), by Peter Wolf Toth (1988), to honor the Ojibwe people; it is located on the lakeside pier next to the Wakefield Visitor’s Center and was carved from one piece of pine donated by the Ottawa National Forest. It is one of Toth's Whispering Giants.

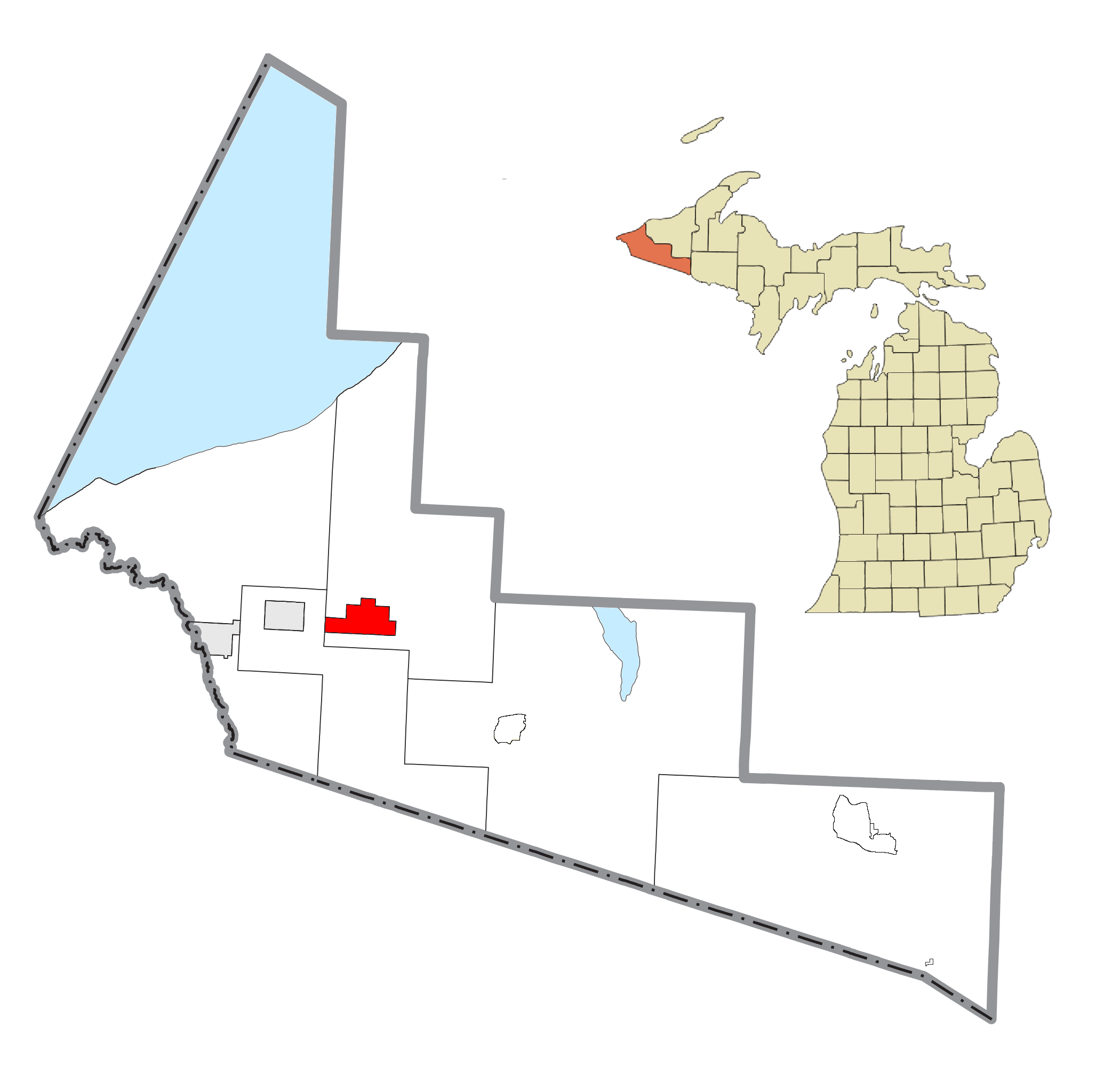
- Location within Gogebic County

- Location within the state of Michigan
- Coordinates: 46°28′34″N 89°56′21″W
- Country: United States
- State: Michigan
- County: Gogebic
- Incorporated: 1887 (village); 1919 (city)

Government
  - Type: Council–manager
  - City council: Dale White (Mayor); Amy Tarro (Pro tem); Kay Wiita; James Anderson
  - City manager: Robert Brown Jr.
  - City clerk: Sue Ahonen
  - Treasurer: Mandy Lake
  - City attorney: Ray O'Dea

Area
  - Total: 8.44 sq mi (21.85 km^{2})
  - Land: 7.87 sq mi (20.39 km^{2})
  - Water: 0.57 sq mi (1.47 km^{2})
- Elevation: 1,539 ft (469 m)

Population (2020)
  - Total: 1,702
  - Density: 216.2/sq mi (83.47/km^{2})
- Time zone: UTC-6 (Central (CST))
  - Summer (DST): UTC-5 (CDT)
- ZIP code(s): 49968
- Area code: 906
- FIPS code: 26-82780
- GNIS feature ID: 1622046
- Website: Official website

Wakefield is a city in Gogebic County in the U.S. state of Michigan. The population was 1,702 at the 2020 census.

Wakefield is located in the western Upper Peninsula about 10 miles (16 km) east of the Wisconsin border. The city is mostly surrounded by Wakefield Township, but the two are administered autonomously. U.S. Route 2 passes through the city, and M-28 has its western terminus in the city.

It is home to Sunday Lake, Snow River Mountain Resort, Gogebic County Medical Care Facility, and Gogebic County Community Mental Health Authority. Once a mining town, the economy is now based upon the forest industry, goods and services, and tourism.

== History ==
=== Founding ===
George Mix Wakefield, born February 6, 1839, in Henderson, New York, a son of James Patterson Wakefield and Hannah B. Hall, had the town site of Wakefield platted in May 1886; the general location was already being referred to as "Wakefield" as early as the fall of 1884. His parents moved their family to Waukesha County, Wisconsin in October 1844. Mr. Wakefield became interested in logging and real estate and acquired vast tracts of land in the western Upper Peninsula of Michigan in the 1870s and 1880s. Together with various other capitalists he built sawmills and logged the pine forests of the area, and later became involved in mineral exploration. He was one of the parties who held interests in the mineral rights to the Sunday Lake mine, as well as a few nearby properties.

=== George M. Wakefield ===
Mr. Wakefield moved to Milwaukee, Wisconsin in 1879 and established a real estate business, dealing in timber and mineral lands in Michigan, Wisconsin, Texas, and Alaska. He was secretary-treasurer of the Ontonagon River Improvement and Boom Company, organized in 1880. They made it possible to float logs out to Lake Superior and built a sawmill on an island near the mouth of the Ontonagon River in Ontonagon, Michigan.

The G. M. Wakefield Mineral Land Company was formed in Milwaukee, Wisconsin on September 18, 1899, for the purpose of dealing in mineral lands, timber, agricultural lands, and real estate. George M. Wakefield, his wife and their son Vernon T. Wakefield were the stockholders with a capital stock of $50,000 divided into 500 shares. Most of the land held was in Township 47 North, between Wakefield and Lake Gogebic. Mr. Wakefield was also a major stockholder in the Beacon, Continental, Cosmos, International, and Summit mineral land companies.

The Wakefield ancestry is traced back to John Wakefield, who was born about 1614, probably in Gravesend, County Kent, England and immigrated to Virginia aboard the "America" in June 1635, along with his brothers Richard Wakefield and Thomas Wakefield. John Wakefield eventually settled at Martha’s Vineyard, Massachusetts.

=== Incorporation ===
Wakefield was incorporated as a village by the Gogebic County Board of Supervisors on November 20, 1887. It became incorporated as a city in 1919.

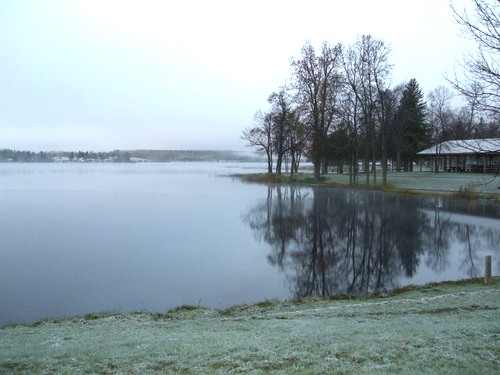
Sunday Lake

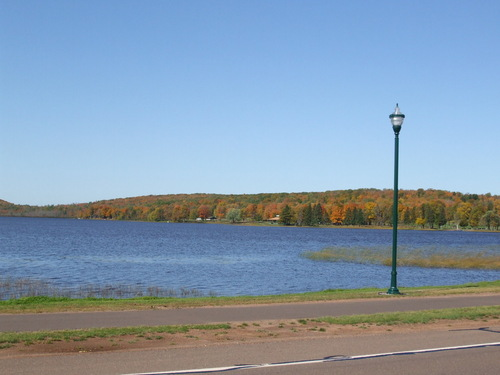
Sunday Lake in autumn

=== Mining boom ===
The founding of Wakefield and much of its early history was based upon the discovery of iron ore on the east end of Sunday Lake by George A. Fay in 1881. Upon its discovery, several mining companies rushed to the area and many mines opened. Villages such as Plymouth, Pike, Castile, and Comet got their names from these iron mines. The first mines in Wakefield were the Sunday Lake, Iron Chief, and the Brotherton. According to the Gogebic Range Directory of 1888, the output of these mines in 1886 was as follows: Sunday Lake, 13,00 tons; Iron Chief, 9,584 tons, and the Brotherton, about 3,500 tons.

Wakefield's iron mines include:

- MIKADO Captain John Lester did pioneering work on the MIKADO in 1886. Development occurred off and on for several years, until the first ore was shipped in 1895. The mine is credited with shipping over one million tons from 1895 to 1917. Shipments from 1919 to 1952 were sent under the PLYMOUTH name. The MIKADO mine was located on the northwest end of the open pit, in Verona location.
- PILGRIM Explorations began on this location in the spring of 1886 under Captain Harry Letcher. Nothing was shipped until 1919–27 when the PILGRIM made shipments of twenty-two thousand tons. The PILGRIM was located just east of the MIKADO.
- PLYMOUTH The PLYMOUTH open-pit mine operated just to the west of the WAKEFIELD, but the PLYMOUTH was entirely an open pit operation, with the possible exception of a small amount of ore taken out of the No.3 shaft as it was being sunk. It began shipping in 1916 and closed on November 6, 1952, having shipped almost seventeen million tons.
- WAKEFIELD Drill exploration began on the WAKEFIELD property in July 1912, and two shafts were down by the following summer. The first ore shipment was made on October 15, 1913. The WAKEFIELD soon became an open-pit mine, shipping a total of almost fourteen million gross tons from 1913 to 1954.
- CITY OF CHICAGO Exploration began in the latter part of 1886 at this location on the north shore of Sunday lake. The SPARTA operated on the same location in 1888 and the CITY OF CHICAGO returned in 1896, eventually producing shipments of almost one hundred thousand tons of ore between 1896 and 1915. It was also called the SOUTH CHICAGO in 1915.
- SPARTA The former CITY OF CHICAGO exploration became the SPARTA in 1888. It was developed and shipped almost ten thousand tons from 1891 to 1895.
- ALPHA In the summer of 1886 the Alpha Iron Mining Company sank a shaft near the north shore of Sunday lake. By 1890 this location was taken over by the PIKE mine.
- PIKE Captain Robinson D. Pike (1838–1906) of Bayfield, Wisconsin took over the former ALPHA option in 1889. Ten years later the PIKE made its first shipment, with total shipments of over one hundred five thousand tons from 1899 to 1910. In 1927 the PIKE became part of the SUNDAY LAKE GROUP.
- BROTHERTON Frank H. Brotherton began mineral explorations near Sunday lake in the summer of 1883. The first iron ore was shipped from the mine in 1886, with total shipments amounting to two million six hundred ninety thousand tons by the time the mine closed in 1923.
- SUNDAY LAKE This location was first explored in 1881 by George Fay. Development picked up by 1884, and the first iron shipment left port at Ashland on November 19, 1885. The SUNDAY LAKE mine later encompassed all of Section 10 and the former BROTHERTON mine. Over seventeen million gross tons of ore went out from 1885 to 1961. The mine closed on February 16, 1961.
- IRON CHIEF Development of the IRON CHIEF mine began in 1884 under the Fink Mining Company. It was originally called the ASCHERMANN for Edward Aschermann (18341904) of Appleton, Wisconsin. The mine shipped about twelve thousand tons of iron ore in 1886 and 1887.
- CASTILE Captain Pentecost Mitchell (1861–1933) discovered iron ore on this location in 1886. The CASTILE began producing in 1906 and shipped almost nine hundred thousand tons of ore by the time it closed in 1923.
- METEOR The METEOR started as an exploration in 1890, called the NORTON. It was developed into a mine by 1900 and operated until 1904, shipping one hundred thirty-two thousand tons between 1899 and 1904. Over six million tons of stockpile ore went under the name NORTH MIKADO.
- COMET Captain Pentecost Mitchell found ore here and an exploration called the ECLlPSE was developed from 1886 to 1890. The COMET began in 1890 making its first ore shipment in August. The COMET was shut down in 1893 reopening in 1900 and operating until 1902 as part of the METEOR mine. It is credited with shipments of eighty-nine thousand tons in 1890–93.
- MORGAN The MORGAN mine east of Wakefield was developed in 1918–23 and made its first ore shipment on January 30, 1923. It operated until 1925 and shipped over fifty-eight thousand tons.
- VICAR The easternmost productive mine on the Gogebic Range covered most of Section 12, east of Wakefield. This location was once called the JONES & LAUGHLIN exploration and included the old PHOENIX exploration that dated back to 1887. The VICAR shipped about one hundred two thousand tons in 1950–51.

== Post-mining era ==
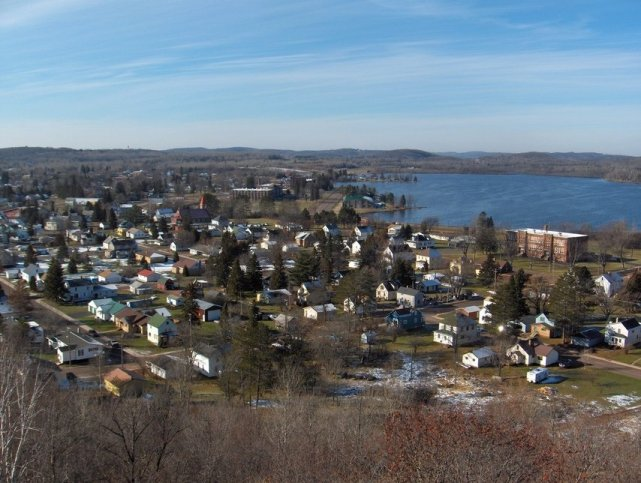
View from "Tank Hill"

After the closure of the Sunday Lake Mine on February 16, 1961, the local economy shifted from one of mining to the forest industry, goods and services and tourism.

Logging had been a mainstay of the local economy since the early 1900s. In 1941, the county embarked upon a county forest project to demonstrate that with selective cutting, under proper management, forests could be perpetuated, of increasing value and quality. By 1956, the project included 45,604 acres (184.55 km^{2}) out of the total of 703,102 acres (2,845.35 km^{2}) in the county and Ottawa National Forest harvesting marked hardwoods, aspen, and conifer. In support of the local lumber industry, many successful lumber, trucking, equipment sales, and logging businesses have existed in Wakefield and many continue to do so today. They all support the larger industries of lumber and plywood mills located in Gogebic County and outlying areas.

After the local mining jobs were lost, many in the community began providing goods and services, which included restaurants, food markets, bakery, bars, gas stations, hardware stores, drug stores and other commerce that supports the needs of the community.

With an average of 156–240 in (400–610 cm) of annual snowfall, the city greatly benefits from winter tourism. Indianhead Mountain opened in 1959 and has grown to become a major tourist magnet in both winter and summer. Snowmobile trails, cross-country skiing trails, and ice fishing on Sunday Lake have also drawn many tourists to the city during the winter months. During the summer, hiking, camping, fishing, and on occasion American Power Boat Association boat races on Sunday Lake contribute to a growing local tourist industry. As a typical small town, many are drawn back to participate in the annual old-fashioned July 4 celebration. The week-long event includes softball tournaments, high school class reunions, homecoming church services, town picnic and concert at Eddy Park, a Sunday Lake run contest, Main Street parade, children's races, and fireworks display over Sunday Lake.

== 2016 storm ==
Severe storms struck the Gogebic Range during the late evening of July 11, 2016 and the early morning of July 12, 2016. The storm produced flash floods across the area and one confirmed EF0 tornado in nearby Bessemer Township. In particular, the city of Wakefield was struck with a thunderstorm with straight-line winds around 90 mph which downed numerous trees and power lines, turned over a camper trailer, and tore the roof off of a former ice rink along Sunday Lake. Following the storm, parts of the city remained without power for a considerable time before crews could restore power.

== Demographics ==
Historical population
Census	Pop.	Note	%±
1900	1,191		—
1910	714		−40.1%
1920	4,151		481.4%
1930	3,677		−11.4%
1940	3,591		−2.3%
1950	3,344		−6.9%
1960	3,231		−3.4%
1970	2,757		−14.7%
1980	2,591		−6.0%
1990	2,318		−10.5%
2000	2,085		−10.1%
2010	1,851		−11.2%
2020	1,702		−8.0%
U.S. Decennial Census

=== 2020 census ===
As of the 2020 census, Wakefield had a population of 1,702. The median age was 53.7 years. 16.0% of residents were under the age of 18 and 31.4% of residents were 65 years of age or older. For every 100 females there were 97.9 males, and for every 100 females age 18 and over there were 95.5 males age 18 and over.

0.0% of residents lived in urban areas, while 100.0% lived in rural areas.

There were 770 households in Wakefield, of which 20.5% had children under the age of 18 living in them. Of all households, 41.2% were married-couple households, 21.7% were households with a male householder and no spouse or partner present, and 28.4% were households with a female householder and no spouse or partner present. About 39.0% of all households were made up of individuals and 20.0% had someone living alone who was 65 years of age or older.

There were 951 housing units, of which 19.0% were vacant. The homeowner vacancy rate was 2.4% and the rental vacancy rate was 11.1%.

Racial composition as of the 2020 census
Race	Number	Percent
White	1,625	95.5%
Black or African American	2	0.1%
American Indian and Alaska Native	13	0.8%
Asian	4	0.2%
Native Hawaiian and Other Pacific Islander	0	0.0%
Some other race	3	0.2%
Two or more races	55	3.2%
Hispanic or Latino (of any race)	15	0.9%

=== 2010 census ===
As of the census of 2010, there were 1,851 people, 818 households, and 452 families residing in the city. The population density was 230.8 inhabitants per square mile (89.1/km^{2}). There were 994 housing units at an average density of 123.9 per square mile (47.8/km^{2}). The racial makeup of the city was 96.8% White, 0.1% African American, 1.1% Native American, 0.4% Asian, 0.5% from other races, and 1.1% from two or more races. Hispanic or Latino of any race were 1.0% of the population.

There were 818 households, of which 20.7% had children under the age of 18 living with them, 42.3% were married couples living together, 8.6% had a female householder with no husband present, 4.4% had a male householder with no wife present, and 44.7% were non-families. 38.6% of all households were made up of individuals, and 18.4% had someone living alone who was 65 years of age or older. The average household size was 2.11 and the average family size was 2.72.

The median age in the city was 50.1 years. 17.1% of residents were under the age of 18; 5.5% were between the ages of 18 and 24; 20.5% were from 25 to 44; 30% were from 45 to 64; and 26.7% were 65 years of age or older. The gender makeup of the city was 48.4% male and 51.6% female.

=== 2000 census ===
As of the census of 2000, there were 2,085 people, 883 households, and 535 families residing in the city. The population density was 261.5 inhabitants per square mile (101.0/km^{2}). There were 1,035 housing units at an average density of 129.8 per square mile (50.1/km^{2}). The racial makeup of the city was 98.23% White, 0.48% Native American, 0.05% Asian, and 1.25% from two or more races. Hispanic or Latino of any race were 0.19% of the population.

There were 883 households, out of which 21.7% had children under the age of 18 living with them, 50.1% were married couples living together, 7.2% had a female householder with no husband present, and 39.3% were non-families. 35.3% of all households were made up of individuals, and 21.5% had someone living alone who was 65 years of age or older. The average household size was 2.15 and the average family size was 2.76.

In the city, the population was spread out, with 16.1% under the age of 18, 6.9% from 18 to 24, 22.4% from 25 to 44, 24.1% from 45 to 64, and 30.5% who were 65 years of age or older. The median age was 48 years. For every 100 females, there were 90.2 males. For every 100 females age 18 and over, there were 89.3 males.

The median income for a household in the city was $25,368, and the median income for a family was $36,810. Males had a median income of $31,406 versus $21,278 for females. The per capita income for the city was $17,036. About 6.3% of families and 12.2% of the population were below the poverty line, including 17.4% of those under age 18 and 9.7% of those age 65 or over.

=== Population ===
The population peaked in 1920 with the mining boom and has been in steady decline since.

1887	1888	1891	1893	1897	1901	1903	1905	1909	1910
300	2,320	1,000	700	407	1,191	1,000	1,500	1,300	700
1920	1930	1940	1950	1960	1970	1980	1990	2000	2010
4,151	3,677	3,591	3,367	3,231	2,757	2,591	2,318	2,085	1,851

== Community ==
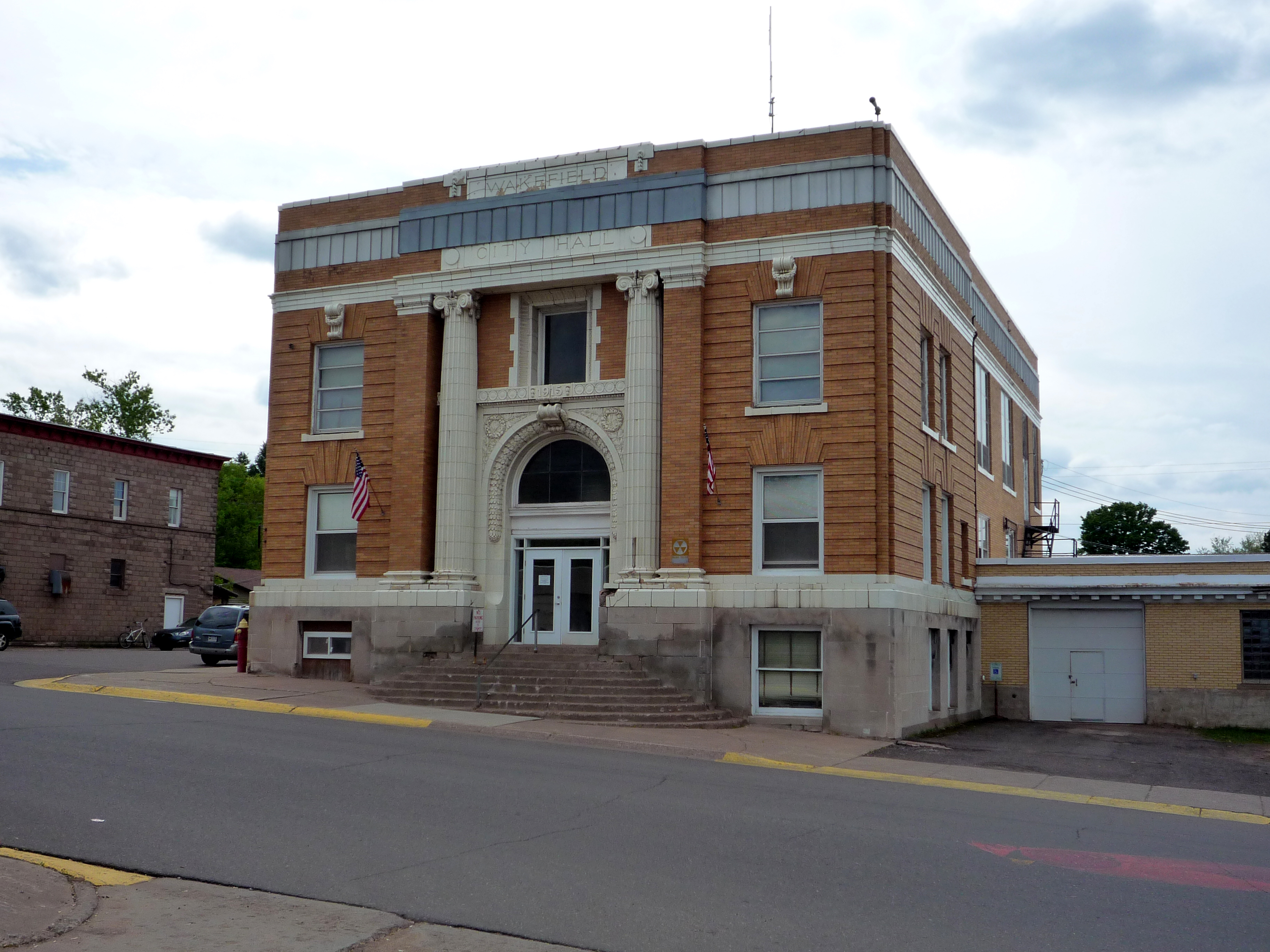
The old Wakefield City Hall at 311 Sunday Lake Street

=== City Hall ===
The City Hall is located at 509 Sunday Lake Street (Formerly the Father Daniel Hall). City departments include Water and Electric, Public Works, and Finance. The City Staff operate from the building and Department of Public Works garage which include:

- Building Inspector
- City Assessor
- City Manager
- City Clerk
- City Treasurer
- Utilities
- Department of Public Works Working Foreman
- Assistant DPW
- Electric/Water Department Working Foreman

On September 17, 2014, the City Council voted unanimously to approve a one-year Lease with Option to Purchase Agreement with the Roman Catholic Diocese of Marquette for Father Daniel Hall (FDH). That fall the old City Hall closed and the City government moved into FDH. Plans to repair or replace the old City Hall had been discussed for decades. The boilers and some bathrooms were not functioning, the exterior required extensive tuck-pointing and repair, and the building did not meet ADA standards. Many of the offices were in need of rewiring and required structural repairs. Many of the other areas were no longer utilized. As conditions deteriorated the cost of keeping the doors open increased year after year. Conversely, FDH had seen significant improvements. In 2013, the roof was replaced, and the boilers are functioning. All of the rooms are on one floor, and the entrance is handicap accessible, offering access to all residents. The new City Hall, now called the municipal building, was purchased in October 2015 for $101,899 using general funds.

=== City Council ===
The City Council consists of the Mayor, Mayor Pro Tem, and three council members who are elected for two-year terms.

=== City commissions ===
Active commissions include:

- Civil Service
- Planning
- Housing Commission

=== Development projects ===
Current projects are:

- Walking trail and lights along the southwest shoreline of Sunday Lake.
- New playground equipment at Eddy Park.
- Memorial Building demolition project.
- Renaissance Tax-Free Zone through the Michigan Renaissance Zone Act of 1996 created for both economically distressed urban and rural areas alike. Renaissance Zones are a powerful market-based program designed to spur new jobs, investment, and redevelopment in designated areas. The City of Wakefield renaissance zone is 47 acres in size and provides participating companies the advantage of tax-free incentives until 2017.

=== Memorial Building ===
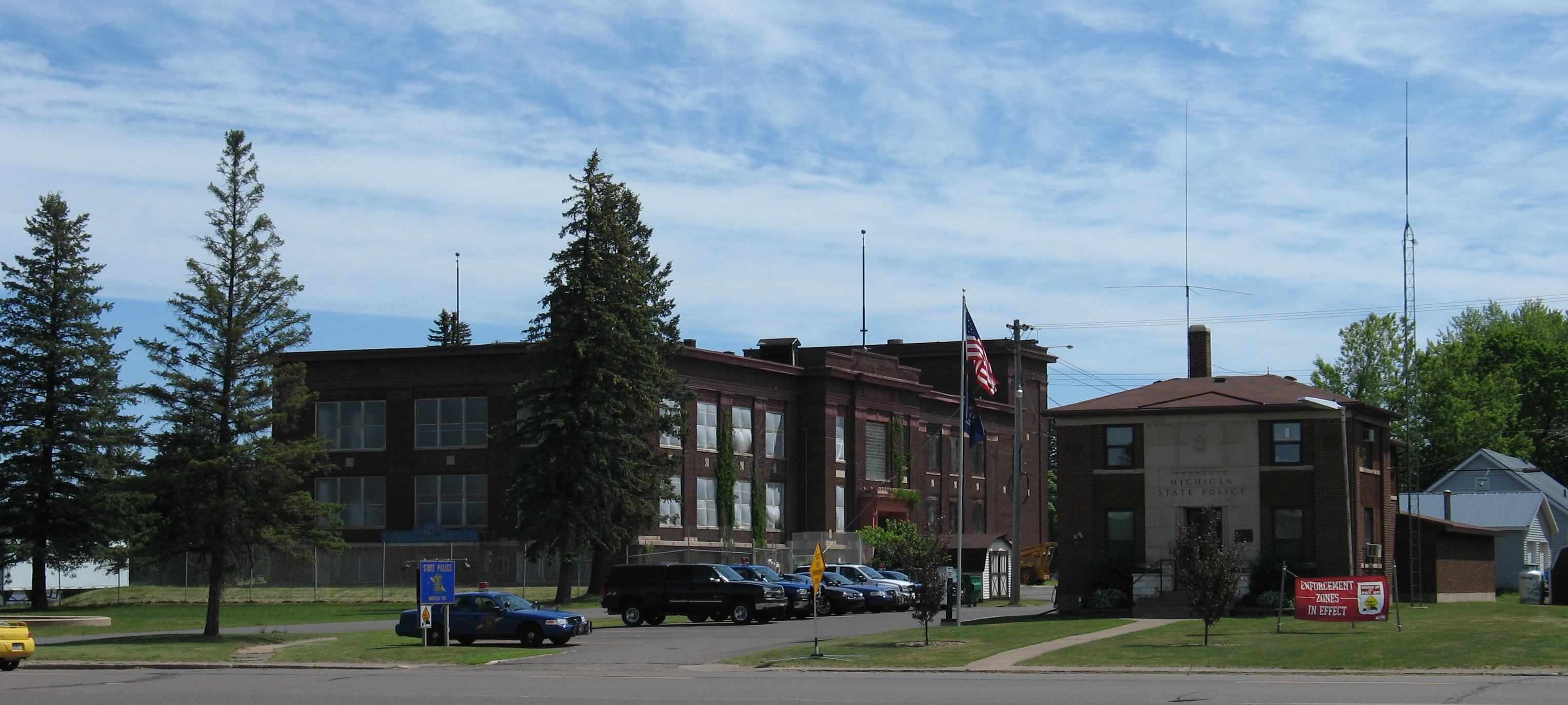
Old Memorial Building and Michigan State Police Post 87 from M-28 looking east.

Completed in 1924 on the south shore of Sunday Lake, the 52,000-square-foot (4,800 m^{2}) Wakefield Memorial Building was the center of the community. At a cost of $400,000 it was dedicated to the youth who fought in World War I. It housed a banquet area, meeting rooms, an olympic size swimming pool, and a 1,200 seat movie theater with main floor and balcony seating. By the late 1950s after the local iron mines closed, the major tax base was lost and the city no longer had adequate funds to operate the Memorial Building. During the ensuing decades, other entities owned the building but little was done to sustain it. The harsh winters soon destroyed the roof and the building was soon structurally unsound and in a dilapidated state.

In July 2004, Marvin Suomi, a 1965 graduate of Wakefield High School purchased the Wakefield Memorial Building. Headed by Mr. Suomi, the Wakefield Memorial Building Foundation was established as a 501(c)(3) organization with the goal of constructing a new, smaller, energy efficient/sustainable building. Federal and state funding were dependent upon a series of environmental reviews and assessments by both the U.S. Department of Housing and Urban Development and the Michigan State Housing Development Authority. The State Historic Preservation Office did not want the old building torn down but after lengthy negotiations a consensus was reached by the project coordinator and shortly thereafter the City Council approved the demolition. By late spring 2010 the Michigan State Historic Preservation Office approved the archival records compiled of the memorial building and Wakefield City Hall. HUD then released $147,000 in federal funds that were used to pay for the demolition. Demolition of the old Memorial Building began on July 6, 2010, and was complete on August 28, 2010. Twelve stained-glass windows from the theater auditorium were salvaged for restoration and use in the new building design. In July 2011 the City Council in conjunction with the Wakefield Memorial Building Foundation, decided to remove a roughly 9,600-square-foot (890 m^{2}) theater from the plans for a 34,000-square-foot (3,200 m^{2}) building. The new building will function as a community center and house city offices, the city library, and a swimming pool. When the project is complete, the new building will be operated by the city and utilized by the entire community. It is currently unknown if or when the project will proceed.

=== Education ===
- The Wakefield-Marenisco School is located on the southeast shore of Sunday Lake. The first building on site was erected in 1890, and the first high school (Mary McDonald) in 1909. By 2003–2004 the renovated high school building housed 4 year olds through grade 12. The 2004–2005 school year saw the consolidation of the Wakefield-Marenisco School District. The merging of the two communities ended the existence of the respective districts individual schools. The combined districts have approximately 300 students.
- Central School Elementary closed in 2000. In 2001 the elementary students moved into the high school building.
- Mary McDonald School established in 1909. It was demolished in 1974.

=== Wakefield Public Library ===
The Wakefield Public Library was opened to the public on February 4, 1935. It was originally located on the second floor of the City Hall building on Sunday Lake Street. It is now located at 401 Hancock Street. The dream for the library dates back to Oct 17, 1934 when a group of local citizens concerned about the literary heritage of their community decided to take action. They felt that a measurement of the cultural concerns of a community could be made through the literary pursuits of its citizens. The city of Wakefield made its first appropriation of $1,000 to lay the groundwork of the fine community facility we enjoy today. The Wakefield Public Library serves the City and Township of Wakefield. With help from the "Friends of the Library" it has received some needed renovations. In 2005, the children's section was totally remodeled followed by the "teen section" in 2006.

=== Public safety ===
- Wakefield Volunteer Fire Department.
- Gogebic County Sheriff's Department at 100 Iron Street, Bessemer, Michigan.
- Michigan State Police Post No. 87 at 100 Sunday Lake Street.

=== Healthcare facilities & nursing homes ===
- Gogebic County Medical Care Facility at 402 North Street is a 109-bed Nursing Home facility which provides extended-stay nursing care to seniors with varying levels of disabilities. It is owned and operated by the county government.
- Gogebic County Community Mental Health Authority at 103 West US 2 provides a complete range of services for all residents of Gogebic County. These services are for people with emotional disturbance or mental illness. In addition, services are available for persons with developmental disabilities and co-occurring substance abuse issues.
- KeenAgers Corporation at 303 Brotherton Street is a non-profit organization that offers assisted living and independent living to the elderly. The facility offers all meals and laundry service. KeenAgers was founded by the late Reverend Wilbert Staudenmaier.
- Sunset Manor at 200 East Pierce Street is a one-story independent living facility for the elderly and low income housing and operates on 30% of income for flat rate/rent and includes all utilities. It consists of 30 efficiency apartments and 1 bedrooms. It is run by the Wakefield Housing Commission under the Federal Housing Department (HUD).

=== Religion ===
- Grace Baptist Church at 512 Sunday Lake Street.
- Immaculate Conception Catholic Church at 407 Ascherman Street.
- All Saints Lutheran Church at 1202 Putnam Street.
- Wakefield Methodist Church at 706 Putnam Street.
- Calvary Baptist Church at 1201 Peters Street.

=== Community and Veterans Groups ===
- Wakefield Senior Citizen Center at 900 Pierce Street was established in the early 1950s. It was a church before it was utilized in its current role. Programs include senior issues such as healthcare, Medicare, eye care, diabetes, and nutrition. The Senior Center is involved in the Meals on Wheels program sponsored by Gogebic County.
- Rotary Club of Bessemer and Wakefield meets every Thursday at noon at the Keenager's facility.
- Wakefield Historical Society at 306 Sunday Lake Street. Collections include a "turn-of-the-century" collection, specializing in mining and lumbering.
- Veterans of Foreign Wars Post 9084 at 107 East US 2, on the south shore of Sunday Lake.
- American Legion Post 11 at 605 River Street.

=== Recreation and tourism ===
- Eddy Park & Campground is located on the north-northeastern shore of Sunday Lake. The park provides picnic, playground, and swimming areas and has two pavilions for gatherings. The park and campground is opened from Memorial Day weekend to the end of September. The modern campground has water, electric (20, 30, and 50 Amp), and sewer services.
- Indianhead Mountain Ski Resort is located west of the city at 500 Indianhead Mountain Road. The mountain provides a vertical drop of 638 feet (194 m) on 29 runs with 196 skiable acres and several trails up to a mile long. Summer activities include hiking, golf, and wildlife watching.
- American Power Boat Association (APBA) boat races. The City of Wakefield has hosted APBA boat races on several occasions. Badger State Outboard Association boat races were held on Sunday Lake from July 31, 2011, through August 8, 2011. Advertised by the Wakefield Chamber of Commerce as "Speed Week on Sunday Lake", APBA Outboard Nationals were held on Sunday Lake from July 27 through August 1, 2015. Nation Stock & J Class Boat Races were held July 22–26, 2019.

=== Media ===
Local newspapers and radio include:

- The Wakefield News-Bessemer Pick & Axe is published weekly on Wednesday at 405 Sunday Lake Street.
- The Ironwood Daily Globe is published Monday through Saturday and serves Gogebic and Ontonagon Counties in Michigan and Iron County, Wisconsin.
- WJMS AM 590 from Ironwood, Michigan
- WIMI FM 99.7 from Ironwood, Michigan
- WUPM FM 106.9 from Ironwood, Michigan

== Notable people ==
- Walter S. Goodland, Governor of Wisconsin, practiced law in Wakefield.
- Ernest J. Korpela, Wisconsin State Assemblyman, was born in Wakefield.
- Betty Ren Wright, award-winning writer of children’s fiction, was born in Wakefield.

== Transportation ==
=== Major highways ===
- US 2
- M-28
- CR 519

=== Bus service ===
- Indian Trails provides daily intercity bus service between St. Ignace and Ironwood, Michigan.

=== Trails ===
- State Line Trail

== Books ==
- Cox, Bruce K., Pioneers of Wakefield Michigan 1884–1900, Agogeebic Press, LLC, 2007.
- Cox, Bruce K., Headframes and Mine Shafts of the Gogebic Range, Volume 2, Bessemer-Ramsay-Wakefield, Agogeebic Press, LLC, 2000.
