= Bessemer Township, Michigan =

- Civil township
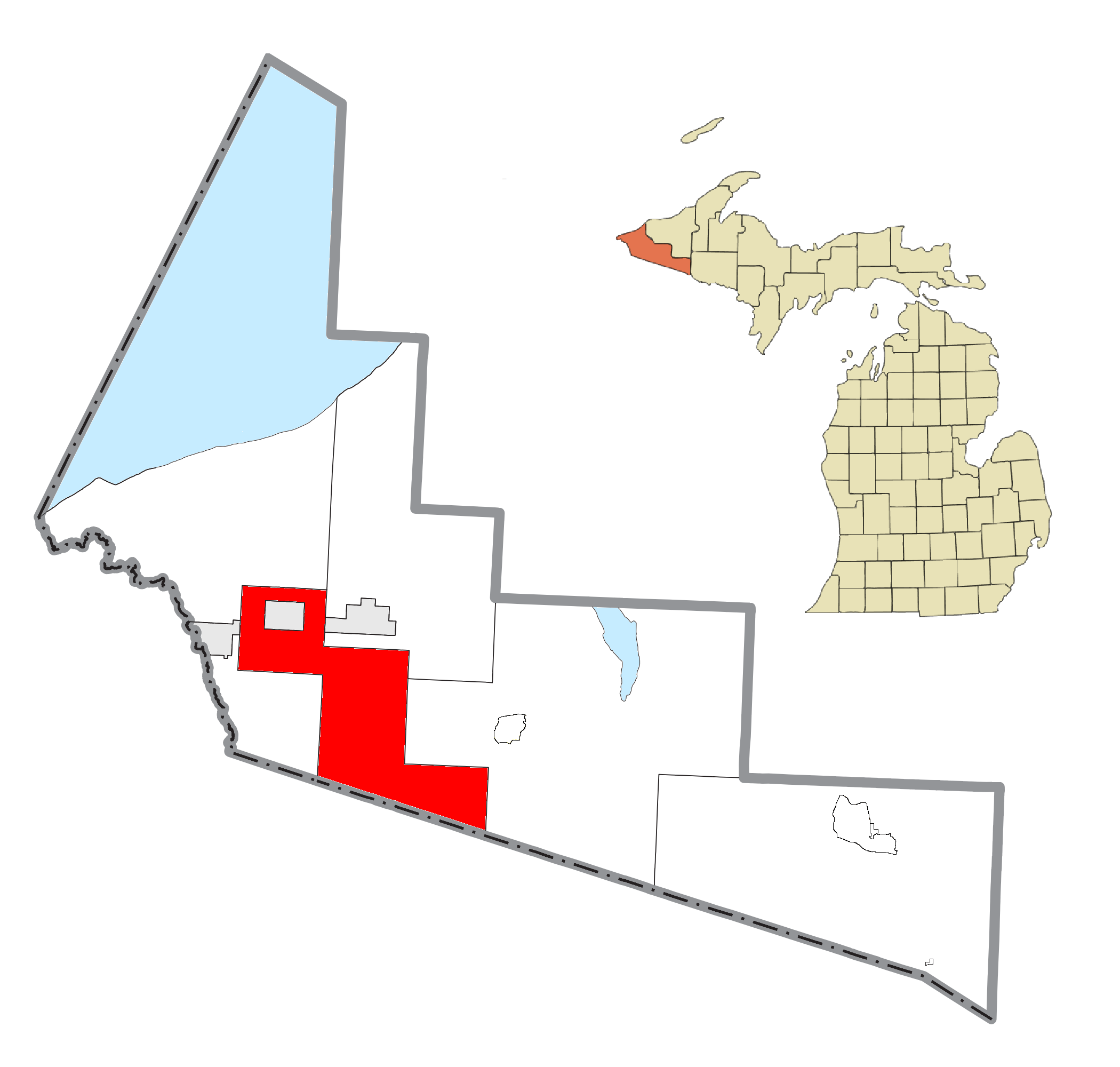
- Location within Gogebic County

- Location within the state of Michigan Bessemer Township (the United States)
- Coordinates: 46°25′14″N 89°59′51″W
- Country: United States
- State: Michigan
- County: Gogebic

Government
  - Supervisor: Jeffery Randall
  - Clerk: Debbie Janczak

Area
  - Total: 115.4 sq mi (298.9 km^{2})
  - Land: 113.9 sq mi (294.9 km^{2})
  - Water: 1.5 sq mi (4.0 km^{2})
- Elevation: 1,549 ft (472 m)

Population (2020)
  - Total: 1,135
  - Density: 11/sq mi (4.3/km^{2})
- Time zone: UTC-6 (Central (CST))
  - Summer (DST): UTC-5 (CDT)
- ZIP code(s): 49911 (Bessemer); 49947 (Marenisco); 49959 (Ramsay); 49968 (Wakefield)
- Area code: 906
- FIPS code: 26-07980
- GNIS feature ID: 1625929
- Website: Official website

Bessemer Township is a civil township of Gogebic County in the U.S. state of Michigan. As of 2020, its population was 1,135.

== Geography ==
According to the United States Census Bureau, the township has a total area of 115.4 square miles (299 km^{2}), of which 113.8 square miles (295 km^{2}) is land and 1.6 square miles (4.1 km^{2}) (1.35%) is water.

== Communities ==
- Anvil Location is a community established in 1886, associated with an iron mine, the Anvil Mine, operated by Newport Mining Company. Production at this mine spanned from 1887 to 1957, 70 years of production. It had a post office from 1918 to 1971.
- The City of Bessemer is situated within the township, but is administratively autonomous.
- Dunham was an unincorporated community centered on a station on the Chicago and Northwestern Railroad. There was a plant of the Ashland Iron and Steel Company here. It had a Post Office from 1902 until 1911.
- Harding Location borders the southern parameters of the township, a farming community. Although some of this land is still used for farming, it is small compared to past years.
- Puritan Location is the westernmost populated community, established in 1886. Its mine, the Ruby was operated by Oliver Mining Company and was the first of the major iron mines on the Gogebic Range to close in 1941. It had the largest public school edifice in the township, constructed in 1920 and continued operating through the school year of 1958–59. It had a Post Office from 1910 until 1953.
- Ramsay is an unincorporated community and census-designated place within the township at 46°28′13″N 89°59′48″W. It is on the Black River just south of U.S. Highway 2 a few miles west of Wakefield and a few miles east of Bessemer.

== Keystone Arch Bridge ==
The Keystone Arch Bridge in Ramsay cost $48,322 (equivalent to $1.52 million in 2024). The Chicago & Northwestern Railway built it in 1891, using limestone quarried in Kaukauna, Wisconsin. It is 45 feet (14 m) long, 44 feet (13 m) wide, and 57 feet (17 m) tall with wing walls of 50 feet (15 m). Stone arch bridges are a rarity in Michigan.

== Demographics ==
As of the census of 2010, there were 1,176 people. By 2020, its population was 1,135.
