= Marenisco, Michigan =

- Census-designated place (CDP) & unincorporated community
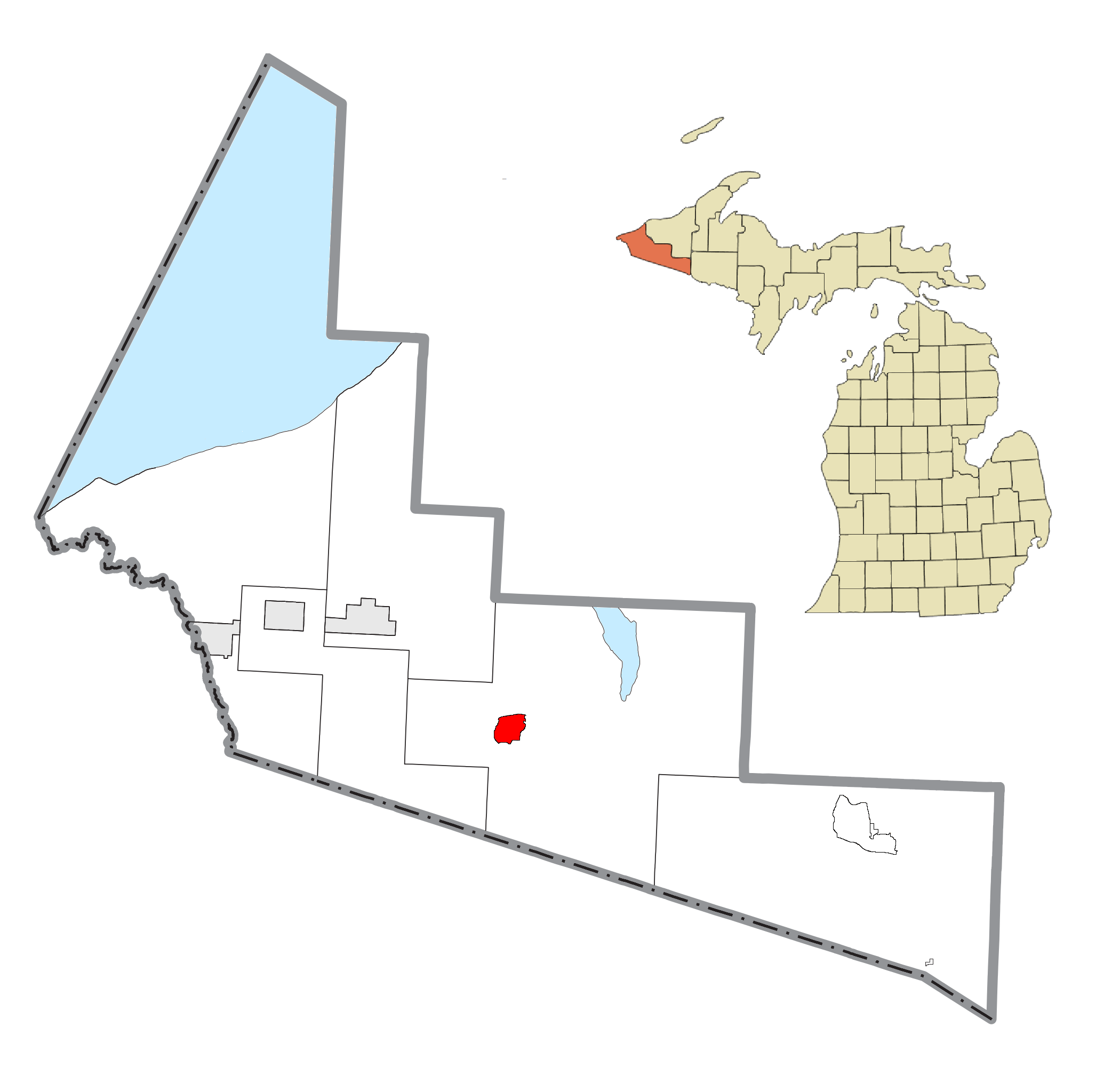
- Location within Gogebic County

- Location within the state of Michigan Marenisco (the United States)
- Coordinates: 46°22′34″N 89°41′46″W
- Country: United States
- State: Michigan
- County: Gogebic
- Township: Marenisco

Area
  - Total: 3.45 sq mi (8.93 km^{2})
  - Land: 3.45 sq mi (8.93 km^{2})
  - Water: 0 sq mi (0.00 km^{2})
- Elevation: 1,515 ft (462 m)

Population (2020)
  - Total: 179
  - Density: 51.9/sq mi (20.05/km^{2})
- Time zone: UTC-5 (Eastern (EST))
  - Summer (DST): UTC-4 (EDT)
- ZIP code(s): 49947
- Area code: 906
- FIPS code: 26-51540
- GNIS feature ID: 1620705

Marenisco is an unincorporated community and census-designated place (CDP) in Marenisco Township, Gogebic County, Michigan, in the United States. As of the 2020 census, Marenisco had a population of 179. The name of the community and the township was formed by combining the first three letters from Mary Enid Scott, the wife of E. H. Scott, a timber producer.

The community is located in the western part of Marenisco Township, in the western part of Michigan's Upper Peninsula. U.S. Route 2 runs along the northern edge of the community, leading east 27 miles (43 km) to Watersmeet and west 13 miles (21 km) to Wakefield. Ironwood, Michigan, at the Wisconsin state line, is 26 miles (42 km) to the west on US 2. State highway M-64 passes through the center of Marenisco, leading south 9 miles (14 km) to the Wisconsin border.

The community of Marenisco was listed as a newly organized census-designated place for the 2010 census, meaning it now has officially defined boundaries and population statistics for the first time. According to the United States Census Bureau, the Marenisco CDP has an area of 3.4 square miles (8.9 km^{2}), all of it land. The community is bounded to the east by the Presque Isle River, which flows to Lake Superior in northeastern Gogebic County.

== Demographics ==
Historical population
Census	Pop.	Note	%±
2020	179		—
U.S. Decennial Census
