= Bessemer, Michigan =

- City
- City of Bessemer
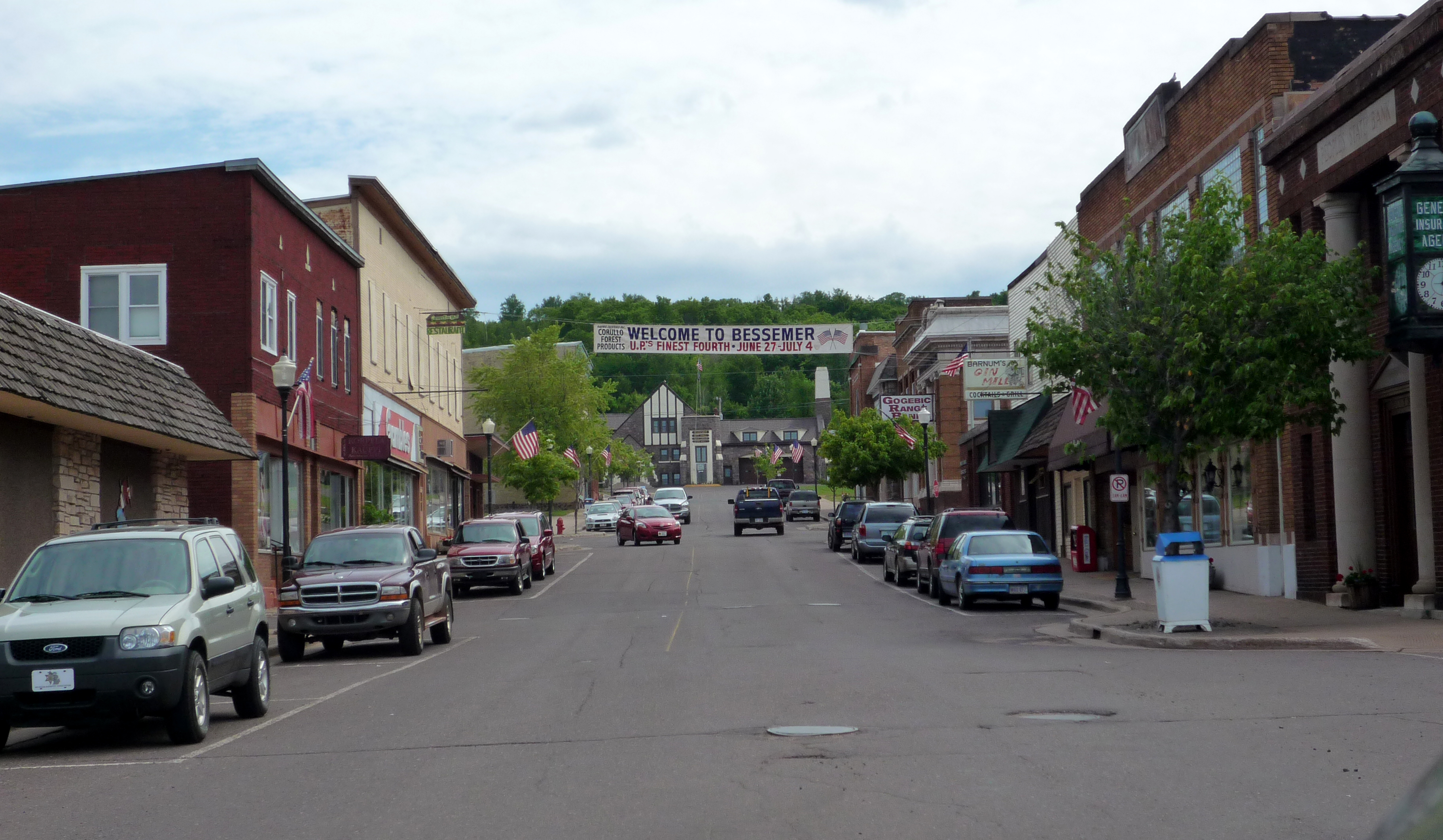
- Downtown Bessemer along S. Sophie Street

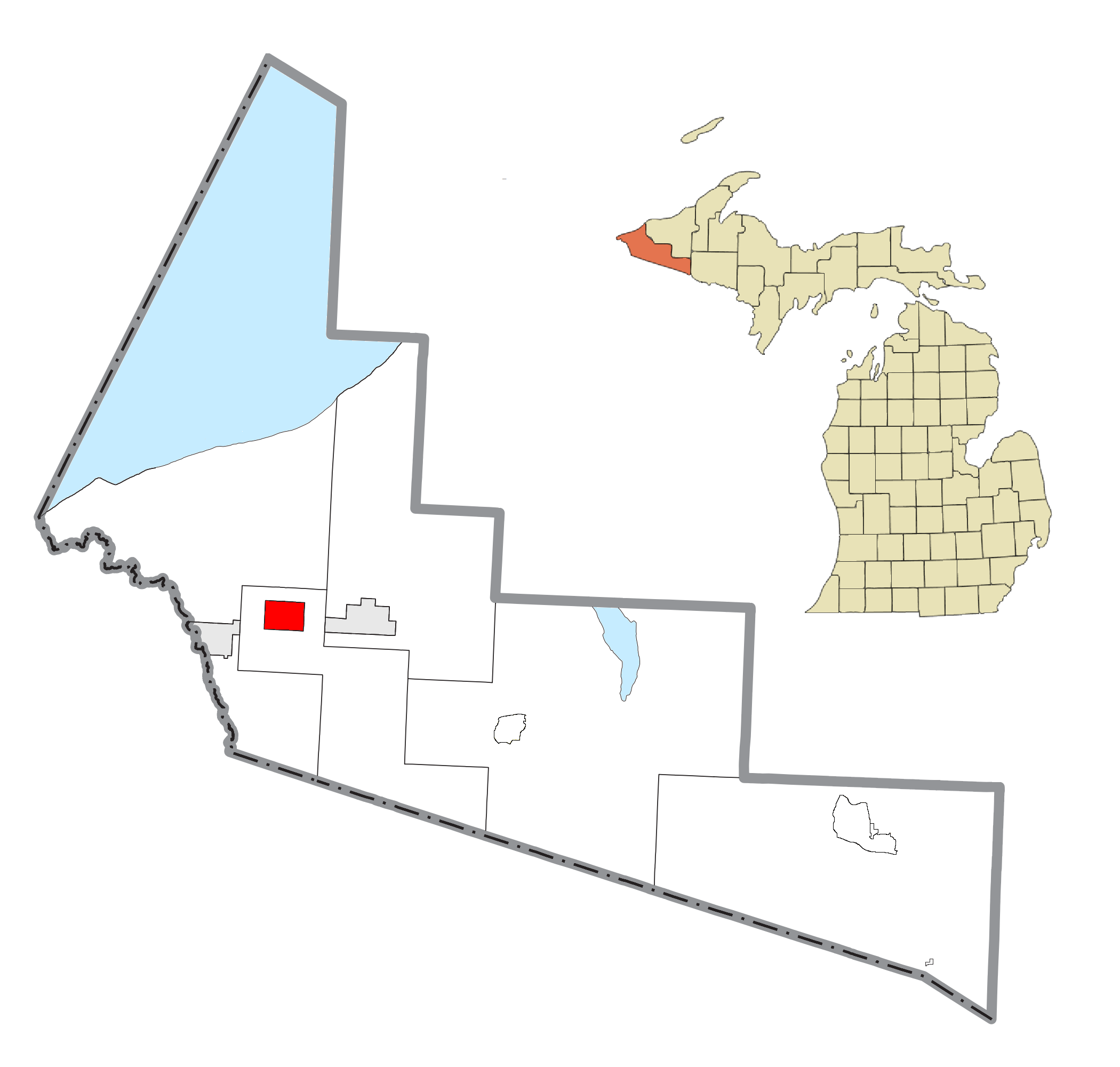
- Location within Gogebic County

- Location within the state of Michigan Location within the United States
- Coordinates: 46°28′41″N 90°03′05″W
- Country: United States
- State: Michigan
- County: Gogebic
- Settled: 1880
- Platted: 1884
- Incorporated: 1887 (village); 1889 (city)

Government
  - Type: Council–manager
  - Mayor: Adam Zak
  - Manager: Vacant

Area
  - Total: 5.50 sq mi (14.24 km^{2})
  - Land: 5.50 sq mi (14.24 km^{2})
  - Water: 0 sq mi (0.00 km^{2})
- Elevation: 1,424 ft (434 m)

Population (2020)
  - Total: 1,805
  - Density: 328.3/sq mi (126.74/km^{2})
- Time zone: UTC-6 (Central (CST))
  - Summer (DST): UTC-5 (CDT)
- ZIP code(s): 49911
- Area code: 906
- FIPS code: 26-07960
- GNIS feature ID: 0621184
- Website: Official website

Bessemer is a city in the U.S. state of Michigan. As of the 2020 census, the city population was 1,805. It is the county seat of Gogebic County.

The city is surrounded by Bessemer Township, but the two are administered autonomously. It is on U.S. Route 2 with Ironwood to the west and Wakefield to the east. The Big Powderhorn and Snowriver ski resorts are located within a few miles of Bessemer. Cross-country skiing and snowmobiling are also very popular in this area, due to lake-effect snow influenced by nearby Lake Superior; the area is often referred to as "Big Snow Country." Recreational opportunities in the summer months include Bluff Valley Park, the scenic Black River Falls, and access to the Iron Belle Trail.

== History ==
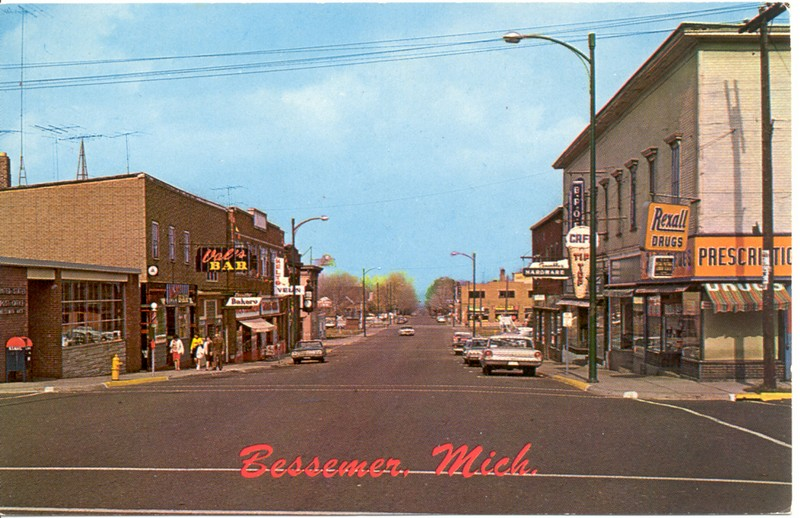
Vintage picture of Downtown Bessemer (Sophie Street)

In 1880, a hunter and trapper Richard Langford, discovered iron ore under an overturned birch tree. However, Captain N. D. Moore is credited with disclosing the ore which led to the development of the Colby property. Mining began in 1883. By 1884, the Milwaukee Lake Shore and Western Railroad (later the Chicago and Northwestern) was being built from Antigo, WI to Ashland, WI by way of the new mines. The railroad company plotted the town of Bessemer in 1884. On June 4, 1886 Gogebic County was separated from Ontonagon County. In March 1887, 360 voting members assembled and voted to organize the village of Bessemer. In the same year Gogebic County was officially created by the Michigan Legislature. Also in the year Bessemer and Ironwood called an election to see which city would be the county seat and also have the Gogebic County Courthouse. Ironwood men traveling to Bessemer to vote were made drunk and the train did not stop at the voting site. Ironwood lost and Bessemer gained the county seat. From 1884 to December 31, 1958, a period of seventy-five years, the iron ore shipment from all of Gogebic County totaled over 245 million tons. In 1966 the last mine in Bessemer, the Peterson Mine, closed. Many left the area to work in car factories in Kenosha, and the local economy underwent a serious decline.

Bessemer is named for Sir Henry Bessemer (1813-1898), English inventor of steel manufacturing.

== Government ==
Bessemer is operated by an elected 5-member city council with day-to-day operations run by an appointed city manager. Staff also consists of administrative staff, public works department, and library staff. Bessemer also belongs to the Gogebic Range Water Authority.

City Council

- Mayor Peter Tacconelli
- Mayor Pro-Tem Mark Movrich
- Councilperson Adam Zak
- Councilperson Linda Nelson
- Councilperson Mark Serwe

City Manager

- Mandy Lake (November 12, 2024 - )
- Jennifer Adams (2022 - 2024)
- Charly Loper (2016 - 2022)

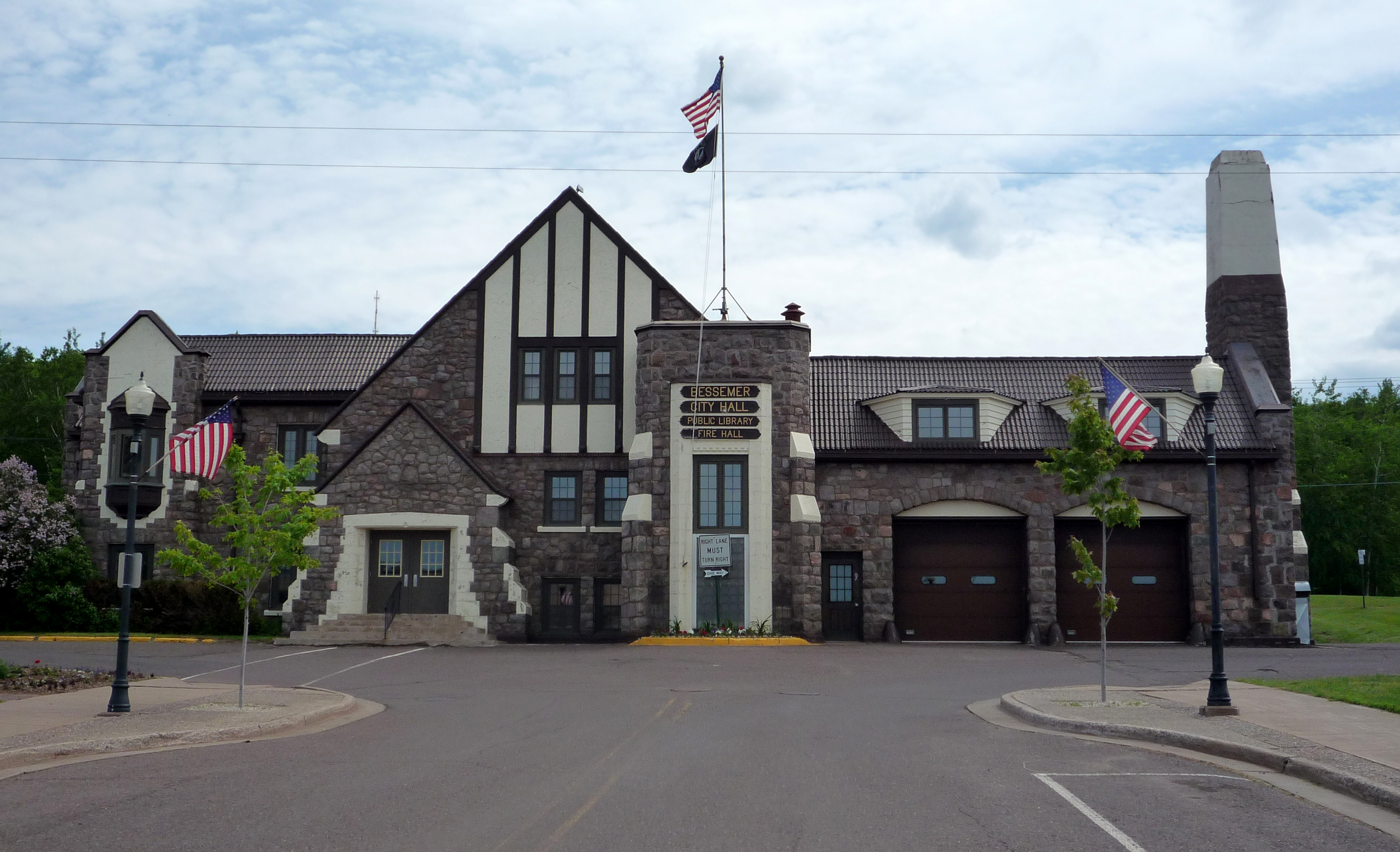
Bessemer City Hall, Public Library and Fire Hall.

== Geography ==
According to the United States Census Bureau, the city has a total area of 5.47 square miles (14.17 km^{2}), all land. Majority of Bessemer is situated on the north side of Colby Hill and the city consists of many hills and valleys.

== Demographics ==
Historical population
Census	Pop.	Note	%±
1890	2,566		—
1900	3,911		52.4%
1910	4,583		17.2%
1920	5,482		19.6%
1930	4,035		−26.4%
1940	4,080		1.1%
1950	3,509		−14.0%
1960	3,304		−5.8%
1970	2,805		−15.1%
1980	2,553		−9.0%
1990	2,272		−11.0%
2000	2,148		−5.5%
2010	1,905		−11.3%
2020	1,805		−5.2%
U.S. Decennial Census

=== 2020 census ===
As of the 2020 census, Bessemer had a population of 1,805. The median age was 48.2 years. 17.5% of residents were under the age of 18 and 23.9% of residents were 65 years of age or older. For every 100 females there were 104.0 males, and for every 100 females age 18 and over there were 104.5 males age 18 and over.

0.0% of residents lived in urban areas, while 100.0% lived in rural areas.

There were 877 households in Bessemer, of which 19.7% had children under the age of 18 living in them. Of all households, 36.5% were married-couple households, 26.8% were households with a male householder and no spouse or partner present, and 27.5% were households with a female householder and no spouse or partner present. About 41.9% of all households were made up of individuals and 18.0% had someone living alone who was 65 years of age or older.

There were 1,109 housing units, of which 20.9% were vacant. The homeowner vacancy rate was 4.0% and the rental vacancy rate was 6.5%.

Racial composition as of the 2020 census
Race	Number	Percent
White	1,686	93.4%
Black or African American	12	0.7%
American Indian and Alaska Native	14	0.8%
Asian	3	0.2%
Native Hawaiian and Other Pacific Islander	0	0.0%
Some other race	3	0.2%
Two or more races	87	4.8%
Hispanic or Latino (of any race)	28	1.6%

== News/media ==
=== Newspapers ===
- Ironwood Daily Globe
- Wakefield News/Bessemer Pick & Axe

=== Area radio station coverage ===
- WIMI 99.7 FM (Classic Rock)- Ironwood
- WJMS 590 AM (Talk/Country)- Ironwood
- WUPM 106.9 FM (Top 40/Variety)- Ironwood
- WHRY 1450 AM/102.9 FM (Oldies)- Hurley
- WRJO 94.5 FM (Oldies)- Eagle River
- WJJH 96.7 FM (Classic Rock)- Ashland
- WBSZ 93.3 FM (Country)- Ashland
- WUPY 101.1 FM (Country)- Ontonagon
- WUWS 90.9 FM (Wisconsin Public Radio)- Ashland
- WHBM 90.3 FM (Wisconsin Public Radio)- Park Falls

=== Local television station coverage ===
- WLUC TV 6 (Marquette)-NBC/FOX
- WNMU (Marquette)-PBS
- KDLH (Duluth)-CBS
- KBJR (Duluth)-NBC
- WDIO (Duluth)-ABC
- KQDS-TV (Duluth)-FOX

== Transportation ==
- US Highway 2 is the Upper Peninsula's longest US Highway, stretching from St. Ignace to neighboring Ironwood.
- County Road 513 (Moore Street/Black River Road) begins in Bessemer at junction with US 2 and runs 15 miles (24 km) north to Black River Harbor on the shore of Lake Superior. A section of the road is designated the Black River National Forest Scenic Byway.
- County Road 200 (Old County Road) begins at the southwest end of Bessemer and travels west to Ironwood.

Indian Trails provides daily intercity bus service between St. Ignace and Ironwood, while Gogebic County operates a small public bus system, the Gogebic County Transit Authority.

Commercial air service is available at the Gogebic-Iron County Airport (IWD) north of Ironwood.

== Notable people ==
- Otto Binder, science fiction and comic book author (Mary Marvel, Legion of Super-Heroes, and Supergirl); born in Bessemer
- Kevin Borseth, women's basketball coach at The University of Wisconsin-Green Bay; born in Bessemer
- Jay W. Johnson, U.S. congressmen for Wisconsin's 8th congressional district; born in Bessemer
- Arthur Redner, halfback for Fielding H. Yost's 1901 "Point-a-Minute" football team; lived in Bessemer
- Al Rossi, Olympic bronze medalist in rowing at the 1952 Summer Olympics; born in Bessemer
- Richard A. Sofio, Michigan state representative and educator; born in Bessemer.
