= 1994 Michigan elections =

- November 8, 1994

The 1994 Michigan elections were held in the U.S. state of Michigan on November 8, 1994. The state primary was held on August 3.

== Federal ==
=== U.S. Senate ===
Incumbent Democratic senator Donald Riegle did not seek re-election. Republican nominee Spencer Abraham won election, defeating Democratic nominee Bob Carr.

=== U.S. House of Representatives ===
Republicans gained one seat, resulting in a 9–7 Democratic majority in Michigan's U.S. House delegation.

== Executive ==
=== Governor and lieutenant governor ===
Incumbent Republican governor John Engler won re-election, defeating Democratic nominee Howard Wolpe.

=== Secretary of state ===
Incumbent Democratic secretary of state Richard H. Austin lost re-election to Republican nominee Candice Miller.

=== Attorney general ===
Incumbent Democratic attorney general Frank J. Kelley won re-election, defeating Republican nominee John Smietanka.

== Legislature ==
=== Senate ===
Republicans maintained a 22–16 majority over the Democrats in the state Senate.

=== Senate special election ===
There was a special election for the Michigan Senate in the 32nd district in 1994. The special primary was on March 15 and the special general was on April 26. It was triggered when incumbent Republican State Sen. Vern Ehlers was elected to the U.S. House of Representatives in a special election in December 1993. The special election was won by Republican Glenn Steil Sr.

=== House of Representatives ===
Republicans gained one seat in the state House, which had previously had an even 55–55 split of Democrats and Republicans, resulting in a 56–54 Republican majority.

=== House of Representatives special election ===
In 1994, there were special elections in three districts of the Michigan House of Representatives: the 43rd district, the 69th district, and the 110th district. The special primaries were on March 15 and the special general elections were on April 26. In January, incumbent Democrats Charlie Harrison and David Hollister of the 43rd district and 69th district, respectively, resigned to become mayors. In the 110th district, incumbent Democrat Stephen Shepich resigned in January amidst scandal. The three special elections were all won by Democrats, Hubert Price Jr. (43rd district), Lynne Martinez (69th district), and Paul Tesanovich (110th district).

== Judiciary ==
=== Supreme Court ===
There were two full terms on the Michigan Supreme Court up for election in 1994. Incumbent Democratic justice Conrad L. Mallett Jr. sought re-election, while incumbent Republican justice Robert P. Griffin retired. Mallett won re-election and Republican Elizabeth Weaver won the open seat. The election maintained the previous partisan makeup of the court, 3 Republicans, 3 Democrats, and 1 independent.

== Michigan State Board of Education and University boards ==
=== Michigan State Board of Education ===
Incumbent Democrat Gumecindo Salas sought re-election, while incumbent Democrat Annetta Miller decided not to run for re-election. Salas was defeated, and two Republicans, Clark Durant and Sharon Wise, won election. This resulted in a 6–2 Republican majority on the board.

=== Michigan State University Board of Trustees ===
Incumbent Democrat Joel Ferguson sought re-election, while incumbent Democrat Barbara Sawyer-Koch decided not to. Ferguson was defeated, and the election was won by Republican Donald Nugent and Democrat Colleen McNamara.

=== University of Michigan Board of Regents ===
Incumbent Democrats Paul W. Brown and James L. Waters sought re-election. They were defeated by Republicans Andrea Fischer and Dan Horning. This resulted in an even 4–4 split of Democrats and Republicans on the board.

=== Wayne State University Board of Governors ===
Incumbent Democrat Leon Atchison sought re-election, while incumbent Democrat Robert Naftaly decided not to. The election was won by Atchison and Diane Dunaskiss.

== Ballot initiatives ==
=== State ballot proposals ===
There was one state ballot proposal voted up on March 15, 1994. Proposal A, which sought to reform school finance, raise sales tax, and limit property tax increases was passed into law.

There were four state ballot proposals voted up on November 8, 1994. Proposal A, which sought to draft a new state constitution, was rejected. Proposal B, which banned criminal defendants which plead guilty or no contest from appealing, was passed. Proposal C, which sought to lower auto insurance rates, was rejected. Proposal P, which sought to increase state park funding, was passed.
