= Stephen Day =

Stephen Day may refer to:

- Stephen Day (British politician) (born 1948), Conservative Party politician in the United Kingdom, and former Member of Parliament (MP)
- Stephen A. Day (1882–1950), US lawyer and member of the House of Representatives, 1941–1945
- Stephen Day (singer)
- Steve Day, comedian

== See also ==
- Steven E. Day, United States Coast Guard rear admiral
- Stephen Daye Sr. (c. 1594–1668), first British North American printer
