= 25-foot Transportable Port Security Boat =

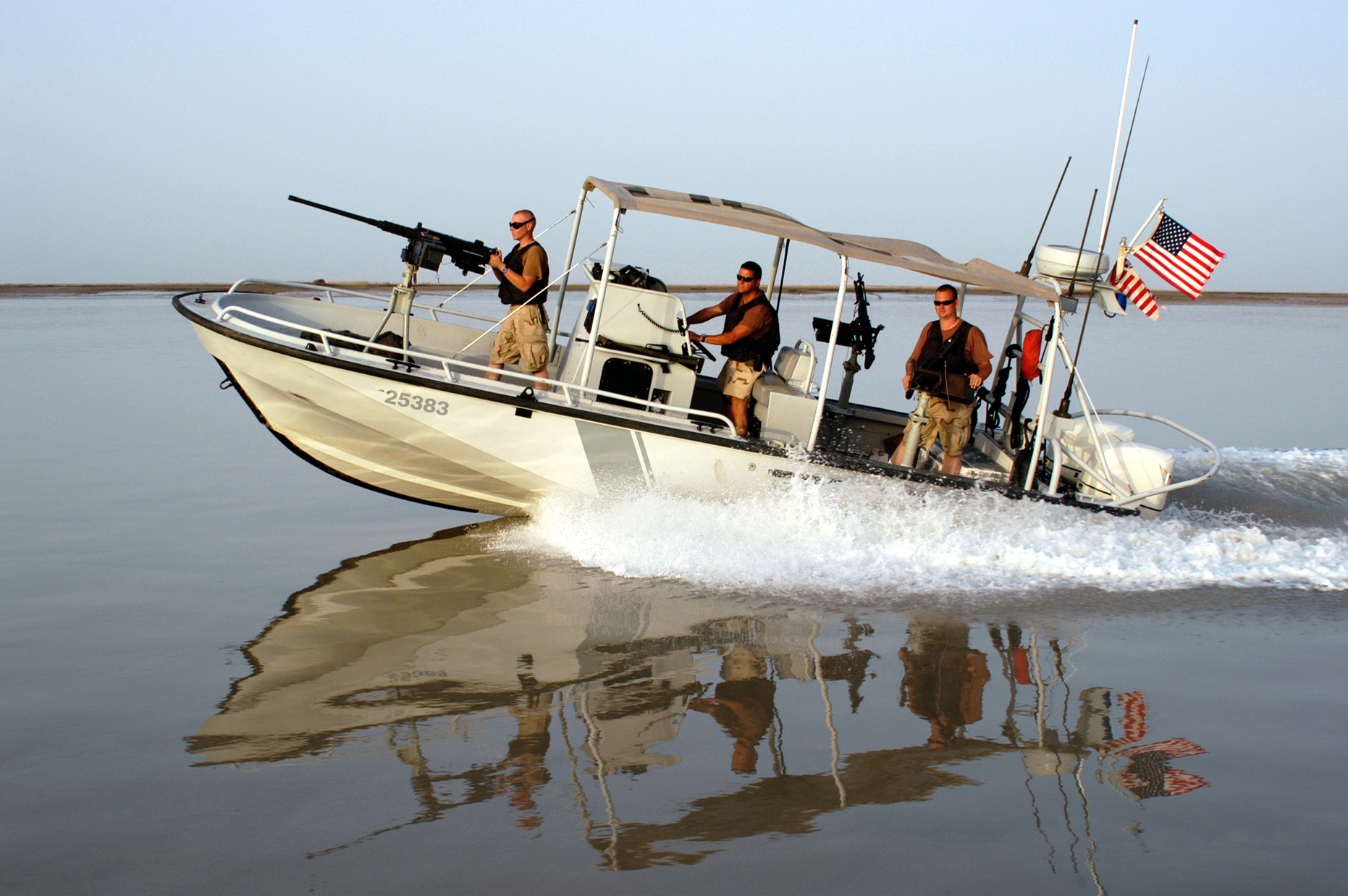
- Transportable Port Security Boat (TPSB)

Class overview
- Name: Transportable Port Security Boat
- Builders: Boston Whaler
- Operators: United States Coast Guard
- Preceded by: 22-foot Raider boat
- Succeeded by: 32 ft Transportable Port Security Boat (TPSB)
- In service: 1997-present

General characteristics
- Length: 7.5 m (24 ft 7 in)
- Beam: 2.4 m (7 ft 10 in)
- Draught: 0.991 m (3 ft 3.0 in)
- Propulsion: 2 × Evinrude outboard engines, 175 hp (130 kW) each
- Speed: 50 knots (58 mph; 93 km/h) maximum
- Armament: 2 × M240B 7.62mm machine gun 1 x M2HB .50-caliber machine gun

The 25 ft (8 m) Transportable Port Security Boat (TPSB): (AKA The Guardian) is a twin outboard motor, open deck, all weather, high performance, moderately-armed platform capable of operating in inner harbor/near shore environments in light sea conditions. It was first built in FY97 by Boston Whaler in Edgewater, Florida, for the US Coast Guard, Maintenance and Logistic Command. The 25 ft (8 m) TPSB is designed and configured to support Port Security Units as an inshore/harbor surface interdiction response asset in accordance with Required Operational Capabilities (ROC) and Projected Operational Environment (POE) for Coast Guard Port Security Units (PSU), COMDTINST 3501.49 (series). The basic design is based on the standard Boston Whaler 25 ft (8 m) Guardian hull, customized to functionally suit the TPSB mission requirements. The basic craft arrangements consist of a centrally positioned control console and leaning post with an open work deck and low non-obstructive gunwales. The TPSB is outfitted as a military gunboat with three (3) hardened weapon positions: (1) forward .50 caliber (12.7 mm) tri-pod, (2) gunwale - mounted 7.62 mm M240B Machine Gun pipe pedestals, port and starboard.

== See also ==
- Equipment of the United States Coast Guard
- Response boat-medium
- USCG Defender class boat
