= Battle of Al Faw (2003) =

Engagement of the Iraq War

Coordinates: 29.9753°N 48.4725°E

- Part of the 2003 invasion of Iraq
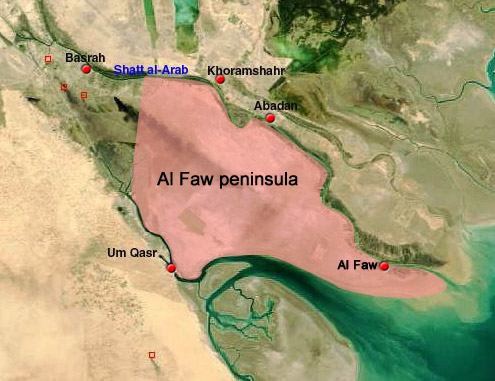
- Map of Iraq's Al-Faw Peninsula, along the Iran–Iraq border
Date	20–24 March 2003 (4 days)
Location	Al-Faw, Iraq
Result	Coalition victory
Territorial changes	Seizure of the Al-Faw Peninsula, including Umm Qasr, by the Coalition of the Willing

Belligerents
United Kingdom; United States; Australia; Poland	Iraq

Strength
~3,500 men	1,000+ men

Casualties and losses
19 killed (15 British, 4 U.S.)	150+ killed 440 captured

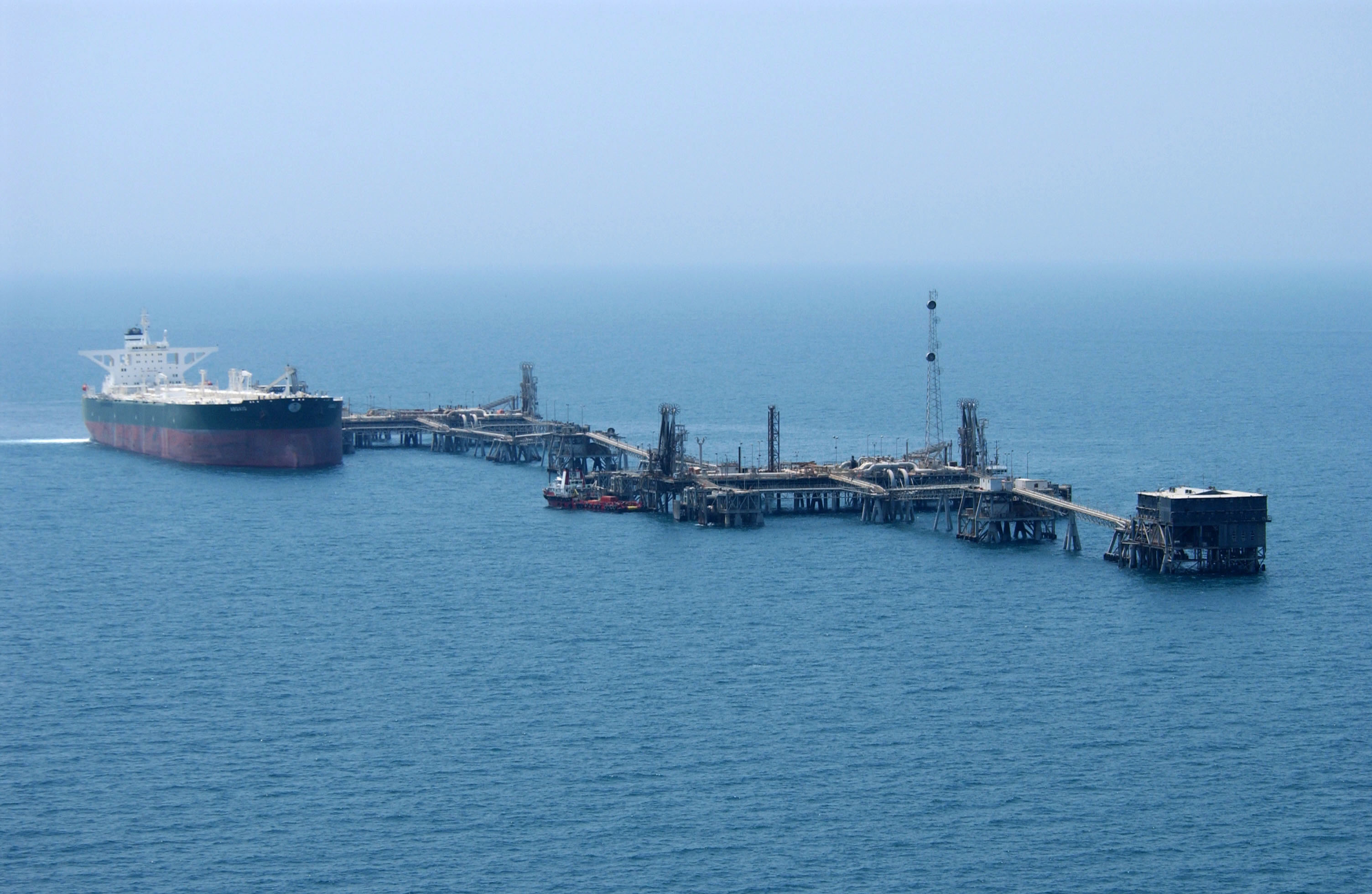
Mina al-Bakr Oil Terminal, 29 June 2003

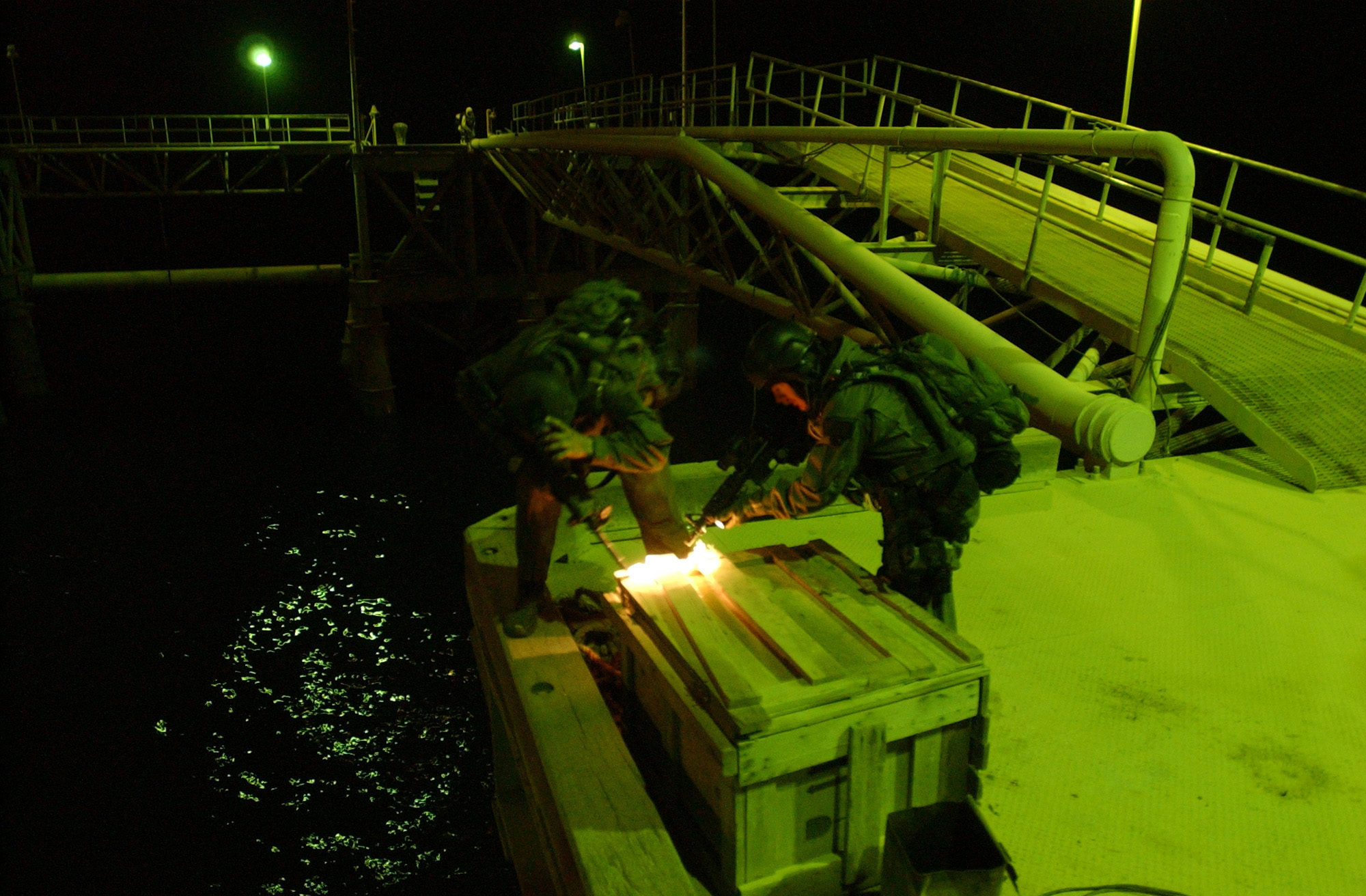
Operators from Naval Special Warfare inspect a shipping container at Mina al-Bakr Oil Terminal, 21 March 2003

The Battle of Al Faw began on 20 March 2003 and continued for four days, as part of the 2003 invasion of Iraq.

One of the initial objectives of the Coalition was to capture every GOPLAT (gas and oil platform) in the Al-Faw Peninsula before they could be sabotaged or destroyed by the Iraqi military. Doing so would also deny Iraq the ability to cause another ecological disaster, as it had done with the Kuwait oil fires and the Persian Gulf oil spill in 1991. By seizing the country's coast, the Coalition would also ensure a quicker takeover of Iraqi oil production.

The 3 Commando Brigade of the British Armed Forces would also capture Umm Qasr at the same time, so that Umm Qasr Port—the only deep water port in Iraq—could be used to bring in heavy military supplies once Khawr Abd Allah was cleared by the Mine Counter Measures Task Group. The 15th Marine Expeditionary Unit of the United States Marine Corps was placed under the command of the 3 Commando Brigade in order to provide the necessary force for capturing both targets.

== Order of battle ==
The following list details the strength of the Coalition (the United Kingdom, the United States, Australia, and Poland) during this operation.

- 3 Commando Brigade, Royal Marines
  - 40 Commando, Royal Marines
  - 42 Commando, Royal Marines
  - 29th Commando Regiment Royal Artillery
  - 59 Independent Commando Squadron Royal Engineers
  - 131 Independent Commando Squadron Royal Engineers
  - 15th Marine Expeditionary Unit, United States Marine Corps
  - SEAL Teams 3, 8 and 10, Navy SBT 22
  - PSU 311 and 313, United States Coast Guard
  - USS Firebolt PC-10
  - USS Chinook PC-9
- Fleet support:
  - HMS Ark Royal (aircraft carrier & helicopter transport)
  - HMS Ocean (amphibious assault ship)
  - HMS Richmond (naval gunfire support)
  - HMS Marlborough (naval gunfire support)
  - HMS Sutherland (Naval Escort)
  - HMS Chatham (naval gunfire support)
  - HMS Ledbury (Mine hunter)
  - HMS Bangor (Mine hunter)
  - HMS Sandown (Mine hunter)
  - HMS Brocklesby (Mine hunter)
  - RFA Sir Galahad (transport)
  - USS Valley Forge (command and control)
  - USS Rushmore (transport)
  - ORP Kontradmirał Xawery Czernicki (logistical support)
  - HMAS Kanimbla (Command and control & logistical support)
  - HMAS Anzac (naval gunfire support)
  - USAV Mechanicsville (Landing ship)
- Aviation support:
  - USS Constellation
    - F-14 Tomcat (combat air patrol)
    - F/A-18 Hornet fighter-bombers
    - MH-53 Pave Low (sniper overwatch for land assault units)
    - HH-60H Seahawk (sniper overwatch for GOPLAT assault units)
  - A-10 Thunderbolt II (close air support)
  - AC-130U Spectre gunship
  - AH-1 Cobra attack helicopters
- Royal Air Force
  - CH-47 Chinook Helicopters
    - 18 Sqn
    - Tactical Supply Wing (TSW)
    - Joint Helicopter Support Unit (JHSU)
  - Puma HC1 helicopters
    - 33 Sqn
- Royal Navy Fleet Air Arm
  - Sea Harrier
  - Sea King Mk7 AEW
    - 849 Sqn
  - Sea King HC4
    - 845 Sqn
  - Lynx Mk7
    - 847 Sqn

== Background ==
The main objective for the coalition was to capture the Khawr Abd Allah waterway on the al-Faw peninsula, allowing relief vessels to deliver emergency aid and equipment. During the Gulf War, the Iraqis had mined the waterway and the northern Gulf. Coalition commanders suspected they would do the same again, so the coalition dispatched minesweepers to clear the areas of mines. The eastern side of the waterway was part of the al-Faw peninsula and Iraqi-occupied, the mine-sweepers were not heavily armed or armoured and would be vulnerable to the Iraqi defenses on both the bank and from the rest of the al-Faw peninsula, the waterway was shallow and its canals were dry so large warships could not provide an effective defence for the mine-sweepers. So it became necessary for the coalition commanders that the eastern bank of the Khawr Abd Allah waterway and the al-Faw peninsula had to be secured; additionally, the docks at Umm Qasr could only be used safely if the al-Faw peninsula was secured.

Another important objective on the al-Faw peninsula was the Iraqi oil infrastructure, coalition analysis of the major Iraqi southern oilfields, the routes of the pipelines and locations of the pumping-stations revealed that they all culminated in the al-Faw peninsula where 90% of Iraq's oil was exported through the peninsula via two gas and oil platforms just a few miles off the al-faw coast.

=== Plan ===
The plan for the assault and eventual capture of the al-Faw peninsula was that US Navy SEALs from SEAL Team 3 would make the initial assault on the MMS (monitoring and metering station) and the pipelines that allowed Iraq to export its oil from the southern fields to the Gulf, landing via 8 MH-53 helicopters. After 30 minutes, the Royal Marines would take over whilst the SEALs would depart. The main objective for 800 marines from 40 Commando as part of the brigades objective was to secure the MMS, B and C company and the MSG (Maneuver Support Group) would land by helicopters (that had previously taken in the SEALs), on the eastern bank of the Khawr Abd Allah waterway to secure it and then set up a defensive perimeter around the MMS. An hour later, A and D company would be flown in by Chinook and Sea King helicopters and the rest of 40 commando would then move out and capture the rest of the peninsula and the town of Al-Faw. 3 ships from the Royal Navy and 1 from the Royal Australian Navy were assigned to provide fire support, as well as an AC-130.

800+ commandos of 42 Commando, would land via 37 RAF CH-47, Royal Navy Sea King and US Marine Corps CH-46 helicopters, and north of 40 commando to create a blocking force against Iraqi forces to the north, they would be led in by USMC Cobras, teams of US troops were attached to the Commandos to liaise with US air support. A B-52 bomber would drop 16 JDAM's on Iraqi positions 17 minutes before the SEAL insertion, a flight of A-10s and an AC-130 gunship would also be in support, predator drones provided surveillance. The Royal Marines BRF (Brigade Reconnaissance Force) would also deploy to support 42 commando, a few minutes after 40 commando landed, Royal Marine artillery and British Army self-propelled guns would fire on Iraqi artillery positions on the peninsula

According to coalition intelligence, The Iraqi 6th Armoured Division equipped with 100 T-55 tanks were stationed to defend the approaches to Basra and could be sent to intervene, some of its units were based on the peninsula itself and were just a few hours away from the coalition objectives, at least 150 aircraft were ready to launch support operations against them.

== Assault ==
=== 20 March ===
Following days of bad weather, the assault on Al Faw was set for 2200 hours (local time) on 20 March 2003, US gunships and fighter-bombers attacked the known Iraqi positions on the peninsula in a short bombardment before the operation. The B-52 arrived on time and they released their bombs on various Iraqi bunkers, trenches and dugouts around the oil facilities on the al-Faw peninsula, 5 minutes later A-10s arrived to destroy any anti aircraft guns or missiles, however they couldn't see their targets due to the dust cloud created from the JDAMs, so they went into a holding pattern until it cleared. A and D company of SEALs and other special forces units would assault on the MSS and the pipelines was successful, after a brief firefight they killed 1 Iraqi soldier and captured 13 more.

At the same time B and C company would commence air and sea landings, securing the gas and oil platforms out at sea. Special Boat Team 22 inserted SEAL Teams 8 and 10 to capture the Mina Al Bakr Oil Terminal and Polish GROM commandos captured the Khor Al-Amaya Oil Terminal. 32 Iraqi prisoners were also captured. Explosive ordnance disposal were then landed on the platforms to search for and remove explosive booby traps and demolition charges. After the terminals had been cleared of Iraqi troops, explosives, and weapons, Port Security Units 311 and 313 arrived to take control of the facilities.

An AC-130 guided in the RAF Chinook helicopters carrying the Commando's from 40 Commando, the helicopter insertion was successful and the Commandos secured the MSS and the pipelines, whilst assaulting buildings at the MSS, the Commandos killed 2 Iraqi soldiers. Resistance was light: D company came under sporadic fire from an Iraqi Bunker, two 2000- and 500-pound bombs released from an F-18 as well as 40 mm and 105 mm shells from an AC-130 destroyed the bunker. The Iraqi POW's captured by the SEALs were given over to the commandos. The MSG moved out to the town of al-Faw to take control of its access points, on the way, they attacked two Iraqi-occupied trenches and a gatehouse. The firefight lasted for an hour, eventually securing the position. With the support of the AC-130, the MSG killed 8 Iraqi soldiers and captured 25. There were still a further 200 Iraqi soldiers in other trenches and they began calling in mortars on the MSS, AC-130 gunfire silenced the mortars and demoralised the Iraqis; B company was locked in a sporadic firefight with an Iraqi bunker, which they eventually cleared, whilst A company assaulted an Iraqi-occupied trench, bunker and mortar position with AC-130 support, killing the occupants. D company neutralized another Iraqi bunker with naval gunfire; without taking any casualties, 40 Commando took over 200 Iraqi prisoners.

A second assault by 42 Commando followed at 2225 hours. The second assault was preceded by artillery and naval bombardment, the artillery fire came from three British and one US artillery batteries positioned on Bubiyan Island, the naval component from HMS Richmond, HMS Marlborough, HMS Chatham and HMAS Anzac. The Marines were preceded by USMC AH-1 Cobra helicopters gunships, and flown in by USMC helicopters to land just north of the town of Al Faw, destroying Iraqi artillery.

The insertion began badly with appalling visibility, worsened by fires and sand. The Headquarters of the Brigade Reconnaissance Force crashed in a US CH-46 Sea Knight as the assault formation turned over the Brigade assembly area, killing the seven Royal Marines, one Royal Navy operator and four US marine Corps aviators aboard. The cloud base dropped even further and the commander of the US Marine Air Wing decided to call off any further landings. A new insertion was planned, using RAF Chinook and Puma helicopters, for dawn. The landings finally took place, six hours late and onto insecure landing zones, all the objectives were taken and secured. 42 Commando became the most forward unit in the al-Faw peninsula. They came under friendly fire from a USMC Cobra but no casualties occurred.

=== 21 March ===
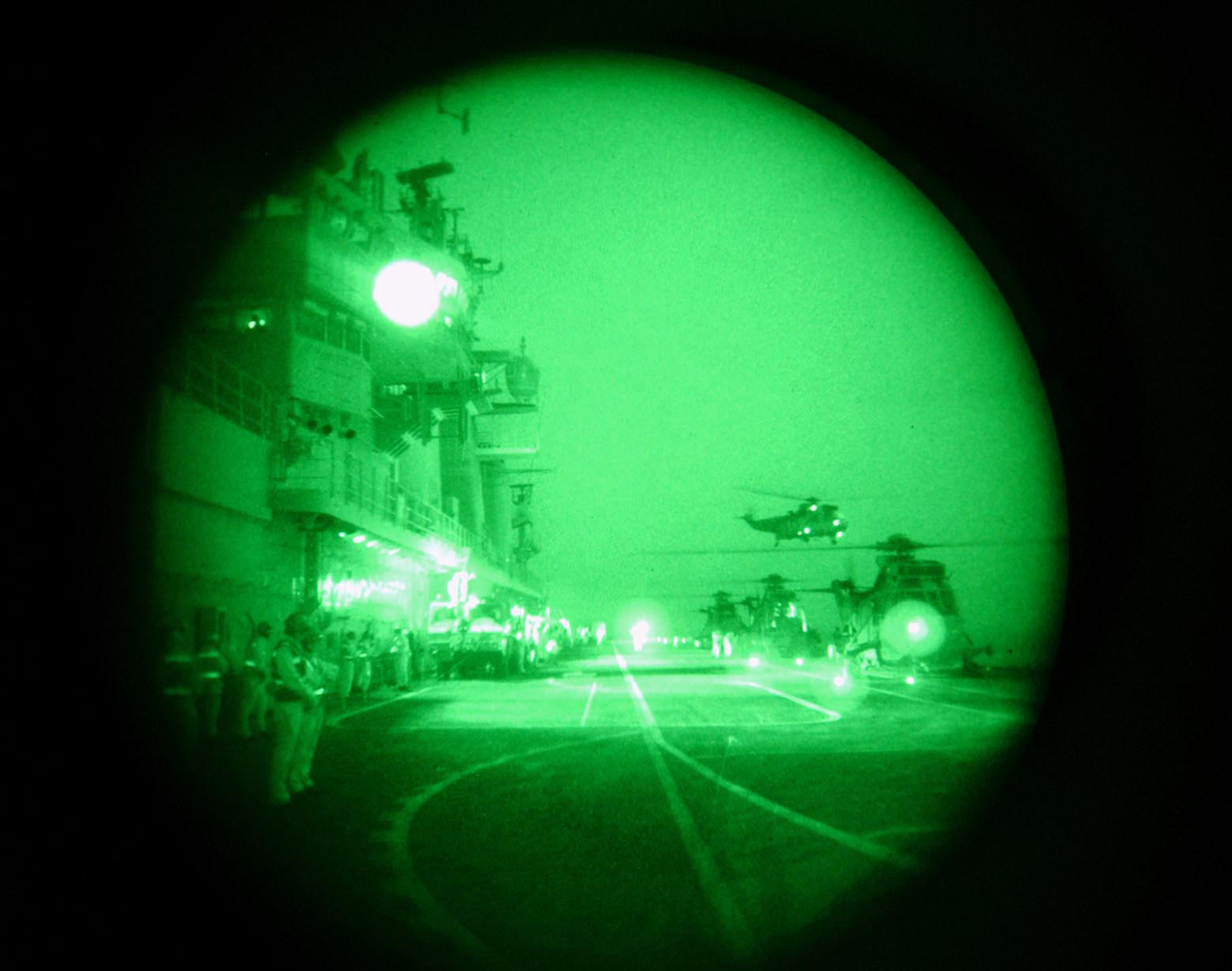
View of Royal Marines disembarking on HMS Ark Royal for operations on the Al-Faw Peninsula, 21 March 2003.

A few hours after the Commandos landed, a group of Iraqi soldiers approached the commandos position, the commandos' machineguns and an AC-130 fired on them killing all but one, who was captured. A company moved out to the town of al-Faw and set up blocking positions to the south east, whilst D company cleared an Iraqi barracks and bunker, following intelligence received from Iraqi locals, the 105 members of A company moved into the town. Whilst in the waste ground in the eastern part of the town the commandos were ambushed, they returned fire killing 7 Iraqis, as they withdrew the commandos came under fire from Iranian border guards. A company halted in the centre of town and prepared to continue their attack when it got dark, they attacked a Ba'athist party headquarters killing 7 Fedayeen fighters, 3 commandos became casualties, in the night the rest of the Fedayeen and Iraqi troops surrendered.

42 Commando, engaged and called in artillery on Fedayeen SUV vehicles entering their battle area, destroying 2, as they moved north, J company came under artillery fire they were attacked by a troop of Iraqis and a T-55 tank, Iranian border guards fired on them, the commandos called in British artillery which destroyed the Iraqi tank and troops.

Plans to land British armour by hovercraft were abandoned once Royal Engineers discovered extensive mining of the beaches near Al Faw which posed too great a danger to heavy U.S. Navy hovercraft carrying UK Scimitars. The 12 Scimitars of C Squadron Queen's Dragoon Guards, which had been loaded onto Hovercraft aboard the USS Rushmore for the landing were instead landed back in Kuwait and finally crossed the waterway north of Umm Qasr twenty-four hours late.

=== 22 March ===
Fedayeen Saddam paramilitaries continued scattered fighting around Umm Qasr. Two Royal Navy Sea King helicopters collided, killing 7 people. The U.S. Army's large landing craft Mechanicsville arrived to drop reinforcements. Marines and PSUs assisted in securing and establishing the beachhead for the landing of USAV Mechanicsville. The landing was largely uncontested but periodically was harried by snipers; the majority of coalition forces had already pushed inland.

=== 23 March ===
15th Marine Expeditionary Unit (later relieved by 42 Commando) achieved their main objectives of securing Umm Qasr ahead of schedule, within 48 hours of crossing the Iraqi border. They then pushed north along the west bank of the Khawr Abd Allah waterway, encountering stiff resistance from Fedayeen Saddam.

=== 24 March ===
40 Commando were tasked to move up the al-Faw peninsula towards Basra; the operation was codenamed Operation Leah. The 14 Challenger 2's of C squadron The Royal Scots Dragoon Guards linked up with 40 Commando and the BRF, with the majority of the force moving along Highway 6 whilst others set up observation posts; the highway from Umm Qasr to Basra was guarded by the Iraqi 6th Armoured Division, 18th Infantry Division and the 51st Mechanized Division with 220–250 tanks. The forward observation posts soon detected Iraqi troops and tanks setting up a defensive line north of highway 6. West of the highway, c/s 30 came under fire from an Iraqi T-55; the CR2 destroyed it with its main armament APFSDS round. An Iraqi armoured brigade attempted a counterattack on al Faw, the force was made up of 60 T-55 tanks, a troop of 4 tanks fired on the Cr2 so the crews called in A-10s and they destroyed the 4 Iraqi tanks. Throughout the day repeated troops of Iraqi tanks attacked C Squadron's CR2's who called in F-18 and A-10 air support to destroy them, A company boarded 6 Sea King helicopters and flew to a forward position to protect 8 Battery, 29 Commando, Royal Artillery as it moved its 105 mm guns to within firing range of the Iraqi armoured brigade's attack. 8th Battery artillery guns, the A-10s and the F-18s airstrikes, as well as by 40 Commando had destroyed over 20 T-55s, the rest retreated back to Basra. 42 Commando relieved the 15th MEU in Umm Qasr.

With the route to Umm Qasr declared safe and the Al Faw Peninsula largely in Coalition hands, this allowed the British 7th Armoured Brigade to press on to Basrah and US forces to advance on Baghdad without the threat of Iraqi forces near Basrah flanking through Al Faq and attacking Coalition supply lines.
