= Paul Tesanovich =

American politician (born 1952)

Member of the Baraga County Board of Commissioners
- In office January 1, 2013 – January 13, 2014
- In office September 2007 – December 31, 2010
- In office January 1, 1987 – July 1990

Member of the Michigan House of Representatives from the 110th district
- In office May 3, 1994 – December 31, 2000
- Preceded by: Stephen Shepich
- Succeeded by: Rich Brown

Personal details
- Born: January 29, 1952 (age 74)
- Party: Democratic
- Spouse: Julie
- Education: Michigan Technological University; Gogebic Community College

Paul Tesanovich (born January 29, 1952) was a Democratic member of the Michigan House of Representatives, serving the western end of the Upper Peninsula from 1995 through 2000. He also served three separate times on the Baraga County Board of Commissioners and a period as chairman of the board.

A former U.P. staffer for then-Speaker Curtis Hertel, Tesanovich was elected to the House in a special election on April 6, 1994 (to replace Stephen Shepich who left office following the House Fiscal Agency scandal), defeating former incumbent Republican Stephen Dresch.
