= 32-foot Transportable Port Security Boat =

US Coast Guard boats

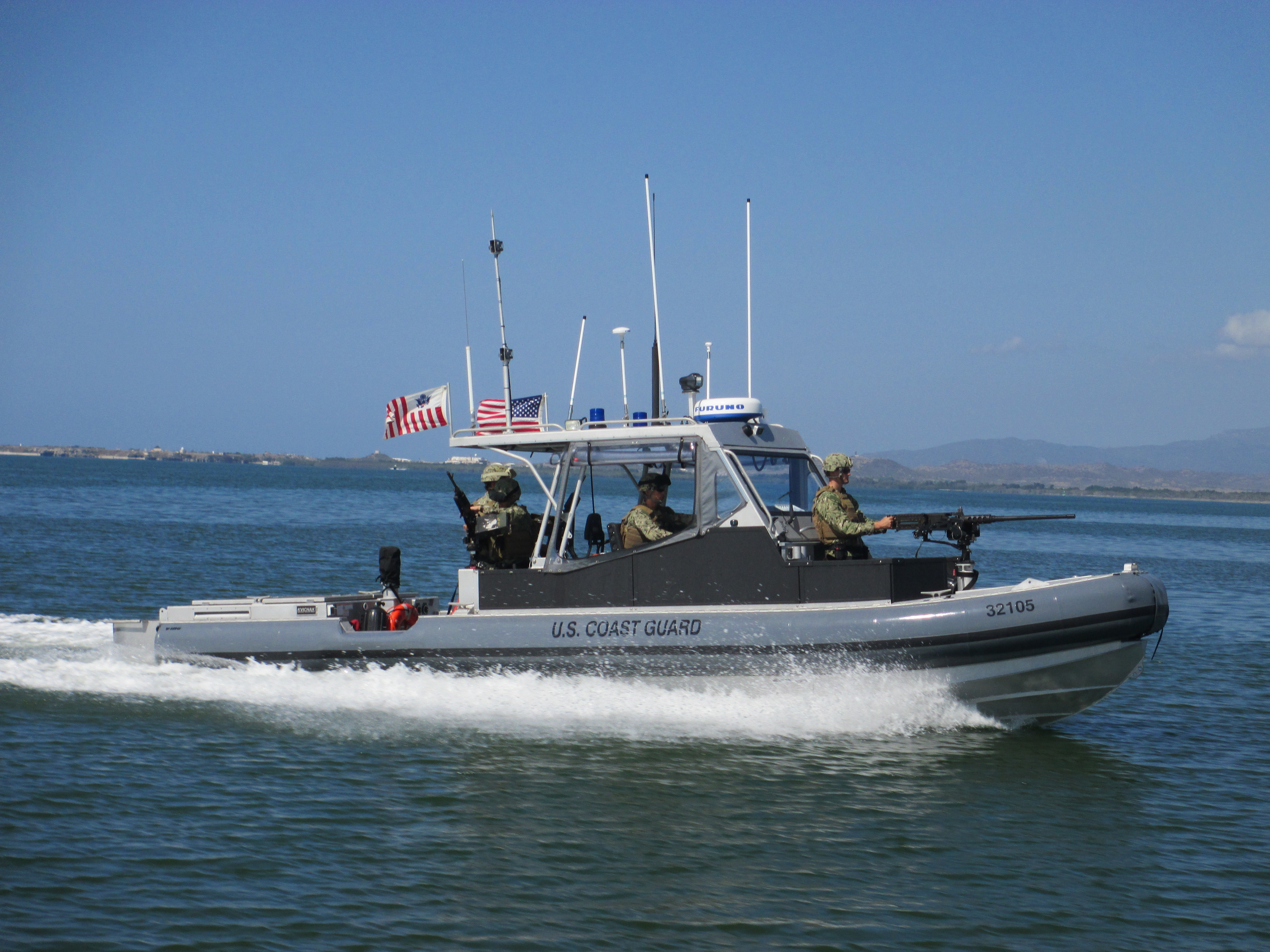
- A TPSB patrolling Guantanamo Bay

Class overview
- Name: 32 ft Transportable Port Security Boat (TPSB)
- Builders: Kvichak Marine Industries
- Operators: United States Coast Guard
- Preceded by: 25 ft Transportable Port Security Boat

General characteristics
- Displacement: 11,306 lbs
- Length: 9.95 metres (32 ft 8 in)
- Beam: 2.59 metres (8 ft 6 in)
- Draft: Min 1 ft 9 in (0.53 m), Max 3 ft (0.91 m)
- Propulsion: Two (2) 315hp Yanmar diesel inboard engines w/ Mercury outdrives
- Speed: 40-45 knots (46-51 mph) (74-83 km/h)
- Endurance: Less than 9 hours
- Sensors & processing systems: Radar and communication systems
- Armament: 2 x M2HB .50-caliber machine guns; 2 x M240B machine guns; Anti-Swimmer grenades; Small arms
- Armour: Ballistic panels
- Aircraft carried: N/A
- Aviation facilities: N/A

The 32-foot Transportable Port Security Boat (TPSB) or (32' TPSB), normally operated by United States Coast Guard Port Security Units (PSUs), provides for defense readiness operations in the United States and when PSUs are deployed overseas. It travels at 43-plus knots, and carries up to two .50 caliber M2 Machine Guns and two 7.62mm M240G Machine Guns. There are 52 in operation.

The TPSBs perform a variety of missions such has Military Readiness, PWCS (Ports, Waterways, and Coastal Security), Maritime Law Enforcement, Defense Operations, and limited Search and Rescue.

== Design ==
The boats are made of aluminum, designed using Solidworks CAD software in 2010 by Brian M. Shumway, and manufactured in Fairhaven, WA by Aluminum Chambered Boats (ACB) under the supervision of engineer and engineering manager Brady O'hare. The design of the fourth-generation TPSB emphasizes crew protection and comfort over previous TPSBs. To achieve improved comfort and survivability, the TPSBs have greater protection due to the use of ballistic panels. Ballistic protection allows the crew to continue to perform their mission even if fired upon. Comforts improvements come in the use of shock mitigating seats, and better stability. The boats can be transported by plane, or by vehicle with a trailer.

== See also ==
- Defender-class boat
- Equipment of the United States Coast Guard
