= Steven E. Day =

U.S. Coast Guard rear admiral

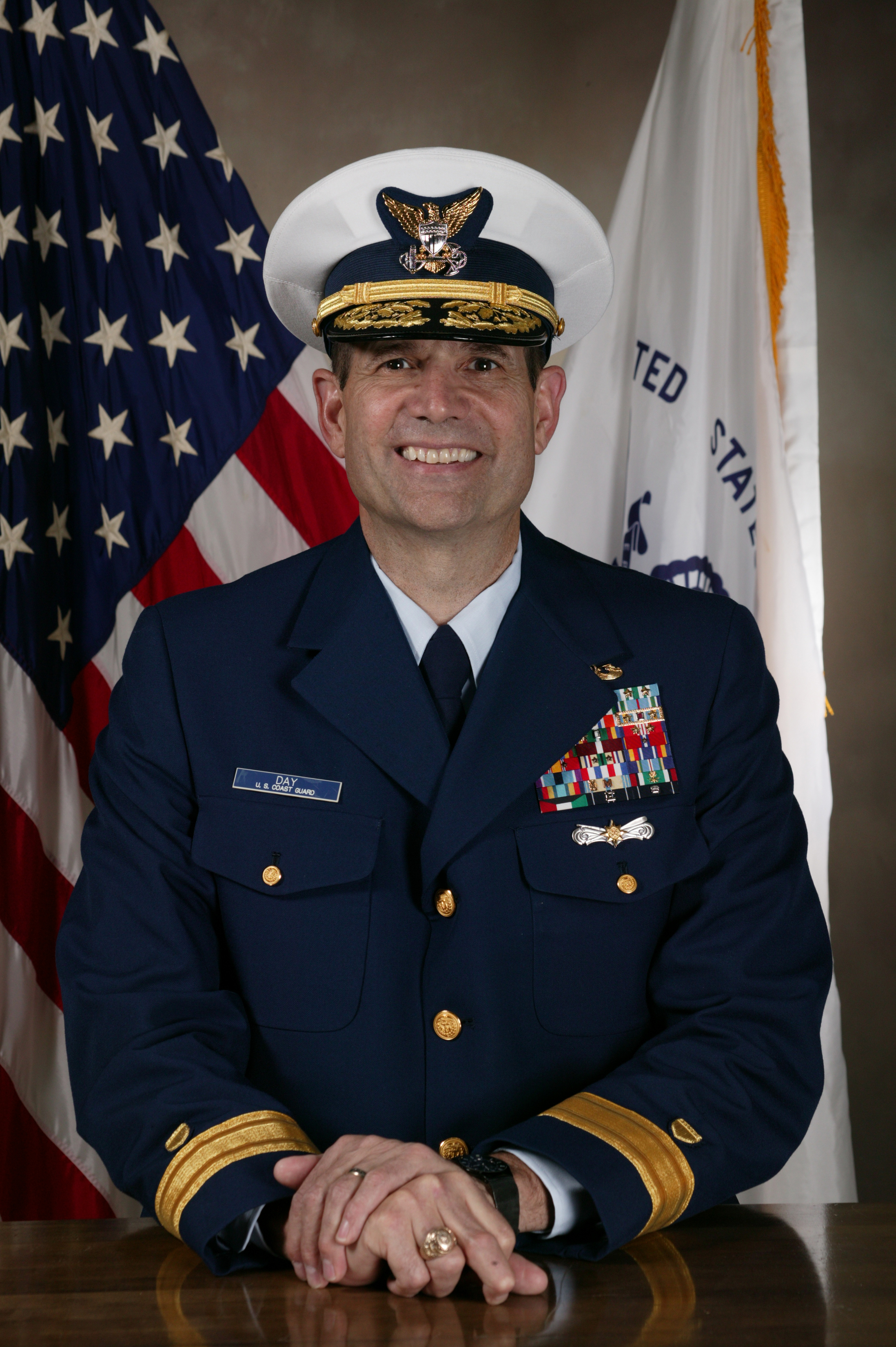
- Rear Admiral Steven E. Day
- Born: Albion, NY
- Military career
- Allegiance: United States of America
- Branch: Coast Guard
- Service years: 46 1/2
- Rank: Rear admiral
- Unit: United States Coast Guard Reserve
- Commands: PSU-303 Milwaukee Wisconsin, Reserve Unit Hancock Michigan, Reserve Unit Green Bay, Wisconsin, PSU-309, Coast Guard Element Joint Forces Command, Joint Reserve Unit Norfolk, United States Coast Guard Reserve
- Awards: Distinguished Service Medal Defense Meritorious Service Medal, Meritorious Service Medal (3), Joint Defense Commendation Medal (3), Coast Guard Commendation Medal, Navy Commendation Medal, Coast Guard Achievement Medal and a Joint Defense Achievement Medal

Steven E. Day is a United States Coast Guard rear admiral whose final duty assignment was Director of Reserve and leadership, (CG-13). In this role he commanded the United States Coast Guard Reserve. He previously served as the US deputy commander for mobilization and reserve affairs, Atlantic Area, US Coast Guard.

== Early life and education ==
Rear Admiral Day was born in Albion, New York, and due to his father's employment with the Veterans Administration lived in Holley, New York, Bath, New York, and graduated from Norway-Vulcan High School, Norway, Michigan, in 1967. Day holds an associate degree from Gogebic Community College, and is also a distinguished alumni of Gogebic Community College. He also holds a bachelor's degree from Northern Michigan University, and a master's degree from the University of Wisconsin–Stevens Point, of which he is also a distinguished alumni.

== Family ==
His father and mother instilled in his five sisters and three brothers that we owe our country at least two years of service. Evidence of this is Day's father retired as a colonel, U.S. Army Reserve MP, his sister Suzanne completed four years active duty U.S. Air Force, his brother Chuck retired as a chief yeoman, U. S. Coast Guard after 22 years, and his brother Mike who entered the Coast Guard in 1966, retired as a CWO4 F&S, after 42 years of service.

== Career history ==
Day enlisted in the U.S. Coast Guard in 1967. After recruit training, he attended Damage Controlman School at Governors Island, New York. As a damage controlman, Day held assignments at TRASUPCEN Alameda, USCGC Tanager, Reserve Unit Duluth, and Reserve Unit Green Bay, where he was promoted to damage controlman first class in 1977.

Day received his commission in 1979 at the rank of ensign. Assignments as an officer have included; Reserve Green Bay, commanding officer of Reserve Unit Hancock, and the operations officer of Port Security Unit 303 Milwaukee, when he was deployed to the Port of Damman, Saudi Arabia, in support of Operations Desert Shield/Desert Storm from September 1990 to April 1991.

Upon release from active duty in 1991, Day's assignments included; commanding officer Reserve Unit Green Bay, FEMA liaison officer Milwaukee, commanding officer PSU 303 Milwaukee, USTRANSCOM, and commanding officer Port Security Unit 309, where his unit conducted deployments to Pohang, Korea, Dukaylah, Egypt, OPSAIL 2000, New York City and Manama, Bahrain. Beginning in 2001, Day was again assigned to USTRANSCOM, followed by the commanding officer, Coast Guard Element, Joint Forces Command Norfolk and commanding officer, Joint Reserve Unit, Norfolk, Virginia.

In March 2003, Day was again recalled to active duty in support of Operation Iraqi Freedom, assigned to the Pentagon, National Military Command Center and Coast Guard Headquarters, Defense Operations. Upon release from active duty, he was assigned as the senior reserve officer, deputy chief of staff D5 and then to PACAREA as the reserve chief of staff/senior reserve officer. On June 9, 2008, Day began an assignment at LANTAREA, and ended the assignment in April 2012. From 2012 to retirement in 2014 he was the Director of Reserve and Leadership.

== Awards, decorations, and recognition ==
=== Awards and recognitions ===
Defense Meritorious Service Medal

Meritorious Service Medal with three gold award stars

Joint Service Commendation Medal (with three bronze oak leaf clusters)

Navy Commendation Medal

Coast Guard Commendation Medal

Coast Guard Achievement Medal

Joint Service Achievement Medal

Kuwait Liberation Medal (Kuwait)

Coast Guard Distinguished Service ribbon.svg Coast Guard Distinguished Service Meda
