= Gregory Markkanen =

American politician

Greg Markkanen

Member of the Michigan House of Representatives from the 110th district
- Incumbent
- Assumed office January 9, 2019
- Preceded by: Scott Dianda

Personal details
- Born: March 7, 1958 (age 68) Cloquet, Minnesota
- Party: Republican
- Spouse: Jane
- Children: 2
- Education: Northern Michigan University; Michigan Technological University

Gregory John Markkanen (born March 7, 1958) is a Republican politician. He has been serving as a member of the Michigan House of Representatives since 2019, representing the 110th district.

== Political career ==
Markkanen first ran for state representative in 2016 for the 110th district, but was defeated by the Democratic incumbent Scott Dianda. Following Dianda's retirement, he ran for the seat in 2018, narrowly defeating Democratic candidate Ken Summers. He was reelected in 2020, in 2022, and in 2024.

Markkanen has been critical of president Joe Biden and the Biden administration, and has endorsed former president Donald Trump in the 2024 presidential election, saying "The policies of the last 3 years cannot continue. We have seen lawlessness and previously unimaginable horrors at our southern border long-enough. A country without a border cannot survive forever, and the person who is best able to put an end to it is Donald Trump."

Markkanen is pro-life and has repeatedly voted against protecting and furthering abortion rights in Michigan.

== Personal life ==
Markkanen holds a professional teaching certificate from the state of Michigan, and taught high school civics, history and geography for Baraga Area Schools. Markkanen is an Endowed Life Member of the National Rifle Association of America.

== Electoral history ==
2016 Michigan's 110th House of Representatives district election
Party	Candidate	Votes	%
Democratic	Scott Dianda (incumbent)	23,532	61.05
Republican	Gregory Markkanen	15,016	38.95
Total votes		38,548	100.0
Democratic hold			

2018 Michigan's 110th House of Representatives district election
Party	Candidate	Votes	%
Republican	Gregory Markkanen	17,980	50.82
Democratic	Ken Summers	17,401	49.18
Total votes		35,381	100.0
Republican gain from Democratic			

2020 Michigan's 110th House of Representatives district election
Party	Candidate	Votes	%
Republican	Gregory Markkanen (incumbent)	25,802	57.59
Democratic	Janet Metsa	18,457	41.20
Green	Rick Sauermilch	543	1.21
Total votes		44,802	100.0
Republican hold			

2022 Michigan's 110th House of Representatives district election
Party	Candidate	Votes	%
Republican	Gregory Markkanen (incumbent)	25,462	63.35
Democratic	Casey VerBerkmoes	14,732	36.65
Total votes		40,194	100.0
Republican hold			

2024 Michigan's 110th House of Representatives district election
Party	Candidate	Votes	%
Republican	Gregory Markkanen (incumbent)	31,583	63.07
Democratic	Kim S. Corcoran	18,493	36.93
Total votes		50,076	100.0
Republican hold			

Political offices
Preceded by Scott Dianda	Michigan Representatives; 110th District; 2019–present	Succeeded by Incumbent
