= Scott Dianda =

American politician

Member of the Michigan House of Representatives from the 110th district
- In office January 1, 2013 – January 1, 2019
- Preceded by: Matt Huuki
- Succeeded by: Gregory Markkanen

Personal details
- Born: April 11, 1971 (age 55)
- Party: Democratic
- Spouse: Debbie
- Website: Rep. Scott Dianda

Scott Dianda (born April 11, 1971) is a former Democratic politician from Michigan, who represented the 110th District of the Michigan House of Representatives from 2013 to 2019. The district consisted of Baraga, Gogebic, Houghton, Iron, Keweenaw, and Ontonagon counties, as well as Powell and Ishpeming Townships in Marquette County. Prior to his election, Dianda was president of the Village of Calumet.

Dianda announced on April 3, 2017 that he would run for the 38th district of the Michigan Senate. Dianda lost the general election on November 6, 2018, after advancing from the primary on August 7, 2018.
