= Michael Lahti =

American politician (1945–2025)

Mike Lahti

Member of the Michigan House of Representatives from the 110th district
- In office 2007–2011
- Preceded by: Rich Brown
- Succeeded by: Matt Huuki

Personal details
- Born: October 10, 1945 Hancock, Michigan, U.S.
- Died: December 29, 2025 (aged 80) Hancock, Michigan, U.S.
- Party: Democratic
- Spouse: Sharon Lahti
- Profession: Realtor, Small Business Owner

Michael A. Lahti (October 10, 1945 – December 29, 2025) was an American politician from the state of Michigan. A Democrat, Lahti served in the Michigan House of Representatives representing the 110th District, which is located in the Upper Peninsula and includes all of Iron County, Gogebic County, Ontonagon County, Baraga County, Houghton County, Keweenaw County and Powell Township in Marquette County.

== Background ==
Lahti was born in Hancock, Michigan, on October 10, 1945, and graduated from Hancock High School. He graduated from Northern Michigan University in 1967. A year after he graduated, Lahti opened a State Farm Insurance agency in Hancock. Lahti was a small business owner and real-estate developer, owning private and commercial lands all across the Keweenaw Peninsula.

Lahti lived in Hancock with his wife, Sharon Lahti. He had six children, 15 grandchildren and one great-grandson. Lahti died from a heart attack in Hancock on December 29, 2025, at the age of 80.

== Political career ==
Lahti was elected to the Hancock area School Board in 1994, where he served for seven years. Also in 1994, he was appointed to the Finlandia University board of trustees, where he served for 13 years. In 2000, Lahti was elected to the Houghton County Commission as a Democrat. He served as chairman of the commission for 6 years. In 2006 he announced his intention to run for the State House seat District 110, being vacated by Democrat Rich Brown. The 110th District is located in the western portion of the Upper Peninsula and is one of the largest in the state. Lahti easily won the Democratic Primary, and went on to face Republican Dave Schmidt in the general election. He won 64% to 34%. He was easily re-elected in 2008 with 70% of the vote.

In 2010 Lahti ran for the Michigan Senate in the 38th district, which includes the western Upper Peninsula. Lahti lost to former state representative Tom Casperson.

== Later career ==
After leaving the House in 2011, Lahti returned to the real estate profession. He was also re-appointed to the Board of Trustees of Finlandia University.

== Electoral history ==
- 2010 election for State Senate
  - Tom Casperson (R), 56%
  - Mike Lahti (D), 44%
- 2008 election for State House
  - Mike Lahti (D), 70%
  - John Larson (R), 30%
- 2006 election for State House
  - Mike Lahti (D), 64%
  - Dave Schmidt (R), 34%
