= Richard A. Sofio =

American politician (1946–2009)

Member of the Michigan House of Representatives from the 110th district
- In office January 1, 1987 – December 31, 1990
- Preceded by: Don Koivisto
- Succeeded by: Stephen Dresch

Personal details
- Born: March 5, 1946 Bessemer Township, Michigan
- Died: February 28, 2009 (aged 62) Lansing, Michigan
- Party: Democratic

Richard Anthony "Rick" Sofio (March 5, 1946 – February 28, 2009) was an American politician and teacher.

Born in Bessemer, Michigan, Sofio graduated from A. D. Johnston High School in Bessemer. He went to Gogebic Community College. He received his bachelor's and master's degrees from Northern Michigan University. He also took graduated courses at Michigan State University. He taught political science and was a football coach at A. D. Johnston High School. Sofio served on the Gogebic County Board of Commissioners and on the school board. Sofio served in the Michigan House of Representatives for two terms from 1987 to 1991. He was a Democrat. Sofio died in Lansing, Michigan.
