= Rich Brown (Michigan politician) =

American politician

31st Clerk of the Michigan House of Representatives
- In office January 11, 2023 – January 8, 2025
- Preceded by: Gary L. Randall
- Succeeded by: Scott Starr
- In office January 10, 2007 – December 29, 2010
- Preceded by: Gary L. Randall
- Succeeded by: Gary L. Randall

Assistant Clerk of the Michigan House of Representatives
- In office January 12, 2011 – January 11, 2023
- Preceded by: Gary L. Randall
- Succeeded by: Scott Starr

Member of the Michigan House of Representatives from the 110th district
- In office January 1, 2001 – December 31, 2006
- Preceded by: Paul Tesanovich
- Succeeded by: Michael Lahti

Gogebic County Clerk and Register of Deeds
- In office January 1, 1985 – December 31, 2000

Personal details
- Born: Richard J. Brown; April 9, 1956 (age 70)
- Party: Democratic
- Spouse: Ann Marie

Rich Brown (Richard J. Brown, born April 9, 1956) is the former clerk, former assistant clerk, and former Democratic member of the Michigan House of Representatives.

Brown had a career in radio, for WUUN (now WFXD) in Marquette and as news director at WUPM in Ironwood, before working as a reporter for the Ironwood Daily Globe. He was also the director of the Marty's Goldenaires Senior Drum and Bugle Corps in Bessemer.

Immediately prior to his election to the House, Brown served 16 years as Gogebic County Clerk and Register of Deeds, and was named Michigan County Clerk of the Year in 1992.
