= Matt Huuki =

American politician

Member of the Michigan House of Representatives from the 110th district
- In office January 1, 2011 – December 31, 2012
- Preceded by: Michael Lahti
- Succeeded by: Scott Dianda

Personal details
- Born: April 23, 1977 (age 49) Hancock, Michigan
- Party: Republican
- Spouse: Janell

Matt Huuki (born April 23, 1977) was a Republican member of the Michigan House of Representatives who served one term representing the western end of the Upper Peninsula.
