= Stephen Dresch =

American politician

The Honorable Stephen P. Dresch

Member of the Michigan House of Representatives from the 110th district
- In office January 1, 1991 – December 31, 1992
- Preceded by: Richard A. Sofio
- Succeeded by: Stephen Shepich

Personal details
- Born: December 12, 1943 East St. Louis, Illinois
- Died: August 6, 2006 (aged 62) Hancock, Michigan
- Party: Republican
- Spouse: Linda
- Education: Yale University (Ph.D.); Miami University

Stephen Paul Dresch was a scholar and professor and a one-term Republican member of the Michigan House of Representatives, serving the western end of the Upper Peninsula in the early 1990s.

== Background ==
Dresch was born in East St. Louis, Illinois in 1943, the first son of Rev. Lester and Lenore Dresch. He graduated from high school at the age of 16. At 19, he married Linda Ness and graduated from Miami University in Ohio. He later earned a Ph.D. in economics at Yale University.

He was a research associate at the National Bureau of Economic Research from 1969 through 1977, and the director of research in economics of higher education at Yale University from 1972 through 1975. Dresch founded the Institute for Demographic and Economic Studies in New Haven, Connecticut, in 1975, and joined the International Institute for Applied Systems Analysis in Vienna, Austria, which advocated the adoption of free market economics in Eastern Europe, in 1983. Dresch became the dean of business and engineering administration at Michigan Tech from 1985 until his election in 1990, also serving as a visiting scholar at the institute of Economics and Forecasting of Scientific and Technological Progress of the USSR Academy of Sciences in 1988.

== In the legislature ==
Following Dresch' role in exposing internal corruption at Michigan Tech, he chose to run in 1990 for the 110th District of the Michigan House of Representatives (Keweenaw, Houghton, Ontonagon, Gogebic and Iron counties). He was not supported by legislative leadership, who allegedly vowed, "No Dresch bill will leave this House." He was nonetheless elected Assistant Minority Whip by his fellow Republicans. He served on the standing committees on civil rights, constitution and women's issues, marine affairs and port development, social services and youth, and transportation. The 110th District was slightly modified in 1992 by the addition of Baraga County. Dresch was not re-elected (he ran instead for the Republican nomination for Congress from his district, losing to Philip Ruppe in the primary), and was succeeded by Democrat Stephen Shepich. When Shepich resigned in January 1994 (as part of a plea bargain following the House Fiscal Agency scandal), Dresch ran for his old seat in a special election on April 6, 1994, but lost to Democrat Paul Tesanovich. (He lost by 39 votes, and some of his supporters claimed fraud in Gogebic County; but no recount was requested.)

== After legislative service ==
In 2005, Dresch was running a company called Forensic Intelligence International. While working with mobster Gregory Scarpa Jr., who was being held in the same prison as Terry Nichols (convicted accomplice of Timothy McVeigh in the 1995 Oklahoma City bombing), Dresch found out about explosives concealed in Nicholls' former home, and tipped off the FBI and members of Congress.

Dresch died August 6, 2006, at his home in Hancock, Michigan. He and Linda had two sons and two daughters.

In August 2021, Dresch' son Karl pleaded guilty to a misdemeanor for his participation in the 2021 storming of the United States Capitol. In exchange for his plea, prosecutors dismissed four other counts. He was sentenced to time served after spending six months in prison awaiting trial.
