= Port Security Unit =

U.S. Coast Guard specialized units

The United States Coast Guard's Port Security Units (PSUs) are Deployable Specialized Forces organized for sustained expeditionary security and anti-terrorism. They conduct anti-terrorism force protection missions, which include harbor and port security, protection of high value assets (HVAs), defense of Sea Lines of Communication (SLOCs), coastal surveillance, and other expeditionary missions in support of regional combatant commanders.

Since their first major combat deployments during the Gulf War (Operation Desert Shield/Operation Desert Storm, 1990–1991), PSUs have maintained a strong history of overseas operations. They deployed again in force during Operation Iraqi Freedom, where PSUs 311 and 313 deployed during the Battle of Al Faw—securing captured Iraqi oil terminals immediately after the assault and providing critical port security at Battle of Umm Qasr. Throughout the Global War on Terrorism, including support for operations in Afghanistan, PSUs have conducted extended rotations in the Middle East, notably through Patrol Forces Southwest Asia (PATFORSWA), performing maritime escorts, high-value asset protection, and force protection in high-threat environments.

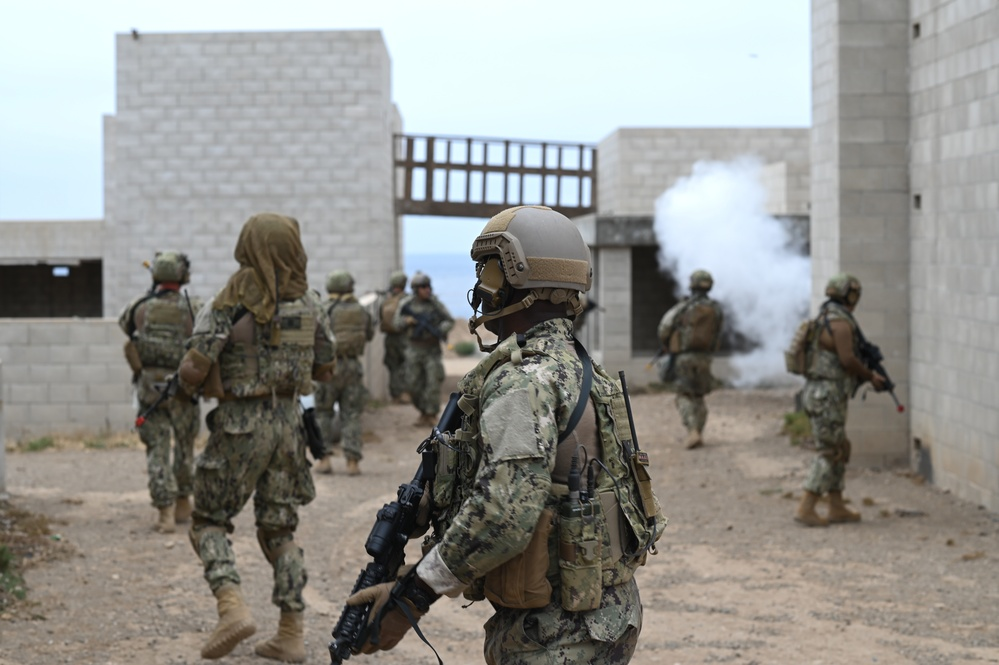
Port Security Unit (PSU) 311 of the Deployable Specialized Forces

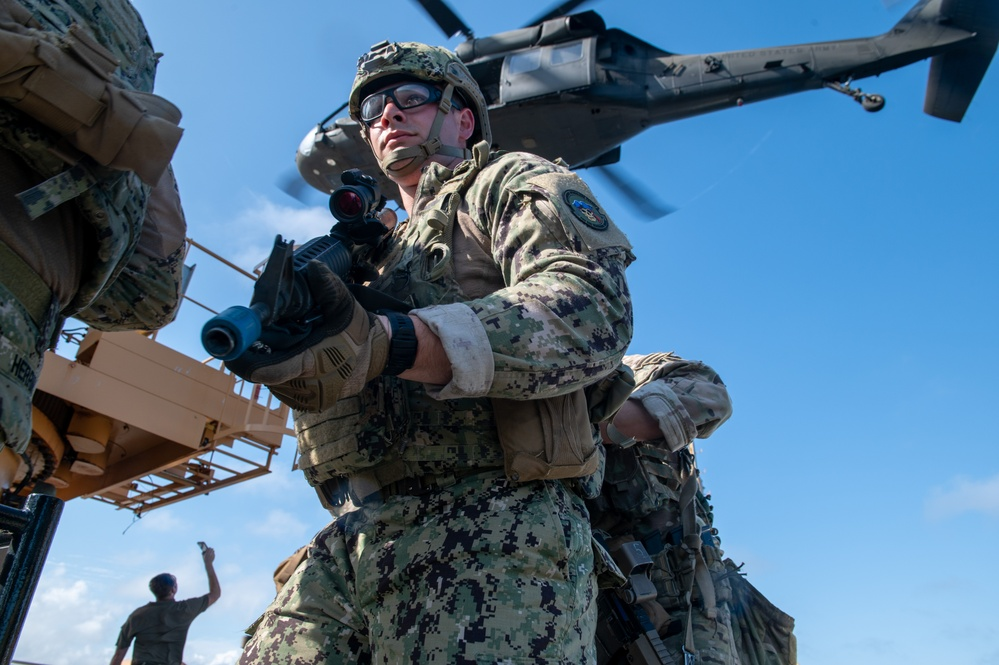
PSU 308 members train with U.S. Army Special Forces assigned to the 3rd Special Forces Group (Airborne) to retake a ship overrun by opposing forces after fast-roping insertion

PSUs are unique among Coast Guard units in that they can be rapidly requested and tasked by the Department of Defense. They are capable of deploying worldwide within 96 hours. PSUs often operate and integrate with the Marines and Navy Expeditionary Combat Command elements. PSUs are also the only Coast Guard element that provides land warfare security capabilities.

PSUs were originally part of the Coast Guard's Deployable Operations Group until it was reorganized; PSUs are now part of the Special Missions Command, which includes Maritime Security Response Team, Maritime Safety and Security Teams, and Tactical Law Enforcement Teams.

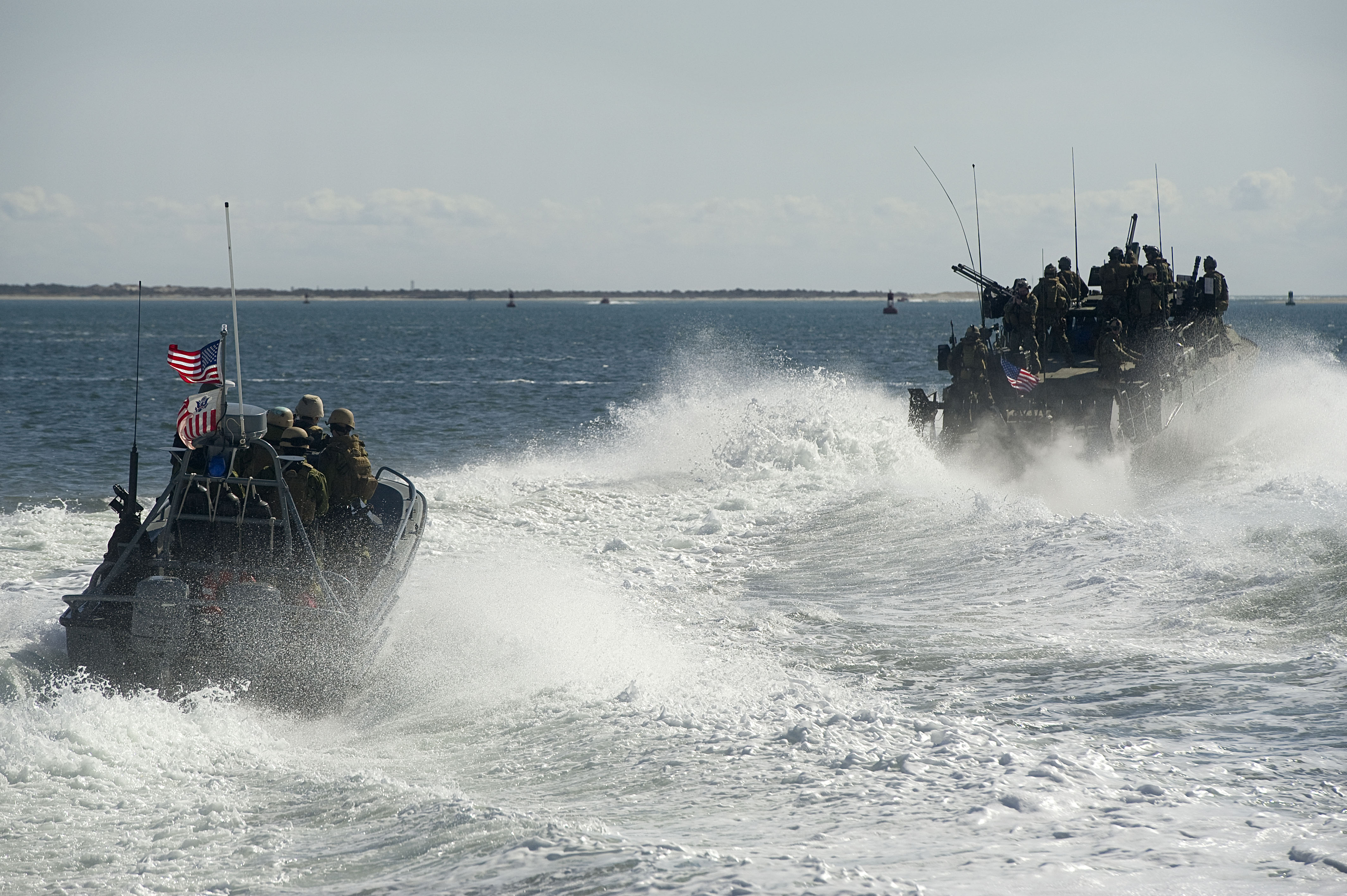
Transportable Port Security Boats attached to Port Security Unit 308, at Camp Lejeune in 2012

== History ==
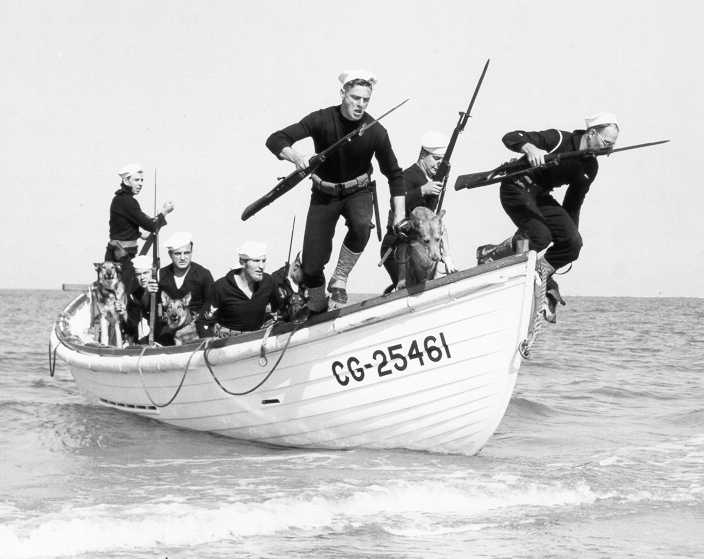
United States Coast Guard Beach Patrol in South Carolina training with military working dogs in 1943

=== Origins ===
The Port Security program of the U.S. Coast Guard began as a result of the Black Tom explosion and the passage of the Espionage Act of 1917. By this act, the Coast Guard's Captains of the Port were given responsibility for the security of port areas. During World War I, port security operations were conducted by active-duty personnel.

After World War I, interest in port security decreased until images of burning ships visible from US coastlines, as the country entered World War II, rekindled media and public concern. In World War II, the Coast Guard increased its involvement in port security by conducting more coastal patrols, defending waterfront structures, and assuring the safe movement of ships. This entailed searching merchant vessels, supervising combat loading, and maintaining seacoast defenses, such as machine gun nests. The Temporary Reserve was created and made up of armed volunteers under the command of the captain of the port. Over 125,000 citizens would eventually serve as Temporary Reserves.

=== Birth of PSUs and national response ===
During the early 1980s, Department of Defense planners formally identified the need for port security forces in OCONUS seaports. Dialogue began between the Army, Navy, and Coast Guard; and the concept of the deployable Port Security Unit (PSU) was born. In January 1985, the commandant of the Coast Guard approved three national PSUs to respond to the requirements of Department of Defense operations plans. The three units were located in the U.S. Coast Guard Great Lakes District, then known as District 9, at Buffalo, New York; Cleveland, Ohio; and Milwaukee, Wisconsin.

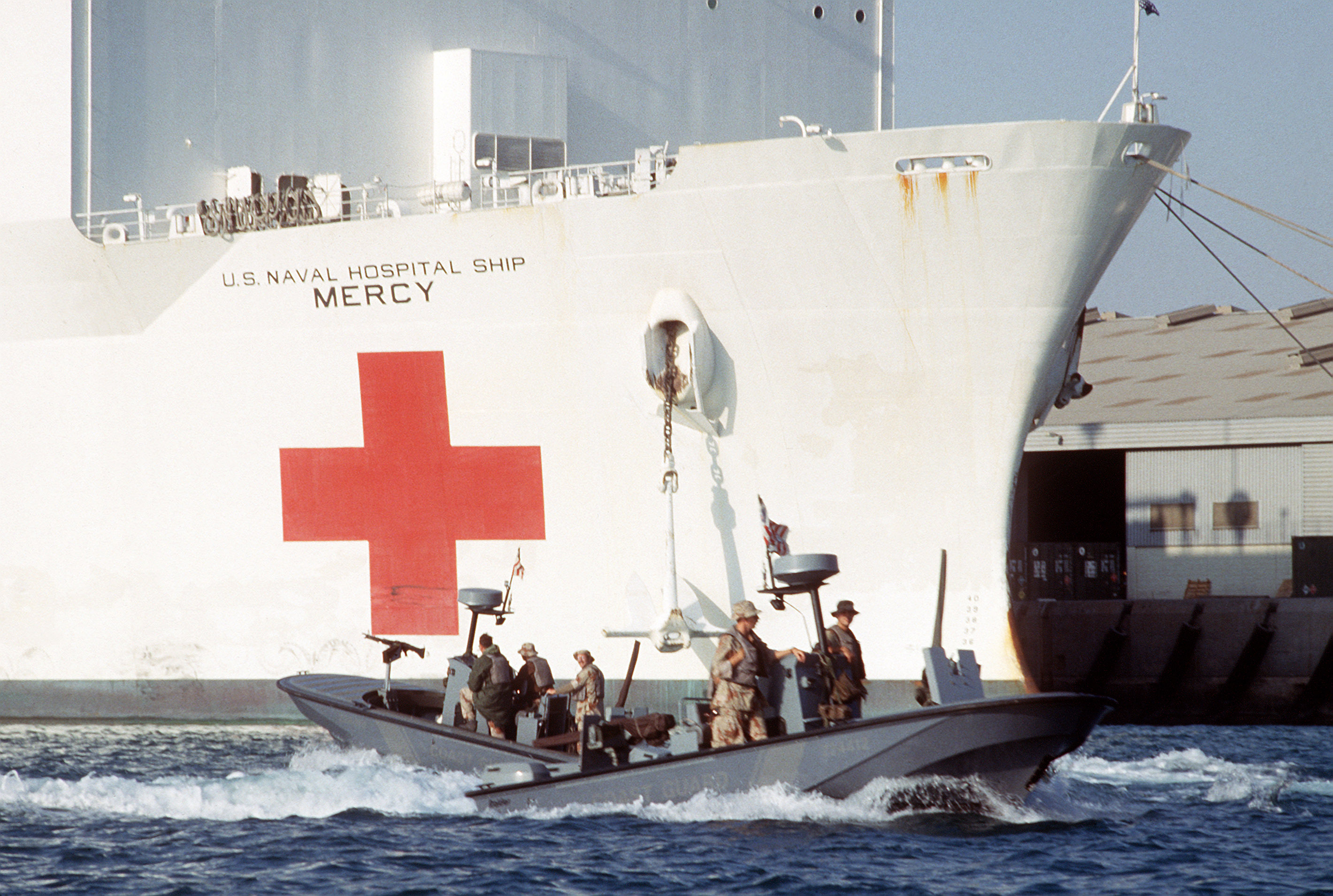
Operation Desert Storm - Port Security Unit 302

In addition to operations around the world, PSUs were first deployed, in 1990, to the Persian Gulf during the Gulf War. They operated in Haiti during Operation Uphold Democracy in 1994, deployed to Port-au-Prince immediately after the devastating 2010 earthquake, and responded to various natural disasters in the United States, such as Hurricane Maria and Hurricane Ida.

=== War on Terror ===
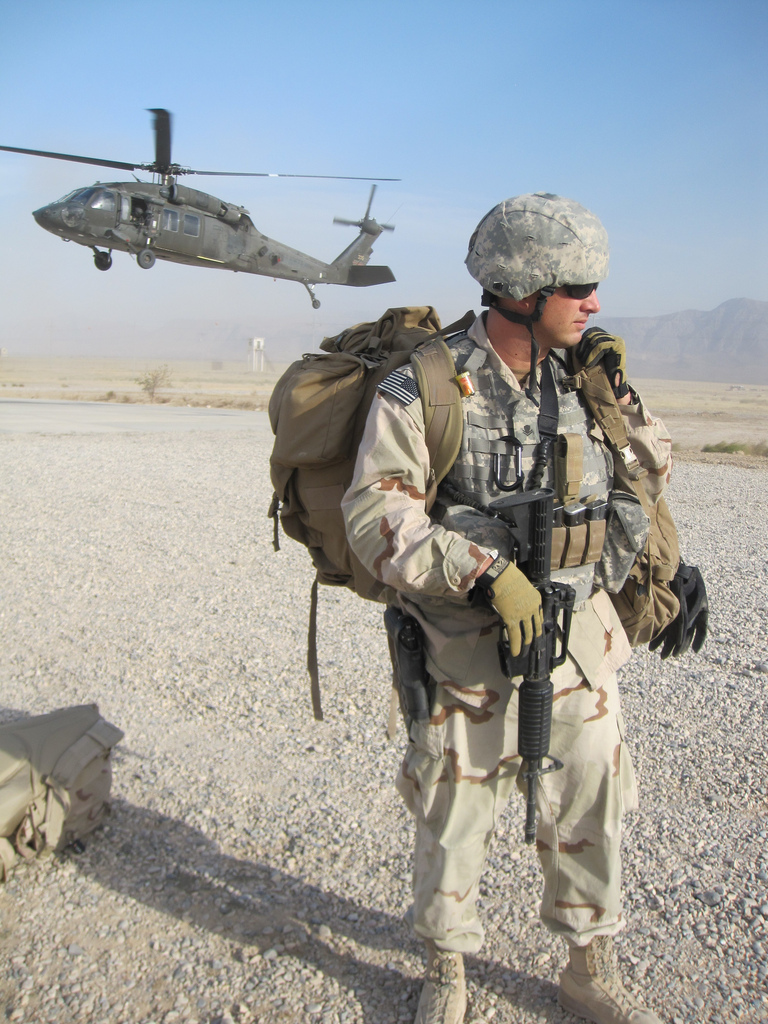
Coast Guard PSU reservist RAID in Afghanistan

PSUs have played an active role during the war on terror and have been deployed on numerous operations such as Operation Noble Eagle, Operation Enduring Freedom, and Operation Iraqi Freedom.

In December 2000, PSU 309 from Port Clinton, Ohio, was deployed to the Middle East to provide vital force protection for U.S. Navy assets following the attack on the USS Cole.

PSUs 309, 311, and 313 served in support of Operation Iraqi Freedom and operated under Naval Coastal Warfare Group One (NCWG 1). In March 2003, an amphibious force, composed largely of British Royal Marines, initiated an amphibious assault against Iraqi defenses on the Al Faw Peninsula, the location of many Iraqi oil facilities. In the Battle of Al Faw, shortly after the oil terminals had been cleared of Iraqi troops, explosives, and weapons by Navy SEAL and Marine assault teams, PSUs 311 and 313 arrived to take control of the facilities. PSU boats met the U.S. Army's large landing craft USAV Mechanicsville and formed up in close formation near it to complete their transit to the oil facilities. PSUs also helped secure and establish the beachhead for the USAV Mechanicsville's beach landing. At the same time, a shoreside element of the PSU units reached the boat landing by convoy to help secure the port. They helped unload army vehicles and prepared for operations. While most of the coalition forces had secured the port earlier, snipers occasionally harassed the landing element and PSUs.

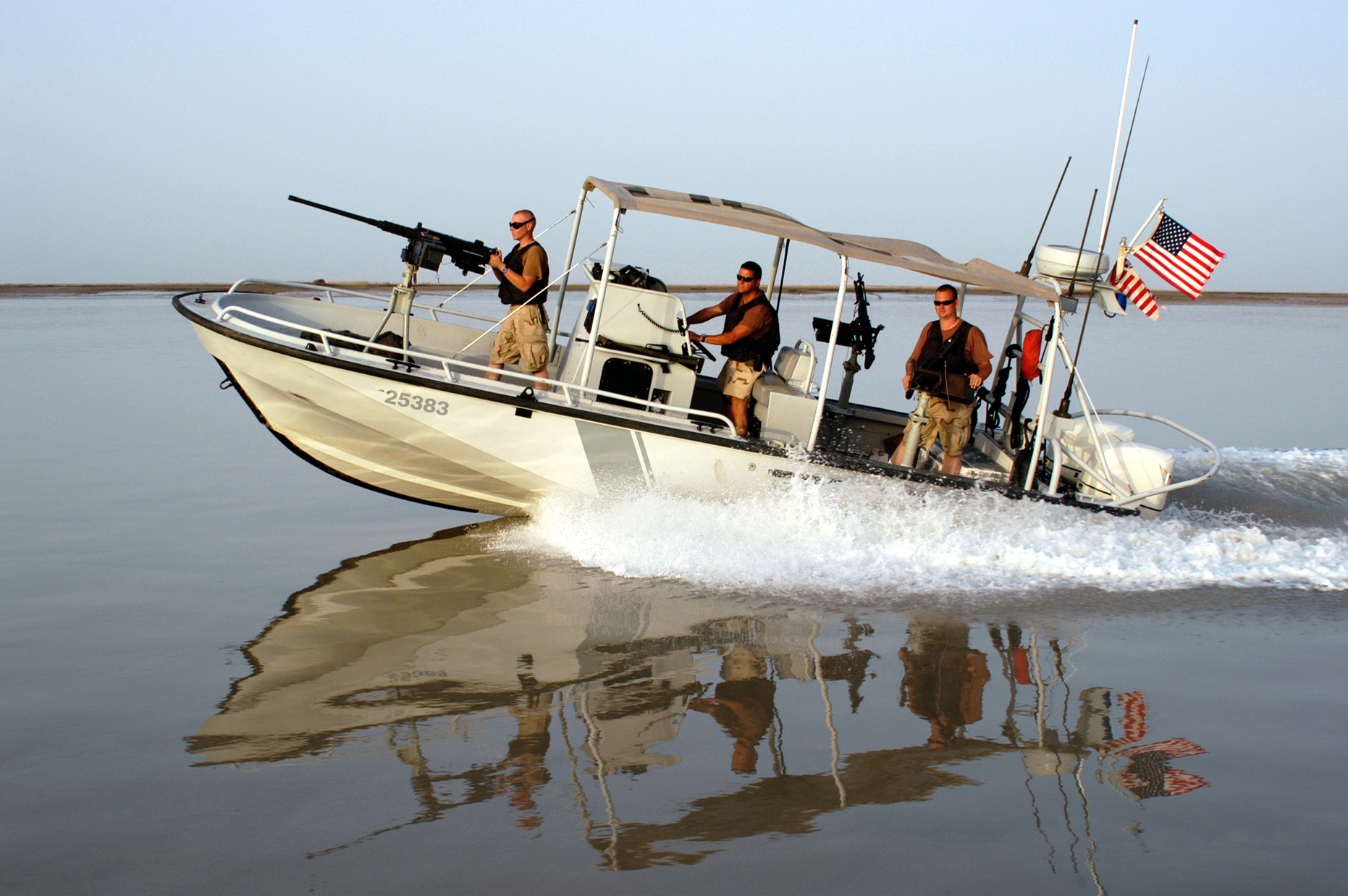
Port Security Unit 311 in Iraq (2003)

Days later, an element of PSUs moved into Umm Qasr with coalition forces. NCWG 1 reassigned PSU 311 from its original mission and tasked it with providing port and perimeter security at Umm Qasr on the Khor Abd Allah Waterway during the Battle of Umm Qasr. Meanwhile, remaining members of PSUs 309, 311, and 313 supported port security needs at the back at the port of Ash Shuaybah.

=== National Special Security Events ===
Port Security Units (PSUs) have supported numerous high-profile National Special Security Events (NSSEs), including presidential protection details. In 2009, PSUs provided waterside security for the inauguration of President Barack Obama in Washington, D.C., and the G-20 Summit in Pittsburgh, Pennsylvania. This has included waterside and force protection support during visits by President Donald Trump to locations such as Mar-a-Lago in Palm Beach, Florida.

== Training ==
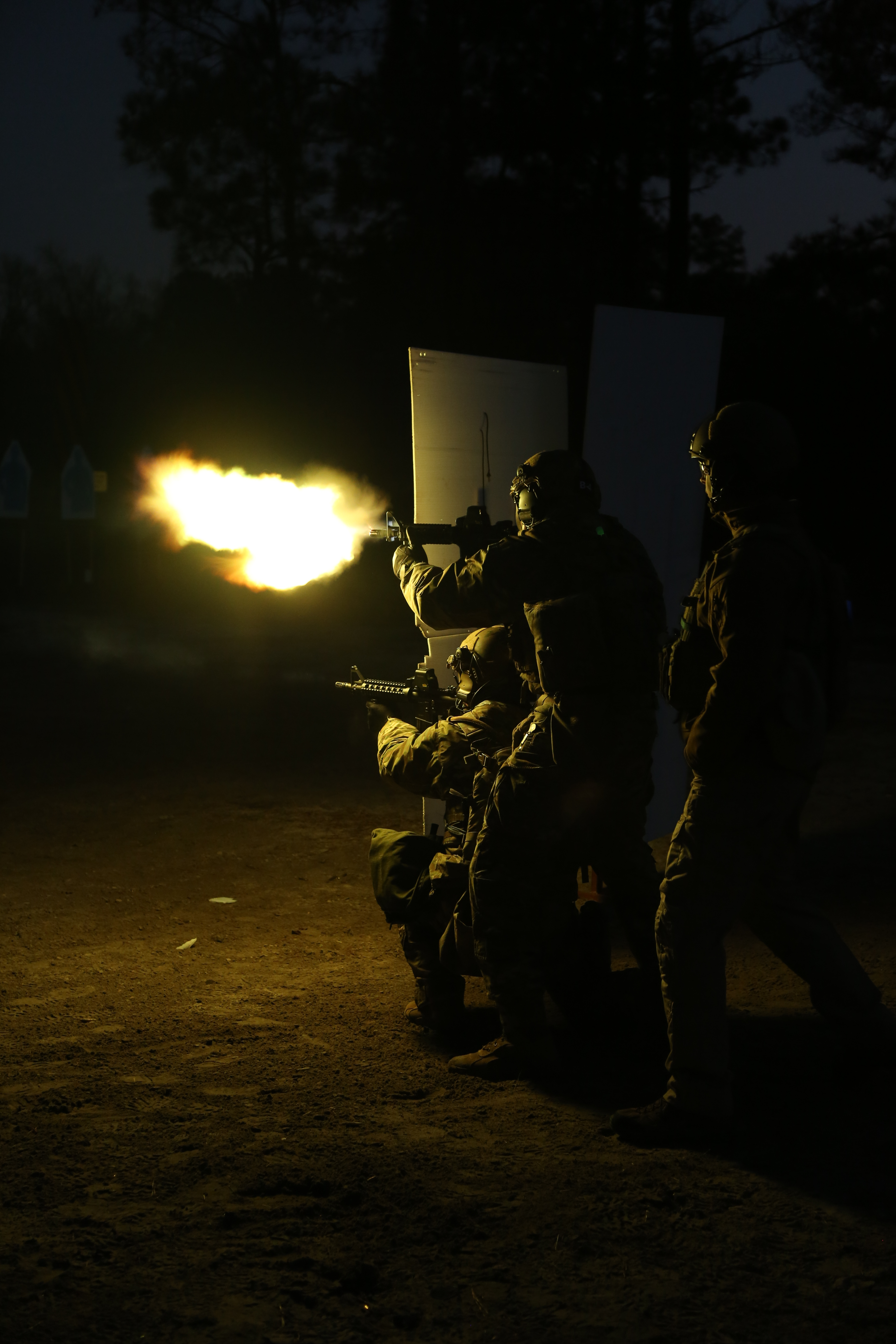
Coast Guard sharpens shooting skills at Camp Lejeune

In addition to completing A-school training for their respective billets, members of Port Security Units receive training at the Marine Corps Base Camp Lejeune's Special Missions Training Center (SMTC). Training at SMTC includes close-quarters combat, military operations in urban terrain (MOUT), CBRN defense, tactical combat casualty care (TCCC), tactical coxswain, opposing force (OPFOR) tactical coxswain, tactical bow gunner, land navigation, Entry Control Points (ECP), vehicle searches, rear area security, crew-served weapons, convoy operations, patrolling, individual movements, and squad movements. Practical and live fire training exercises are also conducted.

== Capabilities ==
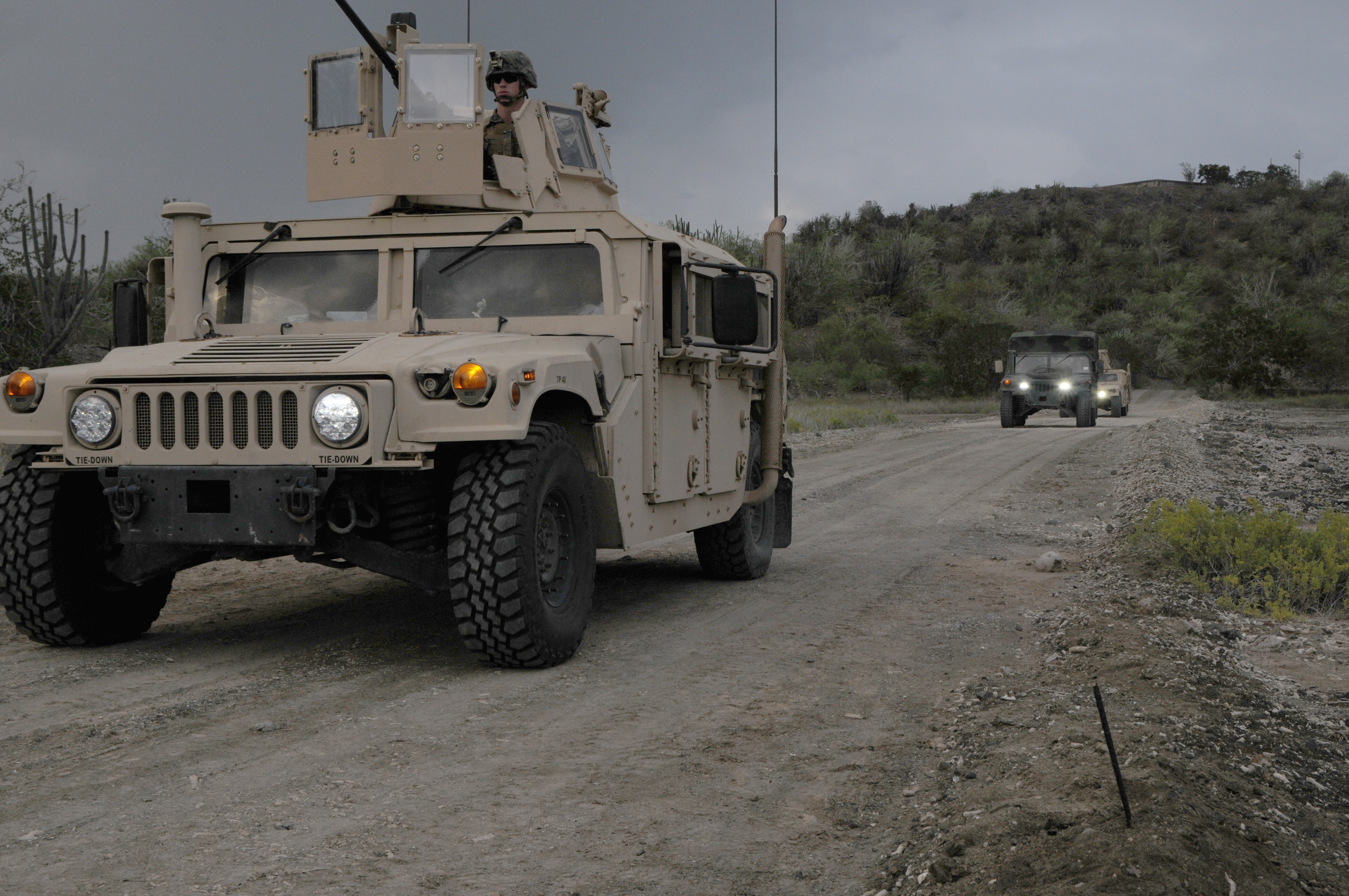
Coast Guard Port Security Unit and Marine Security Forces conducts convoy operations together.

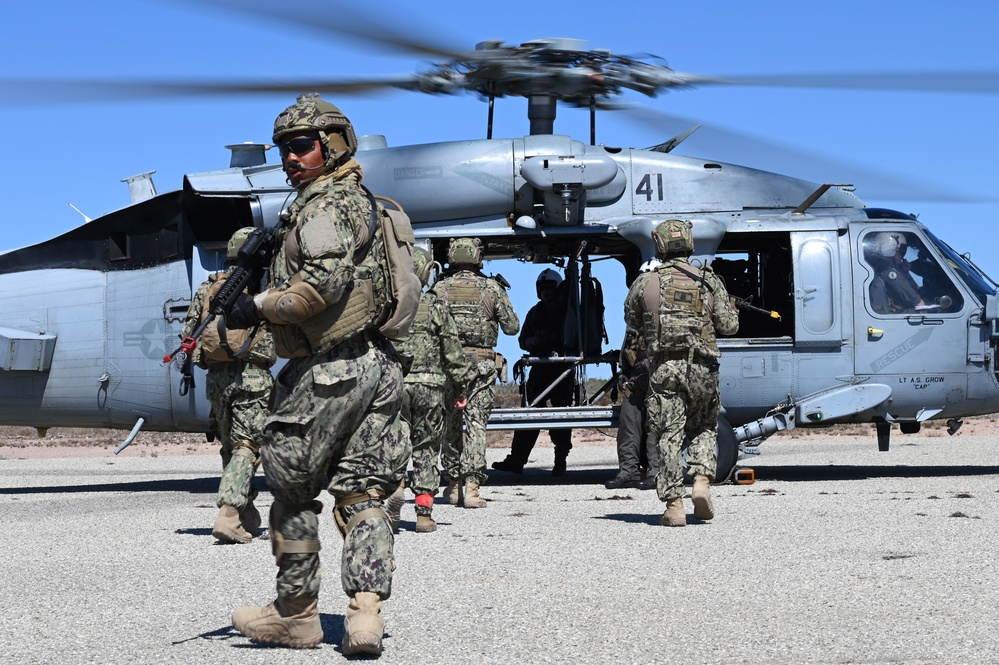
Port Security Unit helicopter extraction

Port Security Units are the Coast Guard's expeditionary forces and serve as a rapid reaction force, capable of worldwide deployment on short notice. They can deploy within 96 hours and establish operations within 24 hours of arrival. They provide security for forward-deployed base camps and ports around the world where needed. Some of the units' capabilities include, but are not limited to:

- Physical security
- Anti-piracy
- Maritime interdiction
- CBRN defense
- Military combat operations
- Humanitarian aid
- Amphibious warfare
- Point-defense of strategic shipping routes, designated critical infrastructure, and high value assets

== Equipment ==
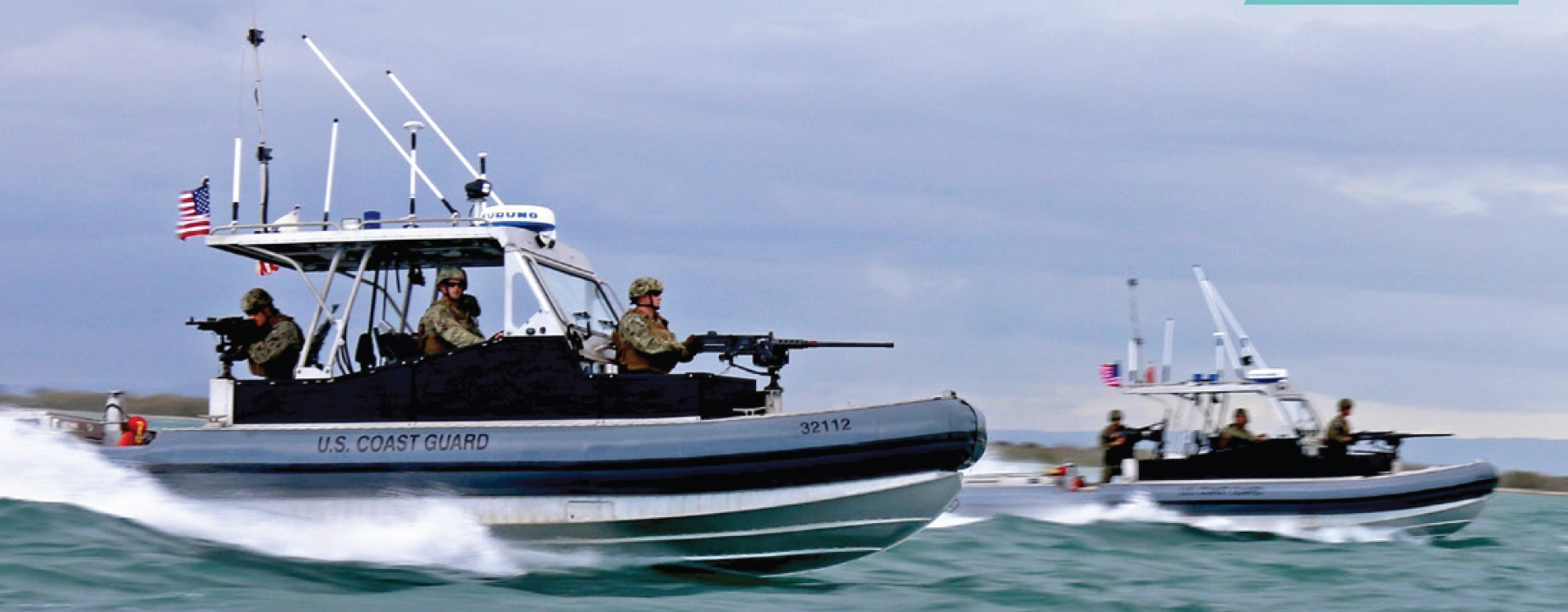
A pair of 32-foot Transportable Port Security Boats (TPSB) in Guantanamo Bay, Cuba, 2015

Each Port Security Unit has several fast and maneuverable 32-foot Transportable Port Security Boats. Each unit is outfitted with spare material, pick-up trucks, boat trailers, transportable kitchens, tents, and Department of Defense-compatible radios. They maintain an inventory of equipment and spare parts to sustain operations for up to 90 days. Ongoing logistics support provides routine replenishment. All personnel have individual gear for field operations.

The PSU has a large suite of weapons available to them, compared to most Coast Guard units. Members of the Waterside Security Division and Shoreside Security Division use a variety of light and crew-served weapons, including 7.62 mm M240 machine guns, .50 caliber Browning machine guns, M4 carbines, 9mm Glock 19 and SIG Sauer P229R DAK service pistols, 40 mm M203 grenade launchers, and 12-gauge Remington 870 shotguns.

== Organization ==
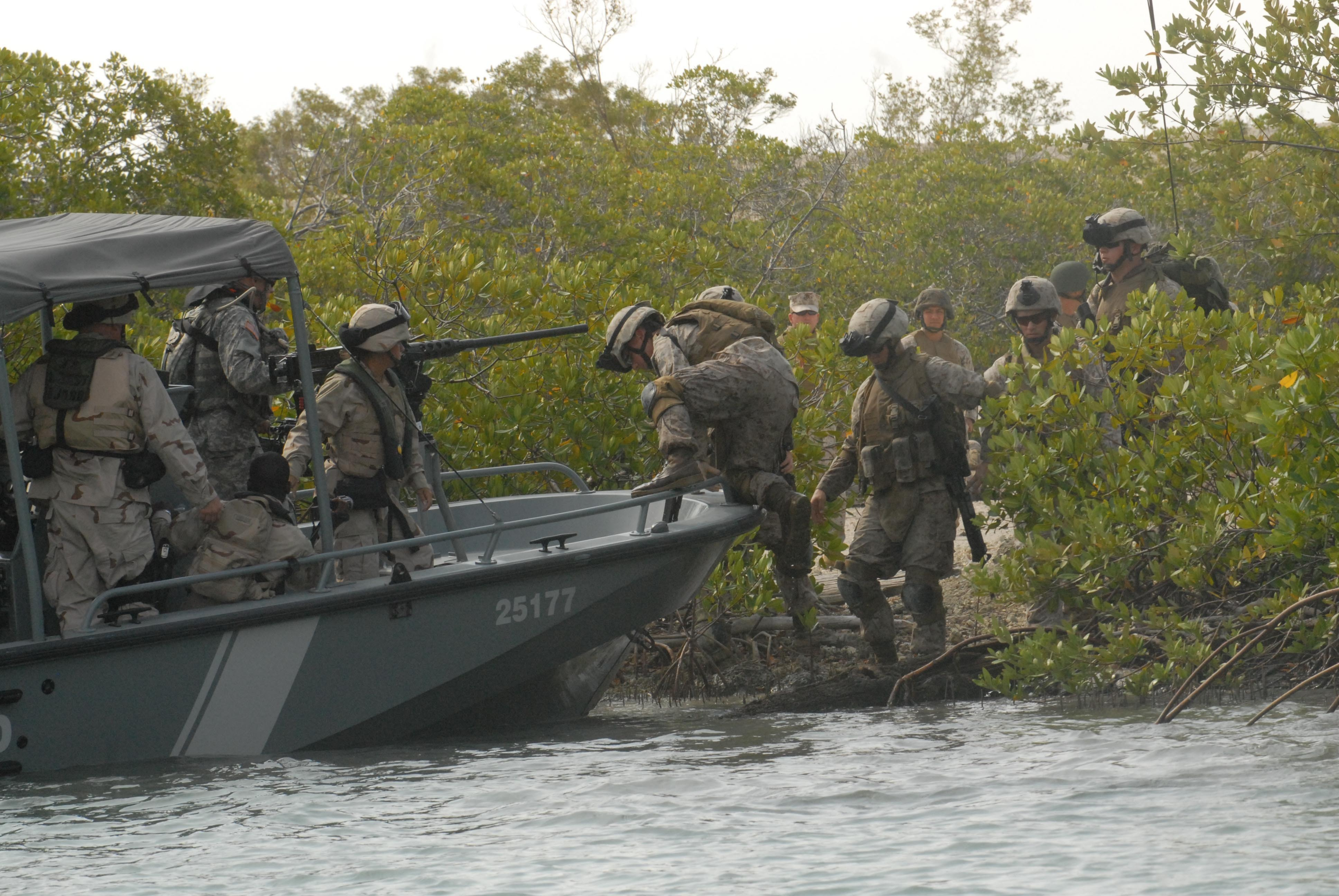
Port Security Unit 305, extract Marine Security Forces (FAST) Company during a joint training exercise.

Each Port Security Unit is staffed by 150-200 reservists and several active-duty personnel, including at least one active-duty officer and five active-duty first-class petty officer. Personnel prepare for contingency operations during monthly drills while undergoing inactive-duty training (IDT) and normally participate in exercises and specialized training during their annual active-duty training (ADT).

There are 8 Port Security Units:

- PSU 301: Joint Base Cape Cod, Massachusetts
- PSU 305: Joint Base Langley–Eustis, Virginia
- PSU 307: Coast Guard Air Station Clearwater, Florida
- PSU 308: Stennis International Airport, Mississippi
- PSU 309: Camp Perry, Ohio
- PSU 311: Coast Guard Base Los Angeles/Long Beach, California
- PSU 312: Coast Guard Base Alameda, California
- PSU 313: Naval Station Everett, Washington

PSUs may operate independently or support, train, or integrate with other units, such as:

- United States Navy: Navy Expeditionary Combat Command elements including Maritime Expeditionary Security Force, Seabees, and Explosive Ordnance Disposal Detachments.
- United States Marine Corps: Marine Corps Security Force Regiment and Fleet Anti-terrorism Security Team
- United States Army: Special Operations, Security Force Assistance Brigade, and Military Police
- United States Air Force: Security Forces and DAGRE

=== Waterside Security Division ===
The Waterside Security Division (WSD) is equipped with six Kvichak (Vigor) 32-foot Transportable Port Security Boats (TPSBs), which are the fourth generation of the TPSBs used by the Coast Guard for the port security missions. These boats are armed with three mounted machine guns, in addition to the crew's personal weapons.

The main purpose of the Waterside Security Division is to provide maritime protection to key high-value assets (HVAs), such as warships and military supply vessels, military bases, ports, harbors, and piers. Through the use of vigilant escort and patrol techniques, the HVA is protected from asymmetric threats, such as small-boat assaults or swimmers.

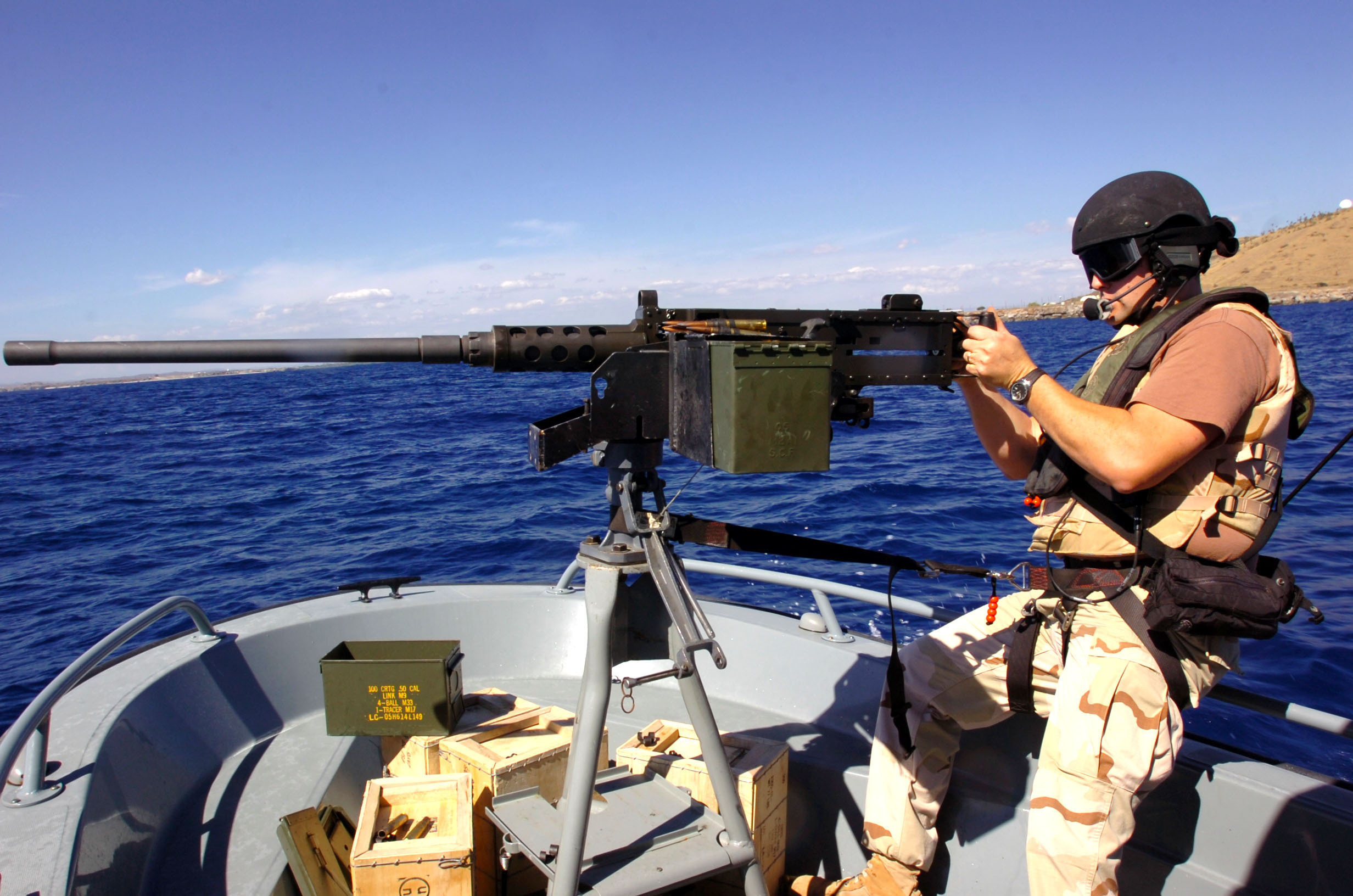
Coast Guard Reserve Port Security Unit 305, fires a Browning M-2 .50-caliber

The Waterside Security Division consists of boatswain's mates, gunner's mates, machinery technicians, and Maritime Law Enforcement Specialists, led by a division officer and assistant division officer. Each TPSB is crewed by enlisted personnel, consisting of a Tactical Coxswain and Tactical Boat Crew members, one of whom is a qualified engineer.

=== Shoreside Security Division ===
The Shoreside Security Division (SSD) is the ground element of the PSUs. It is often tasked with protecting vessels in security zones and pier areas and providing security for internal unit functions, such as joint command areas, communications centers, berthing areas, entry control points (ECP), and vehicle control points (VCP). SSD personnel are also trained in defensive fighting position construction, convoy operations, individual movements, and patrolling.

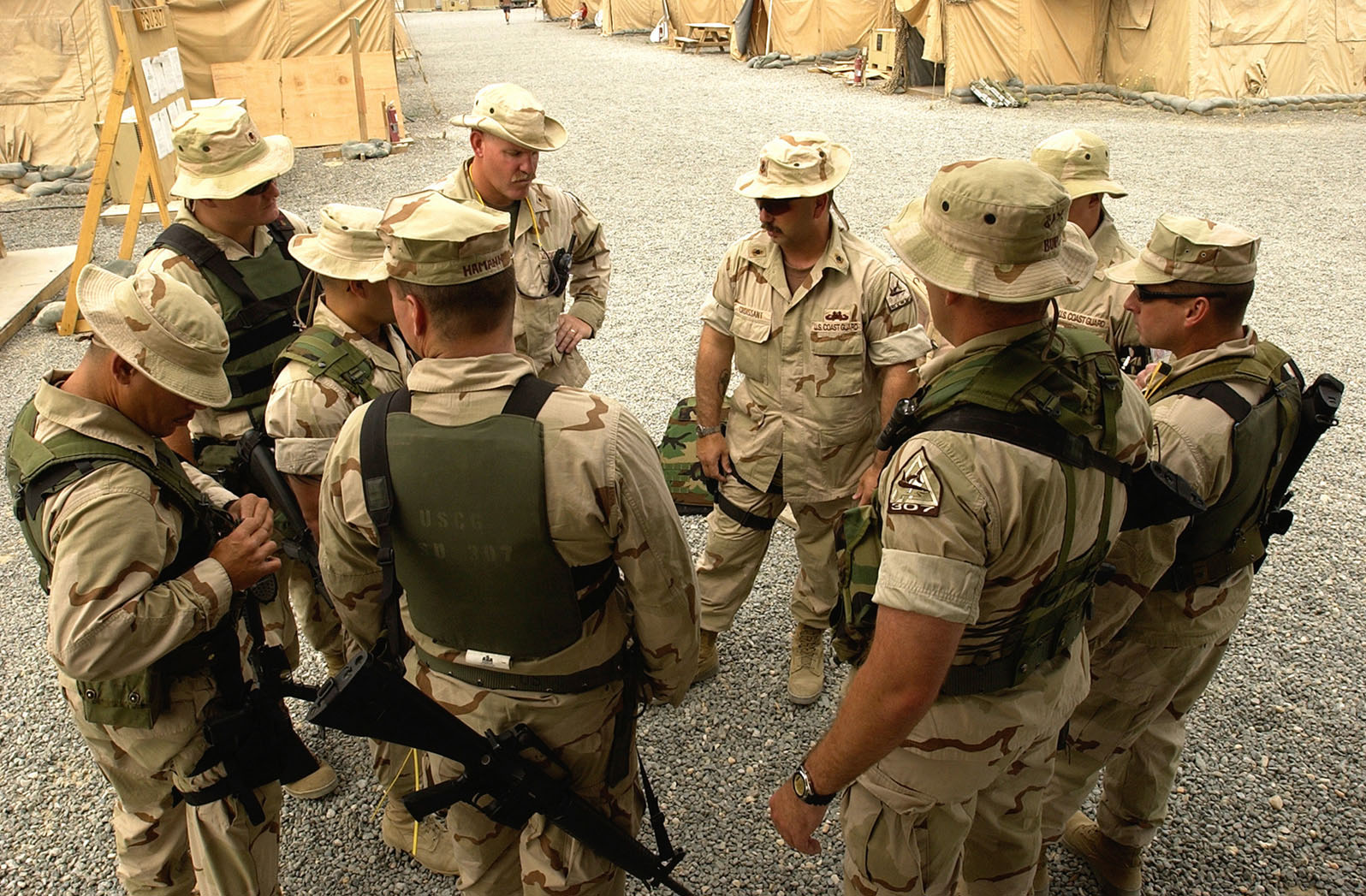
Members of Coast Guard PSU 307 from Clearwater, Florida deployed to the Middle East region to help protect the Port of Ash Shuaiba (2004)

The Shoreside Security Division consists of Maritime Law Enforcement Specialists, led by a division officer and an assistant division officer. It is subdivided into squads with 3 four-person fireteams each. Each squad and fireteam has a designated leader.

=== Weapons Division ===
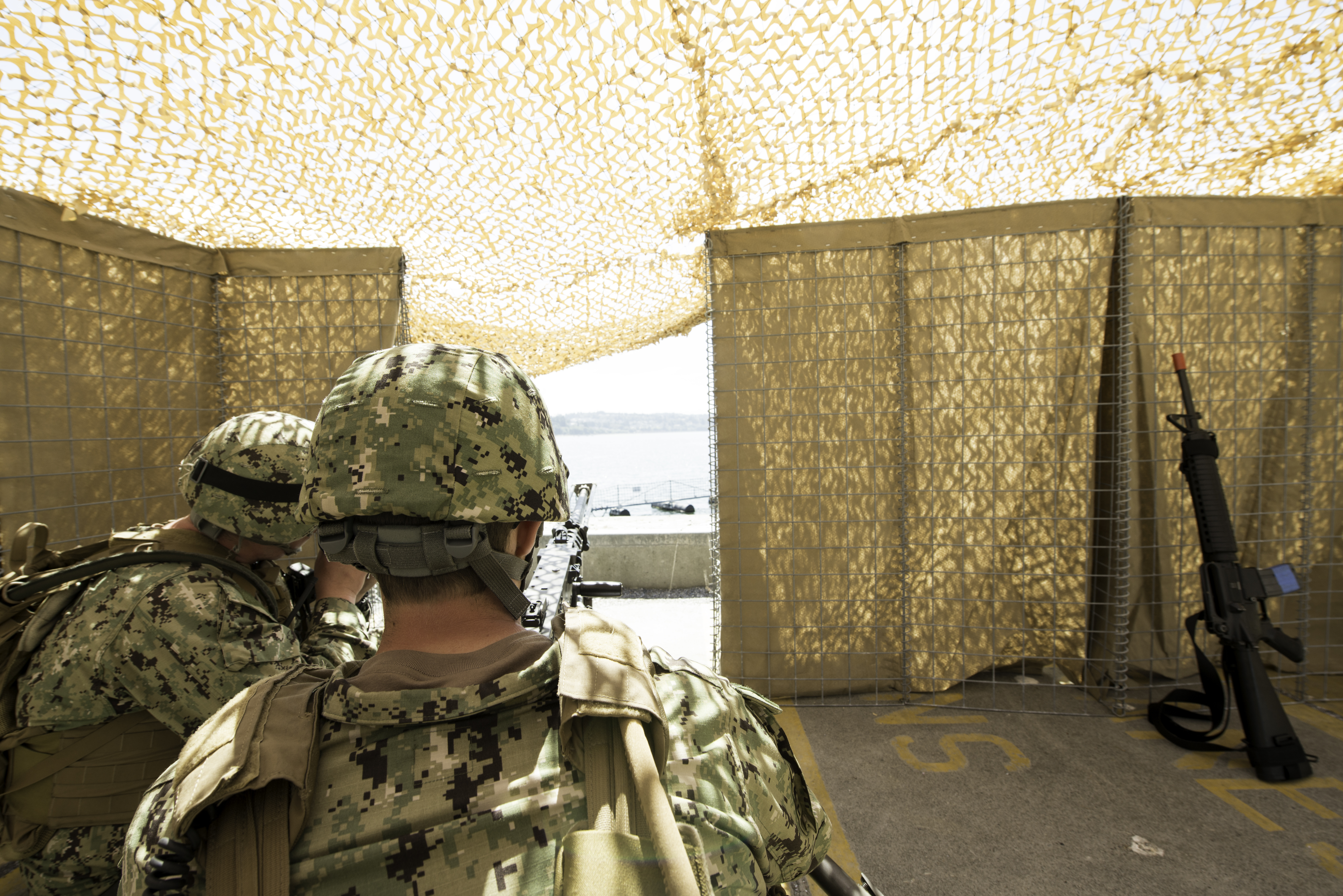
Port Security Unit 313, operating the M2 .50-caliber machine gun during an exercise

The Weapons Division ensures that the unit is properly armed, equipped, and trained for exercises, operations, or incidents to which the PSU may respond. The Weapons Division consists of a weapons officer and multiple gunner's mates.

== Operations ==
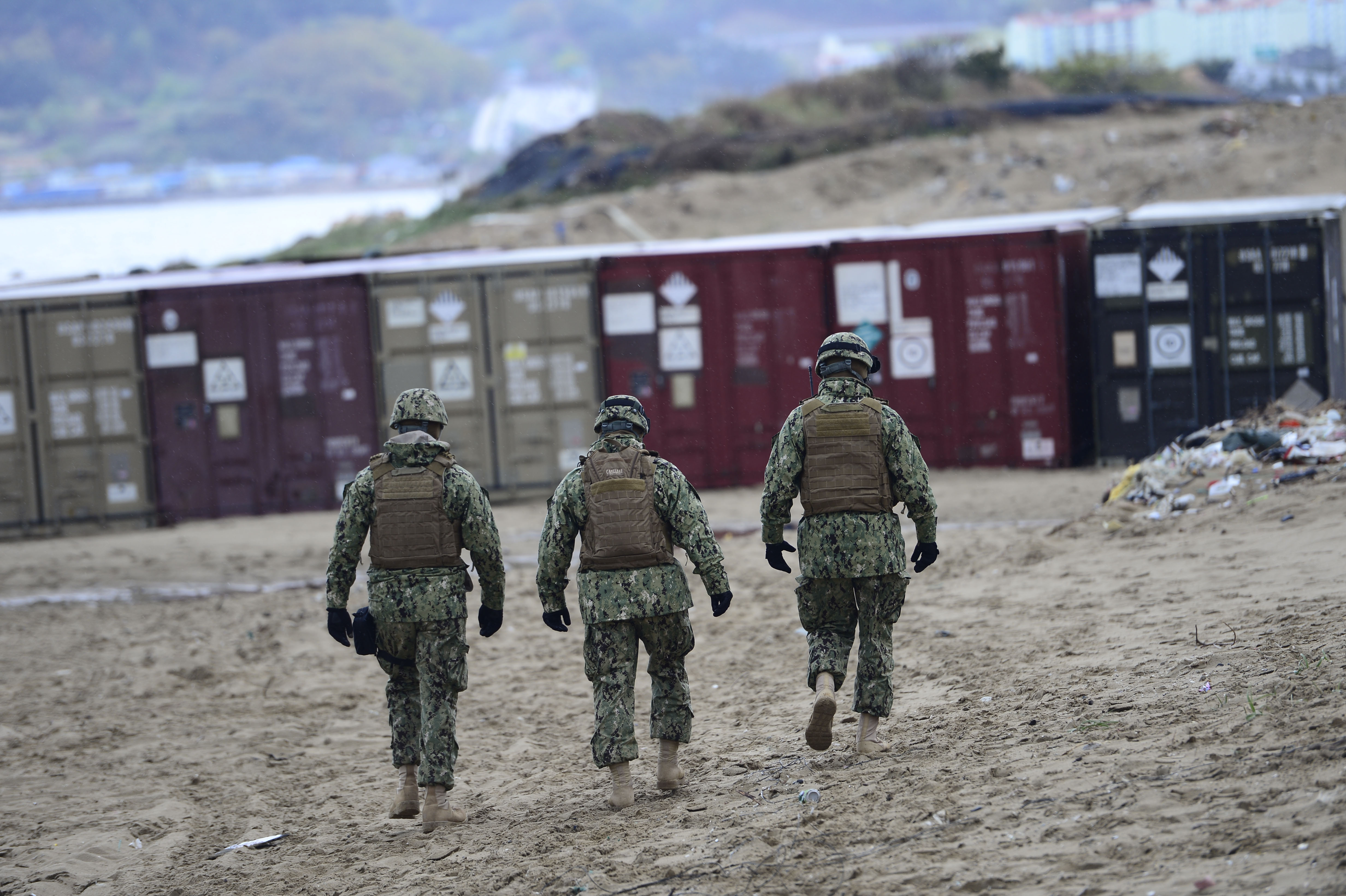
Port Security Unit 313 in Pohang, South Korea

=== Sustainability ===
Port Security Units are capable of worldwide deployment in national defense and regional contingency environments. PSUs conduct layered defensive operations to protect high-value assets (HVAs) within the protected waters of a port or harbor. Operating environments include operations from shore sites, barges, or other moored platforms (including oil platforms). PSUs typically have enough supplies to operate between 15 and 30 days without resupply.

=== Support ===
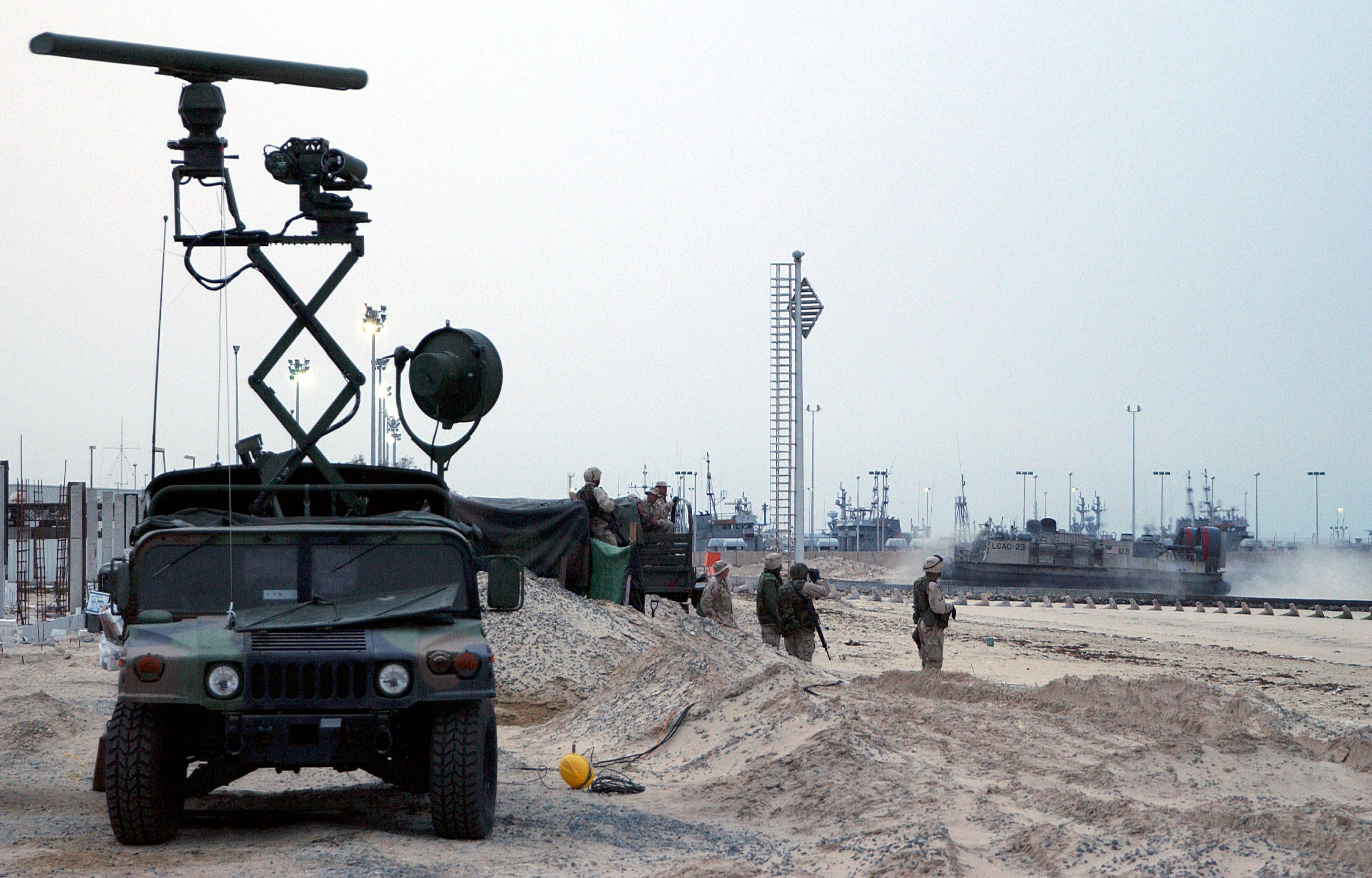
Coast Guard PSU 307 providing security for Navy Mobile Inshore Undersea Warfare Unit 206 and Seabees in Operation Iraqi Freedom

PSUs will normally operate independently, but may operate with the U.S. Navy Expeditionary Combat Command. PSUs are capable of conducting continuous boat operations with three or four boats underway simultaneously. An additional boat will be crewed and mechanically ready at all times, as a ready response boat. The remainder may be undergoing maintenance or repair, or used for spares. Replacement boat hulls can be expected to be on station (not including transit and maintenance time) within 18 hours when more than one boat is undergoing maintenance. During high-threat conditions, PSUs can conduct continuous operations with four operational boats for up to 24 hours.

== Port Security Qualification Badge ==
There are two qualification badges authorized for Port Security Unit members: enlisted members wear pewter-colored, and officers gold-colored, insignia. The badge is earned by only a small number of Coast Guardsmen (approximately 1%) and is primarily a Coast Guard Reserve qualification badge.

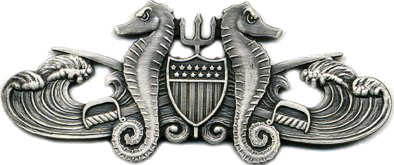
Port Security Enlisted Qualification Badge

The design for the pin was developed in 1991 by Reserve Coast Guardsman Storekeeper First Class Terry D. Jelcick while sitting on his bunk at Batar Camp, Dammam, Saudi Arabia, in the evenings after work. Jelcick is now retired and is a former member of PSU 312 based in San Francisco, California.

The parts of the insignia are:

- Coast Guard Shield: represents the Coast Guard authority.
- Trident: represents maritime defense, expeditionary, and victory.
- Crossed Swords: represent the PSUs operating in joint military environments.
- Seahorses: represent mobility.
- Waves: represent our seagoing heritage.

== See also ==
- Port Security Badge
- United States Coast Guard Reserve
- Maritime Safety and Security Team
- Law Enforcement Detachments
- Special Missions Training Center
- Maritime Force Protection Unit
- Patrol Forces Southwest Asia
