= Michigan's 110th House of Representatives district =

American legislative district

Michigan's 110th State House of Representatives district
Representative
| Gregory Markkanen; R–Hancock |
- Demographics: 91% White; 0.7% Black; 2.1% Hispanic; 1.5% Asian; 0.8% Native American; 0.1% Hawaiian/Pacific Islander; 0.7% Other; 3.1% Multiracial
- Population (2024): 91,055

Michigan's 110th House of Representatives district (also referred to as Michigan's 110th House district) is a legislative district within the Michigan House of Representatives located in part of Dickinson County, as well as all of Gogebic, Houghton, Iron, Keweenaw, and Ontonagon counties. The district was created in 1965, when the Michigan House of Representatives district naming scheme changed from a county-based system to a numerical one.

== List of representatives ==
| Representative | Party | Dates | Residence | Notes |
|---|---|---|---|---|
| Russell Hellman | Democratic | 1965–1980 | Dollar Bay | |
| Don Koivisto | Democratic | 1981–1986 | Mass City | |
| Richard A. Sofio | Democratic | 1987–1990 | Bessemer | |
| Stephen Dresch | Republican | 1991–1992 | Hancock | |
| Stephen Shepich | Democratic | 1993–1994 | Iron River | Resigned. |
| Paul Tesanovich | Democratic | 1994–2000 | L'Anse | |
| Rich Brown | Democratic | 2001–2006 | Bessemer | |
| Michael Lahti | Democratic | 2007–2010 | Hancock | |
| Matt Huuki | Republican | 2011–2012 | Atlantic Mine | |
| Scott Dianda | Democratic | 2013–2018 | Calumet | |
| Gregory Markkanen | Republican | 2019–present | Hancock | |

== Recent elections ==
=== 2020s ===
2026 Michigan House of Representatives election
| Party | Candidate | Votes | % |
|---|---|---|---|
| Republican | Gregory Markkanen (incumbent) | 24,235 | 58.96 |
| Democratic | Brian Irizarry | 16,871 | 41.04 |
| Total votes | | 41,106 | 100 |
| Republican hold | | | |

2024 Michigan House of Representatives election
| Party | Candidate | Votes | % |
|---|---|---|---|
| Republican | Gregory Markkanen | 31,583 | 63.1 |
| Democratic | Kim S. Corcoran | 18,493 | 36.9 |
| Total votes | | 50,076 | 100 |

2022 Michigan House of Representatives election
| Party | Candidate | Votes | % |
|---|---|---|---|
| Republican | Gregory Markkanen | 25,462 | 63.4 |
| Democratic | Casey VerBerkmoes | 14,732 | 36.7 |
| Total votes | | 40,194 | 100 |

2020 Michigan House of Representatives election
| Party | Candidate | Votes | % |
|---|---|---|---|
| Republican | Gregory Markkanen | 25,802 | 57.6 |
| Democratic | Janet Metsa | 18,457 | 41.2 |
| Green | Rick Sauermilch | 543 | 1.2 |
| Total votes | | 44,802 | 100 |

2018 Michigan House of Representatives election
| Party | Candidate | Votes | % |
|---|---|---|---|
| Republican | Gregory Markkanen | 17,980 | 50.8 |
| Democratic | Ken Summers | 17,401 | 49.2 |
| Total votes | | 35,381 | 100 |
| Republican gain from Democratic | | | |

2016 Michigan House of Representatives election
| Party | Candidate | Votes | % |
|---|---|---|---|
| Democratic | Scott Dianda | 23,532 | 61.1 |
| Republican | Gregory Markkanen | 15,016 | 39.0 |
| Total votes | | 38,548 | 100 |
| Democratic hold | | | |

2014 Michigan House of Representatives election
| Party | Candidate | Votes | % |
|---|---|---|---|
| Democratic | Scott Dianda | 16,415 | 60.7 |
| Republican | Bob Michaels | 10,614 | 39.3 |
| Total votes | | 27,029 | 100 |
| Democratic hold | | | |

2012 Michigan House of Representatives election
| Party | Candidate | Votes | % |
|---|---|---|---|
| Democratic | Scott Dianda | 19,992 | 51.6 |
| Republican | Matt Huuki | 18,759 | 48.4 |
| Total votes | | 38,751 | 100 |
| Democratic gain from Republican | | | |

2010 Michigan House of Representatives election
| Party | Candidate | Votes | % |
|---|---|---|---|
| Republican | Matt Huuki | 16,031 | 55.6 |
| Democratic | Scott Dianda | 12,814 | 44.4 |
| Total votes | | 28,845 | 100 |
| Republican gain from Democratic | | | |

2008 Michigan House of Representatives election
| Party | Candidate | Votes | % |
|---|---|---|---|
| Democratic | Michael Lahti | 26,991 | 70.5 |
| Republican | John Larson | 11,302 | 29.5 |
| Total votes | | 38,293 | 100 |
| Democratic hold | | | |

== Historical district boundaries ==
| Map | Description | Apportionment Plan | Notes |
|---|---|---|---|
| | Gogebic County (part); Bessemer; Bessemer Township; Erwin Township; Ironwood; Ironwood Township; Wakefield; Wakefield Township; Houghton County; Keweenaw County; Ontonagon County | 1964 Apportionment Plan | |
| | Baraga County (part); Spurr Township; Gogebic County; Houghton County (part); Excluding; Duncan Township; Laird Township; Iron County (part); Excluding; Hematite Township; Keweenaw County; Ontonagon County | 1972 Apportionment Plan | |
| | Gogebic County; Houghton County; Iron County; Keweenaw County; Ontonagon County | 1982 Apportionment Plan | |
| | Baraga County; Gogebic County; Houghton County; Iron County; Keweenaw County; Ontonagon County | 1992 Apportionment Plan | |
| | Baraga County; Gogebic County; Houghton County; Iron County; Keweenaw County; Marquette County (part); Powell Township; Ontonagon County | 2001 Apportionment Plan | |
| | Baraga County; Gogebic County; Houghton County; Iron County; Keweenaw County; Marquette County (part); Ishpeming Township; Powell Township; Ontonagon County | 2011 Apportionment Plan | |
