= Gogebic Community College =

Public college in Ironwood, Michigan, US

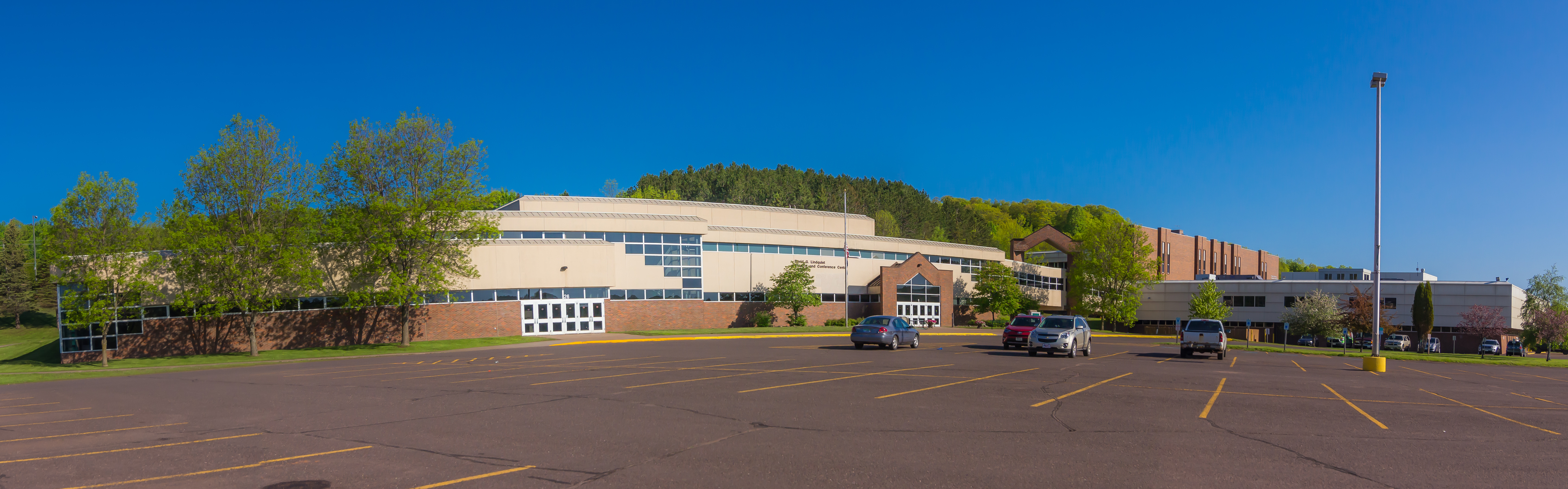
- Type: Public community college
- Established: 1932
- Academic affiliations: North Central Association of Colleges and Schools and Michigan Community College Association
- President: Chris Patritto
- Faculty: 40
- Students: 846
- Location: Ironwood, Michigan, U.S. 46.4721°N 90.1655°W
- Campus: Rural
- Colors: Green and white
- Nickname: Samsons
- Website: www.gogebic.edu

Gogebic Community College (GCC) is a public community college in Ironwood, Michigan. Founded as Ironwood Junior College in 1932, the college has a main campus in Ironwood and a site in Houghton, Michigan to serve Houghton County and the surrounding area.

The college offers two-year associate's degrees, a variety of certification programs, occupational training, and other learning opportunities for the surrounding community. For the 2013–2014 academic year, the school had 1097 students, of which 18% were from outside Michigan and 6% were from minority groups. Estimated costs for the freshman year are $15,328 for Michigan residents and $16,486 for non-Michigan residents. The college operates on a semester schedule.

== Campuses ==
=== Ironwood location (main campus) ===
The main campus is located in Ironwood, Michigan, and has three principal classroom buildings: the Rutger Erickson Academic Building, the Carl Kleimola Technical Center, and the Jacob Solin Center for Business Education as well as the Skilled Trades Building located just off-campus on Greenbush and the Building Trades Annex across the street on Jackson Road. Gogebic's campus is also the home of Mount Zion Recreational Complex, which is owned and operated by the college, and run by students, staff, and faculty from the school's Ski Area Management program.

The David G. Lindquist Student Center includes the gymnasium and home court of the Samson basketball and Volleyball teams while serving as the practice facility for the women's softball team. The facility boasts an indoor cushioned walking track, aerobics studio, weight rooms, student lounge, game area, snack bar/concessions, and the Courtside Cafe.

=== Houghton location ===
Gogebic Community College provides courses throughout the day and evening at the Copper Country Center located in the Copper Country Mall in Houghton, Michigan.

== Student life ==
There are several student groups on campus including Student Senate, Phi Theta Kappa, Cru, ADAPT (Alcohol, Drug Awareness and Prevention Team), The Chieftain, Cheerleading, Creative Arts and Performance Club, and Intercollegiate Athletics.

The student newspaper for Gogebic Community College, The Chieftain, is published several times throughout the year.

The GCC Athletic Program fields three intercollegiate teams. The Gogebic Community College is a member of the National Junior College Athletic Association, Region XIII. The Samsons compete against teams in Michigan, Minnesota, Wisconsin and North Dakota in women's volleyball, men's and women's basketball, and co-ed Esports. Intramural sports include football, basketball, softball, tennis, golf, and bowling. The GCC athletic mascot is Sam the Samson (who is notably not a yeti).

== Notable alumni ==
- Steven E. Day, Coast Guard Rear Admiral (Lower Half)
- Jay W. Johnson, former member of the United States House of Representatives from Wisconsin (1997–1999) and 36th Director of the United States Mint.
- Richard A. Sofio, Michigan state representative and educator
