= Stephen Shepich =

American politician

Member of the Michigan House of Representatives from the 110th district
- In office January 1, 1993 – January 25, 1994
- Preceded by: Stephen Dresch
- Succeeded by: Paul Tesanovich

Personal details
- Born: October 12, 1948 Stambaugh, Michigan
- Died: October 24, 2013 (aged 65) Iron River, Michigan
- Party: Democratic
- Spouse: Jo
- Education: Michigan State University (B.S.); Northern Michigan University (B.S.)

Stephen V. "Steve" Shepich (October 12, 1948 – October 24, 2013) was a Democratic member of the Michigan House of Representatives.

Served as a budget analyst for the Michigan House Fiscal Agency. He and several of his associates were prosecuted for fraudulent activity. He plea bargained to charges of fraudulent travel reimbursement while on the staff of the Michigan House Fiscal Agency, resigning his seat as part of the deal. He was succeeded by fellow Democrat Paul Tesanovich.

He died October 24, 2013.
