= Runnymede-class landing craft =

Landing craft in the United States Army

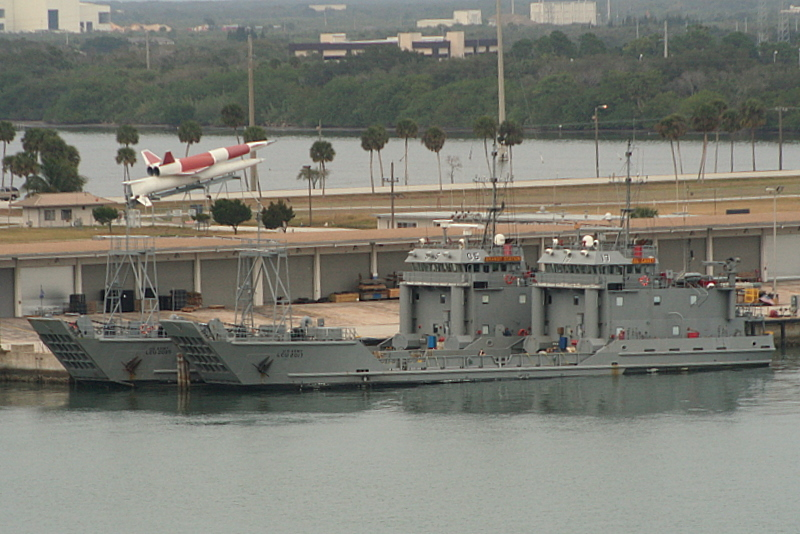
- Runnymede-class large landing craft docked at Port Canaveral, Florida

Class overview
- Builders: VT Halter Marine, Inc.
- Operators: United States Army
- In commission: 1990–present
- Planned: 35
- Completed: 35
- Active: 35

General characteristics
- Type: Landing Craft Utility
- Displacement: 575 long tons (584 t) light; 1,087 long tons (1,104 t) full load
- Length: 174 ft (53 m)
- Beam: 42 ft (13 m)
- Draft: 9 ft (2.7 m) loaded; 8 ft (2.4 m) light; 4 ft (1.2 m)
- Speed: 12 knots (22 km/h; 14 mph) light; 10 knots (19 km/h; 12 mph) loaded
- Range: 10,000 nmi (19,000 km) at 12 kn (22 km/h) light; 6,500 nmi (12,000 km) at 10 kn (19 km/h) loaded
- Capacity: 350 short tons (318 t) (8 C-17 loads); 5 × M1 main battle tanks or 12 × (24 double-stacked) 20-foot (6 m) ISO containers
- Complement: 13

The Runnymede-class large landing craft are powered watercraft in the United States Army. They replaced older USN-design landing craft, and are a typical Landing Craft Utility design with a bow ramp and large aft superstructure. They transport rolling and tracked vehicles, containers, and outsized and general cargo from ships offshore to shore, as well as to areas that cannot be reached by oceangoing vessels (coastal, harbor, and intercoastal waterways). It can be self-deployed or transported aboard a float-on/float-off vessel. It is classed for coastal service and one-man engine room operations and does not carry a U.S. Coast Guard COI (certificate of inspection) and is classified under 46 CFR subchapter C-uninspected. The vessel's hull is built to and classed to American Bureau of Shipping (ABS) load line rules, although machinery installations generally met ABS machinery rules when built, the vessels systems are not classed by ABS. The vessel can sustain a crew of 2 warrant officers and 11 enlisted personnel for up to 18 days, and 10,000 miles. This class is also equipped with an aft anchor to assist in retracting from the beach. Several are deployed to Europe and aboard Afloat Prepositioning Ships.

== Ships ==
- USAV Runnymede (LCU 2001)
- USAV Kennesaw Mountain (LCU 2002)
- USAV Macon (LCU 2003)
- USAV Stoney Point (LCU 2004) (formerly Aldie)
- USAV Brandy Station (LCU 2005)
- USAV Bristoe Station (LCU 2006)
- USAV Broad Run (LCU 2007)
- USAV Buena Vista (LCU 2008)
- USAV Calaboza (LCU 2009)
- USAV Cedar Run (LCU 2010)
- USAV Wilson Wharf (LCU 2011) (formerly Chickahominy)
- USAV Chickasaw Bayou (LCU 2012)
- USAV Churubusco (LCU 2013)
- USAV Coamo (LCU 2014)
- USAV Contreras (LCU 2015)
- USAV Corinth (LCU 2016)
- USAV El Caney (LCU 2017)
- USAV Five Forks (LCU 2018)
- USAV Fort Donelson (LCU 2019)
- USAV Fort McHenry (LCU 2020)
- USAV Great Bridge (LCU 2021)
- USAV Chattanooga (LCU 2022) (formerly Harpers Ferry )
- USAV Hobkirk (LCU 2023)
- USAV Hormigueros (LCU 2024)
- USAV Kings Mountain (LCU 2025) (formerly Malvern Hill)
- USAV Matamoros (LCU 2026)
- USAV Vigilant Warrior (LCU 2027) (formerly Mechanicsville)
- USAV Missionary Ridge (LCU 2028)
- USAV Molino Del Rey (LCU 2029)
- USAV Monterrey (LCU 2030)
- USAV New Orleans (LCU 2031)
- USAV Palo Alto (LCU 2032)
- USAV Paulus Hook (LCU 2033)
- USAV Perryville (LCU 2034)
- USAV Port Hudson (LCU 2035)
