= National Register of Historic Places listings in Gogebic County, Michigan =

Location of Gogebic County in Michigan

This is a list of the National Register of Historic Places listings in Gogebic County, Michigan.

This is intended to be a complete list of the properties and districts on the National Register of Historic Places in Gogebic County, Michigan, United States. Latitude and longitude coordinates are provided for many National Register properties and districts; these locations may be seen together in a map.

There are 11 properties and districts listed on the National Register in the county.

This National Park Service list is complete through NPS recent listings posted August 7, 2026.

== Current listings ==
	Name on the Register	Image	Date listed	Location	City or town	Description
1	Chicago and Northwestern Railroad Depot	Chicago and Northwestern Railroad Depot	January 14, 1985 (#85000095)	Between Suffolk and Lowell Sts. 46°27′21″N 90°10′12″W	Ironwood	This depot was built in 1892 by the Milwaukee, Lake Shore and Western Railroad, a predecessor of the Chicago and North Western Railway. The red brick and sandstone structure with a one-block long platform was used for passenger traffic until 1970, and freight until 1971. It currently houses the Ironwood Area Historical Society.
2	Copper Peak	Copper Peak	January 4, 1973 (#73000948)	N. Black River Valley Parkway; 46°35′47″N 90°05′26″W	Ironwood	Copper Peak, built in 1969, is the only ski flying hill in the Western Hemisphere. It was used for competitions between 1970 and 1994.
3	Solomon S. Curry House	Solomon S. Curry House	April 22, 1982 (#82002833)	631 E. McLeod Ave. 46°27′21″N 90°09′41″W	Ironwood	Solomon S. Curry was the president of the Metropolitan Iron and Land Company, which began extensive mining in the Gogebic Range in the early 1880s. The iron mines in the area led to the establishment of Ironwood, and Curry was one of the founding fathers of the city. After a devastating 1887 fire, Curry built this vernacular Queen Anne house for his own use.
4	Gogebic County Courthouse	Gogebic County Courthouse	May 8, 1981 (#81000306)	200 N. Moore St. 46°28′56″N 90°03′11″W	Bessemer	Gogebic County was split from Ontonagon County in 1887. The county immediately started work on a courthouse, a rectangular Romanesque red sandstone building designed by the firm of Charlton and Kuenzli and constructed in 1888 for $50,000. The courthouse, built when Gogebic County was a booming mining area, and reflects the economic prosperity of the times and the enthusiasm of county residents at a time when Gogebic County was a newly created political entity.
5	Ironwood Carnegie Library	Ironwood Carnegie Library	December 22, 2011 (#11000948)	235 E. Aurora St. 46°27′08″N 90°10′20″W	Ironwood	The Ironwood Carnegie Library was constructed in 1901, using a $17000 grant from Andrew Carnegie. It was the first Carnegie Library in Michigan, and continues to operate.
6	Ironwood City Hall	Ironwood City Hall	November 28, 1980 (#80001856)	McLeod Ave. and Norfolk St. 46°27′16″N 90°09′58″W	Ironwood	The city of Ironwood was first settled in 1885 as the commercial center of the newly opening Gogebic iron range. The city was incorporated in 1889, and architect George Mennie designed this city hall, which was constructed the following year. The two-story, rectangular, vernacular Richardsonian structure had an exterior of tan brick with smooth brownstone belt cornices. It originally held the city jail, police department, fire station, library, and city offices, but soon the police and fire departments exclusively used the building. Despite being listed on the National Register of Historic Places in 1980, the building was demolished in 1989.
7	Ironwood Theatre Complex	Ironwood Theatre Complex	January 11, 1985 (#85000061)	Aurora St. 46°27′14″N 90°10′09″W	Ironwood	The Ironwood Theatre opened in 1928, and featured first run films and vaudeville shows. It continued to show movies until 1982. In 1988, it was reopened as a non-profit cultural organization featuring a wide range of programming. The theatre houses a restored Barton Organ, one of only four still existing in playble condition.
8	Main Street – Black River Bridge	Main Street – Black River Bridge	December 9, 1999 (#99001514)	Main St. over Black River; 46°28′25″N 90°00′05″W	Bessemer Township	The Main Street – Black River Bridge was constructed in 1923 to replace a 19th-century bridge that was bottlenecking vehicular traffic in what was then the village of Ramsay. The concrete through girder bridge design used for this bridge was a standard Michigan State Highway Department design from 1913 through about 1930, during which time perhaps hundreds of them were built throughout the state. The Main Street – Black River Bridge is an unusual and visually striking example, having a triple-span design and tapered concrete piers.
9	Memorial Building	Memorial Building	November 10, 1980 (#80001857)	McLeod Ave. and Marquette St. 46°27′20″N 90°09′57″W	Ironwood	The Ironwood Memorial Building is a two-story Neoclassical structure, built to house the municipal offices of the city and as a recreational and social center. It also serves as a memorial for area men who served during the Civil War, Spanish–American War, and World War I, sontaining murals, statues, and stained glass windows honoring veterans.
10	Planter Road – Jackson Creek Bridge	Planter Road – Jackson Creek Bridge	December 9, 1999 (#99001515)	Planter Rd. over Jackson Creek; 46°30′48″N 89°58′12″W	Wakefield Township	The Planter Road – Jackson Creek Bridge is a steel plate girder bridge; a variety of bridge that was commonly used in states such as Pennsylvania and New York, but is relatively rare in Michigan.
11	Rice Bay	Rice Bay	December 2, 2015 (#15000353)	Indian Village Rd. 46°08′44″N 89°04′29″W	Watersmeet Township	Rice Bay, on the Michigan side of Lac Vieux Desert, contains a significant stand of wild rice traditionally managed and harvested by the Lac Vieux Desert Band of Lake Superior Chippewa Indians.

== See also ==
- List of National Historic Landmarks in Michigan
- National Register of Historic Places listings in Michigan
- Listings in neighboring counties: Ashland (WI), Iron, Iron (WI), Ontonagon, Vilas (WI)
