= Planter Road–Jackson Creek Bridge =

- Planter Road – Jackson Creek Bridge
- U.S. National Register of Historic Places
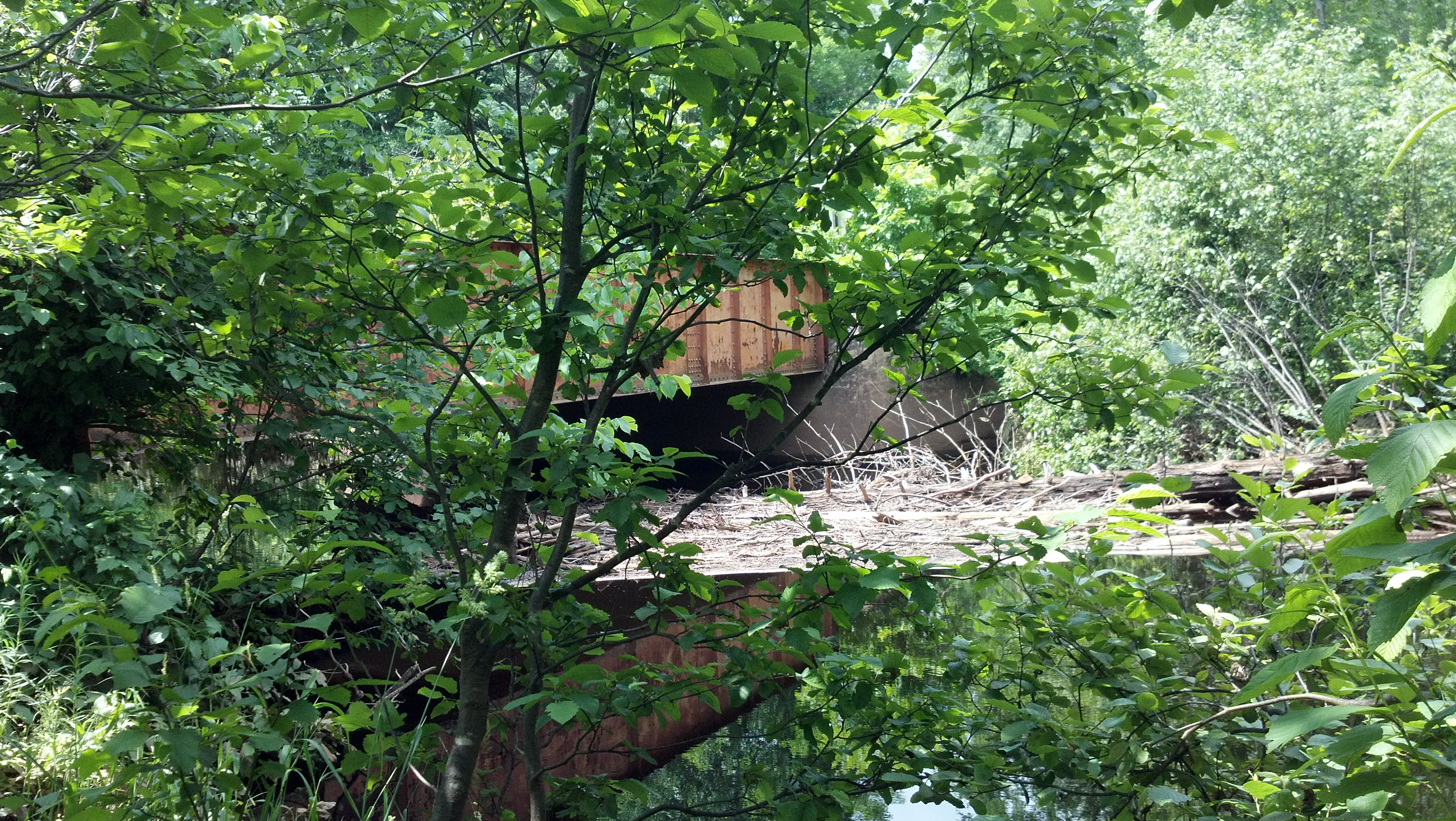
- Bridge as seen from bank

- Location within Michigan Location within the United States
- Interactive map
- Location: Planter Rd. over Jackson Creek, Wakefield Township, Michigan
- Coordinates: 46°30′48″N 89°58′12″W
- Area: less than one acre
- Built: 1923
- Architect: Michigan State Highway Dept.
- Architectural style: Through girder bridge
- MPS: Highway Bridges of Michigan MPS
- NRHP reference No.: 99001515
- Added to NRHP: December 9, 1999

The Planter Road – Jackson Creek Bridge is a bridge located on Planter Road over Jackson Creek in Wakefield Township, Michigan. It was listed on the National Register of Historic Places in 1999.

== Description ==
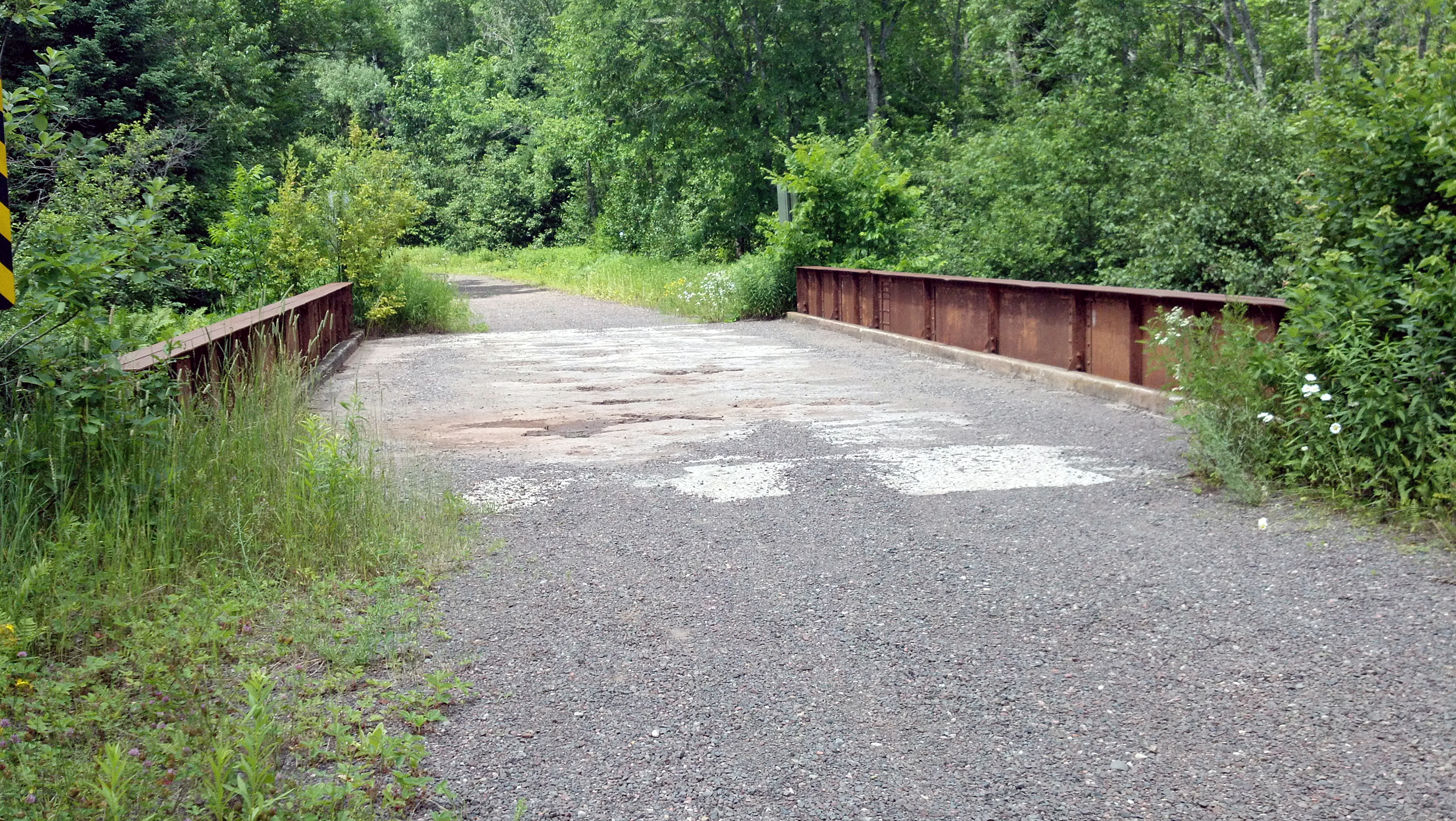
Bridge deck

The Planter Road – Jackson Creek Bridge is a 52 feet (16 m) long and 20 feet (6.1 m) wide steel plate girder bridge; a variety of bridge that was commonly used in states such as Pennsylvania and New York, but is relatively rare in Michigan. The superstructure contains two 50-foot through girders, made from a steel plate with riveted angle flanges and web stiffeners. The deck of the bridge supported by I-beam stringers, over which concrete is laid. The bridge is a strictly utilitarian structure, with no architectural detailing of any kind. No alterations have been made to the bridge, and it is in the original, well-preserved condition.

== History ==
The bridge was constructed in 1923 to provide access to the new community of Planter. The bridge uses a design from the Michigan State Highway Department that was first implemented in 1907-1908, but had been almost completely dropped by 1923. The bridge is one of the last remaining of this type in Michigan, and still carries vehicular traffic.

== See also ==
- National Register of Historic Places listings in Gogebic County, Michigan
