= Snowriver Mountain Resort =

Ski area in Michigan, United States

- Location: Wakefield Township, Michigan, United States
- Nearest city: Wakefield, Michigan
- Vertical: 543 feet (166 m)
- Top elevation: 1,743 ft (531 m)
- Base elevation: 1,201 ft (366 m)
- Skiable area: 195 acres (0.79 km^{2})
- Trails: Black River Basin: 27 Jackson Creek Summit: 43
- Longest run: 1-mile (1.6 km)
- Lift system: 6 double chairs, 1 high-speed six-person chair, 1 T-Bar, 1 carpet lift, 1 rope tow
- Lift capacity: 10,131 skiers/hr
- Terrain parks: Yes - 1 Big Chief Natural Terrain Park
- Snowfall: 17 ft (5.2 m) annual
- Snowmaking: Yes (90%)
- Night skiing: No
- Website: www.snowriver.com

Black River Basin
- Location within Michigan
- Location: Bessemer Township, Michigan, United States
- Nearest city: Bessemer, Michigan
- Coordinates: 46.5021°N 90.0046°W
- Vertical: 420 feet (130 m)
- Top elevation: 1,675 ft (511 m)
- Base elevation: 1,185 ft (361 m)
- Skiable area: 126 acres (0.51 km^{2})
- Trails: 22
- Lift system: 4 double chair lifts, 1 rope tow, 1 handle lift
- Terrain parks: Yes - 3
- Snowfall: 17 ft (5.2 m) annual
- Website: snowriver.com

Snowriver Mountain Resort is located in the Upper Peninsula of Michigan in Wakefield Township, Gogebic County. Snowriver Mountain Resort is in an area called "Big Snow Country", so named because of the annual 200-inch (5.1 m) average snowfall, courtesy of the lake effect from Lake Superior. It consists of the Jackson Creek Summit, formerly Indianhead Mountain, and Black River Basin, formerly known as Blackjack.

== History ==
The roots of Jackson Creek Summit tie in closely with the past and current economy of the area. In the late 1950s, Jack English, an amateur pilot from Chicago, flew over Indianhead Mountain. After seeing the abundant snow and area conditions, he developed "Indianhead Mountain Resort". This was the impetus for the local ski industry—in the following years, other resorts opened and the area became a skiing hotspot. English is credited with creating the ski industry in the area, and shifting the local economy away from the failing iron mines to one of the most popular ski destinations in the country. An indication of how important skiing has become to the region is Gogebic Community College's ski area management program, one of the few in the country.

In 2008, Indianhead acquired nearby Blackjack Mountain and Big Powderhorn Mountain, although Big Powderhorn was sold to a new owner at the end of 2009; In 2016, the parent company of the two resorts renamed itself "Big Snow Resorts."

In 2022, Midwestern Family Ski Resorts acquired Big Snow, and closed snowmobile trail 2 on the property. The company also owns Lutsen Mountains in Minnesota and Granite Peak Ski Area in Wisconsin, which are the largest mountains in each of their states. The combined resort was renamed "Snowriver" while "Indianhead Mountain" and "Blackjack Resort" were renamed "Jackson Creek Summit" and "Black River Basin".

== Winter activities ==
The area offers snowshoeing, ice skating, cross-country skiing and other winter activities. The area is best known for downhill alpine skiing. Jackson Creek Summit itself only offers downhill alpine skiing.

=== Skiing ===
==== Jackson Creek Summit ====
Jackson Creek Summit features runs from very easy greens through double diamond. Over 95% of the hill is groomed, and although there is no official tree skiing, adventurous skiers manage it anyway. There are 10 Beginner Green runs, seven More Difficult Blue runs, seven Most difficult Black runs, and four Expert Double Diamond runs primarily because of moguls.

The facilities normally found at the hill base are on top of the hill at Jackson Creek. This means that all skiing begins at the hill top, so your last lift ride for the day is up and off the hill. There are no accommodations at the base of the hill, but there are numerous trailside condos, hill top condos, and rental cabins in the area.

Youngsters under age nine years ski free with a paid adult.

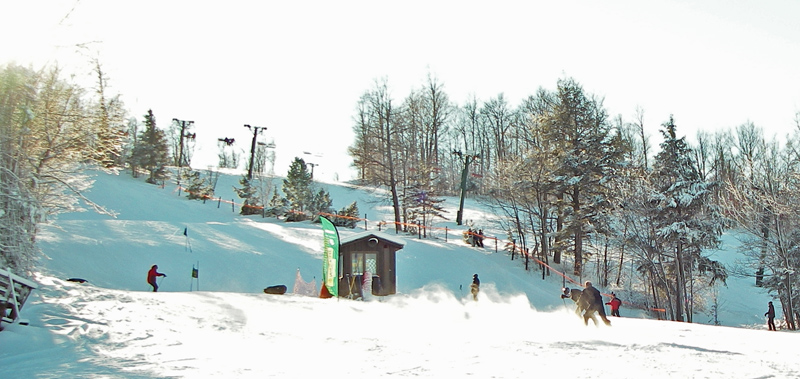
Base of NASTAR run

Amenities include the typical bars, snack areas and restaurant at the top of the hill, and a large restaurant / snack area at the base of the hill. There's also a ski shop, ski and board rentals, and lockers throughout the lodge.

The mountain is serviced by two double chairlifts, one high-speed six person lift, one T-bar lift, one rope tow, and one carpet lift.

The hill also offers NASTAR racing and has a ski school with private and group lessons. The NASTAR run has permanent course start and end structures for registration, start, timing, etc. on Sundance.

==== Black River Basin ====
Black River Basin has 22 downhill runs across 126 skiable acres. The runs are 20% Beginner, 40% Intermediate and 40% Expert, with one double black diamond expert trail. The area is unusual in that has three terrain parks and two glade trails allowing tree skiing for both adults and children.

== Summer activities ==
=== Hiking ===
The mountain is popular in the summer months with many hiking clubs and groups. Many clubs consider it a difficult, albeit enjoyable hike.

=== Wildlife ===
In May, the slopes become home to herds of Whitetail deer.

=== Waterfalls ===
The mountain is near the Black River, which provides access to some of the most well known waterfalls in the Western U.P.

== Events ==
=== Amsoil Championship Snocross 2013 ===
Blackjack Mountain hosted one of the 2013 Amsoil Championship SnoCross Races this race occurred from 12/6/13 to 12/7/13 and the race was named Northern Clearing SnoCross.

Snocross is the most exciting, fan friendly form of snowmobile racing. It combines the big-air jumps and exciting action of motocross with the crisp winter environment, providing snowbelt race fans with race action, world class athletes to cheer, and fun, family venues to visit. The action happens during a time of year and in geographic locations where it’s the premier race event of the season, on challenging, professionally designed and graded tracks.

== Fall colors ==
The views from the top of Jackson Creek Summit provide some of the best views of the Fall Colors. People travel from all over the world to see the varieties of Maple, Oak and other hardwoods change color. Jackson Creek Summit is on one of the many Fall Color Routes.

== Location ==
Jackson Creek Summit ski area is located in northwestern Michigan, 200 miles (320 km) northeast of Minneapolis St. Paul via I-35 to US 2, 110 miles (180 km) from Duluth, and 1.5 miles (2.4 km) from Wakefield.

== Photographs ==
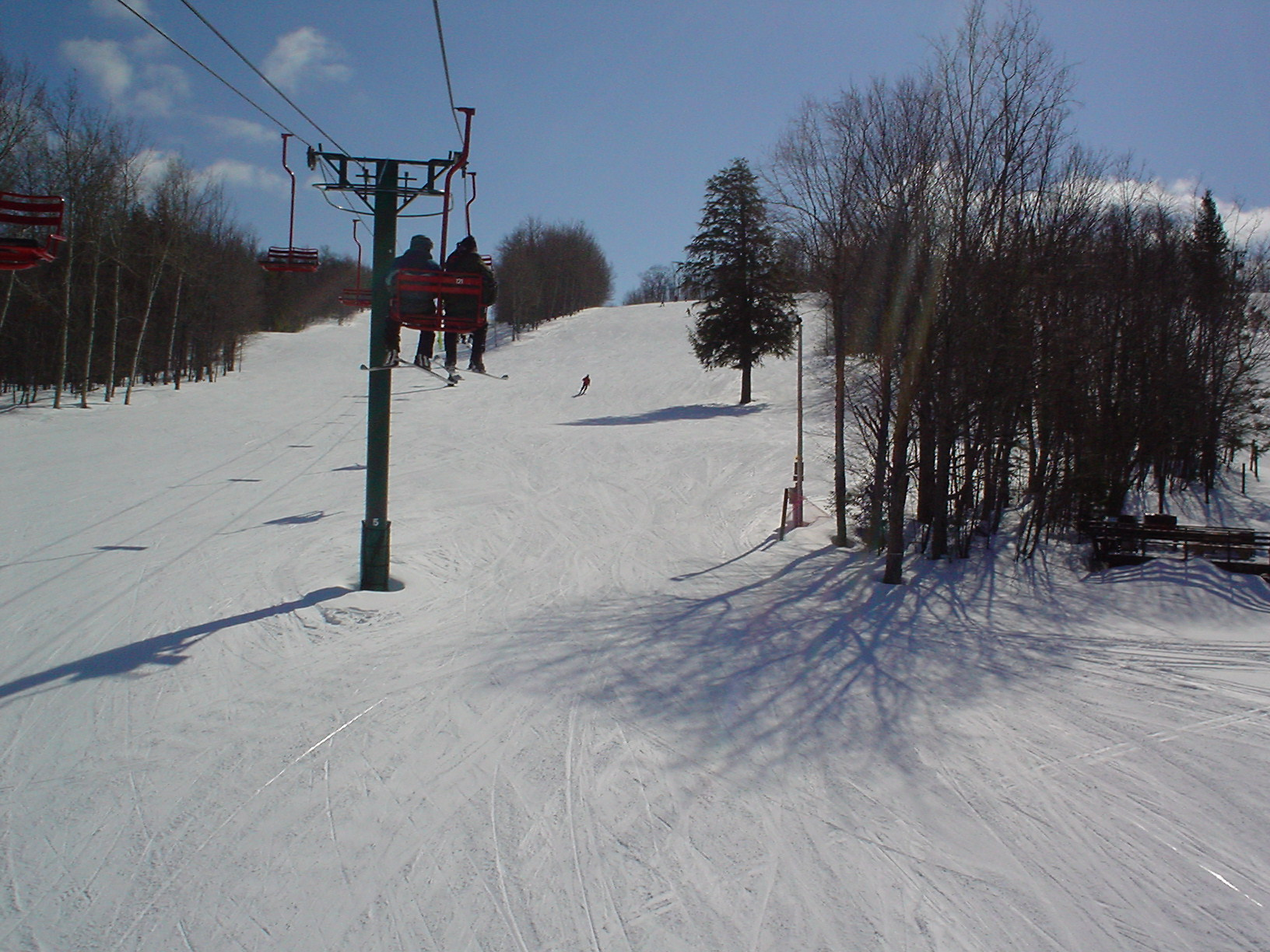
Trail Merge

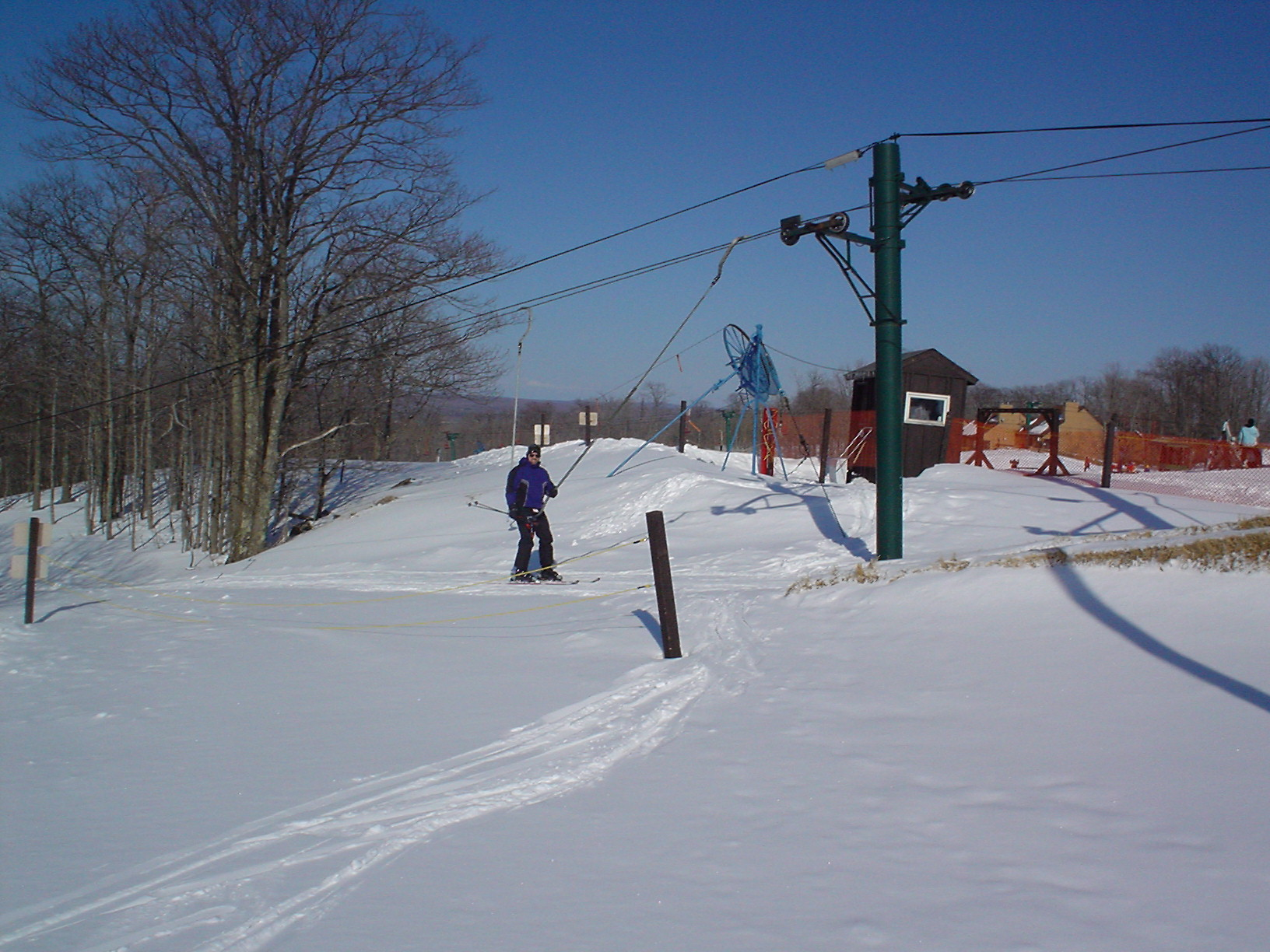
The Pomalift

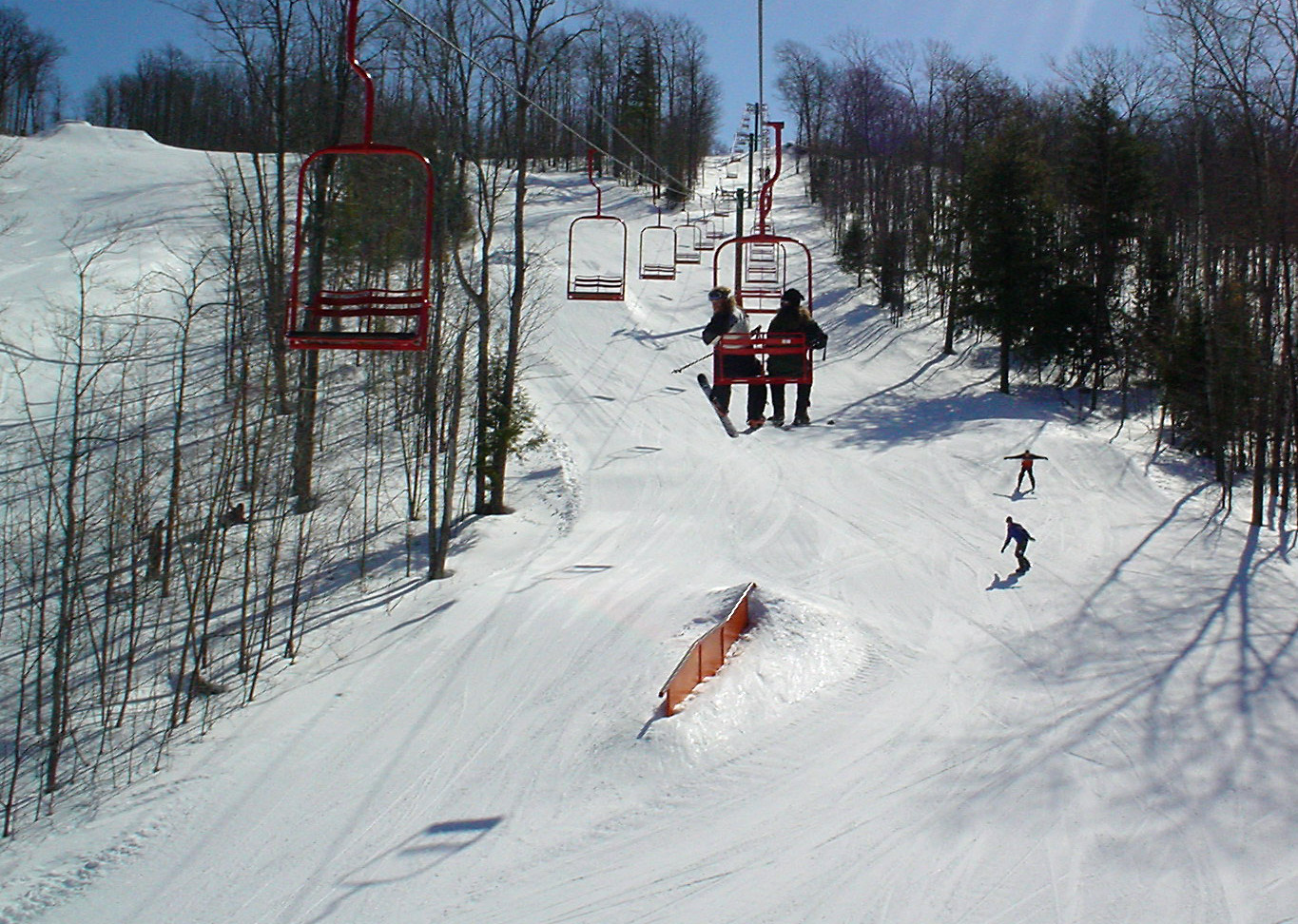
Part of the Terrain Park

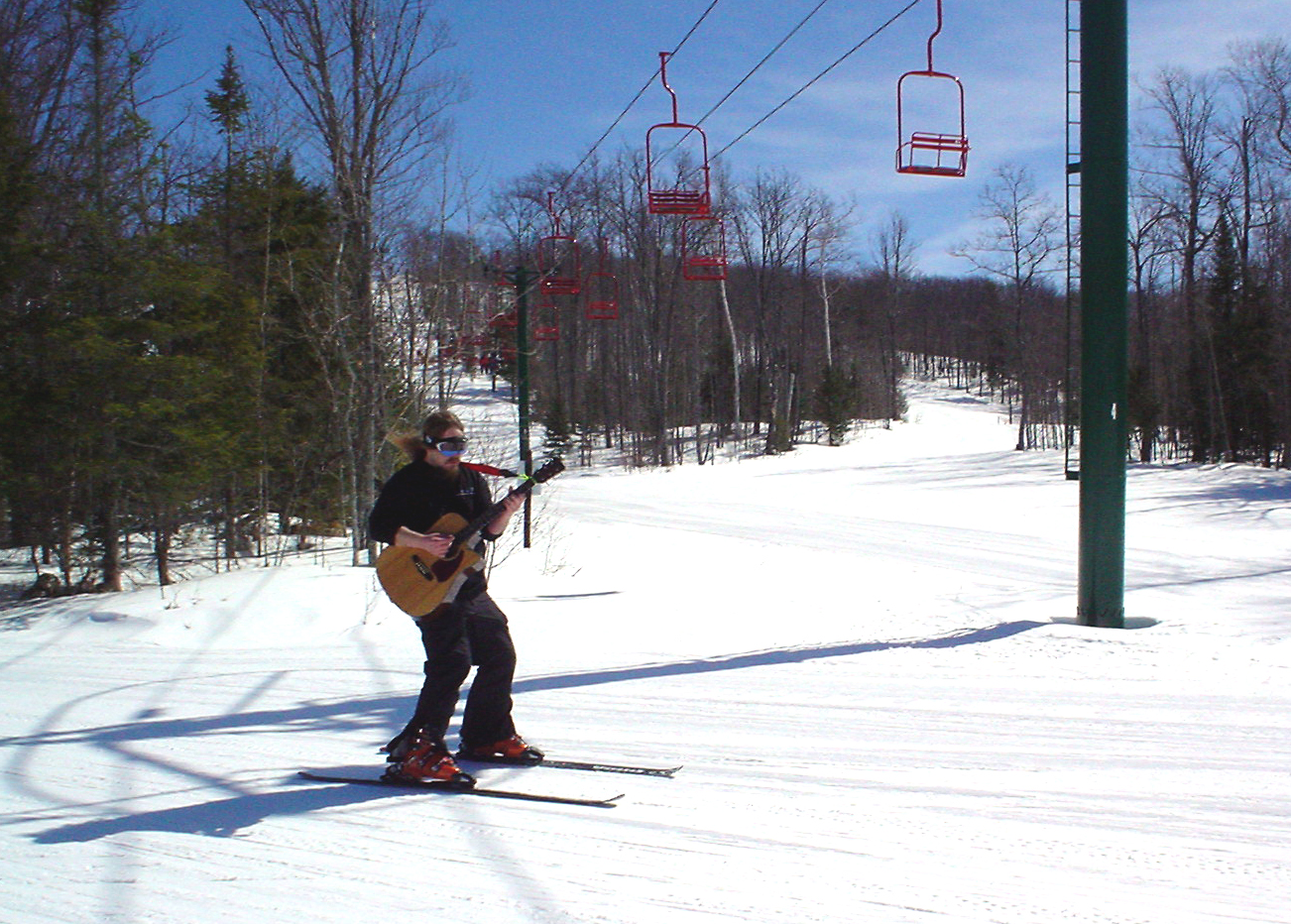
Guitar Playin' on the Slopes

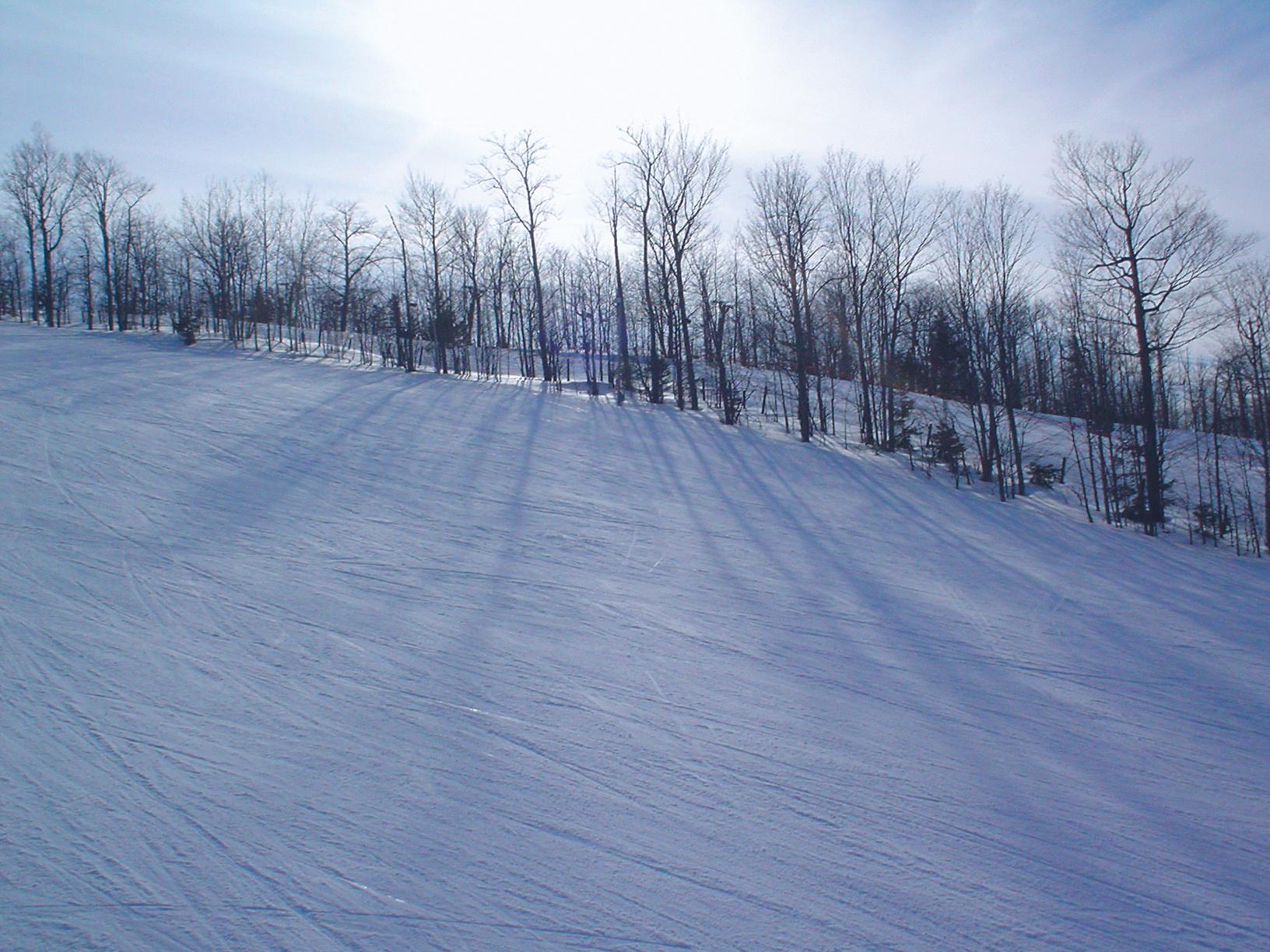
Cool shot of trees and run
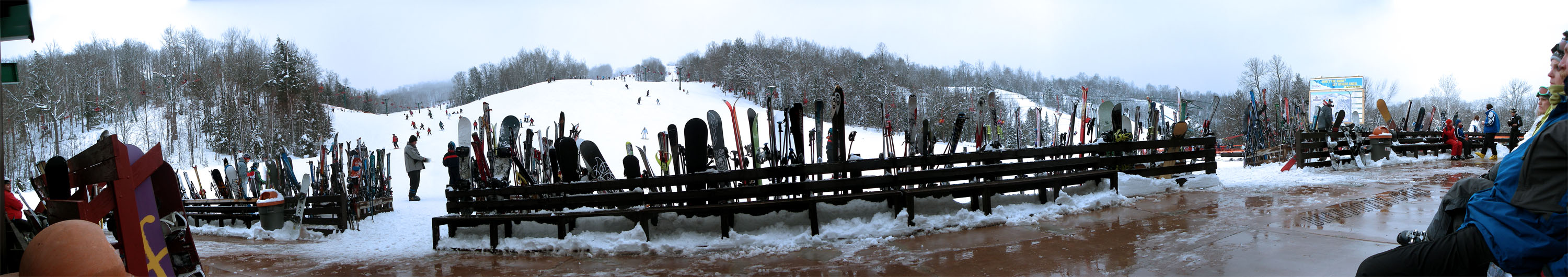
Shot from the Base Place at the base of the headwall.
