= Main Street–Black River Bridge =

- U.S. National Register of Historic Places
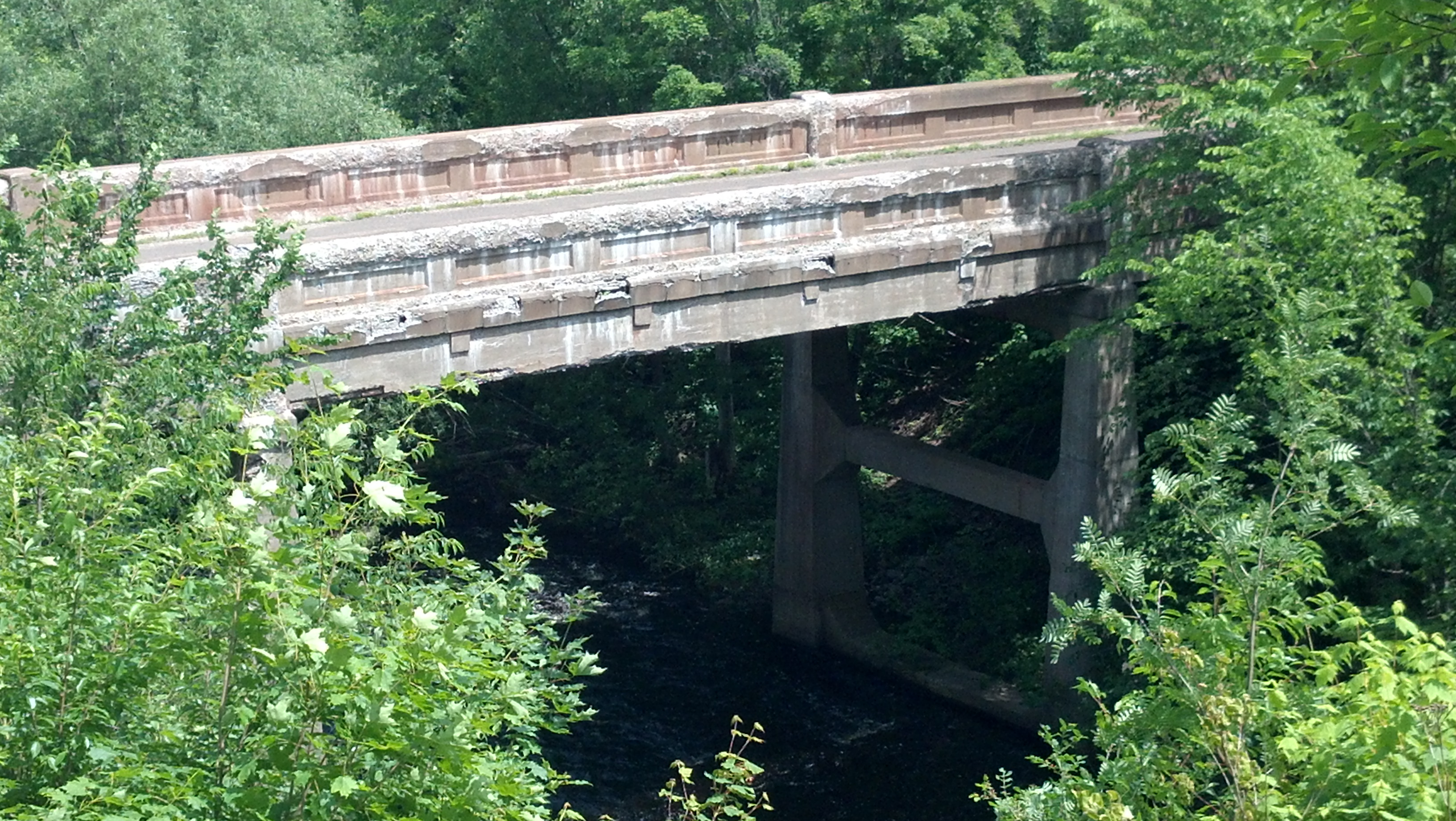
- Bridge in 2013

- Location within Michigan Location within the United States
- Interactive map
- Location: Main St. over Black R., Bessemer Township, Michigan
- Coordinates: 46°28′25″N 90°0′5″W
- Area: less than one acre
- Built: 1923
- Built by: Paul N. Massie
- Architect: Michigan State Highway Dept.
- Architectural style: Through girder bridge
- MPS: Highway Bridges of Michigan MPS
- NRHP reference No.: 99001514
- Added to NRHP: December 9, 1999

The Main Street–Black River Bridge is a bridge located on Main Street over the Black River in Ramsay, Bessemer Township, Michigan, USA. It was listed on the National Register of Historic Places in 1999.

== History ==
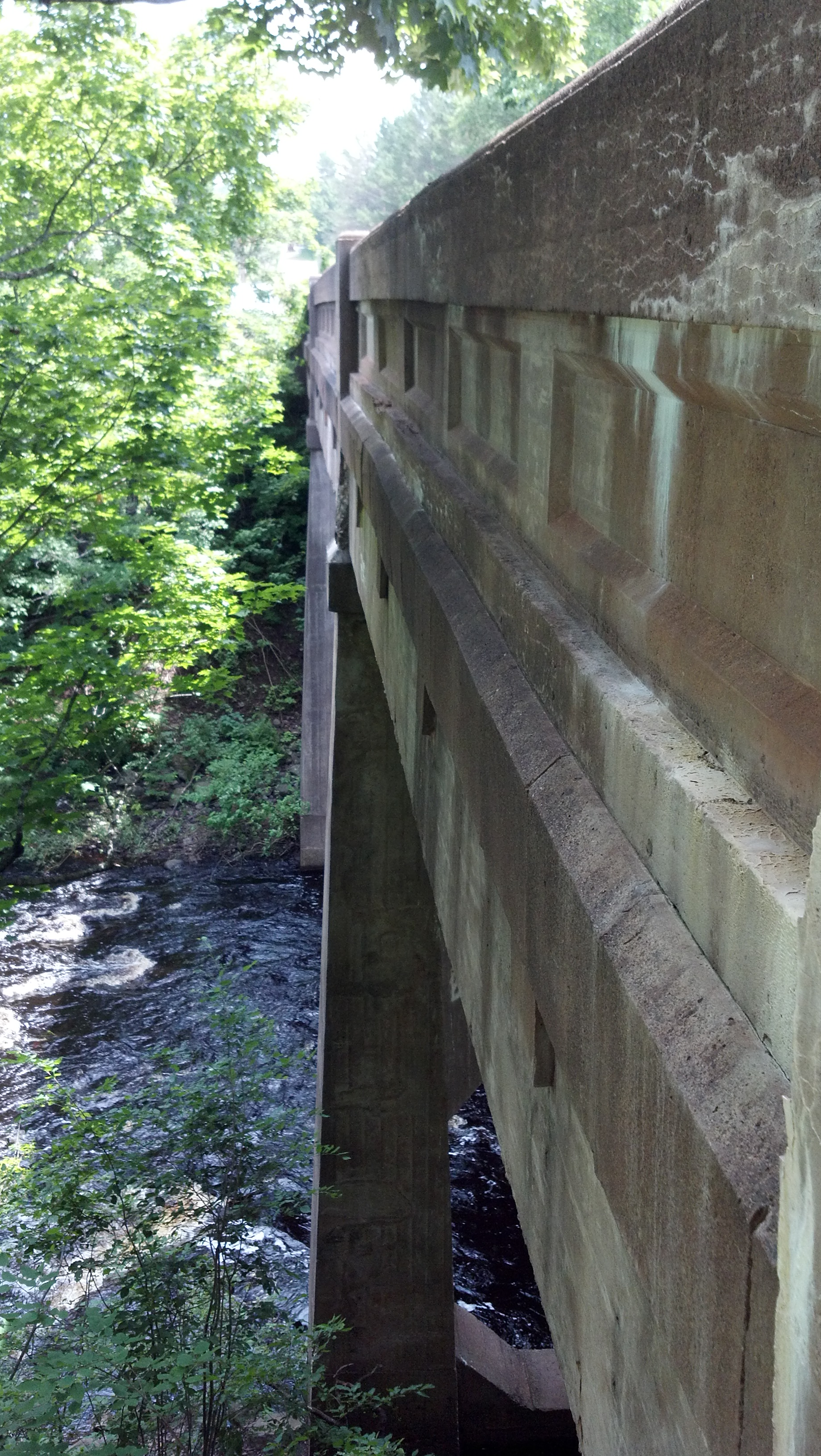
Side

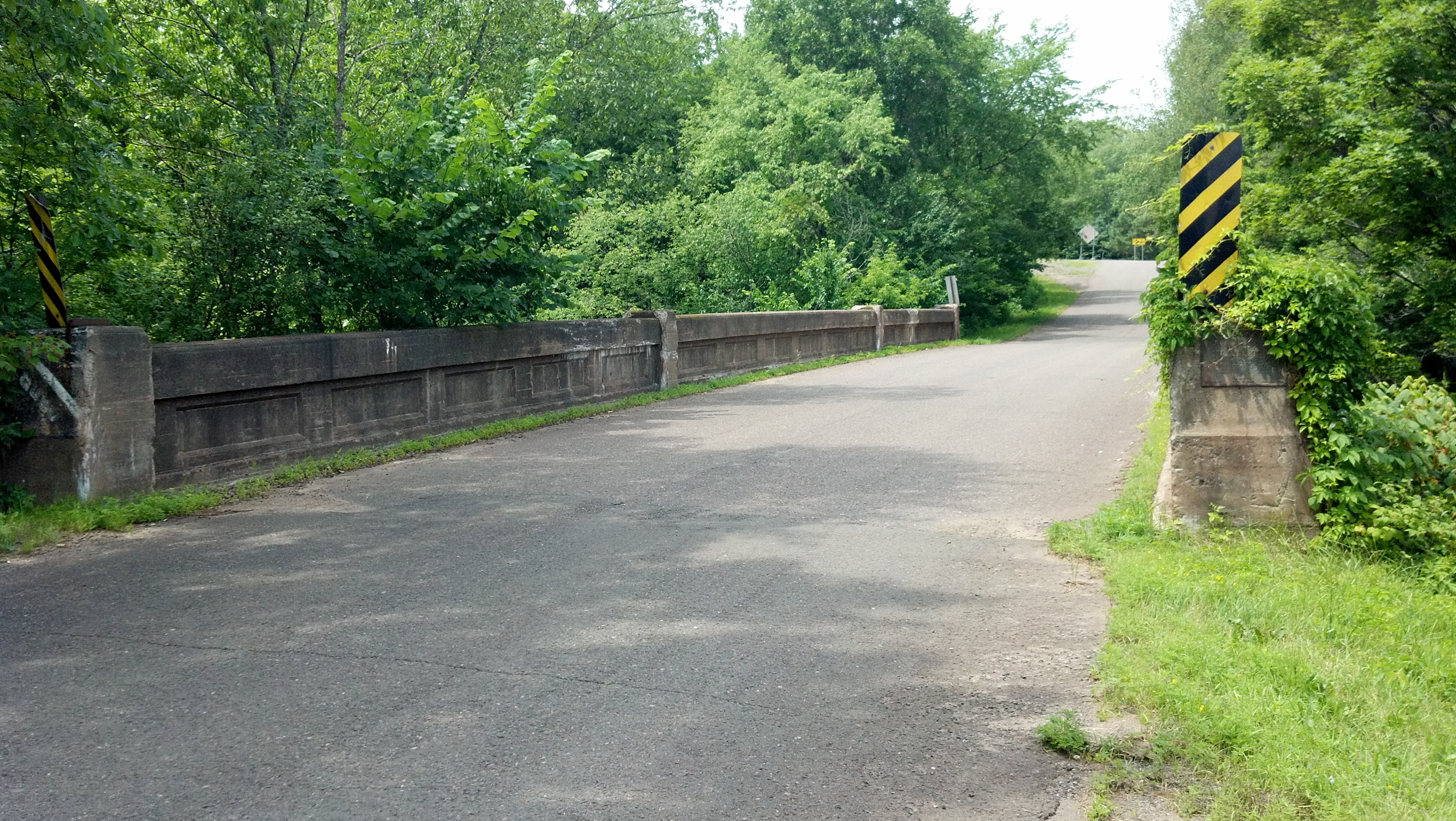
Bridge deck

In 1884, the village of Ramsay (now an unincorporated community) began developing around Hubbard and Weed's sawmill on the Black River. The mill burned in 1889, but by that time Ramsay was home to the company headquarters of and workers from the nearby Castile Mining Company. At the turn of the century, Ramsay's Main Street was carried over the Black River by an older truss bridge; by the end of the 1910s, the bridge was deteriorating and was a bottleneck for vehicular traffic. The Gogebic County Road Commission asked the state to help fund a replacement bridge, and in 1922 engineers from the Michigan State Highway Department designed a bridge to span the Black river, designating it Bridge File No. 270103. A contract for $19,455.14 was awarded to Paul N. Massie of nearby Bessemer, who completed construction in 1923. Since that time, the Main Street–Black River Bridge has been essentially unaltered, and continues to carry vehicles traffic.

== Description ==
The Main Street–Black River Bridge is a concrete through girder bridge, with a main span length of 50 feet (15 m) and a complete structure length of 130 feet (40 m). The structure is 27 feet 2 inches (8.28 m) wide, of which 22 feet (6.7 m) is the roadway. Three concrete girders carry the roadway: a central 50-foot (15 m) girder, and two 40-foot (12 m) girders on each end. The girders sit on tapered concrete piers. Panels are recessed in the girder walls, which are capped with heavy concrete corbels. Bronze plates stating "State Reward Bridge" are mounted on each sidewall.

== Significance ==
By 1923, the concrete through girder bridge design used for the Main Street–Black River Bridge was a well-tested standard design. The Michigan State Highway Department had first delineated this type of structure in 1913–14, and used them for "spans from thirty to fifty feet in both the eighteen and twenty-foot clear roadway from curb to curb," as stated in their Seventh Biennial Report. The Highway Department used this design until about 1930, and in that span designed and built perhaps hundreds of them through the state. Most of this type of bridge were single-span structures; the triple-span design and tapered piers of the Main Street–Black River Bridge mark it as a noteworthy example of the design's potential. The bridge is visually striking when views from the river, and is historically important for enabling local vehicular transportation. Other than minor concrete spalling, the bridge is essentially unaltered and remains in good condition.

== See also ==
- National Register of Historic Places listings in Gogebic County, Michigan
