= WUPM =

Coordinates: 46.472°N 90.012°W

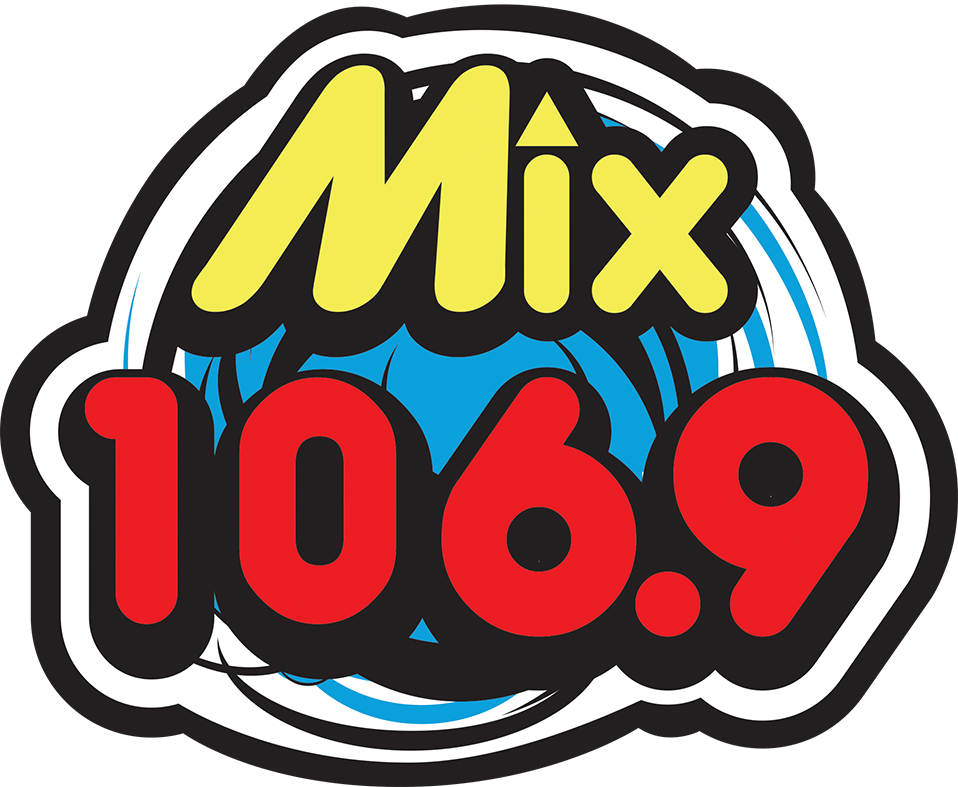
- Ironwood, Michigan; United States
- Broadcast area
- Frequency: 106.9 MHz
- Branding: Mix 106.9

Programming
- Format: Hot adult contemporary
- Affiliations: ABC News Radio; Compass Media Networks; United Stations Radio Networks; Westwood One

Ownership
- Owner: Baroka Broadcasting, Inc.
- Sister stations: WHRY

History
- Call sign meaning: Upper Peninsula Michigan

Technical information
- Licensing authority: FCC
- Facility ID: 5236
- Class: C1
- ERP: 100,000 watts
- HAAT: 151 meters

Links
- Public license information: Public file; LMS
- Webcast: Listen live
- Website: yourmix1069.com

WUPM (106.9 FM) is a radio station licensed to Ironwood, Michigan, United States, broadcasting a hot adult contemporary music format. The station began broadcasting in 1978 as a Top 40 (CHR) format, and has featured a contemporary music format throughout its history.

== History ==
A tragic storm hit the WUPM tower on April 1, 2015, crashing the structure to the ground. The transmitter building was not damaged, and no one was hurt. After the storm, WUPM returned to the airwaves under special authorization from the FCC utilizing a temporary transmitting site at reduced power. During the month of November, 2016, a new 300 foot tower was erected on the Anvil Hill transmitting site bringing WUPM back to its full power. Shortly thereafter, long time morning DJ, Jesse Baroka, took ownership of the station. As of March 28, 2016, WUPM increased its ERP from 53,000 watts to 100,000 watts.

On January 1, 2019, WUPM rebranded as “Mix 106.9”, as it transitioned from Top 40 (CHR) to hot adult contemporary.

== Former logo ==
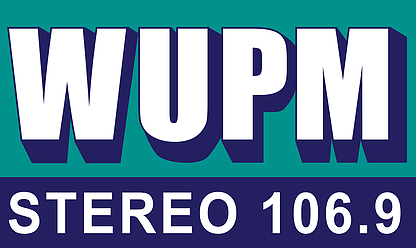
