= WHRY =

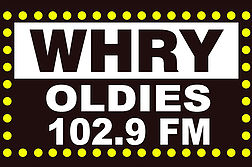
- Hurley, Wisconsin; United States
- Broadcast area: Ironwood, Michigan
- Frequency: 1450 kHz
- Branding: Oldies 102.9

Programming
- Format: Oldies
- Affiliations: ABC Radio

Ownership
- Owner: Baroka Broadcasting, Inc.
- Sister stations: WUPM

History
- First air date: March 1, 1985
- Call sign meaning: Hurley

Technical information
- Licensing authority: FCC
- Facility ID: 5235
- Class: C
- Power: 1,000 watts (unlimited)
- Translator: 102.9 W275CR (Hurley)

Links
- Public license information: Public file; LMS
- Webcast: Listen live
- Website: whry1029.com

WHRY (1450 AM) is acommercial radio station broadcasting an oldies format. Licensed to Hurley, Wisconsin, United States, the station is currently owned by Baroka Broadcasting, Inc., and features programming from ABC Radio. The station is the home of Hurley Northstars Athletics. The AM signal is simulcast on FM translator W275CR at 102.9 MHz in Hurley.

== History ==
The station officially began broadcasting on March 1, 1985. Its call letters were chosen as a phonetic representation of its city of license: W-H-u-R-l-Y. Since its inception, the station has served the Iron County region in Wisconsin and the adjacent Gogebic County in Michigan. WHRY is owned and operated by Baroka Broadcasting, Inc., a family-owned media company led by Jesse Baroka. Jesse Baroka began his career at the station as an employee in high school and fulfilled a long-time dream by acquiring the station and its sister station, WUPM (FM), in 2016. The station currently broadcasts an Oldies format, branded as "Oldies 102.9" (referring to its FM translator frequency). The playlist features hits from the 1960s, 1970s, and 1980s, with programming often featuring content from Cumulus Media.
