= Ironwood Carnegie Library =

- U.S. National Register of Historic Places
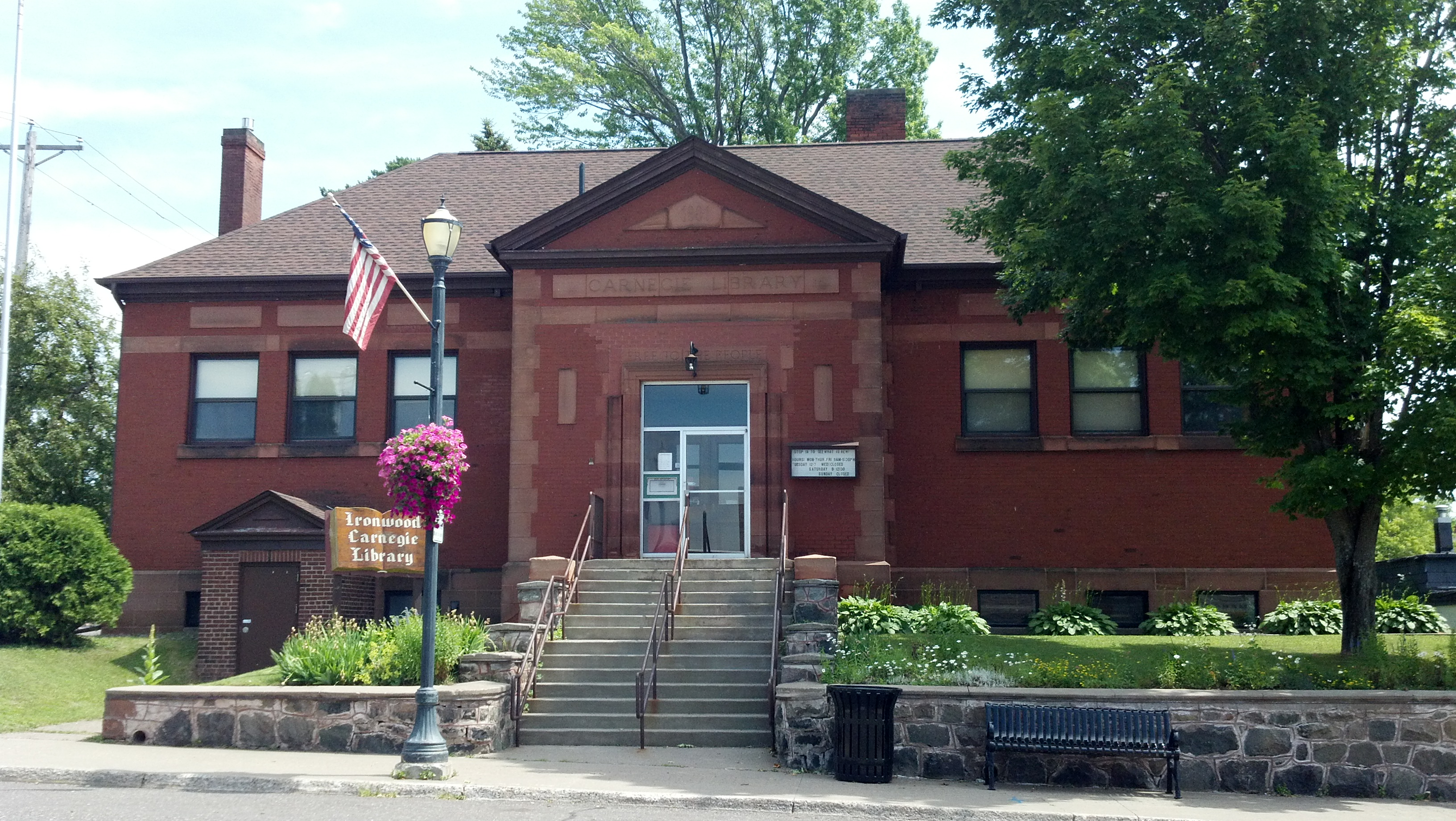

- Location within Michigan Location within the United States
- Interactive map
- Location: 235 E. Aurora St. Ironwood, Michigan
- Coordinates: 46°27′8″N 90°10′20″W
- Area: less than one acre
- Built: 1901
- Built by: Donald and Egan
- NRHP reference No.: 11000948
- Added to NRHP: December 22, 2011

The Ironwood Carnegie Library is a library located at 235 E. Aurora Street in Ironwood, Michigan. It is the oldest continuously operated Carnegie Library in Michigan and was listed on the National Register of Historic Places in 2011.

== History ==
The public library in Ironwood was founded in 1892, and was located in the Ironwood City Hall. In 1900, Andrew Carnegie pledged $12,000 to the city of Ironwood to build a new library, subject to his usual conditions that the town provide a building site and pledge to maintain the building. Carnegie increased his gift by $5000 in 1901. The building was constructed in 1901 by Archie Donald and Daniel Egan of Ashland, Wisconsin for $17,000. It was the first Carnegie Library built in Michigan. The library was moved into the new building in 1901 and the new library was dedicated in January 1902.

Only minor modifications have been made to the building, which still contains the original chairs, tables, and circulation desk.

== Description ==
The Ironwood Carnegie Library is a small building constructed of brownstone and brick.
