= Ironwood City Hall =

- U.S. National Register of Historic Places
- Michigan State Historic Site
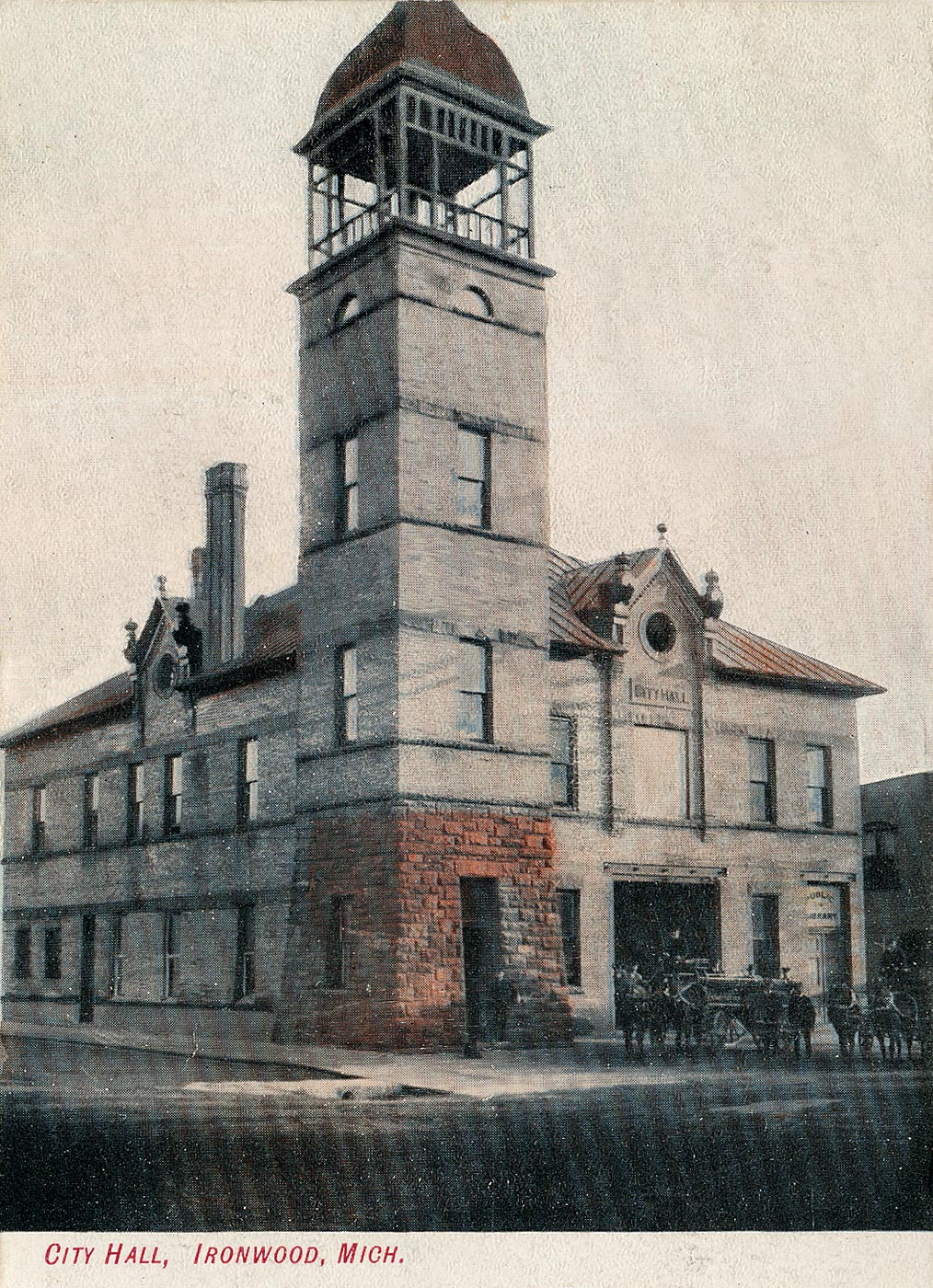

- Location within Michigan Location within the United States
- Interactive map
- Location: McLeod Ave. and Norfolk St., Ironwood, Michigan
- Coordinates: 46°27′16″N 90°9′58″W
- Area: less than one acre
- Built: 1890
- Architect: George Mennie
- Architectural style: Romanesque, Vernacular Richardsonian
- Demolished: 1989
- NRHP reference No.: 80001856

Significant dates
- Added to NRHP: November 28, 1980
- Designated MSHS: May 14, 1975

The Ironwood City Hall was a government building located at the corner of McLeod Avenue and Norfolk Street in Ironwood, Michigan. It was listed on the National Register of Historic Places in 1980, designated a Michigan State Historic Site in 1975, and demolished in 1989.

== History ==
The city of Ironwood was first settled in 1885 as the commercial center of the newly opening Gogebic iron range. The city was incorporated in 1889, and hired architect George Mennie to design a new city hall. This building was constructed the following year. It initially housed the city jail, police department, fire station, library, and city offices. The library was moved in 1901 and the city offices in 1923; since then the police and fire departments exclusively used the building. In 1918, a horse barn and a metal stairway were added to the side facade. The building was designated a Michigan State Historic Site in 1975 and listed on the National Register of Historic Places in 1980, but was demolished in 1989. The site now houses the Gogebic County Transit.

== Description ==
The Ironwood City Hall was a two-story, rectangular, vernacular Richardsonian structure with an exterior of tan brick with smooth brownstone belt cornices on a foundation of rough cut brown sandstone. The hip roof was covered in steel, and an eighty-foot-high tower, originally capped with a pagoda-roofed open turret, was located on one corner. There were several ground-floor entrances, including a tower entrance, a double door for fire equipment, and entrances to the police station and library. The windows were rectangular and symmetrically arranged, with decorative windows in wall dormers on the upper story. Decorative trim, including gable pilasters and finials, chimney caps and cornices, appeared bulbous and weighty.
