= Ironwood station =

- Chicago and Northwestern Railroad Depot
- U.S. National Register of Historic Places
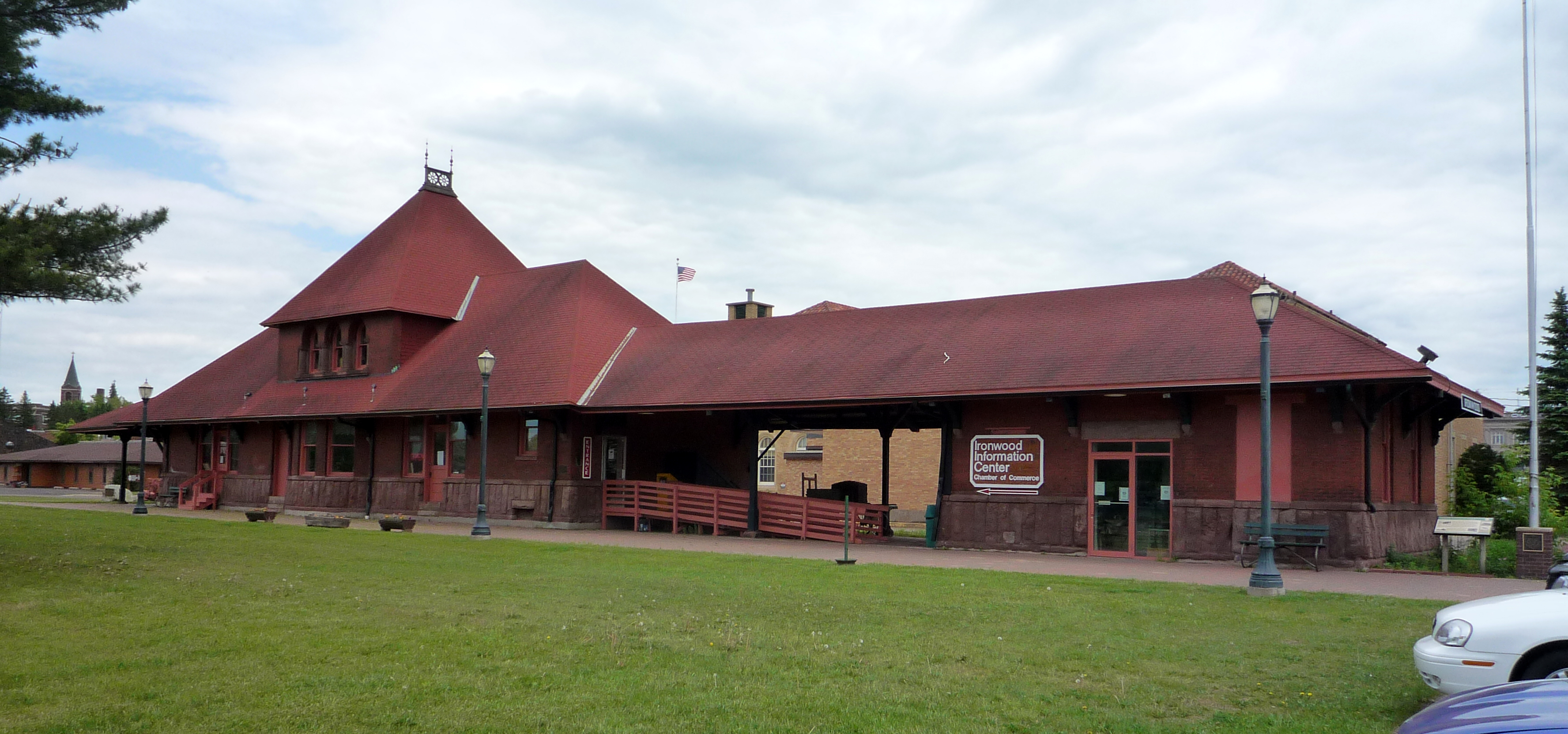

- Location within Michigan Location within the United States
- Interactive map
- Location: Between Suffolk and Lowell Sts., Ironwood, Michigan
- Coordinates: 46°27′21″N 90°10′12″W
- Area: 1 acre (0.40 ha)
- Built: 1892
- Architect: Charles W. Grindle
- Architectural style: Romanesque Revival
- NRHP reference No.: 85000095
- Added to NRHP: January 14, 1985

The Chicago and Northwestern Railroad Depot is a railroad station located between Suffolk and Lowell Streets in Ironwood, Michigan. It was listed on the National Register of Historic Places in 1985.

== History ==
The Milwaukee, Lake Shore and Western Railroad line was laid through what is now Ironwood in 1884. At the time there were almost no people in the settlement, but the railroad and the surrounding virgin timber made the city a boomtown, which swelled to 11,000 people by 1892. The railroad had originally constructed a wood-frame building for use as a depot in Ironwood, but it quickly proved inadequate. In 1892, the company built this brick replacement at a cost of $18,000. The Milwaukee, Lake Shore and Western became part of the Chicago and North Western Railway soon after. The station was used for passenger traffic until 1970, and freight until 1981. In 1983, the former depot was purchased by the Downtown Ironwood Development Authority. It currently houses the Ironwood Area Historical Society.

== Description ==
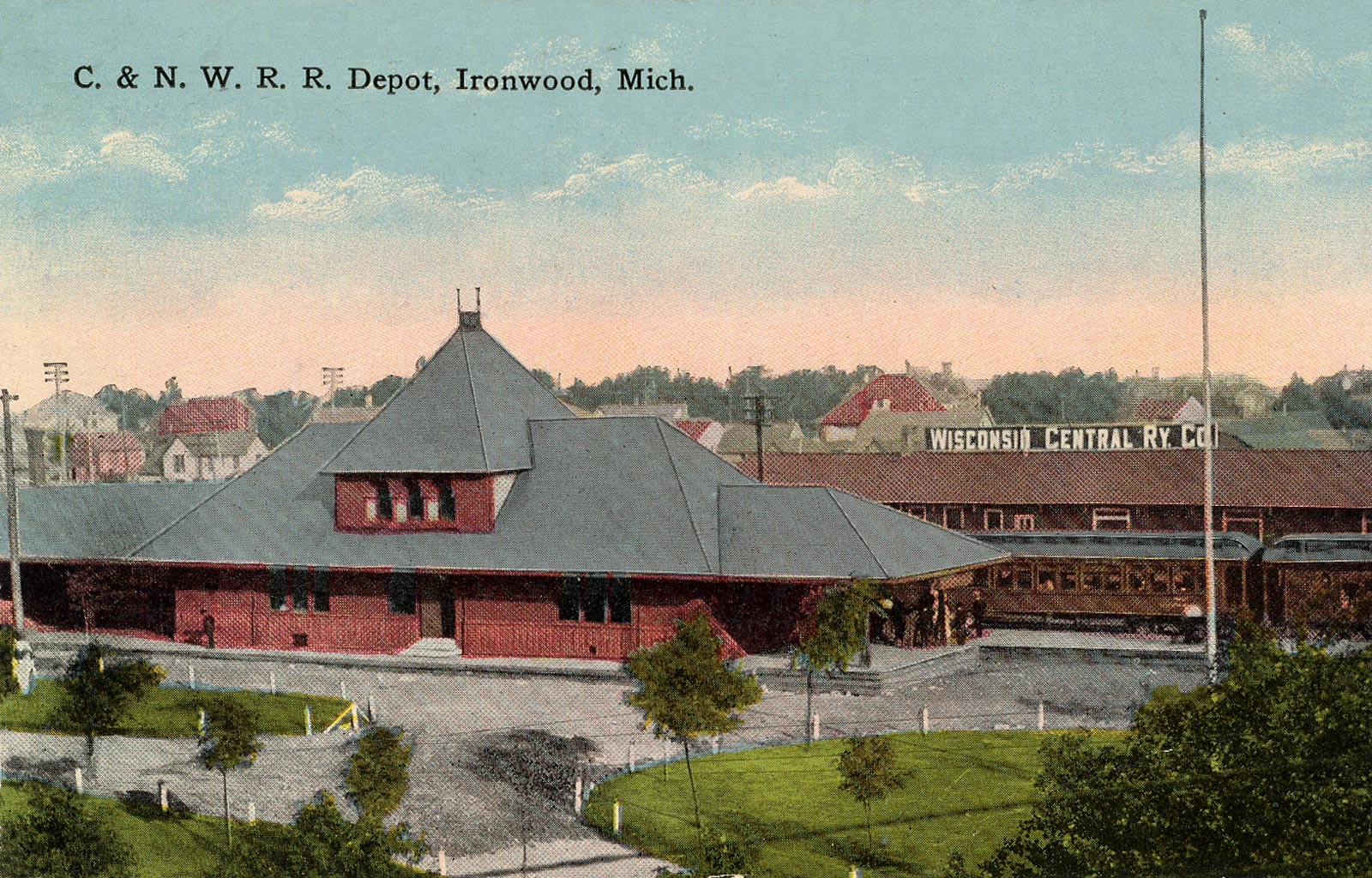
Chicago and Northwestern Railroad Depot, c. 1910

The Chicago and Northwestern Railroad Depot in Ironwood is a red brick and sandstone structure with a one-block long platform. It has a multi-level hipped roof covered with slate. The depot consists of a single-story main depot with a small second story space in the center and a separate, single-story baggage unit with a small modern addition. The two portions are joined with a single roof and measure approximately 175 feet by 28 feet.

The two buildings have vertically laid brown sandstone slabs on the bottom of the walls, rising to a height of about 5-1/2 feet. The walls are brick above. The depot's lower story has simple rectangular doorways and windows with one-over-one double hung windows. A triple-window bay which once housed ticket windows projects from the center of the trackside facade. The small second floor has three round-head window with sandstone sills, deeply recessed between sandstone columns with foliated capitals. The projecting eaves of the main hipped roof are supported by large curved wooden brackets.

The interior of the main depot contains a train dispatcher's quarters and locker room on one side, a ticket office in the center, and a passenger waiting room and rest rooms on the other side. The walls are plastered and painted white, and the floors are wooden. Many of the interior details are original, including the wainscoting, window trim, baseboards, and ceiling molding. The second story originally housed a railroad agent's office and small store room. The baggage structure has three rooms, one of which is the small addition.

Preceding station	Chicago and North Western Railway	Following station
Hurley toward Ashland	Ashland – Green Bay	Van Buskirk toward Green Bay
Terminus	Ironwood – Watersmeet	Siemens toward Watersmeet
