= Ironwood Memorial/Municipal Building =

- Memorial Building
- U.S. National Register of Historic Places
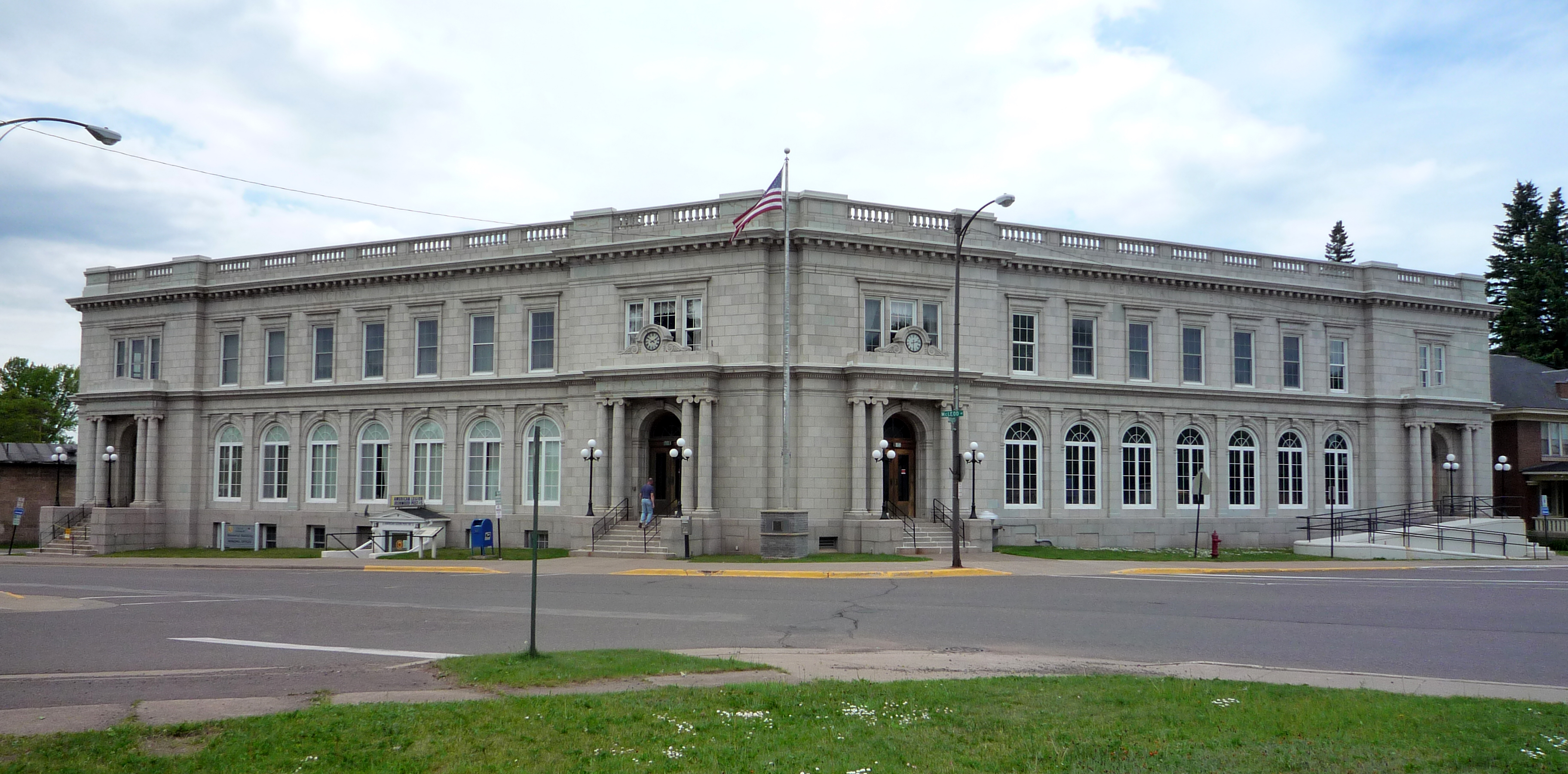

- Location within Michigan Location within the United States
- Interactive map
- Location: McLeod Ave. and Marquette St., Ironwood, Michigan
- Coordinates: 46°27′20″N 90°9′57″W
- Area: 0.5 acres (0.20 ha)
- Built: 1923
- Built by: Albinson Co.
- Architect: Bell & Kinports
- Architectural style: Neoclassical
- NRHP reference No.: 80001857
- Added to NRHP: November 10, 1980

The Ironwood Memorial Building, also known as the Ironwood Municipal Building or the Ironwood Memorial/Municipal Building, is a government building located at the corner of McLeod Avenue and Marquette Street in Ironwood, Michigan. It was listed on the National Register of Historic Places in 1980.

== History ==
The city of Ironwood had plans to build a new municipal building since at least 1917. The building was intended to be a Memorial Building, housing municipal offices and serving as a memorial to veterans. In 1919, the city authorized the issuance of $400,000 in bonds to procure land for and construct the building. Ironwood's American Legion Post and the Ironwood Women's Club helped sell the bonds and raise a total of more than $500,000 to fund the building. It was designed by the Minneapolis firm of Bell & Kinports. The cornerstone of the building was laid in November 1922 in a ceremony honoring veterans of World War I. The building was completed in August 1923 It was used for municipal business, as well as social and recreational uses, such as banquets, plays, basketball games, and education.

The Ironwood Memorial Building was remodeled in 1996. The building continues to serve as Ironwood's City Hall.

== Description ==
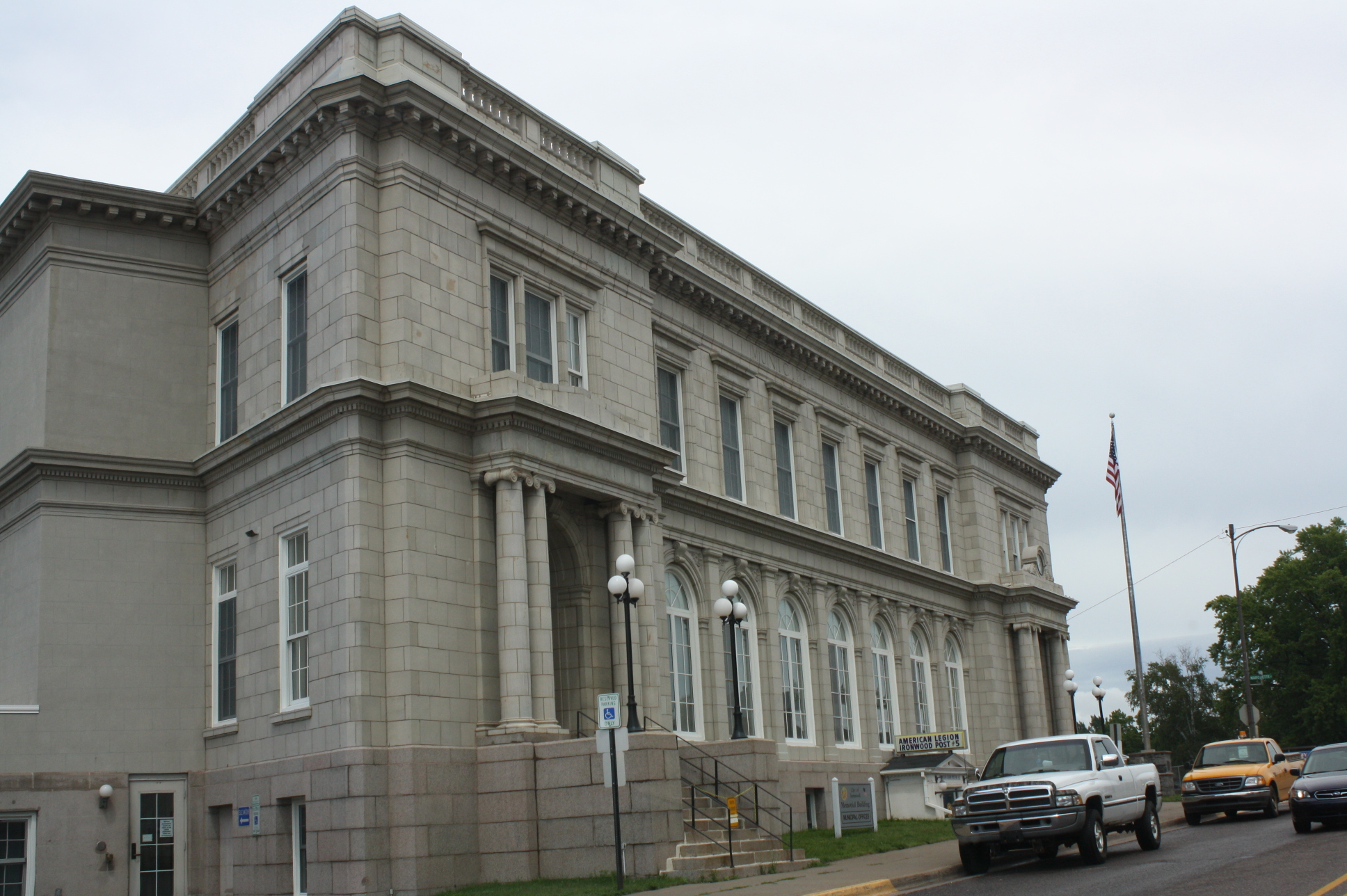
Side view

The Memorial Building is a two-story Neoclassical structure built of concrete in a pentagonal shape. The first floor is raised, providing light to the basement level. The two front facades are faced in grey terra cotta and coursed stone, while the remaining elevations are faced with brick. The heavy bronze door entrances are approached with wide granite steps and are flanked by Ionic columns. Above each entrance, clocks are inset into the terra cotta. A balustrade runs around the roof edge. Multipaned windows separated by pilasters and topped with arches run around the first floor, and rectangular windows with architrave trim are used on the second.

Inside the building are municipal offices (including a court room and council chambers), community facilities, a 1,500-seat auditorium, a pool and gymnasium. The building houses 47 stained glass windows (including a number depicting the Battle of Argonne), a statue of World War I doughboy, and bronze tablets listing area men who served during the Civil War, Spanish–American War, and World War I. A mural by artist Carl Frezell depicting local iron mines was funded by the Works Progress Administration. The Ironwood Women's Club has a private clubroom in the building.
