= Wakefield Township, Michigan =

- Civil township
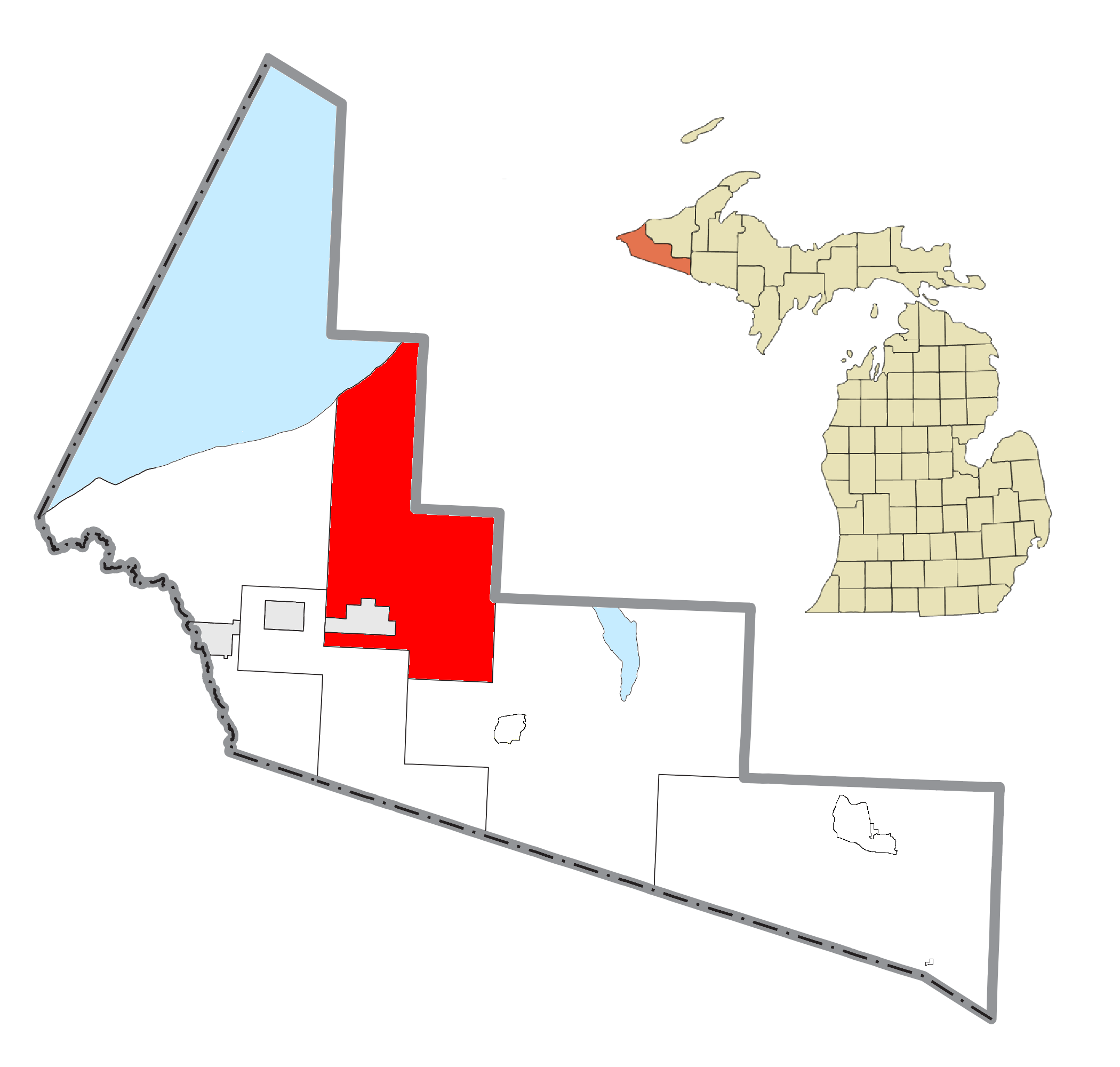
- Location within Gogebic County

- Location within the state of Michigan Wakefield Township (the United States)
- Coordinates: 46°31′53″N 89°52′11″W
- Country: United States
- State: Michigan
- County: Gogebic

Government
  - Supervisor: John Cox
  - Clerk: Mandy Lake

Area
  - Total: 180.8 sq mi (468.2 km^{2})
  - Land: 179.8 sq mi (465.6 km^{2})
  - Water: 0.97 sq mi (2.5 km^{2})
- Elevation: 1,421 ft (433 m)

Population (2020)
  - Total: 301
  - Density: 2.1/sq mi (0.8/km^{2})
- Time zone: UTC-6 (Central (CST))
  - Summer (DST): UTC-5 (CDT)
- ZIP code(s): 49938 (Ironwood); 49947 (Marenisco); 49968 (Wafefield)
- Area code: 906
- FIPS code: 26-82800
- GNIS feature ID: 1627205
- Website: Official website

Wakefield Township is a civil township of Gogebic County in the U.S. state of Michigan. The population was 301 in 2020.

== Geography ==
According to the United States Census Bureau, the township has a total area of 180.8 square miles (468 km^{2}), of which 179.8 square miles (466 km^{2}) is land and 1.0 square mile (2.6 km^{2}) (0.54%) is water.

== Communities ==
- The City of Wakefield is situated within the township, but is administratively autonomous.
- Duke was a lumbertown in this township with a station on the Duluth, South Shore and Atlantic Railroad. It had a post office from 1901 until 1906.
- Thomaston is an unincorporated community in the township a few miles north of Wakefield at 46°30′59″N 89°55′39″W. A post office opened November 7, 1891 and was discontinued July 31, 1923. The office reopened and operated from January 12, 1925, until August 14, 1926.
- Connorville is an unincorporated community in the township a few miles north of Thomaston at 46°33′07″N 89°55′52″W. It began as a lumber camp in 1925.
- Tula was a lumbertown approximately 8 miles east of the City of Wakefield on M-28 at 46°32′46″N 89°48′53″W. It had a post office from 1906 until 1916. There is a sign approximately 1 1/2 miles east of the former town site that reads "Tula".

== Demographics ==
As of the census of 2000, there were 364 people, 161 households, and 110 families residing in the township. In 2020, there were 301 people residing in the township.
