= Ironwood, Michigan =

Ironwood, Michigan Maananoonsing (Ojibwe)
- City
- City of Ironwood
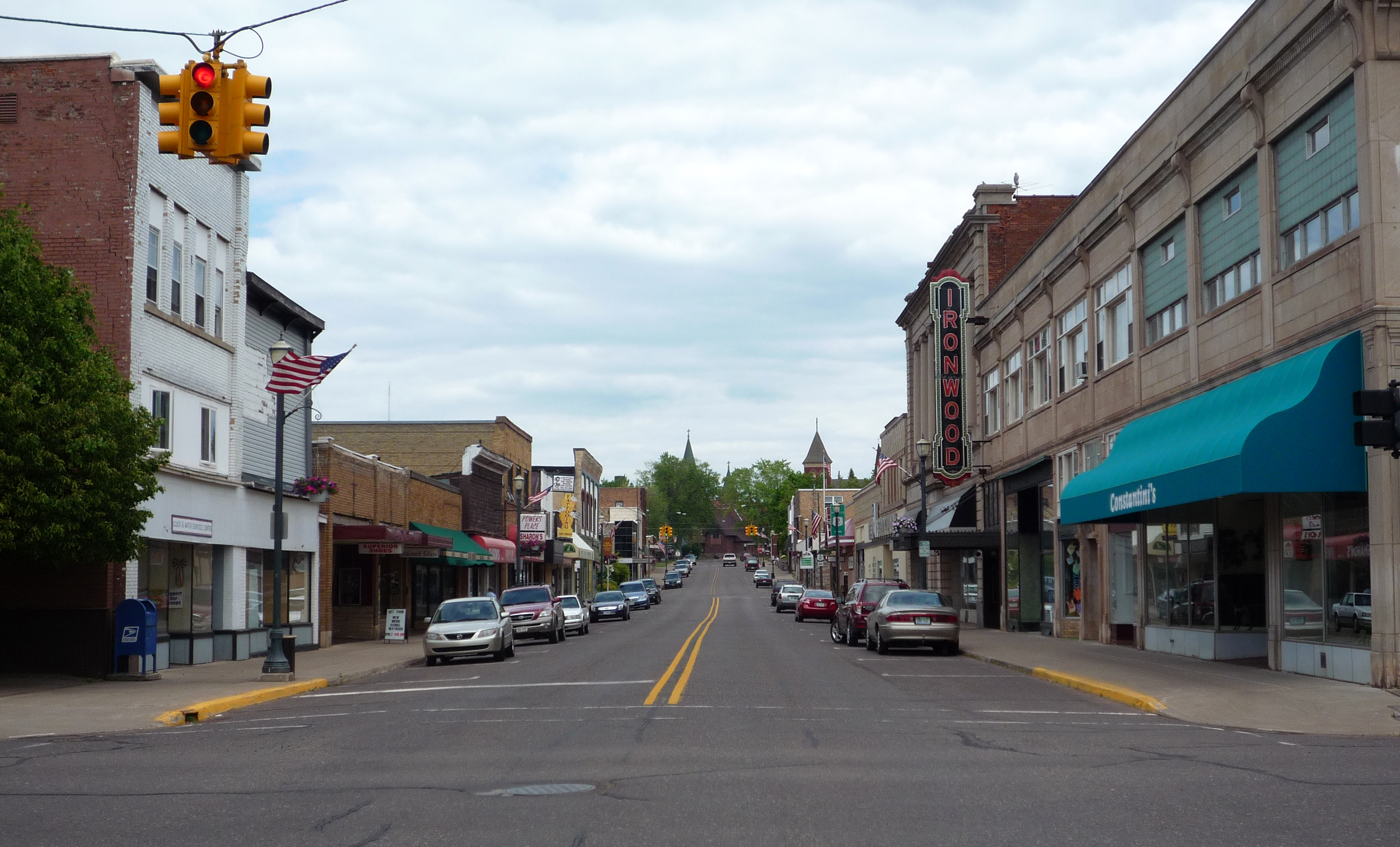
- Downtown along Aurora Street (Bus. US 2)

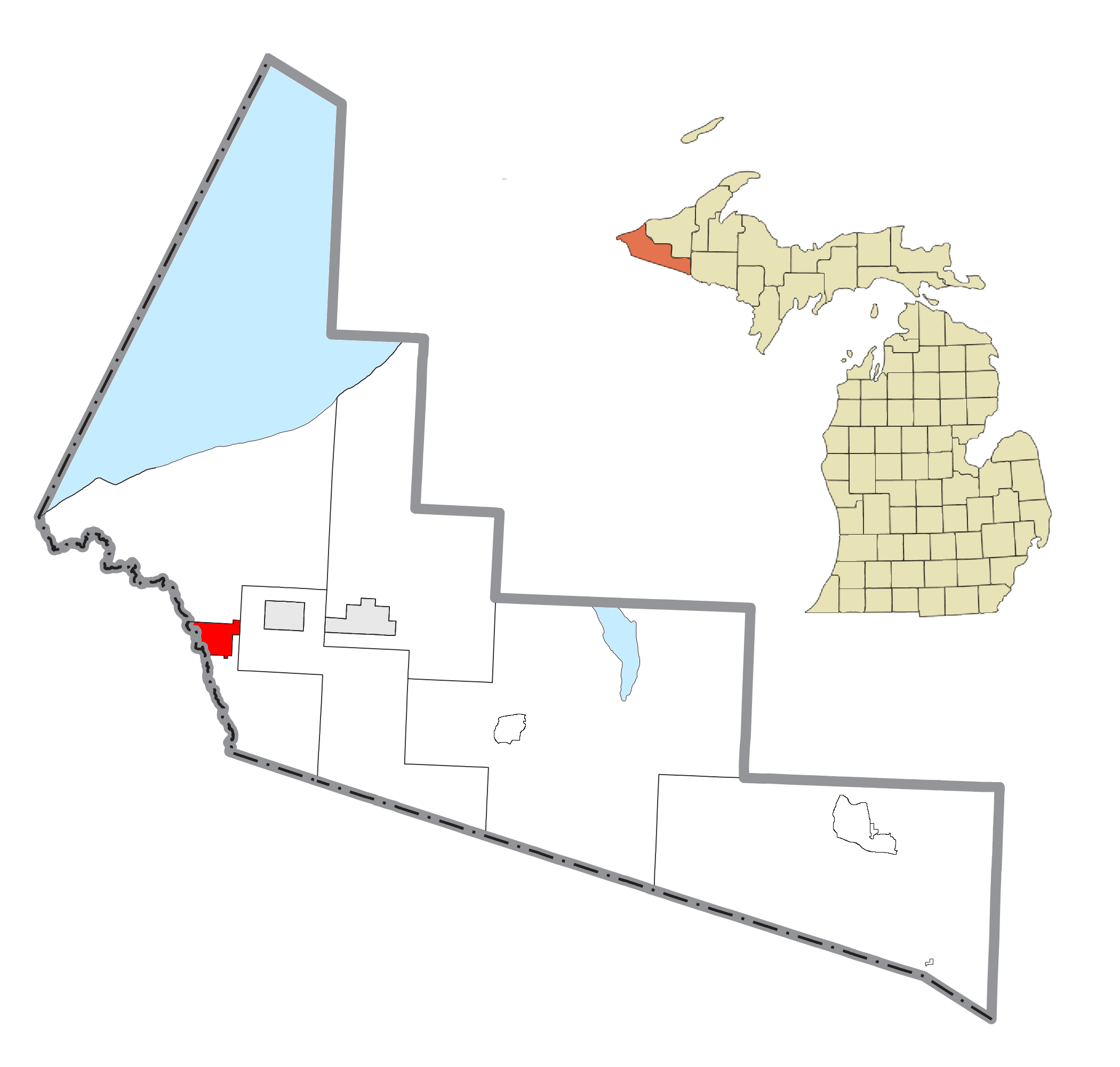
- Location within Gogebic County

- Location within the state of Michigan
- Coordinates: 46°27′21″N 90°9′34″W
- Country: United States
- State: Michigan
- County: Gogebic
- Settled: 1885
- Incorporated: 1887 (village); 1889 (city)

Government
  - Type: City commission
  - Mayor: Kim Corcoran
  - Mayor pro tem: David Andresen

Area
  - Total: 6.58 sq mi (17.04 km^{2})
  - Land: 6.58 sq mi (17.04 km^{2})
  - Water: 0 sq mi (0.00 km^{2})
- Elevation: 1,506 ft (459 m)

Population (2020)
  - Total: 5,045
  - Density: 767.0/sq mi (296.13/km^{2})
- Time zone: UTC−6 (Central (CST))
  - Summer (DST): UTC−5 (CDT)
- ZIP code(s): 49938
- Area code: 906
- FIPS code: 26-41060
- GNIS feature ID: 0629087
- Website: Official website

Ironwood (Ojibwe: Maananoonsing) is a city in Gogebic County in the Upper Peninsula of the U.S. state of Michigan, about 18 miles (29 km) south of Lake Superior. The city is on US Highway 2 across the Montreal River from Hurley, Wisconsin. It is the westernmost city in Michigan, situated on the same line of longitude (90.2 degrees West) as Clinton, Iowa, and St. Louis, Missouri. The population was 5,045 at the 2020 census, down from 5,387 at the 2010 census. The city is bordered by Ironwood Township to the north, but the two are administered autonomously.

While originally an iron mining town, the area is now known for its downhill skiing resorts, including Big Powderhorn, Snowriver, Mount Zion and Whitecap as well as its cross country skiing at the Wolverine Nordic Trail System and the ABR Nordic Center.

Ironwood is home of the "World's Tallest Indian", a 52 ft (15.8 m) fiberglass statue of tribal leader Hiawatha.

== History ==
Ironwood was settled in the spring of 1885. The town was incorporated as a village in 1887 and as a city on April 8, 1889. The township area north of the city was incorporated as Ironwood Township on April 8, 1889. In 1890 the population of Ironwood passed 7,500 and in 1900 it reached 10,000. Ironwood reputedly acquired its name when Frederic W. Rhinelander, president of the Milwaukee Lake Shore and Western Railroad line, arriving by train at what was then little more than a wilderness camp, chose it to honor one of his employees, mining captain James (Iron) Wood. "Ironwood" is also a colloquial name for Ostrya virginiana, a common hardwood tree in the Upper Midwest.

Ironwood is located within the now inactive Gogebic Iron Range. Iron ore was found in the area in the 1870s. The arrival of the railroad in the mid-1880s gave an impetus to more extensive development of the area's ore deposits. Several mines, such as the Norrie, Aurora, Ashland, Newport, and Pabst, were opened in Ironwood. The mines and the lumber works attracted newcomers from other parts of the US and from European countries such as England, Finland, Germany, Italy, Poland, and Sweden.

On September 17, 1887, a disastrous fire swept over half the business area, although the buildings that were lost were quickly rebuilt. In 1926, the Pabst Mine Disaster occurred, killing three electricians and trapping forty-three miners for up to five days.

By the early 1890s, twelve churches had been established in Ironwood by the various immigrant communities:

- The Methodist Episcopal Church
- The Jessieville Methodist Episcopal Church
- St Ambrose Church (Catholic)
- St Michael's Church (Catholic)
- First Swedish Baptist Church
- Swedish Methodist Episcopal Church
- Swedish Mission Church (Covenant Church)
- Swedish Lutheran Church
- First Finnish Lutheran Church
- The First Presbyterian Church
- St Paul's Episcopal Church
- The First Apostolic Lutheran Church

In the early 1960s, the U.S. Air Force established a Strategic Air Command (SAC) Radar Bomb Scoring site atop Norrie hill to track and score high altitude and treetop level simulated bomb runs by B-52s and B-47s on targets in the Ironwood area. A monument is erected south of Hurley, Wisconsin to remember those crew members killed in two B-47 low level runs. The site was moved to Charlevoix, Michigan in the mid-1960s.

== Geography and climate ==
According to the United States Census Bureau, the city has a total area of 6.42 square miles (16.63 km^{2}), all of it land. Ironwood is one of the snowiest places in Michigan, and has an average seasonal snowfall of 188.2 inches (4.78 m). The deepest snow cover, 71 inches (1.80 m), was measured on February 23, 1904.

Climate data for Ironwood, Michigan (1991–2020 normals, extremes 1901–present)
Month	Jan	Feb	Mar	Apr	May	Jun	Jul	Aug	Sep	Oct	Nov	Dec	Year
Record high °F (°C)	55 (13)	62 (17)	79 (26)	88 (31)	100 (38)	99 (37)	104 (40)	101 (38)	99 (37)	86 (30)	80 (27)	59 (15)	104 (40)
Mean maximum °F (°C)	39.7 (4.3)	45.9 (7.7)	58.3 (14.6)	72.2 (22.3)	83.0 (28.3)	87.5 (30.8)	87.9 (31.1)	87.2 (30.7)	83.1 (28.4)	75.3 (24.1)	57.1 (13.9)	43.6 (6.4)	90.3 (32.4)
Mean daily maximum °F (°C)	20.1 (−6.6)	24.5 (−4.2)	35.7 (2.1)	48.4 (9.1)	62.8 (17.1)	72.3 (22.4)	76.3 (24.6)	74.6 (23.7)	66.7 (19.3)	52.6 (11.4)	37.2 (2.9)	25.4 (−3.7)	49.7 (9.8)
Daily mean °F (°C)	12.0 (−11.1)	14.5 (−9.7)	25.1 (−3.8)	38.0 (3.3)	51.9 (11.1)	61.8 (16.6)	66.1 (18.9)	64.2 (17.9)	56.5 (13.6)	43.7 (6.5)	30.1 (−1.1)	18.3 (−7.6)	40.2 (4.6)
Mean daily minimum °F (°C)	3.9 (−15.6)	4.5 (−15.3)	14.4 (−9.8)	27.7 (−2.4)	41.0 (5.0)	51.2 (10.7)	55.9 (13.3)	53.9 (12.2)	46.2 (7.9)	34.9 (1.6)	23.0 (−5.0)	11.2 (−11.6)	30.6 (−0.8)
Mean minimum °F (°C)	−19.0 (−28.3)	−18.6 (−28.1)	−11.8 (−24.3)	11.0 (−11.7)	26.6 (−3.0)	35.6 (2.0)	44.1 (6.7)	41.8 (5.4)	31.3 (−0.4)	21.5 (−5.8)	3.2 (−16.0)	−12.0 (−24.4)	−23.3 (−30.7)
Record low °F (°C)	−41 (−41)	−41 (−41)	−34 (−37)	−12 (−24)	13 (−11)	25 (−4)	31 (−1)	30 (−1)	21 (−6)	2 (−17)	−18 (−28)	−36 (−38)	−41 (−41)
Average precipitation inches (mm)	1.96 (50)	1.47 (37)	2.03 (52)	3.14 (80)	3.75 (95)	3.91 (99)	4.21 (107)	3.76 (96)	3.84 (98)	4.05 (103)	2.88 (73)	2.37 (60)	37.37 (949)
Average snowfall inches (cm)	43.1 (109)	30.9 (78)	23.9 (61)	11.7 (30)	1.9 (4.8)	0.0 (0.0)	0.0 (0.0)	0.0 (0.0)	0.3 (0.76)	6.0 (15)	24.1 (61)	43.6 (111)	185.5 (471)
Average extreme snow depth inches (cm)	24.2 (61)	25.9 (66)	22.9 (58)	9.9 (25)	1.4 (3.6)	0.0 (0.0)	0.0 (0.0)	0.0 (0.0)	0.2 (0.51)	2.7 (6.9)	10.6 (27)	17.4 (44)	28.6 (73)
Average precipitation days (≥ 0.01 in)	18.1	13.6	12.5	12.8	13.4	13.2	12.9	11.8	13.9	15.6	14.8	16.8	169.4
Average snowy days (≥ 0.1 in)	18.4	13.7	10.6	5.9	0.8	0.0	0.0	0.0	0.1	3.1	11.0	15.9	79.5
Source: NOAA

== Demographics ==
Historical population
Census	Pop.	Note	%±
1890	7,745		—
1900	9,705		25.3%
1910	12,821		32.1%
1920	15,739		22.8%
1930	14,299		−9.1%
1940	13,369		−6.5%
1950	11,466		−14.2%
1960	10,265		−10.5%
1970	8,711		−15.1%
1980	7,741		−11.1%
1990	6,849		−11.5%
2000	6,293		−8.1%
2010	5,387		−14.4%
2020	5,045		−6.3%
U.S. Decennial Census

=== 2020 census ===
As of the 2020 census, Ironwood had a population of 5,045. The median age was 47.5 years. 16.4% of residents were under the age of 18 and 24.8% of residents were 65 years of age or older. For every 100 females there were 100.3 males, and for every 100 females age 18 and over there were 99.5 males age 18 and over.

95.8% of residents lived in urban areas, while 4.2% lived in rural areas.

There were 2,462 households in Ironwood, of which 19.3% had children under the age of 18 living in them. Of all households, 34.2% were married-couple households, 26.8% were households with a male householder and no spouse or partner present, and 29.6% were households with a female householder and no spouse or partner present. About 42.0% of all households were made up of individuals and 17.5% had someone living alone who was 65 years of age or older.

There were 3,063 housing units, of which 19.6% were vacant. The homeowner vacancy rate was 2.8% and the rental vacancy rate was 9.5%.

Racial composition as of the 2020 census
Race	Number	Percent
White	4,632	91.8%
Black or African American	44	0.9%
American Indian and Alaska Native	65	1.3%
Asian	20	0.4%
Native Hawaiian and Other Pacific Islander	0	0.0%
Some other race	30	0.6%
Two or more races	254	5.0%
Hispanic or Latino (of any race)	101	2.0%

=== 2010 census ===
As of the census of 2010, there were 5,387 people, 2,520 households, and 1,408 families residing in the city. The population density was 839.1 inhabitants per square mile (324.0/km^{2}). There were 3,175 housing units at an average density of 494.5 per square mile (190.9/km^{2}). The racial makeup of the city was 96.0% White, 0.5% African American, 1.1% Native American, 0.2% Asian, 0.3% from other races, and 1.8% from two or more races. Hispanic or Latino of any race were 1.2% of the population.

There were 2,520 households, of which 23.8% had children under the age of 18 living with them, 38.5% were married couples living together, 12.3% had a female householder with no husband present, 5.1% had a male householder with no wife present, and 44.1% were non-families. 38.5% of all households were made up of individuals, and 17% had someone living alone who was 65 years of age or older. The average household size was 2.09 and the average family size was 2.72.

The median age in the city was 45.5 years. 19.3% of residents were under the age of 18; 8.6% were between the ages of 18 and 24; 21.7% were from 25 to 44; 28.7% were from 45 to 64; and 21.7% were 65 years of age or older. The gender makeup of the city was 48.1% male and 51.9% female.

=== 2000 census ===
As of the census of 2000, there were 6,293 people, 2,841 households, and 1,625 families residing in the city. The population density was 960.3 inhabitants per square mile (370.8/km^{2}). There were 3,349 housing units at an average density of 511.0 per square mile (197.3/km^{2}). The racial makeup of the city was 97.52% White, 0.10% African American, 0.72% Native American, 0.22% Asian, 0.14% from other races, and 1.30% from two or more races. Hispanic or Latino of any race were 0.83% of the population.

The ancestral makeup of the population were 24.7% Finnish, 17.0% German, 14.8% Italian, 12.6% Polish, 10.4% English and 9.5% Swedish.

There were 2,841 households, out of which 24.9% had children under the age of 18 living with them, 42.4% were married couples living together, 11.2% had a female householder with no husband present, and 42.8% were non-families. 37.9% of all households were made up of individuals, and 20.8% had someone living alone who was 65 years of age or older. The average household size was 2.16 and the average family size was 2.84.

In the city, the population was spread out, with 22.2% under the age of 18, 7.9% from 18 to 24, 23.6% from 25 to 44, 21.8% from 45 to 64, and 24.5% who were 65 years of age or older. The median age was 42 years. For every 100 females, there were 89.1 males. For every 100 females age 18 and over, there were 86.3 males.

The median income for a household in the city was $23,502, and the median income for a family was $30,349. Males had a median income of $26,992 versus $21,184 for females. The per capita income for the city was $14,131. About 17.0% of families and 18.5% of the population were below the poverty line, including 24.2% of those under age 18 and 12.4% of those age 65 or over.

== Culture ==
Ironwood boasts two theatrical venues: Theatre North, dedicated to live community productions; and the Historic Ironwood Theatre, which features local, regional and national acts, and is listed on the National Register of Historic Places. Bethany Ann Hellen Studios produces dance recitals throughout the year and sends dancers to compete at state and national competitions. The Ironwood Carnegie Library is the oldest operating Carnegie library in the state of Michigan. During the summer the Emberlight Festival brings world-class musicians, Broadway stars, art shows, and independent film screenings to Ironwood.

=== Literature ===
Ironwood and its famous pasties appear in Neil Gaiman's novel American Gods. Ironwood and the Ironwood region are central to folk novel Marvin & Me, by author and Ironwood native Rod Stockhaus.

Raymond Luczak's Compassion, Michigan: The Ironwood Stories was inspired by Ironwood's 130-year history.

== Government ==
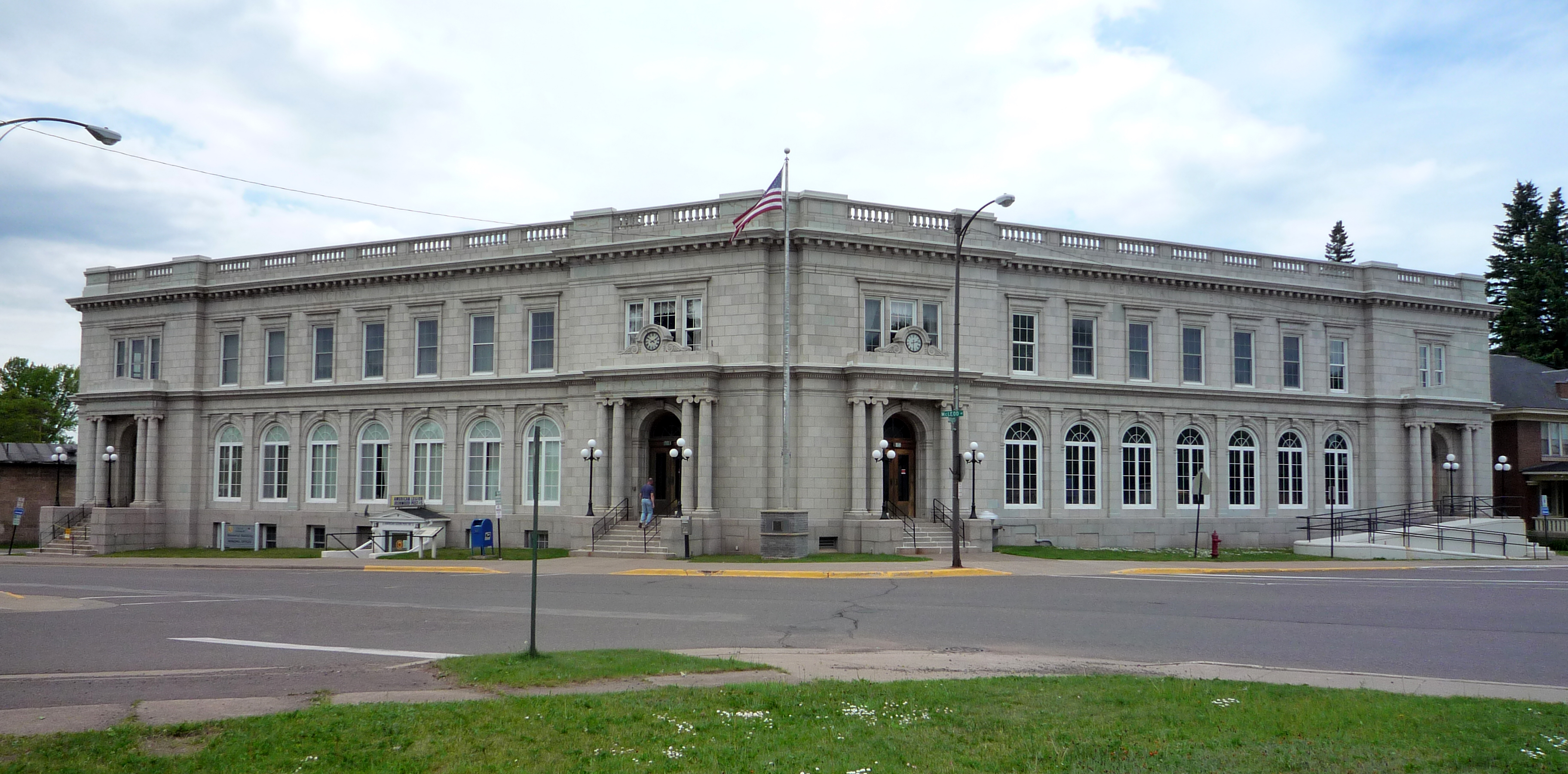
The Memorial Building, listed on the National Register of Historic Places

Ironwood's city government, like many other small Michigan communities, consists of a five-member city council with the recipient of the most votes among the five serving as Mayor. Day-to-day operations are the responsibility of the City Manager, who reports directly to the council during their two monthly, public meetings.

=== Public protection ===
The City of Ironwood operates a public safety department, in which all of the members are fully cross-trained and serve as both police officers and firefighters. Current city ordinances allow for a full-time staff of around twelve. Before 1989, the city had traditional, separate police and fire departments. IPSD, as the department is now known, continues to be the only full-time fire department in the Western Upper Peninsula. The Public Safety Department is also supplemented by the volunteer fire department which has been in operation since 1887. In response to a decade-long rise in tourism, the department now operates a snowmobile patrol unit from December to February, and a community-based foot patrol unit from May to September.

== Education ==
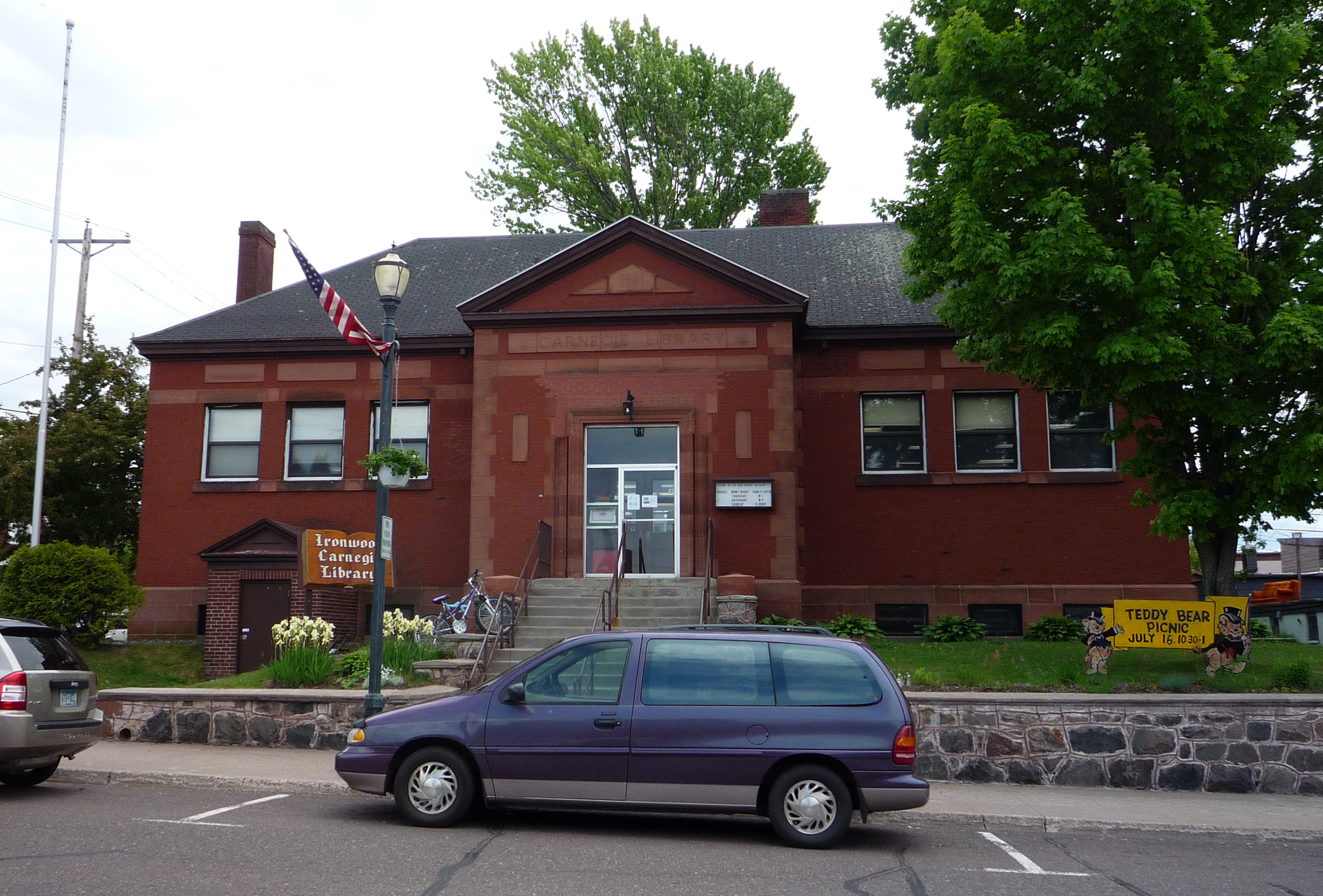
Ironwood Carnegie Library

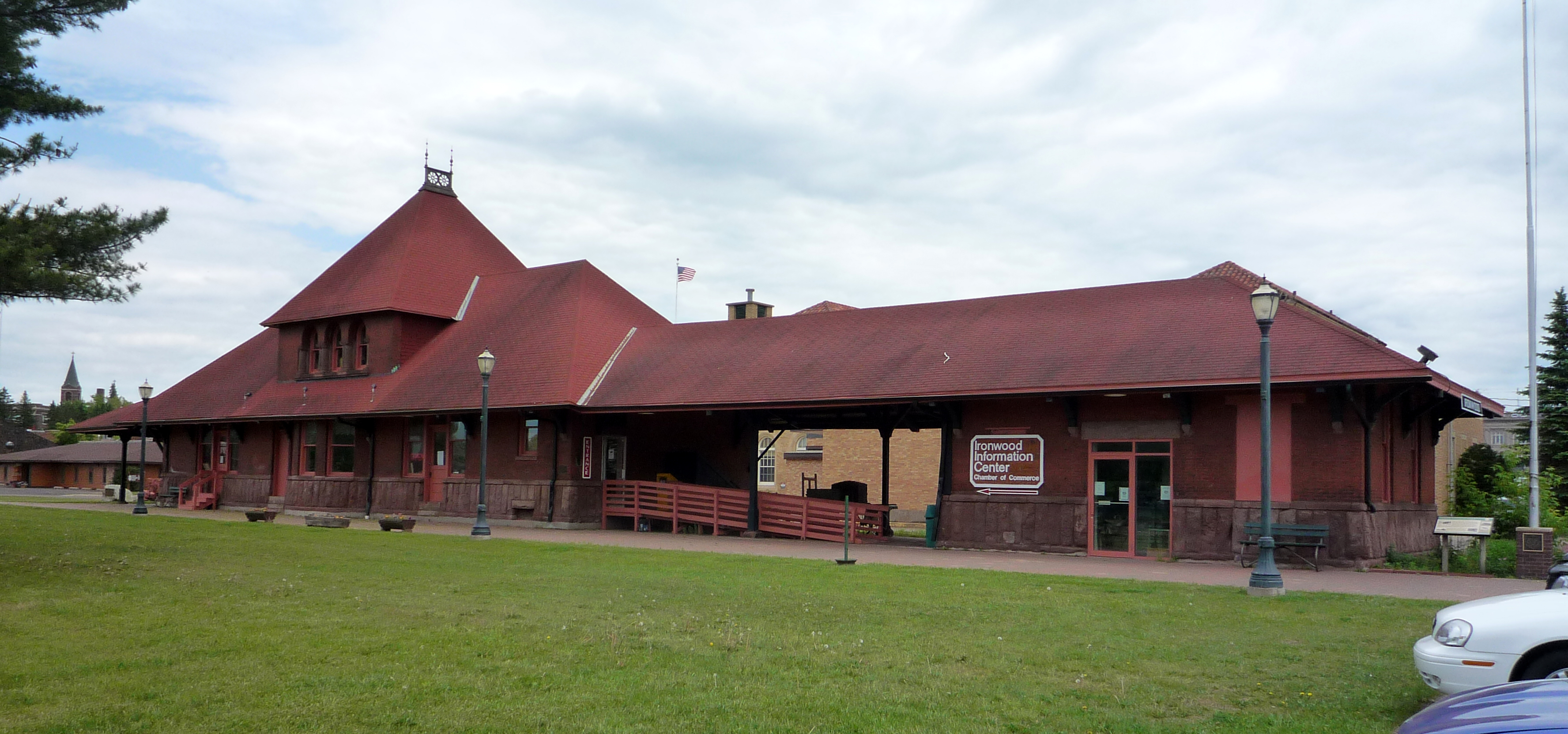
The Chicago and Northwestern Railroad Depot (now the Ironwood Historical Society), listed on the National Register of Historic Places

Ironwood has one high school, Luther L. Wright High School, informally known as Ironwood High School. Their mascot is the "Red Devils", a common description of the iron ore miners that would get covered with red dust from the iron ore. Luther L. Wright enjoys a rivalry with neighboring Hurley High. It is one of the longest-running interstate rivalries in American high school sports.

Ironwood was the home of the last parochial high school in Michigan's Upper Peninsula. Ironwood Catholic High School (formerly St. Ambrose School) closed after graduation of the senior class in 1985. Sister Mary Aquinas Kinskey taught aerodynamics and meteorology there before teaching aviation and aeronautics at Catholic University, her alma mater, to members of the United States Armed Forces.

The school's mascot was the ram, with the players known as the "Ramblers". The student yearbook was known as the "Loner" in recognition of its status as the last parochial school in this part of the state.

Ironwood is also the location of Gogebic Community College.

== Communications ==
=== Newspapers ===
- Ironwood Daily Globe

=== Radio stations ===
- WJMS (590 AM) Talk/Country
- WIMI (99.7 FM) Classic Rock
- WUPM (106.9 FM) Top 40
- WHRY (1450 AM) Oldies

== Television ==
Television stations serving Ironwood from Duluth

- KDLH 2 (The CW)
- KBJR-DT2 3 (CBS)
- KBJR 6 (NBC)
- WDSE 8 (PBS)
- KBJR-DT3 9 (MyNetworkTV)
- WDIO 10 (ABC)
- WDIO-DT2 10.2 (MeTV)
- KQDS 21 (Fox)
- KQDS-DT2 21.2 (Antenna TV)

== Sports ==
Ironwood is the only known place in the Upper Peninsula to ever host a professional sports team, the Northwest Football League's Gogebic Panthers in 1935 and 1936. Their 1935 campaign was immensely successful as the Panthers finished with a 6–1 record, their only loss coming to the eventual league champion La Crosse Old Style Lagers. Their 1936 campaign featured a 6–0 victory over the Madison Cardinals, who folded a few days after the Lagers defeated them 100–0 in an effort to kick them out of the league.

== Transportation ==
=== Highways ===
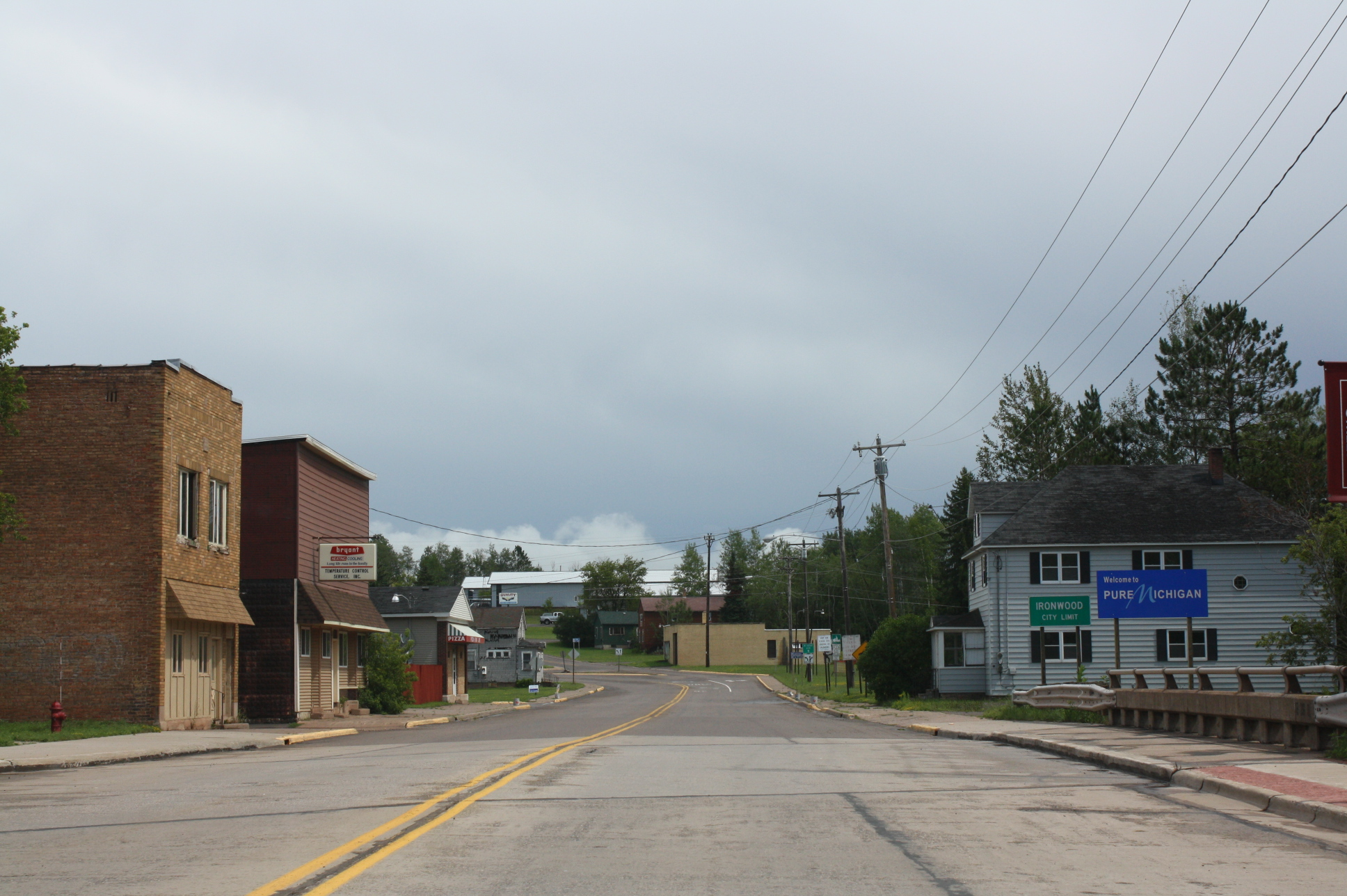
Entering Ironwood on Silver Street

- US Highway 2 (US 2) runs west to Ashland, Wisconsin and Duluth, Minnesota, and runs east to St. Ignace, Michigan.
- Business US 2 serves the city of Ironwood.
- M-28 begins in nearby Wakefield and runs east across the Upper Peninsula of Michigan to Marquette and ultimately to Sault Ste. Marie, Michigan.
- US 51 ends in nearby Hurley, Wisconsin.
- Wisconsin State Highway 77 (WIS 77) starts just across the state line in Hurley and travels southwesterly.
- County Road 505 (CR 505) runs north (as Lake Road) through Ironwood Township and runs by Little Girl's Point County Park on Lake Superior and eventually meets the northern terminus of WIS 122 at the Michigan–Wisconsin border near Saxon Harbor, and runs south (as Van Buskirk Road) through Erwin Township to meet the terminus of CTH-C in Oma, Wisconsin.
- CR 200 (Old County Road) begins at the east end of the city and runs east to Bessemer.
- CR 501 (Junet Road) begins at the northwest end of the city and runs north to meet CR 204 (Airport Road)}.

=== Bus service ===
Indian Trails provides daily intercity bus service between St. Ignace and Ironwood and between Ironwood and Duluth, Minnesota, while Gogebic County operates a small public bus system, Gogebic County Transit (LITTLE BLUE BUS).

=== Airport ===
Ironwood is served by the Gogebic–Iron County Airport (IWD), which provides commercial air service. Denver Air Connection provides scheduled commercial service to both Chicago O'Hare International Airport and Minneapolis-Saint Paul International Airport. MSP service was added on August 1, 2020. Located (7) nautical miles northeast of the city, the airport handles approximately 5,500 operations per year, with roughly 65% general aviation, 26% commercial service and 9% air taxi. The airport has a 6,502 foot asphalt runway with approved ILS, GPS and VOR/DME approaches (Runway 9-27).

=== Trails ===
The Iron Belle Trail uses Ironwood as one of its termini for the cross-state hiking and biking trails.

== Notable people ==
- Raymond Joseph Cannon, U.S. Representative from Wisconsin, attorney for Shoeless Joe Jackson and several of the Chicago Black Sox
- William S. Carlson, President of the University of Delaware, the University of Vermont, the State University of New York, and the University of Toledo
- Agnes Charbonneau, member of the Wisconsin State Assembly
- Renee Louise (Jacisin) Ellmers, member of the US House of Representatives of North Carolina, 2011–2017
- Jack Gotta, Canadian Football League player, coach, and general manager
- William C. Gribble Jr., United States Army Chief of Engineers; as commander of the US Army Corps of Engineers, began the tradition of the Gold Castles insignia which forms the basis for the current "Castle" logo of the Corps
- John Regeczi, football player and teammate of future president Gerald Ford on the University of Michigan undefeated national championship teams of 1932 and 1933
