= Rice Bay =

- U.S. National Register of Historic Places
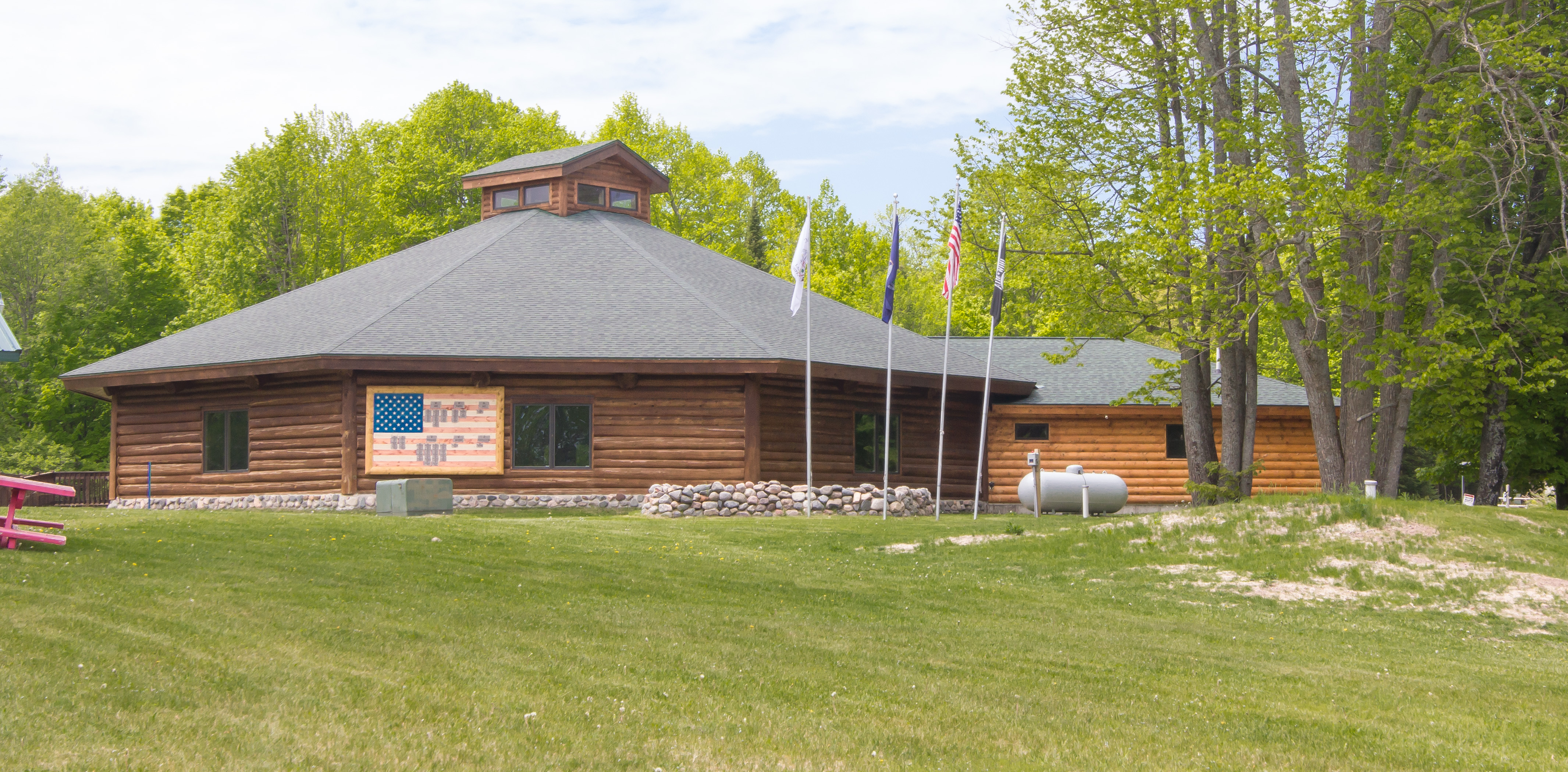

- Location within Michigan Location within the United States
- Interactive map
- Location: Indian Village Rd., Watersmeet Township, Michigan
- Coordinates: 46°8′44″N 89°4′29″W
- Area: 243 acres (98 ha)
- NRHP reference No.: 15000353
- Added to NRHP: December 2, 2015

Rice Bay, on the Michigan side of Lac Vieux Desert, contains a significant stand of wild rice traditionally managed and harvested by the Lac Vieux Desert Band of Lake Superior Chippewa Indians. The availability of wild rice, and the annual rice harvest, played a central role in Ojibwe migration to the area and led to the establishment of a seasonal, and later permanent, settlement in this location. The area was listed on the National Register of Historic Places in 2015.

== Description ==
Rice Bay covers about one-quarter square mile of the north-easternmost portion of Lac Vieux Desert, a 6.6 square-mile lake on the border between Michigan and Wisconsin. The lake is surrounded by swampland and forested, hilly terrain. Rice Bay averages about 7–8 feet in depth, with a maximum depth of 17 feet.

About one-half mile to the west of Rice Bay is the "Old Village" of Ketegitigaaning (also transcribed as "Katikitegon" or "Katakitckon"). The site features several community buildings, a boat launch, and an active cemetery, all of which are maintained and operated by the Lac Vieux Desert Band.

== History ==
According to oral traditions, Ojibwe living as far east as Niagara Falls migrated westward, following a prophecy directing them to seek "the food that grows upon the water." The Ojibwe migration culminated in the settlement of Madeline Island in Lake Superior by at least the late seventeenth century. These people began moving into the interior region in the mid-eighteenth century, seeking out wild rice beds. A summer village at Lac Vieux Desert was likely founded just after 1784, and was certainly well-established by 1792. The lake served as something of a crossroads, as two primary routes to Lake Superior crossed in this vicinity. By the 1840s, the village of Ketegitigaaning on Rice Bay contained a few hundred residents, and wild rice was being regularly harvested.

However, the 1842 "Copper Treaty" with the US government changed the dynamic of the settlement, and by the late 1840s many Ketegitigaaning residents were spending the summer months at L'Anse, due to the presence of a blacksmith as part of the treaty. A smallpox outbreak at Ketegitigaaning in 1851, as well as federal efforts to remove Native Americans from their lands, caused most residents to move to L'Anse. The 1854 Treaty of La Pointe attempted to consolidate multiple groups of Ojibwe, but the Lac Vieux Desert Band organized to purchase the land around Rice bay from the government, one parcel at a time. By the 1870s, wild rice harvesting was once more taking place at Rice Bay, and year-round occupancy of Ketegitigaaning began in the 1880s.

However, the arrival of the lumber industry prompted a slow but steady transition to the cash economy. By 1942, almost the entire community had moved to Watersmeet. However, the annual gathering of rice from Rice Bay continued, and still occurs in the present. Although the Lac Vieux Desert Band is headquartered in Watersmeet, the Old Village at Ketegitigaaning serves as a cultural center for the community.
