= Hanging Cloud =

Ojibwe female warrior (c. 1835-1919)

- Aazhaweyaagiizhigokwe
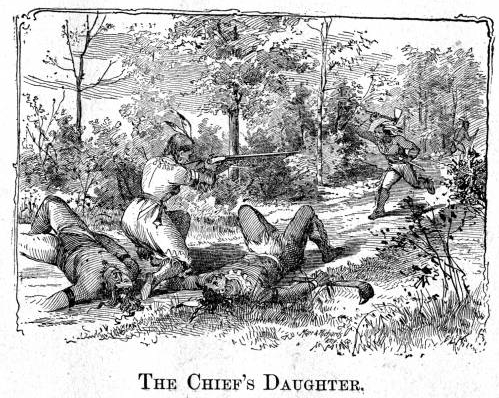
- Hanging Cloud depicted in an 1891 illustration
- Born: c. 1835
- Died: 1919 (aged 83–84)
- Other name: Aazhaweyaa
- Title: Ogichidaakwe
- Father: Nena'aangebi
- Relatives: Giishkitawag (brother)

Aazhaweyaagiizhigokwe, (Note: Also romanized Aazhawigiizhigokwe or Ah-shah-way-gee-she-go-qua.) known in English as Hanging Cloud or Hanging Cloud Woman and by her nickname Aazhaweyaa (Note: Also romanized Ashwiyaa or Ashweia.) was an Ojibwe warrior (Ojibwe: ogichidaakwe) of the Lac Courte Oreilles Band. She became well-known among the Ojibwe for being a skilled female warrior.

== Early life ==
Aazhaweyaa was born in the mid-1830s, the eldest daughter of ogimaa Nena'aangabi and his wife Nigooyoo, leader of the Rice Lake Ojibwe, which was the largest community within the Lac Courte Oreilles Band. Her brother was Giishkitawag. While fasting as an adolescent, she had a spiritual vision in which she accompanied her father in a war party and scalped a Dakota warrior. She insisted on joining her father's war party, something very unusual for a girl, and eventually her parents allowed it.

== Warrior ==
When Aazhaweyaa joined her father's expedition into Dakota territory, they ambushed a Dakota man on their way back. Aazhaweyaa successfully scalped him and they returned to Rice Lake. She was known for her speed, and important attribute in Ojibwe warrior culture. Her vision and successful return from a campaign made her famous among the Ojibwe of the time. Through the 1850s she continued to participate in warfare; when the Dakota attacked her father, she led a war party and killed and scalped two Dakota warriors. When she arrived in La Pointe for the annuity payment of 1855, she was received as a hero.

Richard Morse, writing in the 1850s, described Aazhaweyaa as a "Chippewa princess", who was "the only female who was allowed to participate in the dancing circles, war ceremonies, or to march in rank and file, to wear the plumes of the braves."

== Marriages and death ==
Aazhaweyaa's reputation as a warrior inhibited her ability to find an Ojibwe husband. She and all of her sisters married white men, which was rare for her particular community at the time.

Aazhaweyaa's first husband was Joe Koveo, a mixed white-Native man from Taylors Falls, Minnesota. They were married in Ojibwe custom at Long Lake, and moved to Taylors Falls. They had one daughter, Ogimaabinesikwe (English name Julia). Aazhaweyaa and her daughter moved back to Rice Lake when she found out that Koveo was already married.

Aazhaweyaa married her second husband, James Bracklin, in the early 1860s. Bracklin was a Knapp, Stout & Co. official originally from Maine. They had a daughter, Nellie, and a son, Thomas. Bracklin left Aazhaweyaa and moved to Eau Claire, where he married another woman in 1868. Despite this, their relationship did not end; after Aazhaweyaa had another son, James Bracklin Jr. After Bracklin moved back to Rice Lake in 1876, he attempted to take their children from the Lac Courte Oreilles reservation and enroll them in school. Aazhaweyaa repeatedly traveled to Rice Lake to retrieve her children.

Aazhaweyaa's third husband was another Knapp, Stout & Co. worker, Samuel Barker. Barker was known for having a particularly positive relationship with the local Ojibwe. They had two children, Edward and Mary Barker. Barker left Aazhaweyaa in 1873 and married another woman; this was common for white men, as more white women settled in northern Wisconsin.

In the 1890s Benjamin G. Armstrong wrote that Aazhaweyaa was still living in Rice Lake. She died in 1919, having been working as a housekeeper for a local lumber baron.

== Legacy ==
According to Priscilla Buffalohead, Aazhaweyaa "became something of a legend among her people". Robert Silbernagel describes her as "perhaps the most famous female Ojibwe warrior". Lac Courte Oreilles historian Erik Redix argues that Aazhaweyaa's life, having transitioned from a famous female warrior to a lumber baron's wife, is an example of how Ojibwe women experienced the marginalization of Natives in the mid-19th century.
