= Aamoons =

Ojibwe leader (1790s–1866)

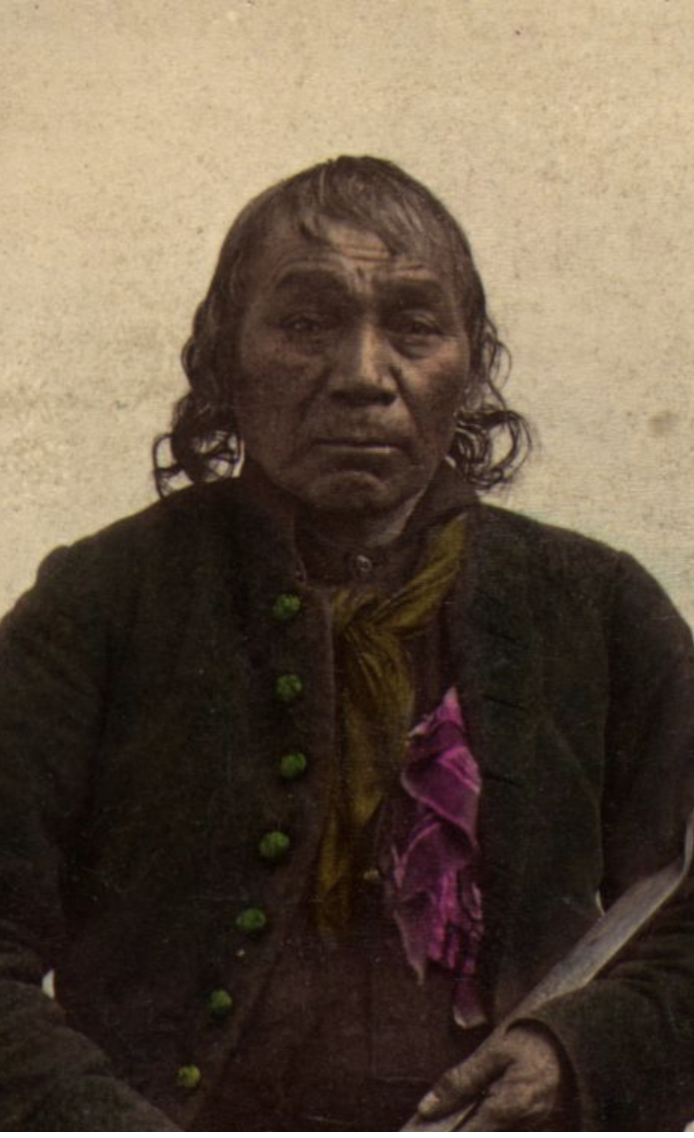
"Little Bee, Chippewa chief" hand-colored image by Whitney & Zimmerman (Denver Public Library Special Collections, Call Number X-32633)

Aamoons, or Little Bee, also rendered Ah-moose, Ah-mous, Aw-Mouse, Aw-monse, Bradford Ah-Moose, Ahmoons, or Wasp, (1795? – March 18, 1866) was a 19th century leader of the Ojibwe people of North America. He was the head chief of the Lac du Flambeau band (Waaswaaganiwininiwag) "whose hunting grounds are on the Wisconsin River". Aamoons traveled to the national capital of Washington, D.C. at least three times in the 1860s for meetings with the federal government about the status and treaty rights of the Ojibwe, who were at that time called the Chippewa.

Per William Whipple Warren's History of the Obijway (written in the early 1850s, published posthumously in 1885), Aamoons was the son of Waub-ish-gaug-aug-e (or White Crow, d. 1847), who was himself the son of Keesh-ke-mun. According to Benjamin Armstrong, Ah-Moose was part of a delegation that met with President Abraham Lincoln in 1862. The 1862 delegates were Ah-moose, or "Little Bee", from Lac Flambeau reservation; Kish-ke-taw-ug, or "Cut Ear", Bad River reservation; Ba-quas, or "He Sews", La Court O'Rielles reservation; Ah-do-ga-zik, or "Last Day", Bad River reservation; O-be-qnot, or "Firm", Fond du Lac reservation; Shing-quak-onse, or "Little Pine", La Pointe reservation; Ja-ge-gwa-yo, or "Can't Tell", La Pointe reservation; Na-gon-an, or "He Sits Ahead", Fond du Lac reservation; and O-ma-shin-a-way, or "Messenger", Bad River reservation.

Aamoons was also one of eight Ojibwe chiefs who traveled to Washington as part of a delegation to meet with the U.S. government in February 1863. He was said to be nearly 70 years old at the time of the 1863 trip, "yet hearty and strong in appearance. He traveled to Washington via locomotive by way of Chicago with Antoine Buffalo, Naw-wah-gah (the Foremost Sitter), Ah-me-wen-see (the Old Man), A-daw-we-go-zhig (On both sides the Sky), Keesh-ke-taw-wag (The Cut Ear), O-be-gwod (The Side), and Me-zhe-naw-wag (The Messenger). Aamoons was a monolingual Ojibwe-language speaker c. 1863.

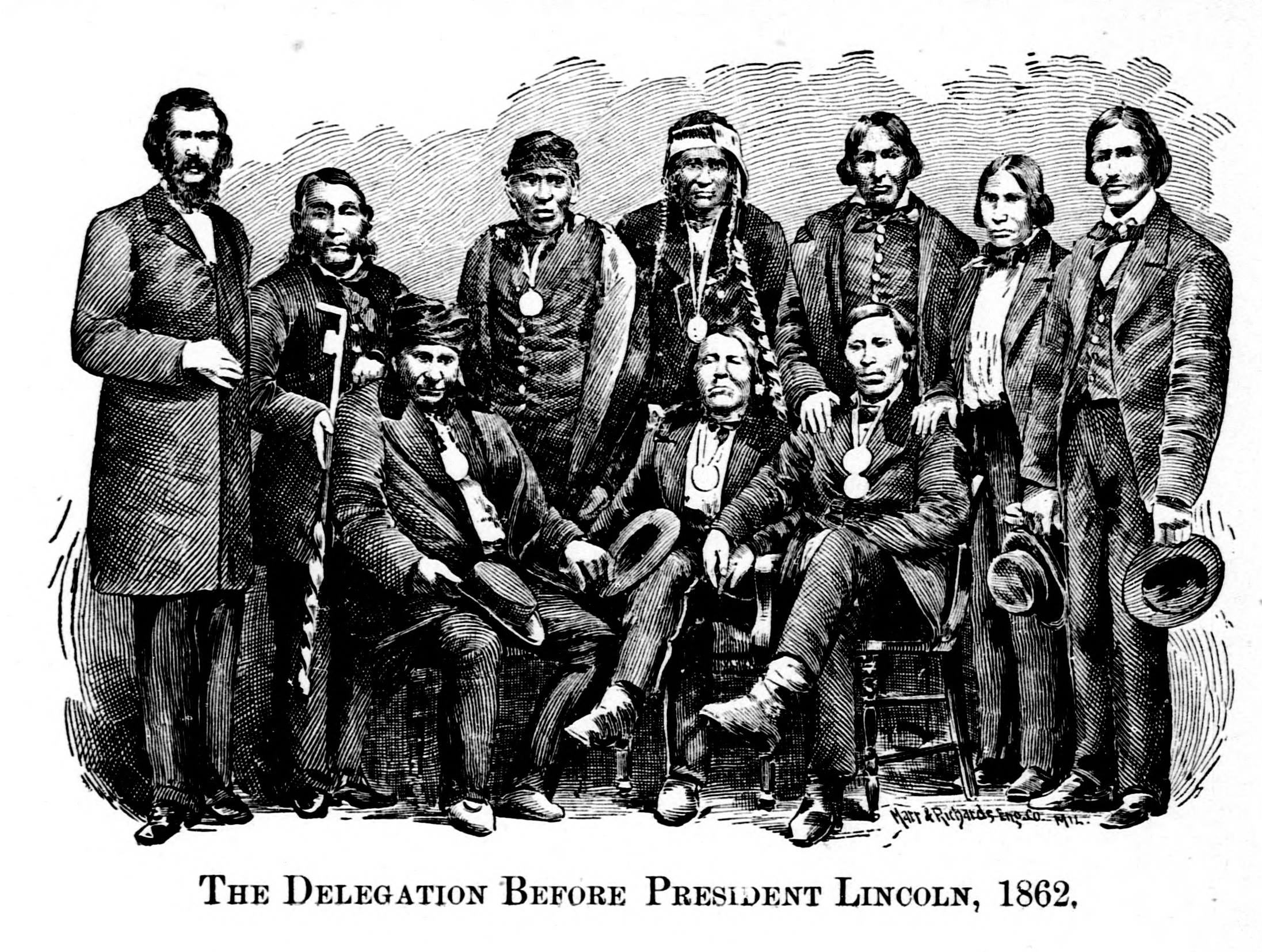
Ojibwe delegation to Washington 1861–1862; second from the left, top row, is likely "Ah-Moose"

He died in Washington, D.C., in October 1866, of "black measles" (Rocky Mountain spotted fever) while on a trip to meet with U.S. federal government officials about the status of the tribe. He was one of four members of the delegation who fell ill. His body was buried at the Congressional Cemetery.
