= Lac Vieux Desert Indian Reservation =

- Indian reservation
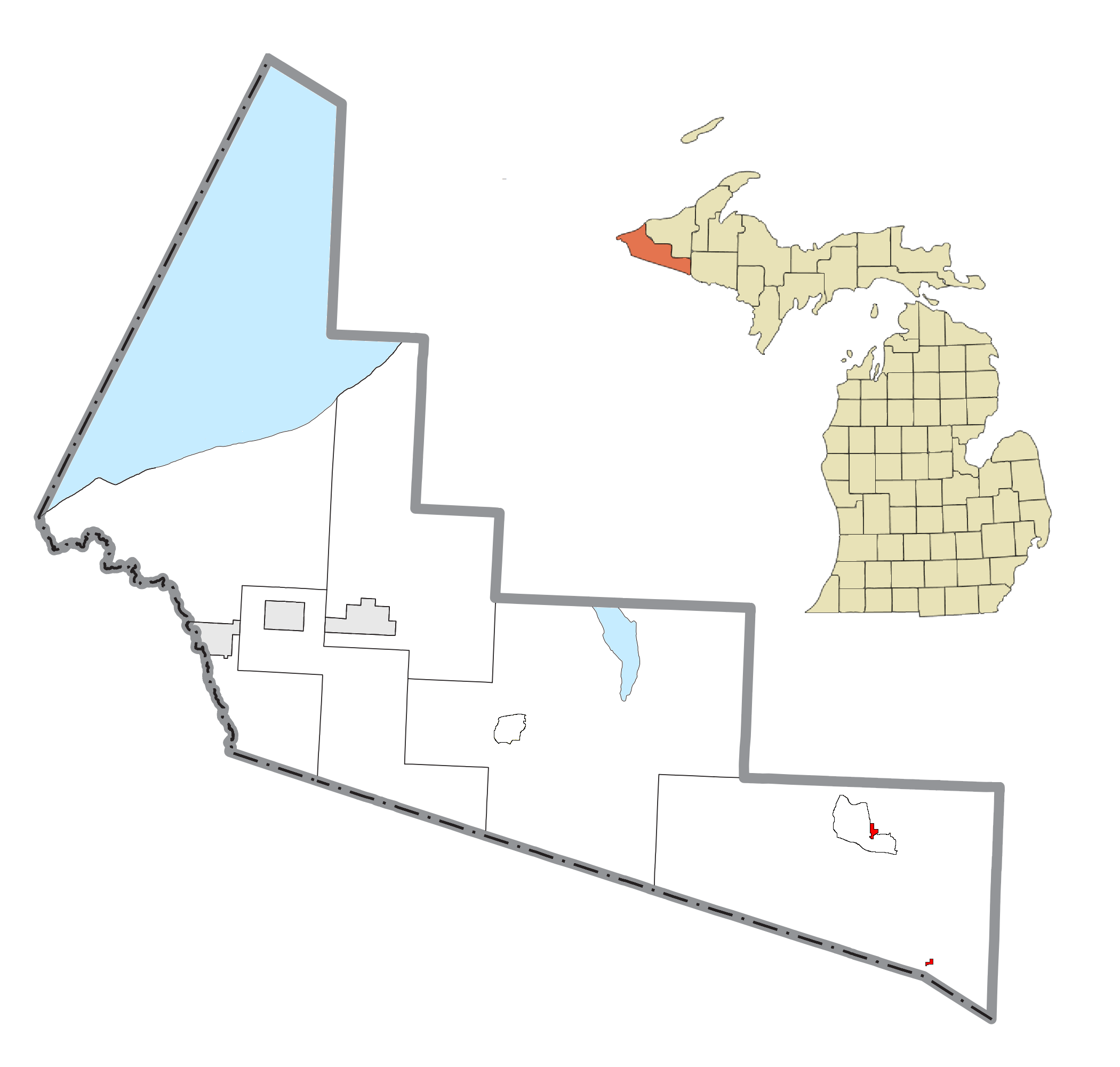
- Location within Gogebic County

- Location within the state of Michigan
- Coordinates: 46°16′10″N 89°10′40″W
- Country: United States
- State: Michigan
- County: Gogebic
- Established: 1988

Government
  - Type: Tribal Council
  - Chairman: James Williams, Jr.

Area
  - Total: 0.419 sq mi (1.09 km^{2})
  - Land: 0.419 sq mi (1.09 km^{2})
  - Water: 0.0 sq mi (0 km^{2})

Population (2020)
  - Total: 221
  - Density: 527.4/sq mi (203.6/km^{2})
- Time zone: UTC-6 (Central (CST))
  - Summer (DST): UTC-5 (CDT)
- ZIP code(s): 49969 (Watersmeet)
- Area code: 906
- Website: Official website

Lac Vieux Desert Indian Reservation is an Indian reservation located in Watersmeet Township of southeastern Gogebic County, in the western part of Michigan's Upper Peninsula. It is the landbase for the Lac Vieux Desert Band of Lake Superior Chippewa. According to the United States Census Bureau in 2020, the reservation has a land area of 0.419 square miles (268.16 acres; 1.09 km^{2}). The reservation consists of two sections in eastern Watersmeet Township. There were 221 people living on the reservation in the 2020 census.

== Demographics ==
=== 2020 census ===
As of the census of 2020, the population of the Lac Vieux Desert Reservation was 221. The population density was 527.4 inhabitants per square mile (203.6/km^{2}). There were 82 housing units at an average density of 195.7 per square mile (75.6/km^{2}). The racial makeup of the reservation was 85.5% Native American, 6.8% White, 0.5% Black or African American, 1.4% from other races, and 5.9% from two or more races. Ethnically, the population was 1.4% Hispanic or Latino of any race. The 2020 census results may be inaccurate for places like the Lac Vieux Desert Reservation owing to the Census Bureau's implementation of differential privacy protections.

Of the total reservation population, 205 people were living on the northern section in the unincorporated community of Watersmeet, Michigan. Some 16 persons lived in the southern section located on the north shore of Lac Vieux Desert, on the Michigan-Wisconsin border.

=== 2000 census ===
The 2000 census reported a total population of 135 residents. Most of the population lived in the 232.78-acre (0.9420 km^{2}) northern section in the unincorporated community of Watersmeet, near the junction of US routes 45 (US 45) and 2. Some 26 persons lived in the 95.26-acre (385,500 m^{2}) southern section, which is located on the north shore of Lac Vieux Desert, on the Michigan-Wisconsin border.
