= Giishkitawag =

Ojibwe chief (1838–1894)

Joe White
- Giishkitawag
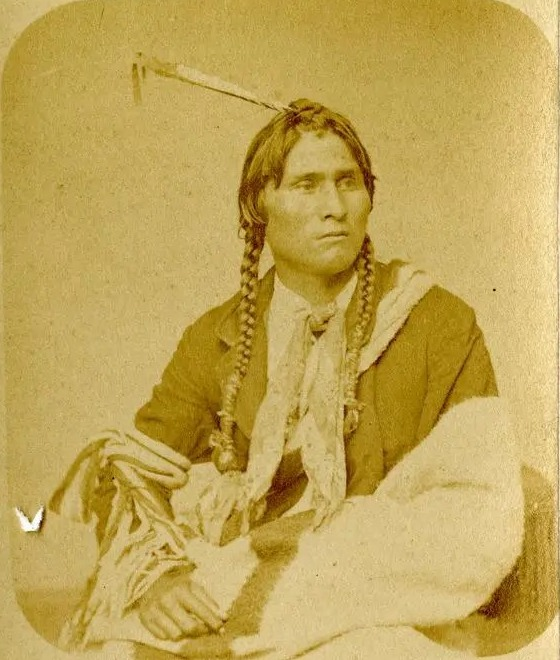
- Giishkitawag c. 1860s

Prairie Rice Lake Band of Lake Superior Chippewa Ogimaa
- In office 1877–1894
- Preceded by: Waabizheshi

Personal details
- Born: c. 1838
- Died: December 13, 1894 (aged 55–56)
- Relations: Aazhaweyaa (sister)
- Parent: Nena'aangebi (father)

Giishkitawag (lit. 'Cut-ear'), whose English name was Joe White, was chief (Ojibwe: ogimaa) of the Prairie Rice Lake band of Ojibwe in northern Wisconsin from 1877 until his murder in 1894. His murder by law enforcement officers and the subsequent acquittal of his killers is remembered as an example of the state of Wisconsin's violation of treaty rights and persecution of Ojibwe.

== Early life ==
Giishkitawag was born around 1838, one of three sons of Prairie Rice Lake Band ogimaa Nena'aangabi. His sister was the warrior Aazhaweyaa. He acquired the English name "Joe White" while working in a logging camp.

== As chief ==
Giishkitawag became ogimaa of the Rice Lake community following the murder of his older brother Waabizheshi in 1877. Giishkitawag sought retribution against the man who had killed both of his brothers Waabizheshi and Ininiins, fatally shooting him in 1878.

As ogimaa, he took a more confrontational approach against the American settlers and government than his brother had. Being the leader of an off-reservation community, he was continually at odds with federal officials. In January of 1878, the Barron County Board petitioned for the removal of the Rice Lake Ojibwe to the Lac Courte Oreilles reservation. Giishkitawag successfully resisted displacement. In the early 1880s he used sale of timber from allotted land to generate income for the Rice Lake community. Due to increasing white settlement in Barron County in the 1880s, the Rice Lake community began spending more of their time at Long Lake where there were fewer settlers.

The allotment of land at Lac Courte Oreilles in the 1880s resulted in the Rice Lake community relocating to allotted land near Whitefish Lake, in the west of the reservation. Despite this, many of Giishkitawag's community continued to spend time near Long Lake and Rice Lake, doing seasonal labor.

== Murder ==
On December 13, 1894, Giishkitawag was confronted by Deputy Game Warden Horace Martin and his assistant Josiah Hicks for hunting deer out of season, serving him a warrant from the Rice Lake municipal judge. Giishkitawag was traveling in a group with his wife, two of his children, and others from his community. Martin and Hicks separated Giishkitawag from the group at gunpoint, took their weapons, and tried to handcuff him. When he resisted, Martin struck him with handcuffs and Hicks beat him with a gun, resulting in a skull fracture. Giishkitiwag attempted to get up, and Hicks fatally shot him in the back. Martin and Hicks then fled the scene.

Despite having the legal right to, the federal government did not assume jurisdiction in the case and left it to the county courts. According to Lac Courte Oreilles historian Erik Redix, "The unwillingness of federal officials to assert jurisdiction in the case was not surprising and was consistent with federal policies that had assimilation as their objective. [...] Failure to enforce laws enacted to protect tribal sovereignty was just as effective as federal policies that directly attacked tribal sovereignty, such as allotment or boarding schools."

At an initial inquisition on December 20, a jury found that Giishkitawag had died due to a gunshot from Hicks, following Martin's order. Hicks and Martin were charged with murder and arrested. Both plead not guilty. On December 27, the defendants were arraigned. The defense claimed that Giishkitawag had attempted to stab Hicks and Martin, but this was contradicted by eyewitnesses. The trial was widely publicized in local newspapers, who were sympathetic to the defendants and published Martin's account of the incident without investigation. The sole exception was the Spooner Register, which noted that treaty law gave the Ojibwe full hunting and fishing rights in their ceded territory.

In March of 1895, the jury was selected. All of the jurors were white farmers from the southern part of the county, with few relationships with Natives. On March 21, the jury returned a verdict of not guilty after an hour of deliberation.

== Legacy ==
The killing of Giishkitawag and subsequent acquittal of his killers is remembered as an example of the state of Wisconsin's violation of treaty rights and persecution of Ojibwe. It has been compared to later incidents of treaty rights violations against Ojibwe hunting and fishing, such as the jailing of Andrew Blackbird in 1901, the jailing of Fred and Mike Tribble in 1972, and the Wisconsin Walleye War of the 1980s and 1990s. In those later cases, the treaty rights were upheld in federal and state courts.
