= Watersmeet Township, Michigan =

- Civil township
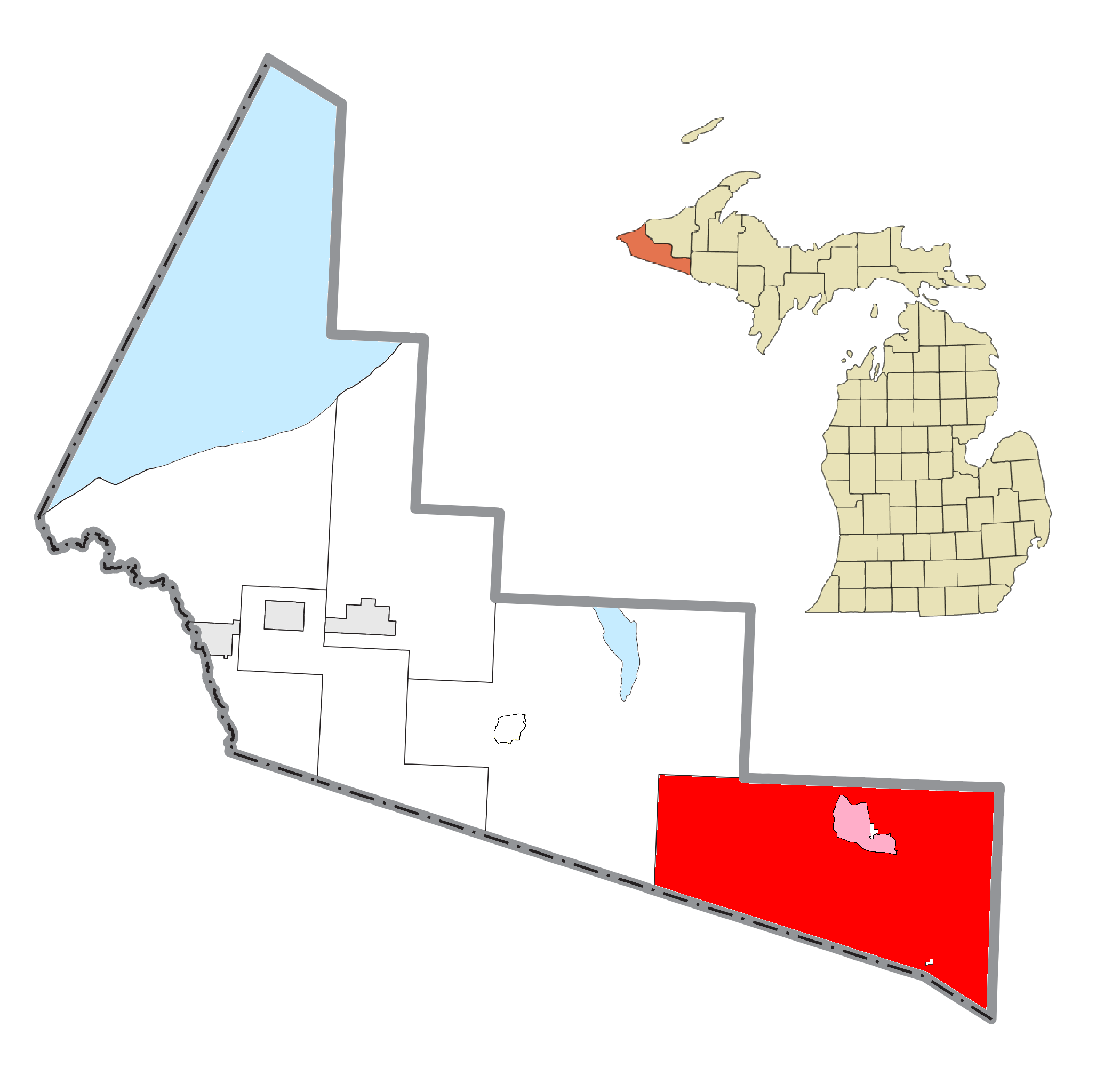
- Location within Gogebic County (red) and the administered community of Watersmeet (pink)

- Location within the state of Michigan
- Coordinates: 46°15′32″N 89°15′57″W
- Country: United States
- State: Michigan
- County: Gogebic

Government
  - Supervisor: Mike Rogers
  - Clerk: Sandy Mansfield

Area
  - Total: 277.8 sq mi (719.5 km^{2})
  - Land: 254.8 sq mi (659.8 km^{2})
  - Water: 23.1 sq mi (59.7 km^{2})
- Elevation: 1,736 ft (529 m)

Population (2020)
  - Total: 1,456
  - Density: 5.7/sq mi (2.2/km^{2})
- Time zone: UTC-6 (Central (CST))
  - Summer (DST): UTC-5 (CDT)
- ZIP code(s): 49969 (Watersmeet)
- Area code: 906
- FIPS code: 26-84380
- GNIS feature ID: 1627220
- Website: Official website

Watersmeet Township is a civil township of Gogebic County in the Upper Peninsula of the U.S. state of Michigan. The population was 1,456 in 2020.

The Lac Vieux Desert Indian Reservation is located in two small segments within Watersmeet Township.

== History ==
The Lac Vieux Desert Indian Reservation was established by treaty under the United States in 1854. The Lac Vieux Desert Band of Lake Superior Chippewa, part of the Lake Superior Band of Chippewa Indians, have occupied this territory since the 17th century. The band owns and operates a resort on the reservation, which includes a casino and golf course.

The unincorporated community of Watersmeet is within the township on the middle branch of the Ontonagon River near the junction of U.S. Highway 2 and U.S. Highway 45 at 46°16′04″N 89°10′40″W. The European-American community of Watersmeet was platted in 1884, designated as a station of the Chicago, St. Paul, Minneapolis & Omaha Railways.

The now-explained Lights of Paulding occur nearby.

== Schools ==
In late 2003 and early 2004, the boys' high school basketball team of the K-12 Watersmeet Township School was featured in a series of commercials on ESPN. ESPN chose Watersmeet for the commercials in part because of the school's sport teams' unusual nickname of Nimrods. The tag line of the commercials was "Without sports, who would cheer for the Nimrods?" The ads were so popular that the team, its coach, and octogenarian fan Dale Jenkins, all of whom were featured on the commercials, appeared on The Tonight Show on March 15, 2004.

The township and the Nimrods are the focus of an 8-part documentary, Nimrod Nation, which aired on The Sundance Channel. Filming started in September 2005 and continued until June 2006. Actor Robert Redford, one of the channel's owners and a champion of Native American issues, was reported to have been inspired to make the documentary when he learned that Watersmeet Township School's student body (and varsity basketball team) was approximately 50 percent Native American. The documentary won a Peabody Award in 2007.

Since that time, the township has consolidated schools. At the time, 9-12 grade enrollment was 78; the school system absorbed 13 of neighboring Marenisco's 60 K-12 students. The Watersmeet township high school enrollment in 2005-2006 enrollment was a total of 96.

== Geography ==
According to the United States Census Bureau, the township has a total area of 277.8 square miles (719 km^{2}), of which 254.8 square miles (660 km^{2}) is land and 23.0 square miles (60 km^{2}) (8.30%) is water.

=== Climate ===
The climate is described as Humid Continental by the Köppen Climate System, abbreviated as Dfb.

Climate data for Watersmeet, Michigan
Month	Jan	Feb	Mar	Apr	May	Jun	Jul	Aug	Sep	Oct	Nov	Dec	Year
Mean daily maximum °C (°F)	−6 (21)	−3 (26)	2 (36)	11 (51)	18 (65)	23 (74)	26 (78)	24 (76)	19 (66)	13 (55)	3 (37)	−3 (27)	11 (51)
Mean daily minimum °C (°F)	−17 (1)	−16 (3)	−10 (14)	−3 (27)	3 (38)	8 (47)	12 (53)	11 (51)	6 (43)	1 (34)	−6 (22)	−13 (9)	2 (36)
Average precipitation mm (inches)	41 (1.6)	28 (1.1)	43 (1.7)	58 (2.3)	89 (3.5)	100 (4)	91 (3.6)	94 (3.7)	91 (3.6)	71 (2.8)	58 (2.3)	46 (1.8)	810 (31.9)
Source: Weatherbase

== Demographics ==
As of the census of 2000, there were 1,472 people, 552 households, and 385 families residing in the township. In 2020, its population was 1,456.

== Transportation ==
Indian Trails provides daily intercity bus service between St. Ignace and Ironwood, Michigan.
