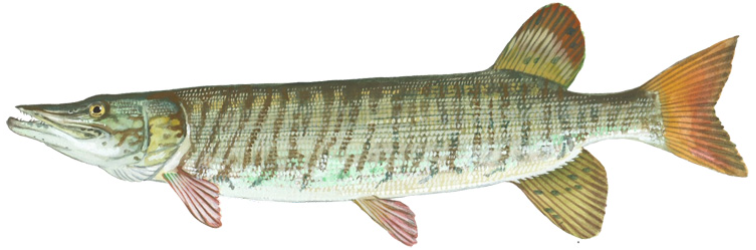

Scientific classification
- Kingdom: Animalia
- Phylum: Chordata
- Class: Actinopterygii
- Order: Salmoniformes
- Family: Esocidae
- Subfamily: Esocinae
- Genus: Esox
- Species: E. lucius × E. masquinongy

= Tiger muskellunge =

Hybrid fish

The tiger muskellunge (Esox masquinongy × lucius or Esox lucius × masquinongy), commonly called tiger muskie, is a carnivorous fish, and is the usually sterile, hybrid offspring of the true muskellunge (Esox masquinongy) and the northern pike (Esox lucius). It lives in fresh water and its range extends to Canada, the Northeast, and parts of the Midwest and Southern United States. It grows quickly; in one study, tiger muskie grew 1.5 times as fast as muskellunge. Like other hybrid species, tiger muskie are said to have "hybrid vigor", meaning they grow faster and stronger than the parent fish, and are also less susceptible to disease. Trophy specimens weigh about 14 kg (30 lb). Its main diet is fish and baby waterfowl. The tiger muskie and the muskie are called the fish of 10,000 casts due to the challenge involved in catching them.

== Distribution ==
The tiger muskie lives in the lakes and quiet rivers in Canada, the Great Lakes, the Upper Mississippi Valley, and the Ohio and St. Lawrence Rivers. It is found the most in Michigan. It is rarely found far from its natural waters except for stocked fish. Several states, including Minnesota, New Hampshire, New York, Washington, Massachusetts, Arkansas, Montana, Idaho, Utah, Colorado, New Mexico, and Wyoming stock tiger muskies. Tiger muskie were once stocked in Michigan, but are no longer raised in Michigan state fish hatcheries. Each tiger muskie tends to inhabit the same areas of its lake from year to year. It tends toward shallower waters (2–3 m or 6–9 ft deep) and travels half as much in the summer and fall as it does in the winter to spring, when it prefers deeper waters (5–9 m or 15–30 ft deep).

== Characteristics ==
The tiger muskie is the result of the true muskellunge (Esox masquinongy) and the northern pike (Esox lucius) interbreeding. The tiger muskie has some of the characteristics of both fish. Tiger muskie, like pike and muskellunge, have long, cylindrical-shaped bodies. Their dorsal and ventral fins are located far back near the tail and are lobe-shaped. The caudal fins of the tail are more rounded than those of true muskies. They have skinny and compressed heads and the bottom jaw is elongated with an upward curve, known as a duckbill-shape. Its pattern is varying amounts of color with vertical dark stripes and spots on a light background, the opposite color scheme of a northern pike. The tiger muskie has 5 or 6 chin pores per side on the lower jaw.

== Diet ==
The tiger muskie feeds as the northern pike and muskellunge do, by waiting near weeds and ambushing its prey. They have food preferences similar to those of the true muskie and northern pike as well. Their diet changes seasonally, due to a slower metabolism in the winter and spring months. Its varied diet includes yellow perch, suckers, golden shiners, walleye, smallmouth bass, and various other types of fish. When fish are not readily available tiger muskies will feed on crayfish, frogs, young waterfowl, muskrats, mice, and other small mammals.

== Growth and survival ==
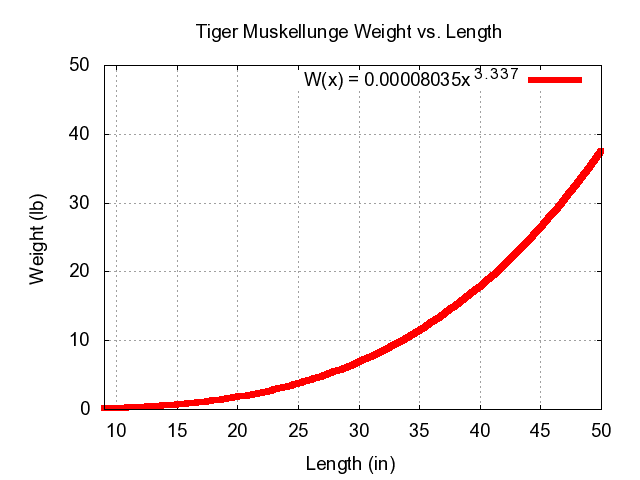

State-record tiger muskie catches are recorded as 4.5 kg (10 lb) depending on the state, with northern states yielding larger specimens.

Because tiger muskies are bred for stocking purposes, studies have been made of its growth rate and the factors that affect it. The growth rate of juveniles depends on the water temperature and the type of feed. In studies, the tiger muskie has had the highest growth, production, and food conversion efficiency at temperatures of 20–24 °C (68–75 °F). Below these temperatures, growth rates slow and above them cannibalism increases.

Several studies have examined the effect of stocking size on survival of stocked tiger muskellunge. This information helps those involved in wildlife management to make cost-effective decisions about breeding and stocking programs. Larger size at stocking has been correlated with higher survival rates and the effect is large enough that it is usually cost-effective to stock larger juveniles (180 – 205 mm)

As tiger muskies grow longer, they increase in weight. The nonlinear relationship between total length (L, in inches) and total weight (W, in pounds) for nearly all species of fish can be expressed by an equation of the form: $W = cL^b\!\,$

Invariably, b is close to 3.0 for all species, and c is a constant that varies among species. A relationship based on 27 populations of tiger muskie from 9 states was used to develop a specific equation for tiger muskie and computed that c = 0.00008035 and b = 3.337. This relationship predicts that a 84 cm (33 in) tiger muskie will weigh about 4.5 kg (10 lb), and a 120 cm (47 in) tiger muskie will weigh about 14 kg (30 lb).

== Reproduction ==
Cross-breeding of the true muskellunge and the northern pike occurs naturally in the wild where both parent species occur. The tiger muskie is sterile, which is not unusual for a hybrid fish. Breeders prefer to breed male northern pike and female muskellunge, because the eggs are less adhesive and have less tendency to clump when hatching. While some tiger muskie occur naturally, most are bred in hatcheries. Tiger muskie usually grow more quickly than the pure-strain muskie and northern pike in the first several years. They can also endure high temperatures better than the parent fish and they grow more quickly, reaching legal size sooner and making them more useful in stocking.

== Angling ==
The tiger muskie is stocked regularly in some lakes, and people go to great lengths to obtain a tiger muskie, but it is not an easy fish to catch. Some people say that it takes 10,000 casts to catch one. The current International Game Fish Association (IGFA) all-tackle world record tiger muskie is a 23.21-kilogram (51 lb 3 oz) specimen that was caught on July 16, 1919, by John Knobla at Lac Vieux-Desert, Michigan, while the current IGFA all-tackle length world record, pending as of August 18, 2024, is a 115-centimetre (45 in) individual caught on May 20, 2024, by angler Daniel Caricaburu-Lundin in Ackley Lake, Hobson, Montana.

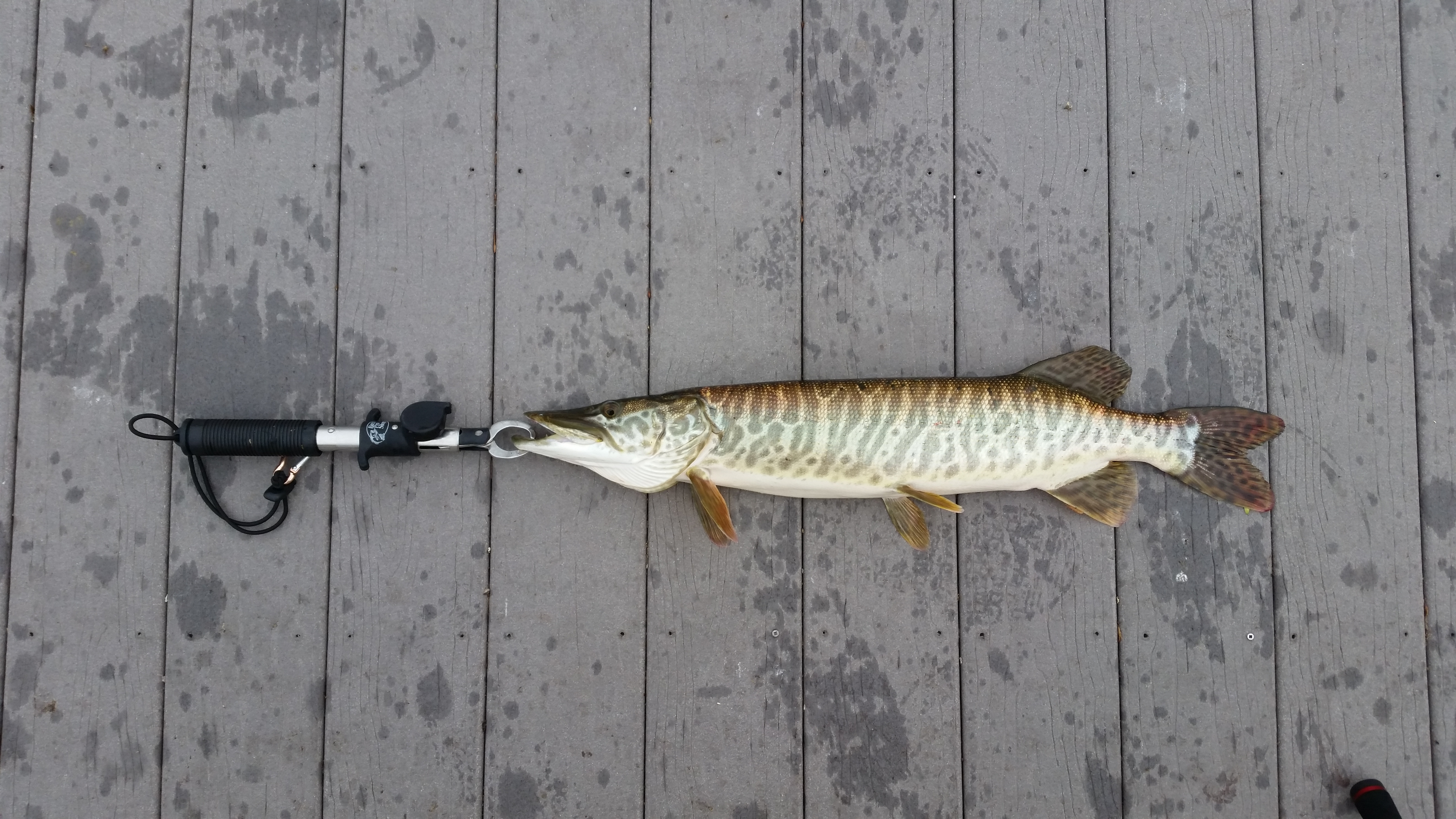
A tiger muskie in preparation to be measured (26.5 inches). Released.

=== Sport ===
The tiger muskie is renowned as a sport fish because it can reach sizes over 130 cm (50 in) long. They can be caught in lakes and reservoirs in locations with plenty of forage. Being large, powerful fish, they can be difficult to manage. The best way to catch a tiger muskie is to get the fish to the side of the boat as quickly as possible so the fish does not become exhausted; this is especially important during the summer months. Using a large landing net, scoop the fish onto the boat making sure it does not flop around too much; fish often hurt themselves by thrashing wildly in boats. Quickly grip over the top of the gill plates, but be careful of the gills because they can tear easily and are very sharp. Make sure to use pliers when removing the hook because tiger muskies have many sharp teeth.

Like many other predatory fish, muskies like to hide in the edge of weed beds so they can ambush prey. They can also be found in areas where they have quick access to open parts of the lake. Unlike other fish muskies seem to feed when the weather and atmospheric pressure stay consistent, rain or shine. Catching tiger muskie is usually done by trolling at speeds between 4 and 6 miles per hour, but they have been caught trolling faster and slower.

Contrary to popular folklore, muskie will hit at any size fishing lure: the lure does not have to be huge. The lure size should vary depending on the amount of weeds in the area or at the depth you wish to fish. In open water, larger lures such as Jointed Rapalas, Loke Lures, Ziggy Lures, Willy Lures, Wiley Lures, Large Mepps Bucktails, Muskie Plugs, large spinner baits or long shallow running Rapalas can be effective. Usually, Fire-Tiger and Perch-color work best during the day time and red lures work better in the evening.

When fishing in weeds it is better to use smaller lures. 10 to 13 cm (4 to 5 in) Original Floating Rapalas, or Thundersticks work very well. Smaller Jointed Rapalas and smaller spinner baits are effective too.
