= Beautifying Bird =

Ojibwe leader

- Nenaa'angebi
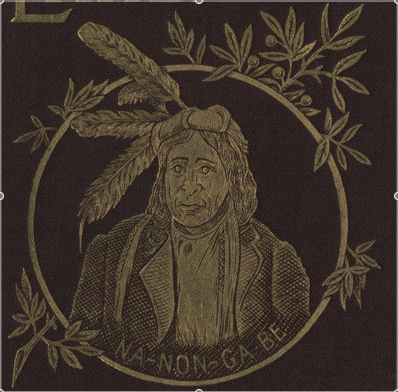

Prairie Rice Lake Band, Lake Superior Chippewa leader
- Succeeded by: Wabashish

Personal details
- Born: c. 1794
- Died: 1855
- Spouse: Niigi'o or Niguio
- Children: Wabashish (John White); Giishkitawag (Joe White); Poskin (Mary Goose); Wabikwe (Charlotte "Lottie"); Chingway (Maggie White); Aazhawigiizhigokwe ("Ashaweia")

Nenaa'angebi (Note: As written in the two-vowel orthography of Ojibwe, meaning "[Bird that] Fixes-up Its Wing-feathers". Also written as Nay-naw-ong-gay-be, Na-naw-ong-ga-be, Na-non-ga-be, Ne-na-nang-eb) (c. 1794–1855), known in English as Beautifying Bird or Dressing Bird, was a principal chief of the Prairie Rice Lake Band of the Lake Superior Chippewa, originally located near Rice Lake, Wisconsin. He served as the principal chief about the middle of the 19th century.

He was noted chiefly as an orator, and as the father of Aazhawigiizhigokwe (Hanging Cloud), who was the only Ojibwe woman ever to earn full ogichidaakwe (warrior) status.

The Wisconsin Historical Society claims that Nay-naw-ong-gay-be is described as having been of "less than medium height and size," and having "intelligent features."

== Family ==
Chief Nenaa'angebi was of the Nibiinaabe-doodem (Merman Clan), according to the Wisconsin Historical Society and the Lac Courte Oreilles Band of Lake Superior Chippewa Indians. He was a twin son of Chief Ozaawindib, sometimes recorded as being of the Lac Courte Oreilles Band. Ozaawindib gave away the twin brother of Nenaa'angebi to the community of the Snake River sub-band of the Biitan-akiing-enabijig ("Border-sitters"), an Ojibwa-Dakota group, in order to make peace with them and to provide them with a hereditary chief. That son became known as Chief Shagobay/Zhaagobe.

Chief Nenaa'angebi's wife was Niigi'o (recorded as "Niguio"). They had two sons and four daughters.

== Life ==
Chief Nenaa'angebi was a treaty signatory to the 1842 and 1854 Treaties of La Pointe. His Band was consolidated with Lac Courte Oreilles Band of Lake Superior Chippewa Indians after the 1854 Treaty of La Pointe and assigned land to a common reservation. Before he could see the promises of the 1854 Treaty fulfilled, he died in 1855.

Chief Nenaa'angebi was buried near the high hill at Prairie Farm. The Wisconsin Historical Society installed a historic marker nearby to memorialize this site. The Society also honored him with a portrait of Chief Nenaa'angebi in its library in Madison, Wisconsin, according to a 1933 letter from the Society to his grandson, Thomas Jefferson Bracklin.

== Legacy ==
"Wabashish", the eldest son, succeeded his father as Chief of the Prairie Rice Lake community of the Lac Courte Oreilles Band. However, shortly afterward, Shák'pí lead an ambush on the band. Chief Nenaa'angebi's wife Niigi'o was seriously injured in this raid, and later died. Niigi'o was buried near the west bank of the Red Cedar River on the north end of Rice Lake, Wisconsin. Wisconsin Highway 48 was constructed a few feet away from the site. In defending her village during the ambush, Aazhawigiizhigokwe killed Shák'pí's son, her own cousin.

== Quotation ==
My father, I was here last year, when the treaty was made, and I swallowed the words of the treaty down my throat, and they have not yet had time to blister on my breast.

— Nenaa'angebi, late summer of 1855, in reference to Treaty of La Pointe
