= Lac du Flambeau Band of Lake Superior Chippewa =

Ojibwe Native American tribe

Coordinates: 45°59′05″N 89°52′38″W

Waaswaaganing
- Tribal flag

Total population
- 3415 (2010)

Regions with significant populations
- United States (Wisconsin)

Languages
- English, Ojibwe

Related ethnic groups
- other Ojibwe people

Location of Lac du Flambeau Indian Reservation

The Lac du Flambeau Band of Lake Superior Chippewa (called Waaswaaganing in Ojibwe) is a federally recognized Ojibwe Native American tribe. It had 3,415 enrolled members as of 2010. The Lac du Flambeau Indian Reservation lies mostly in the Town of Lac du Flambeau in south-western Vilas County, and in the Town of Sherman in south-eastern Iron County in the U.S. state of Wisconsin. It has a land area of 107.1 square miles (277.4 km^{2}) and a 2020 census resident population of 3,518. Its major settlement is the unincorporated Lac du Flambeau, which had a population of 1,845.

Located at Waaswaagani-zaaga'igan (French: Lac du Flambeau; English: Torch Lake), the reservation of the Lac du Flambeau Band was established under the Treaty of 1854. The band had occupied this area since 1745, when it defeated the Sioux in the last battle between the peoples, driving them to the west. The Ojibwe had gradually migrated over centuries from the Atlantic coast.

With renewed self-government under a written constitution in the 20th century, the Lac du Flambeau Band have established enterprises to build on their natural resources.

== Tribal settlement ==
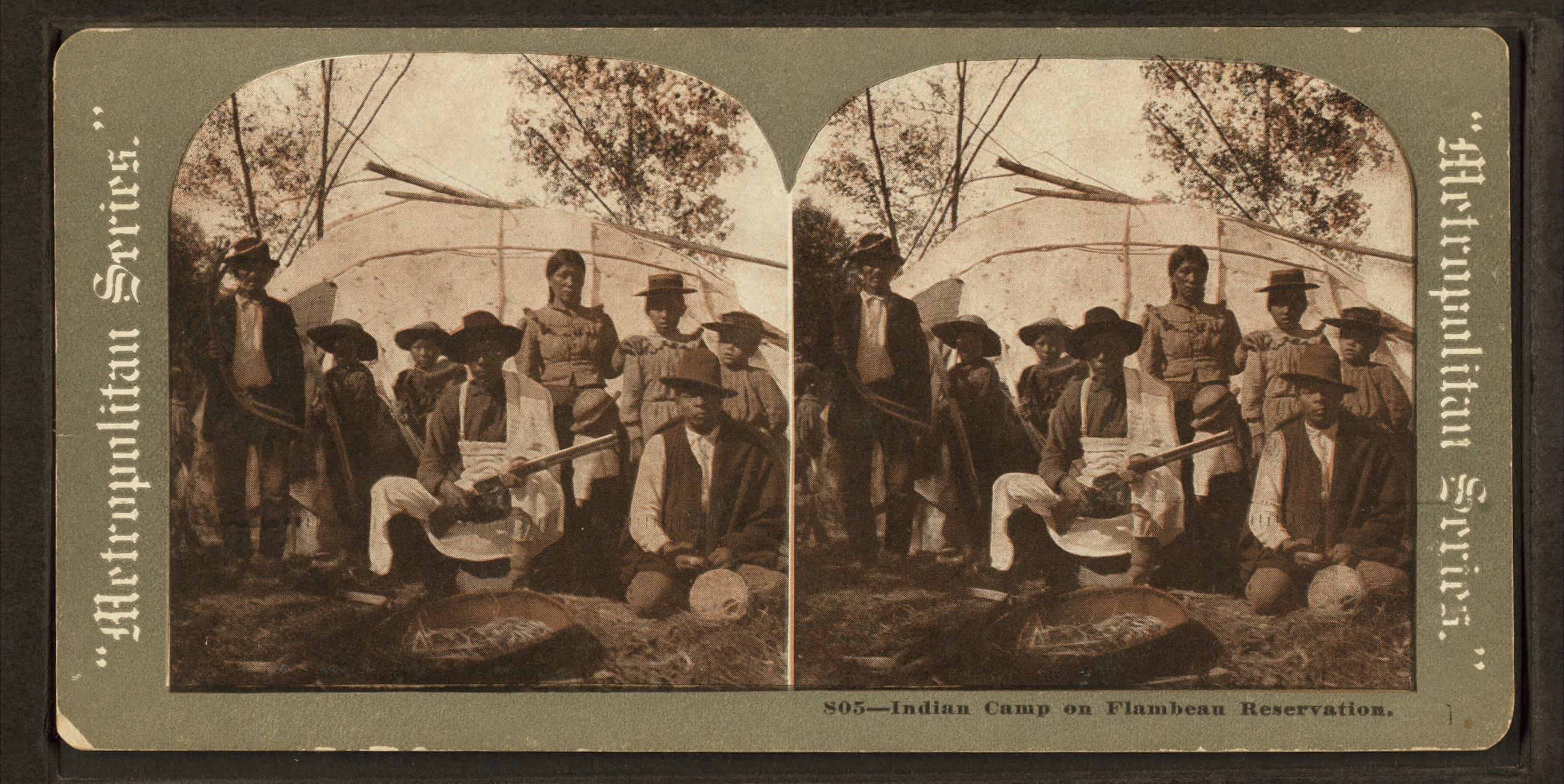
Indian camp on Flambeau reservation

The ancestors of the Lac du Flambeau Band and other bands moved west from the Michigan area in the 17th century into the interior of Wisconsin west and south of Lake Superior. They were called the Waaswaaganininiwag (the "Torch Lake Men"). French fur traders named the band and lake for the Ojibwe practice of catching fish at night on the lake by torchlight.

According to the Lac du Flambeau Band, they settled permanently in the area in 1745, led by their Chief Keeshkemun. He helped them defeat the Sioux (Dakota) that year, who had long occupied this area. The last battle between them and these Chippewa took place on Strawberry Island in the lake.

The larger competition for resources between the Dakota and the Lake Superior Chippewa had begun in 1737 and continued for nearly 100 years before the Chippewa pushed out the Dakota and the Meskwaki tribes from the Wisconsin interior.

The Waaswaaganininiwag constituted the eastern group of the Biitan-akiing-enabijig (Border Sitters), a sub-Nation of the Gichigamiwininiwag (the Lake Superior Men, also known as Lake Superior Chippewa). Others members of the eastern Biitan-akiing-enabijig included bands located on Pelican Lake, Lac Vieux Desert, Turtle Portage, Trout Lake and Wisconsin River.

For centuries, the lake Waaswaagani-zaaga'igan served as the trade and transportation hub for Native Americans and later colonial traders, as it connected the waterways between Lake Superior (via the Montreal River) and the Wisconsin and Flambeau rivers. Traders used the lake and rivers to pass back and forth through their far-flung network. They also had to use the Flambeau Trail to portage from Lake Superior to the Lac du Flambeau District. The trail was 45 miles long, with 120 "pauses" created along the path to give portagers a break, an indication of the rough country.

As part of the Lake Superior Chippewa and signatories to the 1854 Treaty of La Pointe, the bands at Pelican Lake, Turtle Portage, Trout Lake and Wisconsin River were consolidated into the Lac du Flambeau Band (Waaswaaganing in Ojibwe). As signatories to the Treaty of St. Peters of 1837, and the Treaties of La Pointe of 1842 and 1854, members of the Lac du Flambeau Band enjoy the traditional hunting, fishing and gathering practices guaranteed in these treaties.

Like other tribes, the band had much of it land allotted to individual households under the Dawes Act of the early 20th century, intended to encourage assimilation to European-American style property holding and farming. This led to the loss of tribal ownership of some of the land within the reservation.

In 2025, a Catholic retreat center located on the shore of Trout Lake was returned to the Lac du Flambeau Band of Lake Superior Chippewa, in one of the first transfers of land from Catholic sisters to a tribal government.

== Strawberry Island ==
In the 20th century under the Dawes Act, Strawberry Island was assigned to a tribal member as part of the allotment of tribal lands to individual households, a federal attempt to force assimilation. When he died, a non-Native family bought the island in 1910, using it for years for summer camping vacations. It has remained undeveloped since the 18th century.

The Lac du Flambeau Band consider Strawberry Island sacred, and call it "the place of the little people" or spirits according to tribal tradition. They consider it the heart of their reservation. As the island was used by indigenous cultures for more than 2,000 years, the tribe wants to keep it undeveloped for its historical, cultural and spiritual significance. The band believes that warriors were buried there as the island was the last battle site between these Ojibwe and the Lakota Sioux in 1745. In 1966, an archaeological survey by a professor at Beloit College revealed that the island has human remains, and layers of artifacts dating to 200 BC.

Listed in 1978 on the National Register of Historic Places, it is described as "one of the most important archeological sites in northern Wisconsin" by Robert Birmingham, as state archeologist in 1995. From the 1990s onward, the tribe tried to buy the island. As lakefront property is valuable, the family and tribe were unable to agree on a price for the 26-acre island (11 ha), which has 4,700 feet (1,400 m) of lakefront. The Trust for Public Land has assisted the tribe.

The owners did not concede that the island may never be developed, although one development proposal was stopped in 1996 by a building permit challenge. The tribe owns all the land surrounding the island and controlled access to it. An appeals court in 2003 affirmed the denial of the building permit, with the judge ruling that, as the island was within the boundaries of the tribe's reservation, the band should determine its future. The case continued, as the tribe and owners sought mediation but were still unable to agree on a price.

In 2008, Bonnie Mills-Rush, manager of the LLC that owns the island, assigned a lease and control to Bill Poupart, a member of the Lac du Flambeau Band. While at time the tribe did not own the land, Poupart was given authority to determine its use and agreed on its sacred nature.

On December 23, 2013, the tribe purchased the island from the Mills family for $250,000. The tribe held a "Strawberry Island Closing and Drum Ceremony" at the William Wildcat Sr. Community Center on December 30, 2013, in celebration of the acquisition. The deed was signed at the ceremony, bringing to an end years of uncertainty and contention surrounding the island.

== Government ==
In the 20th century, the tribe re-established its own government under a written constitution. It elects a council and president. The council establishes membership rules for the tribe, and provides government services to the reservation. It has developed a number of businesses: LDF Industries (pallet manufacturing), Ojibwa Mall, campground, fish hatchery, gas station, and cigarettes and tobacco shop. Together with the resort described below, it is working to develop enterprises that preserve and build on the natural resources of the reservation.

The tribe established the Lake of the Torches Economic Development Corporation to develop and operate the Lake of the Torches resort and casino, intended to generate revenue and also provide employment to members of the tribe. When the casino did not yield expected profits, the tribe encountered repayment difficulties with the creditors it had engaged to help finance the casino. A dispute with the casino's creditors ensued, as they tried to take control of its assets by receivership, under the terms of the bond indenture. When the case went to court, "the district court denied the motion to appoint a receiver and dismissed the lawsuit on the grounds that the trust indenture was a "management contract" under the IGRA [Indian Gaming Regulatory Act] which lacked the required approval of the NIGC Chairman." The creditors appealed the decision.

In Wells Fargo Bank, N.A. v. Lake of the Torches Economic Development Corporation (2011), the United States Court of Appeals for the Seventh Circuit agreed that the bond indenture constituted a management contract and was invalid. It contained provisions that permitted lenders to influence the management of a tribal casino, for instance, preventing the tribe from changing operating officials without bondholder approval, and others that encroached on tribal authority, without having gained required approval of the indenture/contract by the National Indian Gaming Commission. The provisions together gave a "great deal of authority in an entity other than the tribe to control the Casino's operations," which was not in keeping with the law on Indian gaming. The Seventh Circuit decision requested additional guidance from the United States Congress and /or the National Indian Gaming Commission regarding the "rules of the road" for tribal casino financing.

== Lending business ==
In 2012, the Lac du Flambeau Band entered the lending business, and has subsequently set up at least 24 lending companies and websites under the corporate umbrella of LDF Holdings. As of 2024 LDF Holdings employed 170 people on or near the reservation, of whom 70% were enrolled tribal members, and profits from the tribe's lending business are distributed to the tribe's general fund. An annual gathering of lending staff, vendors, and prospective partners known as the Tribal Lending Summit is held each year on reservation land.

A 2024 analysis by ProPublica found that approximately 4,800 bankruptcy cases per year, one percent of all bankruptcy cases in the United States, involved a company owned by the Lac du Flambeau Band, the highest frequency of any Native American tribe involved in the payday loan industry. Companies owned by the Lac du Flambeau Band have also accumulated more than 2,200 consumer complaints routed to the Federal Trade Commission since 2019, more than any other tribe.

Since 2019, the Lac du Flambeau band has been subject to at least 40 civil lawsuits involving its lending practices, with most suits being quickly settled. In 2020, a federal class-action lawsuit was filed in Virginia against members of the Lac du Flambeau Band governing council, high-level employees of the Lac du Flambeau Band's lending companies, as well as nontribal business partners, with the plaintiffs alleging that the defendants conspired to violate state lending laws, following a 2021 federal appeals court ruling that found that tribal lending constitutes off-reservation conduct to which state law applies. In 2024, a settlement was reached in the suit, calling for the cancellation of $1.4 billion in outstanding loans affecting approximately 980,000 people who were customers of the tribe's lending companies, with tribal officials and their associates agreeing to pay an additional $37.4 million in cash to the plaintiffs and their lawyers.

== Reservation demographics ==
As of the census of 2020, the population of the Lac du Flambeau Reservation was 3,518. The population density was 32.9 inhabitants per square mile (12.7/km^{2}). There were 3,202 housing units at an average density of 29.9 per square mile (11.5/km^{2}).

The Lac du Flambeau Reservation has a significant non-native population due in part to the allotment and sale of reservation lands in the early twentieth century. The racial makeup of the reservation in 2020 was 58.6% Native American, 37.3% White, 0.2% Black or African American, 0.3% from other races, and 3.5% from two or more races. Ethnically, the population was 2.7% Hispanic or Latino of any race.

According to the American Community Survey estimates for 2016-2020, the median income for a household in the reservation was $41,095, and the median income for a family was $51,538. Male full-time workers had a median income of $42,155 versus $27,563 for female workers. The per capita income for the reservation was $26,048. About 16.9% of families and 20.6% of the population were below the poverty line, including 29.5% of those under age 18 and 8.4% of those age 65 or over. Of the population age 25 and over, 89.8% were high school graduates or higher and 24.5% had a bachelor's degree or higher.

== Notable members ==
- Ah-moose (d. 1866), chief
- Thomas St. Germaine (1885–1947), American football player
