= Treaty of La Pointe =

1842 and 1854 treaties between the United States and Ojibwe

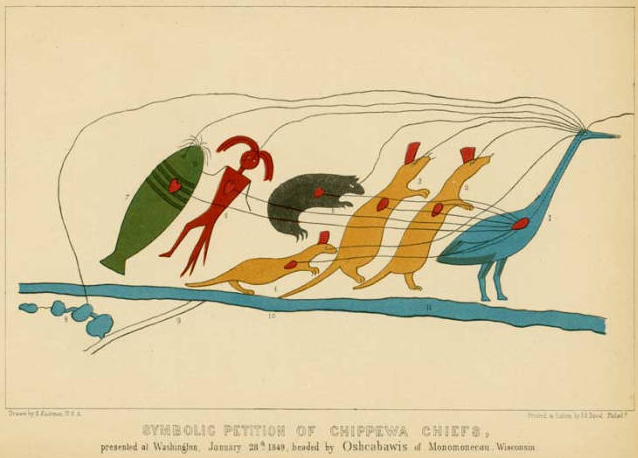
Symbolic 1849 petition attributed to Chief Buffalo protesting the violation of the 1842 Treaty of La Pointe

The Treaty of La Pointe may refer to either of two treaties made and signed in La Pointe, Wisconsin between the United States and the Ojibwe (Chippewa) Native American peoples. In addition, the Isle Royale Agreement, an adhesion to the first Treaty of La Pointe, was made at La Pointe.

== 1842 Treaty of La Pointe ==
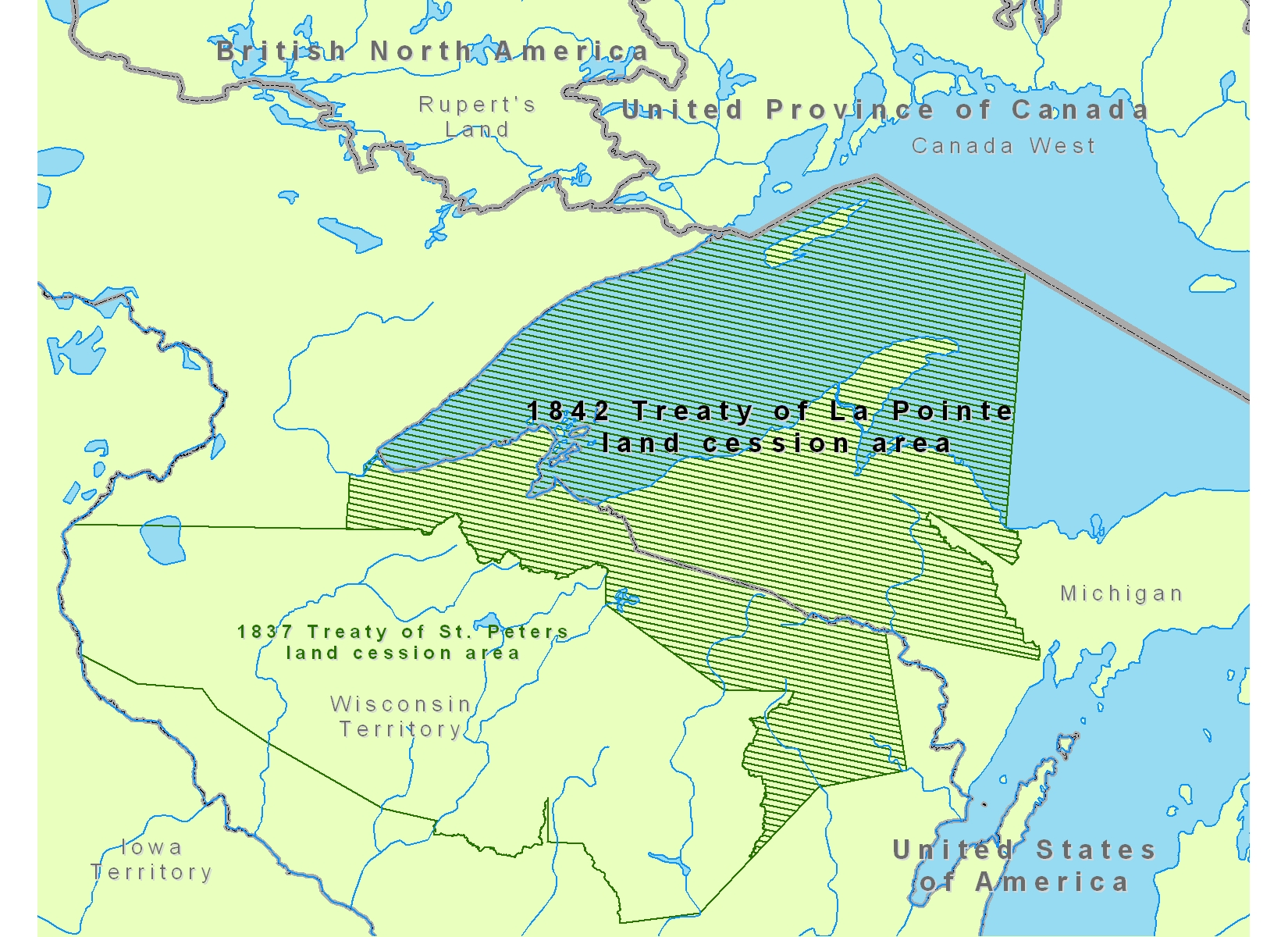
Map showing the 1842 Treaty of La Pointe land cession area of what now is Minnesota's portion of Lake Superior, Wisconsin and Michigan

The first treaty of La Pointe was signed by Robert Stuart for the United States and representatives of the Ojibwe Bands of Lake Superior and the Mississippi River on October 4, 1842 and proclaimed on March 23, 1843, encoded into the laws of the United States as 7 Stat. 591. By this treaty, the Ojibwa ceded extensive tracts of land that are now parts of the states of Wisconsin and Michigan, specifically the latter's Upper Peninsula.

The Webster-Ashburton Treaty was signed on August 9, 1842, between Great Britain and the United States, officially ending their boundary dispute on what now is the Arrowhead Region of Minnesota, as well as settling other claims. This news did not reach the United States parties to the La Pointe Treaty negotiation. Consequently, the Grand Portage Band, then considered to be in Canadian British territory, was not invited to join the signing of this treaty. It is now considered to occupy territory in the United States.

In 1844, the United States and Grand Portage Band signed the Isle Royale Agreement as an adhesion to this treaty.

As determined subsequently by the United States Supreme Court, the signatory tribes retain hunting, fishing and gathering rights on their former lands in this region. In addition, the Supreme Court held that the treaty obligated the United States to provide reservations for peoples of the signatory bands. For instance, it acquired land in the 1930s for the Bay Mills Indian Community, whose people had historically long been located on Lake Superior in Michigan.

=== Signatories ===
The Ojibwe treaty signatories were:

#	Location	Recorded name	Name (translation/"alias")	Title
1	Crow Wing River	Po go ne gi shik	Bagonegiizhig (Hole in the Day)	1st chief
2	Crow Wing River	Son go com ick	Zoongakamig (Firm Ground)	2d chief
3	Sandy Lake Band	Ka non do ur uin zo	Gaa-nandawaawinzo (He that Gathers Berries/"le Brocheux")	1st chief
4	Sandy Lake Band	Na tum e gaw bon	Netamigaabaw (Stands First)	2d chief
5	Gull Lake	Ua bo jig	Waabojiig (White Fisher)	1st chief
6	Gull Lake	Pay pe si gon de bay	Bebiizigindibe (Curly Head)	2d chief
7	Red Ceder Lake	Kui ui sen shis	Gwiiwizhenzhish (Bad Boy)	1st chief
8	Red Ceder Lake	Ott taw wance	Odaawaans (Little Ottawa)	2d chief
9	Pokegama	Bai ie jig	Bayezhig (Lone Man)	1st chief
10	Pokegama	Show ne aw	Zhooniyaa (Silver)	2d chief
11	Wisconsin River	Ki uen zi	Akiwenzii (Old Man)	1st chief
12	Wisconsin River	Wi aw bis ke kut te way	Wayaabishkigoodewe (Has a White Skirt)	2d chief
13	Lac du Flambeau Band	A pish ka go gi	Apishkaagaagi (Magpie/"White Crow")	1st chief
14	Lac du Flambeau Band	May tock cus e quay	Metaakozige ([Smokes] Pure Tobacco)	2d chief
15	Lac du Flambeau Band	She maw gon e	Zhimaagani (Lance)	2d chief
16	Lake Bands	Ki ji ua be she shi	Gichi-waabizheshi (Big Marten)	1st chief
17	Lake Bands	Ke kon o tum	Geganoodam (Intercessor)	2d chief
18	Fond du Lac Band	Shin goob	Zhingob (Balsam)	1st chief
19	Fond du Lac Band	Na gan nab	Naagaanab (Foremost Sitter)	2d chief
20	Fond du Lac Band	Mong o zet	Maangozid (Loon's Foot)	2d chief
21	La Pointe Band	Gitchi waisky	Gichi-weshkiinh (Great-renewer/"Buffalo")	1st chief
22	La Pointe Band	Mi zi	Mizay (Eel)	2d chief
23	La Pointe Band	Ta qua gone e	Dagwagaane (Two Lodges Meet)	2d chief
24	Ontonagon	O kon di kan	Okandikan (Bouy)	1st chief
25	Ontonagon	Kis ke taw wac	Giishkitawag (Cut Ear)	2d chief
26	L'Anse	Pe na shi	Bineshiinh (Bird)	1st chief
27	L'Anse	Guck we san sish	Akakwijenzhish (Bad Little Groundhog)	2d chief
28	Lac Vieux Desert Band	Ka she osh e	Gezhiiyaashi (Sails Fast)	1st chief
29	Lac Vieux Desert Band	Medge waw gwaw wot	Bimijiwaagaakwad (Oblique-edged Ax)	2d chief
30	Mille Lacs Indians	Ne qua ne be	Negwanebi ([Quill]feather)	1st chief
31	Mille Lacs Indians	Ua shash ko kum	Wazhashkokon (Muskrat's Liver)	2d chief
32	Mille Lacs Indians	No din	Noodin (Wind)	2d chief
33	St. Croix Band	Be zhi ki	Bizhiki (Buffalo)	1st chief
34	St. Croix Band	Ka bi na be	Gaa-biimabi (He that sits to the side/"Wet mouth")	2d chief
35	St. Croix Band	Ai aw bens	Ayaabens (Little Buck)	2d chief
36	Snake River	Sha go bi	Zhaagobe (Six)	1st chief
37	Chippewa River	Ua be she shi	Waabizheshi (Marten)	1st chief
38	Chippewa River	Que way zhan sis	Gwiiwizhenzhish (Bad Boy)	2d chief
39	Lac Courte Oreilles Band	Ne na nang eb	Nenaa'angebi (Beautifying Bird)	1st chief
40	Lac Courte Oreilles Band	Be bo kon uen		2d chief
41	Lac Courte Oreilles Band	Ki uen zi	Akiwenzii (Old Man)	2d chief

^{‡}Name given in Dakota.

=== Treaty area boundary adjustments ===
In Michigan, no boundary adjustments have been made.

In Wisconsin, for regulatory purposes, the southeastern boundaries of the 1842 treaty-area have been adjusted to follow distinct landmarks such as roads and streams. Furthermore, in Wisconsin, with consent of the property-owner and with tribally issued license, all treaty rights of hunting, fishing and gathering may be exercised by the members of the signatory bands.

In Minnesota, no boundary adjustments have been made. The Minnesota Department of Natural Resources have been mainly concerned over hunting regulations as related to this treaty. Minnesota does not acknowledge the 1842 land cession area as giving the tribes privilege over Minnesota's own claim over Lake Superior. Minnesota Department of Natural Resources approved an extension of the 1854 Treaty of La Pointe tribal fishing rights for the Grand Portage Band over a portion of the state's Lake Superior claims.

== 1844 Isle Royale Agreement ==
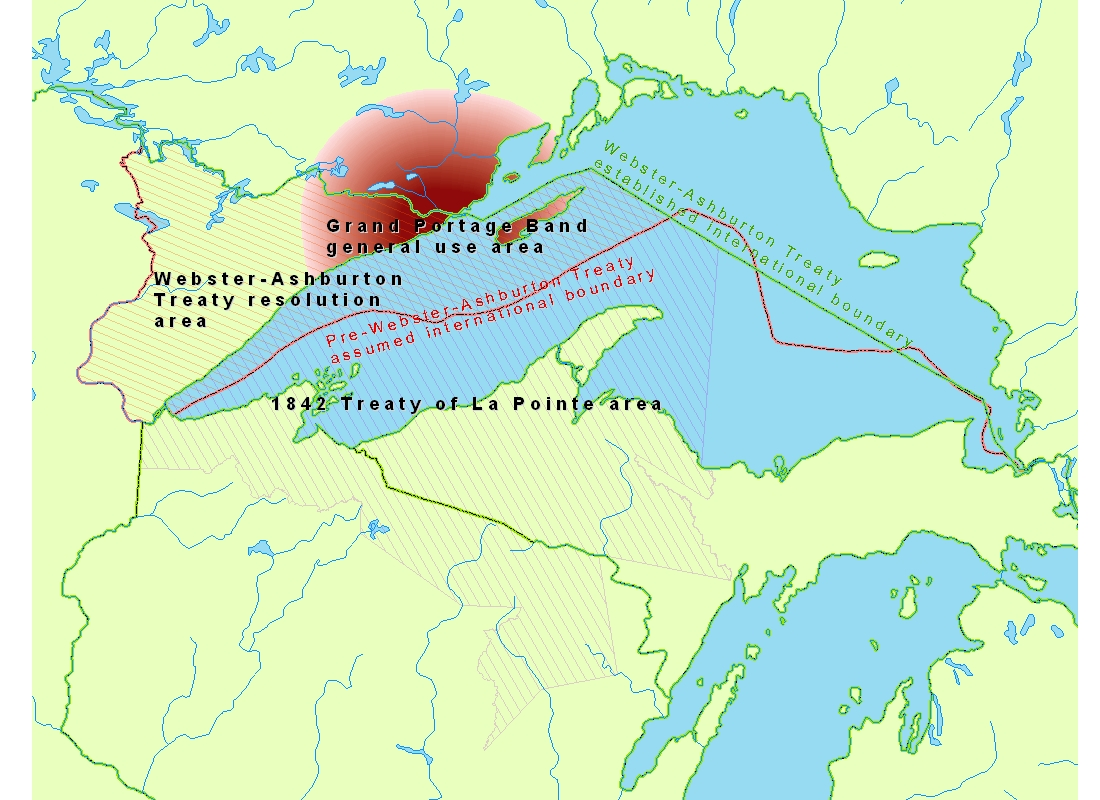
Map showing the 1844 Webster-Ashburton Treaty area of what now is Minnesota, the 1842 Treaty of La Pointe area, and their overlap over Isle Royale, which precipitated the need for the Isle Royale Agreement

The Isle Royale Agreement is an adhesion to the 1842 Treaty of La Pointe, conducted at La Pointe, Wisconsin Territory on August 20, 1844. Commissioner Robert Stuart again represented the United States. The Grand Portage Band was using the resources on Isle Royale and believed it and they were in British territory. After boundary clarification was settled via the Webster Ashburton Treaty of 1842, the Grand Portage Band signed the Isle Royale Agreement with the United States as a treaty adhesion. The 1842 treaty signatories re-affirmed their treaty.

=== Signatories ===
#	Recorded name	Name (translation/"alias")	Location
01	Wab-ish-gag-gang-e	Waabishkaagaagi (White Crow)	Lac du Flambeau Band
02	She-mang-un-ish	Zhimaaganish (Lance)	Lac du Flambeau Band
03	Knisteno	Ginishtinoo (Cree)	Lac du Flambeau Band
04	Ude-kum-ag	Adikameg (Whitefish)	Lac du Flambeau Band
05	Now-uj-e-wun	Naawajiwan (Middle of the Current)	Lac du Flambeau Band
06	Medge-wok-gok-wud	Bimijiwaagaakwad (Oblique-edged Ax)	Lac du Flambeau Band
07	Ah-mon-se	Aamoons (Wasp)	Lac du Flambeau Band
08	San-gan-e-may		Lac du Flambeau Band
09	Ke-che-wais-keenh	Gichi-weshkiinh (Great-renewer/"le Bœuf")	La Pointe Band
10	Tug-wug-aun-e	Dagwagaane (Two Lodges Meet)	La Pointe Band
11	Mis-ia	Mizay (Eel)	La Pointe Band
12	Muk-ud-a-be-nase	Makade-bines (Black Bird)	La Pointe Band
13	Ke-che-waub-e-sash-e	Gichi-waabizheshi (Big Marten)	Pelican Lake
14	Nig-gig	Nigig (Otter)	Pelican Lake
15	Osh-kau-bay-wis	Oshkaabewis (Waiter)	Wisconsin River
16	Kay-she-aush	Gezhiiyaashi (Sails Fast)	Lac Vieux Desert Band
17	Rim-idj-wang-auk-wad	Bimijiwaagaakwad (Oblique-edged Ax)	Lac Vieux Desert Band
18	Bin-ash-een	Bineshiinh (Bird)	L'Anse
19	Ke-nen-ance		L'Anse
20	Bug-um-aug-un	Bagamaagan (War-club)	L'Anse
21	Shin-goop	Zhingob (Spruce)	Fond du Lac Band
22	Nug-un-ub	Naagaanab (Foremost Sitter)	Fond du Lac Band
23	Mon-go-sit	Maangozid (Loon's Foot)	Fond du Lac Band
24	Kah-rum-dum-ah-winso	Gaa-nandawaawinzo (He that Gathers Berries/"le Brocheux")	Sandy Lake Band
25	Win-je-ke-shik-uk	Wenji-giizhigak (Whence from the Sky)	Sandy Lake Band
26	Bug-on-a-ke-shing	Bagonegiizhig (Hole in the Day)	Crow Wing
27	Song-uk-um-ig	Zoongakamig (Firm Ground)	Crow Wing
28	I-ansh-ow-eke-shik	Aayaazhawi-giizhig (Crossing Sky)	Red Cedar Lake
29	Otto-wance	Odaawaans (Little Ottawa)	Red Cedar Lake
30	Waub-o-geeg	Waabojiig (White Fisher)	Gull Lake
31	Na-quon-abe	Negwanebi (["Tallest" Quill]feather)	Mille Lacs Band
32	Be-dud	Pítad^{‡} (Muskrat's Liver)	Mille Lacs Band
33	No-din	Noodin (Wind)	Mille Lacs Band
34	Shin-e-yah	Zhooniyaa (Silver)	Pokegama
35	Boin-ance	Bwaanens (Little Sioux)	Pokegama
36	Kow-e-tas-sy		St. Croix Band
37	Ah-cab-ay	Ayaabe[ns] ([Little] Buck)	St. Croix Band
38	Ke-che-no-din	Gichi-noodin (Big Wing)	St. Croix Band
39	Gah-be-mah-be	Gaa-biimabi (He that sits to the side/"Wet Mouth")	St. Croix Band
40	Waub-e-sash-e	Waabizheshi (Marten)	Chippewa River
41	Que-we-san-sish	Gwiiwizhenzhish (Bad Boy)	Chippewa River
42	Mah-een-gun	Ma'iingan (Wolf)	Chippewa River
43	Ke-wan-se	Akiwenzii (Old Man)	Lac Courte Oreilles Band
44	Ke-che-be-nas-sy	Gichi-binesi (Big Bird)	Lac Courte Oreilles Band
45	Omad-ag-um-e	Omadaagamii (Choppy Waters)	Lake Chetac
46	Nay-nuk-aung-abe	Nenaa'angebi (Beautifying Bird)	Lake Chetac
47	Ka-kake	Gegek (Hawk)	Lake Chetac
48	Ky-aush-ke-bar	Gayaashkobaa (Gull-narrows)	Lake Chetac
49	Shag-un-aush-eens	Zhaaganaashiins (Little Englishman)	Grand Portage Band
50	Ad-dik-ons	Adikoons (Little Reindeer)	Grand Portage Band

^{‡} Name given in Dakota

- Wm. McDonald
- Jno. Hulbert
- Clement H Beaulieu
- Chas. H. Oakes
- J Russell
- Jas. P. Hays, United States Indian Sub-Agent
- Wm. W. Warren, Interpreter

== 1854 Treaty of La Pointe ==
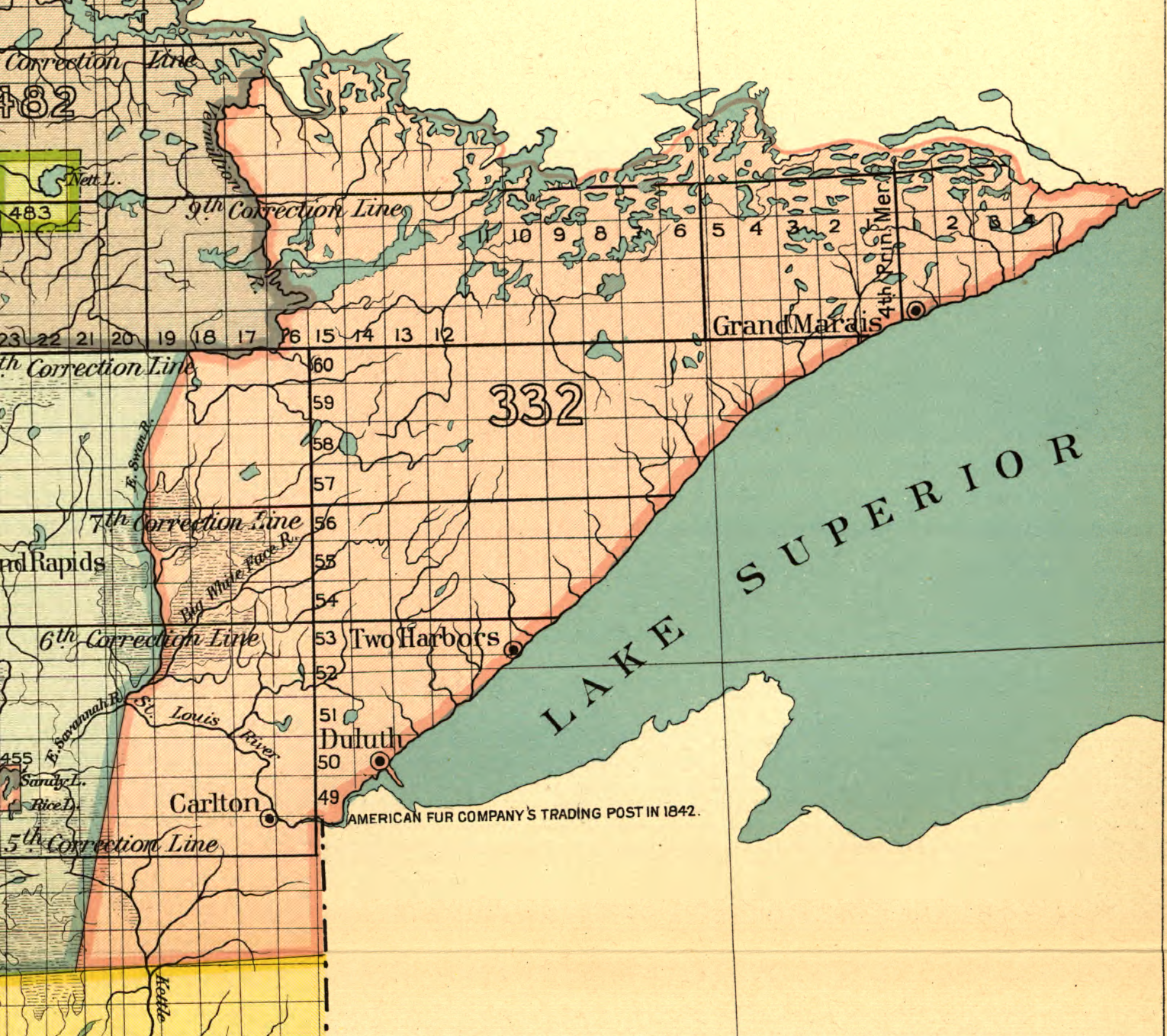
Land ceded in 1854 in the Treaty of La Pointe, designated 332 (pink) on the map

The second treaty of La Pointe was signed by Henry C. Gilbert and David B. Herriman for the United States and representatives of the Ojibwe of Lake Superior and the Mississippi on September 30, 1854, proclaimed on January 29, 1855, and codified as 10 Stat. 1109. The treaty ceded all of the Lake Superior Ojibwe lands to the United States in the Arrowhead Region of Northeastern Minnesota, in exchange for reservations for the Lake Superior Ojibwe in Wisconsin, Michigan, and Minnesota. The signatory tribes retain hunting, fishing and gathering right within this region. The portions left unceded were given claims to the Mississippi Ojibwe. The Indian reservations established under this treaty are:

- L'Anse with Lac Vieux Desert
- Bad River
- Lac du Flambeau and Lac Courte Oreilles
- Fond du Lac
- Grand Portage
- Ontonagon and Red Cliff

along with general land grants to the Metis.

Mole Lake and St. Croix Bands lost their federal recognition due to not being included in this treaty. Mole Lake Band and St. Croix Band's eastern half in Wisconsin re-gained their federal recognition under the Indian Reorganization Act of 1934, but the St. Croix Band's western half in Minnesota are not independently recognized and are considered part of the Mille Lacs Band of Ojibwe.

=== Signatories ===
The Ojibwe treaty signatories were:

#	Location	Recorded name	Name (translation/"alias")	Title
1	La Pointe Band	Ke-che-waish-ke	Gichi-weshkiinh (Great-renewer/"Buffalo")	1st chief
2	La Pointe Band	Chay-che-que-oh	Jechiikwii'o (Snipe)	2d chief
3	La Pointe Band	A-daw-we-ge-zhick	Edawi-giizhig (Each Side of the sky)	2d chief
4	La Pointe Band	O-ske-naw-way	Oshkinawe (Youth)	2d chief
5	La Pointe Band	Maw-caw-day-pe-nay-se	Makade-binesi (Black Bird)	2d chief
6	La Pointe Band	Naw-waw-naw-quot	Naawaanakwad (Middle of the Cloud)	headman
7	La Pointe Band	Ke-wain-zeence	Akiwenziins (Old Man)	headman
8	La Pointe Band	Waw-baw-ne-me-ke	Waabanimikii (White Thunderer)	2d chief
9	La Pointe Band	Pay-baw-me-say	Bebaamise (Soarer)	2d chief
10	La Pointe Band	Naw-waw-ge-waw-nose	Naawajiwanose (Walks through the Middle of the Current)	2d chief
11	La Pointe Band	Maw-caw-day-waw-quot	Makade-anaakwad (Black Cloud)	2d chief
12	La Pointe Band	Me-she-naw-way	Mizhinawe (Disciple)	2d chief
13	La Pointe Band	Key-me-waw-naw-um	Gimiwana'am (Canoes in the Rain)	headman
14	La Pointe Band	She-gog	Zhigaag (Skunk)	headman
15	Ontonagon Band	O-cun-de-cun	Okandikan (Buoy)	1st chief
16	Ontonagon Band	Waw-say-ge-zhick	Waase-giizhig (Clear Sky)	2d chief
17	Ontonagon Band	Keesh-ke-taw-wug	Giishkitawag (Cut Ear)	headman
18	L'Anse Band		David King	1st chief
19	L'Anse Band		John Southwind	headman
20	L'Anse Band		Peter Marksman	headman
21	L'Anse Band	Naw-taw-me-ge-zhick	Netamigiizhig (First Sky)	2d chief
22	L'Anse Band	Aw-se-neece	Asiniins (Little Rock)	headman
23	Lac Vieux Desert Band	May-dway-aw-she	Medweyaashi (Sound by the Wind)	1st chief
24	Lac Vieux Desert Band	Posh-quay-gin	Bashkwegin (Leather)	2d chief
25	Grand Portage Band	Shaw-gaw-naw-sheence	Zhaaganaashiins (Little Englishman)	1st chief
26	Grand Portage Band	May-mosh-caw-wosh	Memashkawaash (Strong Wind)	headman
27	Grand Portage Band	Aw-de-konse	Adikoons (Little Reindeer)	2d chief
28	Grand Portage Band	Way-we-ge-wam		headman
29	Fond du Lac Band	Shing-goope	Zhingob (Balsam)	1st chief
30	Fond du Lac Band	Mawn-go-sit	Maangozid (Loon's Foot)	2d chief
31	Fond du Lac Band	May-quaw-me-we-ge-zhick	Mekwamiiwi-giizhig (Icy Day)	headman
32	Fond du Lac Band	Keesh-kawk		headman
33	Fond du Lac Band	Caw-taw-waw-be-day	Gaa-dawaabide (Cracked Tooth/"Broken Tooth")	headman
34	Fond du Lac Band	O-saw-gee	Ozaagii (Sauk)	headman
35	Fond du Lac Band	Ke-che-aw-ke-wain-ze	Gichi-akiwenzii (Big Old Man)	headman
36	Fond du Lac Band	Naw-gaw-nub	Naagaanab (Foremost Sitter)	2d chief
37	Fond du Lac Band	Ain-ne-maw-sung	Enimaasing (Sails Away)	2d chief
38	Fond du Lac Band	Naw-aw-bun-way		headman
39	Fond du Lac Band	Wain-ge-maw-tub	Wenji-maadab (Where He Moves From Sitting)	headman
40	Fond du Lac Band	Aw-ke-wain-zeence	Akiwenziins (Little Old Man)	headman
41	Fond du Lac Band	Shay-way-be-nay-se	Azhewe-binesi (Ingressive Bird)	headman
42	Fond du Lac Band	Paw-pe-oh	Baabii'o (Awaits)	headman
43	Lac Courte Oreilles Band	Aw-ke-wain-ze	Akiwenzii (Old Man)	1st chief
44	Lac Courte Oreilles Band	Key-no-zhance	Ginoozhens (Little Jack Fish)	1st chief
45	Lac Courte Oreilles Band	Key-che-pe-nay-se	Gichi-binesi (Big Bird)	2d chief
46	Lac Courte Oreilles Band	Ke-che-waw-be-shay-she	Gichi-waabizheshi (Big Marten)	2d chief
47	Lac Courte Oreilles Band	Waw-be-shay-sheence	Waabizheshiins (Little Marten)	headman
48	Lac Courte Oreilles Band	Quay-quay-cub	Gwekwekab (Turns Around Sitting)	headman
49	Lac Courte Oreilles Band	Shaw-waw-no-me-tay	Zhaawano-mide (Southern Medicine)	headman
50	Lac Courte Oreilles Band	Nay-naw-ong-gay-be	Nenaa'angebi (Dressing Bird)	1st chief
51	Lac Courte Oreilles Band	O-zhaw-waw-sco-ge-zhick	Ozhaawashko-giizhig (Blue Sky)	2d chief
52	Lac Courte Oreilles Band	I-yaw-banse	Ayaabens (Little Buck)	2d chief
53	Lac Courte Oreilles Band	Ke-che-e-nin-ne	Gichi-inini (Big Man)	headman
54	Lac Courte Oreilles Band	Haw-daw-gaw-me	Naadagaame (Paddle to Shore)	headman
55	Lac Courte Oreilles Band	Way-me-te-go-she	Wemitigoozhi (Frenchman)	headman
56	Lac Courte Oreilles Band	Pay-me-ge-wung	Bemijiwang (Swift Current)	headman
57	Lac du Flambeau Band	Aw-mo-se	Aamoons (Wasp)	1st chief
58	Lac du Flambeau Band	Ke-nish-te-no	Ginishtinoo (Cree)	2d chief
59	Lac du Flambeau Band	Me-gee-see	Migizi (Eagle)	2d chief
60	Lac du Flambeau Band	Kay-kay-co-gwaw-nay-aw-she	Gekekogwaneyaashi (Blown Hawk-feather)	headman
61	Lac du Flambeau Band	O-che-chog	Ojichaag (Soul)	headman
62	Lac du Flambeau Band	Nay-she-kay-gwaw-nay-be	Nezhikegwanebi (Lone Wing-feather)	headman
63	Lac du Flambeau Band	O-scaw-bay-wis	Oshkaabewis (Waiter)	1st chief
64	Lac du Flambeau Band	Que-we-zance	Gwiiwizens (White Fish)	2d chief
65	Lac du Flambeau Band	Ne-gig	Nigig (Otter)	2d chief
66	Lac du Flambeau Band	Nay-waw-che-ge-ghick-may-be	Newajii-giizhigwebi (Sits on the Sky-break)	headman
67	Lac du Flambeau Band	Quay-quay-ke-cah	Gwekwekikaa (Keeps Turning)	headman
68	Bois Forte Band	Kay-baish-caw-daw-way	(Clear Round the Prairie)	1st chief
69	Bois Forte Band	Way-zaw-we-ge-zhick-way-sking	Wezaawi-giizhigweshking (Sky-Yellower)	headman
70	Bois Forte Band	O-saw-we-pe-nay-she	Ozaawi-bineshiinh (Yellow Bird)	headman
71	Mississippi Bands	Que-we-san-se	Gwiiwizensi (Boy/"Hole in the Day")	head chief
72	Mississippi Bands	Caw-nawn-daw-waw-win-zo	Gaa-nandawaawinzo (Ripe-Berry Hunter)	1st chief
73	Mississippi Bands	Waw-bow-jieg	Waabojiig (White Fisher)	2d chief
74	Mississippi Bands	Ot-taw-waw	Odaawaa (Ottawa)	2d chief
75	Mississippi Bands	Que-we-zhan-cis	Gwiiwizhenzhish (Bad Boy)	2d chief
76	Mississippi Bands	Bye-a-jick	Bayezhig (Lone Man)	2d chief
77	Mississippi Bands	I-yaw-shaw-way-ge-zhick	Aayaazhawi-giizhig (Crossing Sky)	2d chief
78	Mississippi Bands	Maw-caw-day	Makode' (Bear's Heart)	2d chief
79	Mississippi Bands	Ke-way-de-no-go-nay-be	Giiwedinogwanebi (Northern Feather)	2d chief
80	Mississippi Bands	Me-squaw-dace	Miskwaadesi (Painted Turtle)	headman
81	Mississippi Bands	Naw-gaw-ne-gaw-bo	Naagaanigaabaw (Standing Ahead)	headman
82	Mississippi Bands	Wawm-be-de-yea		headman
83	Mississippi Bands	Waish-key	Weshki (New One)	headman
84	Mississippi Bands	Caw-way-caw-me-ge-skung	Gaawekamigishkaang (Return Through the Ground)	headman
85	Mississippi Bands	My-yaw-ge-way-we-dun	Mayaajiiwewidang (One who carries the Voice)	2d chief
