= Lac Vieux Desert =

Lake in the state of Michigan, United States

- Location within Michigan
- Location: Gogebic County, Michigan / Vilas County, Wisconsin, United States
- Coordinates: 46.13°N 89.12°W
- Primary outflows: Wisconsin River
- Basin countries: United States
- Max. length: 4 miles (6.4 km)
- Max. width: 2 miles (3.2 km)
- Surface area: 4,260 acres (17.2 km^{2})
- Max. depth: 40 ft (12 m)
- Surface elevation: 1,683 ft (513 m)
- Islands: Draper Island, Duck Island

Lac Vieux Desert is a lake in the United States divided between Gogebic County, Michigan, and Vilas County, Wisconsin. Fed primarily by springs in the surrounding swamps, it is the source of the Wisconsin River, which flows out of its southwest corner. The lake contains a number of small islands, especially in its northeastern lobe, including Draper Island, in Michigan, and Duck Island, in Wisconsin, referred to as Middle Island and South Island in the Wisconsin and Michigan State Constitutions.

Lac Vieux Desert has a surface elevation 1,680 ft (510 m) above sea level, and a maximum depth of about 40 ft (12 m). The surface area is 4,260 acres (17.24 km^{2}; 6.66 sq mi), of which approximately two-thirds is in Wisconsin and one third in Michigan.

Located in the Lake District of northern Wisconsin, the lake is a popular boating and fishing resort.

The lake was named by French fur trappers, who were some of the first Europeans in the region. They translated the name into French from the term used by the Ojibwe of the area: Gete-gitigaani-zaaga'igan, meaning "Lake of the Old Clearing", or "Old Garden." At the time of European colonization, the Ojibwe (also known in the US as Chippewa) occupied extensive territory around Lake Superior, in what are now the jurisdictions of northern Michigan, Wisconsin and Minnesota in the United States, and northern Ontario through southeastern Manitoba in Canada.

The Michigan shore of Lac Vieux Desert is in the largest of the few small areas of Michigan that are part of the drainage or watershed of the Mississippi River. There are three such areas along the Wisconsin border with Gogebic County and a bit of Iron County in the Upper Peninsula of Michigan, and two areas along the Indiana border with Berrien County in southern Michigan.

== Recreation ==
There are multiple resorts and campgrounds on the lake. Most of the shoreline on the Wisconsin side of the lake is developed, however dense forest surrounds many of the properties.

=== Fishing ===
On July 16, 1919, a tiger muskellunge claimed by both Wisconsin and Michigan as a state record and by the International Game Fish Association as the all-tackle world record was caught in Lac Vieux Desert. It was 54.0 inches (137 cm) long and weighed 23.21 kilograms (51 lb 3 oz). The record has stood longer than any other fishing record in either state.

=== Local activities and attractions ===
- Lac Vieux Desert Indian Reservation, owns and operates a gaming casino
- Paulding Light
- Bond Falls
- Agate Falls Scenic Site

== See also ==
- Lac Vieux Desert Band of Lake Superior Chippewa
- Lac Vieux Desert Indian Reservation
- List of lakes of Michigan
- List of lakes of Wisconsin
