= Lac Vieux Desert Band of Lake Superior Chippewa =

Gete-gitigaaning (Ojibwe)

Regions with significant populations
- Michigan

Languages
- English, Ojibwe

Religion
- Christianity, traditional tribal religion

Related ethnic groups
- Ojibwa bands, Odawa, Potawatomi

Lac Vieux Desert Band of Lake Superior Chippewa (or the Gete-gitigaaning in the Anishinaabe language) is a federally recognized band of the Lake Superior Chippewa, many of whom reside on the Lac Vieux Desert Indian Reservation, located near Watersmeet, Michigan. It is approximately 45 miles southeast of Ironwood, Michigan in Gogebic County.

== Early history ==
As the Ojibwe Nation divided into two and expanded westward from the Sault Ste. Marie region, the southern branch of Ojibwe came to the area now known as Lac Vieux Desert. The Lake Superior Band of Chippewa included twelve bands in historic times.

This lake, known as Gete-gitigaani-zaaga'igan ("Lake of the old garden") in the Anishinaabe language, is located near several major watershed boundaries. It served as an ideal travel/trade hub connecting major waterways and trails to Lake Superior, Lake Michigan and Wisconsin River. The Lac Vieux Desert Band was one of three in Michigan. The other nine bands of Lake Superior Chippewa resided in what became organized as Wisconsin and Minnesota under the United States rule.

All twelve bands were signatory to several treaties with the United States. Chiefs of the Lac Vieux Desert Band signed the Treaty of St. Peters of 1837, Treaty of La Pointe of 1842, and Treaty of La Pointe of 1854, by which they ceded tribal communal land in Michigan to the United States. The second La Pointe Treaty of 1854, added to include a band newly included in US territory because of international boundary changes, also established the Lac Vieux Desert Indian Reservation. It is known as Gete-gitigaaning in the Anishinaabe language.

Under the federal Indian Reorganization Act of 1934, which otherwise encouraged tribes to re-established self-government, the Lac Vieux Desert Band lost their independent federal recognition. Together with the formerly independent L'Anse and Ontonogon bands, they were classified as members of the newly named Keweenaw Bay Indian Community. But they continued to reside separately in the Watersmeet area.

== Independent federal recognition ==
Indian activism was on the rise in the 1960s, as tribes organized to assert their rights and sovereignty. Beginning then and for nearly 20 years, the Band worked to regain independent federal recognition as a self-governing group. They had had an independent, historic relationship with the federal government, as documented by their many treaties and their separate reservation. The band finally achieved recognition through a Congressional bill: on September 8, 1988, President Ronald Reagan signed the "Lac Vieux Desert Band of Lake Superior Chippewa Indians Act" (H.R. 3697) that officially recognized the Band as a separate and distinct tribe apart from the Keweenaw Bay Indian Community.

The Lac Vieux Desert Band independently joined the Inter-Tribal Council of Michigan, Inc. in 1988. It was formed in 1966 to represent tribes in Michigan, share management resources, and gain funding through joint programs. As the tribes have grown and developed more of their own programs, the council has transferred functions to them.

== Economic development ==
The tribe owns and operates the Northern Waters Casino Resort on its reservation in Watersmeet, Michigan. The resort includes the Dancing Eagles Hotel and the Lac Vieux Desert golf course. Seasonal events include ice fishing competitions in winter.

The tribe has established an online, short-term installment loans business to serve underbanked Americans. The business has brought new employment opportunities and had generated financial support for other tribal business ventures and social programs for the reservation. The tribe established Big Picture Loans (https://www.bigpictureloans.com) in late 2016, which is based on the reservation in Watersmeet. The loans are available only online and the maximum loan value is $3,500, according to the company website.

In August 2015, the Lac Vieux Desert community opened a state-of-the-art medical complex, Lac Vieux Desert Health Center, which is available to the entire population of the Western Upper Peninsula. The medical complex offers care for the entire family, is open to the public, and accepts all insurance.

In 2015 the tribe was awarded a historic preservation grant from the National Park Service to survey the ancient Lac Vieux Desert to L'Anse Trail, a more than 80-mile path long used by the Ojibwe before the 17th century between this area and L'Anse. The Ojibwe continued to use this trail into the 1940s. As part of the management plan of the Ottawa National Forest, which occupies land near them, the tribe wants to identify and preserve the historically significant trail. It passes through Baraga, Houghton, Iron and Gogebic counties.
