= Benjamin G. Armstrong =

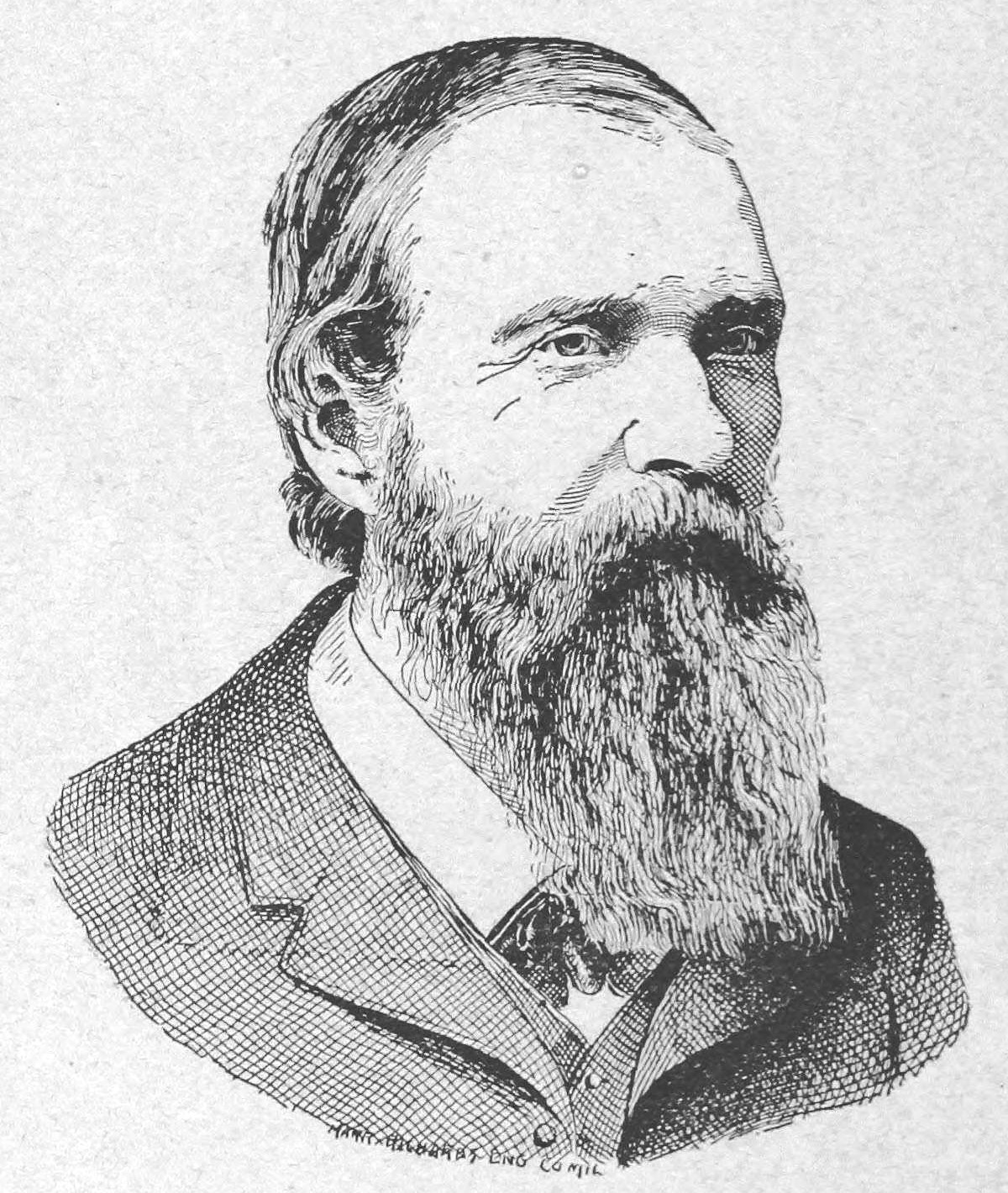
Benjamin G. Armstrong in 1892

Benjamin G. Armstrong (July 4, 1820 – August 1, 1900) was the son-in-law of Kechewaishke also known as Chief Buffalo, the principal chief of the Lake Superior Chippewa (Ojibwa) and a literate white interpreter. He wrote a petition that Buffalo delivered to the President of the United States not to have the Ojibwa removed from their homes. He served as an interpreter and advocate for Native American visitors to the White House and sat before President Fillmore and President Lincoln in this role. To reward him, when he signed the 1854 Treaty of La Pointe a year before he died, Kechewaishke added this provision:

I hereby select a tract of land one mile square, the exact boundary of which may be defined when the surveys are made, lying on the west shore of St. Louis Bay, Minnesota Territory, immediately above and adjoining Minnesota Point, and I direct that patents be issued for the same, according to the above-recited provision, to Shaw-bwaw-skung, or Benjamin Armstrong.

Armstrong's land, known as the Buffalo Tract, comprised part of today's downtown Duluth and sits on the corner of Lake Superior. Part of it, the former Lake Place Park, is now known as Gichi-Ode' Akiing or in Ojibwe, "a grand heart place." Armstrong's ownership survived a U.S. Supreme Court case.

He authored the book Early Life Among the Indians: Reminiscences from the Life of Benj. G. Armstrong in 1892 which documented life in the Lake Superior area in the 1800s and was cited in federal court in a ground-breaking decision on tribal rights and treaty protections.

He died on August 1, 1900.
