= Watersmeet, Michigan =

- Census-designated place (CDP) & unincorporated community
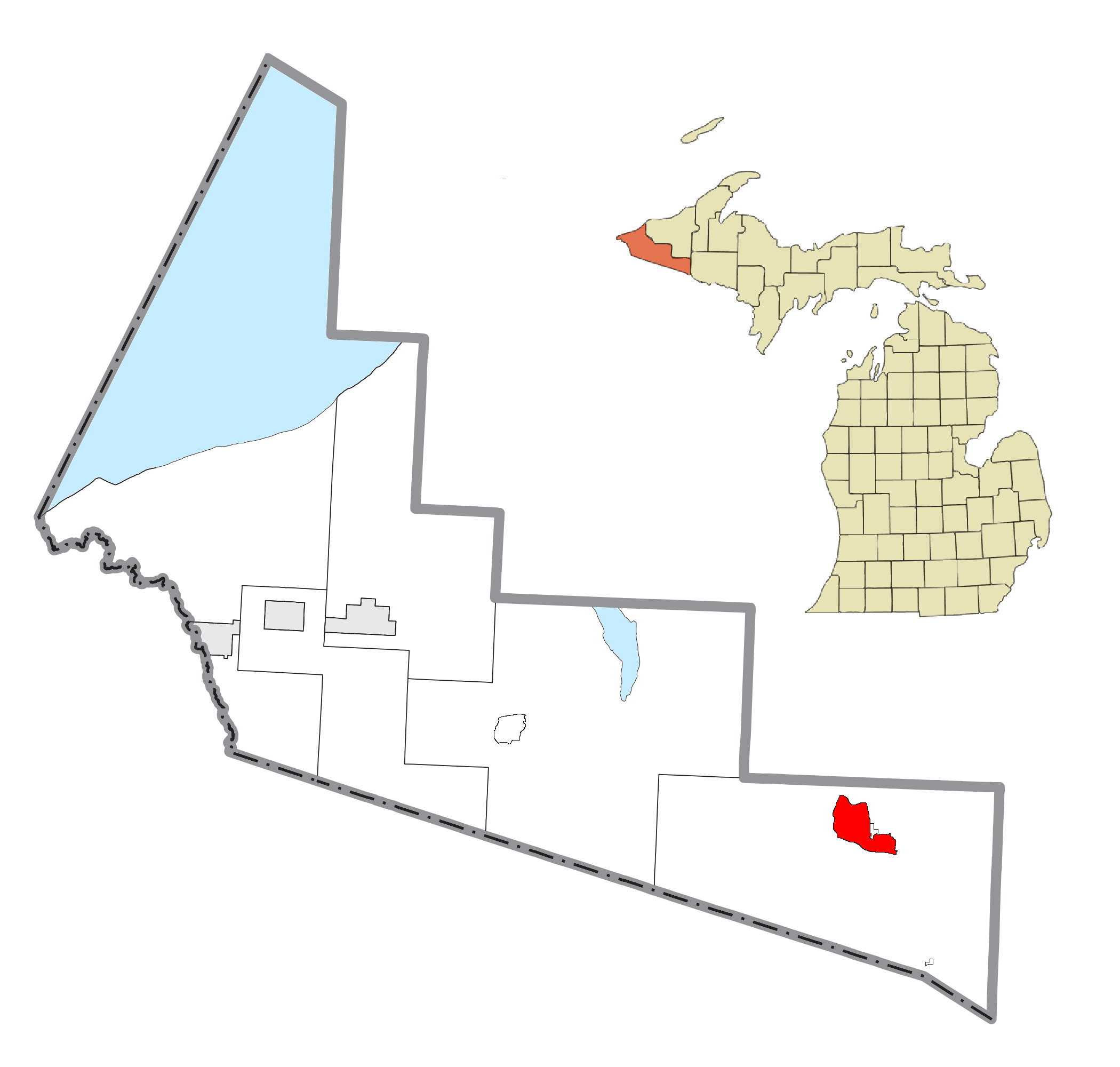
- Location within Gogebic County

- Location within the state of Michigan Watersmeet (the United States)
- Coordinates: 46°16′04″N 89°10′41″W
- Country: United States
- State: Michigan
- County: Gogebic
- Township: Watersmeet

Area
  - Total: 9.20 sq mi (23.84 km^{2})
  - Land: 9.20 sq mi (23.83 km^{2})
  - Water: 0.0039 sq mi (0.01 km^{2})
- Elevation: 1,598 ft (487 m)

Population (2020)
  - Total: 408
  - Density: 44.3/sq mi (17.12/km^{2})
- Time zone: UTC-6 (Central (CST))
  - Summer (DST): UTC-5 (CDT)
- ZIP code(s): 49969
- Area code: 906
- FIPS code: 26-84360
- GNIS feature ID: 1622065

Watersmeet is an unincorporated community and census-designated place (CDP) in Watersmeet Township, Michigan. As of the 2020 census, the CDP had a population of 408, out of a total population in the township of 1,456. The community was platted in 1884, designated as a station of the Milwaukee Lake Shore and Western Railroad.

== Geography ==
The community is located in the northern part of Watersmeet Township, in the western part of Michigan's Upper Peninsula, at the confluence of Duck Creek with the Middle Branch of the Ontonagon River. U.S. Routes 2 and 45 cross at the southern edge of town; US 2 leads southeast 30 miles (48 km) to Iron River and northwest 41 miles (66 km) to Wakefield, while US 45 leads north 46 miles (74 km) to Ontonagon on Lake Superior and south 26 miles (42 km) to Eagle River, Wisconsin. The community is also served by the State Line Trail.

The community of Watersmeet was listed as a newly-organized census-designated place for the 2010 census, meaning it now has officially defined boundaries and population statistics for the first time. According to the United States Census Bureau, the Watersmeet CDP has an area of 9.2 square miles (23.8 km^{2}), of which 0.004 square miles (0.01 km^{2}), or 0.05%, is water.

== Demographics ==
Historical population
Census	Pop.	Note	%±
2010	428		—
2020	408		−4.7%
U.S. Decennial Census

== Notable person ==
- Jack Bergman, U.S. representative.
