= Kids 4 Afghan Kids =

US-based non-profit organization

Kids 4 Afghan Kids is a non-profit organization that seeks to provide education and medical aid to Afghanistan children and their families. It was started in 1998 by a group of 6th graders in Northville, Michigan. The program is officially called the 'Multi-Ethnic Afghan Schools and Humanitarian Assistance' and has raised over $100,000 toward their efforts.

== Overview ==
Kids 4 Afghan Kids is a child powered and child driven charity organization. Originally, Kids 4 Afghan Kids was solely helped through the volunteering of students attending Northville Public Schools, but the project has gained more support across the region and has volunteers from many different difference schools. Kids 4 Afghan Kids dedicated its time to raising money in the United States, which all goes to help fund aspects of the Afghan village. In the 17 years it since its founding, Kids 4 Afghan Kids has raised funding to build multiple schools, provide clean drinking water, create gardens filled with vegetable and fruit trees, and the money to hire teachers and medical staff. Kids 4 Afghan Kids raises its funds though direct donations and fundraisers, where Kids 4 Afghan Kids sells homemade baked goods and other snacks.

Village elders gave Kids 4 Afghan Kids some land to start its project. When the project started, several buildings were constructed for persons living in the area. The first school built was originally designed to house 150 students and six teachers were hired. Four hundred sixty five students showed up the first day of school. Currently there are four schools, boys and girls each have a high school and primary school. The project has expanded to include 2400 students. Students have class six days a week with Fridays off. Twenty one teachers work on the project and each has at least 100 students per class. Mathematics, social studies and science are taught in the high schools, similar to many Western schools. Dari and Pashto—the two national languages of Afghanistan—are also important subjects of the curriculum. Additionally, the project houses 110 orphans. The deep well provides safe drinking water, and the fruit and nut trees feed the children and families as well.

Kids 4 Afghan Kids has an account with Global Giving, a website dedicated to helping grass roots non profit organizations as well as larger charities. Kids 4 Afghan Kids only recently joined Global Giving, during the summer of 2015, and has raised approximately $5000 from the online fundraisers so far.

The director of the Kids 4 Afghan Kids program, Khris Nedam, is the teacher behind the project. Nedam taught school and lived in Afghanistan in the early 1990s. For her work, she received a 2007 National Award for Citizen Diplomacy.
