= Jake Moody =

American football player (born 1999)

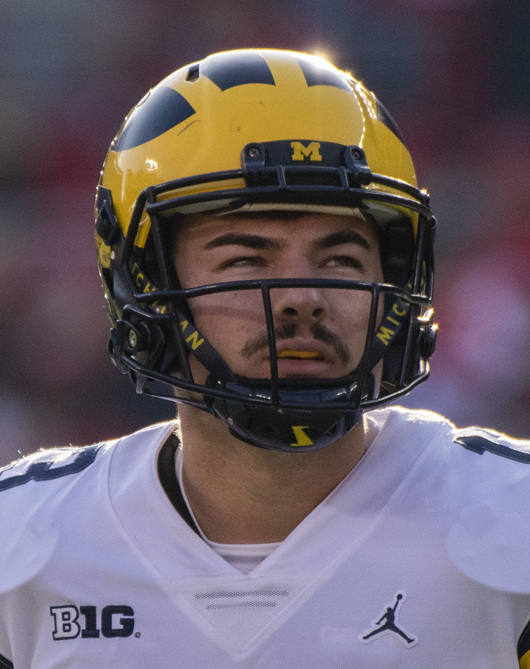
- Moody with the Michigan Wolverines in 2022

No. 39 – Atlanta Falcons
- Position: Kicker
- Roster status: Active

Personal information
- Born: November 23, 1999 (age 26); Commerce, Michigan, U.S.
- Listed height: 6 ft 1 in (1.85 m)
- Listed weight: 210 lb (95 kg)

Career information
- High school: Northville (Northville, Michigan)
- College: Michigan (2018–2022)
- NFL draft: 2023: 3rd round, 99th overall pick

Career history
- San Francisco 49ers (2023–2025); Chicago Bears (2025); Washington Commanders (2025); Baltimore Ravens (2026); Atlanta Falcons (2026–present)

Awards and highlights
- PFWA All-Rookie Team (2023); Lou Groza Award (2021); Consensus All-American (2021); Second-team All-American (2022); 2× Big Ten Kicker of the Year (2021, 2022)

Career NFL statistics as of Week 10, 2026
- Field goals made: 67
- Field goals attempted: 85
- Field goal %: 78.8%
- Total points scored: 310
- Longest field goal: 57
- Touchbacks: 114
- Stats at Pro Football Reference

Jake Moody (born November 23, 1999) is an American professional football placekicker for the Atlanta Falcons of the National Football League (NFL). He played college football for the Michigan Wolverines, where he won the 2021 Lou Groza Award. Moody was selected by the San Francisco 49ers in the third round of the 2023 NFL draft and has also been a member of the Chicago Bears, Washington Commanders, and Baltimore Ravens.

== Early life ==
Moody attended Northville High School in Northville, Michigan, and played football and baseball there.

== College career ==
Moody committed to the University of Michigan in February 2018. He initially committed without a scholarship but was put on scholarship in June 2018. As a true freshman in 2018, Moody set a Wolverines' single-game record with six field goals in a 31–20 victory over Indiana. In April 2020, he set a personal record in practice with a 69-yard field goal.

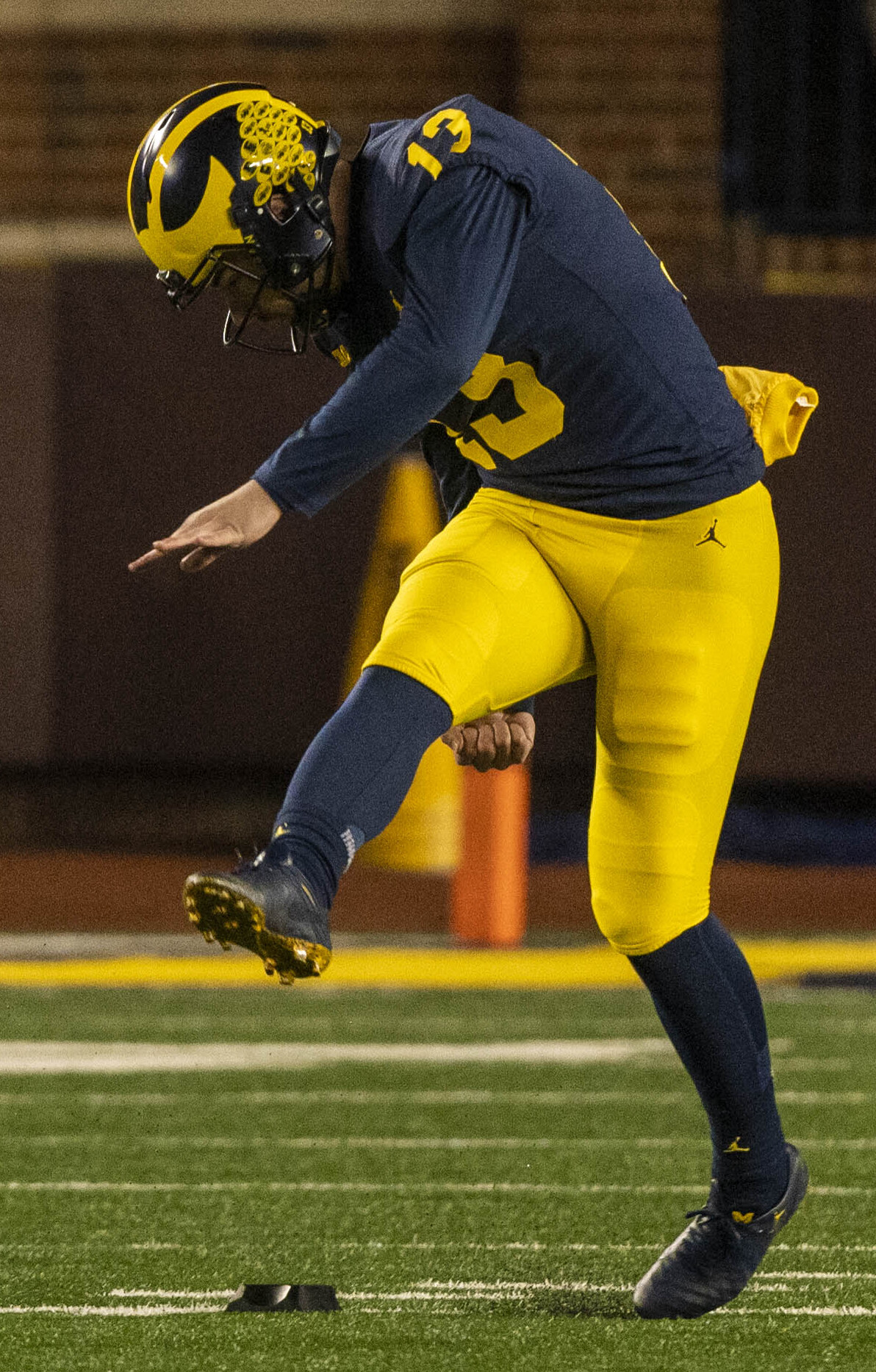
Moody in 2021

As a senior in 2021, Moody successfully converted 22 of 24 field goal attempts and 56 of 56 extra-point kicks. He also kicked a game-winning field goal in the fourth quarter against Nebraska on October 9. Moody's 122 points led the 2021 Michigan Wolverines football team in scoring. He was named the 2021 Bakken–Andersen Big Ten Kicker of the Year and Lou Groza Award winner.

Moody returned for a fifth season in 2022, taking advantage of the extra year of eligibility granted due to the 2020 season being impacted by the COVID-19 pandemic. He went 5-for-5 on field goals, including a career-long 54-yard kick, against Michigan State on October 29, 2022. With four field goals against Illinois on November 19, 2022, including the game-winner with nine seconds left, Moody became the Michigan career field goal leader, with 65, passing Garrett Rivas, and tied Remy Hamilton's single-season mark of 25.

For the 2022 regular season, Moody converted 26-of-32 field goal attempts for an average of 81.25%. He also converted 53 of 53 on extra points. He also led Michigan with 131 points scored. With Moody's field goal in the second quarter during the 2022 Fiesta Bowl, he broke Desmond Howard's single-season scoring record (138 points) set in 1991, and finished with 147 points during the season. Moody finished his career with 355 points, setting a new all-time Michigan scoring record, surpassing the previous record of 354 points set by Garrett Rivas. He also set the program record for longest field goal made at 59-yards, surpassing the previous record of 57-yards held by Quinn Nordin and Hayden Epstein.

== Professional career ==
Pre-draft measurables
Height	Weight	Arm length	Hand span	Wingspan
6 ft 0 5/8 in (1.84 m)	209 lb (95 kg)	30 7/8 in (0.78 m)	9 1/2 in (0.24 m)	6 ft 1 3/4 in (1.87 m)
All values from NFL Combine

=== San Francisco 49ers ===
Moody was selected by the San Francisco 49ers in the third round (99th overall) of the 2023 NFL draft, making him just the second kicker to be selected within the top 100 picks in the last 15 drafts (along with Roberto Aguayo in 2016), and only the fifth kicker since 2000 to be selected in the first three rounds. (Note: The others were Sebastian Janikowski (2000 draft, 1st round), Mike Nugent (2005, 2nd), Roberto Aguayo (2016, 2nd) and Nate Kaeding (2004, 3rd).) Moody and Michigan teammate Brad Robbins became the second punter and kicker tandem to be taken in the same draft in the last 40 years. Moody was the first of three kickers drafted in the 2023 draft, followed by Chad Ryland and Anders Carlson.

==== 2023 season ====
Despite having been injured in the final preseason game, Moody was cleared as the starting kicker for the season-opener against the Pittsburgh Steelers. He finished the 30–7 road victory converting all three field goal attempts and all three extra point attempts. This made Moody the first rookie kicker since Justin Tucker in 2012 to go 3-for-3 or better on extra points and field goal attempts in a season opener. In the next game against the Los Angeles Rams, Moody again made all three field goal attempts and all three extra point attempts during the 30–23 road victory, including a 57-yard field goal, which was the longest successful field goal by a rookie kicker in franchise history.

During a narrow Week 6 19–17 road loss to the Cleveland Browns, Moody had a poor performance as he missed two field goals, including a potential game winning 41-yard field goal as time expired. In the next game against the Minnesota Vikings on Monday Night Football, Moody missed a 40-yard field goal in the second quarter but made a 55-yard field goal in the fourth quarter during the 22–17 road loss. During a Week 15 45–29 road victory over the Arizona Cardinals, he set the longest streak of 53 straight extra points made since the NFL moved the extra point attempt back to the 15-yard-line. However, in the regular-season finale against the Rams, Moody struggled, missing his first extra point attempt along with his lone field goal attempt during the narrow 21–20 loss, marking the first time Moody missed a kick since Week 7.

Moody finished his rookie year converting 21-of-25 field goals and 60-of-61 extra points. He was also named to the PFWA All-Rookie Team. The 49ers finished atop the NFC West with a 12–5 record and earned a first-round bye in the playoffs as the #1-seed. Moody had a field goal blocked in the Divisional Round against the Green Bay Packers and missed a field goal during the NFC Championship Game against the Detroit Lions, but ultimately made a field goal later in both games that proved to be the difference. During Super Bowl LVIII against the Kansas City Chiefs, Moody set the record for longest field goal made in a Super Bowl when he kicked a 55-yard field goal in the second quarter, which also provided the first three points of the game, but the record was broken just one quarter later when opposing kicker Harrison Butker made a 57-yard field goal. Although Moody had an extra point blocked in the fourth quarter, he made a 53-yard field goal to give the 49ers a three-point lead later in the quarter along with a 27-yard field goal in overtime to again give the 49ers the lead before the Chiefs scored a touchdown to win 25–22.

==== 2024 season ====
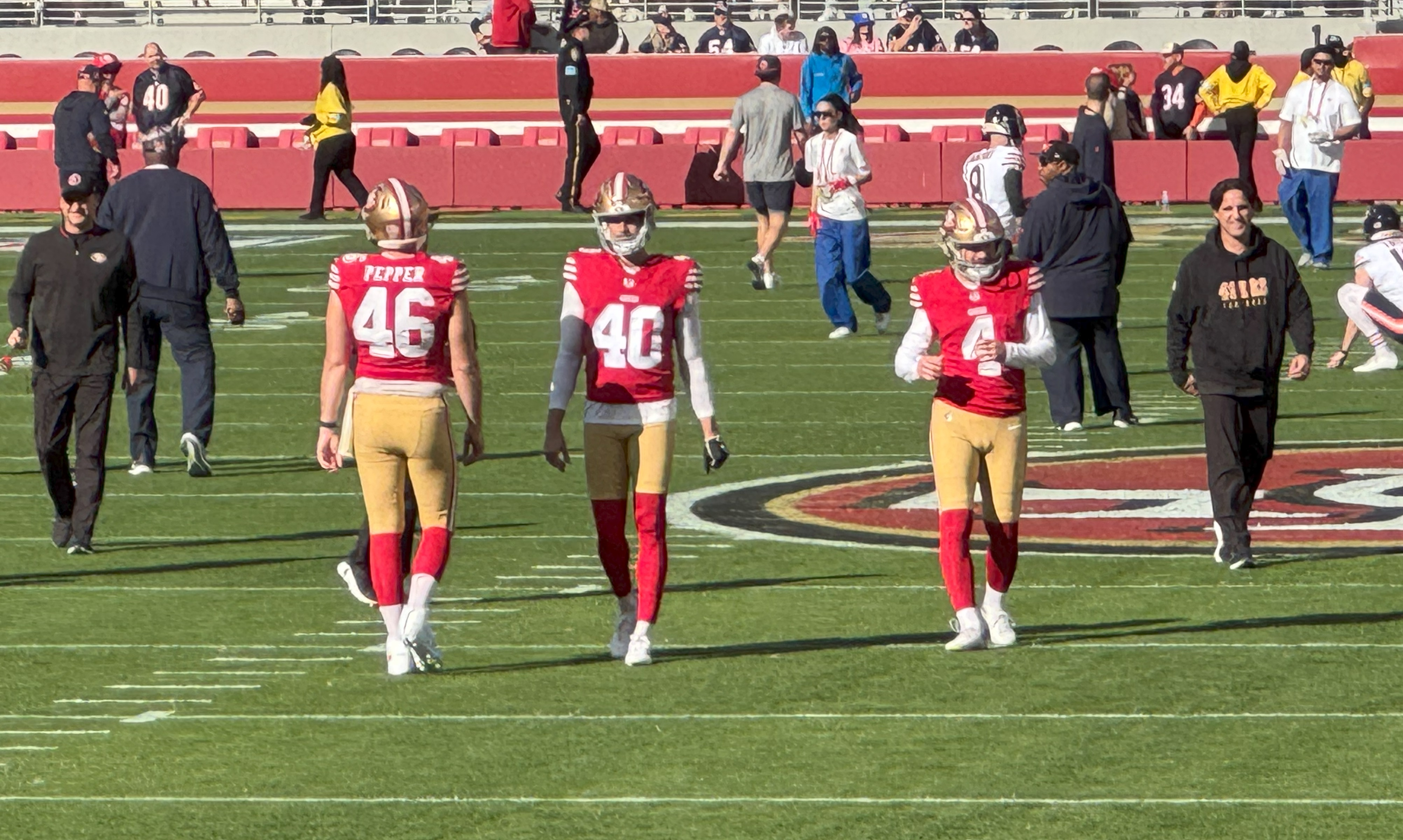
Moody (#4) in 2024

During the season-opener against the New York Jets, Moody converted all six of his field goal attempts and both of his extra point attempts in the 32–19 victory. With his six converted field goals, Moody tied the franchise record for most field goals converted in a single game. He was named NFC Special Teams Player of the Week for his performance. Moody completed his next seven of eight field goals over the next few weeks before missing Weeks 6 and 7 after suffering a high ankle sprain during a narrow Week 5 24–23 loss to the Cardinals.

Moody returned in the Week 10 23–20 road victory over the Tampa Bay Buccaneers, but struggled as he only made three of six field goals, yet made the game-winner. Three weeks later against the Buffalo Bills on Sunday Night Football, Moody struggled as he was 1-for-3 on field goals in the 35–10 road loss.

During Week 15 against the Rams on Thursday Night Football, Moody made both of his field goals, scoring all of San Francisco's points in the 12–6 loss. In the next game against the Miami Dolphins, he made both of his extra points but was 1-of-2 on field goals during the 29–17 road loss. The following week against the Lions on Monday Night Football, Moody missed both of his field goals (51, 58) along with an extra point in the 40–34 loss. During the regular season finale against the Cardinals, he made all three of his extra point attempts but was 1-of-2 on field goals in the 47–24 road loss.

Moody finished his second professional season converting 24-of-34 field goals and 32-of-33 extra points, a significant regression from the previous year.

==== 2025 season ====
During the season-opening 17–13 road victory over the Seattle Seahawks, Moody made both of his extra points but was 1-of-3 on field goals, missing wide left on an attempt from 27 yards and having a 36-yard attempt blocked. As a result, Moody was waived two days later on September 9.

=== Chicago Bears ===
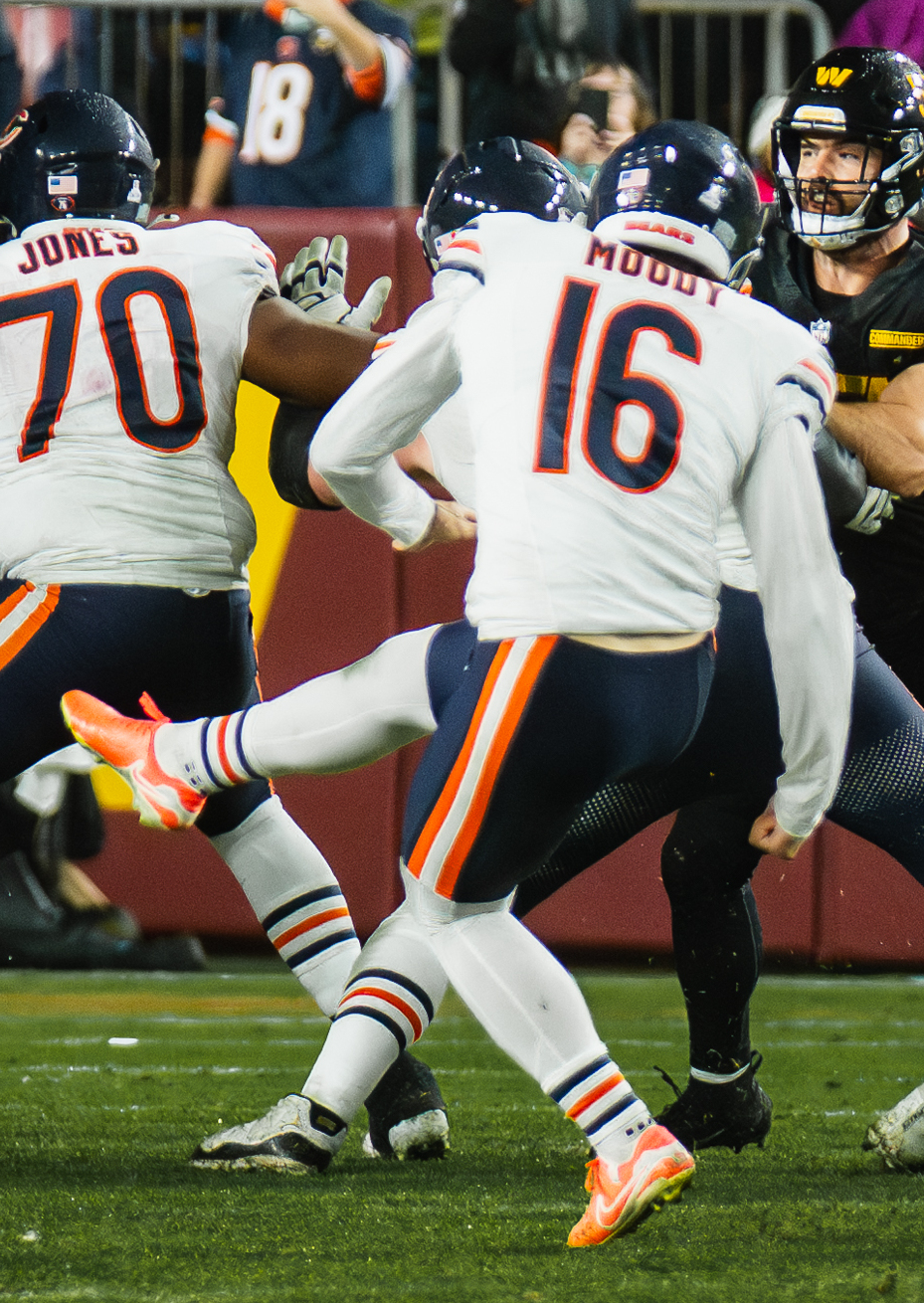
Moody in 2025

On September 12, 2025, Moody signed with the Chicago Bears' practice squad.

On October 13, ahead of the Bears' Week 6 matchup against the Washington Commanders, Moody was activated from the practice squad to replace injured starting kicker Cairo Santos. Moody made four of his five field goal attempts and his lone extra point attempt, with the only miss being a blocked kick. His final attempt came from 38 yards as time expired to secure a narrow 25–24 road victory for the Bears. Moody set a franchise record for the most successful field goals in a debut. During Week 7 against the New Orleans Saints, Moody made all four of his field goal attempts and both of his extra point attempts in the 26–14 victory.

=== Washington Commanders ===
On November 18, 2025, the Washington Commanders signed Moody off the Bears' practice squad. He made his Commanders debut in Week 13 against the Denver Broncos.

On March 12, 2026, Moody re-signed with the Commanders on a one-year $1.5 million contract. He was released on August 18 after undrafted rookie Drew Stevens from the University of Iowa won the starting job.

=== Baltimore Ravens ===
On August 31, 2026, Moody signed with the Baltimore Ravens' practice squad. He was released by Baltimore following the signing of Gage Larvadain on September 15. Moody was re-signed to the practice squad on October 19.

=== Atlanta Falcons ===
On November 10, 2026, Moody was signed by the Atlanta Falcons off the Ravens practice squad, replacing veteran Nick Folk.

== NFL career statistics ==
Legend
	Led the league
**Bold**	Career high

=== Regular season ===
General			Field goals					PATs			Kickoffs			Points
Season	Team	GP	FGM	FGA	FG%	Blck	Long	XPM	XPA	XP%	KO	Avg	TBs	Pts
2023	SF	**17**	21	25	84.0	0	**57**	**60**	**61**	98.4	**90**	**63.1**	**54**	**123**
2024	SF	14	**24**	**34**	70.6	0	53	32	33	97.0	68	62.6	49	104
2025	SF	1	1	3	33.3	**1**	32	2	2	**100.0**	4	62.7	2	5
2025	CHI	2	8	9	88.0	**1**	48	3	3	**100.0**	13	61.5	4	27
2025	WAS	6	10	11	**90.9**	0	56	10	11	90.9	26	58.3	4	40
2026	BAL	1	1	1	100.0	0	53	1	1	100.0	3	65.0	1	4
2026	ATL	1	2	2	100.0	0	37	1	1	100.0	4	50.0	0	7
Career		42	67	85	78.8	2	57	109	112	97.3	208	62.0	114	310

=== Postseason ===
General			Field goals					PATs			Kickoffs			Points
Season	Team	GP	FGM	FGA	FG%	Blck	Long	XPM	XPA	XP%	KO	Avg	TBs	Pts
2023	SF	3	6	8	75.0	1	55	8	9	88.9	18	64.6	16	26
Career		3	6	8	75.0	1	55	8	9	88.9	18	64.6	16	26

== Highlights and awards ==
=== NFL records ===
- Longest field goal converted in a Super Bowl by a rookie: 55 yards

=== 49ers franchise records ===
- Longest successful field goal by a rookie: 57 yards
- Longest field goal converted in a Super Bowl: 55 yards
- Longest field goal converted in a postseason game: 55 yards
- Most field goals converted in a single game: 6 (tied with Robbie Gould, Ray Wersching, and Jeff Wilkins)
