= Dante Nori =

American baseball player (born 2004)

Philadelphia Phillies
- Outfielder
- Born: October 7, 2004 (age 22); Toronto, Ontario, Canada
- Bats: Left Throws: Left

Dante Nori (born October 7, 2004) is a Canadian-born American professional baseball outfielder in the Philadelphia Phillies organization. He was drafted by the Phillies in the first round of the 2024 MLB draft.

== Amateur career ==
Nori attended Northville High School in Northville, Michigan, where he played baseball. As a senior in 2024, he hit .477 with twenty stolen bases. He committed to play college baseball at Mississippi State University.

== Professional career ==
Nori was drafted by the Philadelphia Phillies in the first round with the 27th overall selection of the 2024 Major League Baseball draft. On July 24, 2024, Nori signed with the Phillies on $2.5 million contract. He made his professional debut after signing with the Clearwater Threshers and hit .240 with four stolen bases across 14 games.

Nori returned to Clearwater to open the 2025 season. In August, he was promoted to the Jersey Shore BlueClaws, and in September, he was promoted once again to the Reading Fightin Phils, with whom he finished the season. Over 125 games played, Nori batted .261 with four home runs, 47 RBI, and 52 stolen bases. After the season, he was assigned to play in the Arizona Fall League (AFL) with the Surprise Saguaros. Nori was assigned to Reading to begin the 2026 season. He missed time during the season due to a stress fracture in his hip. Nori played in 67 games for Reading and hit .244 with three home runs, 26 RBI, and 17 stolen bases. He returned to play in the AFL with Surprise following the season's end.

== Personal life ==
Nori is the son of Micah Nori, a professional basketball coach. Nori was born in Toronto while his father was working for the Toronto Raptors of the National Basketball Association. He has a sister named Mia.
