= Northville High School =

Location
- 45700 Six Mile Road; Northville Charter Township (Northville address), Michigan 48168; United States; 42°24′42″N 83°29′42″W

Information
- Type: Public High School
- School district: Northville Public Schools
- Principal: Tony Koski
- Teaching staff: 107.10 (FTE)
- Grades: 9–12
- Enrollment: 2,489 (2023-2024)
- Student to teacher ratio: 23.24
- Colors: Black and orange
- Mascot: Mustang
- Yearbook: Palladium
- Website: nhs.northvilleschools.org

Northville High School is the public high school of Northville Public Schools located in Northville Charter Township, Michigan, with a Northville postal address.

Within Wayne County the school serves most of Northville Township and the county's portion of Northville. Within Oakland County the school serves that county's portion of Northville, as well as Novi Township, the southwestern part of the city of Novi, and a southeastern part of Lyon Charter Township. Within Washtenaw County it serves a small part of Salem Township.

== History ==
The previous high school opened in 1959. With the substantial growth of the surrounding community, the district constructed a larger facility on Six Mile Road in Northville Township in 2000. The previous building became Hillside Middle School. As the school district population has grown throughout the years, so has the high school. Two years after the construction of the new building, an extension to the east wing of the building was added. A cafeteria annex and a student fitness center have also been constructed. 2287 students were enrolled at the beginning of the 2012–13 school year. In 2019, 80% of Hillside Middle School was demolished to build a new middle school building, which opened in fall 2021.

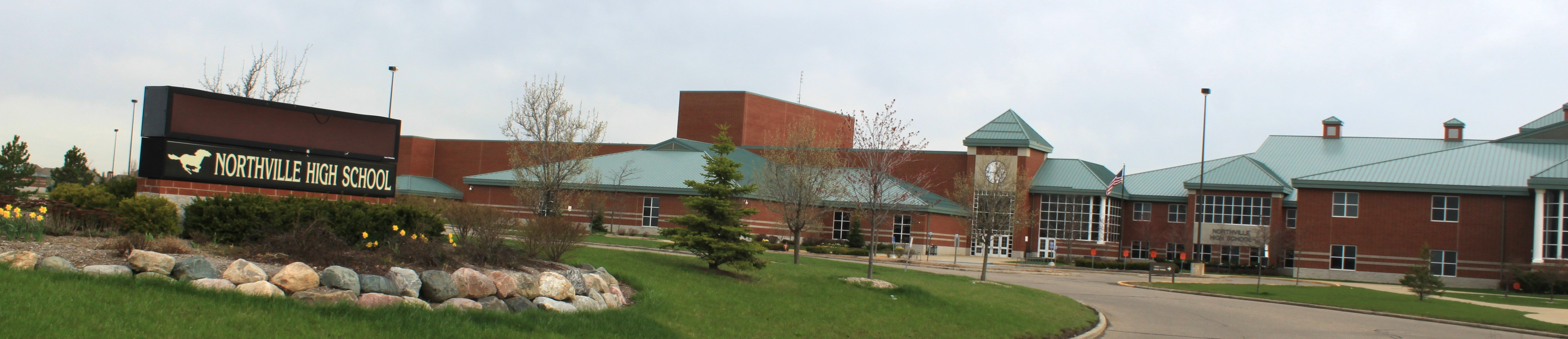
Northville High School

== Academics ==
Student assessments
- 2021–22 school year Change vs. prior year

M-STEP 11th grade proficiency rates (Science / Social Studies)
- Advanced %: 42.7 / 33.5
- Proficient %: 28.7 / 33.7
- PR. Proficient %: 11.2 / 28.2
- Not Proficient %: 17.4 / 4.6

Average test scores
- SAT Total: 1178.5 (▼ −11.4)

=== Rankings ===
- In 2014, NHS was named a Silver Medal High School by U.S. News & World Report, one of 50 schools in Michigan to receive this award
- Furthermore, NHS was ranked in the top 500 schools nationally and nearly in the top 300 STEM schools.

== Extracurricular activities ==
=== Athletics ===
Northville High School has teams in the following sports: football, cross country, soccer, golf, basketball, wrestling, swimming, hockey, baseball, track, tennis, lacrosse, cheerleading, pom pon, volleyball, gymnastics, and softball. Northville High School also offers club sports teams in ultimate frisbee, hockey, rugby, bowling, figure skating, equestrian, triathlon, the Northville Rowing Club, and many more.

Northville's athletics teams have a strong dominance over state-level sports, with various groups, such as the Cross Country, Golf, and Rowing teams winning their respective state championships, alongside many other teams winning at a divisional and conference level. Additionally, the Northville Rowing Club took home the national championship in the women’s JV 4 event at the 2023 Scholastic Regatta Association of America national competition.

=== Publications ===
The yearbook Palladium is produced through a course. In 2008, the formerly discontinued newspaper, the Mustanger, was re-introduced. It was later discontinued again in favor of broadcasting. Originally a live show, the Northville News Network, a pre-recorded newscast, does announcements and school-wide news, along with other entertaining student-life segments. A YouTube channel was launched in 2022 so viewers outside of the school could watch.

=== Music and the Arts ===
Northville High School has award-winning choir, band, and orchestra departments. There are 8 choirs, 3 of which are audition-based, under the direction of Ms. Richert, including acapella groups Backbeat and Treblemakers. There are multiple bands as well, marching, symphonic, and jazz, all under the direction of Mr. Rumbell, who has been teaching band (and formerly choir as well), since 1972. The Northville High Orchestra is under the direction of Dr. Ray-Hepp, and has received several accolades including being invited to perform at the 2026 Michigan Music Conference and the 2027 ASTA (American String Teachers Association) National Conference.

== Notable alumni ==
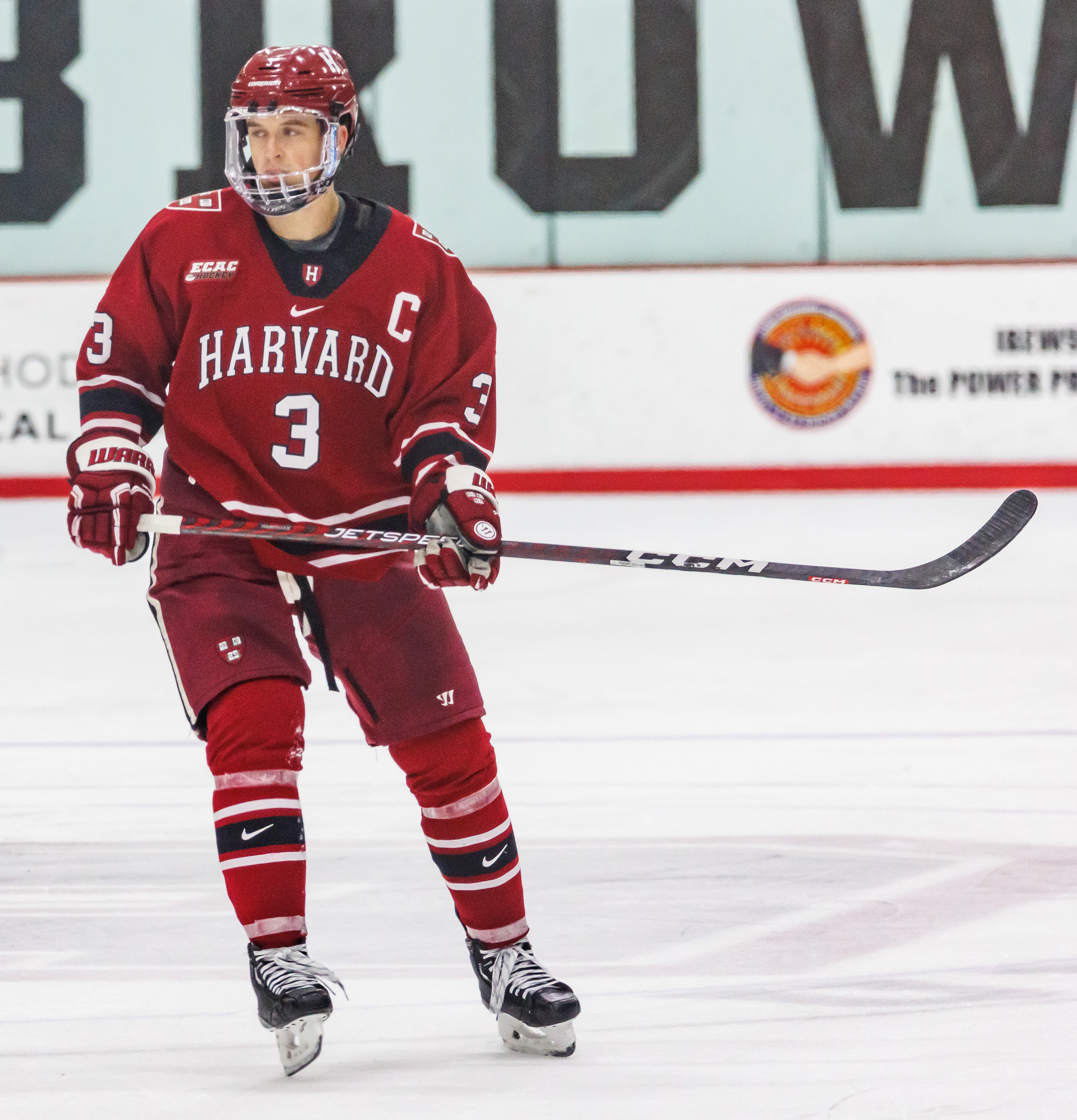
Henry Thrun

- Matthew Boldy, professional ice hockey player
- Jake Moody, kicker for the San Francisco 49ers
- Henry Thrun, American ice hockey player
- Amy Yakima, winner of season 10 of So You Think You Can Dance
- Kelly Breen, politician serving in the Michigan House of Representatives
- Jack Studnicka, professional hockey player
- Joe Tracz, writer of The Lightning Thief (musical) and writer of Be More Chill (musical)
- Dante Nori, baseball player for the Philadelphia Phillies
