= Novi Township, Michigan =

- Civil township
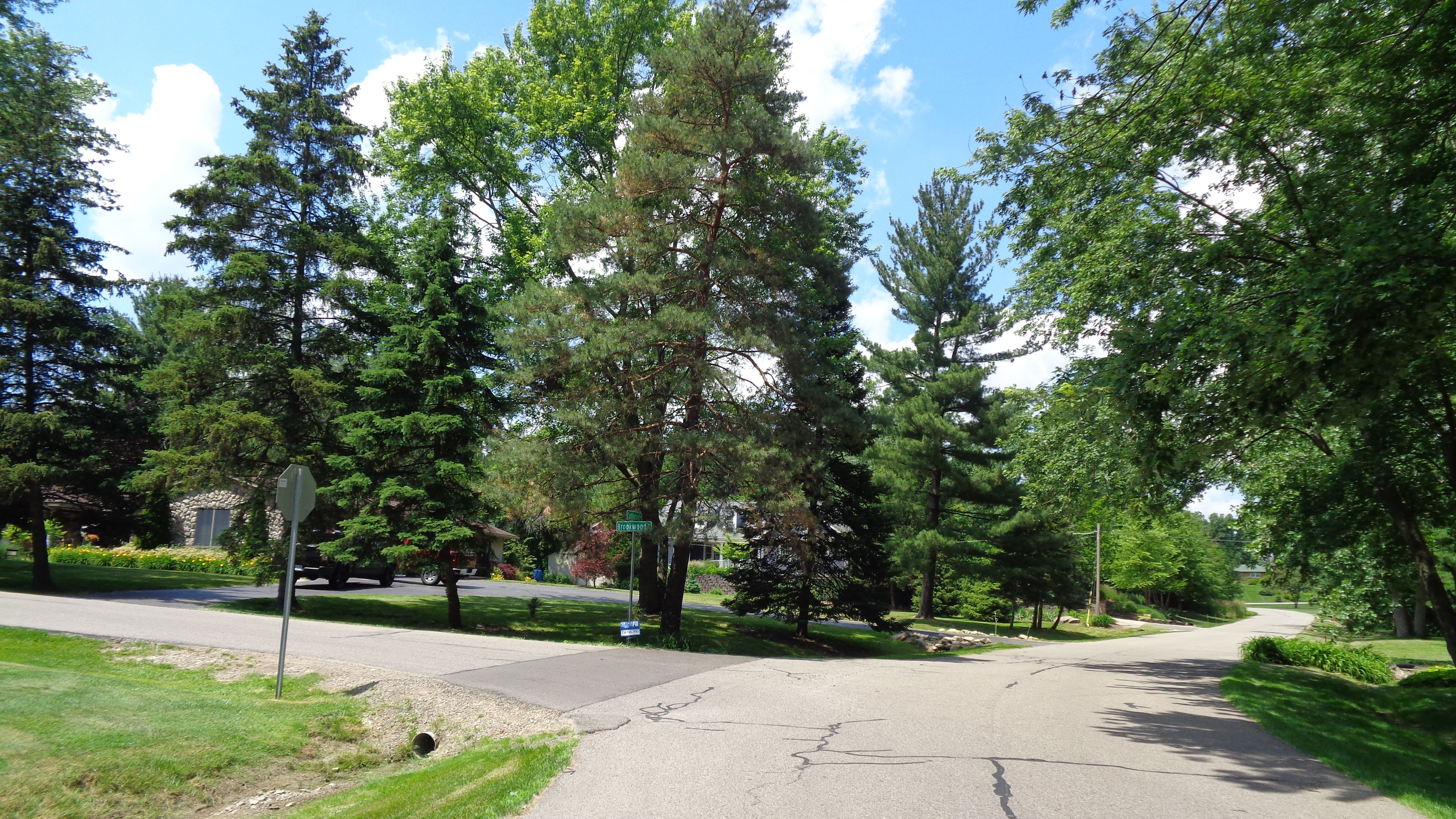
- Cottisford Street and Brookwood Drive

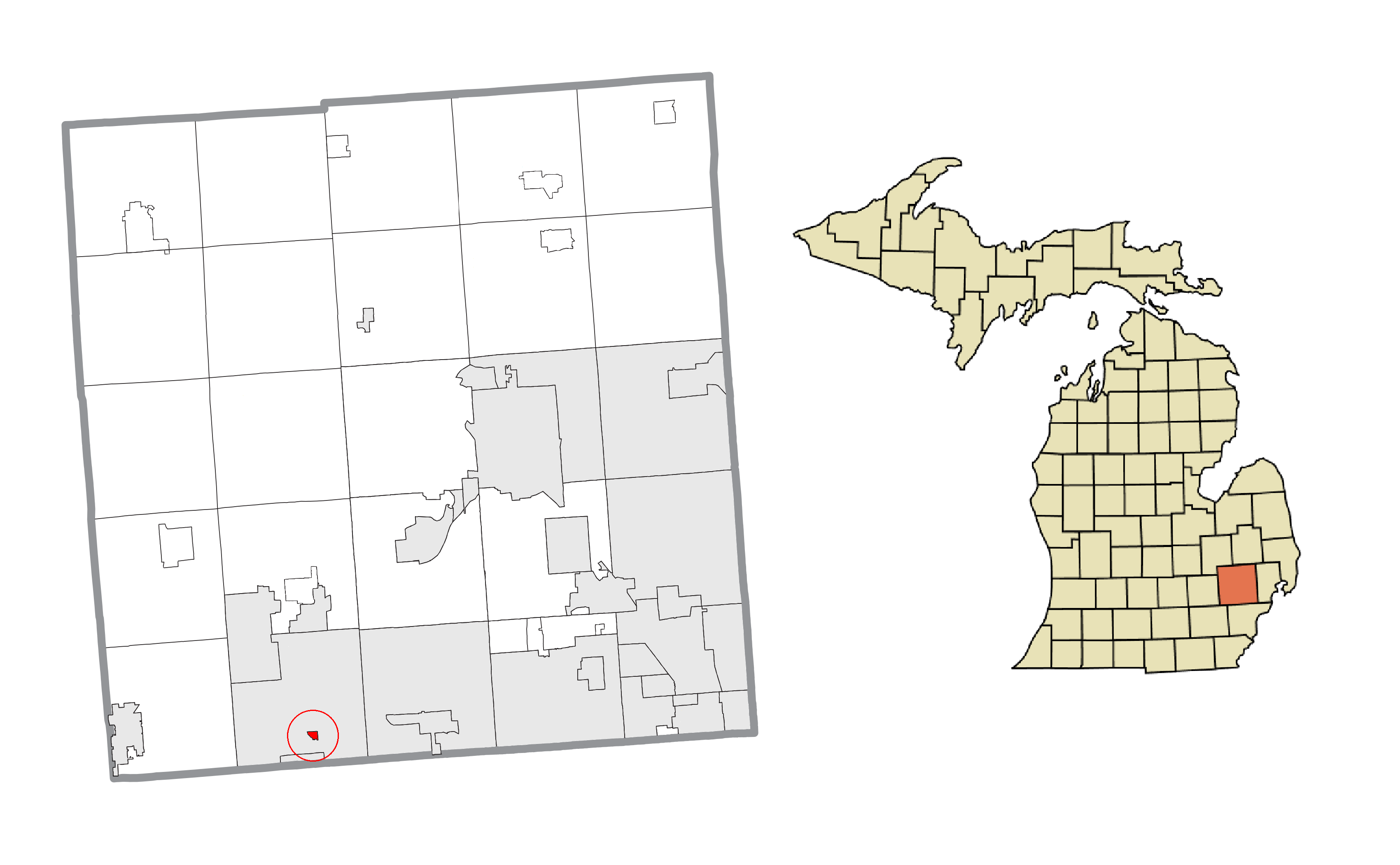
- Location within Oakland County

- Location within the state of Michigan Novi Township (the United States)
- Coordinates: 42°27′22″N 83°28′56″W
- Country: United States
- State: Michigan
- County: Oakland
- Organized: 1832

Government
  - Supervisor: Tony Galdikas
  - Clerk: Janeen Crittenden

Area
  - Civil township: 0.11 sq mi (0.28 km^{2})
  - Land: 0.11 sq mi (0.28 km^{2})
  - Water: 0 sq mi (0.0 km^{2})
- Elevation: 899 ft (274 m)

Population (2020)
  - Civil township: 160
  - Density: 1,500/sq mi (570/km^{2})
  - Metro: 4,285,832 (Metro Detroit)
- Time zone: UTC-5 (Eastern (EST))
  - Summer (DST): UTC-4 (EDT)
- ZIP code(s): 48167 (Northville)
- Area code: 248
- FIPS code: 26-59460
- GNIS feature ID: 1626830

Novi Township is a civil township of Oakland County in the U.S. state of Michigan. At the 2020 census, the township had a population of 160. Of the original 36-square-mile (93 km^{2}) survey township, only a small portion of 0.11 square miles (0.28 km^{2}) remains unincorporated from the surrounding city of Novi. Novi Township is the smallest township in the state by total land area and the third-smallest municipality after the villages of Ahmeek and Copper City.

The township consists solely of the Brookland Farms #1 subdivision and is served by the Northville 48167 ZIP Code. Students within Novi Township attend Northville Public Schools.

== History ==
Novi Township was organized in 1832 from Farmington Township. The name was offered by resident Dr. J.C. Emery, at the suggestion of his wife. Residents were reportedly looking for a shorter name than Farmington. Several popular but historically inaccurate explanations have been suggested for the origin of the name Novi. One version is that it was named after the 6th tollgate on the Grand River toll road (No. VI). However, the township was named in 1832 and the toll road wasn't constructed until the 1850s. A similar claim is made about the township being stop number 6 on the railroad. However, the railroad was not constructed through the township until 1870 - 1871, almost 40 years after it was named.

== Annexation and incorporation ==
Only a small portion of the original Township of Novi remains unincorporated. The majority of the township incorporated first as the Village of Novi in 1958 and later into the City of Novi in 1969. Before the incorporation of the Village of Novi, the northwest portion of the township was incorporated as part of the Village of Wixom, which later incorporated as the City of Wixom. Portions of the township were annexed into the Village of Northville in the early 1900s (the Oakwood Subdivision north of Baseline Road) and the City of Northville in the 1950s. In the 1970s, several areas of the township which had been detached from the Village of Novi were annexed into the City of Novi following a long legal battle between the city and township. These areas include the Hometown Novi Mobile Home Park and land that now includes portions of Chase Farm subdivision, Maples of Novi, and Island Lake of Novi. Some of the legal disputes over the annexations were not resolved until 1984.

== Political ==
The remaining area of the township is a legally separate entity from the surrounding City of Novi and has all the powers granted under Michigan state law to general law townships. The township has no township hall and township board meetings and township elections are held at the homes of the township board members. Most of the township services are provided through contracts with the City of Novi including fire protection and library services. The historic township hall was once located on the west side of Novi Road, south of Grand River Avenue. Moved to the civic center campus in the late 1980s, the building was restored by volunteers. The historic township hall is currently located on Ten Mile Road in the City of Novi, just west of the Novi Public Library and adjacent to the site of the former historic Fuerst Farmstead. The historic township hall is owned by the City of Novi. From 2004 to 2024, the Township Supervisor was John Juntunen. In 2024, Tony Galdikas was elected as Township Supervisor.

== Geography and land use ==
According to the United States Census Bureau, the township has a total area of 0.11 square miles (0.28 km^{2}), all land. The township has a gently rolling topography. Most of the township is covered by light to heavy woodland cover and has been developed for single-family homes. The remaining land consists of road right-of-way and a few undeveloped platted lots. At approximately 70 acres (28 ha), Novi Township is the smallest township in area in the State of Michigan.

== Demographics ==
The 2010 Census population for the township was 150 people. As of the 2000 census, there were 193 people, 66 households, and 59 families residing in the township. The population density was 1,397.8 inhabitants per square mile (539.7/km^{2}). There were 68 housing units at an average density of 492.5 per square mile (190.2/km^{2}). The racial makeup of the township was 94.82% White, 0.52% Native American, 3.63% Asian, and 1.04% from two or more races.

As of the 2000 census, there were 66 households, out of which 42.4% had children under the age of 18 living with them, 87.9% were married couples living together, 1.5% had a female householder with no husband present, and 10.6% were non-families. 10.6% of all households were made up of individuals, and 6.1% had someone living alone who was 65 years of age or older. The average household size was 2.92 and the average family size was 3.15. Despite its small size, there are other townships in Michigan with a smaller population.

As of the 2000 census, in the township the population was spread out, with 30.1% under the age of 18, 3.1% from 18 to 24, 19.7% from 25 to 44, 37.8% from 45 to 64, and 9.3% who were 65 years of age or older. The median age was 43 years. For every 100 females, there were 99.0 males. For every 100 females age 18 and over, there were 92.9 males.

As of the 2000 census, the median income for a household in the township was $105,172, and the median income for a family was $114,146. Males had a median income of $85,606 versus $46,750 for females. The per capita income for the township was $36,985. None of the population or families were below the poverty line.
