= Northville Charter Township, Michigan =

American township in Michigan

Northville Township, Michigan
- Charter township
- Charter Township of Northville
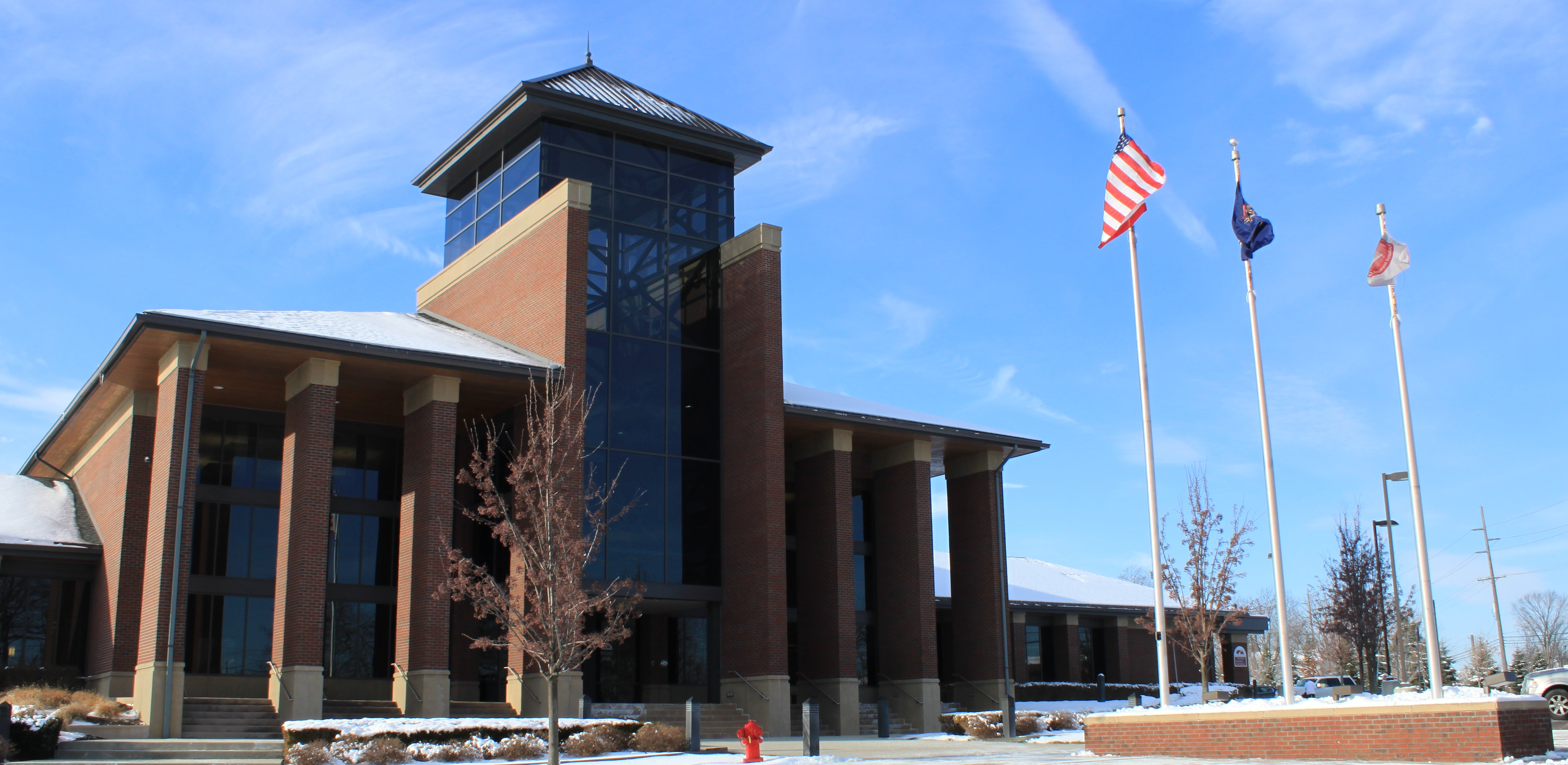
- Northville Township Municipal Building

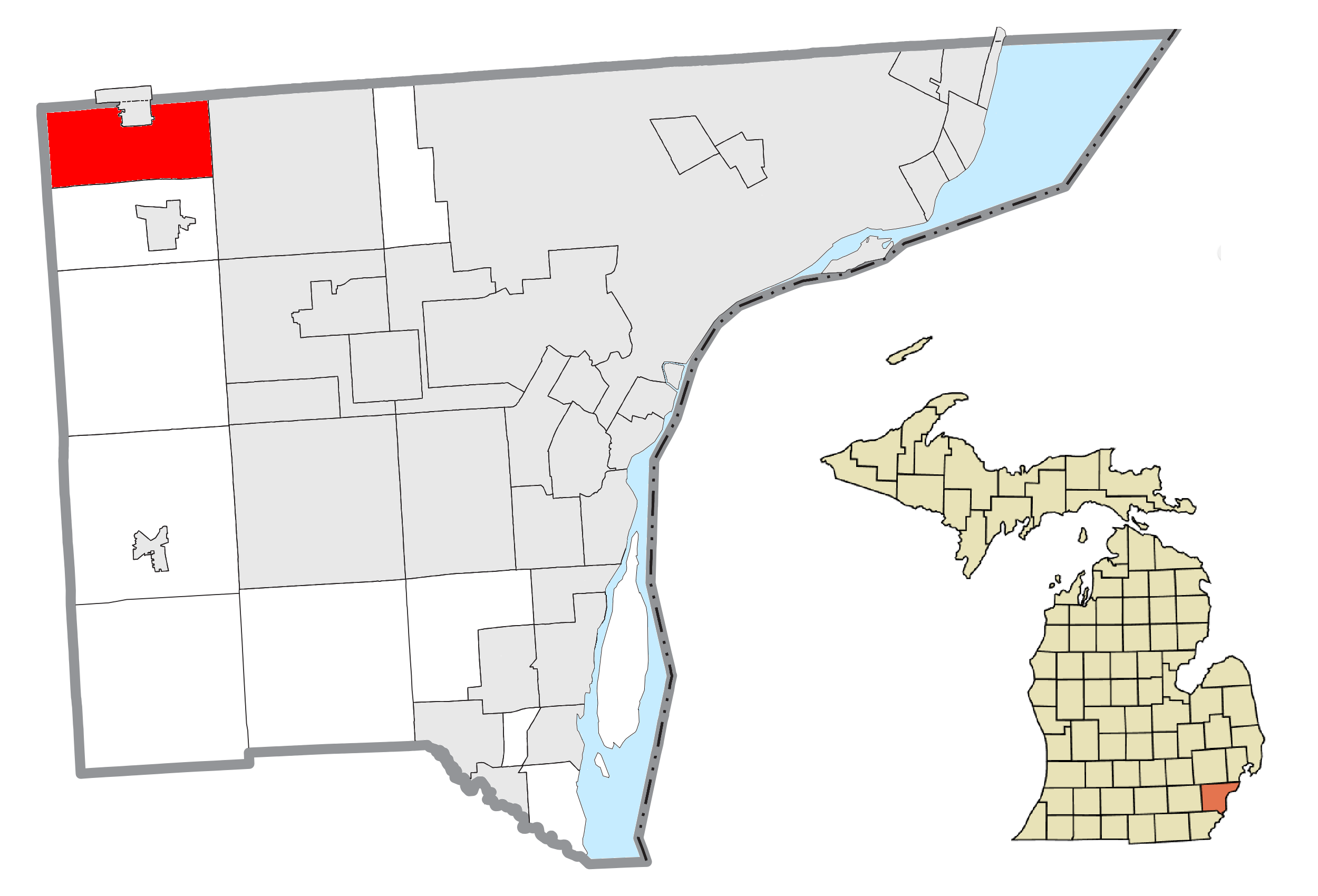
- Location within Wayne County

- Location within the state of Michigan Location within the United States
- Coordinates: 42°24′45″N 83°28′08″W
- Country: United States
- State: Michigan
- County: Wayne
- Established: 1898

Government
  - Supervisor: Mark Abbo (R)
  - Clerk: Cynthia Jankowski
  - Treasurer: Jason Rhines

Area
  - Charter township: 16.57 sq mi (42.92 km^{2})
  - Land: 16.19 sq mi (41.93 km^{2})
  - Water: 0.38 sq mi (0.98 km^{2})
- Elevation: 843 ft (257 m)

Population (2020)
  - Charter township: 31,758
  - Density: 1,962/sq mi (757.4/km^{2})
  - Metro: 4,285,832 (Metro Detroit)
- Time zone: UTC-5 (EST)
  - Summer (DST): UTC-4 (EDT)
- ZIP code(s): 48167, 48168 (Northville); 48170 (Plymouth)
- Area codes: 248 and 734
- FIPS code: 26-59000
- GNIS feature ID: 1626818
- Website: Official website

Northville Township is a charter township in Wayne County in the U.S. state of Michigan. A western suburb of Detroit, Northville Township is located roughly 27 miles (43.5 km) northwest of downtown Detroit, and 20 miles (32.2 km) northeast of Ann Arbor. As of the 2020 census, the township had a population of 31,758. It is independent of the neighboring city of Northville.

== Geography ==
According to the United States Census Bureau, the township has a total area of 16.57 square miles (42.92 km^{2}), of which 16.19 square miles (41.93 km^{2}) is land and 0.38 square miles (0.98 km^{2}) (2.29%) is water.

Portions of Northville Township were incorporated into the Village of Northville, which later incorporated as the City of Northville. Portions of the township have also since been annexed to the city. The most recent annexation was property owned by the City of Northville as part of the Rural Hill Cemetery. The entire township is served by the Northville District Library and by its own police and fire departments.

== History ==
While the village of Northville developed within the borders of Plymouth Township from the 1820s, Northville Township itself did not exist until 1898. At that time, local residents, allegedly feeling slighted by Plymouth Township officials being more focused on Plymouth Village, decided to split off into a separate township. In this way, the former Plymouth "SuperTownship" (which formerly included all of Canton, Plymouth, and Northville Townships) became split into Plymouth Township and Northville Township.

Northville Township later became a charter township in 1985.

1907 Salem Train Crash

The 1907 Salem Train Crash occurred in what is now Northville Township, approximately a quarter mile east of Napier Road and a quarter mile north of Five Mile Road. 34 individuals lost their lives in the deadliest passenger train crash in Michigan history.

=== ZIP code ===
In response to the rapid growth of the township, a new 48168 ZIP code was introduced in June 2005 to those living south of Seven Mile Road. Those living on or north of the road (as well as those living in the city of Northville) kept the 48167 zip code, as well as any residents with a 48170 ZIP code (Plymouth).

=== 2009 budget crisis and proposed public safety layoffs ===
In late September 2009, just more than a month after the hospital property purchase, the Northville Township Board of Trustees stated that they were operating with a budget deficit. The Board began the process of asking department heads and directors to find ways to cut their budgets. One of the proposed cuts was the laying off of 5 police officers and 2 public safety dispatchers, roughly a 15-20% reduction in police manpower. The Northville Township police union went door-to-door passing out flyers to educate the public on the board proposed cuts and to invite the public to voice their opinions on the issue to the township Board of Trustees.

On October 1, 2009, Northville Township residents voiced their displeasure over proposed public safety cuts on the 2010 budget. Several of the residents in attendance criticized the Township Board of Trustees for not doing more to maintain the public safety department. Board members came under scrutiny for supporting the August ballot initiative to buy the 414 acres (1.68 km^{2}) of the former Northville Regional Psychiatric Hospital property, knowing that there was a budget shortfall. Several residents argued that the Board should have asked for a millage to support their current level of service, instead of asking voters to support the land purchase. Township trustees stated that the two issues were unrelated.

On October 15, 2009, a little more than two months after the Psychiatric Hospital property vote, the Northville Township Board of Trustees approved the 2010 fiscal budget. The budget, as approved, authorized the laying off of 5 police officers and 2 public safety dispatchers. The budget also required many of the township's non-union employees to take mandatory furlough days. In an attempt to prevent police layoffs, a local lottery winner proposed to give Northville Township the money necessary to make up for the alleged public safety budget deficit, approximately $640,000. The Board of Trustees turned down the offer stating that one of its conditions, the maintenance of current public safety staffing, was not a condition they could legally accept. The Board of Trustees stated that if the police officers’ union were to agree to concessions, then the layoffs would be avoided. Residents continued to publicly voice their displeasure with the Board's decision, with some residents even suggesting a possible campaign to recall the members of the township board.

== Demographics ==
=== Racial and ethnic composition ===
Northville Charter Township, Michigan – Racial and ethnic composition Note: the US Census treats Hispanic/Latino as an ethnic category. This table excludes Latinos from the racial categories and assigns them to a separate category. Hispanics/Latinos may be of any race.
Race / Ethnicity (NH = Non-Hispanic)	Pop 2000	Pop 2010	Pop 2020	% 2000	% 2010	% 2020
White alone (NH)	18,538	23,049	22,680	88.13%	80.88%	71.42%
Black or African American alone (NH)	914	1,021	952	4.34%	3.58%	3.00%
Native American or Alaska Native alone (NH)	47	32	21	0.22%	0.11%	0.07%
Asian alone (NH)	891	3,205	5,822	4.24%	11.25%	18.33%
Native Hawaiian or Pacific Islander alone (NH)	6	9	2	0.03%	0.03%	0.01%
Other race alone (NH)	18	40	125	0.09%	0.14%	0.39%
Mixed race or Multiracial (NH)	250	470	1,043	1.19%	1.65%	3.28%
Hispanic or Latino (any race)	372	671	1,113	1.77%	2.35%	3.50%
Total	21,036	28,497	31,758	100.00%	100.00%	100.00%

=== 2000 census ===
As of the census of 2000, there were 21,036 people, 8,119 households, and 5,569 families residing in the township. The population density was 1,278.5 inhabitants per square mile (493.6/km^{2}). There were 8,480 housing units at an average density of 515.4 per square mile (199.0/km^{2}). The racial makeup of the township was 89.31% White, 4.39% African American, 0.28% Native American, 4.30% Asian, 0.03% Pacific Islander, 0.44% from other races, and 1.25% from two or more races. Hispanic or Latino residents of any race were 1.77% of the population.

There were 8,119 households, out of which 28.6% had children under the age of 18 living with them, 60.5% were married couples living together, 6.3% had a female householder with no husband present, and 31.4% were non-families. 26.4% of all households were made up of individuals, and 9.0% had someone living alone who was 65 years of age or older. The average household size was 2.39 and the average family size was 2.93.

In the township, 21.4% of the population was under the age of 18, 6.1% was from 18 to 24, 29.8% from 25 to 44, 28.8% from 45 to 64, and 13.9% was 65 years of age or older. The median age was 41 years. For every 100 females, there were 86.4 males. For every 100 females age 18 and over, there were 82.2 males.

According to a 2007 estimate the median income for a household in the township was $98,054, and the median income for a family was $123,509. Males had a median income of $76,460 versus $43,198 for females. The per capita income for the township was $40,258. About 1.4% of families and 2.5% of the population were below the poverty line, including 2.3% of those under age 18 and 3.3% of those age 65 or over.

Between 2000 and 2010, the South Asian American population in Northville Township increased from 891 to 3,205, a 260% increase.

== Economy ==
Tenneco is headquartered in the township.

ZF Group North American Operations is based in Northville Township.

== Government and infrastructure ==
The Michigan Department of Corrections operated the Western Wayne Correctional Facility in the township. It closed on December 20, 2004. Northville Township's local government is made up of an elected Township Supervisor, Clerk, Treasurer and four Trustees.

== Highways ==
- I-275 / I-96 (concurrent highways)
- M-14, travels just south of the township in neighboring Plymouth Township
- M-102, named locally as Eight Mile Road; roadway does not carry the M-102 state designation through Northville Township

== Northville Regional Psychiatric Hospital ==
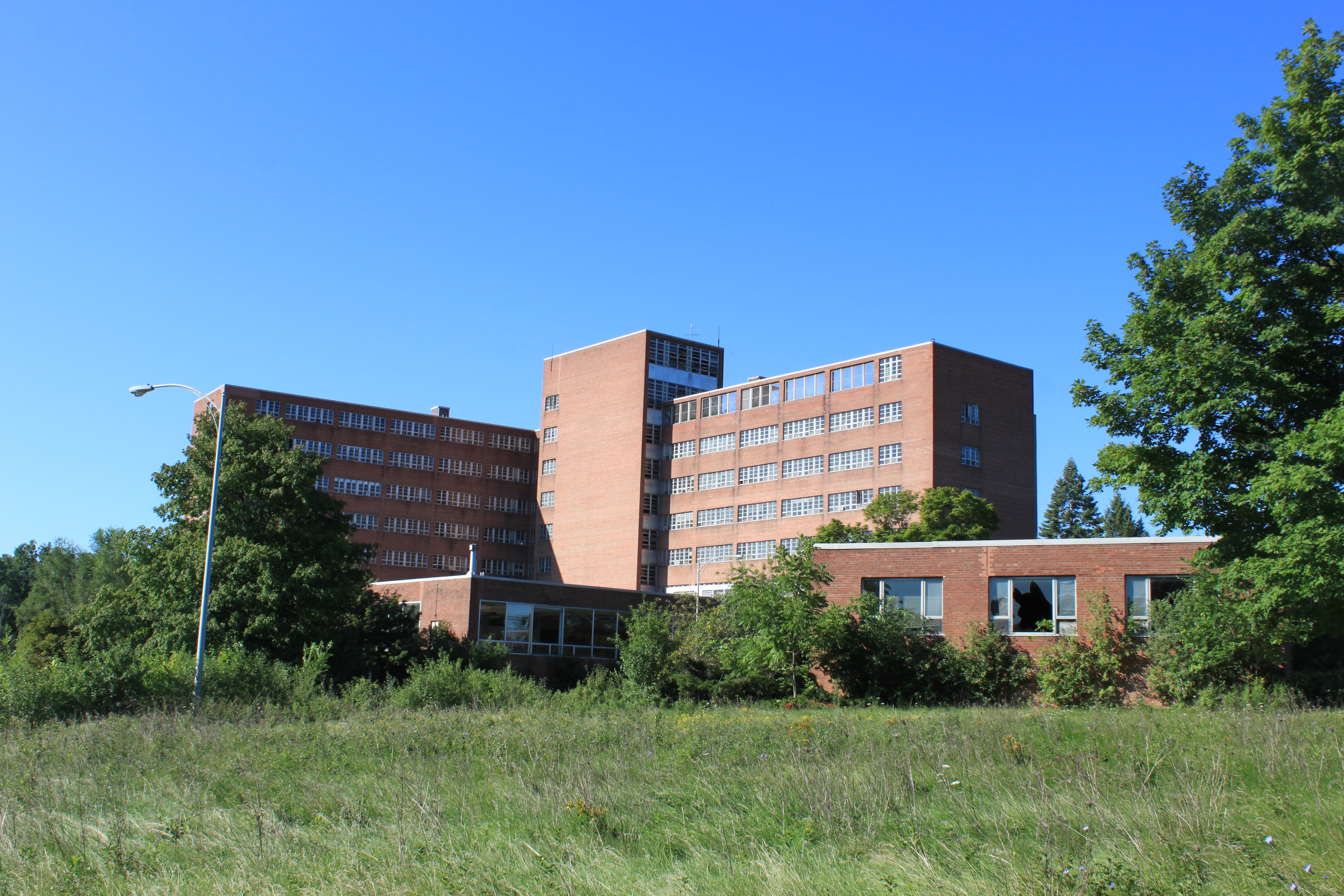
Former Northville Regional Psychiatric Hospital

The Northville Regional Psychiatric Hospital (NRPH) was located on a large (400+ acres) property on 7 Mile Road on the eastern side of the township. It was built in 1952, closed in 2003, and was demolished from 2018 to 2023.

=== 2002–2006 ===
It was announced that the NRPH was to be closed by the Department of Community Health (DCH) on November 18, 2002. By May 2003 all patients had been transferred to a community setting or another state run psychiatric facility. Due to ineffective controls and oversight of the NRPH's closing in 2003, and purchasing, receiving, and payment processes, there is still much unused and used equipment left in the buildings that lost all value during storage. The hospital was closed because of several reasons. First, a declining number of patients in the statewide mental health system. Second, a decline in the workforce, resulting from an early retirement rate, caused the hospital to be shut down. At the time of the closing NPH had 536 employees and 239 patients. The property was sold in a May 2005 auction to REI/Schostak (REIS) for $31.5 million.

=== 2007–2008 ===
In October 2007, the sale of the property to REIS was closed. REIS planned to develop the property into an $800 million, mixed-use residential, office, and retail development called 'Highwood'. Due to the fact that Northville Township would only allow a scaled-down version of Highwood, REIS moved employees to the property in mid-October 2007 for security and to vote to annex the property into neighboring Livonia on August 5, 2008, which approved the original plans for Highwood. Northville and Northville Township residents largely opposed the annexation, which was possible without their consent. Only residents of the area being annexed and the city/township trying to annex the area could vote in the annexation. Residents of the Township started an organization known as 'Stop Annexation'. On August 5, 2008, the residents of the property and Livonia voted against annexation.

=== 2009 ===
On August 4, 2009, residents of Northville Township voted to purchase a majority of the 414-acre (1.68 km^{2}) property for $23.5 million. REIS will retain 68 acres (280,000 m^{2}) to develop into 475,000 sq ft (44,100 m^{2}) or less of retail. An owner of a house worth $300,000 would see a tax increase of $144 (per year). Using REIS tax dollars, Northville Township will clean the property extensively. The property will become open, natural space with trails.

The main building of the hospital is being demolished by Adamo Demolition but due to higher level of asbestos, the demolition was delayed. However, this was quickly resolved and the buildings were razed without issue on Friday, November 30, 2018.

== Education ==
A majority of the township is served by Northville Public Schools. A small portion of the township is served by Plymouth-Canton Community Schools.

Schools within the township from the former district include Moraine, Ridge Wood, Silver Springs, and Winchester elementary schools, as well as Meads Mill Middle School and Northville High School. Additionally, sections of the township are zoned to Hillside Middle School in Northville.

Tanger Elementary of Plymouth-Canton is in the township. The latter school district operates the Plymouth-Canton Educational Park for high school.
