= Detroit House of Correction =

American prison

Coordinates: 42°23′35.4″N 83°31′15.7″W

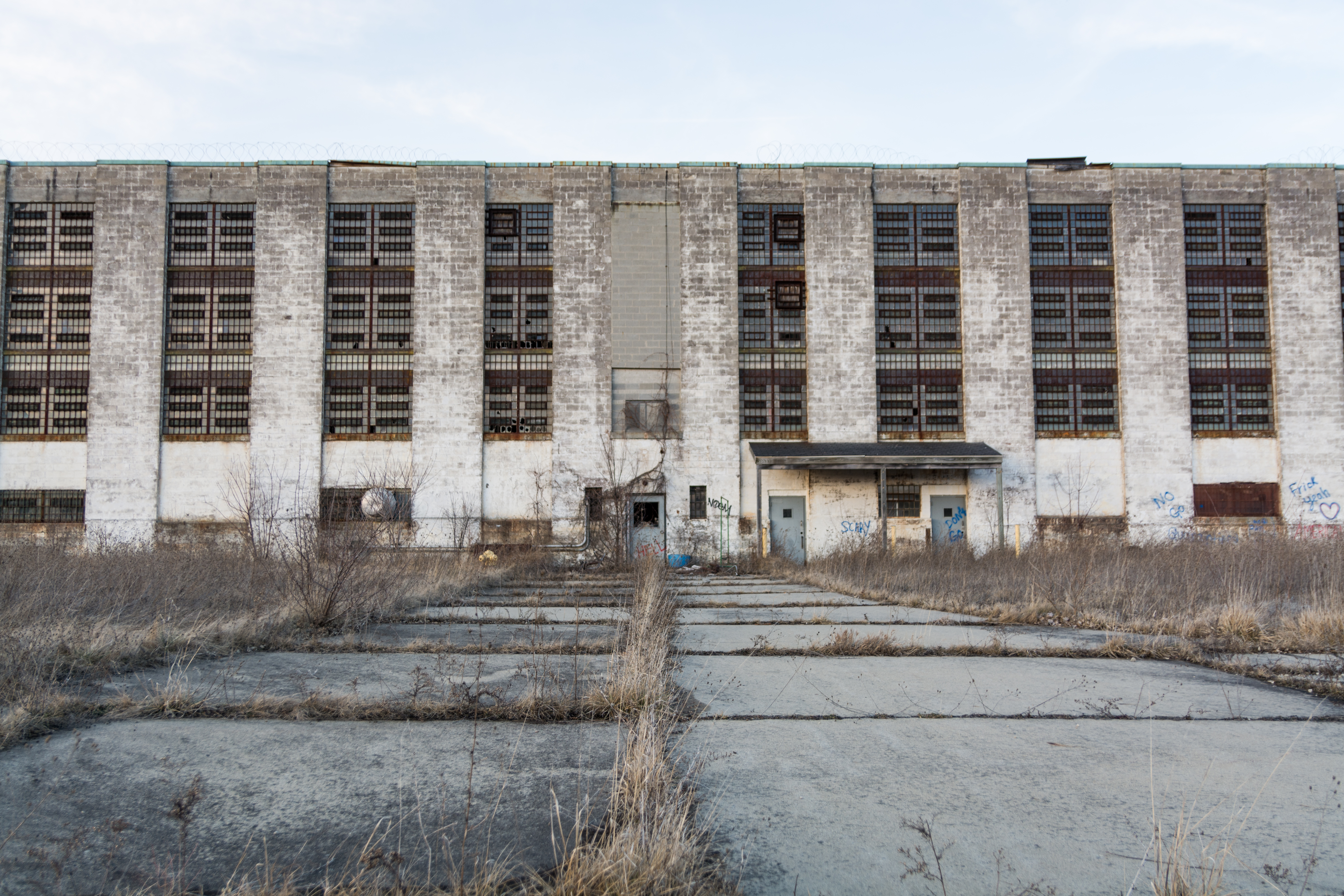
- Interactive map of Detroit House of Correction
- Location: Plymouth Township, Michigan
- Status: Demolished 2017
- Opened: 1861
- Closed: December 2004
- Managed by: Michigan Department of Corrections

The Detroit House of Correction (DeHoCo), opened in 1861, was owned and operated by the City of Detroit but initially accepted prisoners from across the state, including women. It was the first state-operated prison for female felons. The state later renovated the women’s division into the new Phoenix facility. In 1986, the Detroit House of Correction was transferred to state control, renamed the Western Wayne Correctional Facility, and functioned as a women’s prison for the remainder of its operation. It closed in December 2004, and all inmates and staff were transferred to the Women's Huron Valley Correctional Facility in Ypsilanti.

== History ==
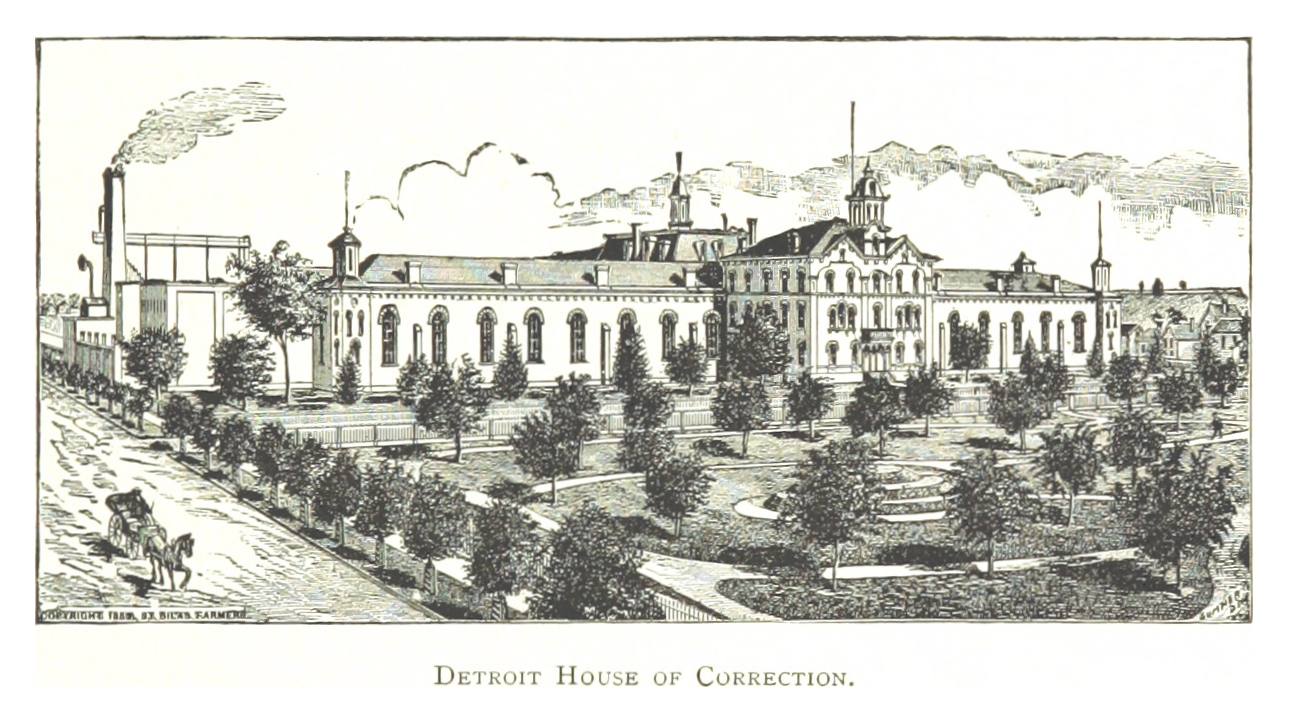
Detroit House of Correction circa 1884 in Detroit's Eastern Market

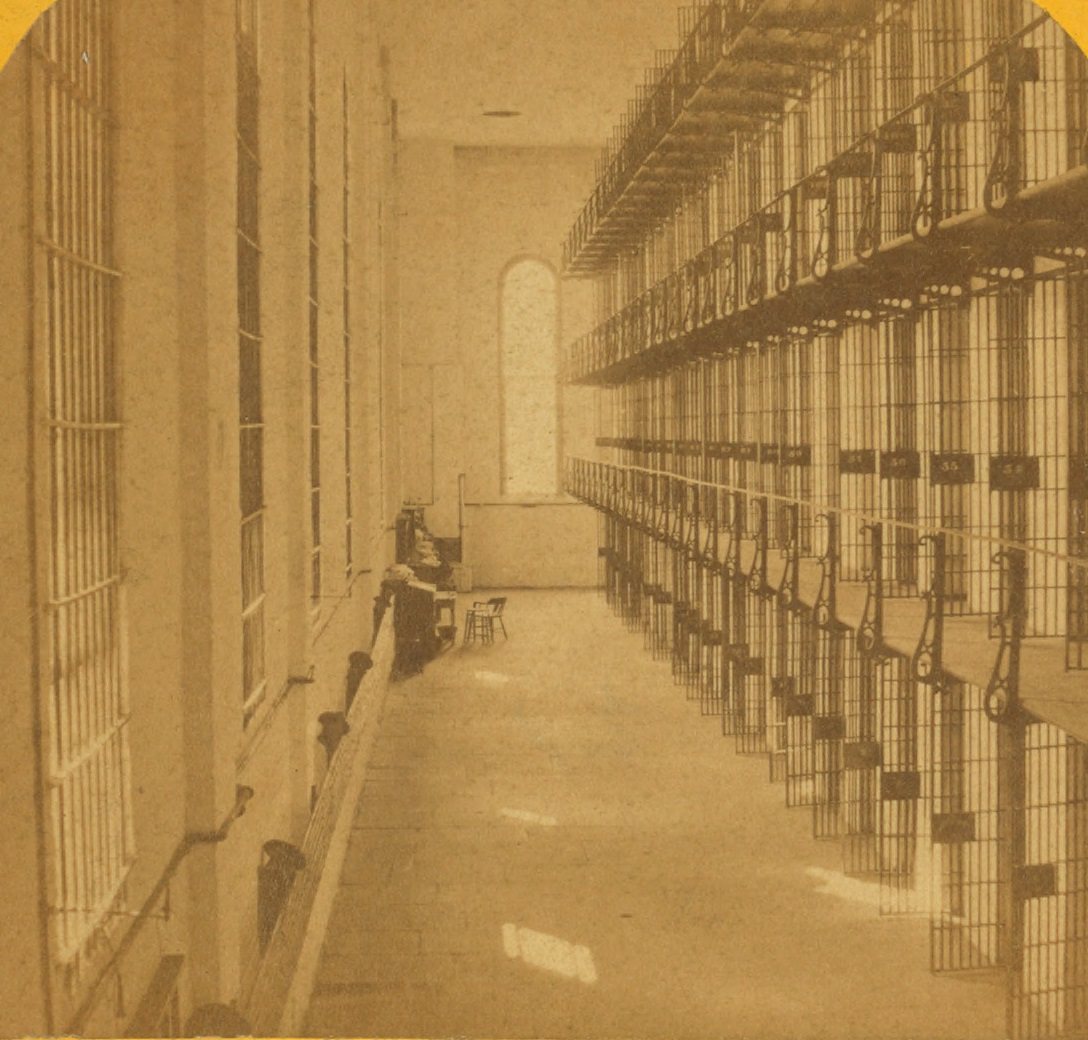
Interior of the Detroit House of Correction in the late 1800s

The first Detroit House of Correction opened in 1861 near Detroit's Eastern Market.

In 1919, the city of Detroit purchased approximately 1,000 acres (400 ha) in Plymouth Township and Northville Township for approximately US$30 (equivalent to $557.1 in 2025) an acre to house a new Detroit House of Correction. A prison camp, with inmates sleeping in tents, was opened in 1920. A permanent US$2,500,000 (equivalent to $48,182,271 in 2025) maximum security facility was completed in 1930.

The city of Detroit sold a portion of the complex to the Michigan Department of Corrections in 1979 for US$1,600,000 (equivalent to $7,097,662 in 2025), and the remainder of the facility to the department in 1986 for US$6,700,000 (equivalent to $19,678,962 in 2025). The facility was then renamed to Western Wayne Correctional Facility and became a women's facility for the rest of its tenure. The 1930 building closed and sat abandoned since.

In the late 1980s, the warden of the facility took bribes in return for favors from inmates.

The facility closed in December 2004 and all inmates and staff were transferred to the Women's Huron Valley Correctional Facility in Ypsilanti.

In January 2002, Kojaian Management Corporation purchased the property for US$50,000,000 (equivalent to $89,500,463 in 2025).

== Detroit ownership ==
Plymouth Township acquired 323 acres (131 ha) of the property in September 2011 for US$606,150 (equivalent to $867,530 in 2025). The land was available for purchase by the government due to unpaid taxes.

In May 2016, the City of Detroit, is in ownership of 190 acres of the land Plymouth Township acquired. The courts agreed that under Michigan land law, the ownership of the property still resides with the City of Detroit. The other 133 acres, of the 323 Plymouth Township acquired, was correctly sold, by Detroit, in 2006, to a private developer, who did not pay their land taxes, and forfeited the land to the township. Just to the east of this property, the City of Detroit, owns 45 acres of the original site, where dilapidated prison structures still stood until they were demolished in the spring of 2017.

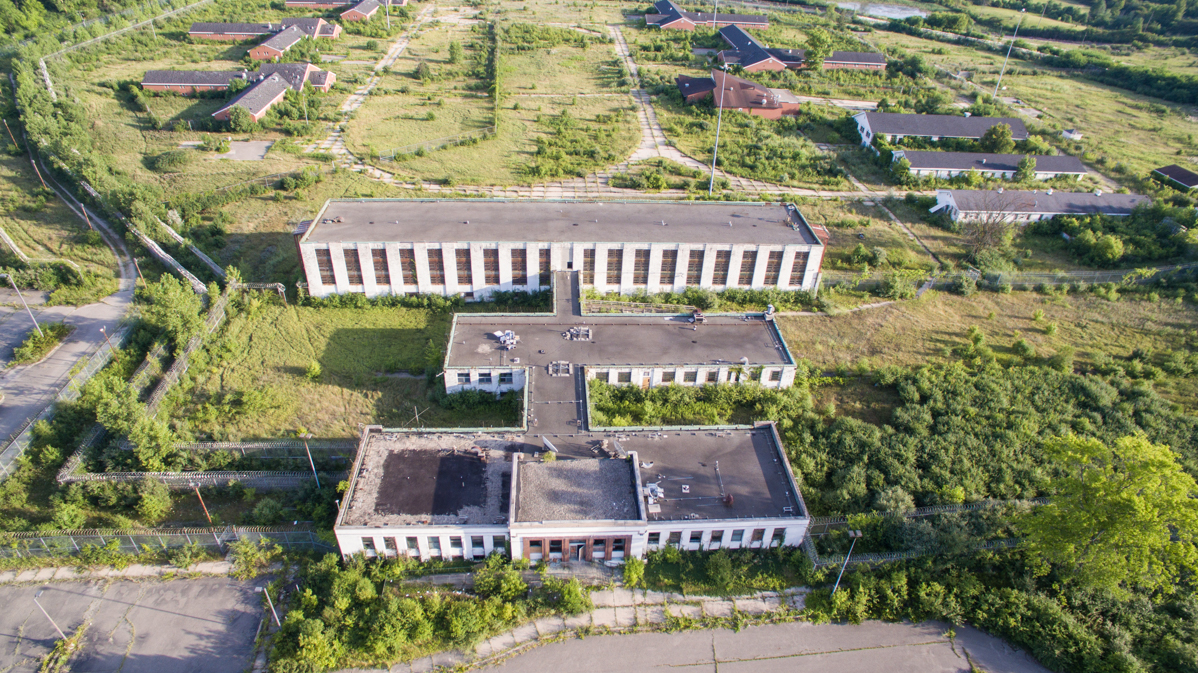
Taken a couple months before demolition, this was the main building.

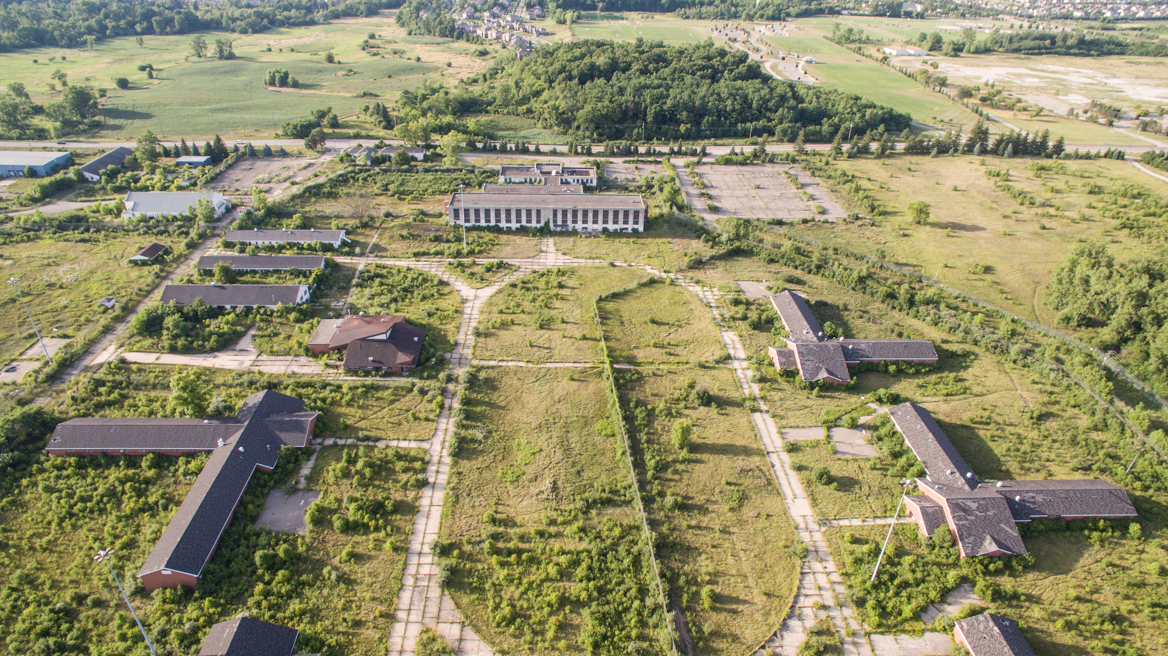
The newer buildings in the rear of the complex housed women prisoners, and were in better shape than the others at the time of demolition.

== Notable inmates ==
Notable inmates during the prison's history included:

- Euphemia Mondich
- Curtis Sliwa
- Belle Starr
- David King Udall

== See also ==
- List of Michigan state prisons
