= Don Massey (car dealer) =

Automotive dealer

Donald E. Massey
- Born: April 28, 1928; Lawrenceburg, Tennessee, U.S.
- Died: June 9, 2011 (aged 83); Northville, Michigan, U.S.
- Occupation: Car dealer
- Known for: Being the largest-volume Cadillac retailer in the country
- Spouse: Joyce Marie Massey (m. 1945; died 1993)
- Children: 3

Donald E. Massey (April 28, 1928 – June 9, 2011), known as the “Cadillac King”, was an American car dealer who owned a chain of automobile dealerships in the United States. At his peak, Massey was the largest Cadillac retailer in the country, accounting for approximately 6% of the brand's sales.

== Career ==
=== Dealerships ===
Don Massey’s career started in construction in his home state of Tennessee. In 1955, he moved his family to the Detroit area and began selling cars. Massey was a natural salesman and by the late 1950s had been promoted to used car manager and then general manager at a Chevrolet dealership in Detroit. In 1961, Massey opened his own used car lot in Wayne, Michigan. About six years later, Massey bought part of the Beglinger Oldsmobile-Cadillac agency in Plymouth, Michigan, and it became Beglinger-Massey Oldsmobile-Cadillac. In 1974, Massey took over full operation of the business and the dealership was renamed Don Massey Cadillac. In 1978, the dealership was relocated to a brand new 54,000 square foot facility about a mile and a half east of the previous site. The new location would be the company's flagship store and by the early 1990s had become the most volume selling Cadillac dealership in the United States.

In the decades that followed, Massey would continue to acquire dealerships in Michigan and several other states. These included dealerships purchased in partnership with professional golfer Arnold Palmer. In addition to Cadillac, other brands sold at various Don Massey dealerships included Bentley, Buick, Chevrolet, Geo, GMC, Honda, Oldsmobile, Pontiac, Rolls-Royce, Saab, Saturn, and Sterling.

Massey retired in 2002 and sold his 16-store dealership empire to Sonic Automotive.

=== Bid for DeLorean Motor Company ===
In November 1982, Charles DeLorean, a Cadillac dealer in Lakewood, Ohio, and brother of John DeLorean, teamed up with Don Massey to try to acquire the assets of bankrupt DeLorean Motor Company. Their attempt was unsuccessful as a federal bankruptcy judge instead approved the sale to Columbus, Ohio-based Consolidated International.

== Last Cadillac Eldorado ==
On April 22, 2002, the last Cadillac Eldorado rolled off the assembly line at the Lansing Craft Center assembly plant in Lansing, Michigan. The car was donated to the Cadillac Museum in honor of Don Massey.

== Philanthropy ==
Massey created the Joyce and Don Massey Family Foundation in honor of his wife, Joyce, who was severely injured in an automobile accident in 1983. The foundation supports research, education and care for patients with traumatic brain injuries. In February 2015, the University of Michigan Health System named a new emergency critical care center in honor of Massey family.

At some point after 1986, the Massey family contributed to the establishment of the Joyce M. Massey Traumatic Brain Injury Unit at St. Joseph Mercy Hospital in Ann Arbor. After Joyce Massey's death, the family established a scholarship fund and a library in Mrs. Massey's name at Madonna University.

== Personal life ==
Massey was married to Joyce (née Coleman) from 1945 until her death in 1993. They had three children. Massey died on June 9, 2011, at his home in Northville, Michigan, at the age of 83.

The Massey estate, which the family bought in 1997, was listed for sale in 2019 with an asking price of $3.5M.
