= Euphemia Mondich =

Polish-American murderer and suspected serial killer

- Mugshot (c. 1924)
- Born: 1884; Austrian Galicia
- Died: August 20, 1961 (aged 77); Detroit House of Correction, Plymouth Charter Township, Michigan, U.S.
- Other name: "Lady Bluebeard"
- Conviction: Murder
- Penalty: Life imprisonment

Details
- Victims: 2–3 (one as accomplice)
- Span of crimes: 1900s–1921
- Country: United States, possibly Poland
- State: Michigan
- Date apprehended: September 8, 1924

Euphemia Mondich (1884 – August 20, 1961), known as Lady Bluebeard, was a Polish–American bigamist, murderer and suspected serial killer who killed at least one husband, and later a lover, in Detroit, Michigan in 1921. Convicted for the final murder, she was sentenced to life imprisonment and remained imprisoned until her death in 1961.

== Early life and marriages ==
Little is known of Mondich's background. Born in 1884 in Austrian Galicia, she was first married there to a man named George Woodwood, who died three years later under mysterious circumstances. Sometime during the 1910s, she emigrated to Toronto, Canada, where she married a man named George Woropchuk. Their marriage lasted for some time until she deserted him in 1914 and moved to the United States, settling in Detroit. While living there, she married Joseph Sokolsky on June 14, 1921. The couple lived in a small house on Osborne Street, where a third man, a 39-year-old fellow emigrant named John Udurovich, also resided.

== Murders ==
=== Joseph Sokolsky ===
Shortly after becoming acquainted, Udurovich fell in love with Mondich, but they could not facilitate their relationship while Sokolsky was still around. And so, on July 7, the trio went out for a ride on a dirt road outside the town. Along the way, Udurovich stopped the car, claiming that a tire had gone flat. Sokolsky then exited the car to help him out, but Udurovich then hit him on the head with a wrench, killing him on the spot. Afterwards, both he and Mondich dragged the body to a nearby brick manufacturing company and dumped the body into a hole used for unloading building materials, covering it with some rubbish. Mondich would later be questioned about her husband's disappearance on July 12, but as there was no credible evidence for an arrest, she was let go. She later filed for divorce on the grounds of cruelty and desertion, which she won and was given ownership of their house on Osborne.

=== John Udurovich ===
Some time after the murder, Udurovich proposed to Mondich, but she denied his advancements on the grounds that the neighbors would get suspicious because of her husband's recent disappearance. Mondich then moved to a house on Dwyer Street, but only three weeks later, Udurovich found her again and threatened her at gunpoint to marry him. Mondich initially pretended to accept his offer, but when he sat down to read the newspaper, she grabbed his revolver and shot him in the abdomen. Frightened, Udurovich attempted to flee through the window, but was shot in the back and fell, whereupon Mondich got closer and shot him in the neck, killing him. On the following morning, she buried the body under the house and moved away yet again.

== Further marriages and arrest ==
Mondich eventually remarried, this time to a man named Steve Mondich. The couple lived together with seemingly no issues for around three years, until Euphemia suddenly deserted him in September 1924, taking $5,700 with her for a supposed move back to her native Poland. Distressed by this, Steve went to the police station and begged the officer in charge to find his wife, mentioning that she had taken some clothing and all the money. In an attempt to bring further attention to his pleas, he mentioned that she had previously been questioned in the disappearance of a previous husband, whereupon Steve was brought to the Homicide Division's room to give further details.

Looking further into her case, detectives not only discovered that she had won a successful divorce lawsuit against her missing husband, but that another man who had been in her company had also gone missing. Four days later, they received an anonymous tip that Mondich was attempting to sell her property at the County Building, where she was arrested and jailed on a murder charge. After refusing to admit her guilt for more than four hours, she finally confessed to shooting a man and burying his body under the house on Dwyer Street, agreeing to show detectives exactly where she had buried him. After excavating the house and uncovering a complete human skeleton, initially believed to be Sokolsky, the investigators were shocked to learn that this was her lover, John Udurovich. Mondich was then brought back to the police station for further questioning, where they learned that she had been in a total of nine relationships across Poland, Canada and the United States, but authorities were unable to locate all of her husbands and suitors.

== Trial, imprisonment, and death ==
In the end, Mondich was charged solely with the Udurovich killing, as authorities were unable to locate Sokolsky's body. While awaiting trial, she stated that she hoped for an acquittal. At the trial, she entered a plea of self-defense, arguing that she was deathly afraid of Udurovich and had no choice but to kill him; to counter this, the prosecution brought parts of Udurovich's skeleton to show where he had been shot, indicating that the killing had been premeditated. Upon seeing them, Mondich burst into tears.

Mondich was eventually found guilty of the murder charge and sentenced to life imprisonment. After her trial, her two surviving husbands met up and congratulated one another on staying alive before bidding her farewell. Mondich was then transferred to the Detroit House of Correction in Plymouth Charter Township, where she remained until her death of a heart attack on August 20, 1961, aged 77. According to Superintendent Jonathan Goldsmith, Mondich had no visitors during the last ten years of her life and spent most of her time tending to the prison flower garden and feeding stray animals. She apparently turned religious during her imprisonment, and would occasionally receive letters from The Salvation Army.

== See also ==
- Black widow
