= Micah Nori =

American basketball coach (born 1974)

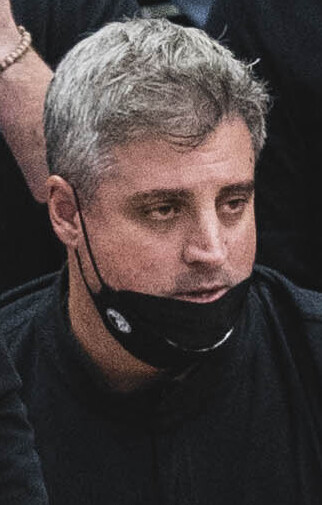
- Nori with the Minnesota Timberwolves in 2021

Portland Trail Blazers
- Position: Head coach
- League: NBA

Personal information
- Born: April 8, 1974 (age 52) Middletown, Ohio, U.S.

Career information
- College: Indiana
- Coaching career: 2009–present

Career history

Coaching
- 2009–2013: Toronto Raptors (assistant)
- 2013–2015: Sacramento Kings (assistant)
- 2015–2018: Denver Nuggets (assistant)
- 2018–2021: Detroit Pistons (assistant)
- 2021–2026: Minnesota Timberwolves (lead assistant)
- 2026–present: Portland Trail Blazers

Micah Nori (/ˈmaɪkə ˈnɔːri/ MY-kə NOR-ee; born April 8, 1974) is an American basketball coach currently serving as the head coach for the Portland Trail Blazers of the National Basketball Association (NBA). He previously served as an assistant coach for the Toronto Raptors, Sacramento Kings, Denver Nuggets, Detroit Pistons, and Minnesota Timberwolves.

He garnered attention in 2023 for his "ingenious, often comic analogies" during sideline interviews at Timberwolves’ games.

== Early life and education ==
Nori grew up in Middletown, Ohio, where his father coached high school football, baseball and basketball. A three-sport athlete himself in high school, Nori ended up at Indiana University, where he was captain and middle infielder of the baseball team. Injuries and a self-professed "lack of athleticism" kept him from pursuing a professional career.

After graduation, Nori earned a master's degree in sports organization at Miami University while serving as a graduate assistant on the baseball team's coaching staff.

== Career ==
=== Early days ===
In 1998, Nori was considering a job as a high school athletic director when family friend (and newly hired Raptors head coach) Butch Carter called and offered him a job in Toronto. He started as a coach's assistant intern before becoming an advance scout. After a brief run as the hitting coach for his alma mater Hoosiers in 2005, he eventually ascended to the Raptors' coaching staff as an assistant.

=== Coaching career ===
Nori spent four seasons with the Raptors under head coaches Jay Triano and Dwane Casey before moving on to the Sacramento Kings in 2013. Nori had met their coach, Michael Malone, for dinner while Malone was an assistant for the Golden State Warriors. After the dinner, Nori texted him saying that when Malone got a head coaching job, he hoped to be considered for his staff.

When Malone became the Nuggets' head coach in 2015, Nori joined the staff as an assistant. That year, he served as head coach of Denver's NBA Summer League team, which included future three-time MVP Nikola Jokić. The team went 3–0.

In Denver, he bonded with fellow assistant Chris Finch. Finch was in charge of the team's offensive schemes, and the two honed a free-flowing style of basketball that would become his calling card in later years.

By 2018, Nori had taken a head assistant job with the Detroit Pistons under his former boss Casey. He served as the team's offensive coordinator.

He kept in touch with Finch, and when Finch was named head coach of the Minnesota Timberwolves before the 2021-22 season, he brought on Nori as his lead assistant. Nori describes his role as like a bench coach in baseball: "the right-hand man with a broad array of input and oversight".

He's often seen doing strategy breakdowns and sideline interviews on Timberwolves' broadcasts, where he gained notoriety for his metaphors, like: "He makes everybody comfortable—he's like popcorn during Saturday night movies." ESPN called him a "unique coaching mind, one who ... breaks down defensive strategy in depth pre-game, with a real level of focus and clarity."

Nori coached Team Pau during the 2024 All-Star Rising Stars Challenge.

On April 28, 2024, Timberwolves head coach Chris Finch injured his patellar tendon after colliding with guard Mike Conley Jr. with 1:41 remaining in Game 4 against the Phoenix Suns, so Nori served as the acting head coach for the remaining 1:41 of the game. With Finch on crutches, Nori took over on-court coach duties for the remainder of the playoffs.

Since then, Nori has gained steam as a head coaching candidate, interviewing for both the Lakers' and Knicks' vacant roles.

On June 23, 2026, Nori was hired by the Portland Trail Blazers to serve as the team's new head coach.

== Personal life ==
Nori and his wife Melissa have two kids, Dante and Mia. Dante, a talented baseball outfielder, was invited to play in the MLB High School All-Star Game in 2023, and plays professionally in the Philadelphia Phillies organization. Dante played for Italy in the 2026 World Baseball Classic
