= Northville Public Schools =

School district in Michigan

Address
- 405 W. Main Street. Northville, Michigan, 48167; United States

District information
- Type: Public
- Motto: Tradition of Excellence, A World of Possibilities
- Grades: K–12
- Superintendent: Dr. RJ Webber
- Accreditation: NCA /AdvancED District
- Schools: 10
- Budget: $126,011,669 (2022-2023 expenditures)
- NCES District ID: 2625980

Students and staff
- Students: 7,022 (2024-2025)
- Teachers: 390.88 (on an FTE basis) 2024-2025
- Staff: 870.16 FTE 2024-2025
- Student–teacher ratio: 17.96 (2024-2025)
- Athletic conference: Kensington Lakes - Central Division
- District mascot: Mustangs
- Colors: Orange & Black

Other information
- Website: www.northvilleschools.org

Northville Public Schools (NPS) is a school district headquartered in Northville, Michigan. The district serves Novi Township, Northville, and portions of Novi, Lyon Township, and Salem Township. Some areas are near South Lyon.

The district operates six elementary schools, two middle schools, and one high school.

== Service area ==
Within Wayne County the school serves the county's portion of Northville and most of Northville Township. Within Oakland County the school serves that county's portion of Northville, as well as Novi Township, the southwestern part of the city of Novi, and a southeastern part of Lyon Charter Township. Within Washtenaw County it serves a small part of Salem Township.

== History ==
Hillside Middle School was built in 1959 as the high school. It was replaced by the present high school in 2000, and Hillside became a middle school. It was renovated in 2021.

Around 2005, the district had a constant increase of 300 students per year.

== Demographics ==
The languages other than English most common in the district, as of 2013, were Arabic, Chinese, Gujarati, Hindi, Japanese, Korean, Punjabi, Spanish, Tamil, Telugu, and Urdu.

The languages other than English most common in the district, as of 2012, were Arabic, Chinese, German, Hindi, Japanese, Korean, Punjabi, Spanish, Telugu, and Urdu.

== Schools ==
Schools in Northville
School	Address	Grades	Notes
Amerman Elementary School	847 North Center St., Northville	K-5	Built in 1955
Cooke School	21200 Taft Rd., Northville	PreK-12	Originally Cooke Junior High School, became special education school in 2000.
Hillside Middle School	775 North Center St., Northville	6-8	Built in 1959, became middle school in 2000, renovated in 2021
Meads Mill Middle School	16700 Franklin Rd., Northville	6-8	Built in 1976
Moraine Elementary School	46811 W Eight Mile Rd., Northville	K-5	Built in 1966
Northville High School	45700 Six Mile Rd., Northville	9-12	Opened in 2000
Ridge Wood Elementary School	49775 Six Mile Rd., Northville	K-5	Also houses early childhood education and extended day programs. Built in 2003.
Silver Springs Elementary School	19801 Silver Springs Dr., Northville	K-5	Build in 1975
Thornton Creek Elementary School	46180 Nine Mile Rd., Novi	K-5	Built in 1994
Winchester Elementary School	16141 Winchester Dr., Northville	K-5	Built in 1975
Old Village School	405 N Main St., Northville	n/a	Now houses district administration
