= Northville, Michigan =

- City
- City of Northville
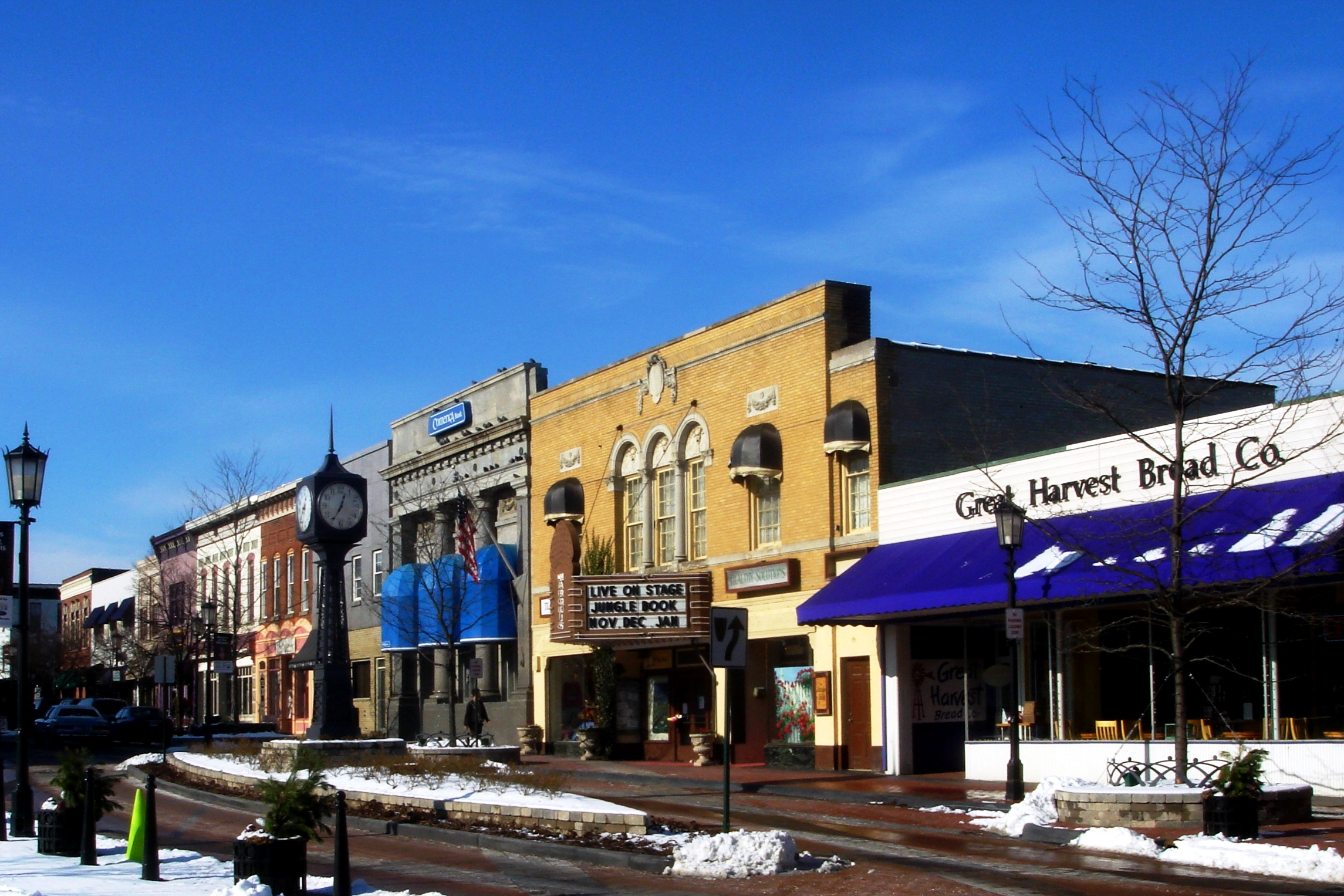
- East Main Street
- Motto: Historically Distinctive
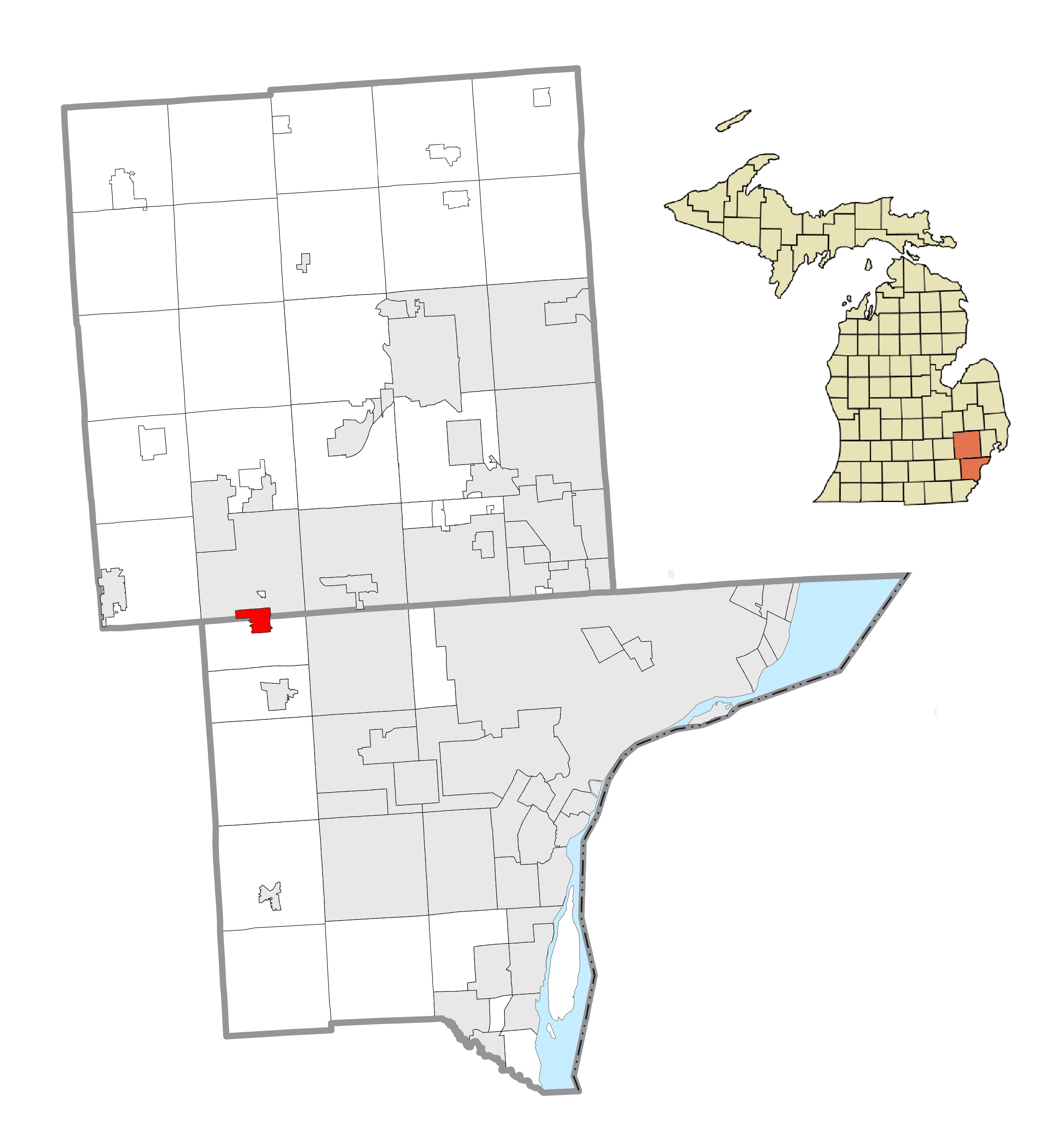
- Location within Oakland County (top) and Wayne County (bottom)

- Location within the state of Michigan Location within the United States
- Coordinates: 42°26′00″N 83°29′00″W
- Country: United States
- State: Michigan
- Counties: Oakland and Wayne
- Settled: 1825
- Incorporated: 1867 (village); 1955 (city)

Government
  - Type: Mayor–council
  - Mayor: Brian Turnbull (D)
  - Manager: George Lahanas

Area
  - City: 2.05 sq mi (5.32 km^{2})
  - Land: 2.04 sq mi (5.28 km^{2})
  - Water: 0.015 sq mi (0.04 km^{2})
- Elevation: 830 ft (253 m)

Population (2020)
  - City: 6,119
  - Density: 3,000.8/sq mi (1,158.62/km^{2})
  - Metro: 4,296,250 (Metro Detroit)
- Time zone: UTC-5 (EST)
  - Summer (DST): UTC-4 (EDT)
- ZIP code(s): 48167, 48168
- Area codes: 248 and 947
- FIPS code: 26-58980
- GNIS feature ID: 0633707
- Website: ci.northville.mi.us

Northville is a city in Wayne and Oakland counties in the U.S. state of Michigan. A western suburb of Detroit, Northville is located roughly 27 miles (43.5 km) northwest of Detroit, and 17 miles (27.4 km) northeast of Ann Arbor. As of the 2020 census, the city had a population of 6,119. It is independent of Northville Township, which it borders to the south.

== History ==
=== Settlement ===
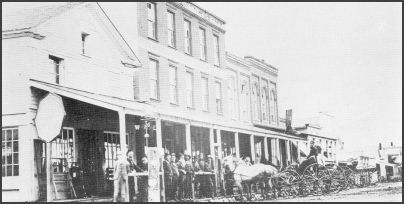
View of NE side of Main St, frame building built in 1830 by John Miller

European Americans first settled Northville in 1825 and was incorporated as a Village in 1867. It was not incorporated as a City until 1955. Originally one of two communities within Plymouth Township, Northville Township split off in 1898 to form its own township.

The first land patent in the Northville area was granted to Gideon Benton in 1823; the current Cass Benton Park is located here. The first settlers did not arrive, however, until 1825. Many of these first settlers were originally from central and western New York State, with ancestors in New England. Others came from the nearby, already settled Plymouth community to Northville.

Among these early settlers were Alanson Aldrich, followed by Alvale Smith, who sold his property to John Miller. Miller built the first mill in Plymouth Township, sometime between 1825 and 1828. Mill Race Historical Village is now preserved at this site. Many employees of the mill began to build their houses near it. Northville was named for its relation north of Plymouth.

In 1827, Northville was home to a post office, and Gideon Benton was the US postmaster. Also in 1827, J.F. Davis, became the first resident doctor in Northville. A tailor, a tavern, a shoe shop, and two blacksmiths also started business in the village. Many of Northville's first settlers' surnames became namesakes for contemporary street names today. These include Rufus Thayer Jr. (Thayer Blvd.), Joseph Yerkes (Yerkes St.), Daniel and Samuel Cady (Cady St.), William Dunlap (Dunlap St.), and other settlers. The first church was constructed in 1836 by a Methodist congregation.

=== Victorian era ===
Northville continued to grow throughout the Victorian era. This is evident in the architecture around downtown where many homes are in the Queen Anne style. Northville's Victorian heritage is celebrated every September in the Victorian Festival, which was recently rechristened the "Heritage Festival".

The first schoolhouse in Northville opened in 1853 and was taught by Jacob Ramsdell. Northville was incorporated as a village in 1867 from a portion of Plymouth Township. By the end of the nineteenth century, it had established a public school system headed by a superintendent.

=== Village era ===
Henry Ford purchased a factory in Northville and moved machinery from plants in the area to the factory in 1919. Known as the Northville Valve Plant, the plant was rebuilt in 1936, and enlarged in 1956. The plant provided valves for every Ford, Mercury, and Lincoln vehicle, except for the Lincoln Continental, until closing and being sold in 1981. The building now houses offices and a health club. In 1925, the Penniman-Allen Theater opened downtown and remained open through the mid-70's. The theater eventually closed, but opened again in 1978 as the Marquis Theater and is now home to live children's theater. When Northville was more rural, skiing was popular and tournaments were held often. In 1944, Northville Downs opened as the first nighttime harness racing track in Michigan. The Downs were built on the site of the former Wayne County Fair, where Joe Louis trained in 1939 for his World Championship later that same year. Northville Downs stayed in continuous operation from 1944 to 2024 and was located at the corner of Center Street and 7 Mile Road.

=== City era ===
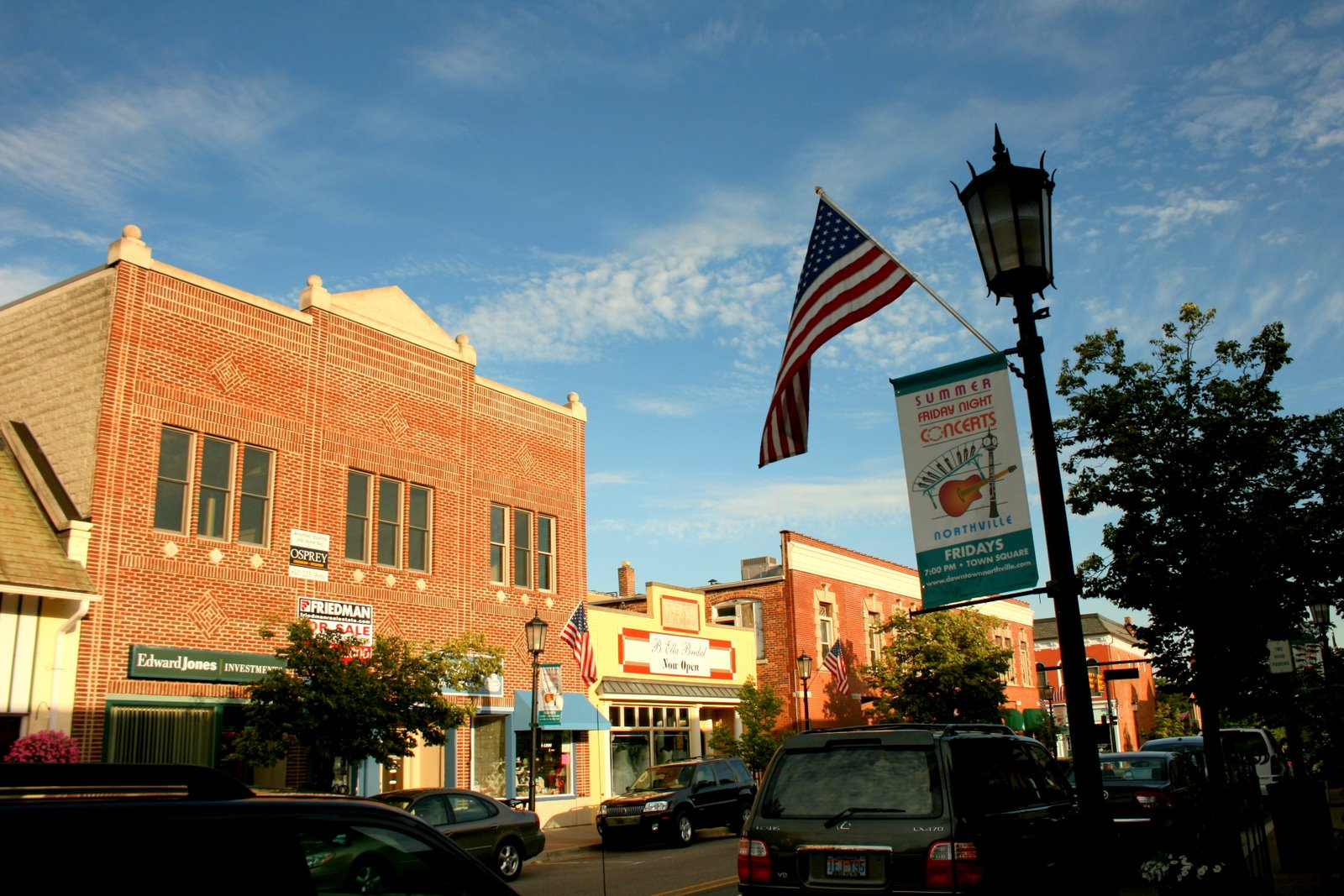
Downtown Northville

The city was incorporated in 1955 along the boundaries of the Village of Northville, and grew rapidly during the prolonged period of white flight from the City of Detroit in the middle and late 20th century. The Village of Northville included portions of Novi Township in Oakland County and Northville Township in Wayne County. Over the next several years, the city boundaries expanded through annexation of portions of Novi Township and the Village of Novi both east and west of the city and north of Baseline Road. The city's northern boundary was fixed by the incorporation of the Village of Novi into the City of Novi in 1969. The city has also annexed small portions of Northville Township, the most recent of which was an expansion of the Rural Hill Cemetery. Northville Township's status as a Charter Township generally precludes the city from annexing any significant portion of the Township. The most recent annexation was permitted by the Township in order for the city to expand the city-owned and operated cemetery.

=== Libraries ===
In 1889, the Ladies Library Association was organized by Mary Lapham, and had 1,200 books and 150 members by 1892. The library was located in the former Young Men's Hall until 1964, when it moved temporarily to the new City Hall. In 1975, the library moved again temporarily to the Northville Square Mall; in 1980 it returned to City Hall. In 1996, it moved into the newly built Northville District Library.

== Geography ==
According to the United States Census Bureau, the city has a total area of 2.06 square miles (5.34 km^{2}), of which 2.04 square miles (5.28 km^{2}) is land and 0.02 square miles (0.05 km^{2}) (0.97%) is water.

The city is divided almost equally between Oakland County to the north and Wayne County to the south. Eight Mile Road (or Baseline Road) serves as the county line. Of the city's 2.06 square miles (5.34 km^{2}) in area and population of 5,970, 1.06 square miles (2.75 km^{2}) (51.4%) and 2,739 residences (45.9%) are within Wayne County. Oakland County contains 1.00 square mile (2.59 km^{2}) of land (48.6%) and 3,231 residents (54.1%).

== Mill Race Village ==
In 1972, the historic Mill Race Village was opened on the site of John Miller's gristmill, made possible by a donation from Ford Motor Company. Historic buildings were colocated here to represent a typical gathering of early buildings and uses. Located on Griswold Avenue, the complex includes the following:

- The New School Church, formerly used as the Northville District Library, which is still operating as a church
- Wash Oak School, built in 1873 and moved to the village in 1975
- Hunter House, a Greek Revival architecture house built in 1849
- Yerkes House, a Victorian architecture house built in 1868 for the wealthy William Yerkes
- A Victorian-style gazebo built in 1979 by Northville High School students
- Cottage House, built in 1890s and now used as the base of a weavers' guild
- Hirsch Blacksmith Shop, a replica built in 1985. The building is occupied by the village's store
- Cady Inn, built in 1832 and documented as a stop on the Underground Railroad for refugee slaves escaping to freedom in Canada. It was moved to the village in 1987.
- Interurban Station, built in 1898 and moved to the village in 1990
- A replica general store
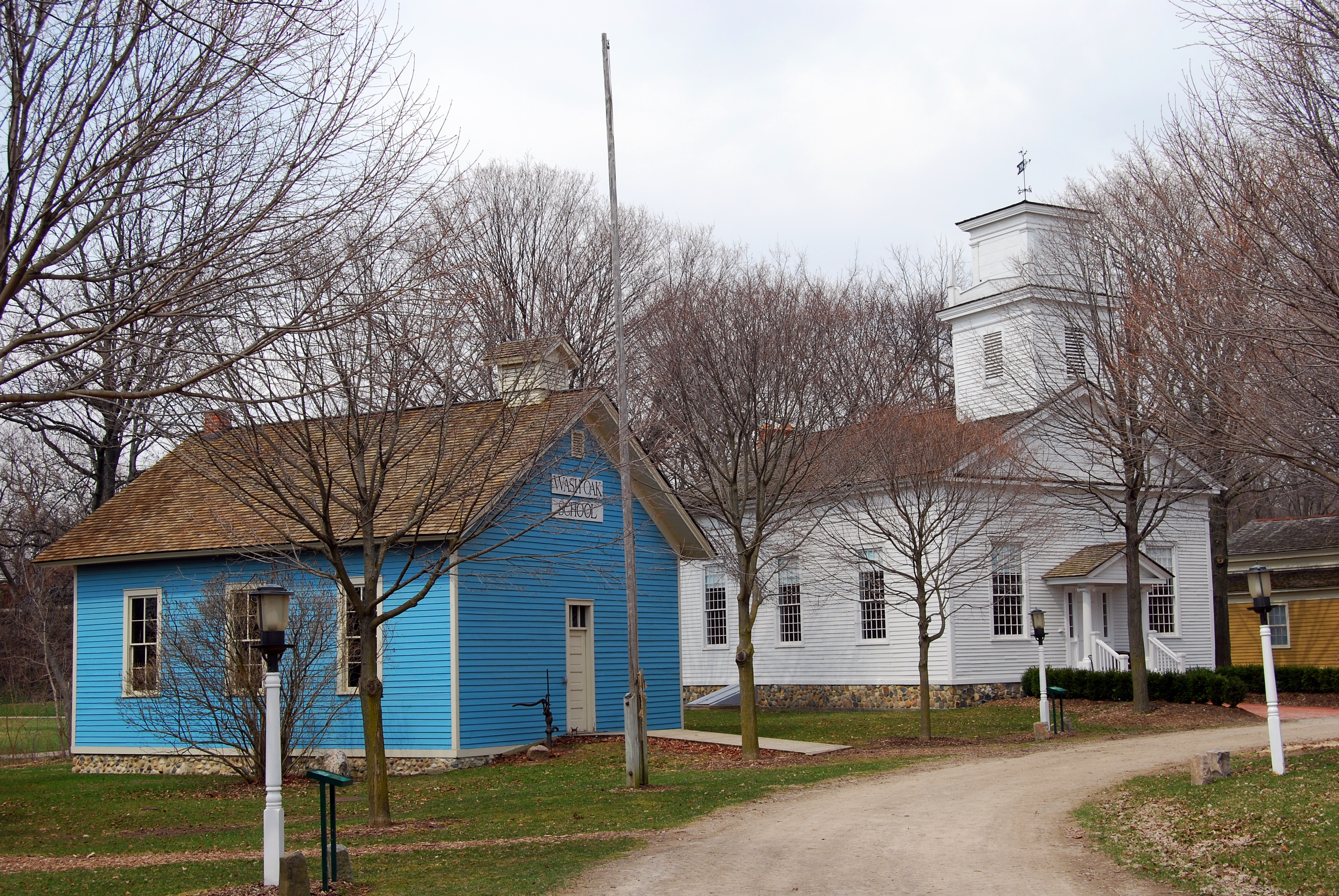
Mill Race Village - Wash Oak School and New School Church

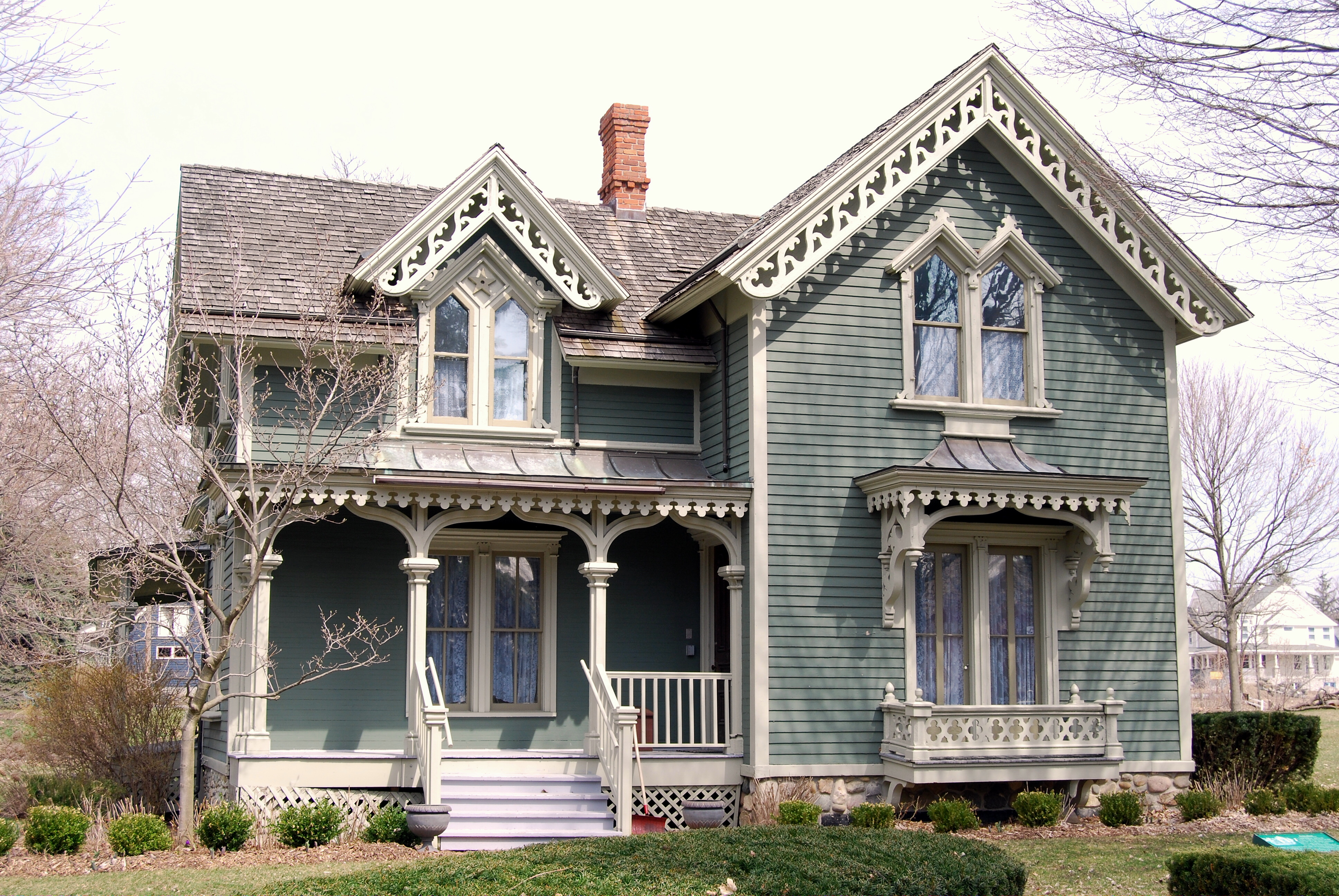
Mill Race Village - Yerkes House

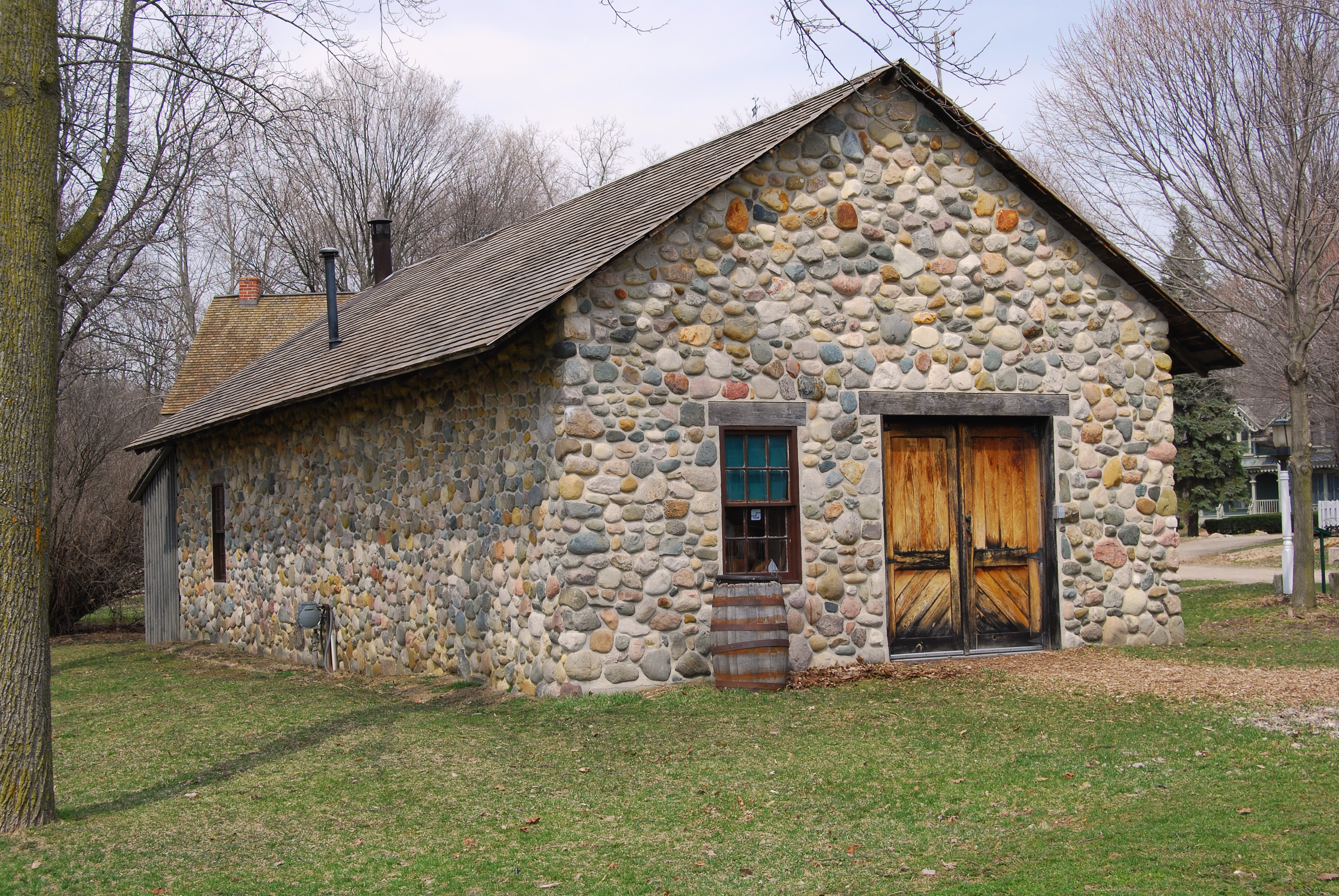
Mill Race Village - blacksmith shop

== Events ==
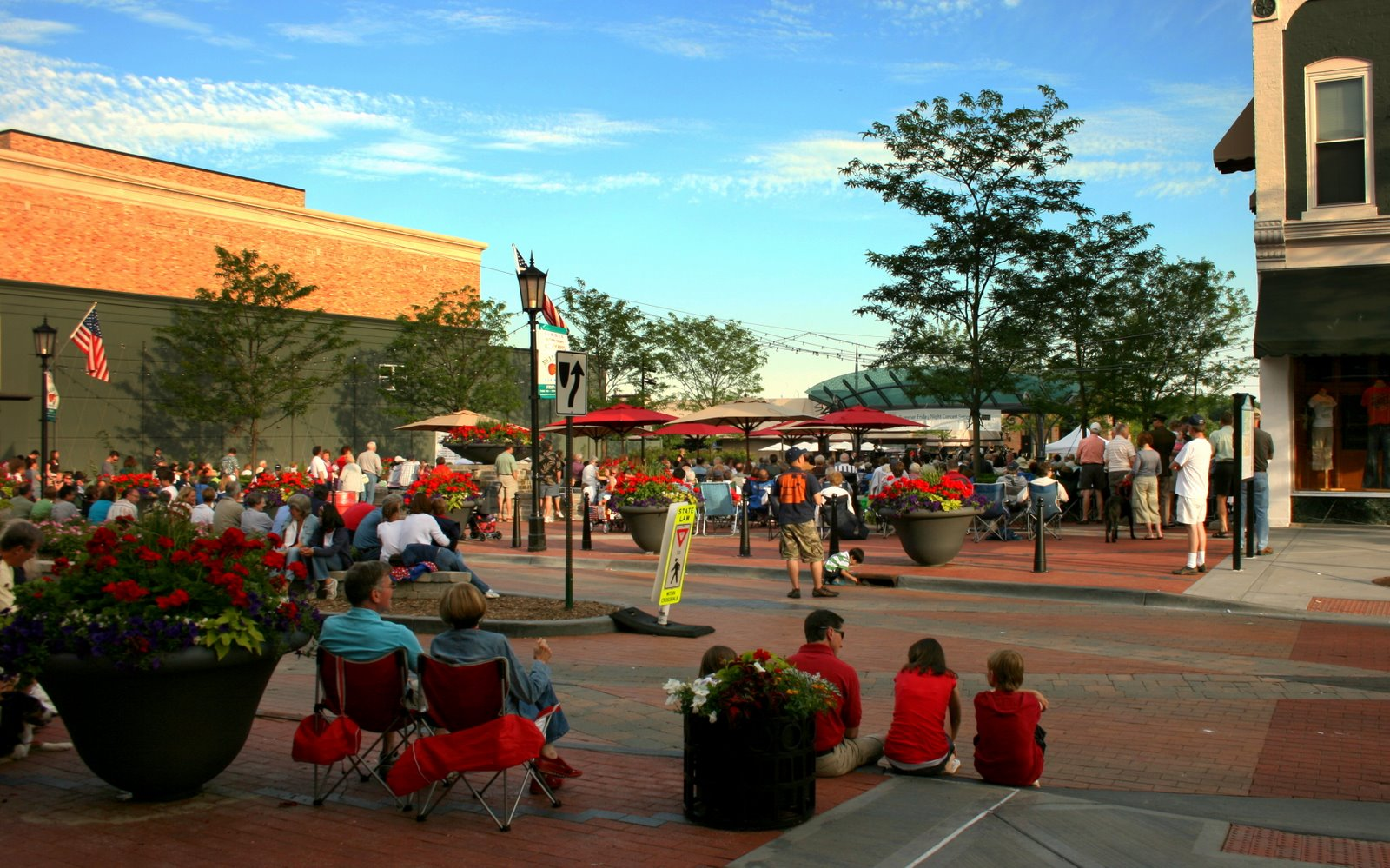
Summer Friday Night Concerts in Town Square

- Art in the Sun - June - Art fair put on by the Northville Art House
- Farmers Market - May through October - Farmers market held each Thursday at temporary location of Highland Lakes Shopping Center, 43039 W. Seven Mile, Northville
- Northville Grub Crawl - July - Ticketholders are shuttled to various area restaurants for samplings of their offerings.
- Heritage Festival (renamed from "Victorian Festival" in 2016) - September - Large event with games, magic shows, music, rides, and art in Downtown Northville where booth operators and parade participants wear traditional Victorian outfits to celebrate the city's heritage, since 1989
- Summer Friday Night Concerts - June to August - Concerts on Friday nights in Town Square, since 1986
- Holiday Lighted Parade - Held on a Friday night in November every year

== Demographics ==
Historical population
Census	Pop.	Note	%±
1860	620		—
1870	626		1.0%
1880	934		49.2%
1890	1,573		68.4%
1900	1,755		11.6%
1910	1,665		−5.1%
1920	1,738		4.4%
1930	2,566		47.6%
1940	3,032		18.2%
1950	3,240		6.9%
1960	3,967		22.4%
1970	5,400		36.1%
1980	5,698		5.5%
1990	6,226		9.3%
2000	6,459		3.7%
2010	5,970		−7.6%
2020	6,119		2.5%
U.S. Decennial Census

=== Racial and ethnic composition ===
Northville city, Michigan – Racial and ethnic composition Note: the US Census treats Hispanic/Latino as an ethnic category. This table excludes Latinos from the racial categories and assigns them to a separate category. Hispanics/Latinos may be of any race.
Race / Ethnicity (NH = Non-Hispanic)	Pop 2000	Pop 2010	Pop 2020	% 2000	% 2010	% 2020
White alone (NH)	6,145	5,498	5,395	95.14%	92.09%	88.17%
Black or African American alone (NH)	24	98	44	0.37%	1.64%	0.72%
Native American or Alaska Native alone (NH)	5	3	7	0.08%	0.05%	0.11%
Asian alone (NH)	118	157	308	1.83%	2.63%	5.03%
Native Hawaiian or Pacific Islander alone (NH)	6	0	6	0.09%	0.00%	0.10%
Other race alone (NH)	8	6	18	0.12%	0.10%	0.29%
Mixed race or Multiracial (NH)	47	75	169	0.73%	1.26%	2.76%
Hispanic or Latino (any race)	106	133	172	1.64%	2.23%	2.81%
Total	6,459	5,970	6,119	100.00%	100.00%	100.00%

=== 2020 census ===
As of the 2020 census, Northville had a population of 6,119. The median age was 47.8 years. 19.1% of residents were under the age of 18 and 21.5% of residents were 65 years of age or older. For every 100 females there were 92.2 males, and for every 100 females age 18 and over there were 90.3 males age 18 and over.

100.0% of residents lived in urban areas, while 0.0% lived in rural areas.

There were 2,622 households in Northville, of which 27.0% had children under the age of 18 living in them. Of all households, 56.1% were married-couple households, 15.4% were households with a male householder and no spouse or partner present, and 25.3% were households with a female householder and no spouse or partner present. About 29.3% of all households were made up of individuals and 13.0% had someone living alone who was 65 years of age or older.

There were 2,783 housing units, of which 5.8% were vacant. The homeowner vacancy rate was 1.1% and the rental vacancy rate was 5.2%.

Racial composition as of the 2020 census
Race	Number	Percent
White	5,434	88.8%
Black or African American	44	0.7%
American Indian and Alaska Native	10	0.2%
Asian	308	5.0%
Native Hawaiian and Other Pacific Islander	7	0.1%
Some other race	37	0.6%
Two or more races	279	4.6%

=== Income and poverty ===
In 2007, the median income for a household in the city was $98,054, and the median income for a family was $123,509. Males had a median income of $75,126 versus $41,343 for females. The per capita income for the city was $43,454. About 1.0% of families and 1.6% of the population were below the poverty line, including 2.2% of those under age 18 and 2.2% of those age 65 or over.

=== 2010 census ===
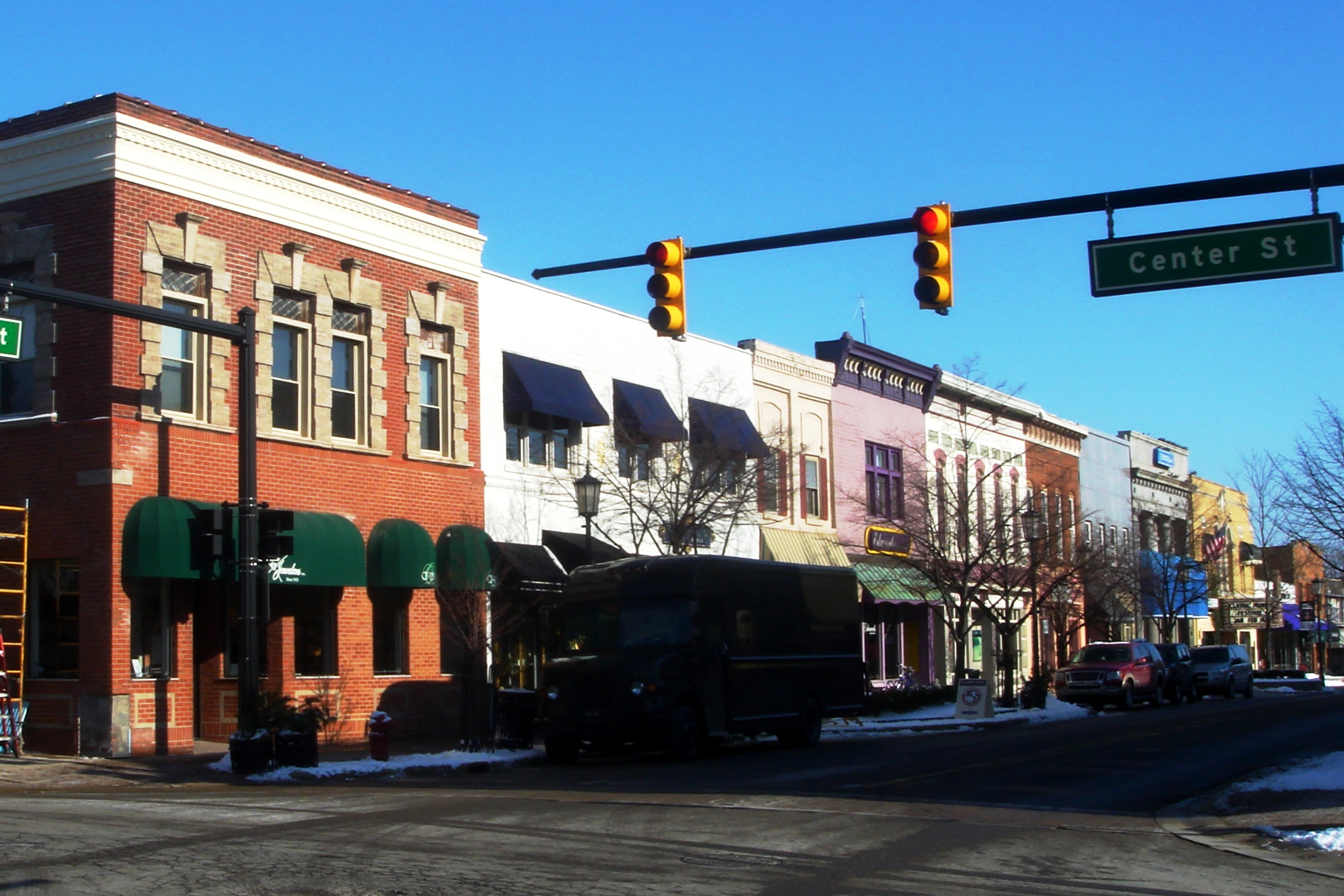
Downtown Northville

As of the census of 2010, there were 5,970 people, 2,596 households, and 1,643 families living in the city. The population density was 2,912.2 inhabitants per square mile (1,124.4/km^{2}). There were 2,767 housing units at an average density of 1,349.8 units per square mile (521.2 units/km^{2}). The racial makeup of the city was 93.7% White, 1.6% African American, 0.1% Native American, 2.6% Asian, 0.6% from other races, and 1.4% from two or more races. Hispanic or Latino residents of any race were 2.2% of the population.

There were 2,596 households, of which 27.7% had children under the age of 18 living with them, 53.8% were married couples living together, 7.4% had a female householder with no husband present, 2.1% had a male householder with no wife present, and 36.7% were non-families. 32.3% of all households were made up of individuals, and 11.4% had someone living alone who was 65 years of age or older. The average household size was 2.29 and the average family size was 2.94.

The median age in the city was 45.3 years. 22% of residents were under the age of 18; 5.5% were between the ages of 18 and 24; 22.1% were from 25 to 44; 34.3% were from 45 to 64; and 16.1% were 65 years of age or older. The gender makeup of the city was 47.9% male and 52.1% female.

=== 2000 census ===
As of the census of 2000, there were 6,459 people, 2,720 households, and 1,795 families living in the city. The population density was 3,239.1 inhabitants per square mile (1,250.6/km^{2}). There were 2,801 housing units at an average density of 1,404.7 units per square mile (542.4 units/km^{2}). The racial makeup of the city was 96.11% White, 0.39% African American, 0.19% Native American, 1.86% Asian, 0.09% Pacific Islander, 0.59% from other races, and 0.77% from two or more races. Hispanic or Latino residents of any race were 1.64% of the population. In more detail, 18.7% were of German, 14.1% were of Irish, 12.3% were of Polish, 10.1% were of English, and 7.4% were of Italian ancestry.

There were 2,720 households, out of which 29.9% had children under the age of 18 living with them, 58.3% were married couples living together, 5.8% had a female householder with no husband present, and 34.0% were non-families. 30.2% of all households were made up of individuals, and 9.7% had someone living alone who was 65 years of age or older. The average household size was 2.36 and the average family size was 2.97.

== Economy ==
Tenneco has its headquarters in Northville Charter Township, in proximity to Northville City.

The largest employment sectors in the city are Manufacturing (663 people), Professional, Scientific, & Technical Services (656 people), and Health Care & Social Assistance (374 people). Other significant areas of employment include management, business/financial operations, and sales-related jobs.

== Education ==
Northville Public Schools is the local school district. Amerman Elementary School and Hillside Middle School are in the Northville city limits. Additionally, portions of Northville are zoned to Moraine Elementary School and Silver Springs Elementary School, both in Northville Township. Additionally some sections of Northville are zoned to Meads Mill Middle School in Northville Township. Northville High School in Northville Township is the zoned high school for all of the Northville District.

Our Lady of Victory School, a Catholic K-8 school, is in Northville. The church established the school in 1950. The first facility, which opened in 1952, had four rooms. An addition with four classrooms and an office was installed for $85,000 (~$681,086 in 2024) in 1961. An additional two classrooms and a connecting structure to the worship facility were added in 1985. The current 19 classroom facility opened in 2006. As of 2020 the school has over 450 students. Catholic schools are under the Roman Catholic Archdiocese of Detroit.

St. Paul's Lutheran School, a Lutheran K-8 school, is also in Northville. The affiliated church, founded in 1896 by Rev. John J Goulding, had established, dis-established, and then, in 1959, re-established the school. After 1959 it was initially in a building with two rooms. Its current facility has ten rooms.

== Religion ==
Our Lady of Victory Catholic Church originated when a priest came to give mass on May 25, 1887. The first church site was acquired in 1905, and a frame building occupied the site. The Northville and Plymouth parishes split in 1922. A $226,000 (~$1.99 million in 2024) church facility opened in the fall of 1956. In 1961 an addition worth $35,000 (~$280,447 in 2024) was put in the convent. Another rectory was installed in the period from 1967 through 1968. The city limits also include First United Methodist Church, St. Paul Lutheran Church, First Baptist Church, and First Presbyterian Church.

== Notable people ==
- Mike Babcock - former head coach of the Detroit Red Wings
- Cooper Barnes - actor raised in Northville
- Mary Barra - CEO of General Motors
- Martha E. Cram Bates (1839–1905) - writer, journalist, newspaper editor
- Gunnar Birkerts (1925–2017) - architect
- Dré Bly - NFL cornerback
- Daunte Culpepper - NFL quarterback, Detroit Lions
- Jennifer Granholm - governor of Michigan, lived in Northville prior to being elected and moving to Lansing.
- Mike Henneman - lived in Northville while he was an MLB pitcher for the Detroit Tigers in the late 1980s and early 1990s
- Calvin Johnson - NFL wide receiver, Detroit Lions
- Jon Kitna - NFL quarterback
- Nicklas Lidström - NHL player, lived in Northville while playing for the Red Wings
- Don Massey (1928–2011) - car dealer
- Ronna Romney McDaniel - chair of the Republican National Committee from 2017 to 2024
- Joe Messina - Motown guitarist, part of The Funk Brothers (1928–2024)
- Daniel Milstein - CEO of Gold Star Mortgage Financial Group
- Jason Robertson - NHL player
- Nick Robertson - NHL player
- Jack Roush - CEO of Roush Industries, NASCAR team owner
- Larry Santos - singer, actor and composer
- Scot Shields - MLB pitcher
- Drew Stanton - NFL quarterback
- Pete Stoyanovich - NFL kicker, Miami Dolphins
- Amy Yakima - winner of So You Think You Can Dance Season 10
- Greg Zuerlein - professional figure skater
