= The Eleanor Association =

Eleanor Club One, the Eleanor Association's building in Hyde Park

The Eleanor Association, now the Eleanor Women's Foundation, was a non-profit housing and community program for working women in Chicago, founded in 1906.

== Founding and early years ==
Former teacher Ina Law Robertson founded the Hotel Eleanor in 1898 as dormitory-style room and board for working women in Chicago's Hyde Park neighborhood. They were named for her friend and benefactor, Eleanor Law.

The project grew into the Eleanor Association, encompassing other buildings in the city, to assist thousands of women. The residences had communal dining, libraries, reading rooms, basic banking services, clubs and classes. Camp Eleanor, a summer retreat in Lake Geneva, Wisconsin, was added the association's programs, as was a club publication, The Eleanor Record. The association was incorporated in 1906, and a downtown headquarters was added in 1907. The concept was held up as an example for women's clubs in other cities. Robertson died in 1916.

== After 1916 ==
There were six Eleanor residences at the association's height. The camp in Wisconsin closed in 1953. Eleanor Club One in Hyde Park was bought by the University of Chicago in 1967, and was a dormitory until 2015. The building in Wicker Park became a nursing home; other sites became a youth hostel, and office/retail space. The Dearborn Parkway residence operated as housing until 2001. "It really helped not to have to worry about cooking, cleaning, or security," one former resident recalled of her time there in the 1990s.

The Eleanor Women's Foundation now is part of the Chicago Foundation for Women, and continues to offer community supports for women and girls in Chicago. There is a collection of the foundation's papers in the Women and Leadership Archives at Loyola University Chicago.
