= Valerie Gerrard Browne =

American archivist

Valerie Gerrard Browne is an archivist. She has served with many institutions and has focused on collections of women. She is the daughter-in-law of artist Archibald Motley, Jr. (1891–1981) and serves as the caretaker of his legacy.

== Education and personal life ==
She attended Milford High School in Milford, Michigan and graduated in 1958. She graduated from the University of Michigan in 1962. She later studied Archival Management at Wayne State University. She currently resides in Charleston, South Carolina but splits her time in Chicago.

Browne married Archibald Motley III, the son of painter Archibald Motley, Jr., and had one daughter, Mara. Her husband died in 2002.

== Career ==
In the early 1970s, Browne began her archival career at Wayne State University in the archives of labor and urban affairs. She served as archivist for Walter P. Reuther, the leader of the United Auto Workers labor union. Here, she met her husband for the first time and decided to marry within a month. She met the artist, Motley, only once when she traveled to Chicago to tell him she would marry his son and take care of Motley in his failing health. He died a few weeks later.

Browne and Motley both favored the painting "Portrait of My Grandmother", which is a "beautiful, dignified, loving" portrait of a formerly enslaved woman. The Motley paintings are often loaned to many museums and institutions including the National Gallery of Art. Browne has traveled the country to attend openings and events to promote Motley's works as well as view the exhibits.

On taking over the legacy of Archibald Motley after her husband's death, Browne said: “I never dreamed this would become my responsibility. I care deeply about my father-in-law’s art and take the responsibility that fell to me very seriously, seeking to do what I hope Archie and his dad would have wanted… I am very sensitive to being a white woman in charge of the art legacy of a very important black artist."

The Archibald J. Motley, Jr. papers and photographs collection was gifted to the Chicago History Museum by Browne in 2013.

In the early 1980s, Browne served as an archivist at Loyola University Chicago where she remained for over 20 years. Browne served as the first director of the Women and Leadership Archives at Loyola University Chicago from 1994 to 2004.

Her work in archives is notable for her dedication to materials and collections related to women. In her nomination for the Society of American Archivists Fellowship, several colleagues noted her generosity and joy "that has been a source of inspiration for other archivists".

=== Awards ===
- In 2001, Browne was awarded the Society of American Archivists Fellowship, which is the Society's highest honor.

=== Publications ===
- She wrote the foreword to Bridges of Memory Volume 2: Chicago's Second Generation of Black Migration by Timuel Black.
- Author of award-winning Guide to the State Archives of Michigan, 1977

=== Affiliations ===
- Midwest Archives Conference: Emeritus member, member or chair of committees, council member, vice president, and president (1991-1993).
- Society of American Archivists: member or chair of committees (Committee on the Status of Women, Women's Caucus, Women Archivists Roundtable), Nominating Council, Fellow.
- Michigan Archival Association: program committee.
