= Housing at the University of Chicago =

Student residential facilities

Housing at the University of Chicago includes seven residence halls that are divided into 48 houses. Each house has an average of 70 students. Freshmen and sophomores must live on-campus. Limited on-campus housing is available to juniors and seniors. The university operates 28 apartment buildings near campus for graduate students.

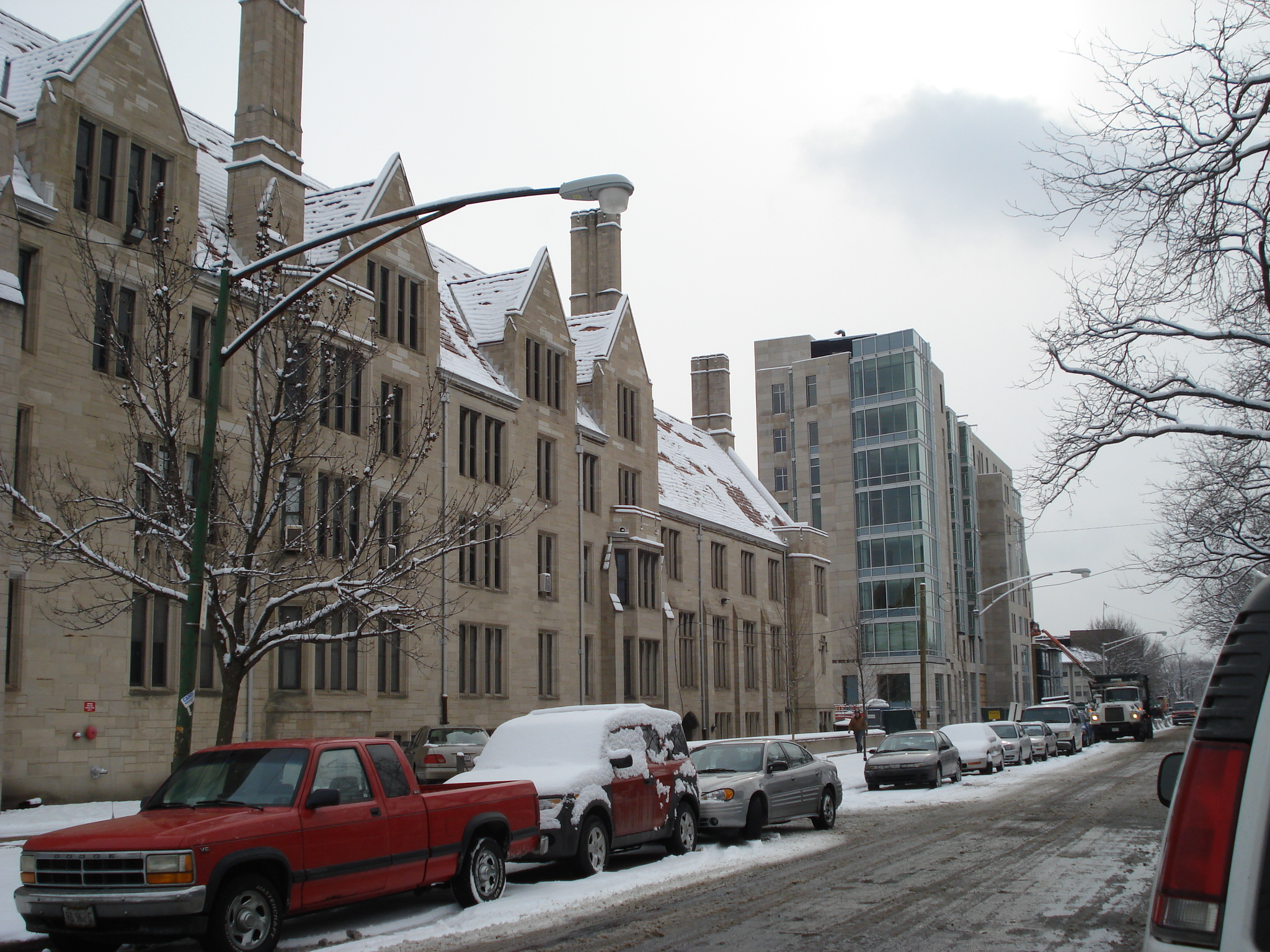
Burton-Judson Courts and Renee Granville-Grossman Residential Commons

In 2014, 54% of undergraduates lived in college-owned housing.

== History ==
Gates-Blake and Goodspeed Halls opened in 1892 as the first residence halls for the University of Chicago. The buildings were designed by Henry Ives Cobb and served as dormitories for divinity school and graduate students. The buildings feature oriels along their facades and gables along the roof line that are signs of the Chicago Gothic architecture.

The first women's dorm, Foster Hall, opened in 1893. It was converted to offices in 1961–62.

== Residence halls ==
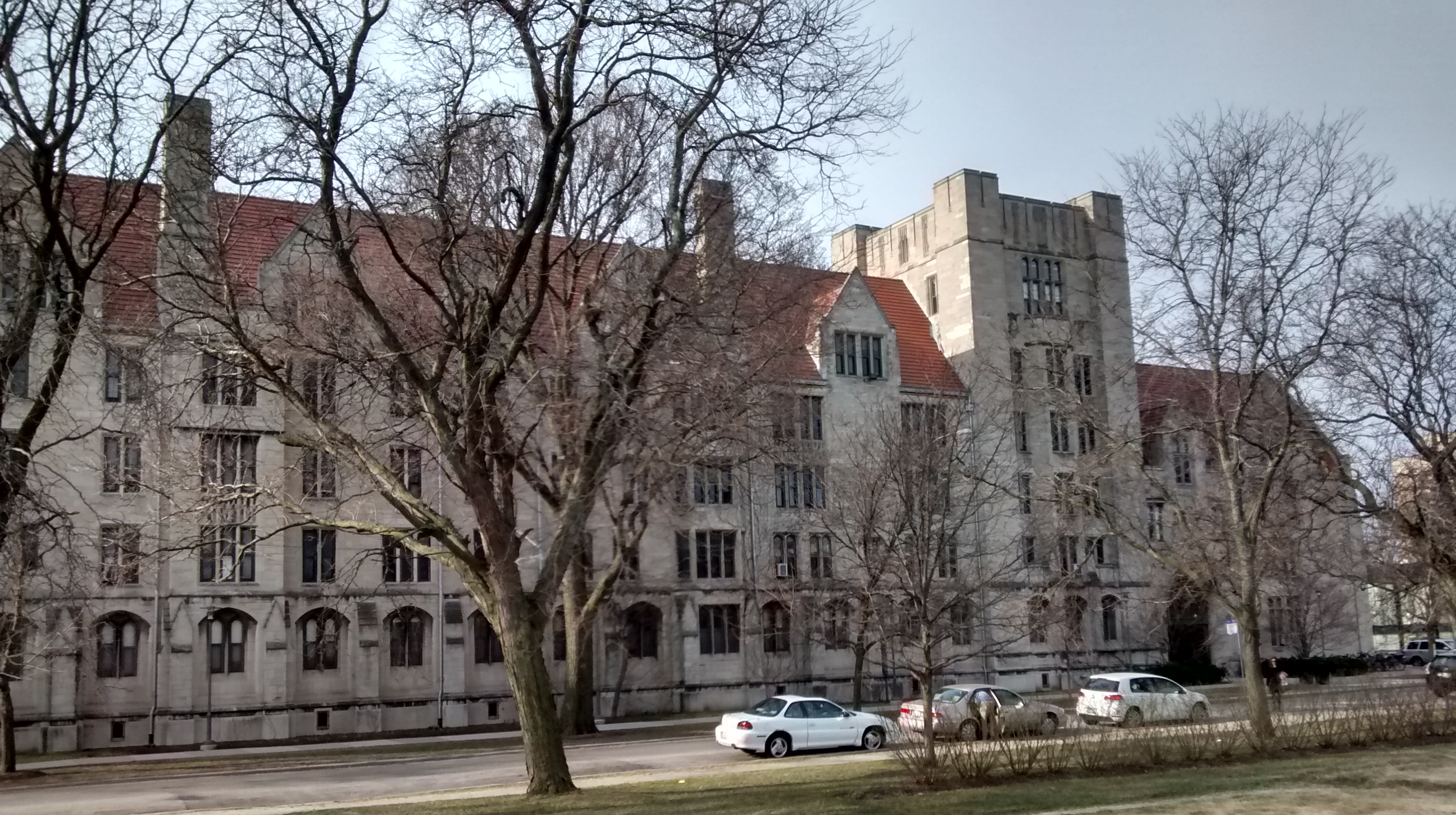
Burton-Judson Courts

=== Burton–Judson Courts ===
Burton–Judson Courts, often known as "BJ", is located at 1005 E. 60th St. and accommodates 320 students. Located south of the Midway Plaisance, Burton-Judson is a castle-like edifice built in a neo-Gothic style similar to that of the university's main quadrangles. It was designed by the Philadelphia firm of Zantzinger, Borie, and Medary. Burton-Judson was the first on-campus residence of eminent astronomer Carl Sagan, who lived in room 141 (See "Carl Sagan, A Life"). Burton-Judson contains six houses: Linn-Mathews, Salisbury, Chamberlin, Vincent, Coulter and Dodd-Mead.

=== Campus North Residential Commons ===
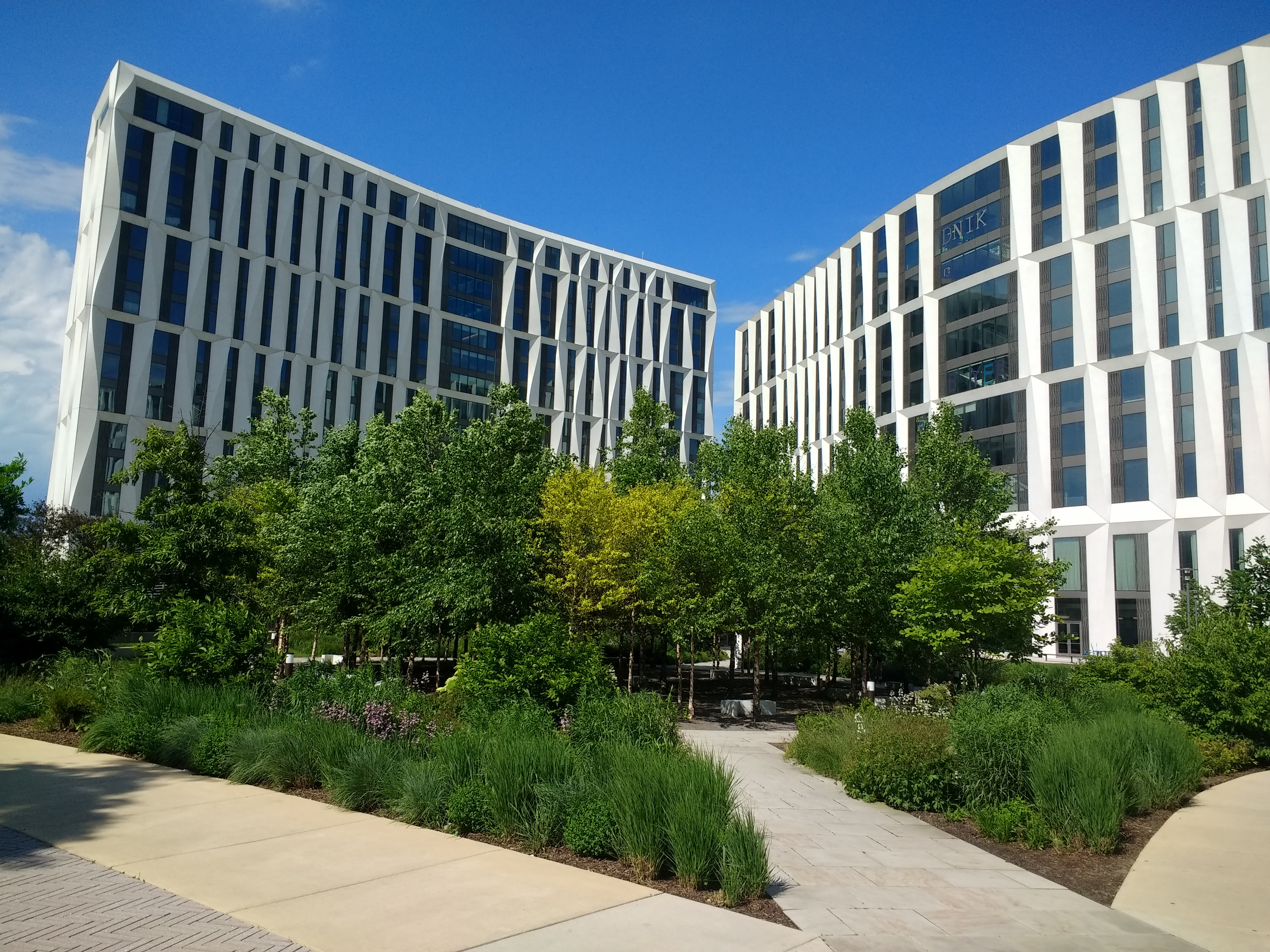
Campus North Residential Commons

Campus North, often known simply as "North", occupies the previous location of Pierce Tower, and was built from 2013 to 2016. With 15 floors, it has room to accommodate about 800 students and includes a dining hall. The hall contains 8 houses, all of which were formerly located in Broadview, Maclean, New Grad, and Blackstone halls and renamed upon relocation to Campus North. The building is one of Studio Gang Architects many recent contracts in and around the university. In 2018, the completed project was recognized for excellence by the American Institute of Architects, Chicago chapter.

=== International House ===
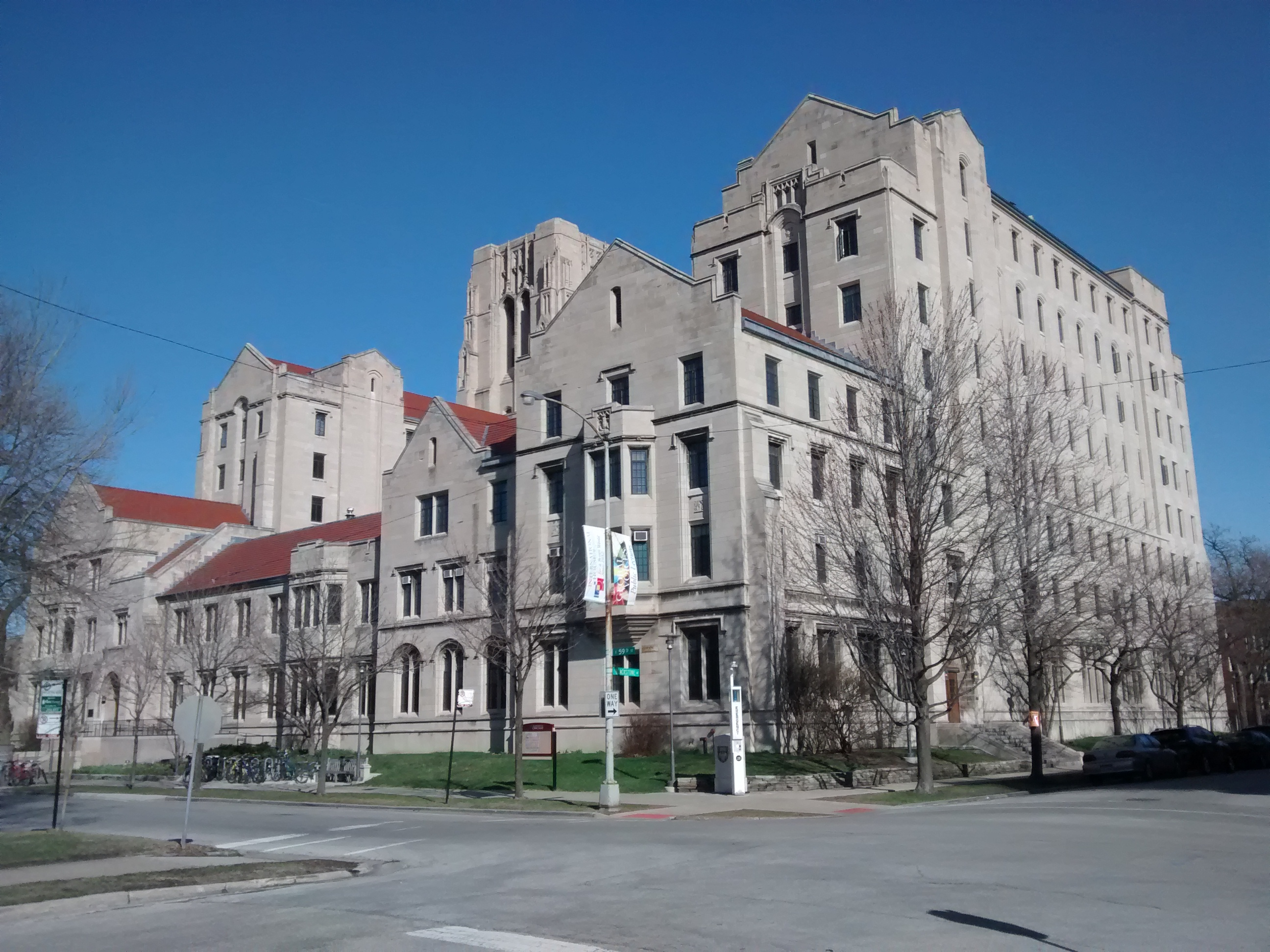
International House

The International House historically has housed undergraduate, graduate, and professional students. International House is colloquially known by students as "I-House." Facing the Midway Plaisance, it was created in 1932 as a gift from John D. Rockefeller Jr. specifically to foster relationships between students from different countries. It is notable for having housed many famous artists, scientists, and scholars connected with the university, including Langston Hughes and Enrico Fermi. It hosts many cultural events including dance and musical performances from around the world. Some 40,000 people have lived there since it first opened its doors. I-House Chicago is a member of International Houses Worldwide.

An attempt in early 2000 by the University of Chicago administration to close the International House and convert it into a dormitory for the Business School resulted in large student protests and a class-action lawsuit against the university by International House residents. After months of negative media attention and intense public criticism by faculty, alumni, and local activists, the administration finally reversed its decision and allowed the International House to remain open. The International House subsequently embarked on a $30 million renovation project.

Until autumn 2013, undergraduates lived in two houses located in the East Tower of International House, Booth and Phoenix. In autumn 2013, Thompson House and Shorey House moved to the West Tower of International House, due to Pierce Tower's closing.

In early 2016, the university announced that it would reserve International House's rooms entirely for undergraduate residents, and that it would no longer house international exchange students or graduate students for an indeterminate amount of time. Breckinridge House, which had previously been planned to be moved to North Campus and given a different name, was relocated to the areas of International House where the last graduate students had resided, and did not have its name changed.

=== Max Palevsky Residential Commons ===
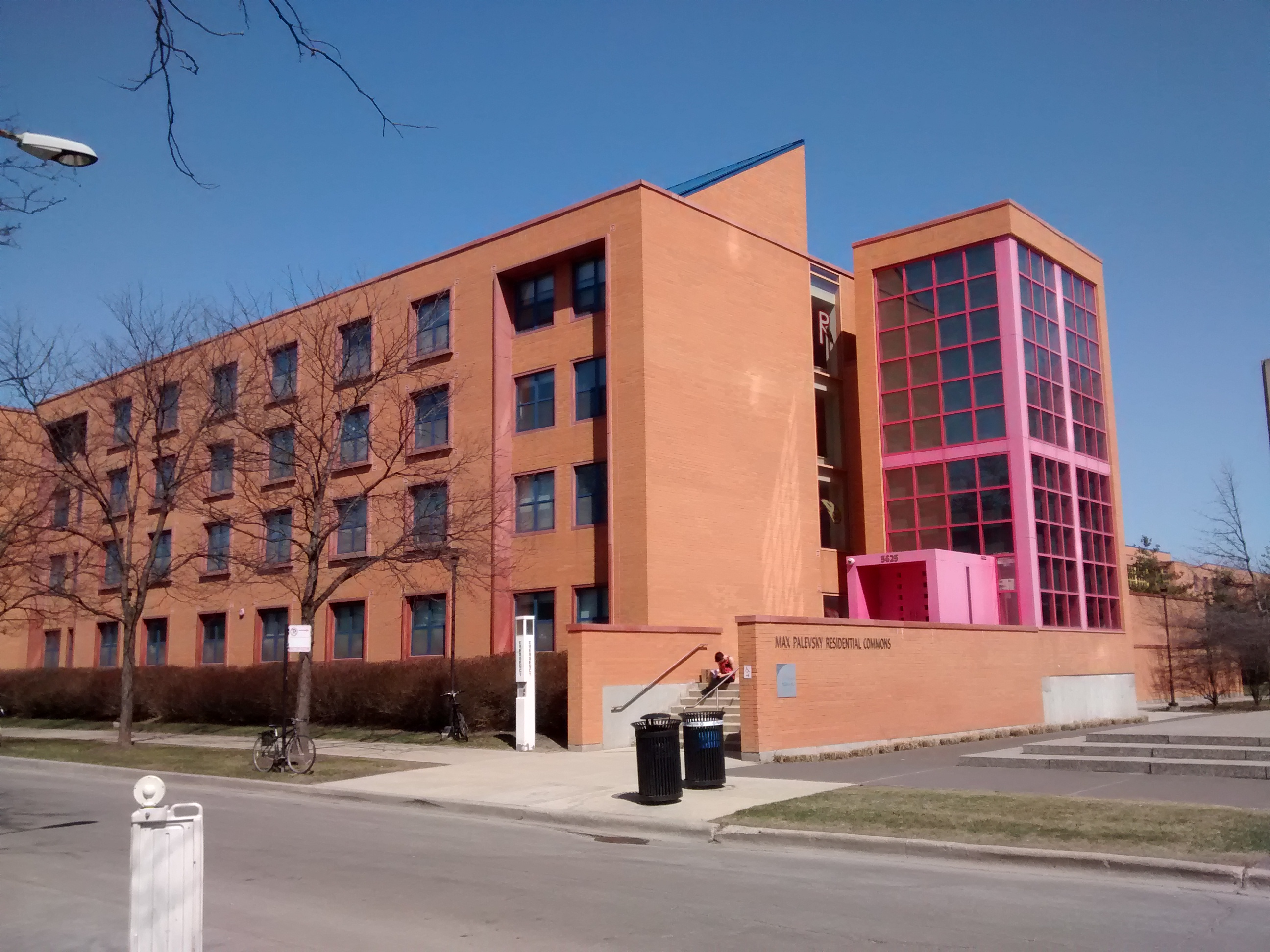
Max Palevsky Residential Commons

The Max Palevsky Residential Commons, often known as "Max P" or simply "Max" is located at 1101 E. 56th St. and accommodates 712 people. The buildings were designed by Mexican architect Ricardo Legorreta, and opened in 2001. Dining is provided in the Bartlett Commons. Three buildings constitute the Commons, sharing a common basement, while students are assigned to one of eight houses (in-dorm communities) spread amongst the buildings: Alper, Hoover, and May Houses in Max Palevsky East; Flint, Graham, and Woodward Houses in Max Palevsky Central; and Rickert and Wallace Houses in Max Palevsky West. All houses are co-ed, although Hoover maintains single-sex floors.

The buildings' name recognizes alumnus Max Palevsky, who had donated $20 million to the university "to enhance the quality of residential life on campus." Blair Kamin, a Chicago Tribune architectural critic, wrote after their 2002 opening that the buildings "...just [don't] come off." Subsequent architectural criticism has been more favorable, finding that the buildings' layout meets the needs of the modern student body and that their colors and windows echo those of their neighbors.

=== Renee Granville-Grossman Residential Commons ===
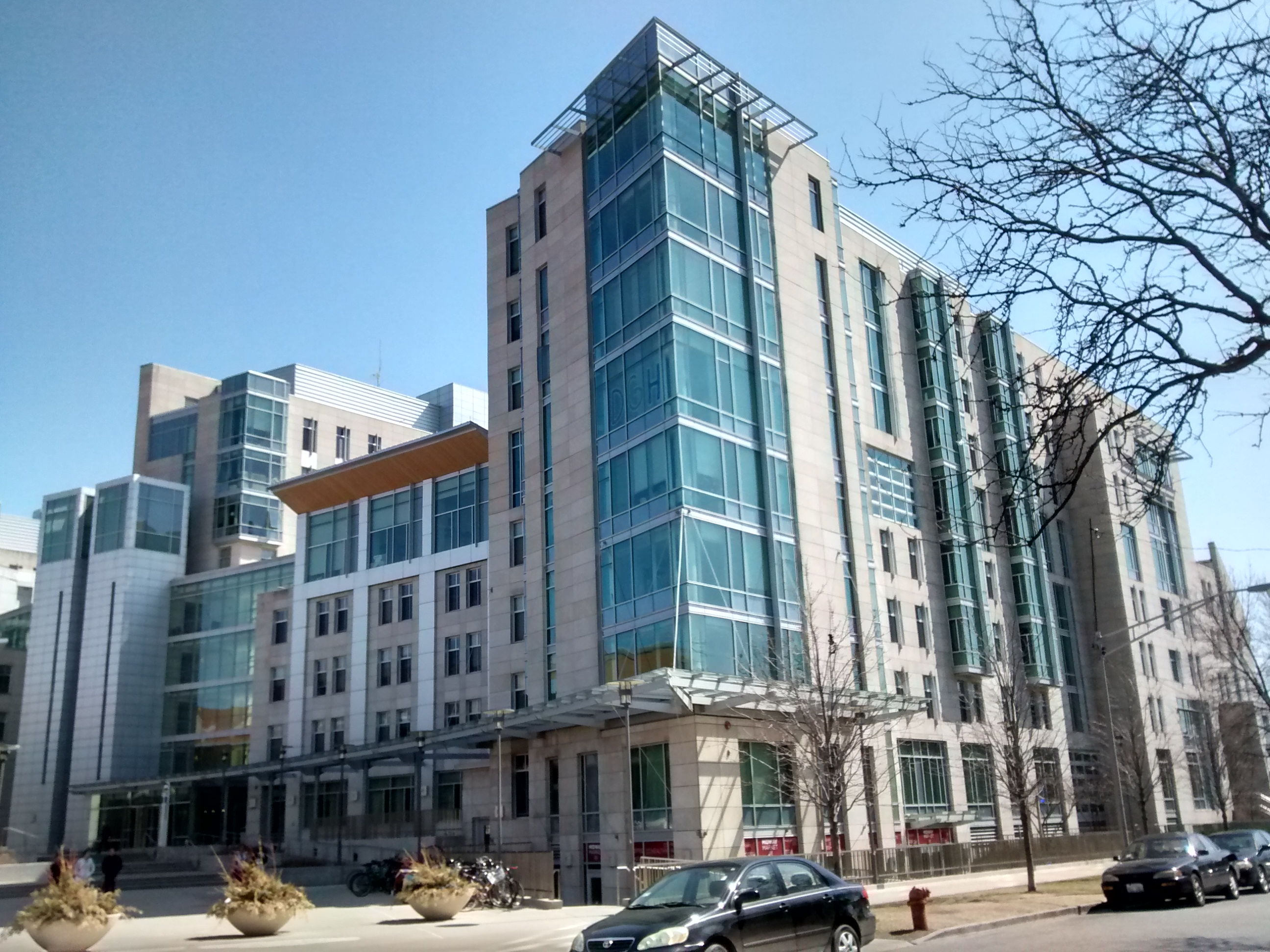
Renee Granville-Grossman Residential Commons

The Renee Granville-Grossman Residential Commons, often referred to as "Renee" or "South" due to its relative location from the main quad of campus, is located in Woodlawn, south of the Midway Plaisance at 6031 S. Ellis Ave. and accommodates 811 residents. Named South Campus Residence Hall when opened in 2009, the dorm was rededicated as the Renee Granville-Grossman Residential Commons in February 2015 after a $44 million donation to the university. It is split into two sections, East and West, defined by a courtyard for each. The dorm contains eight college houses. RGGRC West contains houses Keller, Halperin, Kenwood, and DelGiorno, while RGGRC East contains Jannotta, Cathey, Crown, and Wendt. Dining is provided in the Arley D. Cathey Dining Commons.

=== Snell–Hitchcock Hall ===
Snell-Hitchcock Hall, often referred to as "Snitchcock", is located at 1009 E. 57th St., on the main campus quad, and houses 156 residents in two houses. Formally Amos Jerome Snell Hall and Charles Hitchcock Hall, more commonly known as Snell–Hitchcock or Hitchcock–Snell, was built in 1892 (Snell) and 1901 (Hitchcock). They are the oldest residence halls still in use as such on campus. Snell is built in a collegiate-Gothic style, while Hitchcock is Prairie Style inspired Gothic. The buildings both feature limestone exteriors and fireplaces, hardwood molding and trim.

Snell–Hitchcock is known for having a high level of community spirit and involvement, which is best seen at the annual University of Chicago Scavenger Hunt. Also known as Scav Hunt or simply "Scav", it marks the high point of the year for many of the inhabitants of the two dorms; as of 2012, the Snell–Hitchcock team had won 13 of the 26 hunts to date. The dorm is on the northwest corner of the university's Main Quadrangles at the corner of 57th St. and Ellis Avenue. It is connected via emergency exits to Searle Chemistry Laboratory.

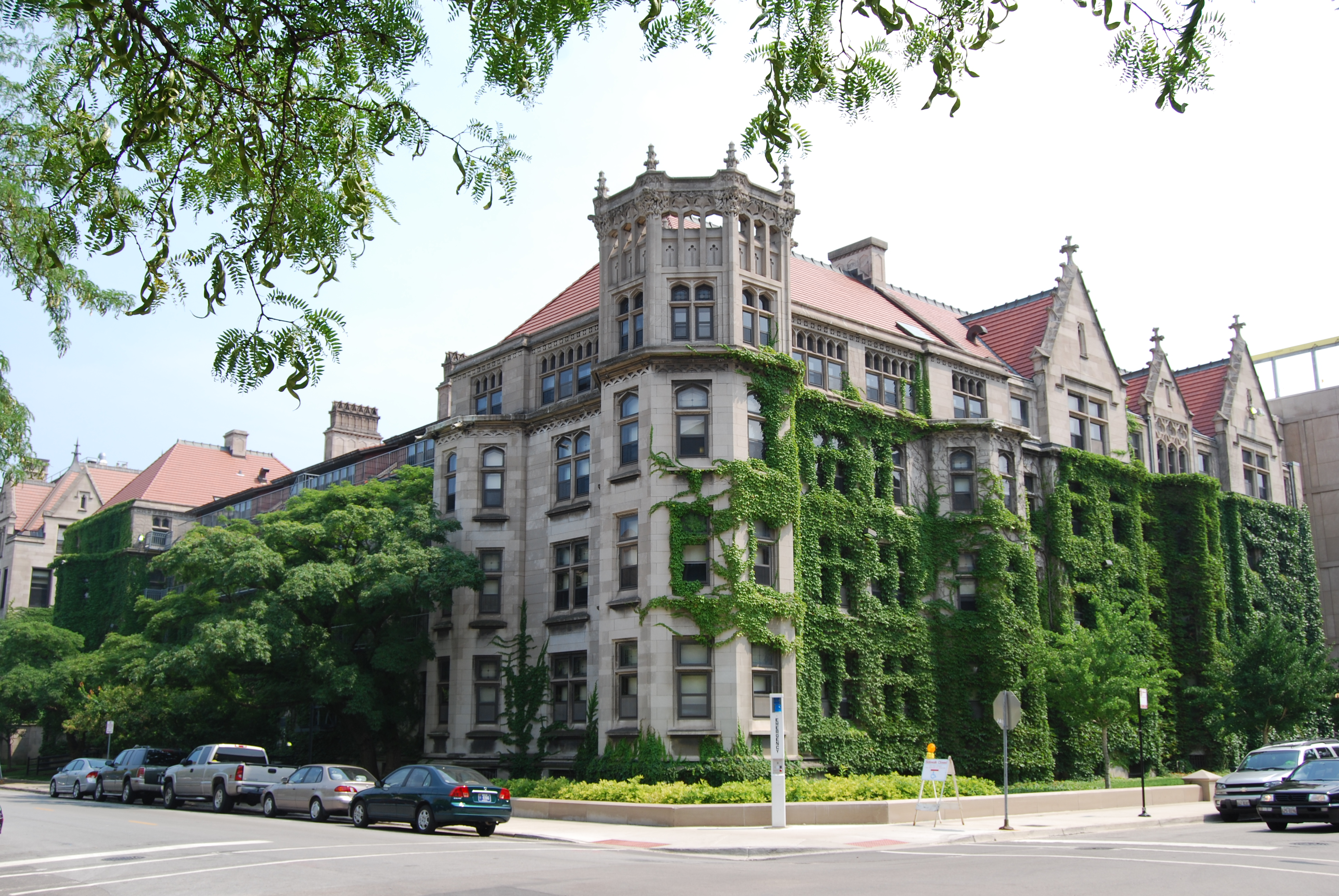
Snell–Hitchcock Hall

Hitchcock was built in 1901, and is listed in the National Register of Historic Places. It is built in a collegiate Gothic style, like Snell and most of the University of Chicago's campus, but has many Prairie School elements, such as stone corn husks instead of gargoyles and flat-roofed instead of gabled dormers.

Hitchcock is built in the European "landing" style of dormitory with five stairwells linked through the front cloister and basement, though only the basement is used now to ensure that the building is more secure. The three interior "sections" (Sections II-IV) are each built around a single staircase. Each interior Section consists of two floors of four double-rooms with a fourth floor that has two suites (doubles with a large living room and separate bedroom). Most of the rooms have non-working fireplaces. The first floor houses the apartment for the Resident Deans, a live-in faculty couple. Traditionally, each section has had a women-only and a men-only floor, with the suite floor being either single or mixed-sex depending on the desires of the residents.

=== Woodlawn Residential Commons ===
Woodlawn Residential Commons, commonly referred to as "Woodlawn", is located at 1156 East 61st Street, south of the Midway Plaisance, and is the largest student dormitory on campus, built to accommodate approximately 1,300 students. It is notable for not being owned by the university itself, instead being financed by Capstone Development Partners and Harrison Street Real Estate Capital and constructed by Turner Construction, though the day-to-day management of the facility is managed by the University Housing and Residence Life staff. The dormitory was designed by Elkus Manfredi Architects. The dormitory is 15 stories tall, and includes 11 houses and a dining hall. Baker, Casner, Fama, Gallo, Rustandy, and Yovovich Houses are located in the East community of Woodlawn, while Chenn, Eka, Han, Liew, and Markovitz Houses are located in the West community.

== Former halls ==
=== Blackstone Hall ===
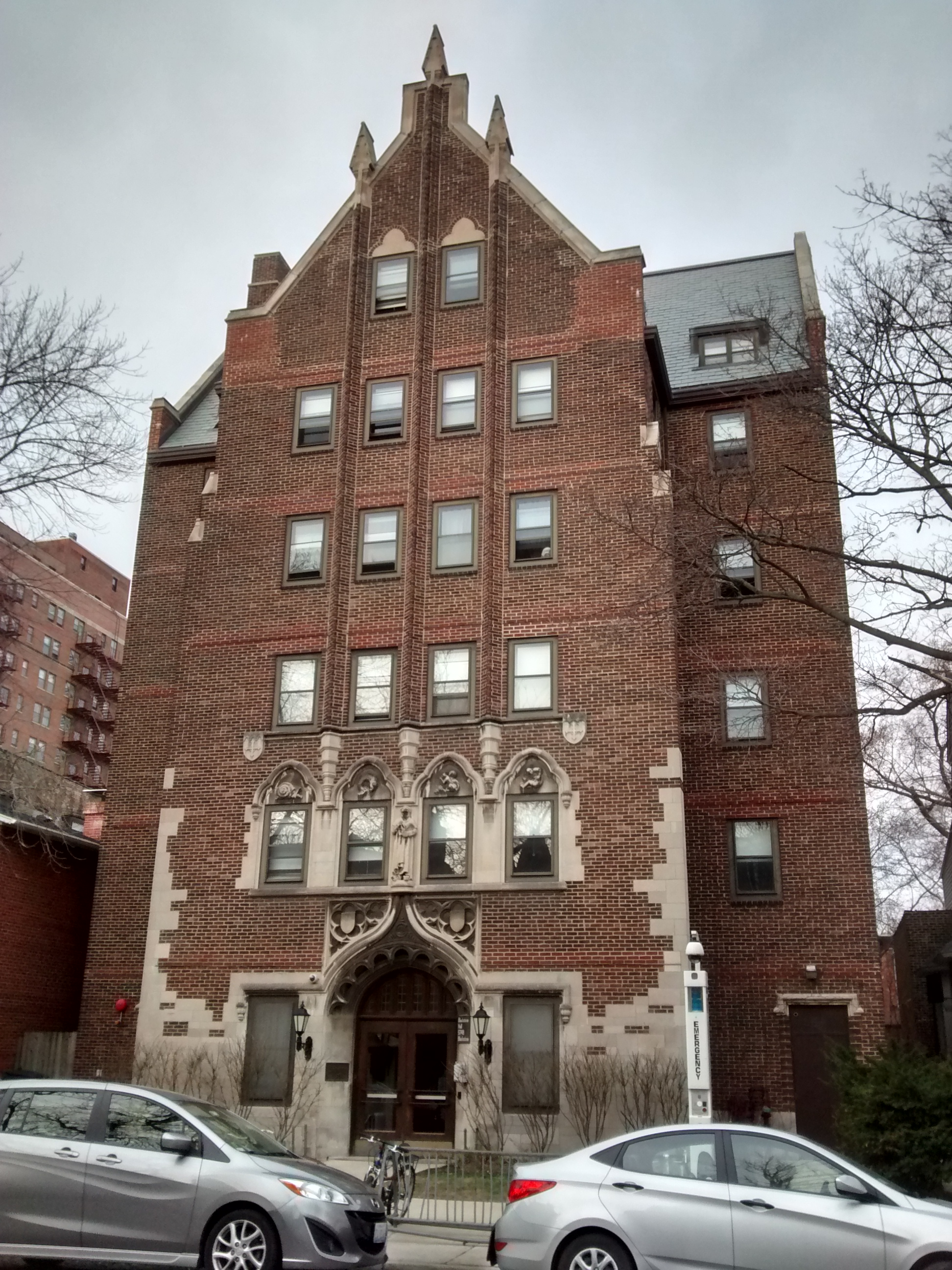
Blackstone Hall

Blackstone Hall, located at 5748 S. Blackstone Avenue, accommodated 79 residents. There was only one college house in Blackstone Hall, called Blackstone House. The main campus quadrangles were approximately a ten-minute walk away. The six-story building contained several lounges, a computer lab, a solarium, a fireplace, and a piano. Students resided in "half-double apartments," in which each pair of single rooms contains a shared kitchenette and bathroom. The average room was sized 12 by 12.5 feet.

Blackstone Hall was designed by architect Ralph D. Huszagh, and construction was completed in 1930. At the end of 1953, the university had purchased the building for use as a nurses' residence. The residents who had lived there for several years were reluctant to leave, but for the university a more pressing matter left them with no alternative. A shortage of nurses had led to a "most critical situation" in the university's expanding medical system, and the university could not acquire the badly needed nurses without additional housing.

The university issued termination notices to all Blackstone residents in March 1954. Remodeling of the entire interior of the building began shortly after the tenants had left. The rooms were initially constructed as hotel rooms, so the university formed apartments by connecting pairs of rooms with shared baths and kitchens. Despite the apparent urgency in Blackstone's transformation into nursing accommodations, by the end of 1954 the university continued to have difficulties with filling vacancies in the building. Blackstone was abandoned as a nurses' residence, since very few nurses had lived there. Despite efforts by the housing office to fill the rooms with students, there were still vacancies for 25 student couples or 50 single women.

The Housing Bureau made the rooms available for immediate occupancy at $70–75 per month ($591–634 per month in 2012 dollars), including all utilities except phone service. Laundry machines were provided in the building's utility room. The rooms were advertised first to married students without children, and no pets were allowed.

In 1962, the building was transformed into a dormitory only for single undergraduate women. In 1966, university officials proposed renovations to reverse the "shabbiness" and deterioration seen in older buildings such as Blackstone. Repairs were needed for broken panes of glass, leaking windows, and cracked paint and plaster. Fundamental renovations were also needed for the electrical and heating systems. Damage caused by the electrical repairs and plastering required complete redecorating of almost the entire building.

Blackstone Hall was one of five "satellite" dorms that was closed after the 2015–2016 academic year upon the opening of Campus North Residential Commons. It was subsequently sold to be turned into apartments.

=== Breckinridge Hall ===
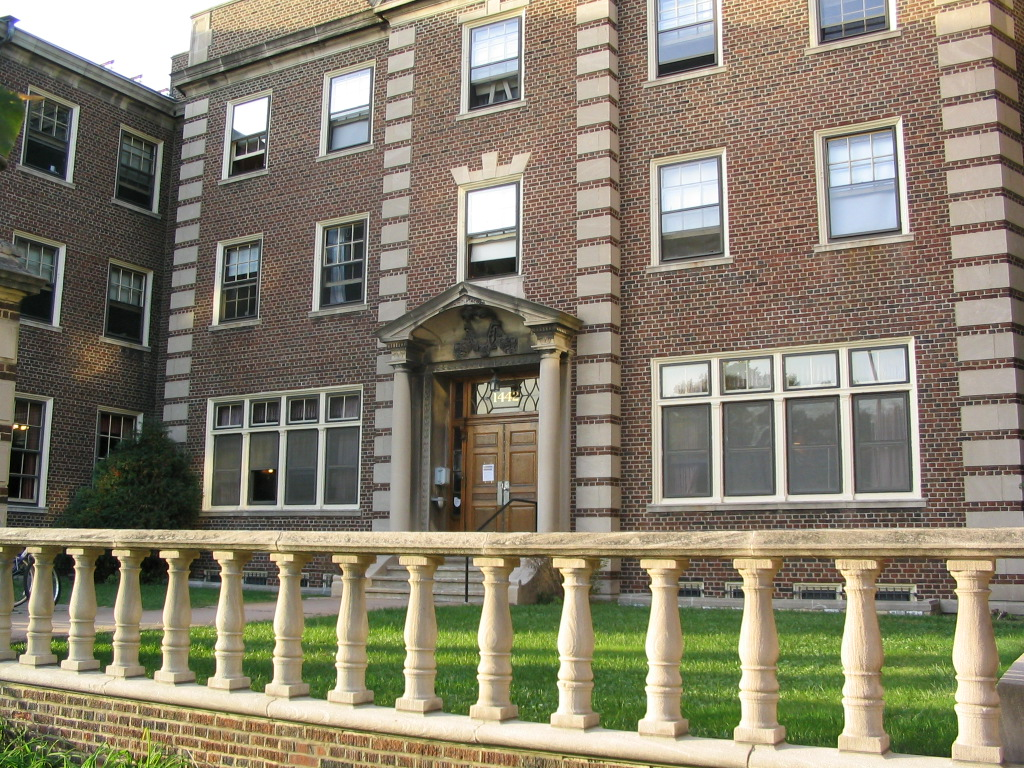
The front of Breckinridge house

Breckinridge Hall is located at 1442 East 59th Street. It accommodated approximately 95 residents plus two RAs and an RH family. There was only one college house in Breckinridge Hall, called Breckinridge House. As one of the smaller dormitories on campus, but one of the largest houses, it was home to undergraduates in its final years, though it had served graduate students in the past. Approximately two-thirds of the rooms are single residence rooms.

In 1898, Ina Law Robertson, an Oregon schoolteacher studying at the University of Chicago, founded "Eleanor Club" to offer affordable housing for employed, single women. The Eleanor Club was very similar to YWCAs. Robertson eventually built six residences, with this one being designed by Schmidt, Garden and Martin and opened in 1916. The building was purchased by the University of Chicago in 1968. The proceeds of the sale created an endowment that funds grants for Chicago women and girls in need of financial assistance. The university then named the building after Sophonisba Preston Breckinridge, who was the Dean of the Chicago School of Civics and Philanthropy, the University of Chicago's first graduate school of social work. Breckinridge was also the first woman to graduate from the law school of the University of Chicago.

After the 2015–2016 academic year, Breckinridge House was moved to International House while Breckinridge Hall was closed to residents. Breckinridge House was originally slated to have its name changed to that of a university donor and its residents relocated to Campus North Residential Commons, but after on-campus activism by the "Save our Satellites" campus organization, it was the sole satellite to retain its original name.

=== Broadview Hall ===
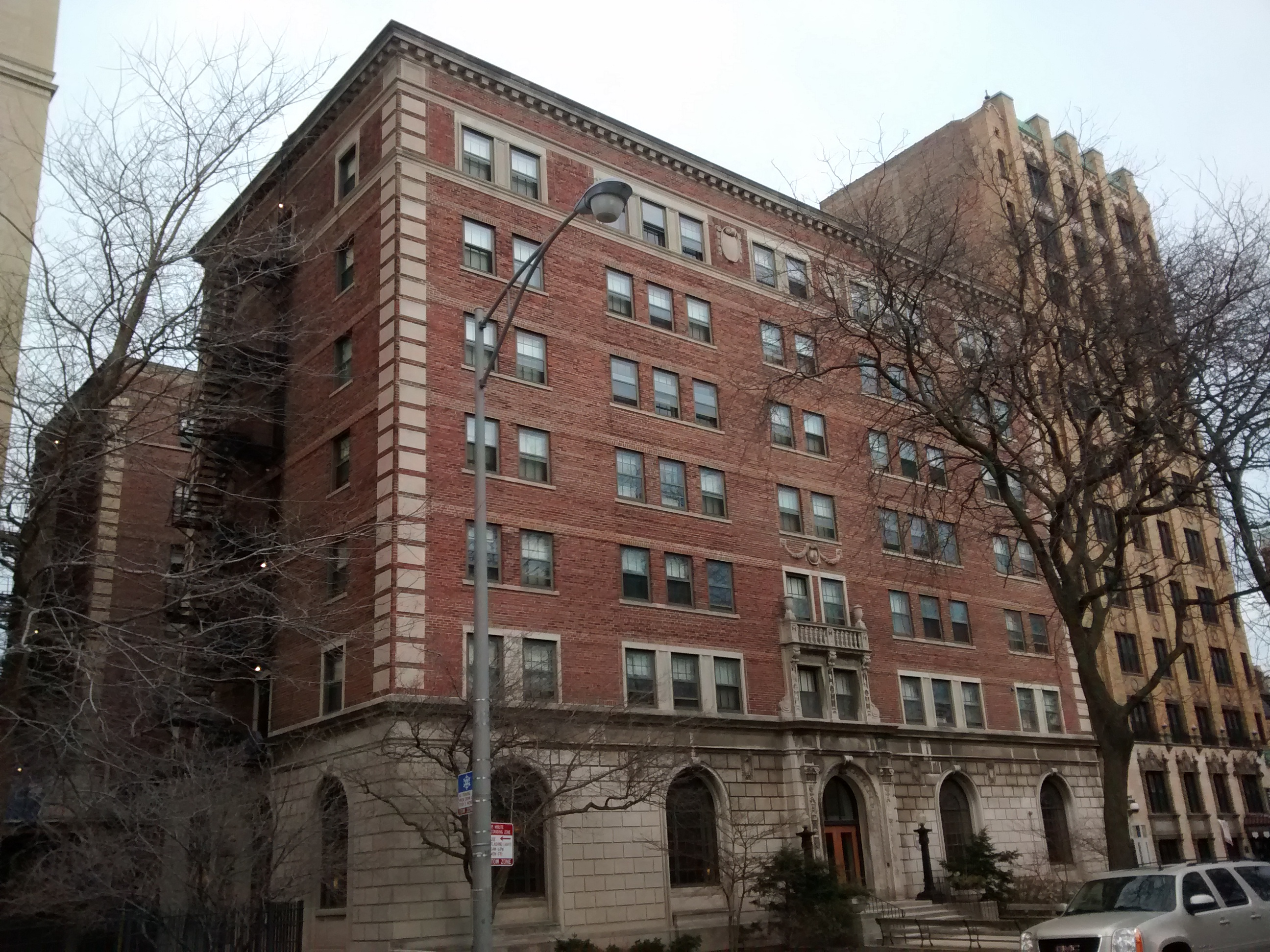
Broadview Hall

Broadview Hall was a residence hall located at 5540 South Hyde Park Boulevard and accommodated 200 residents. Originally built as a hotel and later used for graduate student housing, Broadview was organized into three houses: Wick (the 2nd and 3rd floors), Talbot (the 4th and 5th floors), and Palmer (the 6th and 7th floors). Most rooms were single with private baths. Broadview was about a 20-minute walk from the main campus.

With the opening of Campus North Residential Commons, Broadview Hall closed after the 2015–2016 academic year and was subsequently sold to be turned into apartments.

=== Maclean Hall ===
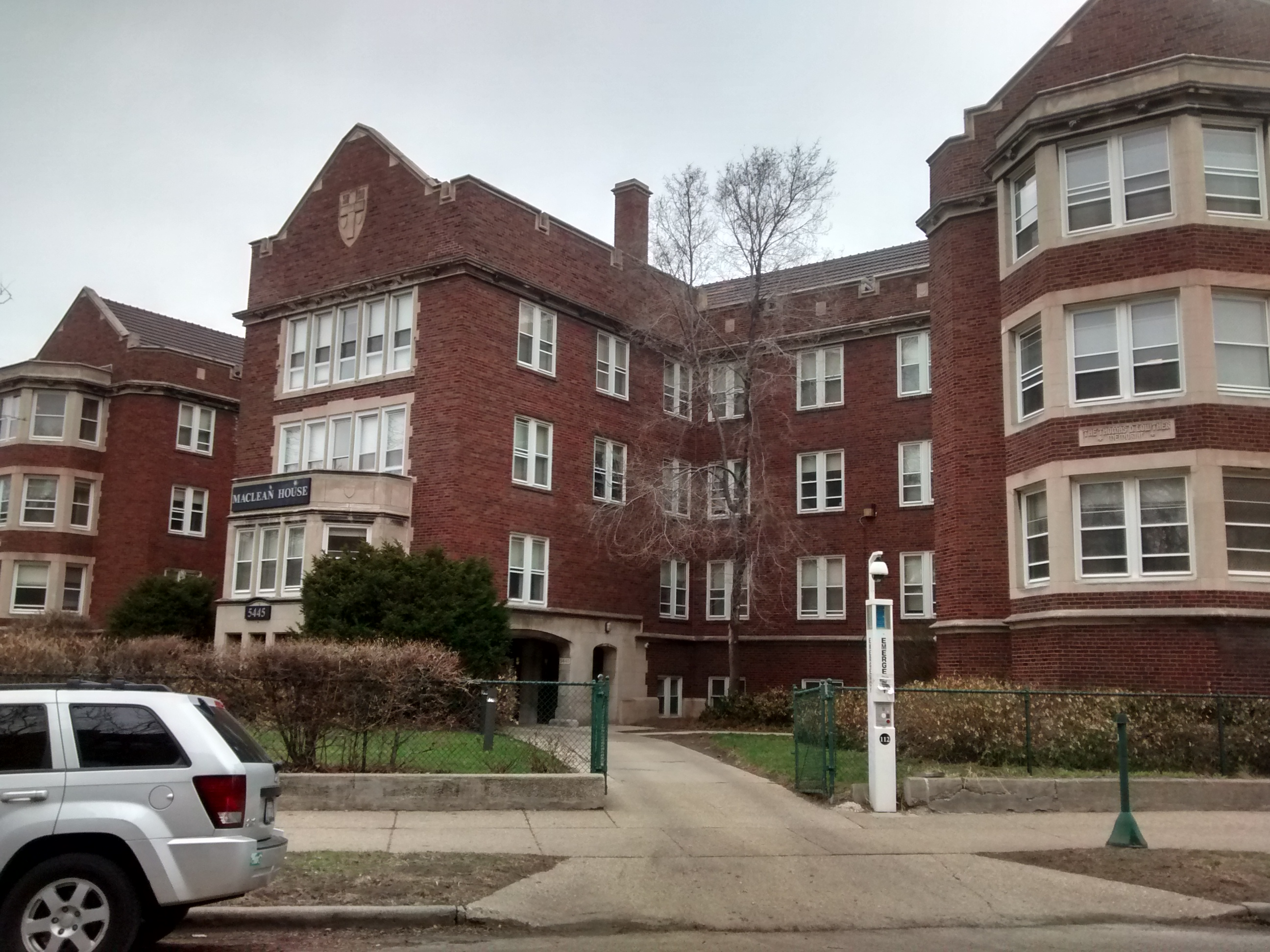
Maclean Hall

Maclean ("muh-klayn") Hall was a residence hall located at 5445 S. Ingleside Avenue and accommodated 98 residents (94 in singles, 4 in two doubles), in one house called Maclean House. Although it was part of the university campus, it was located in a different ZIP code (60615) from the rest of campus and was not featured on most campus maps despite being only one block North of the Gerald Ratner Athletics Center. The four-story building, originally built as a parish retirement home, was acquired by the university and renovated in 1991. Maclean Hall featured the most common space of any house in the Housing System, including a full commercial kitchen, a large central lounge, a dining room, a solarium, a basement game room, and an assembly room with a 15-foot projector wall. It is named for Norman Maclean, a University of Chicago professor and author of the novel A River Runs Through It.

With the opening of Campus North Residential Commons, Maclean Hall closed after the 2015–2016 academic year and was subsequently sold to be turned into apartments.

=== New Graduate Residence Hall ===
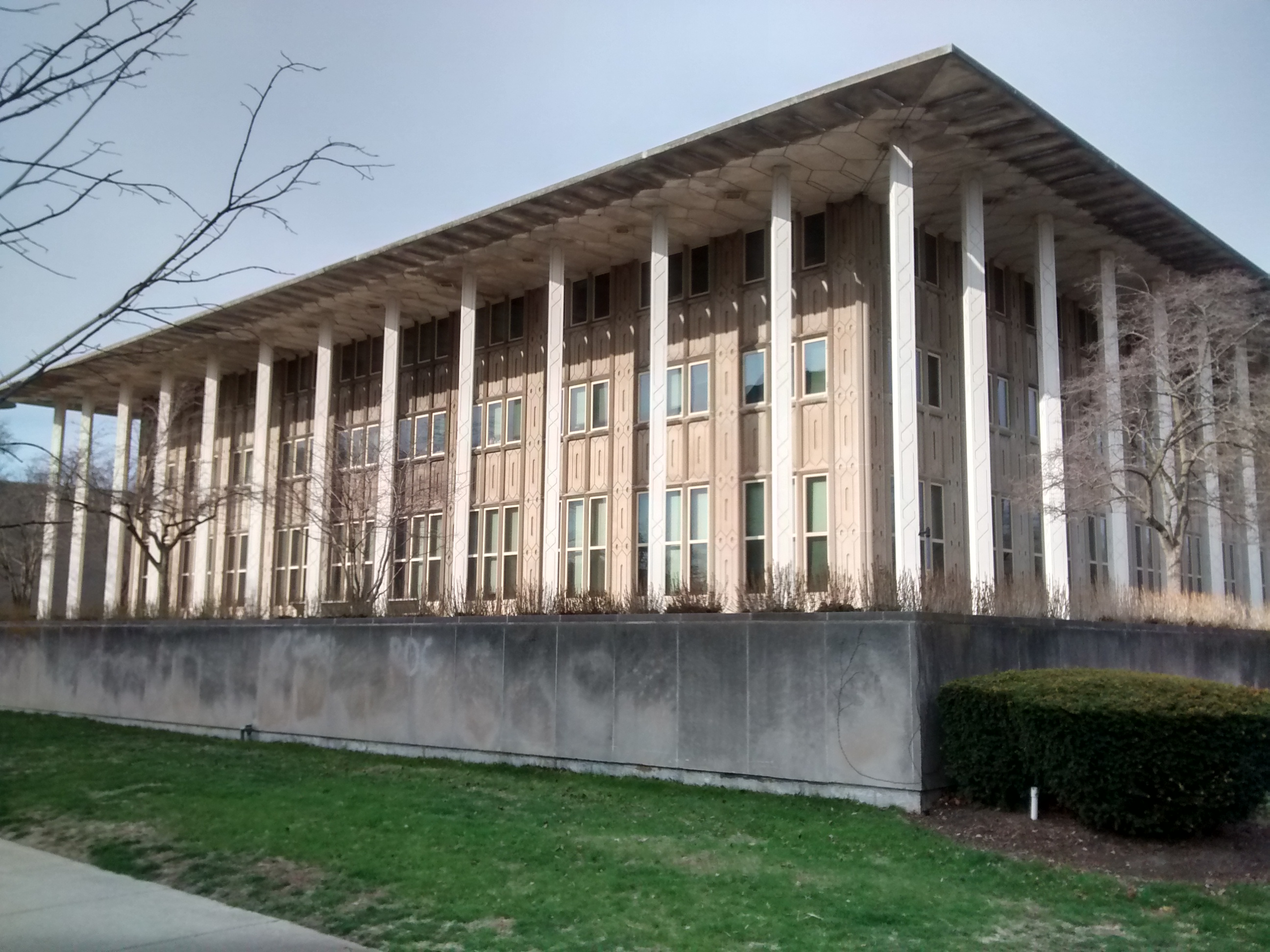
New Graduate Residence Hall

New Graduate Residence Hall, commonly called New Grad, was a residence hall located at 1307 East 60th Street. It accommodated 200 undergraduates in three houses, Midway House, Henderson House, and Tufts House. Both Henderson and Tufts Houses originally occupied Pierce Hall, but with its closure and demolition in 2013, they migrated to New Grad.

After the 2015–2016 academic year, New Grad closed and the three houses occupying it were retired. The building was renovated and turned into the Keller Center at the Harris School of Public Policy.

=== Pierce Tower ===
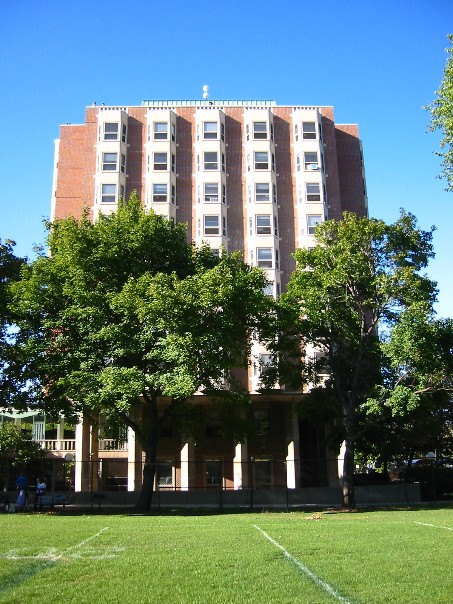
A view of Pierce Tower from Henry Crown Field

Pierce Tower was located at 5514 S. University Ave. and accommodated 250 residents. It stood 10 stories high. All of its houses were co-ed (although Henderson had been male only). More formally known as Stanley R. Pierce Hall, it was constructed during the 1950s and completed in 1960 at a cost of $2,400,000. Its architect was Harry Weese of Harry Weese & Associates. The journal Architectural Record described it as a "major breakthrough on the anti-slab front"; built while Hyde Park was undergoing urban renewal, it was also described as a fortress. It was designed to connect to a twin building, which was never built. Stanley R. Pierce, a fullback for the Chicago Maroons who had gone on to a career as a broker, had willed the university $800,000. The money proved somewhat difficult to locate. Pierce had left a variety of clues that led to the discovery of buried gold coins.

In 1970 the Gay Liberation Front sponsored one of the first openly announced same-sex mixers in Chicago at the dormitory.

Pierce contained four residential houses: Tufts, Henderson, Thompson, and Shorey.

Pierce was dismantled during the second half of 2013. Tufts and Henderson Houses were moved to New Graduate Residence Hall while Thompson and Shorey were moved to International House. Campus North Residential Commons now occupies the site of Pierce Tower.

=== Shoreland Hall ===
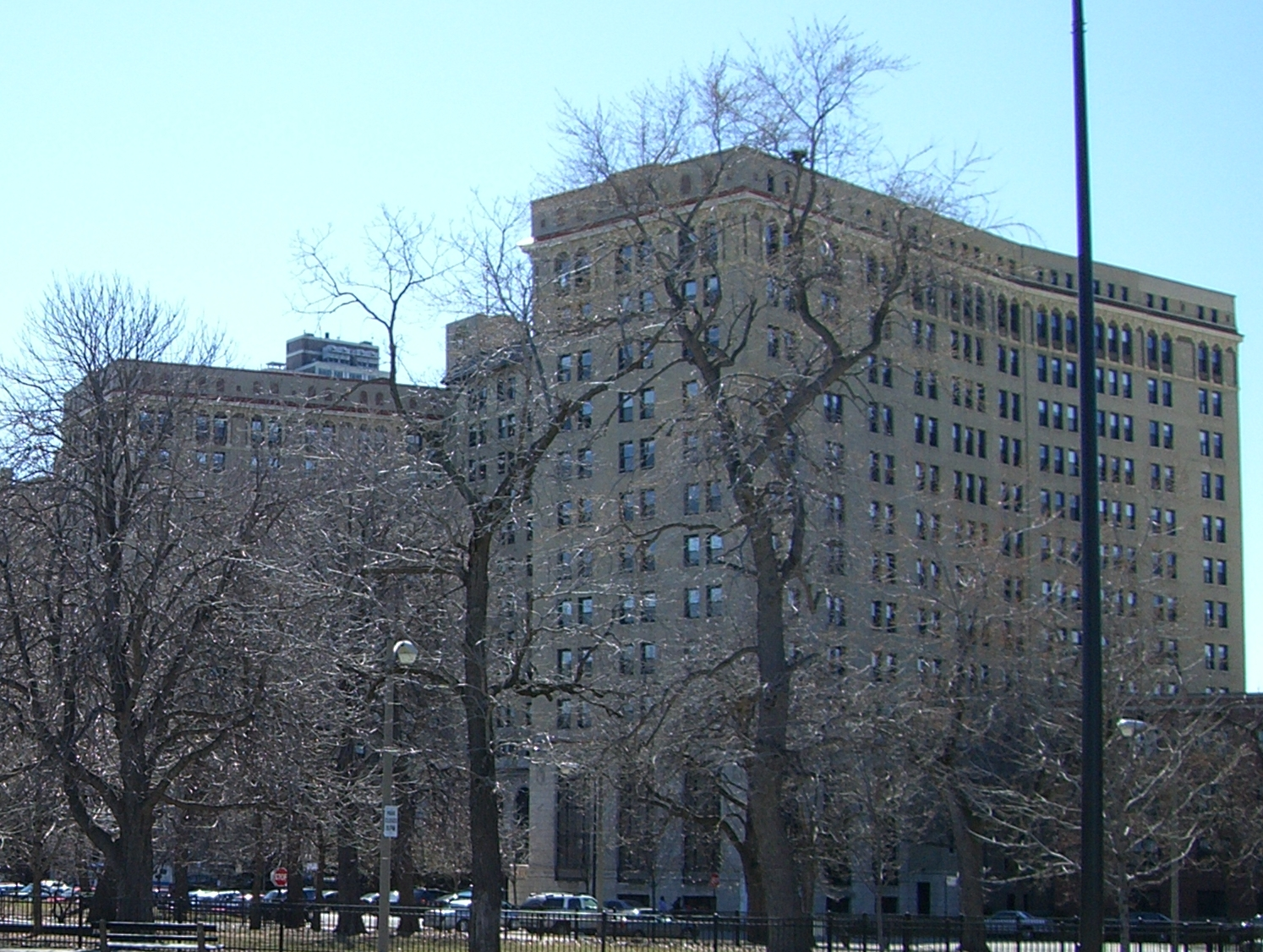
Shoreland Hall

The Shoreland is a former hotel that was added to the United States National Register of Historic Places in 1986. It was a residence hall of the University of Chicago as Shoreland Hall but was retired after the 2008–2009 school year.

Shoreland Hall consisted of the following residential houses: Fallers (floors 1,2,3), Bishop, Dewey, Michelson, Fishbein, Compton, Hale, Filbey, Bradbury and Dudley.

=== Stony Island Hall ===
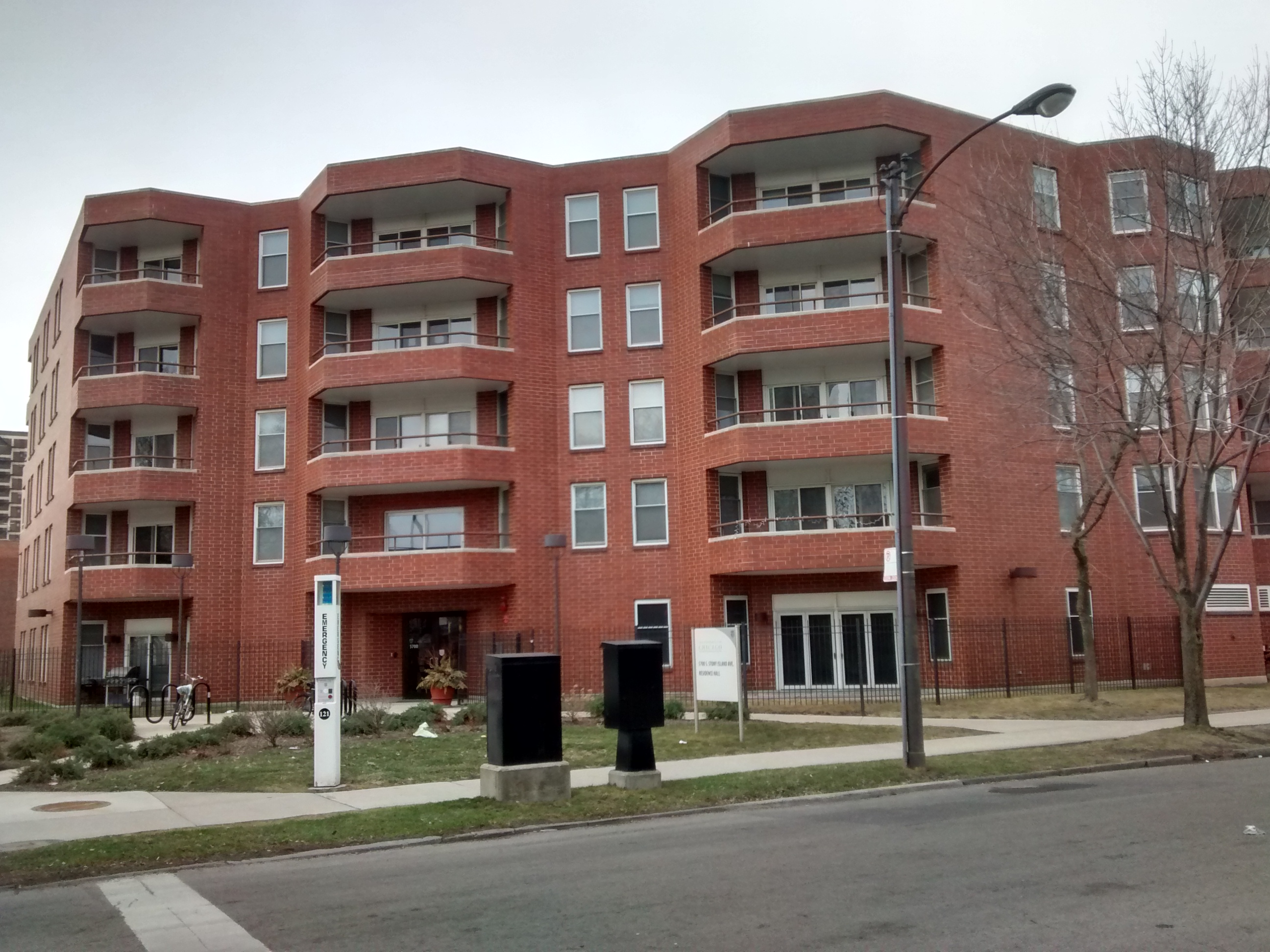
Stony Island Hall

Stony Island Hall, known simply as "Stony", is located at 5700 Stony Island Ave. and housed 77 residents, with four residents to an apartment. It was built in 1988 and has four stories. Prior to the 2010–2011 school year it was only available to upperclassmen students, but presumably due to the record size of the 2010-2011 incoming class, Stony Island accepted First-Year students from the classes of 2014 and 2015. There was only one college house in Stony Island Hall, Stony Island House. Being relatively isolated from the rest of campus, residents of Stony were known to be very close with each other.. The hall closed for student housing at the end of the 2020 school year with the opening of Woodlawn Residential Commons. However, it was reused by the university the following fall as isolation housing for students who tested positive for COVID-19.

=== Woodward Court ===
Woodward Court was a residential hall on the campus of the University of Chicago. It consisted of six houses—Upper and Lower Flint, Rickert, and Wallace. Designed by architect Eero Saarinen, Woodward was constructed between 1957 and 1958. The dorm was demolished in 2001, replaced by the Charles M. Harper Center of the University of Chicago Booth School of Business. It was on E. 58th St. between S. Kimbark and S. Woodlawn Avenues, affording residents views of Robie House and Rockefeller Chapel.
