= GirlForward =

American nonprofit organization

- Formation: 2011
- Founder: Blair Brettschneider
- Type: Non-profit
- Legal status: 501(c)(3)
- Region served: Chicago, Illinois and Austin, Texas
- Revenue: $519,044 (2017)
- Website: www.girlforward.org

GirlForward is a 501(c)(3) non-profit organization founded in 2011 by Blair Brettschneider. It is dedicated to empowering refugee girls aged 12 to 21 from over 40 different countries, who have resettled in areas around Chicago, Illinois, and Austin, Texas. GirlForward uses three core programs to assist refugee girls: the Mentoring Program, the Education Program and the Safe Spaces Program. All three provide English language instruction, financial literacy, and opportunities to meet friends and role models in the community. GirlForward also provides tutoring and mentors to guide the girls throughout their schooling.

== History ==
Blair Brettschneider began her involvement with assisting refugees in high school while working for the Save Darfur Coalition. At RefugeeOne, a non-profit refugee resettlement, Brettschneider met Domi, a refugee girl from Burundi whom she mentored. She was inspired by Domi's story and the stories of other refugee girls. With a $2000 gift from her grandparents, she formed a support group of ten refugee girls. Later, with the help of online crowd-funding campaigns and grant proposals, she was able to expand it. The support group evolved into what is now known as GirlForward.

GirlForward mentors young refugees by helping them adapt to new surroundings around Chicago, Illinois, and Austin, Texas, teaching them English, finance, and social skills. Girls find the organization through referrals or by friends who are involved with the organization. All of the refugees come to America legally with their families through the Office of Refugee Resettlement. Brettschneider travels to the girls' homes to discuss the opportunities the organization has to offer.

GirlForward is headquartered in Chicago, Illinois, while the second location opened in 2016 in Austin, Texas. The organization serves about 200–300 girls a year and has nine people on their staff between the two locations. Both locations are designed with colorful displays to promote a safe and relaxing atmosphere. The organization has no plans to expand into other cities. Future plans include creating a leadership council where refugee girls will assist the organization.

== Services ==
GirlForward serves refugee girls to help ease their integration into the United States through three different programs. The creation of the Mentor, Education, and Safe Spaces programs allows fellow refugee girls to establish a network where they can exchange their experiences with one another. These programs give them access to mentors, educational tutors, leadership opportunities, and interactive activities. The mentoring program allows the girls to explore their passions and opportunities after graduation from high school. The Chicago Foundation for Women granted GirlForward with US$15,000 for its mentorship program.

Interactive activities are centered around what GirlForward calls the four Ws:

=== Wallet ===
The Wallet Program provides guidance on how to make budgets, calculate taxes, make grocery lists, and provides guidance relating to jobs and finances. Mentors work with girls to create resumes, apply for jobs, and provide options for after high school graduation including colleges and careers.

=== Wellness ===
The Wellness Program encourages girls to think deeper about mental and physical health, self-esteem, and body image. The program includes yoga classes, meditation workshops, and long walks.

=== World ===
In the World Program, girls and their mentors share their cultural identities, explore their neighborhoods, and learn about the world. The girls learn how to benefit from the resources within their community, and how to give back to their community by volunteering.

=== Wisdom ===
The Wisdom Program leaves space for girls and their mentors to spend time doing homework, reading, researching and learning about new topics. The mentors provide guidance relating to academics and extra curricular activities, as well as guidance about college and after graduation options. The mentors are volunteers and home-based.

The activities consist of studying English, mathematics, computer skills, exploring museums, learning about different cultures, health/hygiene instruction, budgeting for future trips, dancing to music or singing. Through the Camp GirlForward and the Safe Space Program girls can explore their identity. The Safe Space Program includes a combination of in-school and after school tutoring, field trips and workshops. This is the largest GirlForward program. The non-profit goal is to help refugee girls graduate from college. It currently holds 100% high school graduation; 90% of mentoring program graduates go on to attend college.

== Events ==
=== Girl Jam ===
Girl Jam is an annual fundraiser event organized by GirlForward where girls share their life stories with an audience. The money raised, mainly from foundations and individuals, goes toward budget programs such as the GirlForward summer camp and transportation costs.

During the summer of 2015, $6,000 went toward transportation for girls who could not afford travel fees to the GirlForward facility located in Rogers Park.

The summer camp prepares the girls for the coming school year and provides field trips where girls are encouraged to communicate with each other to improve their English.

=== Feldman Forward Initiative ===
Feldman Forward Initiative was created by Spektral Quartet to help raise money for GirlForward. In March 2017, Spektral Quartet raised $4,150 for GirlForward. For Morton Feldman's Quartet No. 2, Spektral Quartet challenged attendees to stay at the event for the entirety of five-hours in order for a donation to be made in their name to GirlForward. Key supporters, board members, and audience members were the main donors.

=== Feasts of Resistance ===
Feasts of Resistance was a project inspired by Haitian Freedom Soup, a pumpkin-based dish that depicts slaves' freedom living in the Saint-Domingue in 1804. It offered cooking classes to the public. In 2017, GirlForward partnered with Peterson Garden Project for Feasts of Resistance where refugee girls taught cooking classes to introduce dishes representing their homeland and their struggle against oppression.

=== Multicultural Mural ===
The Multicultural Mural was designed by Color Squad, a non-profit organization, based in Austin, Texas. GirlForward partnered with Color Squad and Creative Action to create a 240 feet long mural in East Austin, Texas. The mural illustrates diversity and multiculturalism.

== Awards ==
Title of Award	Publication	Year
Creator Award, Changing the World	WeWork	2017
20 In Their 20s	Crain's Chicago Business	2017
Best Chicago Charities	Thrillest	2017
30 Under 30	Forbes	2017
Best Charities in Chicago	Chicago Magazine	2015

In 2015, Chicago Magazine did a Best Charities in Chicago list with categories of Environment, Health, Hunger & Homelessness, Pets, Justice & Equality, and Community Resources. Chicago Magazine's qualifiers to make the list were 501(c)(3) status from the IRS and those who earned Charity Navigator's top ranking of four stars. GirlForward was placed in the Four to Watch category lacking the Charity Navigator four star ranking.

In 2017, GirlForward founder Blair Brettschneider made Forbes 30 Under 30 list. The list consisted of 20 categories with 30 winners for each category under 30 years old. Brettschneider ranked fourth out of 30 in the Education category.

In 2017, the online media website Thrillist crafted a Best Chicago Charities and Organizations list. GirlForward was one of three Aid Refugee organizations in Chicago.

Crain's Chicago Business published a list of 20 Chicago area professionals under 30 who have acquired local attention in areas of business, law, real estate, philanthropic work, etc. Blair Brettschneider, made the list in 2017 for her philanthropic work with GirlForward.
