= Archibald Motley =

American painter (1891–1981)

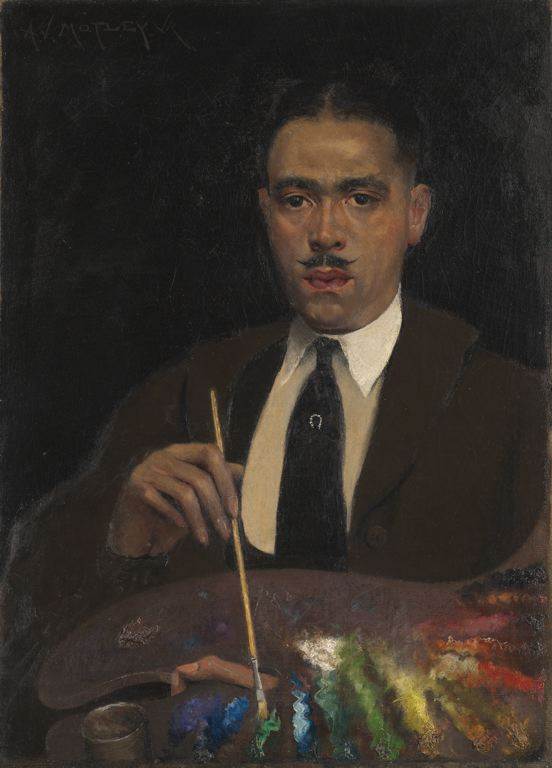
- Self Portrait (1920)
- Born: Archibald John Motley Jr. October 7, 1891; New Orleans, Louisiana, U.S.
- Died: January 16, 1981 (aged 89); Chicago, Illinois, U.S.
- Education: School of the Art Institute of Chicago
- Known for: Painting
- Movement: Harlem Renaissance, Chicago Black Renaissance

Archibald John Motley Jr. (October 7, 1891 – January 16, 1981), was an American visual artist. Motley is most famous for his colorful chronicling of the African-American experience in Chicago during the 1920s through 1940s, and is considered one of the major contributors to the Harlem Renaissance or New Negro Movement, a time in which African-American art reached new heights not just in New York but across America—its local expression is referred to as the Chicago Black Renaissance. Born in New Orleans and raised in Chicago, Motley studied painting at the School of the Art Institute of Chicago during the 1910s, graduating in 1918.

The New Negro Movement marked a period of renewed, flourishing black psyche. There was a newfound appreciation of black artistic and aesthetic culture. Consequently, many black artists felt a moral obligation to create works that would perpetuate a positive representation of black people. During this time, Alain Locke coined the idea of the "New Negro", which was focused on creating progressive and uplifting images of blacks within society. The synthesis of black representation and visual culture drove the basis of Motley's work as "a means of affirming racial respect and race pride." His use of color and varying visual representations of skin-tones, demonstrated his artistic portrayal of blackness as being multidimensional. Motley himself had mixed race ancestry, and often felt unsettled about his own racial identity. Thus, his art often demonstrated the complexities and multifaceted nature of black culture and life.

== Early life and education ==
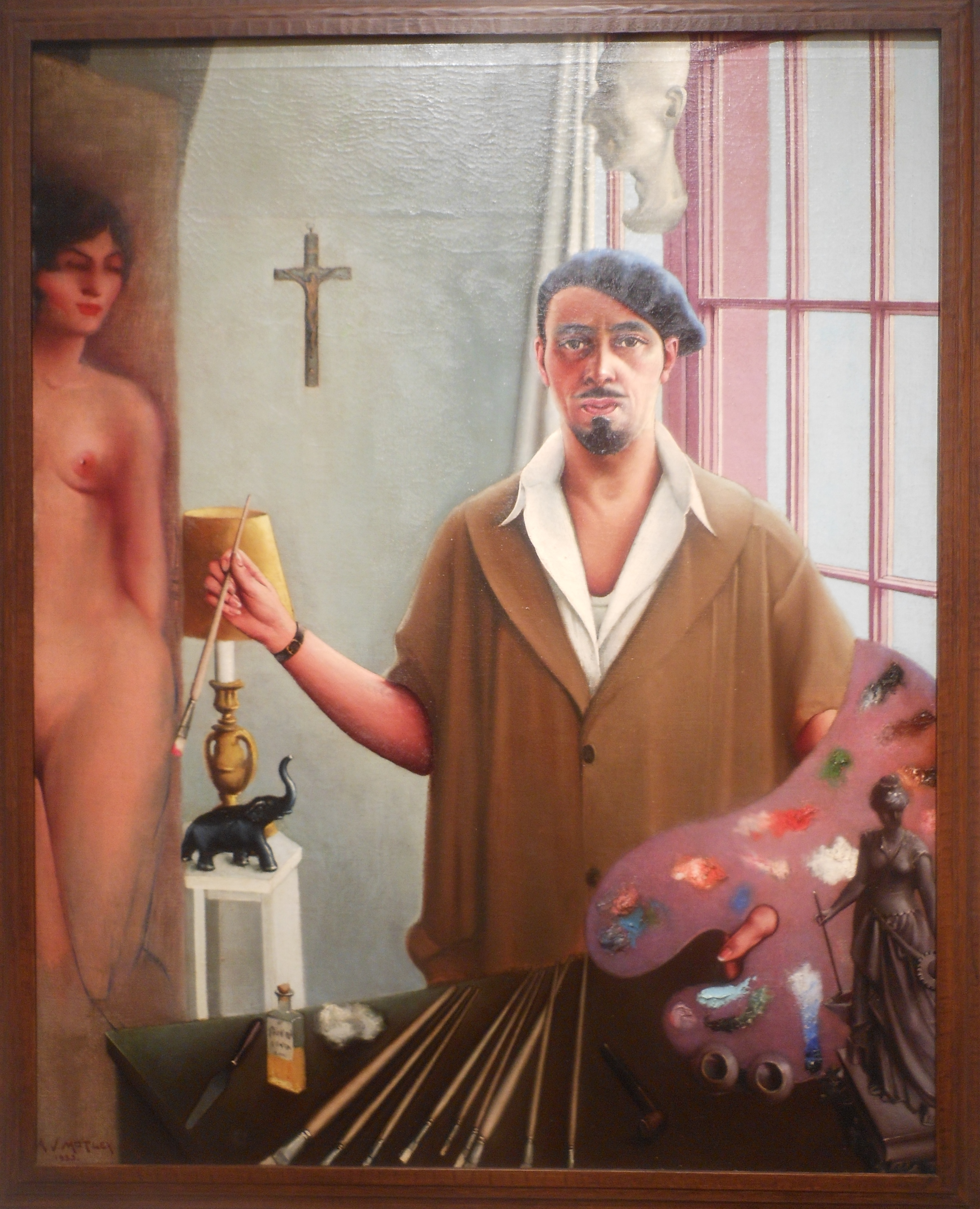
Archibald Motley, Self-Portrait

Unlike many other Harlem Renaissance artists, Archibald Motley, Jr., never lived in Harlem. He was born in New Orleans, Louisiana to Mary Huff Motley and Archibald John Motley Senior. His mother was a school teacher until she married. The family remained in New Orleans until 1894 when they moved to Chicago, where his father took a job as a Pullman car porter. As a boy growing up on Chicago's south side, Motley had many jobs, and when he was nine years old his father's hospitalization for six months required that Motley help support the family.

When Motley was a child, his maternal grandmother lived with the family. She had been a slave after having been taken from British East Africa. She shared her stories about slavery with the family, and the young Archibald listened attentively. He describes his grandmother's surprisingly positive recollections of her life as a slave in his oral history on file with the Smithsonian Archive of American Art.

During World War I, he accompanied his father on many railroad trips that took him all across the country, to destinations including San Francisco, Los Angeles, Hoboken, Atlanta and Philadelphia. It was this exposure to life outside Chicago that led to Motley's encounters with race prejudice in many forms. In his oral history interview with Dennis Barrie working for the Smithsonian Archive of American Art, Motley related this encounter with a streetcar conductor in Atlanta, Georgia:

I wasn't supposed to go to the front. So I was reading the paper and walking along, after a while I found myself in the front of the car. The conductor was in the back and he yelled, "Come back here you so-and-so" using very vile language, "you come back here. You must be one of those smart'uns from up in Chicago or New York or somewhere." It just came to me then and I felt like a fool. I was never white in my life but I think I turned white. I just stood there and held the newspaper down and looked at him. I walked back there. Then he got so nasty, he began to curse me out and call me all kinds of names using very degrading language. I just couldn't take it. And he made me very, very angry.

Motley spent the majority of his life in Chicago, where he was a contemporary of fellow Chicago artists Eldzier Cortor and Gus Nall. He lived in a predominantly white neighborhood, and attended majority-white primary and secondary schools. He graduated from Englewood Technical Prep Academy in Chicago. He was offered a scholarship to study architecture by one of his father's friends, which he turned down in order to study art. He attended the School of the Art Institute of Chicago, where he received classical training, but his modernist-realist works were out of step with the school's then-conservative bent. During his time at the Art Institute, Motley was mentored by painters Karl Buehr and John W. Norton, and he did well enough to prompt his father's friend to pay his tuition. While he was a student, in 1913, other students at the Institute "rioted" against the modernism on display at the Armory Show (a collection of the best new modern art). Motley graduated in 1918 but kept his modern, jazz-influenced paintings secret for some years thereafter.

As a result of his training in the western portrait tradition, Motley understood nuances of phrenology and physiognomy that went along with the aesthetics. He used these visual cues as a way to portray (black) subjects more positively. For example, in Motley's "self-portrait," he painted himself in a way that aligns with many of these physical pseudosciences. The slightly squinted eyes and tapered fingers are all subtle indicators of insight, intelligence, and refinement.

=== Foreign study and inspirations ===
In 1927 he applied for a Guggenheim Fellowship and was denied, but he reapplied and won the fellowship in 1929. He studied in France for a year, and chose not to extend his fellowship another six months. While many contemporary artists looked back to Africa for inspiration, Motley was inspired by the great Renaissance masters whose work was displayed at the Louvre. He found in the artwork there a formal sophistication and maturity that could give depth to his own work, particularly in the Dutch painters and the genre paintings of Delacroix, Hals, and Rembrandt. Motley's portraits take the conventions of the Western tradition and update them—allowing for black bodies, specifically black female bodies, a space in a history that had traditionally excluded them. He felt that portraits in particular exposed a certain transparency of truth of the internal self. Thus, he would focus on the complexity of the individual in order to break from popularized caricatural stereotypes of blacks such as the "darky," "pickaninny," "mammy," etc. Motley understood the power of the individual, and the ways in which portraits could embody a sort of palpable machine that could break this homogeneity. He took advantage of his westernized educational background in order to harness certain visual aesthetics that were rarely associated with blacks. Thus, he would use his knowledge as a tool for individual expression in order to create art that was meaningful aesthetically and socially to a broader American audience. By acquiring these skills, Motley was able to break the barrier of white-world aesthetics. The use of this acquired visual language would allow his work to act as a vehicle for racial empowerment and social progress.

== Career ==
In the beginning of his career as an artist, Motley intended to solely pursue portrait painting. After graduating from the School of the Art Institute of Chicago in 1918, he decided that he would focus his art on black subjects and themes, ultimately as an effort to relieve racial tensions. In 1919, Chicago's south side race riots rendered his family housebound for over six days. In the midst of this heightened racial tension, Motley was very aware of the clear boundaries and consequences that came along with race. He understood that he had certain educational and socioeconomic privileges, and thus, he made it his goal to use these advantages to uplift the black community.

Motley experienced success early in his career; in 1927 his piece Mending Socks was voted the most popular painting at the Newark Museum in New Jersey. He was awarded the Harmon Foundation award in 1928, and then became the first African American to have a one-man exhibit in New York City. He sold 22 out of the 26 exhibited paintings. Motley would go on to become the first black artist to have a portrait of a black subject displayed at the Art Institute of Chicago.

Most of his popular portraiture was created during the mid 1920s. However, there was an evident artistic shift that occurred particularly in the 1930s. Motley strayed from the western artistic aesthetic, and began to portray more urban black settings with a very non-traditional style. By breaking from the conceptualized structure of westernized portraiture, he began to depict what was essentially a reflection of an authentic black community. Ultimately, his portraiture was essential to his career in that it demonstrated the roots of his adopted educational ideals and privileges, which essentially gave him the template to be able to progress as an artist and aesthetic social advocate.

During the 1930s, Motley was employed by the federal Works Progress Administration to depict scenes from African-American history in a series of murals, some of which can be found at Nichols Middle School in Evanston, Illinois. After his wife's death in 1948 and difficult financial times, Motley was forced to seek work painting shower curtains for the Styletone Corporation. In the 1950s, he made several visits to Mexico and began painting Mexican life and landscapes.

=== Skin tone and identity ===
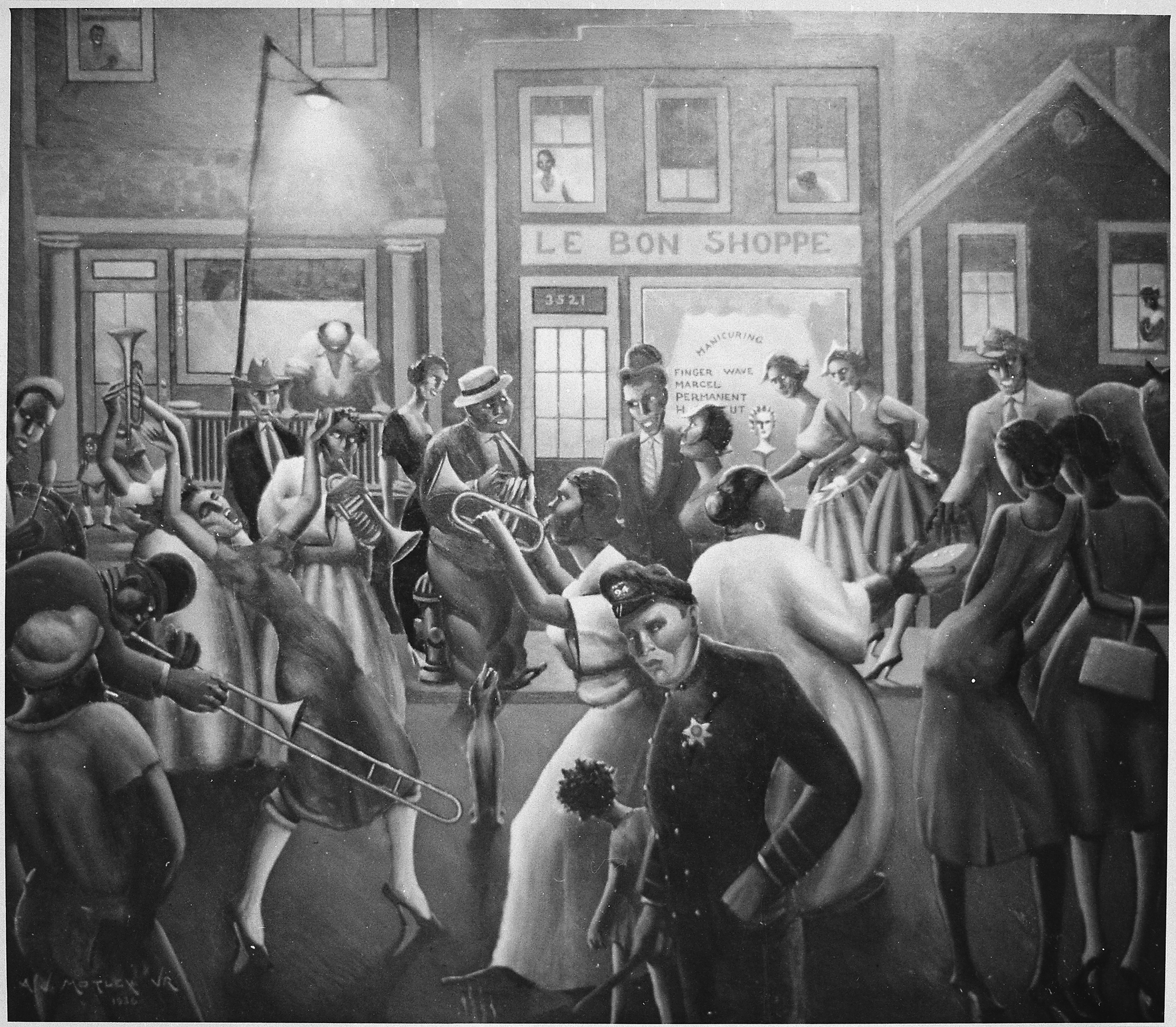
NARA black-and-white photograph of "Getting Religion" painting by Motley (original painting in color)

Motley's family lived in a quiet neighborhood on Chicago's south side in an environment that was racially tolerant. In his youth, Motley did not spend much time around other Black people. It was this disconnection with the African-American community around him that established Motley as an outsider. Motley himself was light skinned and of mixed racial makeup, being African, Native American and European. Unable to fully associate with either Black nor white, Motley wrestled all his life with his own racial identity.

Although Motley reinforces the association of higher social standing with "whiteness" or American determinates of beauty, he also exposes the diversity within the race as a whole. Motley's work made it much harder for viewers to categorize a person as strictly Black or white. He showed the nuances and variability that exists within a race, making it harder to enforce a strict racial ideology.

Motley used portraiture "as a way of getting to know his own people". He realized that in American society, different statuses were attributed to each gradation of skin tone. Motley portrayed skin color and physical features as belonging to a spectrum. He used distinctions in skin color and physical features to give meaning to each shade of African American.

In the 1920s and 1930s, during the New Negro Movement, Motley dedicated a series of portraits to types of Negroes. He focused mostly on women of mixed racial ancestry, and did numerous portraits documenting women of varying African-blood quantities ("octoroon," "quadroon," "mulatto"). In titling his pieces, Motley used these antebellum creole classifications ("mulatto," "octoroon," etc.) in order to show the social implications of the "one drop rule," and the dynamics of what it means to be Black. He would expose these different "negro types" as a way to counter the fallacy of labeling all Black people as a generalized people. These direct visual reflections of status represented the broader social construction of Blackness, and its impact on Black relations. By asserting the individuality of African Americans in portraiture, Motley essentially demonstrated Blackness as being "worthy of formal portrayal." These portraits celebrate skin tone as something diverse, inclusive, and pluralistic. They also demonstrate an understanding that these categorizations become synonymous with public identity and influence one's opportunities in life. It is often difficult if not impossible to tell what kind of racial mixture the subject has without referring to the title. These physical markers of Blackness, then, are unstable and unreliable, and Motley exposed that difference.

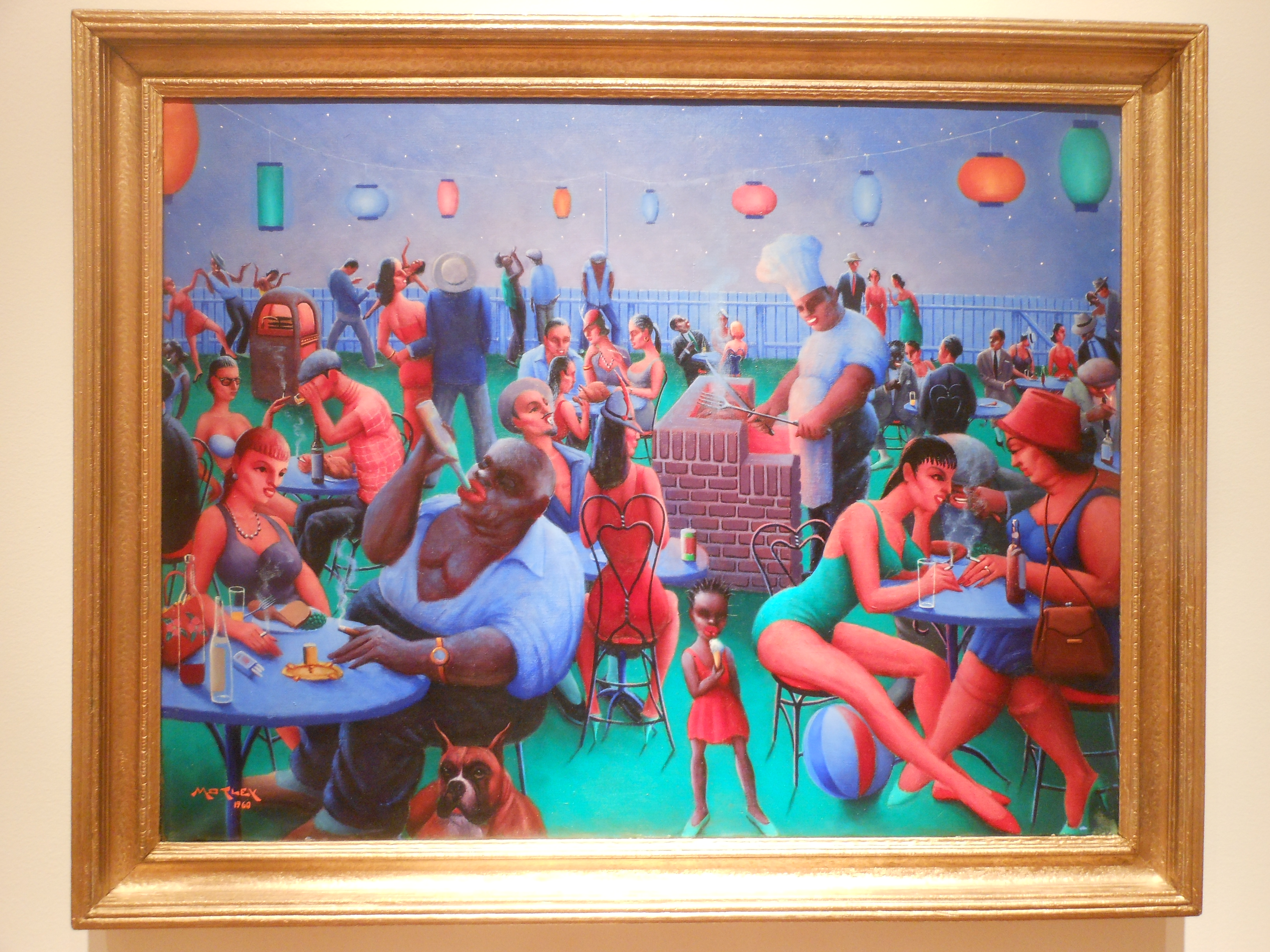
Nightlife (1943), oil on canvas

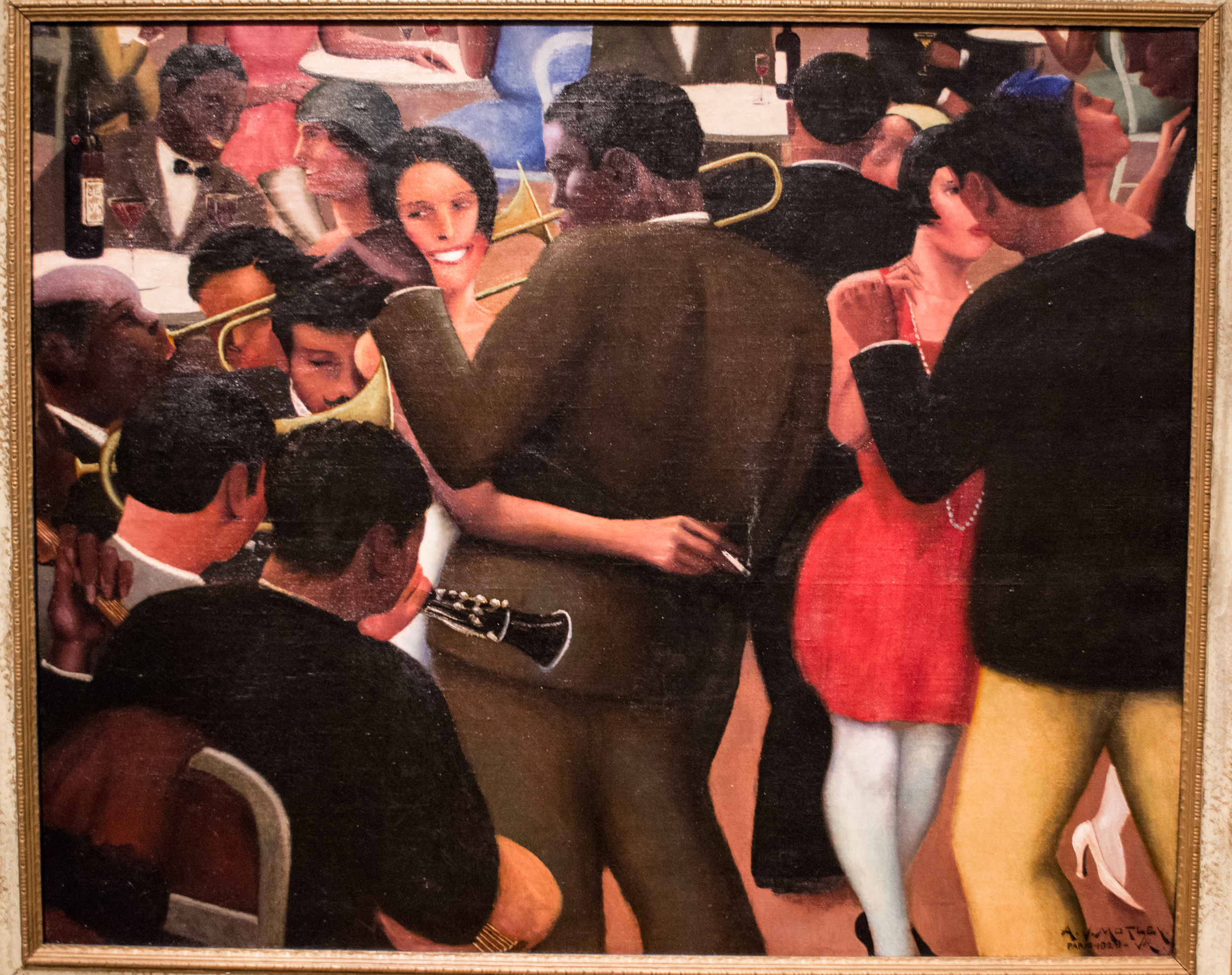
Blues (1929), oil on canvas

Motley spoke to a wide audience of both whites and Blacks in his portraits, aiming to educate them on the politics of skin tone, if in different ways. He hoped to prove to Black people through art that their own racial identity was something to be appreciated. For white audiences he hoped to bring an end to Black stereotypes and racism by displaying the beauty and achievements of African Americans. By displaying the richness and cultural variety of African Americans, the appeal of Motley's work was extended to a wide audience. Many were captivated by his portraiture because it contradicted stereotyped images, and instead displayed the "contemporary black experience." This is consistent with Motley's aims of portraying an absolutely accurate and transparent representation of African Americans; his commitment to differentiating between skin types shows his meticulous efforts to specify even the slightest differences between individuals. In an interview with the Smithsonian Institution, Motley explained his motives and the difficulty behind painting the different skin tones of African Americans:

They're not all the same color, they're not all black, they're not all, as they used to say years ago, high yellow, they're not all brown. I try to give each one of them character as individuals. And that's hard to do when you have so many figures to do, putting them all together and still have them have their characteristics. (Motley, 1978)

By painting the differences in their skin tones, Motley is also attempting to bring out the differences in personality of his subjects. It could be interpreted that through this differentiating, Motley is asking white viewers not to lump all African Americans into the same category or stereotype, but to get to know each of them as individuals before making any judgments. In this way, his work used colorism and class as central mechanisms to subvert stereotypes. By harnessing the power of the individual, his work engendered positive propaganda that would incorporate "black participation in a larger national culture." Motley's work pushed the ideal of the multifariousness of Blackness in a way that was widely aesthetically communicable and popular. In the end, this would instill a sense of personhood and individuality for Blacks through the vehicle of visuality.

Many whites wouldn't give Motley commissions to paint their portraits, yet the majority of his collectors were white. He was able to expose a part of the Black community that was often not seen by whites, and thus, through aesthetics, broaden the scope of the authentic Black experience.

During this time, Alain Locke coined the idea of the "New Negro," which was very focused on creating progressive and uplifting images of Blacks within society. In addition, many magazines such as the Chicago Defender, The Crisis, and Opportunity all aligned with prevalent issues of Black representation. Aesthetics had a powerful influence in expanding the definitions of race. Consequently, many were encouraged to take an artistic approach in the context of social progress. In The Crisis, Carl Van Vechten wrote, "What are negroes when they are continually painted at their worst and judged by the public as they are painted ... preventing white artists from knowing any other types (of Black people) and preventing Black artists from daring to paint them ..." Motley would use portraiture as a vehicle for positive propaganda by creating visual representations of Black diversity and humanity. He would break down the dichotomy between Blackness and Americanness by demonstrating social progress through complex visual narratives.

=== Works and observation of jazz culture ===
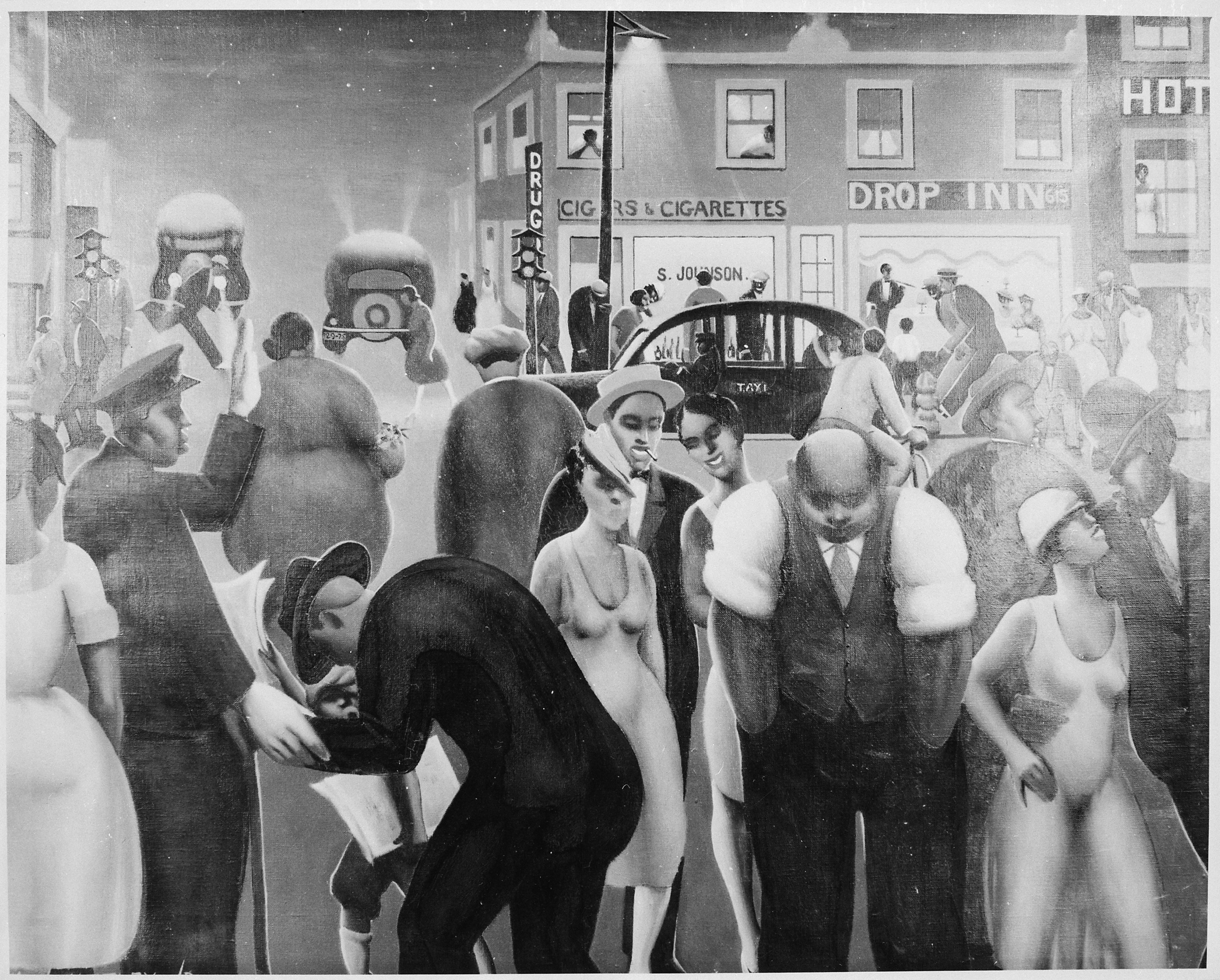
NARA black-and-white photograph of "Black Belt," painting by Motley (original painting in color)

His night scenes and crowd scenes, heavily influenced by jazz culture, are perhaps his most popular and most prolific. He depicted a vivid, urban black culture that bore little resemblance to the conventional and marginalizing rustic images of black Southerners so familiar in popular culture.

==== Bronzeville at Night ====
In his paintings of jazz culture, Motley often depicted Chicago's Bronzeville neighborhood, which offered a safe haven for blacks migrating from the South. One of his most famous works showing the urban black community is Bronzeville at Night, showing African Americans as actively engaged, urban peoples who identify with the city streets. In the work, Motley provides a central image of the lively street scene and portrays the scene as a distant observer, capturing the many individual interactions but paying attention to the big picture at the same time.

Like many of his other works, Motley's cross-section of Bronzeville lacks a central narrative. For example, a brooding man with his hands in his pockets gives a stern look. Behind the bus, a man throws his arms up ecstatically. In the center, a man exchanges words with a partner, his arm up and head titled as if to show that he is making a point. By displaying a balance between specificity and generalization, he allows "the viewer to identify with the figures and the places of the artist's compositions."

==== Stomp ====
In Stomp, Motley painted a busy cabaret scene which again documents the vivid urban black culture. The excitement in the painting is palpable: one can observe a woman in a white dress throwing her hands up to the sound of the music, a couple embracing—hand in hand—in the back of the cabaret, the lively pianist watching the dancers. Both black and white couples dance and hobnob with each other in the foreground. For example, on the right of the painting, an African-American man wearing a black tuxedo dances with a woman whom Motley gives a much lighter tone. By doing this, he hoped to counteract perceptions of segregation.

Critics of Motley point out that the facial features of his subjects are in the same manner as minstrel figures. But Motley had no intention to stereotype and hoped to use the racial imagery to increase "the appeal and accessibility of his crowds." It opened up a more universal audience for his intentions to represent African-American progress and urban lifestyle.

==== The Octoroon Girl ====
The Octoroon Girl features a woman who is one-eighth black. In the image a graceful young woman with dark hair, dark eyes and light skin sits on a sofa while leaning against a warm red wall. She wears a black velvet dress with red satin trim, a dark brown hat and a small gold chain with a pendant. In her right hand, she holds a pair of leather gloves. The woman stares directly at the viewer with a soft, but composed gaze. Her face is serene. Motley balances the painting with a picture frame and the rest of the couch on the left side of the painting. Her clothing and background all suggest that she is of higher class. The poised posture and direct gaze project confidence. The way in which her elongated hands grasp her gloves demonstrates her sense of style and elegance. Motley's use of physicality and objecthood in this portrait demonstrates conformity to white aesthetic ideals, and shows how these artistic aspects have very realistic historical implications.

Motley was "among the few artists of the 1920s who consistently depicted African Americans in a positive manner." The Octoroon Girl is an example of this effort to put African-American women in a good light – or, perhaps, simply to make known the realities of middle class African-American life. Motley's presentation of the woman not only fulfilled his desire to celebrate accomplished blacks but also created an aesthetic role model to which those who desired an elite status might look up to. The Octoroon Girl was meant to be a symbol of social, racial, and economic progress.

In Motley's paintings, he made little distinction between octoroon women and white women, depicting octoroon women with material representations of status and European features. It appears that the message Motley is sending to his white audience is that even though the octoroon woman is part African American, she clearly does not fit the stereotype of being poor and uneducated. He requests that white viewers look beyond the genetic indicators of her race and see only the way she acts now—distinguished, poised and with dignity. In his attempt to deconstruct the stereotype, Motley has essentially removed all traces of the octoroon's race.

==== The Mulatress ====
In his portrait The Mulatress (1924), Motley features a "mulatto" sitter who is very poised and elegant in the way that "the octoroon girl" is. The sitter is strewn with jewelry, and sits in such a way that projects a certain chicness and relaxedness. She is portrayed as elegant, but a sharpness and tenseness are evident in her facial expression. Motley was ultimately aiming to portray the troubled and convoluted nature of the "tragic mulatto." Motley himself identified with this sense of feeling caught in the middle of one's own identity. Thus, this portrait speaks to the social implications of racial identity by distinguishing the "mulatto" from the upper echelons of black society that was reserved for "octoroons." In this way, Motley used portraiture in order to demonstrate the complexities of the impact of racial identity.

Motley used sharp angles and dark contrasts within the model's face to indicate that she was emotional or defiant. While this gave the subject more personality and depth, it can also be said the Motley played into the stereotype that black women are angry and vindictive. Many of the opposing messages that are present in Motley's works are attributed to his relatively high social standing which would create an element of bias even though Motley was also black. Still, Motley was one of the only artists of the time willing to paint African-American models with such precision and accuracy. He treated these portraits as a quasi-scientific study in the different gradients of race.

The distinction between the girl's couch and the mulatress' wooden chair also reveals the class distinctions that Motley associated with each of his subjects. In this series of portraits, Motley draws attention to the social distinctions of each subject.

==== Nightlife ====
During this period, Motley developed a reusable and recognizable language in his artwork, which included contrasting light and dark colors, skewed perspectives, strong patterns and the dominance of a single hue. He also created a set of characters who appeared repeatedly in his paintings with distinctive postures, gestures, expressions and habits. These figures were often depicted standing very close together, if not touching or overlapping one another. Nightlife, in the collection of the Art Institute of Chicago, depicts a bustling night club with people dancing in the background, sitting at tables on the right and drinking at a bar on the left. The entire image is flushed with a burgundy light that emanates from the floor and walls, creating a warm, rich atmosphere for the club-goers. The rhythm of the music can be felt in the flailing arms of the dancers, who appear to be performing the popular Lindy hop. In contrast, the man in the bottom right corner sits and stares in a drunken stupor. Another man in the center and a woman towards the upper right corner also sit isolated and calm in the midst of the commotion of the club.

In an interview with the Smithsonian Institution, Motley explained this disapproval of racism he tries to dispel with Nightlife and other paintings:

And that's why I say that racism is the first thing that they have got to get out of their heads, forget about this damned racism, to hell with racism. ... That means nothing to an artist. We're all human beings. And the sooner that's forgotten and the sooner that you can come back to yourself and do the things that you want to do. (Motley 1978)

In this excerpt, Motley calls for the removal of racism from social norms. He goes on to say that especially for an artist, it shouldn't matter what color of skin someone has—everyone is equal. He suggests that once racism is erased, everyone can focus on his or her self and enjoy life. In Nightlife, the club patrons appear to have forgotten racism and are making the most of life by having a pleasurable night out listening and dancing to jazz music. As a result of the club-goers removal of racism from their thoughts, Motley can portray them so pleasantly with warm colors and inviting body language.

==== Gettin' Religion ====
Painted in 1948, Getting' Religion depicts people strolling and playing music on a city street at night as residents watch from their homes. In an interview with The Whitney Museum, art historian Davarian Baldwin argues that, much like in Black Belt and Bronzeville at Night, Motley renders in this painting the nightlife activities that could be observed on Chicago's The Stroll. Langston Hughes described this entertainment, leisure, and business district in Chicago’s Black Belt community after the First World War as a street that was "full of workers and gamblers, prostitutes and pimps, church folks and sinners." The Stroll's variety is present in the painting, from the figure on the soapbox labeled "Jesus Saves," to the suggestive couple in the foreground, to the nuclear family observing the scene from their porch in the background. Baldwin comments on this "blurry line between sin and salvation":

At nighttime, you hear people screaming out “Oh, God!” for many reasons. [The painting] allows for blackness to breathe, even in the density. From the outside in, the possibilities of what this blackness could be are so constrained. He keeps it messy and indeterminate so that it can be both. Polar opposite possibilities can coexist in the same tight frame, in the same person.

The painting was acquired by The Whitney in 2016. It is currently on display as part of the Alvin Ailey exhibit, Edges of Ailey.

== Death ==
Motley died in Chicago on January 16, 1981.

== Personal life ==
Motley married his high school sweetheart Edith Granzo in 1924, whose German immigrant parents were opposed to their interracial relationship and disowned her for her marriage.

His nephew (raised as his brother), Willard Motley, was an acclaimed writer known for his 1947 novel Knock on Any Door. His daughter-in-law is Valerie Gerrard Browne.

Motley was Catholic.

== Recognition and awards ==
- Frank G. Logan prize for the painting "A Mulattress" (1925).
- Joseph N. Eisendrath Award from the Art Institute of Chicago for the painting "Syncopation" (1925).
- Recipient Guggenheim Fellowship to pursue his studies in Paris (1929–30).
- Harmon Foundation Award for outstanding contributions to the field of art (1928).
- Receives honorary doctorate from the School of the Art Institute (1980).
- Honored with nine other African-American artists by President Jimmy Carter at the White House (1980).

== Retrospective exhibition ==
- The Art of Archibald J. Motley, Jr., the first retrospective of the artist's work, opened at the Chicago Historical Society on October 23, 1991, and then traveled to the Studio Museum in Harlem in New York City (April 25-June 10, 1992), the High Museum/Georgia-Pacific Gallery, Atlanta, GA (June 29-September 25, 1992), and the Corcoran Gallery of Art, Washington, DC (October 10, 1992 – January 3, 1992).
- Archibald Motley: Jazz Age Modernist, the first retrospective of the American artist's paintings in two decades, opened at the Nasher Museum of Art at Duke University on January 30, 2014. The exhibition then traveled to The Amon Carter Museum of American Art in Fort Worth, Texas (June 14–September 7, 2014), The Los Angeles County Museum of Art (October 19, 2014 – February 1, 2015), The Chicago Cultural Center (March 6–August 31, 2015), and The Whitney Museum of American Art, New York (October 2, 2015 – January 17, 2016).
