= Ina Law Robertson =

American educator and social worker

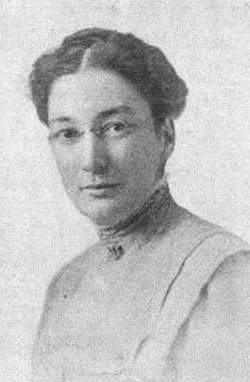
- Ina Law Robertson, from a 1914 publication.
- Born: June 27, 1867; Buena Vista, Oregon
- Died: March 6, 1916 (aged 48); Chicago, Illinois
- Occupation: educator
- Known for: Eleanor Clubs housing for women in Chicago

Ina Law Robertson (July 27, 1867 – March 6, 1916) was an American educator and social worker. In 1898 she opened dormitory-style housing for women, known as the Hotel Eleanor, which grew into The Eleanor Association, a large and lasting community program in Chicago.

== Early life ==
Ina Law Robertson was born in Buena Vista, Oregon, the daughter of Robert M. Robertson and Nancy McMeeken Robertson. Her father was a grain merchant. She trained as a teacher at Albany College in Oregon, and pursued graduate study at the University of Chicago Divinity School.

== Career ==
Robertson was a school teacher and principal in Oregon. In 1895 she moved to Chicago for graduate study, and she opened the Hotel Eleanor in the city's Hyde Park neighborhood in 1898, named for her close friend Eleanor C. Law. Her goal was for the building to be a home and a community center for young single working white women, often new in the city, without local connections, and not earning enough for respectable accommodations. In time, the Central Eleanor Club grew to include other spaces; it housed hundreds of women, and served thousands in other ways, during Robertson's lifetime. The Eleanor Association and the Eleanor Camp (a summer retreat in Lake Geneva, Wisconsin) were formed, to extend and fund the work of the non-profit Club.

Robertson was president of the Eleanor Association and an active member of the Chicago Woman's Club. Ina Law Robertson and Eleanor C. Law were joint trustees in an estate; they donated a large sum to Gordon Mission College, a Presbyterian mission school in Rawalpindi.

== Personal life and legacy ==
Ina Law Robertson died in Chicago in 1916, aged 48 years, from complications following surgery. "No woman has ever adorned our city with more grace of life and efficiency and leadership," eulogized one religious publication, in reporting the news of her death. As of 2016, the Eleanor Association continues, as part of the Chicago Foundation for Women, to offer limited-term affordable living and community supports for women in Chicago.
