= Women and Leadership Archives =

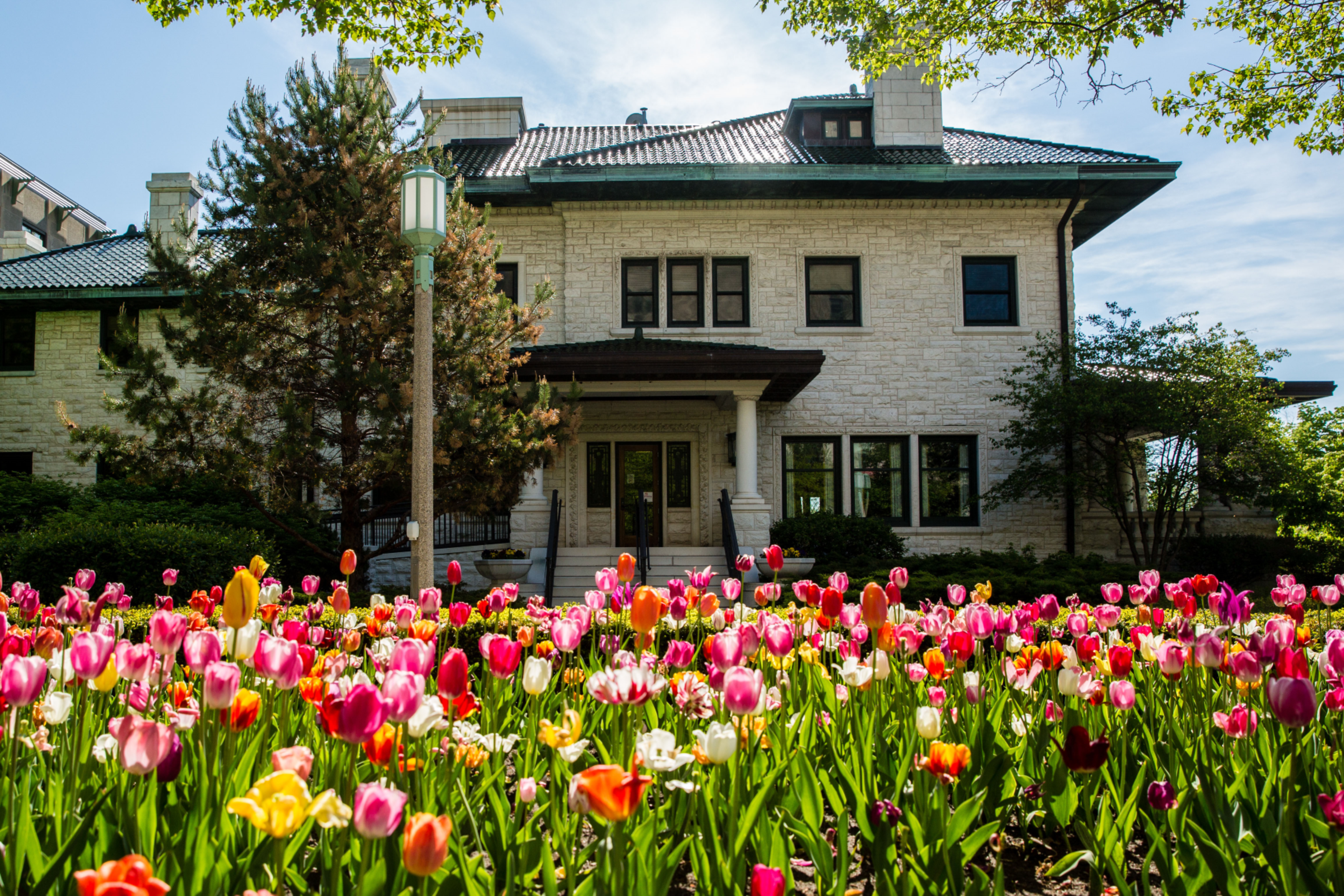
- Piper Hall, Loyola University of Chicago
- Type: Archive
- Established: 1994
- Location: 970 W. Sheridan Rd. Loyola University Chicago. Piper Hall, Third Floor, Chicago, Illinois, U.S. 41.998676°N 87.655514°W
- Website: www.luc.edu/wla
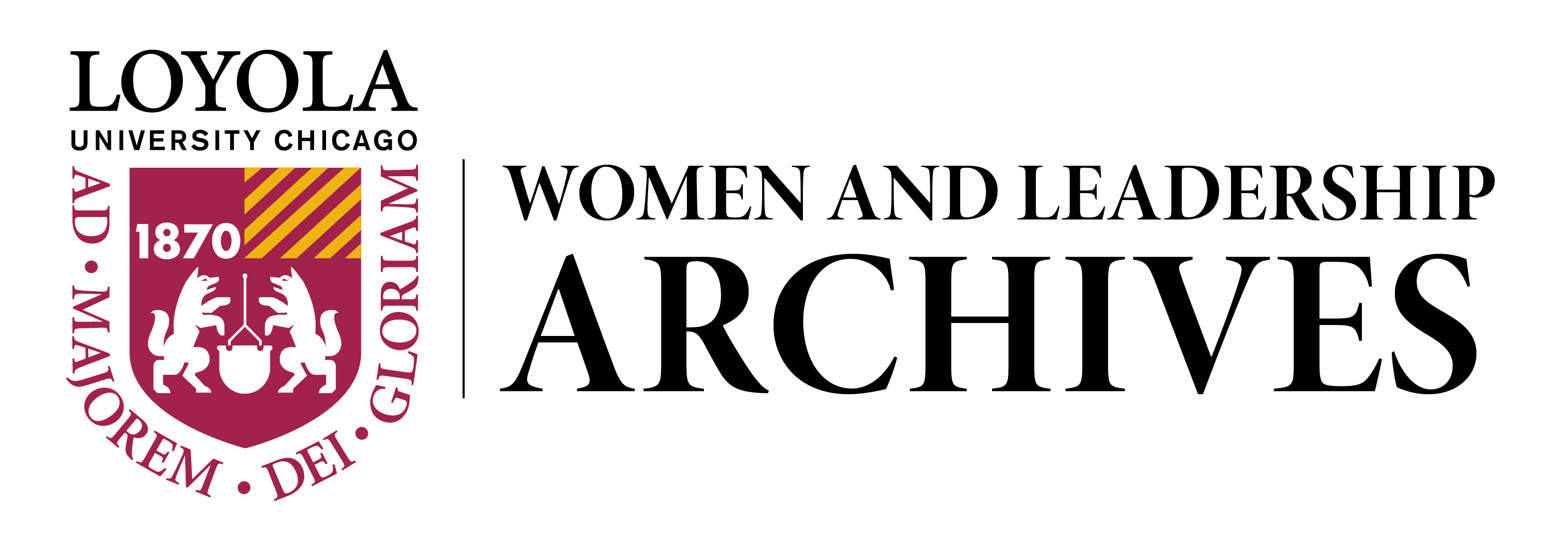

The Women and Leadership Archives is an archives in Chicago, Illinois, located on the campus of Loyola University Chicago. Established in 1994, the Women and Leadership Archives (WLA) collects and makes available permanently valuable records of women and women's organizations, which document women's lives, roles, and contributions. Organizationally, the WLA is part of both the Ann Ida Gannon, BVM, Center for Women and Leadership, and part of Loyola University Chicago's Library system.

== Piper Hall ==
Housed in historic Piper Hall, the WLA maintains an archive in the basement and a reading room on the third floor.

Piper Hall is one of the last lakefront mansions left in Chicago. Built in 1909 by Cassie and Albert Wheeler, Mundelein College acquired the building in 1934. When Mundelein affiliated with Loyola University Chicago in 1991, the building fell under the control of the university. Meticulously restored in 2005, it is now home to the Gannon Center for Women and Leadership and the Women and Leadership Archives.

== History ==
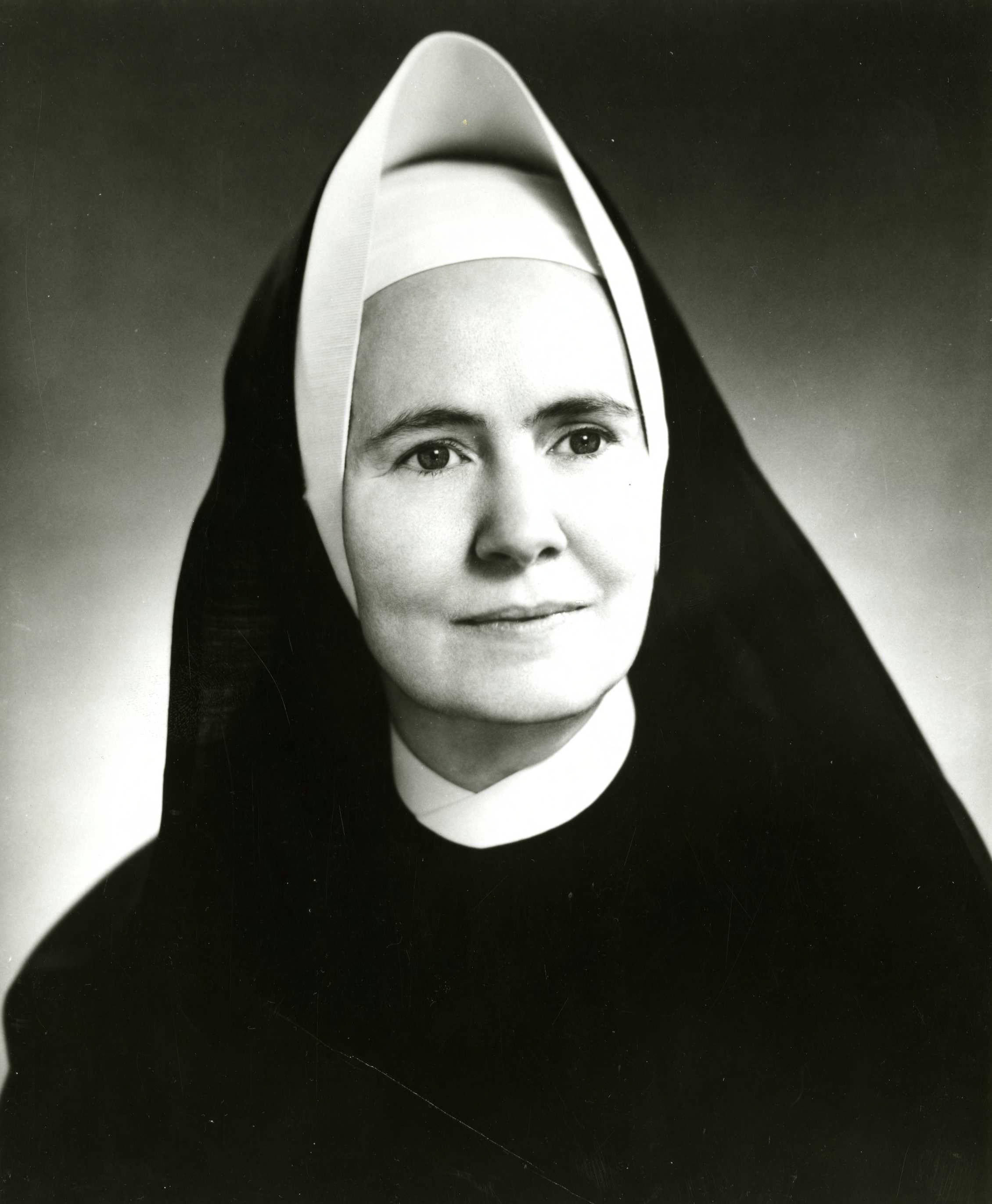
Sister Ann Ida Gannon, BVM, 1959

The Women and Leadership Archives has its roots in Mundelein College, which was founded and operated by the Sisters of Charity of the Blessed Virgin Mary (BVM), and provided education to women from 1930 to 1991, when it affiliated with Loyola University Chicago. The Gannon Center for Women and Leadership, named after Mundelein College's longest serving president, Sister Ann Ida Gannon was created to carry on Mundelein's heritage of fostering women leaders.

The WLA grew out of the need to preserve Mundelein College records and expanded to collect papers of women leaders, including several Mundelein graduates. The Women and Leadership Archives serves a wide variety of users including students, scholars, and the general public.

== Collections ==
=== Scope ===
Collection strengths include the subject areas of activism and women's issues; authors; education; environmental issues; public service; social justice; women religious; and the fine, performance, band visual arts.

Geographically, the WLA prioritizes collecting first within Chicago, its suburbs, and Illinois; second within the Great Lakes region (Indiana, Michigan, Minnesota, Ohio, and Wisconsin); and third within the United States.

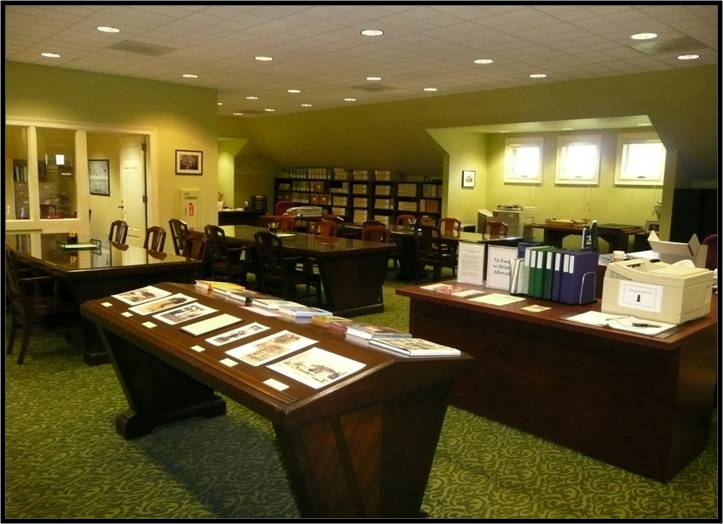
WLA Reading Room.

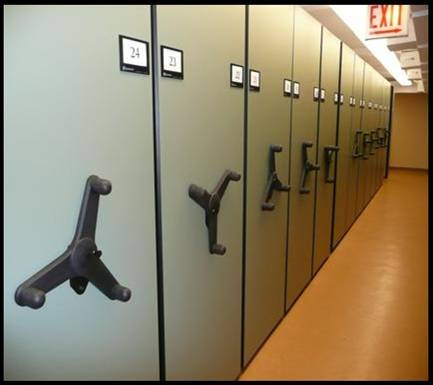
Lower Level Shelves

=== Manuscripts ===
The Women and Leadership Archives store the records of many different individuals and organizations from the Chicago area.

- Sister Jean Dolores Schmidt, BVM, the now famous chaplain for the Loyola Ramblers men's basketball team, was a teacher at Mundelein College before being hired by Loyola. Her manuscript collection is housed in the WLA.
- Jean Fritz, a 51-year-old mother of three, found herself in the middle of one of the most publicized a controversial trial of her time. She spent four months sequestered in a hotel and separated from her family and the outside world as she, and the other eleven jurors, held the fate of seven young defendants in their hands. One of the twelve jurors from the infamous Chicago Seven Trial following the riots of the 1968 Democratic National Convention, donated her papers to the Women and Leadership Archives.
- The Women and Leadership Archives also holds the collection for the Chicago Based feminist art organization, Sister Serpents. The SisterSerpents anonymously published radical feminist art to raise awareness of women's rights and confront misogyny.
- Mercedes McCambridge academy award-winning actress and graduate of Mundelein College.
- Sister Therese Langerbeck earned he B.A. in botany from Northwestern University, Masters in physics and astronomy from University of Michigan, and her Ph.D. in astrophysics from Georgetown University in 1948. Sister Langerbeck became an acclaimed physics teacher at Mundelein College and received many accolades for her work in the field. Her records are located within the Mundelein college collection at the WLA.
