= Sister Serpents =

SisterSerpents
- Formation: 1989
- Founded at: Chicago, Illinois
- Dissolved: 1998
- Purpose: to use art as a weapon to battle misogyny
- Website: https://ssfeministart.omeka.net/

SisterSerpents was a radical feminist art collective that began as a small group of women in Chicago in the summer of 1989, as a direct response to the Webster v. Reproductive Health Services Supreme Court decision. They continued their work through 1998.

== Mission and manifesto ==
Their goal as a collective was to empower women and to increase awareness of women’s issues through radical art. SisterSerpents' public manifesto stated:

SisterSerpents proclaims an end to women’s acceptance of their own oppression. SisterSerpents is fierce and uncompromising, refusing to plead or gently persuade. We recognize and confront the misogyny that exists deep within society…Our struggle hopes to bring the demise of the system that allows for our brutalization… We involve ourselves with idea warfare, instead of the physical and emotional violence which has so long been used upon us… We bare our ideological fangs for the purpose of shocking… Our work is done anonymously… SisterSerpents has no modesty.

Founding member Jeramy Turner stated, “The purpose of SisterSerpents is to use art as a weapon to battle against misogyny.” Members of the group were adamant that they were not a political organization; they sought to use art as a weapon for social change, but not in the context of being hired to make posters for political organizations. The work of SisterSerpents was described by some as "militant".

== Members ==
The group worked anonymously, with loose membership and no affiliation with any formal institutions. In order to become involved, women had to agree that art was the main focus of the group's work, and that all artistic work created by the collective should aim to attack misogyny. Two of the only members who were publicly named were founding members Jeramy Turner and Mary Ellen Croteau. Their Chicago-based group expanded and by 1991 included chapters in San Francisco, Atlanta, Cleveland, Seattle, New York, and Hamburg, Germany.

== Artwork ==
SisterSerpents used posters, art, and stickers to convey their feminist protest message. Many of their posters were created to be produced in multiples and wheat pasted in public spaces, out of a desire to make their message seen in the streets, and included messages such as "Rapists are the Boys Next Door." One feminist pro-choice poster by the group was printed in Industrial Worker. Bright stickers included the "Tips for men" series, with messages such as “tips for men: don’t rape”. Stickers were created to be put over advertisements, with slogans such as “This sells rape. Don’t buy it.” and “Misogyny. Look it up. Stamp it out.” SisterSerpents also created a zine, MadWOMAN Magazine, that was distributed nationally.

The group became immediately infamous for their first poster, which depicted a fetus (in the style of right-wing pro-choice posters) along with text including the phrases: “For all you folks who consider a fetus more valuable than a woman: Have a fetus cook for you; Have a fetus affair; Have a fetus clean your house.” Members explained this artwork directly: “Our poster points to the current fanaticism we call ‘fetus worship’, which preposterously elevates a fertilized egg to the status of ‘unborn child’ and relegates women to the role of parasitical host.”

Their artistic influences included the Berlin-based Dada artists, whose photomontage style and ironic slogans are imitated in the work of SisterSerpents, and the style of the Surrealists. Many of their artworks provided commentary on Western art traditions, such as their re-creation of classical paintings of naked women which replaced the subjects with naked men, or a re-creation of Rodin's The Thinker which elongated the subject's head into a long penis.

Several of artworks created by the collective are in the permanent collection of the Smithsonian’s Cooper-Hewitt National Design Museum.

The group created a logo of a winged snake, which was turned into a rubber stamp to be stamped in red ink on their posters. This logo was designed to be both a strong and humorous image; the group took their name and this logo from the primordial snake that did not die but that shed its skin to emerge into another life, and that has the ability to open peoples’ eyes to the knowledge of good and evil.

== Exhibitions ==
=== Rattle Your Rage: Women's Views of Their Oppressors ===
March/April 1990, Chicago; June/July 1990, ABC No Rio, New York City.

This exhibition included art by 32 artists from around the country. Some of the show’s artworks commented less on society and more directly on the art world and its underlying patriarchal assumptions. The opening in Chicago on March 16, 1990 included a screening of R.W. Fassbinder’s film “Bremer Freiheit”, followed by a panel discussion on the refusal of law enforcement to help women who are being assaulted by their partners. Panelists at this event included Lesley Brown, a woman who served time for the contract killing of her abusive husband; film critic Jonathan Rosenbaum; and curator Lynne Warren. The exhibition was described by reviewers as "unabashedly agitational", and criticism of the show from feminists targeted the fact that it focused heavily on issues of abortion and male oppression of women.

=== First Anniversary Show ===
July 1990, The Guild Complex/At the Edge of the Lookingglass, 62 East 13th Street, Chicago

To celebrate their first birthday, members created a collaborative mixed-media installation which featured a huge man-eating snake hanging from the ceiling, a series of banners, and a dartboard encouraging visitors to “take aim at misogyny” while throwing darts at sexist advertisements.

=== Snakefest '91: Art Against Dickheads ===
February 1991, Artemisia Gallery, Chicago

This exhibition at the women-owned Artemisia Gallery was a juried show featuring posters, performance, video, ceramics, sculpture, and painting. The call for art requested submissions by "angry women" that were humorous while also taking a strong political stance against the victimization of women. Works on display included “Sports Nuts (Koons Meets Oldenburg for the Playoffs) by Mary Ellen Croteau, “What Men Fear Most” by Jeramy Turner, “Pennaddition” and “No. 1705366: This man yelled sexual comments to a women” by Margeaux Klein, as well as “Get it Straight: Violence Hurts” by Carol de Press. Another poster in the exhibition read, “Men: stop raping us, stop beating us, stop killing us.”

The exhibition also included a series of "Snake-outs", which were public events including film screenings, talks, and dramatic performances.

=== Art Against Dickheads: excerpts from Snakefest ’91 ===
March 1991, Midway Studio, Chicago

Including work from the original Snakefest '91 exhibition, this selection of material showed a strong reaction to the fact that many art galleries and museums show naked women but not naked men; in response, this exhibition from SisterSerpents displayed a lot of penises.

=== Piss on Patriarchy, Piss on Passivity ===
Chicago, 1992.

== Public response ==
SisterSerpents was accused of "reverse pornography" and came under fire from the American Family Association and the Heritage Foundation. These negative responses were viewed by SisterSerpents members as proof that their art was necessary.
