= Chicago Foundation for Women =

American nonprofit organization

- Established: 1985
- Founders: Marjorie Craig Benton, Sunny Fischer, Iris J. Krieg, and Lucia Woods Lindley
- Type: 501(c)(3) organization
- Tax ID no.: 36-3348160
- Purpose: Humanitarian
- Headquarters: 140 S Dearborn St #400, Chicago, Illinois 60603
- CEO: Keenya Lambert
- Affiliations: Global Women's Funding Movement
- Website: cfw.org

Chicago Foundation for Women (CFW) is a nonprofit grantmaking organization that focuses on creating opportunities and resources for women in the Chicago area. Many Chicago based organizations such as South Side Giving Circle and LBTQ Giving Council further help women that face violence, poverty, and discrimination using the resources from CFW. CFW receives donations from individuals and corporations, grants from other organizations, the MacArthur Foundation, and partners, The Eleanor Neal foundation, to invest in organizations providing services to Chicago area women in need.

== History ==
CFW is a community foundation that was founded in 1985 by four philanthropists named; Marjorie Craig Benton, Sunny Fischer, Iris J. Krieg, and Lucia Woods Lindley. The current interim president and CEO of the organization is Sunny Fischer. CFW is associated with the Global Women's Funding Movement, a worldwide grant making operation. Actions performed by the organization focus on providing counseling to women and girls within the Chicago area, ending gender discrimination and supporting women and girls who lack economic security.

== Giving Circles and Giving Councils ==
The Chicago Foundation for Women has giving circles and councils that serve as its community funding partners. CFW's giving councils and circles are affinity-based and geographic based. Members of each giving council and circle pool their dollars to expand their investments into local organizations making a difference in the lives of women and girls in their communities. There is a council annual membership fee, half of which goes to the organization as a whole and the other half goes to the specific council itself. Members usually join through website information or from word of mouth, each council is given a budget of about US$40,000 per year.

=== South Side Giving Circle ===
The South Side Giving Circle was created in 2018 with the goal of providing aid to black women and girls within the communities that suffer from gender and race inequities. The members of this giving circle get to decide where the money goes as a group. They mainly give to organizations that help black girls living on the south side of Chicago. Within their first year they donated US$34,000 to five organizations. The group has their meetings in business or spaces that are run by black women. The South Side Giving Circle was created to help black, female-identifying people because of the lack of diversity seen in other Giving Circles. As of 2018 The Giving Circle has 30 members from the South Side neighborhoods in Chicago as of 2018.

=== LBTQ Giving Council ===
The LBTQ giving council was formed in 1998, and they had their first event a year later on October 11, 1999 on National Coming Out Day, to kick-off the council. This was the first group in Chicago to support the LGBTQ community. They showed their support by raising awareness and funds for the LGBTQ community. This group has been awarded more than US$95,000 towards 12 organizations and programs: which include the Youth Empowerment Performance Project (YEPP) and Affinity Community Services. As of 2019, their biggest fundraiser thus far was the Annual International Women's Day Dance at the National Museum of Puerto Rican Arts and Culture.

== Events ==
=== Annual Luncheon and Symposium ===
The Chicago Foundation for Women's luncheon and symposium is an annual event. The luncheon features different keynote speakers, and CFW often uses this luncheon to make announcements about new happenings in their organization. Their 32nd luncheon, which was held at the Hyatt Regency Hotel on Thursday, October 19, 2017 featured Black Lives Matter co-founders Alicia Garza and Dolores Huerta, who are farm workers advocating as speakers. They also announced their Willie Taplin Barrow Fund for Black Women's leadership at this luncheon. On September 18, 2018, CFW crossed the picket line to host the Annual Luncheon at the Hyatt Regency Chicago. There was previously a strike being held at the Hyatt Regency Chicago where the workers were striking for a better contract, CFW had some criticism for their lack of solidarity.

=== Annual International Women's Day Dance ===
The Annual International Women's day dance is hosted by CFW and was created to celebrate queer and transgender women. The dance helps to raise money for the LGBTQ community and to help provide people who identify as female access to information, healthcare, and violence prevention resources. The dance has taken place at the National Museum of Puerto Rican Arts and Culture in the Humboldt Park neighborhood.

=== Impact Awards ===
The Impact Awards are hosted by Chicago Foundation for Women and honors local women for their commitment to improving the lives of women in the Chicago area. There are three categories that reward five women at the Impact Awards event every year. The three categories that define the following qualities according to CFW are: The Founders Award, which is awarded to a woman who has been actively involved to benefit the livelihood of women and girls, the Pioneer Award, which recognizes a female leader who is under the age of thirty and has played an important part in the advancement of women, and the Impact Award, which honors those that have made an outstanding contribution to woman through encouraging economic security, providing different aids for health care, and assisting in violence prevention. Some of the honorees at the impact awards have been Tracy Baim, who co-founded and published the Windy City Times, LGBTQ activists, Terry Cosgrove, and Jane Saks.

== Partners ==
=== Eleanor Foundation ===
In 2012 the Eleanor Foundation transferred around US$7million in assets to the Chicago Foundation for Women. The Eleanor Neal Foundation focused on helping single mothers, but when the organizations numbers began to drop, it was decided that the two organizations would merge. The Eleanor Foundation had a larger bank account at the time of the merge but the Chicago Foundation for Women had built a better fundraising engine that the Eleanor Neal Foundation believed they could not replicate. The organizations decided to merge because they believed it made the most sense for them financially.

=== Catalyst Fund: Resources for Women of Color in Reproductive Justice ===
The Chicago Foundation for Women and the Catalyst Fund: Resources for Women of Color in Reproductive Justice teamed up to give a grant totaling in US$270,000 to advance reproductive justice initiatives. The Catalyst Fund: Resources for Women of Color in Reproductive Justice is an organization led by women of color. They provide information and support on youth education and rights, reproductive and maternal health, and parental rights and reproductive choice. The organizations decided to partner because both of them support women, and wanted to help.

== MacArthur Foundation ==
In July 2017 CFW received a US$1million four year grant from the John D. and Catherine T. MacArthur foundation. CFW was one of 10 other organizations to receive this grant from the MacArthur Foundation. In July 2017 the Macarthur Foundation gave CFW US$1million dollars to help support the organization. The MacArthur foundation is going to support a new project called “The 100% project”. The 100% project will be an effort to end gender bias in the Chicago area and support economic security for women.

== Grants ==
=== Economic security ===
CFW awarded a total of US$1million to organizations in the Chicago area to improve workforce training, support services, and programs designed to stabilize the economic status of women. Acción Chicago, a small business support organization, received US$15,000 to educate minority, women in low-income communities about entrepreneurship. Chicago Youth Centers received US$15,000 to provide STEM education and build children for the workforce. Jane Addams Resource Corporation received US$75,000 for their Women in Manufacturing Program which offers aid and education to female housewives.

CFW awarded US$20,000 to Chicago Women in Trades through The Eleanor Foundation, one of CFW's partners. This organization provides programs and training for women in Chicago.

=== Freedom from violence ===
CFW awarded US$15,000 to GirlForward, a refugee support organization for young girls, to improve their education after going through violence by partnering them up with a mentor through their mentorship program. Another US$15,000 were awarded to A Long Walk Home, a Chicago-based nonprofit organization, to advocate for women of color to end violence.

=== Access to health ===
CFW and the Catalyst Fund: Resources for Women of Color in Reproductive Justice, awarded US$270,000 in six different grants to reproductive justice initiatives. Women in the Chicago area are able to receive education on reproductive rights, support and resources. The Pediatric AIDS Chicago Prevention Initiative received US$19,000 from CFW for their Perinatal Enhanced Case Management program which provides health resources for pregnant HIV positive women. The program educates women about reproductive health, pregnancy, HIV and community base institutions.
