= Michigan's 15th Senate district =

American legislative district

Michigan's 15th State Senate district
Senator
Jeff Irwin; D–Ann Arbor
- Demographics: 64.8% White; 14% Black; 6.6% Hispanic; 8.2% Asian; 0.2% Native American; 0.6% Other; 5.6% Multiracial
- Population (2024): 269,672

Michigan's 15th Senate district is one of 38 districts in the Michigan Senate. The 15th district was created by the 1850 Michigan Constitution, as the 1835 constitution only permitted a maximum of eight senate districts. It has been represented by Democrat Jeff Irwin since 2023, succeeding Republican Jim Runestad.

== Geography ==
District 15 encompasses parts of Lenawee, Monroe, and Washtenaw counties.

=== 2011 Apportionment Plan ===
District 15, as dictated by the 2011 Apportionment Plan, covered western Oakland County in the outer suburbs of Detroit, including the communities of Novi, West Bloomfield Township, Commerce Township, White Lake Township, Wixom, Lyon Township, South Lyon, Walled Lake, and most of Northville.

The district overlapped with Michigan's 11th and 14th congressional districts, and with the 29th, 38th, 39th, 40th, and 44th districts of the Michigan House of Representatives.

== List of senators ==
Senator	Party	Dates	Residence	Notes
Ransom Gardner	Whig	1853–1854	Jonesville	
Alonzo Cressy	Republican	1855–1856	Hillsdale	
Asahel Brown	Republican	1857–1860	Coldwater	Lived in Algansee until around 1859.
Darius Monroe	Republican	1861–1864	Bronson	
Cyrus G. Luce	Republican	1865–1866	Gilead	
Charles W. Clisbee	Republican	1867–1868	Cassopolis	
Amos Smith	Republican	1869–1870	Vandalia	
Uzziel Putnam Jr.	Republican	1871–1872	Pokagon	
James N. Neasmith	Republican	1873–1874	Schoolcraft Township	
Thomas S. Cobb	Democratic	1875–1876	Kalamazoo	
David R. Cook	Republican	1877–1878	Hastings	
Jacob L. McPeek	Republican	1879–1880	Grand Ledge	
Lewis Durkee	Republican	1881	Nashville	Died in office.
David R. Cook	Republican	1881–1882	Hastings	
John M. Norton	Greenback	1883–1884	Rochester	
Samuel William Smith	Republican	1885–1886	Pontiac	
John E. Barringer	Democratic	1887–1890	Armada	Elected on a fusion ticket in 1886, backed by both the Democrats and the Greenback Party.
Martin Crocker	Democratic	1891–1892	Mount Clemens	
Samuel M. Wilkins	Republican	1893–1894	Eaton Rapids	
Arthur D. Hughes	Democratic	1897–1898	Irving	Elected on a Democratic, Populist and free silver ticket.
William W. Potter	Republican	1899–1900	Hastings	
Cassius L. Glasgow	Republican	1903–1906	Nashville	
Karl D. Keyes	Republican	1907–1908	Olivet	
Luren D. Dickinson	Republican	1909–1910	Charlotte	
Coleman C. Vaughan	Republican	1911–1912	St. Johns	
William M. Smith	Republican	1913–1914	St. Johns	
Elbert V. Smith	Republican	1915–1918	Nashville	
Murl H. DeFoe	Republican	1919–1920	Charlotte	
G. Elmer McArthur	Republican	1921–1922	Eaton Rapids	
George G. Hunter	Republican	1923–1926	St. Johns	
Seth Q. Pulver	Republican	1927–1928	Owosso	
Leon F. Miner	Republican	1929–1930	Owosso	
John B. Davidson	Republican	1931–1932	Eaton Rapids	
Henry C. Glasner	Democratic	1933–1934	Charlotte	
Edward W. Fehling	Republican	1935–1938	St. Johns	
Herman H. Dignan	Republican	1939–1942	Owosso	
Murl H. DeFoe	Republican	1943–1946	Charlotte	
Bion L. Bates	Republican	1947–1950	Ovid	
James M. Teahen Jr.	Republican	1951–1954	Owosso	
Donald E. Smith	Republican	1955–1958	Owosso	
John Warner Fitzgerald	Republican	1959–1964	Grand Ledge	
Sander M. Levin	Democratic	1965–1970	Berkley	
Daniel S. Cooper	Democratic	1971–1978	Oak Park	
Doug Ross	Democratic	1979–1982	Oak Park	
Jack Faxon	Democratic	1983–1994	Detroit	
David M. Honigman	Republican	1995–1996	West Bloomfield	Resigned due to poor health.
Bill Bullard Jr.	Republican	1996–2002	Highland Township	Also resided in Milford.
Nancy Cassis	Republican	2003–2010	Novi	
Mike Kowall	Republican	2011–2018	White Lake	
Jim Runestad	Republican	2019–2022	White Lake	
Jeff Irwin	Democratic	2023–present	Ann Arbor	
Felicia Brabec	Democratic	(Note: Member-elect.)		

== Recent election results ==
=== 2020s ===
2026 Michigan Senate election
Party	Candidate	Votes	%
Democratic	Felicia Brabec	43,000	75.86
Democratic	Michael White	13,685	24.14
Total votes		56,685	100
Republican	Jason Rogers	10,633	100
Total votes		10,633	100
General election
Democratic	Felicia Brabec	104,227	76.31
Republican	Jason Rogers	32,349	23.69
Total votes		136,576	100
Democratic hold			

2022 Michigan Senate election, District 15
Primary election
Party	Candidate	Votes	%
Republican	Scott Price	8,253	72.0
Republican	Wychkham Seelig	3,213	28.0
Total votes		11,466	100
General election
Democratic	Jeff Irwin (incumbent)	89,399	74.1
Republican	Scott Price	31,172	25.9
Total votes		120,571	100
Democratic hold			

=== 2018 ===
2018 Michigan Senate election, District 15
Primary election
Party	Candidate	Votes	%
Republican	Jim Runestad	25,757	89.5
Republican	Michael Saari	3,013	10.5
Total votes		28,770	100
General election
Republican	Jim Runestad	67,352	51.7
Democratic	Julia Pulver	62,936	48.3
Total votes		130,288	100
Republican hold			

=== 2014 ===
2014 Michigan Senate election, District 15
Primary election
Party	Candidate	Votes	%
Republican	Mike Kowall (incumbent)	11,344	49.8
Republican	Matt Maddock	9,721	42.7
Republican	Ron Molnar	1,707	7.5
Total votes		22,722	100
Democratic	Michael Smith	6,867	61.3
Democratic	Tom Crawford	4,332	38.7
Total votes		11,199	100
General election
Republican	Mike Kowall (incumbent)	52,797	58.5
Democratic	Michael Smith	37,489	41.5
Total votes		90,286	100
Republican hold			

=== Federal and statewide results ===
Year	Office	Results
2020	President	Biden 50.7 – 48.0%
2018	Senate	Stabenow 51.0 – 47.7%
2018	Governor	Whitmer 52.2 – 45.7%
2016	President	Trump 49.8 – 45.7%
2014	Senate	Peters 50.2 – 46.1%
2014	Governor	Snyder 62.6 – 35.9%
2012	President	Romney 52.6 – 46.8%
2012	Senate	Stabenow 51.3 – 45.6%

== Historical district boundaries ==
Map	Description	Apportionment Plan	Notes
	Oakland County (part); Berkley; Ferndale; Hazel Park; Huntington Woods; Lathrup Village; Madison Heights; Oak Park; Pleasant Ridge; Royal Oak Township; Southfield	1964 Apportionment Plan	
	Oakland County (part); Commerce Township; Farmington; Farmington Township; Huntington Woods; Lathrup Village; Lyon Township; Milford Township; Northville (part); Novi; Novi Township; Oak Park; Royal Oak Township (part); Southfield; South Lyon; Walled Lake; Wixom	1972 Apportionment Plan	
	Oakland County (part); Farmington; Farmington Hills; Ferndale; Huntington Woods; Lathrup Village; Northville; Novi; Novi Township; Oak Park; Royal Oak Township; Southfield; Wixom	1982 Apportionment Plan	
	Oakland County (part); Commerce Township; Farmington; Farmington Hills; Highland Township; Lyon Township; Milford Township; Northville; Novi; Novi Township; South Lyon; Walled Lake; West Bloomfield Township (part); Wixom	1992 Apportionment Plan	
	Oakland County (part); Commerce Township; Highland Township; Holly Township; Lyon Township; Milford Township; Northville (part); Novi; Novi Township; Orchard Lake Village; Rose Township; South Lyon; Walled Lake; West Bloomfield Township (part); White Lake Township; Wixom	2001 Apportionment Plan	
	Oakland County (part); Commerce Township; Lyon Township; Milford Township; Northville; Novi; Novi Township; Orchard Lake; South Lyon; Walled Lake; West Bloomfield Township; White Lake Township; Wixom	2011 Apportionment Plan	
