= Jim Runestad =

American politician (born 1959)

Chair of the Michigan Republican Party
- Incumbent
- Assumed office February 22, 2025
- Preceded by: Pete Hoekstra

Member of the Michigan Senate
- Incumbent
- Assumed office January 1, 2019
- Preceded by: Mike Kowall
- Constituency: 15th district (2019–2023); 23rd district (2023–present)

Member of the Michigan House of Representatives from the 44th district
- In office January 1, 2015 – December 31, 2018
- Preceded by: Eileen Kowall
- Succeeded by: Matt Maddock

Personal details
- Born: March 1, 1959 (age 67)
- Party: Republican
- Education: Central Michigan University (BA)

Jim Runestad (born March 1, 1959) is an American politician. A Republican, he has been a member of the Michigan State Senate, representing the 23rd district, since 2023, and is the Chair of the Michigan Republican Party since 2025. He was previously a member of the Michigan House of Representatives from 2015 to 2018. In 2020, Runestad was one of 11 Republican state senators in Michigan who supported Donald Trump's effort to overturn the result of the presidential election and remain in power.

== Early life ==
Runestad was born March 1, 1959. He has a bachelor's degree in education from Central Michigan University. Since 2004, he has been the owner of Runestad Financial Associates, an insurance business.

== Political career ==
Runestad was an Oakland County Commissioner for three terms, as well as chairman of the Public Services Committee and Planning and Building Committee, before being elected in 2014 to the Michigan House of Representatives from the 44th District, covering Highland, Milford, Springfield, and White Lake townships, and part of Waterford Township. He was reelected to the state House in 2016.

Runestad was elected to the Michigan State Senate in November 2018.

In the 2020 presidential election, Joe Biden defeated Donald Trump; Biden won by three percentage points in Michigan. Trump subsequently launched an effort to overturn the election result and remain in power. In January 2021, Runestad was one of 11 Republican Michigan state senators who promoted Trump's false claims of fraud in the 2020 election; in a letter sent to Congress on January 6, 2021, ahead of the formal counting of the electoral votes, Runestad and the other members of the group baselessly suggested that there were "credible allegations of election-related concerns surrounding fraud and irregularities."

Although one of the most conservative state senators, Runestad has shown libertarian views. In 2021 and 2022, in the aftermath of the murder of George Floyd and killing of Patrick Lyoya, Runestad sponsored a bill (SB 478) to ban the police use of chokeholds unless the person subdued "posed an immediate threat to the life of the law enforcement officer or another individual." However, Runestad voiced opposition to some other police reform proposals, which he suggested unduly constrained police.

In March 2022, Runestad supported a Republican-sponsored non-binding resolution that symbolically called for increasing fossil fuel (oil and gas) extraction and the continuing operations of Enbridge Line 5 under Michigan's Straits of Mackinac. Runestad criticized renewable energy supported by Democrats and climate-change activists. The resolution passed 22–14 along party lines.

In the 2022 election, due to redistricting, Runestad was elected to the Michigan Senate from the 23rd district.

in 2023, Runestad attempted to defeat legislation that would protect LGBT citizens from discrimination; his attempt failed. In 2024, he voted against a bill that would allow Michigan citizens to choose a “non-binary” option on their driver’s license.

Runestad opposes “last-minute” legislation by “lame duck” legislative bodies.

In 2023, Runestad was the lone vote in the Michigan Senate against recognizing Juneteenth as a Michigan state holiday to celebrate the end of slavery in the US.

Party political offices
Preceded by Pete Hoekstra	Chair of the Michigan Republican Party; 2025–present	Incumbent
