= Michigan's 44th House of Representatives district =

American legislative district

Michigan's 44th State House of Representatives district
Representative
Steve Frisbie; R–Pennfield Township
- Demographics: 68.2% White; 13.4% Black; 7% Hispanic; 3.5% Asian; 0.3% Native American; 0.1% Hawaiian/Pacific Islander; 0.5% Other; 7.1% Multiracial
- Population (2024): 89,697

Michigan's 44th House of Representatives district is a legislative district within the Michigan House of Representatives located in Calhoun County. The district was created in 1965, when the Michigan Supreme Court ordered the reapportionment of state legislative districts from a county-based system to a proportional one following the Supreme Court case Reynolds v. Sims. It is currently represented by Republican Steve Frisbie of Pennfield Township.

== List of representatives ==
Representative	Party	Years	Residence	Notes
Floyd J. Mattheeussen	Democratic	1965–1966	Benton Harbor	
Lionel J. Stacey	Republican	1967–1968	Benton Harbor	Resigned to become principal of Benton Harbor High School.
Ray C. Mittan	Republican	1968 (Note: Elected in a 1968 special election to replace Rep. Lionel J. Stacey, who resigned.)–1978	Benton Harbor	
Lad S. Stacey	Republican	1979–1990	Berrien Springs	
Robert Brackenridge	Republican	1991–1992	St. Joseph	Redistricted to the 79th district.
David N. Galloway	Republican	1993–1998	White Lake Township	Term limited.
Mike Kowall	Republican	1999–2002	White Lake Township	
John P. Stakoe	Republican	2003–2008	Highland	Term limited.
Eileen Kowall	Republican	2009–2014	White Lake Township	Term limited.
Jim Runestad	Republican	2015–2018	White Lake Township	
Matt Maddock	Republican	2019–2022	Milford Township	Redistricted to the 51st district.
Jim Haadsma	Democratic	2023–2025	Battle Creek	Redistricted from the 62nd district.
Steve Frisbie	Republican	2025–present	Pennfield Charter Township	
Jim Haadsma	Democratic	(Note: Member-elect.)	Battle Creek	

== Historical district boundaries ==
Map	Description	Apportionment Plan	Notes
	Berrien County (part): Bainbridge Township; Benton Harbor; Benton Township; Berrien Township (part); Coloma; Coloma Township; Hagar Township; Pipestone Township; Royalton Township; Sodus Township; Watervliet; Watervliet Township; Cass County (part): Dowagiac; Silver Creek Township	1964 Apportionment Plan	
	Berrien County (part): Bainbridge Township; Benton Harbor; Benton Township; Berrien Township; Niles; Niles Township (part); Pipestone Township; Cass County (part): Dowagiac; Milton Township (part); Pokagon Township; Silver Creek Township	1972 Apportionment Plan	
	Berrien County (part): Bainbridge Township; Benton Harbor; Benton Township; Berrien Township; Coloma; Coloma Township; Hagar Township; Pipestone Township; Royalton Township; Sodus Township; St. Joseph; St. Joseph Township; Watervliet; Watervliet Township	1982 Apportionment Plan	
	Oakland County (part): Waterford Township; White Lake Township	1992 Apportionment Plan	
	Oakland County (part): Clarkston; Highland Township; Independence Township; Springfield Township; White Lake Township	2001 Apportionment Plan	
	Oakland County (part): Highland Township; Milford Township; Springfield Township; Waterford Township (part); White Lake Township	2011 Apportionment Plan	
	Calhoun County (part): Albion; Battle Creek; Bedford Charter Township; Clarence Township; Convis Township; Emmett Charter Township (part); Lee Township; Pennfield Charter Township; Sheridan Township; Springfield	2021 Apportionment Plan (Note: Referred to as the Hickory plan.)	

== Recent elections ==
=== 2020s ===
2026 Michigan House of Representatives election
Party	Candidate	Votes	%
Democratic	Jim Haadsma	17,935	53.43
Republican	Steve Frisbie (incumbent)	15,634	46.57
Total votes		33,569	100
Democratic gain from Republican			

2024 Michigan House of Representatives election
Party	Candidate	Votes	%
Republican	Steve Frisbie	20,895	50.09
Democratic	Jim Haadsma (incumbent)	20,816	49.91
Total votes		41,711	100
Republican gain from Democratic			

2022 Michigan House of Representatives election
Party	Candidate	Votes	%
Democratic	Jim Haadsma	16,007	52.25
Republican	Dave Morgan	14,631	47.75
Total votes		30,638	100
Democratic gain from Republican			

2020 Michigan House of Representatives election
Party	Candidate	Votes	%
Republican	Matt Maddock (incumbent)	35,416	59.54
Democratic	Denise Forrest	24,067	40.46
Total votes		59,483	100
Republican hold			

=== 2010s ===
2018 Michigan House of Representatives election
Party	Candidate	Votes	%
Republican	Matt Maddock	26,186	57.5
Democratic	Laura Dodd	19,329	42.5
Total votes		45,515	100
Republican hold			

2016 Michigan House of Representatives election
Party	Candidate	Votes	%
Republican	Jim Runestad	33,731	68.6
Democratic	Mark Venie	15,470	31.4
Total votes		49,201	100
Republican hold			

2014 Michigan House of Representatives election
Party	Candidate	Votes	%
Republican	Jim Runestad	21,840	67.8
Democratic	Mark Venie	10,359	32.2
Total votes		32,199	100
Republican hold			

2012 Michigan House of Representatives election
Party	Candidate	Votes	%
Republican	Eileen Kowall	29,772	62.8
Democratic	Tom Crawford	15,744	33.2
Libertarian	Scott Poquette	1,901	4.0
Total votes		47,417	100
Republican hold			

2010 Michigan House of Representatives election
Party	Candidate	Votes	%
Republican	Eileen Kowall	25,714	70.5
Democratic	Philip Fabrizio	9,395	25.8
Libertarian	Thomas Johnson	1,355	3.7
Total votes		36,464	100
Republican hold			

2008 Michigan House of Representatives election
Party	Candidate	Votes	%
Republican	Eileen Kowall	33,271	66.6
Democratic	Mark Venie	16,685	33.4
Total votes		49,956	100
Republican hold			
