= Lakeland High School (Michigan) =

High school in White Lake Township, Michigan

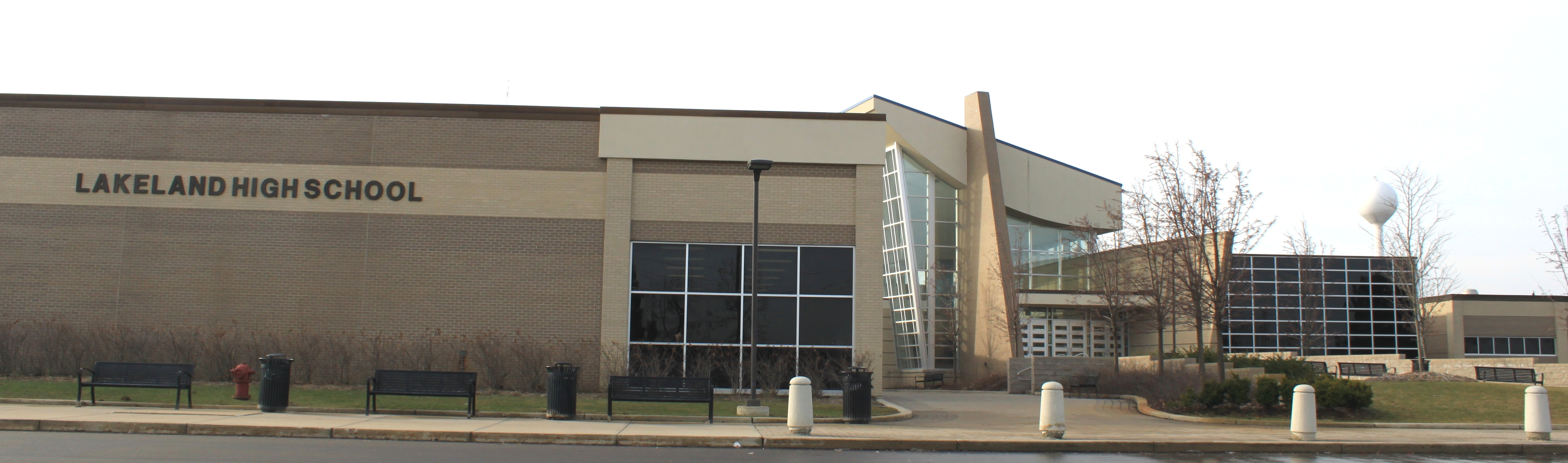

Location
- 1630 Bogie Lake Road; White Lake Township, Michigan 48383; United States; 42°37′33″N 83°30′55″W

Information
- Type: Public
- Opened: 1975
- School district: Huron Valley Schools
- Superintendent: Paul Salah
- CEEB code: 232593
- NCES School ID: 261899005584
- Principal: Libby Held
- Teaching staff: 70.90 (on full-time equivalent (FTE) basis)
- Grades: 9-12
- Enrollment: 1,100 (as of 2023–2024)
- Colors: Silver, Blue, and White
- Athletics conference: Lakes Valley Conference
- Nickname: Eagles
- Newspaper: Talon
- Yearbook: Aquila
- Feeder schools: Oak Valley Middle School, White Lake Middle School
- Website: www.hvs.org/o/lakeland/

Student assessments
- 2021–22 school year Change vs. prior year

M-STEP 11th grade proficiency rates (Science / Social Studies)
- Advanced %: 21.3 / 8.0
- Proficient %: 34.6 / 33.3
- PR. Proficient %: 16.7 / 48.9
- Not Proficient %: 27.4 / 9.8

Average test scores
- SAT Total: 982.9 (▼ −26.8)

Lakeland High School (LHS), commonly referred to as White Lake Lakeland (Note: "White Lake Lakeland" is commonly used in local and regional media outlets, especially when reporting sports scores and competition outcomes.) or Lakeland, is a public high school located in White Lake, Michigan. As of 2023, the current Interim principal is Libby Held. Lakeland opened in 1975, and is in the Huron Valley School District.

While the physical school itself opened in September 1975 (for the 1975–1976 school year), a separate, charter body of "Lakeland High School" students attended Milford High School for up to three years (1972-1975), on a split schedule.

== Athletics ==
Lakeland High School is a member of the Michigan High School Athletic Association (MHSAA) and is home to 14 boys and 14 girls varsity teams across 18 different sports. Lakeland has won five state titles since opening in 1975. These include four in boys' cross country (1991, 1996, 1997, 2016), and one in girls' bowling (2006).

== Notable alumni ==
- Steve Hamilton - author
- T.J. Lang - NFL player
- Grace Stark - Olympic hurdler
- Amber (O'Neill) Roseboom - nonprofit executive
