= Joey Andrews =

American politician from Michigan

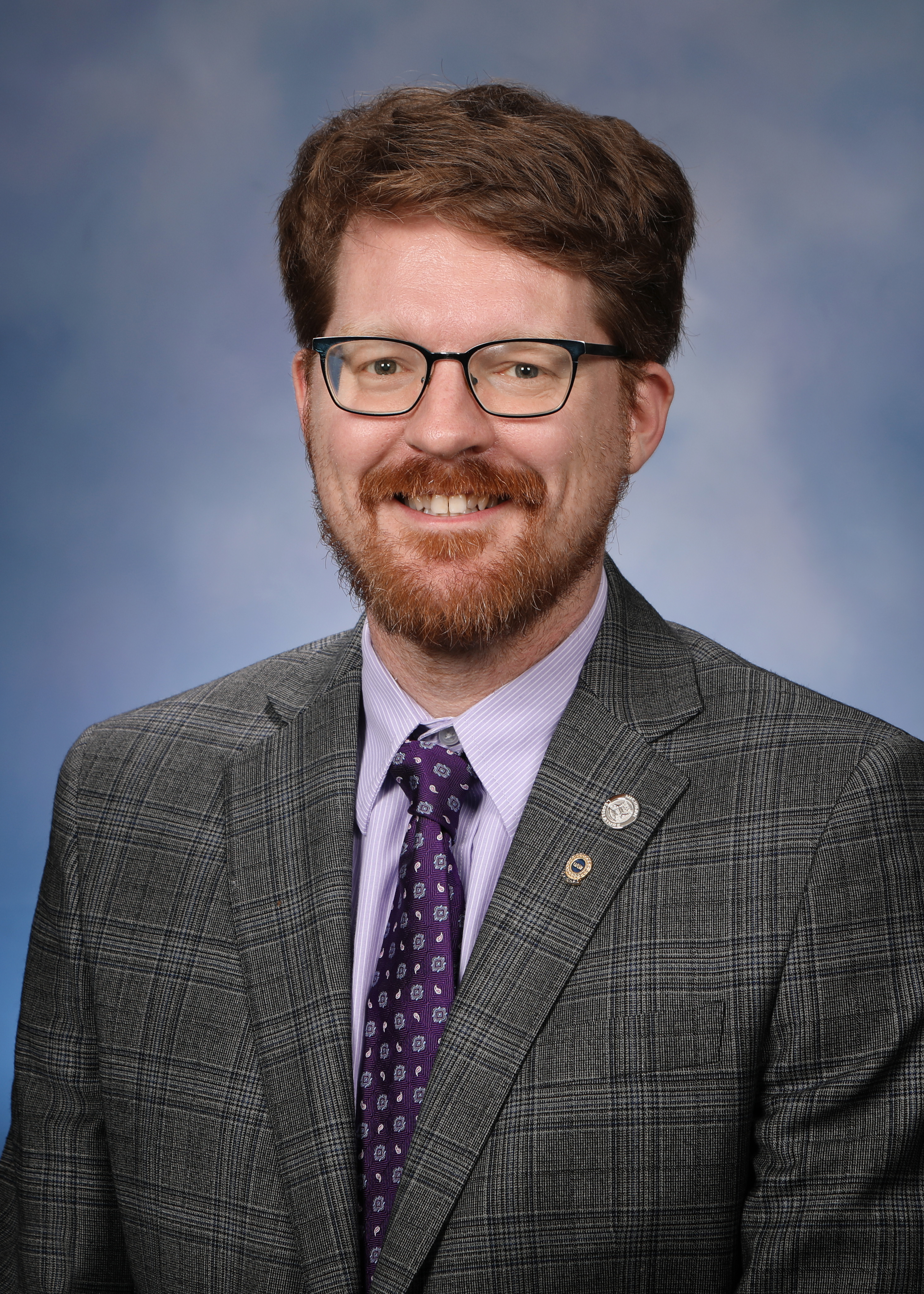

Member of the Michigan House of Representatives from the 38th district
- Incumbent
- Assumed office January 1, 2023
- Preceded by: Kelly Breen

Personal details
- Party: Democratic
- Spouse: Lora Mueller (m. 2022)
- Children: 2
- Education: Carson-Newman University (BA); Wayne State University (JD)
- Profession: Politician

Joey Andrews is an American politician serving as a member of the Michigan House of Representatives since 2023, representing the 38th district. A member of the Democratic Party, Andrews previously worked as a policy analyst for the AFL-CIO, and as a regional coordinator for the Joe Biden 2020 presidential campaign.

== Early life ==
Andrews was born in St. Joseph, Michigan. Andrews graduated from Lake Michigan Catholic High School, now Our Lady of the Lake Catholic High School, in 2006.

== Education ==
Andrews attended Carson-Newman University where he earned his Bachelor of Arts degree in Music and his Bachelor of Arts degree in History.

Andrews attended Wayne State University Law School where he earned a Juris Doctor degree. He was admitted to the State Bar of Michigan in 2014.

== Political career ==
He was elected to the Michigan House of Representatives from the 38th district in the 2022 election. He was reelected in 2024.

== Awards and recognitions ==
- 2024 Leadership for the Common Good Award from Interfaith Action SW Michigan
- 2025 Sustainability Leadership Award from Michigan Sustainable Business Forum

== Personal life ==
Andrews married Lora Mueller in 2022. They have two children and currently reside in St. Joseph, Michigan.
