= T. J. Lang =

American football player (born 1987)

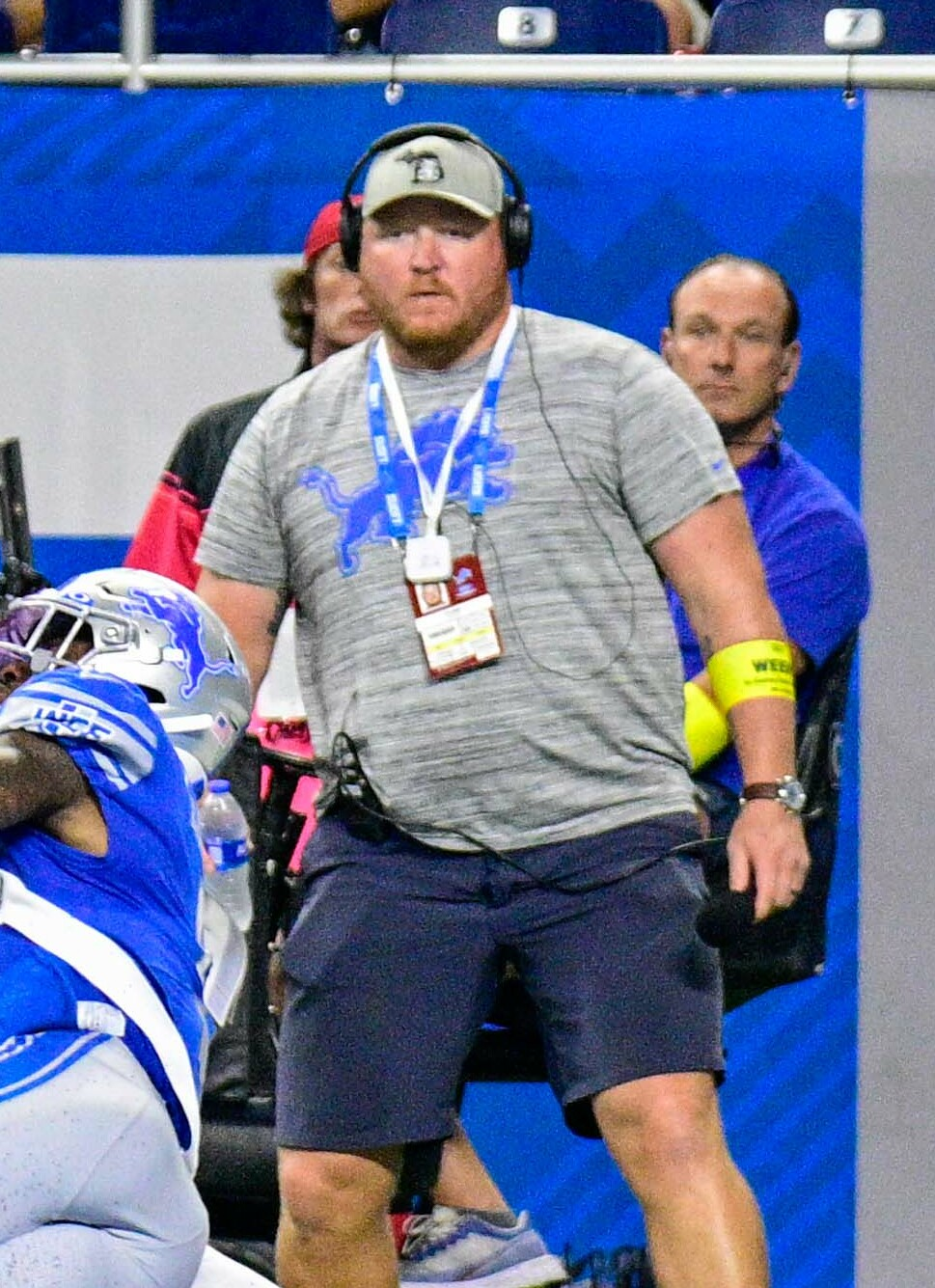
- Lang in 2022

No. 70, 76
- Position: Guard

Personal information
- Born: September 20, 1987 (age 39); Ferndale, Michigan, U.S.
- Listed height: 6 ft 4 in (1.93 m)
- Listed weight: 315 lb (143 kg)

Career information
- High school: Brother Rice (Bloomfield Township, Michigan)
- College: Eastern Michigan (2005–2008)
- NFL draft: 2009: 4th round, 109th overall pick

Career history
- Green Bay Packers (2009–2016); Detroit Lions (2017–2018)

Awards and highlights
- Super Bowl champion (XLV); 2× Pro Bowl (2016, 2017)

Career NFL statistics
- Games played: 138
- Games started: 113
- Stats at Pro Football Reference

Thomas John Lang (born September 20, 1987) is an American former professional football player who was a guard for 10 seasons in the National Football League (NFL). He played college football for the Eastern Michigan Eagles and was selected by the Green Bay Packers in the fourth round of the 2009 NFL draft. Lang was a member of the Packers' Super Bowl XLV championship team, and also played for the Detroit Lions. He earned two Pro Bowl selections in his career.

== Early life ==
Lang was born in Royal Oak, Michigan. He attended Lakeland High School in White Lake, Michigan before transferring to Brother Rice High School in Birmingham, Michigan. He played on both the offensive and defensive line. As a senior, he had 59 tackles, 8.5 sacks, and one fumble recovery on defense and earned first team all state honors.

== College career ==
T. J. Lang attended Eastern Michigan University. As a freshman, Lang played in all 11 games as a defensive lineman, recording 11 tackles, in the 2005 season. As a sophomore in 2006 Lang moved to offensive tackle and started all 36 games over the next three years.

== Professional career ==
Pre-draft measurables
Height	Weight	40-yard dash	10-yard split	20-yard split	20-yard shuttle	Vertical jump	Bench press
6 ft 4 in (1.93 m)	316 lb (143 kg)	5.15 s	1.75 s	2.97 s	4.42 s	26.5 in (0.67 m)	30 reps
All values are from Pro Day

=== Green Bay Packers ===
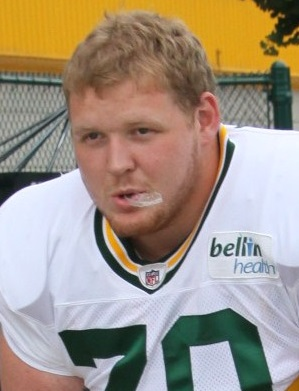
Lang with the Packers in 2011

Lang was selected in the fourth round (109th overall) by the Green Bay Packers in the 2009 NFL draft. On July 7, 2009, he signed a contract with the Packers. Lang started his first game at the left tackle position versus the Cleveland Browns due to an injury to Chad Clifton.

On August 14, 2012, Lang signed a four-year contract extension with the Packers worth $20.8 million and a $5.5 million signing bonus through the 2016 season.

For his play during the 2016 season, Lang earned his first Pro Bowl appearance in the 2017 Pro Bowl.

=== Detroit Lions ===
On March 12, 2017, Lang signed a three-year contract with the Detroit Lions. He started 13 games at right guard in his first season in Detroit, on his way to his second Pro Bowl.

In 2018, Lang started six games at right guard, missing three games due to head, back, and neck injuries, before being placed on injured reserve on November 14, 2018.

On March 8, 2019, Lang was released by the Lions.

On March 29, 2019, Lang announced his retirement from the NFL.

== Broadcasting career ==
Lang joined the Detroit Lions Radio Network as a sideline reporter beginning in the 2021 season.

== Personal life ==
Lang appeared in the movie Pitch Perfect 2 with a group of then-Packer teammates.

Lang's father, Thomas, died of lung cancer in January 2012, at the age of 55.
