= Grace Stark =

American athlete (born 2001)

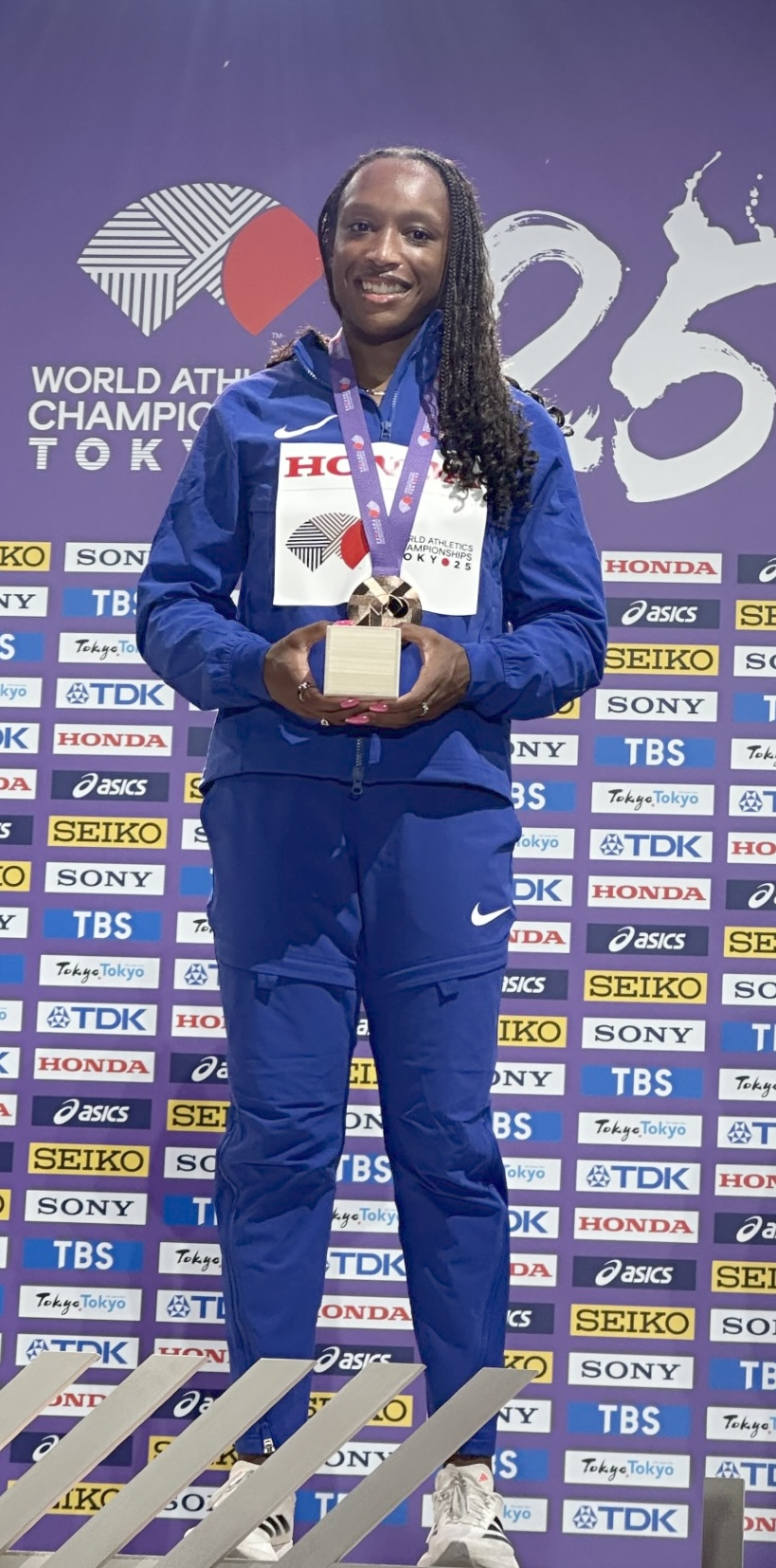
- Stark at Awards Ceremony in Tokyo 2025

Personal information
- Nationality: American
- Born: May 6, 2001 (age 25)
- Home town: White Lake, Michigan, U.S.
- Height: 5 ft 4 in (163 cm)

Sport
- Sport: Athletics
- Event: Hurdles

Achievements and titles
- Personal bests: 60m hurdles: 7.72 (Nanjing, 2025); 100m hurdles: 12.21 (Paris, 2025)
Medal record
Women's athletics
Representing United States
World Championships
Bronze medal – third place	2025 Tokyo	100 m hurdles

Grace Stark (born May 6, 2001) is an American hurdler. She won the bronze medal in the 100 metres hurdles at the 2025 World Championships, having been fifth at the 2024 Paris Olympics and over 60 metres hurdles at the 2025 World Athletics Indoor Championships.

== Biography ==
From White Lake, Michigan, she attended Lakeland High School. As a junior in 2018, she won MHSAA Division 1 state championship titles over 100 metres and 100 metres hurdles. In the hurdles she ran the fastest time ever recorded by a Michigan high school athlete. Stark won the gold medal in the 100m hurdles at the 2018 Summer Youth Olympics in Buenos Aires, Argentina. She was given the honour of being the Team USA flag bearer for the closing ceremony due to her performance.

Stark attended the University of Florida. She won the NCAA Indoor 60m hurdles title in 2022, having run a personal best 7.83 seconds in the heats and lowering it to 7.78 in the final. This time equalled the collegiate record set by Brianna Rollins in 2013. She missed competition time due to a broken leg sustained at the SEC Outdoor Championships in 2022.

=== 2024: Unbeaten NCAA season, Olympic finalist ===
Stark went undefeated competing outdoors in the 2024 college season. This culminated with the NCAA Division 1 Outdoor 100m hurdles title in June 2024 in Eugene, Oregon. That month, she qualified for the final of the US Olympic Trials, finishing third overall in a personal best time of 12.31 seconds. She competed in the 100m hurdles at the 2024 Paris Olympics, reaching the final, where she placed fifth overall with a time of 12.43 seconds.

=== 2025: World Championships medalist ===
Stark was runner-up to Masai Russell in the 60 metres hurdles at the 2025 USA Indoor Track and Field Championships in February 2025. Selected for the 2025 World Athletics Indoor Championships in Nanjing in March, Stark qualified for the semi-finals with a personal best 7.73 seconds, and for the final with an improvement to 7.72 seconds. The final was a close race and she placed fifth overall in 7.74 seconds, as the top six were separated by only 0.04 seconds.

Stark began her 2025 outdoor season with a win over 100 metres hurdles at the Tom Jones Memorial in Gainesville, Florida. She was runner-up in the 100m hurdles at the 2025 Xiamen Diamond League event in China, in April 2025. Stark secured a victory in the women's 100m hurdles at the 2025 Shanghai Diamond League, clocking a meet record time of 12.42 seconds. She also set a new meeting record to win the 100 metres hurdles at the 2025 BAUHAUS-galan event in Stockholm, part of the 2025 Diamond League, running 12.33 seconds. She set a personal best and moved to sixth on the world all-time list with a win over 100m hurdles in the Diamond League at the 2025 Meeting de Paris in 12.21 seconds, on 20 June 2025.

On 2 August, she placed second in the final of the 100 metres hurdles at the 2025 USA Outdoor Track and Field Championships. She placed third in the 100 metres hurdles at the Diamond League Final in Zurich on 28 August. She was selected for the American team for the 2025 World Athletics Championships in Tokyo, Japan, where she won the bronze medal with a time of 12.34 seconds in the final.

=== 2026 ===
Stark opened her 2026 season with a win in 7.86 seconds competing indoors over 60 metres hurdles in Karlsruhe, Germany. In June, Stark placed third in 12.48 seconds in the 100 m hurdles at the LA Grand Prix. On 28 June, Stark was second in 12.38 at the 2026 Meeting de Paris. On 4 July, Stark placed equal third in 12.41 seconds at the 2026 Prefontaine Classic.

== Competition results ==
=== International competitions ===
Representing the United States
Year	Competition	Venue	Position	Event	Result
2018	Youth Olympic Games	Buenos Aires, Argentina	1st	100 m hurdles (76.2cm)	26.14^{1}
2024	Olympic Games	Paris, France	5th	100 m hurdles	12.43
2025	World Indoor Championships	Nanjing, China	5th	60 m hurdles	7.74
2025	World Championships	Tokyo, Japan	3rd	100 m hurdles	12.34

^{1} Cumulative time from both rounds
