= Bill Bullard Jr. =

American politician (1943–2020)

Oakland County Clerk/Register of Deeds
- In office January 1, 2011 – December 31, 2012
- Preceded by: Ruth Johnson
- Succeeded by: Lisa Brown

Member of the Oakland County Board of Commissioners from the 2nd District
- In office January 1, 2003 – January 1, 2011
- Succeeded by: Robert Hoffman

Member of the Michigan Senate from the 15th district
- In office June 6, 1996 – December 31, 2002
- Preceded by: Dave Honigman
- Succeeded by: Nancy Cassis

Member of the Michigan House of Representatives
- In office January 1, 1983 – June 6, 1996
- Preceded by: Claude Trim
- Succeeded by: Nancy Cassis
- Constituency: 60th district (1983–1992); 38th district (1993–1996)

Personal details
- Born: July 12, 1943 Detroit, Michigan, U.S.
- Died: December 18, 2020 (aged 77) Commerce Township, Michigan, U.S.
- Party: Republican
- Education: Detroit College of Law (J.D.); University of Michigan (B.A.)

Bill Bullard Jr. (July 12, 1943 – December 18, 2020) was an American politician. He was a Republican member of both houses of the Michigan Legislature and local official in Oakland County.

== Biography ==
Bullard earned his bachelor's degree from the University of Michigan and Juris Doctor degree from the Detroit College of Law. He served in elected office in Highland Township from 1978 through 1982, and was elected to the state House in 1982. In 1994, Bullard was elected to the state Senate in a special election in June.

After leaving the Legislature, Bullard was elected to the Oakland County Board of Commissioners, where he served four terms, including six years as chairman, before being selected to succeed Ruth Johnson as county clerk/register of deeds when Johnson was elected Michigan Secretary of State. Bullard was defeated for re-election to a full term in 2012 by Lisa Brown.

Bullard died from complications of cancer and COVID-19 at Huron Valley-Sinai Hospital on December 18, 2020, aged 77, during the COVID-19 pandemic in Michigan.
