= Oak Valley Middle School =

Oak Valley Middle School may refer to:

- Oak Valley Middle School (California) — Poway Unified School District, San Diego, California
- Oak Valley Middle School (Michigan) — Huron Valley School District, Oakland County, Michigan
