= Huron Valley =

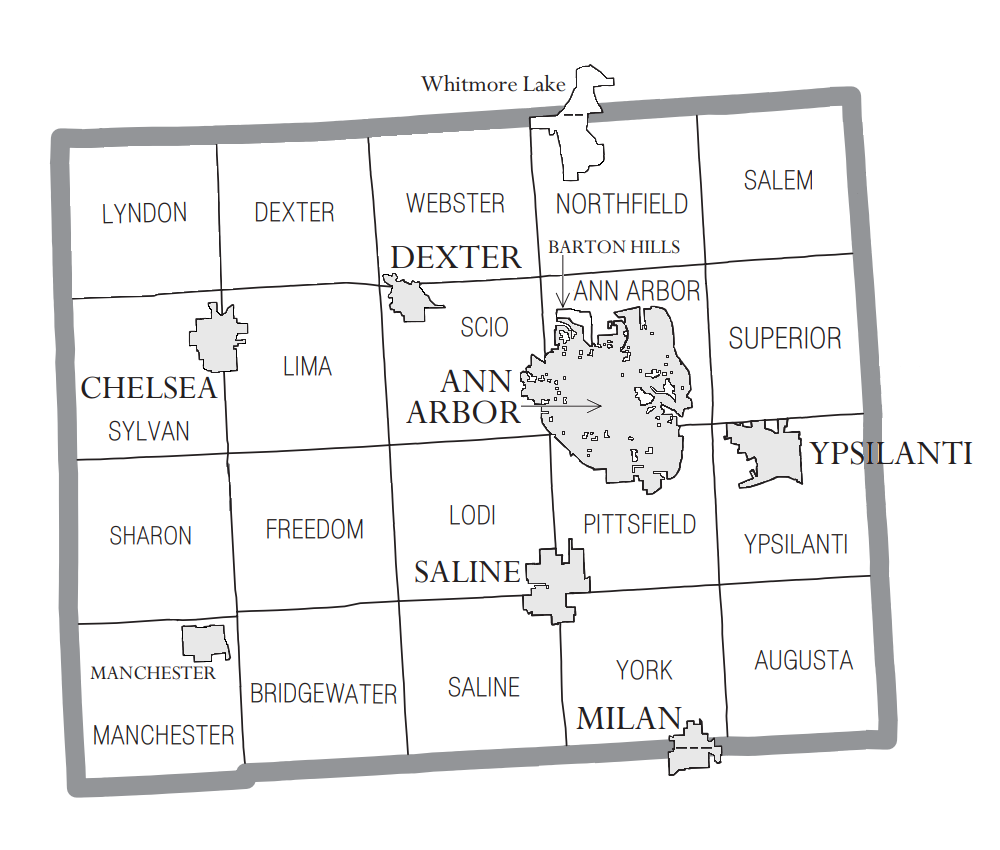
The Huron Valley region roughly corresponds to Washtenaw County and surrounding townships.

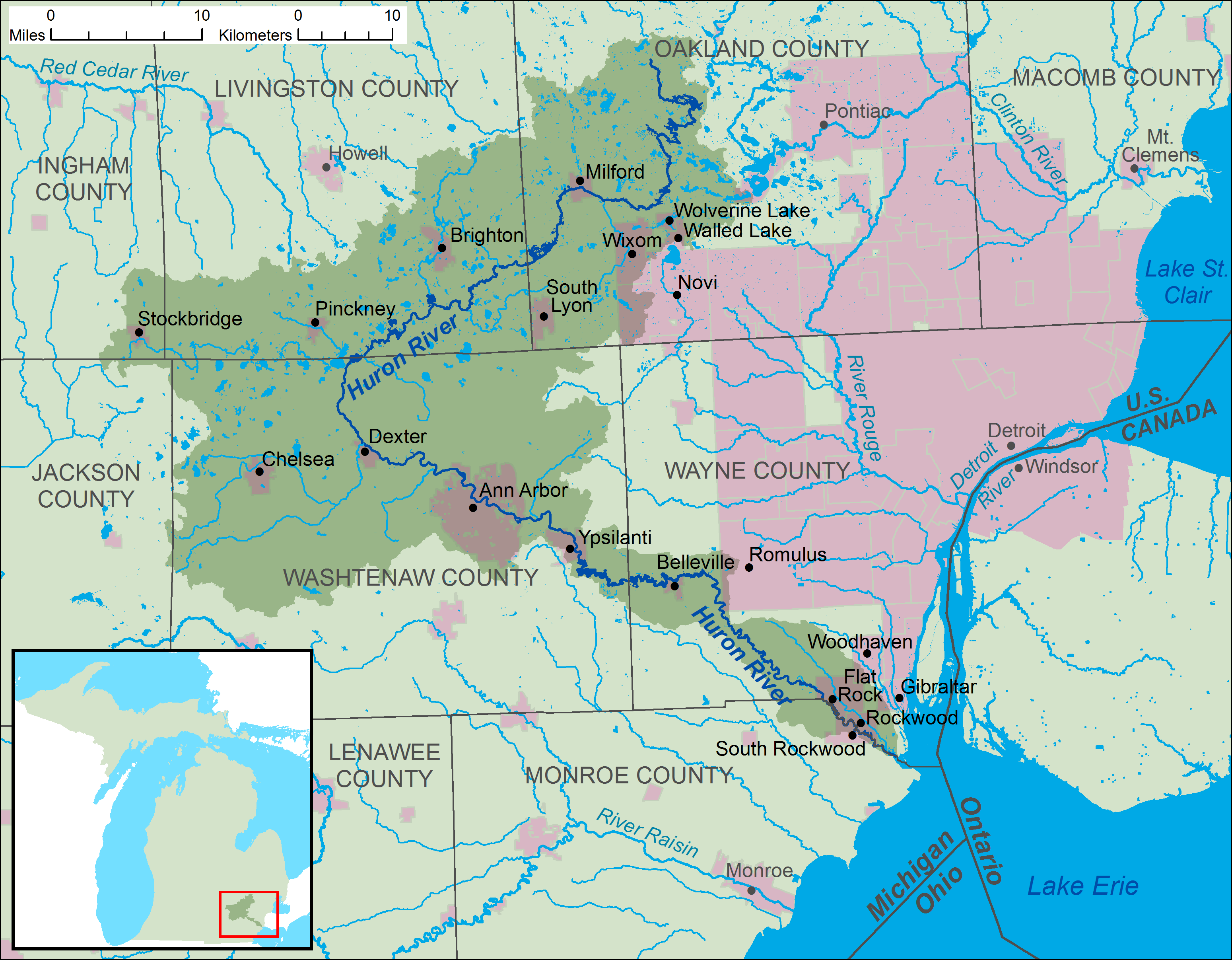
The Huron Valley region could also be defined as the Huron River's watershed.

The Huron Valley is a region of the U.S. State of Michigan. It roughly corresponds to a region west of Metro Detroit, comprising most of Washtenaw County and south-western Oakland County, and extending to include some surrounding areas, such as Van Buren Township.

It is centered around the Huron River, and its key population centers include Ann Arbor, Ypsilanti, Saline, Dexter, Belleville, and Milford.

It is named for the Huron River, which flows through the region, hence the name. Although Michigan is largely of flat terrain, the Huron Valley could be considered a true valley due to the elevation surrounding the Huron River, in areas like Ypsilanti.

== Education ==
University of Michigan's Ann Arbor campus and Eastern Michigan University are both within the Huron Valley region.

The Huron Valley School District is named after the region, and covers the area surrounding Milford.

Huron Valley Catholic School is loctated in Ypsilanti.

== Law ==
The Women's Huron Valley Correctional Facility is located in Pittsfield Township.
