= Milford High School (Michigan) =

Public secondary school in Michigan, US

Location
- 2380 South Milford Road; Highland Township, Michigan 48357; United States; 42°37′05″N 83°37′22″W

Information
- Type: Public high school
- Established: 1861
- School district: Huron Valley Schools
- Superintendent: Paul Salah
- CEEB code: 232595
- NCES School ID: 261899005574
- Principal: Kevin McKenna
- Teaching staff: 70.50 (on full-time equivalent (FTE) basis)
- Grades: 9-12
- Enrollment: 1,247 (2025-2026)
- Student to teacher ratio: 20.20
- Campus type: Rural
- Colors: Cardinal Red and White
- Fight song: Varsity
- Athletics conference: Lakes Valley Conference
- Mascot: Bruce Maverick
- Nickname: Mavericks
- Rival: Lakeland High School
- Newspaper: The Milford Messenger
- Website: www.hvs.org/o/milford

Student assessments
- 2021–22 school year Change vs. prior year

M-STEP 11th grade proficiency rates (Science / Social Studies)
- Advanced %: 28.3 / 14.3
- Proficient %: 35.5 / 39.8
- PR. Proficient %: 15.4 / 38.8
- Not Proficient %: 20.8 / 7.1

Average test scores
- SAT Total: 964.8 (▼ −18.6)

Milford High School, a public secondary school in the Huron Valley School District, serving students in ninth through twelfth grades. It is located in Highland Township in Oakland County, Michigan. The school was founded in 1861. After over a century in Milford, the school moved to its present location in Highland Township in 1956. The new high school would survive the 1976 opening of Lakeland High School and has been renovated and expanded several times since. The athletic teams were originally called the Trojans when the school was located in downtown Milford, Michigan. Later the teams were renamed "the Redskins." The mascot was later changed to the Mavericks during the 2002–2003 school year which in turn meant the last graduating class for the Redskins was in 2005. The new athletic team name—the Mavericks—was adopted after a school-wide vote.

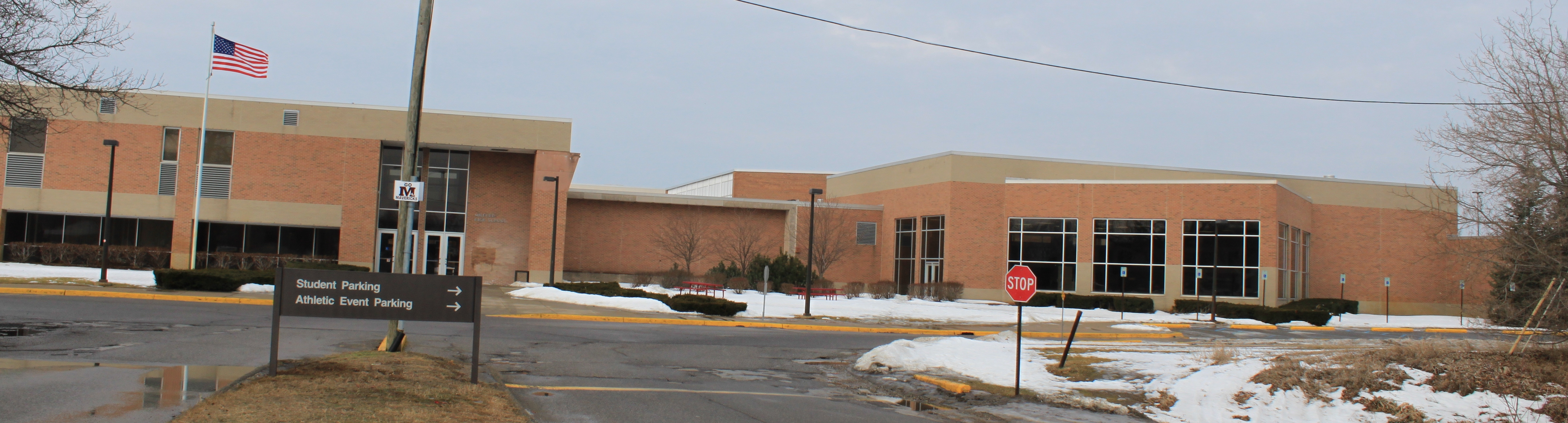
Milford High School

The school colors are officially cardinal red and white; however, other colors have been featured prominently in athletic uniforms over the years, including maroon, gold, silver, and black.

During the late 1980s and through the 1990s, Milford excelled in a variety of sports. This trend started when the baseball team finished as state runners-up in 1989. In 1989/90 the men's basketball team had an undefeated regular season and finished 23-1. (That team also featured 5 starters with a GPA above 3.75.) The 1990s also produced several All-State Cross Country and Track athletes, along with Milford's first Class A state championship in Equestrian.

== Extracurricular activities ==
The football team is in the West Division of the Kensington Lakes Activities Association. Milford lost in the elite 8 of the MSHAA Division 1 Football playoffs to Rockford High School 21–14 in 2006. Milford has consistently been a Track & Field and Cross Country powerhouse. Consistently producing the area's top distance runners. Recently the boys Milford High School Cross Country Team has also won five division 1 state championships (2003, 2004, 2011, 2012, 2013). Milford was named cross country team of the decade (2000–2009). In 2014 the Girls Volleyball Team won the district title after defeating District host Hartland in five sets. The team went on to the regional semifinals, losing to rival Lakeland in five sets.

The surrounding area's growth has allowed Milford (and sister school Lakeland) to expand the athletics programs further in recent years. After adding a large field house and pool complex, Milford now has a competitive swim and dive team. Milford offers Varsity Sports letters in a very wide range of sports including:

- Baseball,
- Football,
- Basketball,
- Softball,
- Track and Field,
- Cross Country,
- Wrestling,
- Volleyball (Women's),
- Golf,
- Soccer,
- Tennis,
- Ski,
- Lacrosse,
- Equestrian,
- Swim and Dive
- and returning for the 2014–15 season after a hiatus of one year Hockey.

The school's business-oriented club, DECA, is also very successful with many of its students reaching national competitions. Recently, Milford placed four students in the top 20 internationally at the International Competition in 2009. The H.O.T. (Heroes of Tomorrow) FIRST Robotics Competition team, with the extensive help of General Motors engineers, finished first at the 2005, 2009, and 2010 FIRST Championship. This team is a combination team between students from Milford and Lakeland High School, the other main high school within Huron Valley.

The Vocal Music Program at Milford High School began in the 1960s under the direction of James Cutty. He created the vocal ensemble now known as Center Stage. As the program grew in popularity, an all-female advanced group names Choraleers formed. The program expanded again in 2006 under Maryann Lambrecht with the regrowth of Concert Choir and the addition of Men's Ensemble. The Vocal Music program produces many different shows every year, with the POPS performance in Spring, and an end-of-the-year performance of each Choir in May/June.

Milford High School's theatre company puts on three shows every year starting with a Musical in the Fall, a Drama in the Winter, and a student-led production in the Spring. The current director is Megan Weeks.

Kevin McKenna serves as Milford High School's Principal as of Fall 2025.

== Notable alumni ==
- Valerie Gerrard Browne (born 1940), archivist and caretaker of the works of Archibald Motley.
- Bryan Clutterbuck (1959-2016), former MLB pitcher for the Milwaukee Brewers.
- Danny Davis (born 1988), Olympic snowboarder.
- Andrew Dawson (born 1995, class of 2013), American social media personality better known as TooTurntTony
- Mary Jackson (1910-2005, class of 1927), actress.
- Richard Pursel (born 1964, class of 1982), animator
- Chad Readler (born 1972, class of 1990), federal judge
- Karly Shorr (born 1994), Olympic snowboarder who competed in the 2014 Winter Olympics.
- Matt Wayne (born 1964, class of 1982), animator
