= Herman H. Dignan =

American politician (1890–1956)

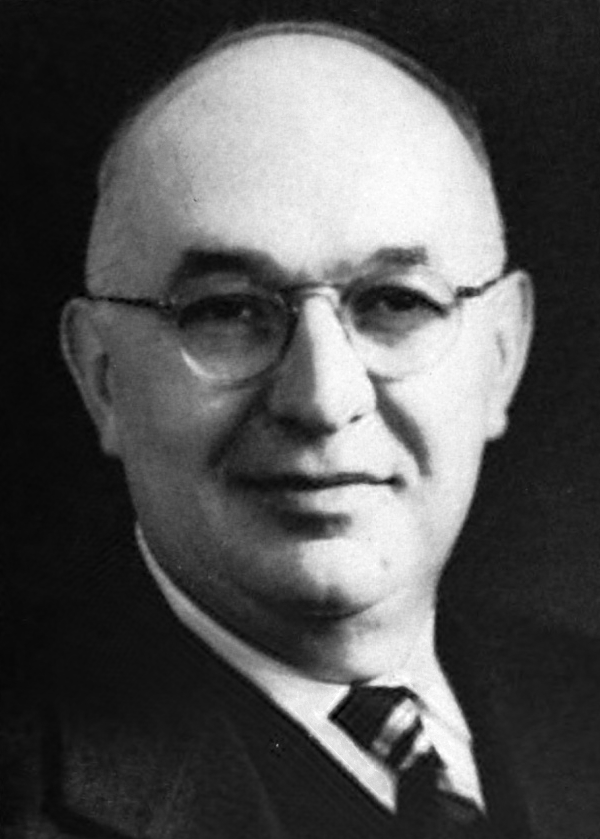

Michigan Secretary of State
- In office 1943–1946
- Preceded by: Harry F. Kelly
- Succeeded by: Fred M. Alger Jr.

Member of the Michigan Senate from the 15th district
- In office January 1, 1939 – 1942
- Preceded by: Edward W. Fehling
- Succeeded by: Murl Holcomb DeFoe

Member of the Michigan House of Representatives from the Shiawassee County district
- In office January 1, 1935 – 1938

Personal details
- Born: Herman Henry Dignan; November 6, 1890 Saginaw, Michigan, U.S.
- Died: 1956 (aged 65–66)
- Party: Republican
- Spouse: Nell T. "Nelly" Haley

Herman Henry Dignan (November 6, 1890 – 1956) was an American politician who served as the 35th Secretary of State of Michigan from 1943 to 1946 as a member of the Republican Party. He previously served in both chambers of the Michigan Legislature.

== Early life ==
Dignan was born on November 6, 1890, in Saginaw, Michigan. Dignan attended public schools in Frankenmuth, Michigan.

== Career ==
Dignan worked as a hardware dealer. On November 6, 1934, Dignan was elected as a member of the Michigan House of Representatives from the Shiawassee County district. He served in this position from January 2, 1935, to 1938. On November 8, 1939, he was elected as a member of the Michigan Senate from the 15th district. He served in this position from January 4, 1939, to 1942. Dignan was a delegate to Republican National Convention from Michigan in 1940 and 1944. Dignan served as Michigan Secretary of State from 1943 to 1946.

== Personal life ==
Dignan married Nell T. "Nelly" Haley in 1913 in Flint, Michigan. Dignan was a member of the Freemasons and the Shriners. Dignan was Congregationalist.

== Death ==
Dignan died in 1956 and was interred at Oak Hill Cemetery in Owosso, Michigan.
