= Nancy Cassis =

American politician

Member of the Michigan Senate from the 15th district
- In office January 1, 2003 – December 31, 2010
- Preceded by: Bill Bullard, Jr.
- Succeeded by: Mike Kowall

Member of the Michigan House of Representatives from the 38th district
- In office January 1, 1997 – December 31, 2002
- Preceded by: Bill Bullard, Jr.
- Succeeded by: Craig DeRoche

Personal details
- Born: Nancy Cunningham; January 26, 1944 New York, U.S.
- Died: June 11, 2024 (aged 80) Fort Lauderdale, Florida, U.S.
- Party: Republican
- Spouse: Victor Cassis
- Children: 7

Nancy Cunningham Cassis (January 26, 1944 – June 11, 2024) was an American politician and psychologist.

Cassis was born in 1944 in New York. As a Michigan Senator who initially ran against Dick DeVos, she dropped out of the contest before Michigan's 2006 gubernatorial Republican primary. In the Michigan Senate she served as the Majority Caucus Chairperson and introduced the Michigan Business Tax, which was eventually repealed by conservative governor Rick Snyder.

Cassis is a Novi resident who represented the 15th district.

She has a B.A. from Ohio University, where she graduated summa cum laude and Phi Beta Kappa. She earned her M.S. and Ed.S. degrees from the University of Michigan in Ann Arbor, Michigan. The Senator was a teacher from 1966 to 1968 for the Ohio Public Schools. She also was a psychologist for the Novi Community Schools from 1980 to 1996.

Nancy Cassis waged an unsuccessful write-in campaign to be the Republican nominee for the United States House of Representatives in District 11. Incumbent Thad McCotter was ineligible due to forged signatures. Cassis had pledged to spend at least 200,000 dollars in order to defeat balloted candidate Kerry Bentivolio in the Republican primary. Some Cassis supporters had doubts that Bentivolio would win the general election, while some Bentivolio supporters viewed the Cassis write-in campaign as an effort by establishment Republicans to block the election of a conservative. Bentivolio was elected to Congress.

== Death ==
She died in Fort Lauderdale, Florida on June 11, 2024, aged 80.
