= Craig DeRoche =

American politician (born 1970)

Craig M. DeRoche

Minority Leader of the Michigan House of Representatives
- In office January 1, 2007 – December 31, 2008

69th Speaker of the Michigan House of Representatives
- In office January 12, 2005 – December 31, 2006
- Governor: Jennifer Granholm
- Preceded by: Rick Johnson
- Succeeded by: Andy Dillon

Member of the Michigan House of Representatives from the 38th district
- In office January 1, 2003 – December 31, 2008
- Preceded by: Nancy Cassis
- Succeeded by: Hugh D. Crawford

Personal details
- Born: October 4, 1970 (age 55)
- Party: Republican
- Children: 3
- Education: Central Michigan University

Craig M. DeRoche (born October 4, 1970) is a Republican Party politician who served as speaker of the Michigan House of Representatives for the U.S. state of Michigan. Before being elected to the House of Representatives, DeRoche was a member of the Novi City Council.

DeRoche was first elected to the lower house of the Michigan Legislature to represent the 38th District in the general election on November 5, 2002. He was a member from January 1, 2003, to January 1, 2009. In 2005, after being elected to a second term in the November 2, 2004, general election, DeRoche was elected speaker of the House. He served as speaker until the Democrats won a political majority in the general election on November 7, 2006.

From 2007 until leaving the House of Representatives due to term limitations in 2009, he was the Republican leader.

During the 2008 presidential election campaign, DeRoche was co-chairman of former Massachusetts Governor Mitt Romney's campaign in Michigan.

In 2010, DeRoche announced that he would not run for the 18th Senate District seat held by Nancy Cassis, who was prohibited by term limitations from seeking re-election to a third term. After leaving office, he endorsed then-Congressman C. Peter Hoekstra in his 2010 campaign for governor of Michigan.

DeRoche was arrested on charges of suspected drunk driving on February 9, 2010, in Saline, Michigan.

On March 10, 2010, after an investigation by the Saline City Attorney, DeRoche was charged with one count of first-offense operating a vehicle while intoxicated, a misdemeanor.

On June 27, 2010, DeRoche was arrested for allegedly being intoxicated and carrying a gun. The charge was dismissed by the Michigan Court of Appeals as DeRoche was not actually carrying a gun at the time in question. The ruling stated DeRoche "was not engaging in an unlawful behavior nor were there any facts to suggest that (DeRoche) possessed the handgun for any unlawful purposes."

In 2011, DeRoche was hired as Director of External Affairs for Justice Fellowship. DeRoche became president of Justice Fellowship in 2012. DeRoche is currently Senior Vice President, Advocacy & Public Policy, with Prison Fellowship.

== Personal life ==
DeRoche is a 1993 graduate of the Michigan Political Leadership Program at Michigan State University. He currently serves on the Board of Advisers for the program.

== Electoral history ==
- 2006 House of Representatives (38th District) General Election
  - Craig DeRoche (R), 59%
  - Tim Jarrell (D), 40%
  - Other, 1%
- 2004 House of Representatives (38th District) General Election
  - Craig DeRoche (R), 61%
  - Joan Morgan (D), 38%
- 2002 House of Representatives (38th District) General Election
  - Craig DeRoche (R), 68%
  - Linda E. Premo (D), 31%
