= Steve Frisbie =

American politician

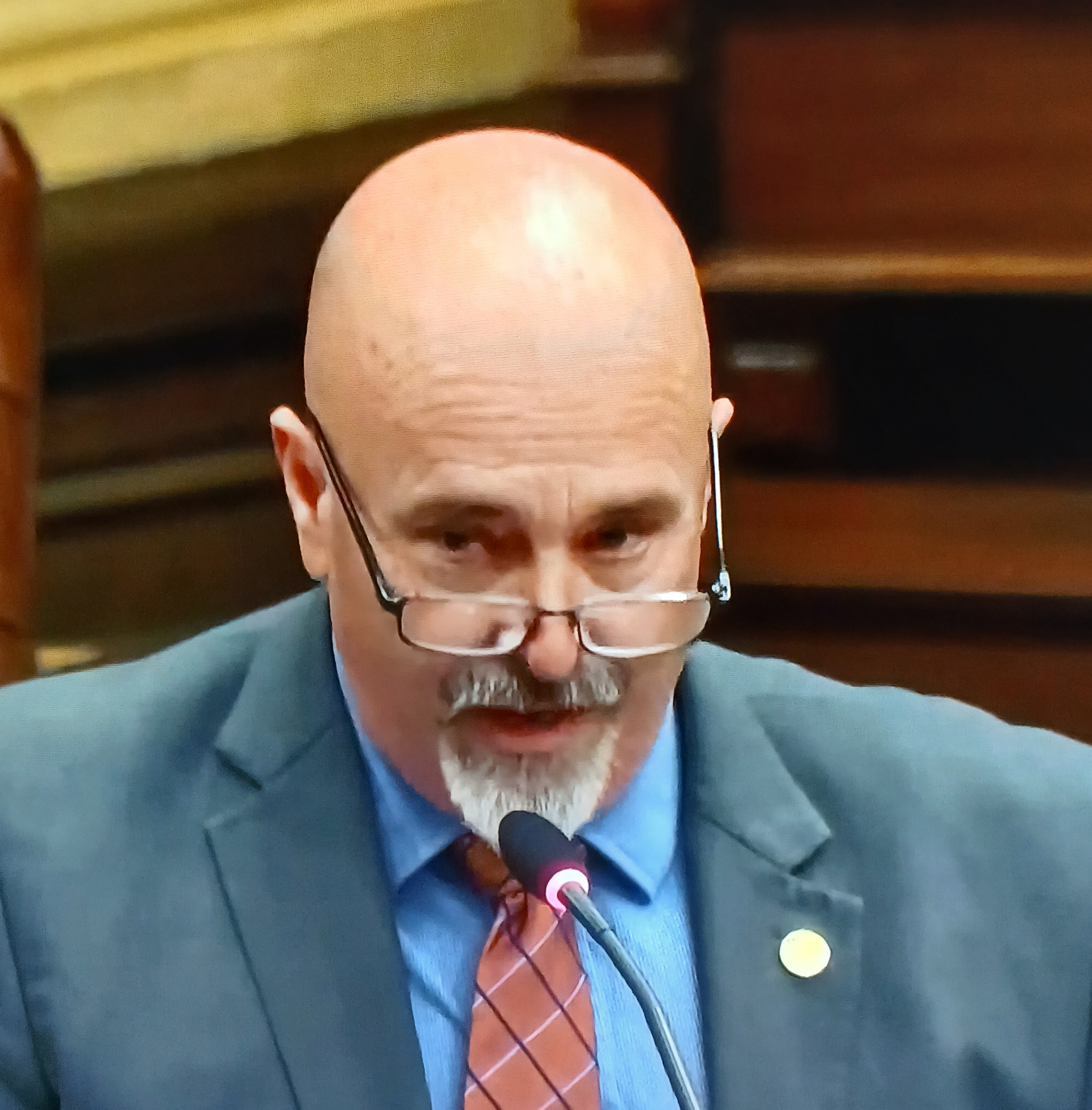
- Rep. Steve Frisbie speaking at the Michigan State Capitol, 2025

Member of the Michigan House of Representatives from the 44th district
- Incumbent
- Assumed office January 1, 2025
- Preceded by: Jim Haadsma

Member of the Calhoun County Board of Commissioners
- In office January 1, 2011 – January 1, 2025

Personal details
- Party: Republican
- Education: The Robert B. Miller College

Steve Frisbie is an American businessman and politician serving as a member of the Michigan House of Representatives since January 2025, representing the 44th district. He is a member of the Republican Party.

== Political career ==
Frisbie is a businessman and paramedic. He is the vice-president of LifeCare Ambulance from Pennfield Township.

Frisbie was Calhoun County Commissioner having first taken the seat in 2011, elected from the 4th district. He spent 13 years on the commission. He was the commission's vice chairman. He was then chairman from 2019 to 2023.

Frisbie was a delegate to the 2020 Republican National Convention, where he voted to nominate Donald Trump for president.

In the November 2024 election, Frisbie defeated incumbent Representative Jim Haadsma, a Democrat. The Associated Press projected Frisbie as the winner on Election Night (when he was up by some 1,400 votes), but the Calhoun County clerk subsequently found that a computer glitch in Battle Creek overrode 2,800 ballots, causing them not to be counted. The tabulation of those votes diminished Frisbie's margin to 58 votes. Frisbie sued in a bid to block tabulation of absentee ballots. A court dismissed Frisbie's suit, and the ballots were counted. Following the county canvass, Frisbie's lead extended to 61 votes. In the subsequent hand recount of all votes, Frisbie ultimately won by a very tight margin: 79 votes.
