= Edward W. Fehling =

American politician

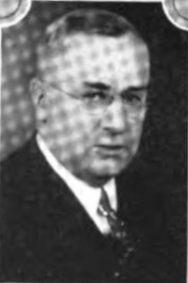

Member of the Michigan Senate from the 15th district
- In office 1935–1938
- Preceded by: Henry C. Glasner
- Succeeded by: Herman H. Dignan

Personal details
- Born: June 27, 1880 Watertown, Wisconsin
- Died: August 10, 1957 (aged 77) Clinton County, Michigan
- Party: Republican
- Spouse: Mary G. Boyle
- Profession: Attorney, bank director

Edward William Fehling (1880-1957) was a Michigan politician and a member of the Michigan State Senate from 1935 to 1938, representing the old 15th District.

== Background and personal information ==
Fehling was born to Otto and Helen Fehling on June 27, 1880, in Watertown, Wisconsin. On June 7, 1908, he married Mary G. Boyle. He died in Clinton County, Michigan on August 10, 1957.

== Political and professional career ==
From 1915 to 1920, Fehling was the prosecuting attorney for Clinton County. He served in the Michigan State Senate from 1935 to 1938, and was a delegate to the 1936 Republican National Convention. In 1938, he was an unsuccessful candidate for the Republican nomination for Lieutenant Governor of Michigan. He was also an unsuccessful candidate for the nomination for Circuit Court Judge in 1941.

Fehling worked as a director and attorney for the Farmers State Savings Bank, and for the State Bank of St. Johns in St. Johns, Michigan. He was a member of the Freemasons, the Knights Templar, the Order of the Eastern Star, the Odd Fellows and the Grange.
