= Eileen Kowall =

American politician (born 1952)

The Honorable Eileen Kowall

Member of the Michigan House of Representatives from the 44th district
- In office January 1, 2009 – December 31, 2014
- Preceded by: John P. Stakoe
- Succeeded by: Jim Runestad

Personal details
- Born: January 5, 1952 (age 74) Detroit, Michigan
- Party: Republican
- Spouse: Mike Kowall
- Education: University of Detroit
- Occupation: Politician, Dental Hygiene practitioner, businesswoman

Eileen Kowall (born January 5, 1952) is an American politician, dental hygiene practitioner, and business woman from Michigan. Kowall is a former member of Michigan House of Representatives. Kowall is the current county commissioner of Oakland County, Michigan.

== Education ==
Kowall attended Wayne State University. In 1974, Kowall earned an Associate of Arts degree in Dental Hygiene from University of Detroit. Kowall completed the Michigan Excellence in Public Service series.

== Career ==
In 1974, Kowall became a dental hygiene practitioner, until 1989.

In 1989, Kowall became a business woman as a co-owner, Sales representative and designer of Accurate Woodworking, Incorporate in Waterford, Michigan, until 2004.

On November 4, 2008, Kowall won the election and became a Republican member of Michigan House of Representatives for District 44. Kowall defeated Mark Venie with 66.60% of the votes. On November 2, 2010, as an incumbent, Kowall won the election and continued serving District 44. On November 6, 2012, as an incumbent, Kowall won the election and continued serving District 44. Kowall defeated Tom Crawford and Scott Poquette with 62.79% of the votes.

Kowall's husband, Mike, serves in the Michigan Senate, making them the first married couple to serve in the Legislature at the same time in 25 years (John Engler and Colleen House were the last). Eileen was known to be more conservative than her husband Mike.

In November 2014, Kowall won the election and became a county commissioner of Oakland County, Michigan for District 6. In November 2018, as an incumbent. Kowall won the election and continued serving as a county commissioner of Oakland County, Michigan for District 6. Kowall's term will expire in December 2020.

== Personal life ==
Kowall's husband is Mike Kowall. They have two children. Kowall and her family live in Waterford Township, Michigan.

== See also ==
- 2008 Michigan House of Representatives election
- 2010 Michigan House of Representatives election
