= Athletics at the 2018 Summer Youth Olympics – Girls' 100 metre hurdles =

Olympics

Girls' 100 metre hurdles at the III Summer Youth Olympic Games
- Venue: Parque Polideportivo Roca
- Date: 11, 14 October
- Competitors: 20 from 20 nations

Medalists
1st place, gold medalist(s)		Grace Stark	United States
2nd place, silver medalist(s)		Sophie White	Australia
3rd place, bronze medalist(s)		Ackera Nugent	Jamaica

The girls' 100 metre hurdles competition at the 2018 Summer Youth Olympics was held on 11 and 14 October, at the Parque Polideportivo Roca.

== Schedule ==
All times are in local time (UTC-3).

Date	Time	Round
Thursday, 11 October 2018	15:55	Stage 1
Sunday, 14 October 2018	14:25	Stage 2

== Results ==
=== Stage 1 ===
Rank	Heat	Lane	Athlete	Nation	Result	Notes
1	1	2	Grace Stark	United States	13.31	QH3, PB.
2	1	7	Sophie White	Australia	13.39	QH3
3	2	2	Ackera Nugent	Jamaica	13.45	QH3
4	2	3	Johanna Plank	Austria	13.71	QH3
5	3	5	Lin Ting-wei	Chinese Taipei	13.79	QH3
6	3	8	Keily Linet Pérez Ibáñez	Cuba	13.96	QH3
7	1	5	Angele Pitz	France	13.98	QH3
8	1	6	Ditaji Kambundji	Switzerland	13.98	QH3
9	2	5	Sarah Belle	Barbados	14.06	QH2
10	2	8	Aimara Nazareno	Ecuador	14.10	QH2
10	3	7	Kayla van den Berg	South Africa	14.10	QH2
12	3	3	María Fernanda Patrón Noguera	Mexico	14.14	QH2
13	3	6	Antonia Buschendorf	Germany	14.16	QH2
14	1	3	Viktoryia Kharavitskaya	Belarus	14.39	QH2
15	2	7	Elīza Kraule	Latvia	14.45	QH2
16	1	8	Monika Romaszko	Poland	14.49	QH2
17	1	4	Fanni Bacsa	Hungary	14.64	QH1
18	2	6	Isabel Velasco	Spain	15.31	QH1
19	2	4	Bianca Elena Toader	Romania	18.95	QH1
	3	2	Olivia Gee	Canada	DQ	R 168.7, QH1
	3	4	Daniela Mena	Colombia	DNS	QH1

=== Stage 2 ===
Rank	Heat	Lane	Athlete	Nation	Result	Notes
1	3	4	Grace Stark	United States	12.83	
2	3	6	Ackera Nugent	Jamaica	12.96	
3	3	5	Sophie White	Australia	13.01	
4	3	3	Johanna Plank	Austria	13.40	
5	3	7	Lin Ting-wei	Chinese Taipei	13.47	
6	3	8	Keily Linet Pérez Ibáñez	Cuba	13.49	
7	2	5	María Fernanda Patrón Noguera	Mexico	13.68	PB
8	2	4	Aimara Nazareno	Ecuador	13.73	PB
9	2	7	Antonia Buschendorf	Germany	13.75	
10	3	2	Angele Pitz	France	13.77	
11	1	3	Fanni Bacsa	Hungary	13.89	
12	2	8	Viktoryia Kharavitskaya	Belarus	14.01	
13	2	3	Kayla van den Berg	South Africa	14.13	
14	2	1	Elīza Kraule	Latvia	14.14	
15	2	2	Monika Romaszko	Poland	14.14	
16	2	6	Sarah Belle	Barbados	14.32	
17	3	1	Ditaji Kambundji	Switzerland	14.44	
18	1	5	Isabel Velasco	Spain	15.78	
	1	6	Bianca Elena Toader	Romania	DNS	
	1	7	Olivia Gee	Canada	DNS	
	1	4	Daniela Mena	Colombia	DNS	

=== Final placing ===
Rank	Athlete	Nation	Stage 1	Stage 2	Total
1st place, gold medalist(s)	Grace Stark	United States	13.31	12.83	26.14
2nd place, silver medalist(s)	Sophie White	Australia	13.39	13.01	26.40
3rd place, bronze medalist(s)	Ackera Nugent	Jamaica	13.45	12.96	26.41
4	Johanna Plank	Austria	13.71	13.40	27.11
5	Lin Ting-wei	Chinese Taipei	13.79	13.47	27.26
6	Keily Linet Pérez Ibáñez	Cuba	13.96	13.49	27.45
7	Angele Pitz	France	13.98	13.77	27.75
8	María Fernanda Patrón Noguera	Mexico	14.14	13.68	27.82
9	Aimara Nazareno	Ecuador	14.10	13.73	27.83
10	Antonia Buschendorf	Germany	14.16	13.75	27.91
11	Kayla van den Berg	South Africa	14.10	14.13	28.23
12	Sarah Belle	Barbados	14.06	14.32	28.38
13	Viktoryia Kharavitskaya	Belarus	14.39	14.01	28.40
14	Ditaji Kambundji	Switzerland	13.98	14.44	28.42
15	Fanni Bacsa	Hungary	14.64	13.89	28.53
16	Elīza Kraule	Latvia	14.45	14.14	28.59
17	Monika Romaszko	Poland	14.49	14.14	28.63
18	Isabel Velasco	Spain	15.31	15.78	31.09
	Bianca Elena Toader	Romania	18.95	DNS	
	Olivia Gee	Canada	DQ	DNS	
	Daniela Mena	Colombia	DNS	DNS	
