= Hugh Crawford (politician) =

American politician (born 1941)

Hugh D. Crawford

Oakland County Board of Commissioners
- In office January 1, 2015 – January 1, 2019
- Preceded by: Kathy Crawford
- Succeeded by: Gwen Markham

Member of the Michigan House of Representatives from the 38th district
- In office January 1, 2009 – December 31, 2014
- Preceded by: Craig DeRoche
- Succeeded by: Kathy Crawford

Personal details
- Born: October 23, 1941 (age 84) Novi, Michigan, U.S.
- Party: Republican
- Spouse: Kathy Crawford

Military service
- Branch: U.S. Marine Corps

Hugh D. Crawford (born October 23, 1941) is a Republican politician from Michigan who served on the Oakland County, Michigan Board of Commissioners as the Commissioner for District 9 which includes the cities of Novi, Northville, and the Township of Novi. Crawford is a former member of the Michigan House of Representatives where he served for three terms. He was the chairman of the powerful Committee on Regulatory Reform where he was a key player in enacting the reform policies pushed by Michigan Governor Rick Snyder.

Prior to his election to the House, Crawford was mayor of Novi from 1996–2000, and had also previously served on the city's council.
