= Kathy Crawford =

American politician (born 1942)

Kathy S. Crawford

Member of the Michigan House of Representatives from the 38th district
- In office January 1, 2015 – January 1, 2021
- Preceded by: Hugh Crawford
- Succeeded by: Kelly Breen

Oakland County Board of Commissioners County Commissioner
- In office January 1, 2010 – December 31, 2014
- Preceded by: Kim Capello
- Succeeded by: Hugh Crawford

Personal details
- Born: March 15, 1942 (age 84) Novi, MI
- Party: Republican
- Spouse: Hugh
- Committees: House Committee on Families, Children, and Seniors, House Committee on Health Policy, House Committee on Regulatory Reform, House Committee on Workforce and Talent Development
- Website: State Rep. Kathy Crawford

Kathy S. Crawford (born March 15, 1942) is an American author, business owner, and Republican politician from Michigan who served in the Michigan House of Representatives representing District 38. Crawford is a former member of the Oakland County Board of Commissioners where she served for two terms before running to replace her husband Hugh in the Michigan House once he became term limited. She worked as a professional in the Field of Aging for more than 30 years in Oakland County. She retired from the City of Novi in 2004 to launch her own business, Kathy Crawford Communications.

Prior to her election to the Oakland County Board of Commissioners, Crawford served on the Novi City Council.

== Early life ==
During her youth, Crawford lived on two different farms in the days before extensive commercial and residential development came to Novi. Her farms were at 12 Mile and Haggerty, and at Grand River and Meadowbrook. Throughout much of her younger life, Crawford's family was routinely on the move. Her family moved three times and subsequently Crawford attended elementary schools in Northville, Wixom and Walled Lake. Although she lived within the limits of the City of Novi at the time and because Novi High School had yet to be built, Crawford attended both Farmington High School and Farmington Middle School. In the early 1960s, Kathy Crawford met her future husband Hugh. Hugh and Kathy Crawford were married on September 26, 1964 at the Novi Methodist Church where they both attended.

== Professional life ==
Crawford worked as a professional in the field of aging for more than 30 years in Oakland County. Crawford was one of the founders of the Michigan Association of Senior Centers, assisted the State of Michigan in writing the rules to certify professionals in the field of aging and was Michigan's second senior center director to become certified. In addition, she was appointed by former Michigan Attorney General Mike Cox to conduct workshops for citizens regarding Identity Theft. She retired from the City of Novi in 2004 to launch her own business, Kathy Crawford Communications. Crawford has authored several workbooks for senior center directors along with authoring her memoir titled "Two Broads Abroad."

== Public Offices and Affiliations ==
Crawford was elected to the Novi City Council in 2007. In 2010, she was elected to the Oakland County Commission representing the 9th District of Northville and Novi where she served until her election to the Michigan House. Crawford also has served on the board for the Novi Pavilion Shores Conservancy, Novi Library Fundraising Committee. She remains a Novi Library Friends volunteer and Novi Senior Theater cast member and continues to be the Master of Ceremonies for the annual Senior Variety Show. She is past chair and member of the Novi Retirees Association, and is a member of the American Business Women's Association. She is currently the chair of Novi's Historical Commission and is vice president of the Novi Library Board of Trustees.

== 2014 Michigan House Election ==
District 38 in the Michigan House represents the cities of Novi, Northville, Walled Lake, South Lyon, Lyon Township, New Hudson, and Novi Township. After serving for three consecutive terms, incumbent State Rep. Hugh Crawford was term limited and unable to seek another term in the Michigan House. In July 2013, Kathy Crawford announced her candidacy for the position of State Representative for the 38th District, the seat held at the time by her husband. During the election, she garnered the support of dozens of public officials from throughout the State of Michigan and Oakland County - mayors, council members, business leaders. Many opposing voices cited what they called the "Crawford Dynasty" and encouraged voters to seek new voices in the Michigan Legislature. On November 4, 2014, Kathy Crawford was elected to the Michigan House of Representatives winning 62% of the vote.

== State representative ==
Kathy Crawford was inaugurated into office on January 2, 2015 by Michigan Supreme Court Justice David Viviano on the floor of the Michigan House in a ceremony with her friends and family. She currently serves on four House Committees: Families, Children, and Seniors, Health Policy, Regulatory Reform, and Workforce and Talent Development. Rep. Crawford is a supporter of a statewide Master Plan for older active adults and senior citizens in Michigan. On March 11, 2015, Crawford made headlines by becoming one of only five Republican representatives to vote against repealing Michigan's film production subsidies.
