= Mike Kowall =

American politician (born 1951)

Majority Floor Leader of the Michigan Senate
- In office January 15, 2015 – December 31, 2018
- Preceded by: Arlan Meekhof
- Succeeded by: Peter MacGregor

Member of the Michigan Senate from the 15th district
- In office January 1, 2011 – December 31, 2018
- Preceded by: Nancy Cassis
- Succeeded by: Jim Runestad

Member of the Michigan House of Representatives from the 44th district
- In office January 1, 1999 – December 31, 2002
- Preceded by: David N. Galloway
- Succeeded by: John Stakoe

Personal details
- Born: September 10, 1951 (age 74) Detroit, Michigan
- Party: Republican
- Spouse: Eileen Kowall
- Children: Two
- Profession: Business owner

Mike Kowall (born September 10, 1951) is a former Republican member of the Michigan Senate, representing the 15th district from 2011 until 2018. He served in the Michigan House of Representatives from 1998 to 2002.

Kowall's wife, Eileen, serves in the Michigan House of Representatives, making them the first married couple to serve in the Legislature at the same time in 25 years (John Engler and Colleen House were the last).

== Electoral history ==
Michigan state House 44th District election 1998, Republican primary
Party	Candidate	Votes	%	±%
Republican	Mike Kowall	4,710	64.7	N/A
Republican	James F. McCarthy	1,829	25.1	N/A
Republican	Rick Gladstone	737	10.1	N/A
Majority		2,881	41.6	N/A
Turnout		7,276		N/A

Michigan state House 44th District election, 1998
Party	Candidate	Votes	%	±%
Republican	Mike Kowall	16,415	53.3	N/A
Democratic	Matt Hogan	14,397	46.7	N/A
Majority		2,018	6.6	N/A
Turnout		30,812		N/A
Republican hold		Swing		

Michigan state House 44th District election, 2000
Party	Candidate	Votes	%	±%
Republican	Mike Kowall (I)	26,439	61.6	+8.3
Democratic	Matthew E. Hogan III	16,477	38.4	−8.4
Majority		9,959	23.2	16.6
Turnout		42,916		+39.2
Republican hold		Swing		

Michigan state Senate 15th District election 2010, Republican primary
Party	Candidate	Votes	%	±%
Republican	Mike Kowall	16,816	53.2	N/A
Republican	Kerry Bentivolio	4,971	15.7	N/A
Republican	Paul Graves	3,554	11.3	N/A
Republican	Alan Stephens	2,881	9.1	N/A
Republican	Steven Valentini	2,045	6.5	N/A
Republican	John Cyrus Mohyi	1,318	4.2	N/A
Majority		11,845	37.5	−6.5
Turnout		31,585		+11.1%

Michigan state Senate 15th District election, 2010
Party	Candidate	Votes	%	±%
Republican	Mike Kowall	65,216	62.4	+4.8
Democratic	Pam Jackson	39,233	37.6	−2.1
Majority		25,983	24.8	+7.1
Turnout		104,449		−9.5
Republican hold		Swing		

Michigan state Senate 15th District election 2014, Republican primary
Party	Candidate	Votes	%	±%
Republican	Mike Kowall (I)	11,344	49.8	−3.4
Republican	Matt Maddock	9,721	42.7	N/A
Republican	Ron Molnar	1,707	7.5	N/A
Majority		1,623	7.1	−30.4
Turnout		22,772		−27.9

Michigan state Senate 15th District election, 2014
Party	Candidate	Votes	%	±%
Republican	Mike Kowall (I)	52,797	58.5	−3.9
Democratic	Michael D. Smith	37,489	41.5	+3.9
Majority		15,308	17.0	−7.0
Turnout		90,286		−13.6
Republican hold		Swing		

Michigan's 11th congressional district, 2018 Republican primary
Party	Candidate	Votes	%
Republican	Lena Epstein	26,925	30.9
Republican	Rocky Raczkowski	22,216	25.5
Republican	Mike Kowall	16,011	18.4
Republican	Klint Kesto	12,213	14.0
Republican	Kerry Bentivolio	9,831	11.3
Total votes		87,196	100.0
