= Michigan's 38th House of Representatives district =

American legislative district

Michigan's 38th State House of Representatives district
Representative
| Joey Andrews; D–St. Joseph |
- Demographics: 68.1% White; 18.4% Black; 6.3% Hispanic; 1.5% Asian; 0.2% Native American; 0.3% Other; 5.1% Multiracial
- Population (2024): 92,908

Michigan's 38th House of Representatives district is a legislative district within the Michigan House of Representatives located in the counties of Allegan, Berrien, and Van Buren. The district was created in 1965, when the Michigan Supreme Court ordered the reapportionment of state legislative districts from a county-based system to a proportional one following the Supreme Court case Reynolds v. Sims. It is currently represented by Democrat Joey Andrews of St. Joseph.

== List of representatives ==
| Representative | Party | Years | Residence | Notes |
|---|---|---|---|---|
| Edward E. Mahalak | Democratic | 1965–1982 | Romulus | Redistricted to the 37th district. |
| Justine Barns | Democratic | 1983–1992 | Westland | Redistricted to the 18th district. |
| Willis "Bill" C. Bullard Jr. | Republican | 1993–1996 | Milford Township | Redistricted from the 60th district; resigned June 1996 after being elected to the Michigan Senate. |
| Nancy C. Cassis | Republican | 1996 (Note: Elected in a 1996 special election to replace Rep. Willis "Bill" C. Bullard Jr., who resigned.)–2002 | Novi | Term limited. |
| Craig M. DeRoche | Republican | 2003–2008 | Novi | Term limited. |
| Hugh D. Crawford | Republican | 2009–2014 | Novi | Term limited. |
| Kathy Crawford | Republican | 2015–2020 | Novi | Term limited. |
| Kelly Breen | Democratic | 2021–2022 | Novi | Redistricted to the 21st district. |
| Joey Andrews IV | Democratic | 2023–present | St. Joseph | |

== Historical district boundaries ==
| Map | Description | Apportionment Plan | Notes |
|---|---|---|---|
| | Monroe County (part): Ash Township; Berlin Charter Township; Dundee Township; Exeter Township; Ida Township; London Township; Milan Township; Raisinville Township; Summerfield Township; Wayne County (part): Belleville; Huron Township; Romulus Township; Sumpter Township; Van Buren Township | 1964 Apportionment Plan (Note: Referred to as the Austin-Kleiner plan.) | |
| | Monroe County (part): Excluding; Bedford Township; Berlin Charter Township; Erie Township; Frenchtown Charter Township (part); La Salle Township; Luna Pier; Milan (part); Monroe; Monroe Charter Township; Wayne County (part): Huron Township; Romulus Township (part); Sumpter Township; Taylor (part); Wayne (part) | 1972 Apportionment Plan (Note: Referred to as the Hatcher-Kleiner plan.) | |
| | Wayne County (part): Westland (part) | 1982 Apportionment Plan | |
| | Oakland County (part): Lyon Township; Milford Township; Northville; Novi; Novi Township; South Lyon; Walled Lake; Wixom | 1992 Apportionment Plan | |
| | Oakland County (part): Lyon Township; Northville (part); Novi; Novi Township; South Lyon; Walled Lake; Wixom | 2001 Apportionment Plan | |
| | Oakland County (part): Lyon Township; Northville (part); Novi; Novi Township; South Lyon; Walled Lake | 2011 Apportionment Plan | |
| | Allegan County (part): Casco Township; Douglas; Ganges Township; Saugatuck; Saugatuck Township; South Haven (part); Berrien County (part): Benton Charter Township; Benton Harbor; Bridgman; Chikaming Township; Hagar Township; Lake Charter Township; Lincoln Charter Township; New Buffalo; New Buffalo Township; St. Joseph; St. Joseph Charter Township; Van Buren County (part): Covert Township; South Haven (part); South Haven Township | 2021 Apportionment Plan (Note: Referred to as the Hickory plan.) | |

== Recent elections ==
=== 2020s ===
2026 Michigan House of Representatives election
| Party | Candidate | Votes | % |
|---|---|---|---|
| Democratic | Joey Andrews (incumbent) | 25,942 | 56.74 |
| Republican | Mark Krieger | 19,207 | 42.01 |
| Green | Jett Newton | 569 | 1.24 |
| Total votes | | 45,718 | 100 |
| Democratic hold | | | |

2024 Michigan House of Representatives election
| Party | Candidate | Votes | % |
|---|---|---|---|
| Democratic | Joey Andrews (incumbent) | 28,515 | 53.15 |
| Republican | Kevin Whiteford | 25,133 | 46.85 |
| Total votes | | 53,648 | 100 |
| Democratic hold | | | |

2022 Michigan House of Representatives election
| Party | Candidate | Votes | % |
|---|---|---|---|
| Democratic | Joey Andrews | 21,757 | 51.79 |
| Republican | Kevin Whiteford | 20,252 | 48.21 |
| Total votes | | 42,009 | 100 |
| Democratic hold | | | |

2020 Michigan House of Representatives election
| Party | Candidate | Votes | % |
|---|---|---|---|
| Democratic | Kelly Breen | 31,217 | 51.62 |
| Republican | Chase Turner | 29,263 | 48.38 |
| Total votes | | 60,480 | 100 |
| Democratic gain from Republican | | | |

=== 2010s ===
2018 Michigan House of Representatives election
| Party | Candidate | Votes | % |
|---|---|---|---|
| Republican | Kathy S. Crawford (incumbent) | 22,474 | 49.44 |
| Democratic | Kelly Breen | 21,886 | 48.14 |
| Libertarian | Brian R. Wright | 1,100 | 2.42 |
| Total votes | | 45,460 | 100 |
| Republican hold | | | |

2016 Michigan House of Representatives election
| Party | Candidate | Votes | % |
|---|---|---|---|
| Republican | Kathy S. Crawford (incumbent) | 28,205 | 57.66 |
| Democratic | Amy McCusker | 20,711 | 42.34 |
| Total votes | | 48,916 | 100 |
| Republican hold | | | |

2014 Michigan House of Representatives election
| Party | Candidate | Votes | % |
|---|---|---|---|
| Republican | Kathy S. Crawford | 19,234 | 62.57 |
| Democratic | Jasper Catanzaro | 11,508 | 37.43 |
| Total votes | | 30,742 | 100 |
| Republican hold | | | |

2012 Michigan House of Representatives election
| Party | Candidate | Votes | % |
|---|---|---|---|
| Republican | Hugh D. Crawford (incumbent) | 26,460 | 59.2 |
| Democratic | Chuck Tindall | 18,235 | 40.8 |
| Total votes | | 44,695 | 100 |
| Republican hold | | | |

2010 Michigan House of Representatives election
| Party | Candidate | Votes | % |
|---|---|---|---|
| Republican | Hugh D. Crawford (incumbent) | 22,873 | 67.53 |
| Democratic | Jeffrey T. Gedeon | 10,998 | 32.47 |
| Total votes | | 33,871 | 100 |
| Republican hold | | | |

=== 2000s ===
2008 Michigan House of Representatives election
| Party | Candidate | Votes | % |
|---|---|---|---|
| Republican | Hugh D. Crawford | 27,840 | 57.54 |
| Democratic | Chuck Tindall | 20,547 | 42.46 |
| Total votes | | 48,387 | 100 |
| Republican hold | | | |

2006 Michigan House of Representatives election
| Party | Candidate | Votes | % |
|---|---|---|---|
| Republican | Craig M. DeRoche (incumbent) | 21,803 | 59.9 |
| Democratic | Tim Jarrell | 14,595 | 40.1 |
| Total votes | | 36,398 | 100 |
| Republican hold | | | |

2004 Michigan House of Representatives election
| Party | Candidate | Votes | % |
|---|---|---|---|
| Republican | Craig M. DeRoche (incumbent) | 27,406 | 61.39 |
| Democratic | Joan Morgan | 17,234 | 38.61 |
| Total votes | | 44,640 | 100 |
| Republican hold | | | |

2002 Michigan House of Representatives election
| Party | Candidate | Votes | % |
|---|---|---|---|
| Republican | Craig M. DeRoche | 18,561 | 65.05 |
| Democratic | Linda E. Premo | 9,973 | 34.95 |
| Total votes | | 28,534 | 100 |
| Republican hold | | | |

2000 Michigan House of Representatives election
| Party | Candidate | Votes | % |
|---|---|---|---|
| Republican | Nancy Cassis (incumbent) | 29,047 | 64.03 |
| Democratic | Linda E. Premo | 14,196 | 31.29 |
| Libertarian | Anne Bora | 1,095 | 2.41 |
| Reform | Joseph L. Bush, Sr | 1,030 | 2.27 |
| Total votes | | 45,368 | 100 |
| Republican hold | | | |

=== 1990s ===
1998 Michigan House of Representatives election
| Party | Candidate | Votes | % |
|---|---|---|---|
| Republican | Nancy Cassis (incumbent) | 22,207 | 71.59 |
| Democratic | Kristy Mary Demas | 8,811 | 28.41 |
| Total votes | | 31,018 | 100 |
| Republican hold | | | |
