= Kelly Breen (politician) =

American politician (born 1977)

Member of the Michigan House of Representatives
- Incumbent
- Assumed office January 1, 2019
- Preceded by: Kathy Crawford
- Constituency: 38st district (2021–2022); 21st district (2023–present)

Novi City Council
- In office November 13, 2017 – December 31, 2020
- Preceded by: Brian Burke

Personal details
- Born: August 1977 (age 49) Detroit, Michigan, U.S.
- Party: Democratic
- Spouse: Matthew
- Children: 2
- Education: Michigan State University BA); Wayne State University (JD)
- Profession: Attorney
- Committees: House Judiciary Committee; House Insurance Committee
- Website: Campaign Website

Kelly A. Hough-Breen (born August 1977) is an American politician serving as a member of the Michigan House of Representatives since 2019, currently representing the 21st district. She is a member of the Democratic Party.

== Early life and legal career ==
Breen has lived her entire life in the Metro Detroit area. She is a product of the Northville Public Schools where she was a student athlete on the soccer team. After high school, Breen attended the James Madison College at Michigan State University where she obtained a bachelor's degree in Social Relations and Policy.

Following her undergraduate career, Breen enrolled in the Wayne State University Law School where she obtained her Juris Doctor degree in 2002. After being admitted to the State Bar of Michigan in 2003, Breen formed an expansive legal career with practice areas ranging from representing minors in the foster care system to representing injured people.

At the time of her election to the Michigan House of Representatives, Breen was employed by Goodman Acker, P.C., which is one of Metro Detroit's leading law firms, where she played a role in the firm's pharmaceutical injury litigation.

== Political career ==
Breen announced her candidacy for the Novi City Council in early 2017. She ran on a slate which included incumbent council members Gwen Markham and Andrew Mutch. Breen ran on a platform of responsible development, responsive government, and bringing a fresh perspective to Novi city government.

Breen was elected to the Novi City Council in November 2017 and assumed office later that month. On the city council, Breen has served on various council committees, including the Commission Interview Committee, the Parks, Recreation and Cultural Services Grant Citizen Advisory Committee, Southeast Michigan Council of Governments (SEMCOG) (alternate), Youth Council (alternate) Capital Improvement Program. Breen has also played an active role with the Michigan Municipal League in her capacity as a city council member, where she graduated from MML's Elected Officials Academy.

Breen has also taken on a leading role in the area's prevention of human trafficking.

In her first sponsored vote on the city council in June 2018, Breen spearheaded the passage of the city of Novi's first anti-discrimination policy to protect the city's LGBTQ employees and contractors. Breen also actively supported the city's efforts to study and preserve wildlife and environmental habitats in Novi, and pushed for greater accountability for the city's sustainability priorities.

In April 2018, Breen announced her candidacy for the Michigan House of Representatives, challenging popular incumbent Kathy Crawford. Breen defeated Dr. Aditi Bagchi in the August 2018 Democratic primary with 48.8% of the total vote. Breen's campaign created a coalition of local officials, community groups, activist organizations, labor groups, and media outlets. Breen lost in the November General Election by coming just 588 votes short of beating Crawford. After the 2018 election, Breen returned to her position on the Novi City Council.

In April 2019, Breen made the decision to run for the Michigan House of Representatives once again, with incumbent representative Kathy Crawford now term limited. Breen won a primary challenge in August 2020 from Megan McAllister, a marketing coordinator from Northville. Breen went on to defeat Republican nominee Chase Turner in the November 2020 General Election, making history as the first working mother and first Democrat to be elected to represent Michigan's 38th House District in the State Legislature.

Following redistricting, Breen ran in the 21st district in 2022, winning reelection. She was reelected in 2024.
