= Huron Valley School District =

School district in Michigan, US

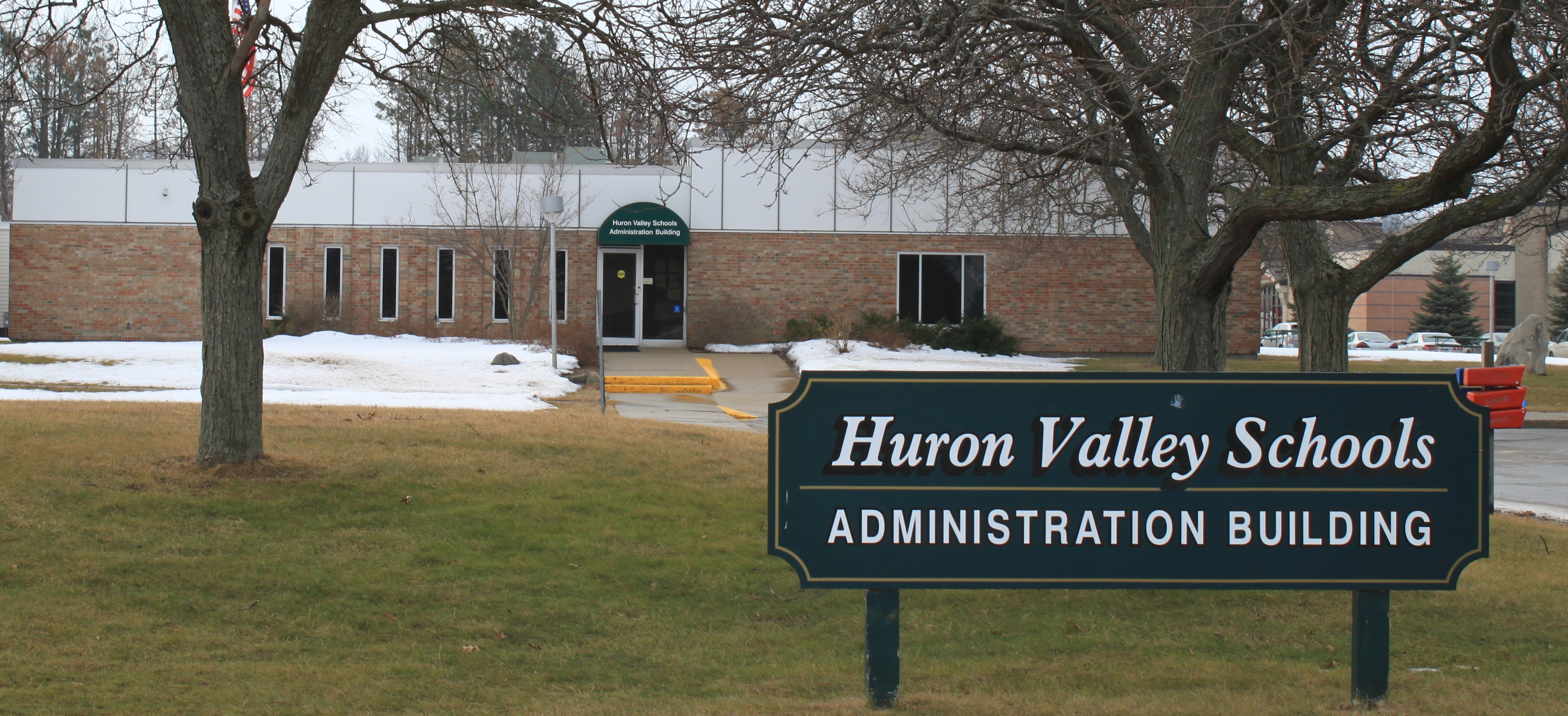
- Huron Valley Schools Administration Building

Address
- 2390 South Milford Road Highland, Oakland, Michigan, 48357; United States

District information
- Type: Public
- Grades: PreK–12
- Established: 1946
- Superintendent: Dr. Paul Salah
- Budget: $167,846,000 expenditures 2022-2023
- NCES District ID: 2618990

Students and staff
- Students: 7,687 (2024-2025)
- Teachers: 461.59 FTE (2024-2025)
- Staff: 1,140.31 FTE (2024-2025)
- Student–teacher ratio: 16.65 (2023-2024)

Other information
- Website: www.hvs.org

Huron Valley Schools is a public school district in Metro Detroit in the U.S. state of Michigan, serving Highland Township, Milford, and most of Commerce Township, Milford Township, and White Lake Township. (Note: The district's geographic area also includes a small portion of Brighton Township which is completely occupied by the General Motors Milford Proving Grounds and has no residential homes.)

== History ==
In 1869, a union school was established in Milford. In 1877, the union school graduated its first class. Beginning in the 1920s, the rural schoolhouse districts in the area began to consolidate, ultimately joining the Milford school district. The district renamed itself Huron Valley School District on September 25, 1946.

== Schools ==
Schools in Huron Valley School District
| School | Address | Notes |
High schools (Grades 9–12)
| Milford High School | 2380 S Milford Rd., Highland Twp. | Built 1955. |
| Lakeland High School | 1630 Bogie Lake Rd, White Lake Twp. | Built 1973. |
| Harbor High School | 4200 White Oak Trail., Commerce Twp. | Alternative high school. Also houses adult education program. Built 1994. |
Middle schools (Grades 6–8)
| Muir Middle School | 425 George St., Milford | Built 1964. |
| White Lake Middle School | 1450 Bogie Lake Rd, White Lake Twp. | Built 1973. |
Elementary schools (Grades K-5)
| Country Oaks Elementary | 5070 S. Duck Lake Rd., Commerce Twp. | Built 1993. |
| Heritage Elementary | 219 Watkins Blvd., Highland Twp. | Built 1998. |
| Highland Elementary | 300 W. Livingston Rd., Highland Twp. | Built 1968. |
| Johnson Elementary | 515 General Motors Rd., Milford | Built 1962. |
| Kurtz Elementary | 1350 Kurtz Dr., Milford | Built 1967. |
| Lakewood Elementary | 1500 Bogie Lake Rd., White Lake Twp. | Built 1973. |
| Oxbow Community School | 100 Oxbow Lake Rd., White Lake Twp. | Built 1967. |
| Spring Mills Elementary | 3150 Harvey Lake Rd., Highland Twp. | Built 1973. |
Other facilities
| Apollo Early Childhood Center | 2029 N. Milford Rd., Highland Twp. | Preschool. Built 1966. |
| International Academy West Campus | 1630 Bogie Lake Road, White Lake Twp. | Application-based high school for grades 9–12. Uses International Baccalaureate Middle Years and Diploma Programmes. |

=== Former schools ===
- Apollo Elementary - re-purposed
- Baker Elementary - demolished in 2013
- Highland Middle School - demolished in 2013
- Duck Lake Elementary School - Demolished in 2023
- Baker elementary, in Milford (closed)
- Brooks Elementary, in White Lake (Closed)
- Oak Valley Center, in Commerce - serves continuing education as well as Harbor High School
