= Highland Township, Oakland County, Michigan =

Highland Township, Michigan
- Charter township
- Charter Township of Highland
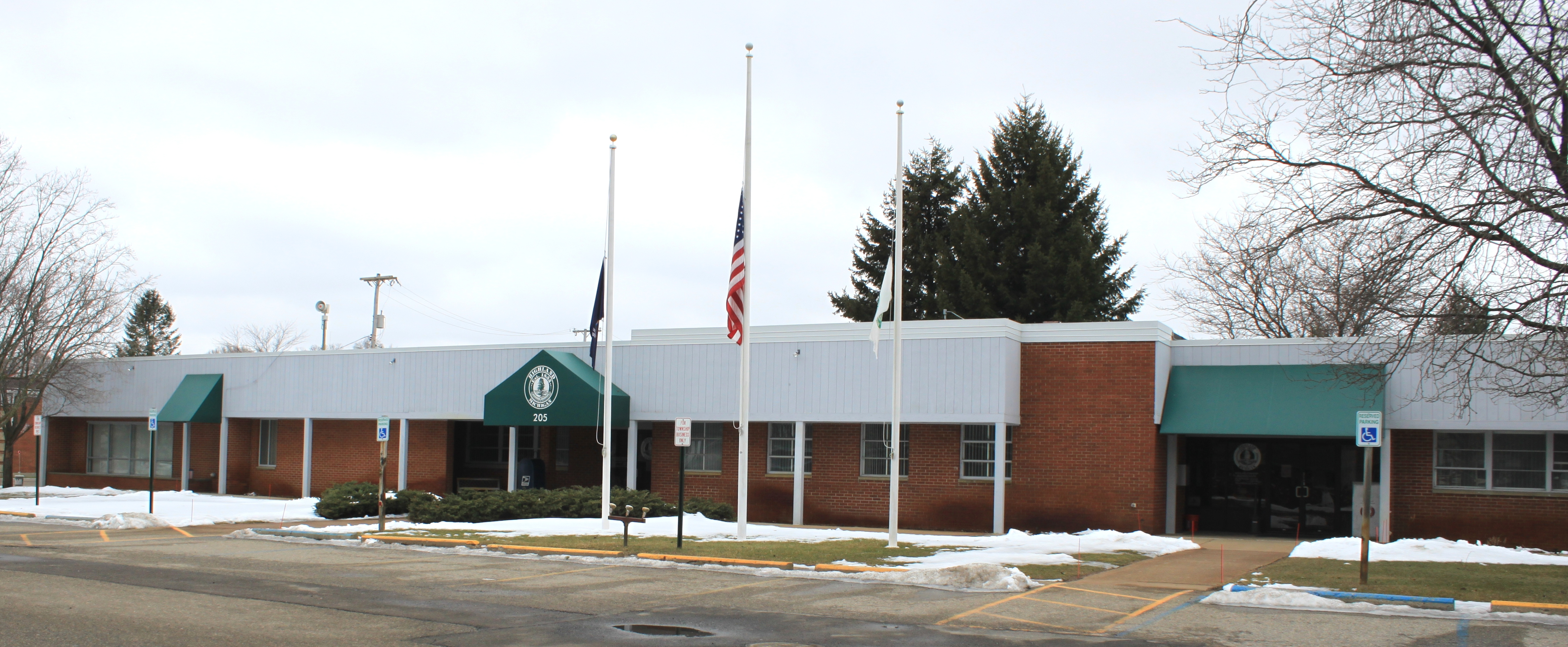
- Highland Township offices

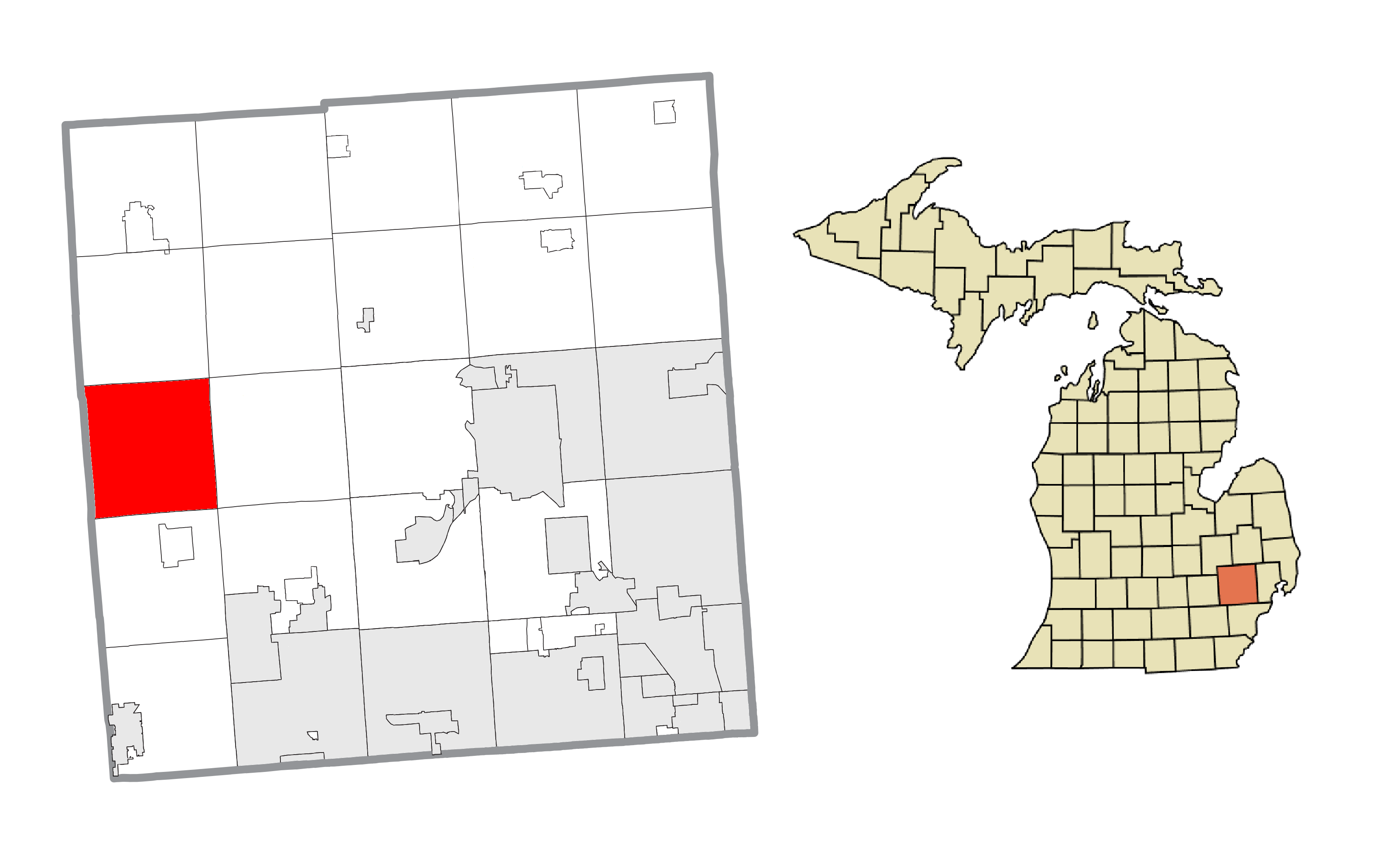
- Location within Oakland County

- Location within the state of Michigan
- Coordinates: 42°39′00″N 83°37′00″W
- Country: United States
- State: Michigan
- County: Oakland
- Established: 1835

Government
  - Supervisor: Rick Hamill
  - Clerk: Tami Flowers
  - Treasurer: Jennifer Frederick

Area
  - Charter township: 36.18 sq mi (93.7 km^{2})
  - Land: 34.11 sq mi (88.3 km^{2})
  - Water: 2.07 sq mi (5.4 km^{2})
- Elevation: 1,027 ft (313 m)

Population (2020)
  - Charter township: 19,172
  - Density: 562.1/sq mi (217.0/km^{2})
  - Metro: 4,296,250 (Metro Detroit)
- Time zone: UTC-5 (Eastern (EST))
  - Summer (DST): UTC-4 (EDT)
- ZIP code(s): 48356, 48357 (Highland); 48380 (Milford); 48442 (Holly)
- Area code: 248
- FIPS code: 26-38080
- GNIS feature ID: 1626469
- Website: Official website

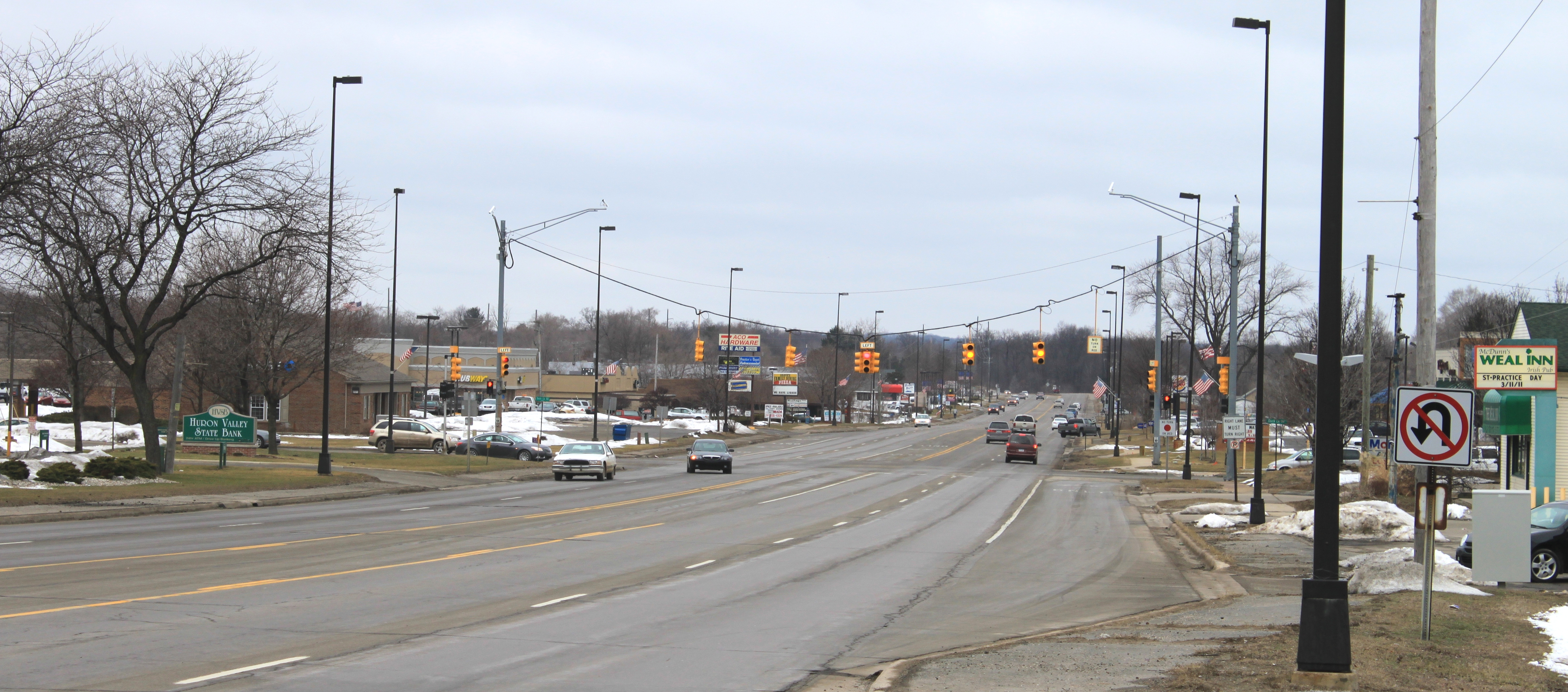
Highland Road (M-59) east of Duck Lake Road, facing west

Highland Township, officially the Charter Township of Highland, is a charter township of west Oakland County, Michigan. The population was 19,172 at the time of the 2020 census.

Highland Township is located about 18 miles (29.0 km) west of the city of Pontiac and about 45 miles (72.4 km) northwest of the city of Detroit.

Highland Township was founded by pioneer families in 1835. A major factor in the development of Highland was the railroad, which allowed lumber to be transported cheaply, and allowed products from the township's early factories to be exported easily. In 2003, in an effort to retain its rural character, as well as preserve its extensive equestrian heritage, Highland declared itself an "equestrian community" and began active support and encouragement of the equestrian presence and related development in the township. In 2006, thanks in large part to the efforts of the Highland Equestrian Conservancy, Highland Township received official recognition by the state government as Michigan's first designated equestrian community.

== Communities ==
While there are no incorporated villages in the township, there are six unincorporated communities:

- Clyde is located at Milford and Clyde Roads (42°40′51″N 83°37′05″W Elevation: 1033 ft./315 m.). Clyde had a Post Office from May 2, 1872, to February 22, 1968. The community also had a rail station. Clyde was platted in 1875.
- East Highland is located at Duck Lake and Highland Roads(42°39′18″N 83°34′18″W Elevation: 1050 ft./320 m.).
- Hickory Ridge is located at Hickory Ridge and Clyde Roads (42°40′47″N 83°39′54″W Elevation: 1112 ft./339 m.).
- Highland is located along Livingston Road between Highland and Eleanor Roads (Western point: 42°38′15″N 83°37′48″W Eastern point: 42°38′17″N 83°37′02″W Elevation: 1014 ft./309 m.).
- Seven Harbors is located on Duck Lake Road between White Lake and Wardlow Roads and Duck Lake and White Lake (42°40′19″N 83°34′20″W Elevation: 1030/314 m.).
- West Highland is located at Hickory Ridge and Highland Roads (42°38′10″N 83°39′44″W Elevation: 1014 ft./309 m.).

== Geography ==
According to the United States Census Bureau, the township has a total area of 36.18 square miles (93.71 km^{2}), of which 34.11 square miles (88.34 km^{2}) is land and 2.07 square miles (5.36 km^{2}) (5.73%) is water.

== Demographics ==
As of the census of 2000, there were 19,169 people, 6,786 households, and 5,374 families residing in the township. The population density was 570.2 per square mile (220.1/km2). There were 7,179 housing units at an average density of 213.5 per square mile (82.4/km2). The racial makeup of the township was 97.42% White, 0.30% African American, 0.46% Native American, 0.37% Asian, 0.02% Pacific Islander, 0.25% from other races, and 1.17% from two or more races. Hispanic or Latino of any race were 1.27% of the population.

There were 6,786 households, out of which 41.6% had children under the age of 18 living with them, 65.8% were married couples living together, 8.9% had a female householder with no husband present, and 20.8% were non-families. 16.8% of all households were made up of individuals, and 5.7% had someone living alone who was 65 years of age or older. The average household size was 2.82 and the average family size was 3.17.

The age distribution was as follows:29.0% of the population was under the age of 18, 7.4% from 18 to 24, 31.6% from 25 to 44, 24.7% from 45 to 64, and 7.3% who were 65 years of age or older. The median age was 36 years. For every 100 females, there were 101.1 males. For every 100 females age 18 and over, there were 99.3 males.

The median income for a household in the township was $62,805, and the median income for a family was $70,286. Males had a median income of $50,944 versus $29,867 for females. The per capita income for the township was $25,484. About 3.8% of families and 5.8% of the population were below the poverty line, including 7.7% of those under age 18 and 6.5% of those age 65 or over.

== Education ==
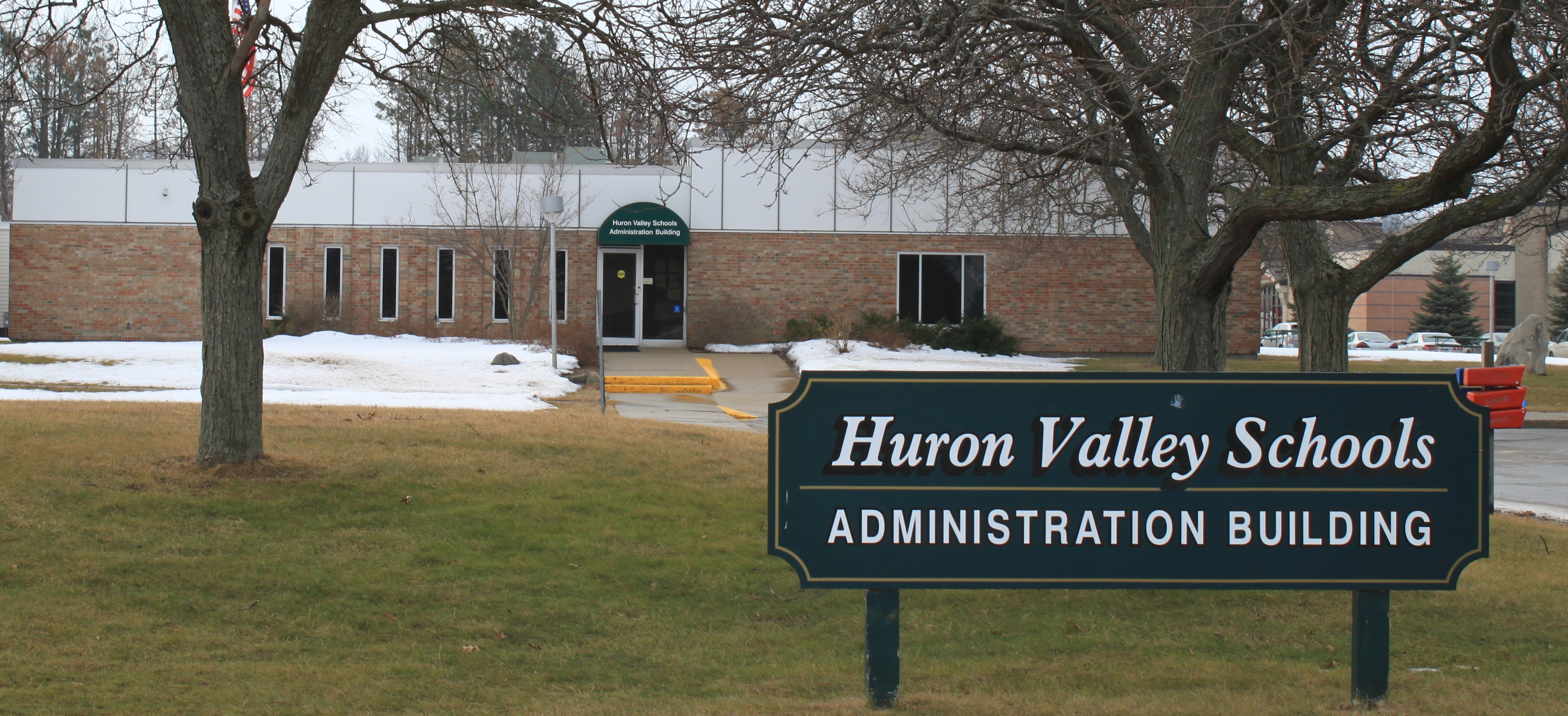
Huron Valley Schools Administration Building

Huron Valley Schools has its headquarters in Highland Township. Milford High School is located in the township.
