= White Lake Township, Michigan =

- Charter township
- Charter Township of White Lake
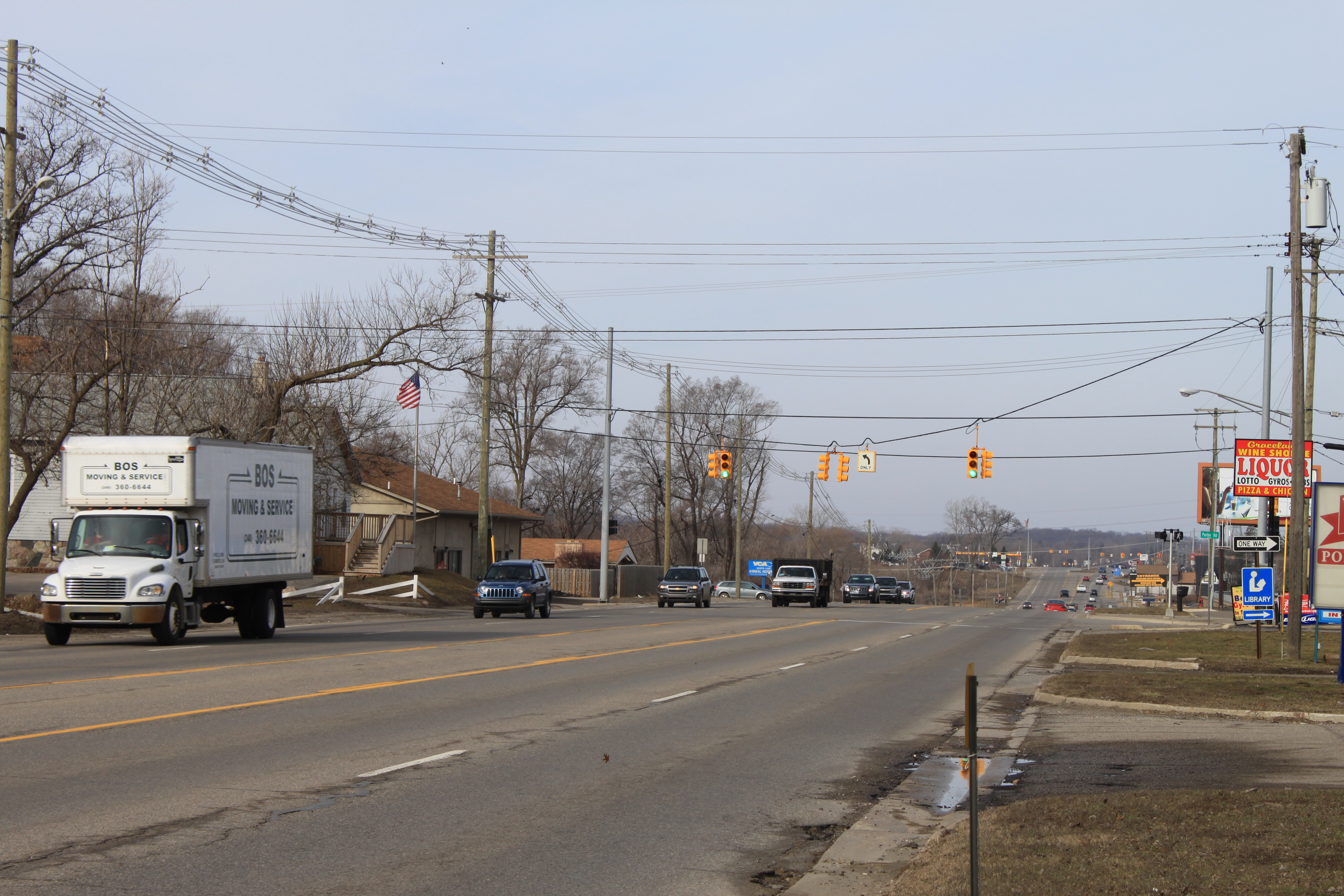
- Highland Road (M-59) west toward Porter Road

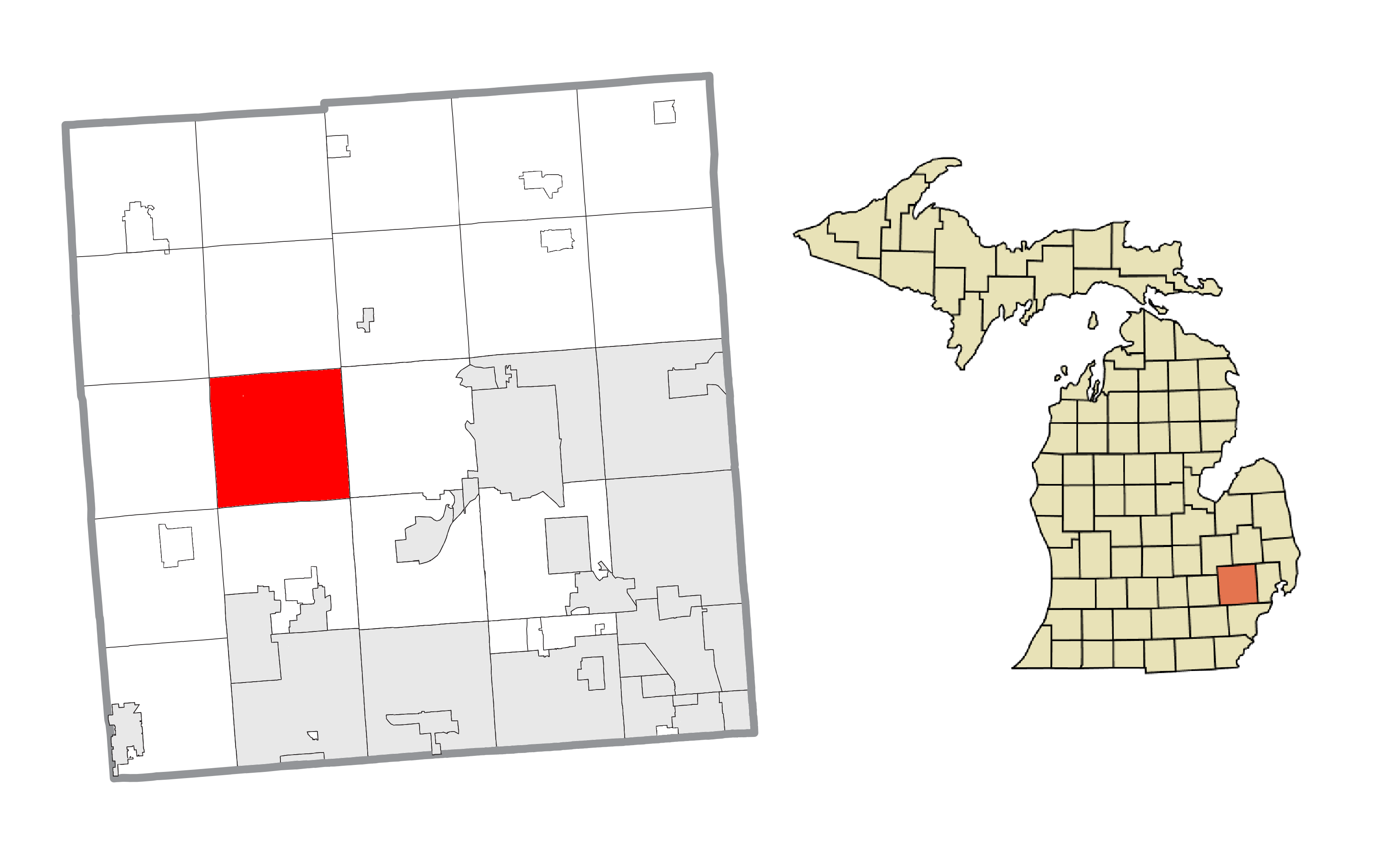
- Location within Oakland County

- Location within the state of Michigan
- Coordinates: 42°38′52″N 83°29′47″W
- Country: United States
- State: Michigan
- County: Oakland

Area
  - Charter township: 37.2 sq mi (96.3 km^{2})
  - Land: 33.7 sq mi (87.2 km^{2})
  - Water: 3.5 sq mi (9.1 km^{2})
- Elevation: 958 ft (292 m)

Population (2020)
  - Charter township: 30,950
  - Density: 919/sq mi (355/km^{2})
  - Metro: 4,296,250 (Metro Detroit)
- Time zone: UTC-5 (Eastern (EST))
  - Summer (DST): UTC-4 (EDT)
- ZIP code(s): 48327, 48383, 48386
- Area code: 248
- FIPS code: 26-86860
- GNIS feature ID: 1627264

White Lake Charter Township is a charter township of Oakland County in the U.S. state of Michigan. Together with its two unincorporated communities, the township makes up part of the Detroit metropolitan area outskirts. As of the 2020 census, the township population was 30,950.

The Huron River rises in White Lake Township.

== Communities ==
The Township has three unincorporated communities:

- East White Lake was the name of a post office in the township from 1846 until 1850.
- Oxbow is located at Union Lake and Elizabeth Lake Roads (42°38′26″N 83°28′23″W; Elevation: 945 ft./288 m.). On June 11, 1873, White Lake Centre Post Office opened here. The Office changed its name to Ox Bow on March 10, 1875, and again in 1894 to Oxbow. On June 29, 1901, the Post Office was closed.
- White Lake is located at Ormond and White Lake Roads (42°41′30″N 83°33′15″W; Elevation: 1037 ft./316 m.) and is mostly known for its National Weather Service office, located within the township. White Lake had a post office initially named as Plainville when it opened on July 11, 1838. The Post Office was renamed White Lake on May 29, 1841, and closed on Jan. 31, 1910. It operated from 1962 to 1976 as a branch/station of Union Lake.

== Geography ==
According to the United States Census Bureau, the township has a total area of 37.2 square miles (96 km^{2}), of which 33.7 square miles (87 km^{2}) is land and 3.5 square miles (9.1 km^{2}), or 9.44%, is water.

Several of the community's large parcels have been preserved as state recreation areas and county parks. Rural residential development and lake living is typical, as the township has 21 lakes within its borders.

Intersected by M-59, a majority of the township's commercial development has occurred along this major east–west corridor.

The southernmost area of the township is located 19 miles (30 km) northwest of the Detroit city limits, and 10 miles (20 km) from downtown Pontiac.

== Demographics ==
As of the census of 2000, there were 28,219 people, 10,092 households, and 7,821 families residing in the township. The population density was 838.3 inhabitants per square mile (323.7/km^{2}). There were 10,616 housing units at an average density of 315.4 per square mile (121.8/km^{2}). The racial makeup of the township was 96.56% White, 0.78% African American, 0.49% Native American, 0.59% Asian, 0.02% Pacific Islander, 0.29% from other races, and 1.28% from two or more races. Hispanic or Latino of any race were 1.81% of the population.

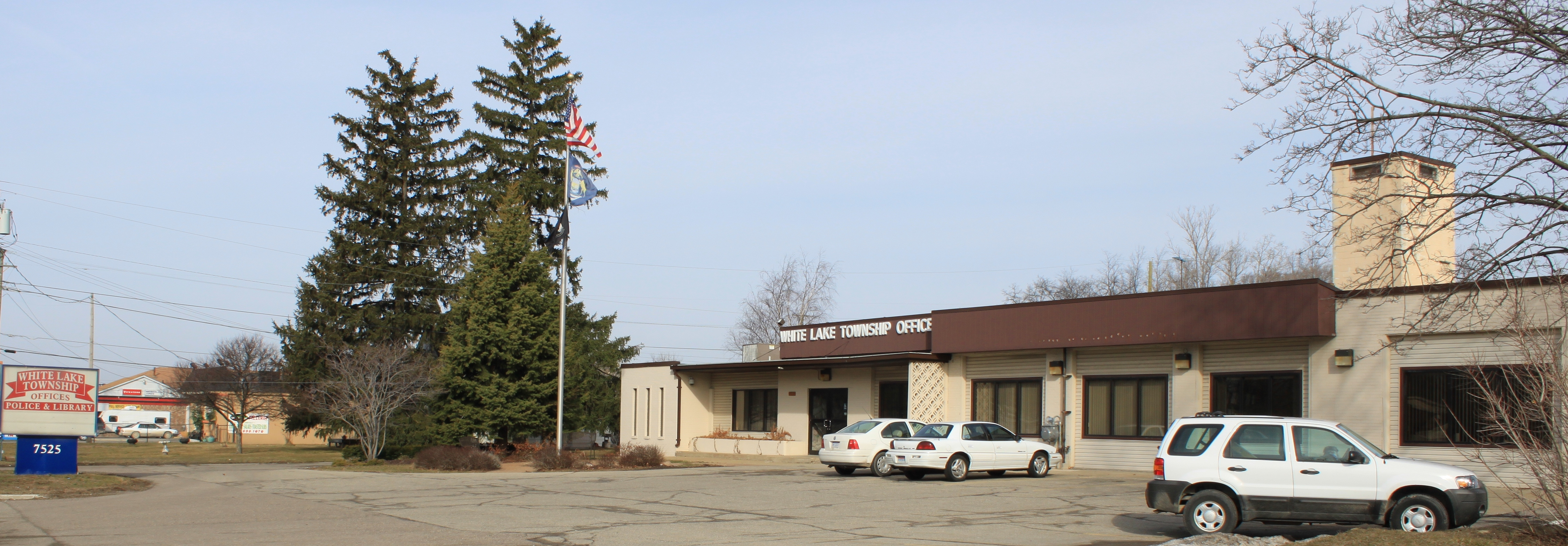
Township Offices, Highland Road

There were 10,092 households, out of which 39.0% had children under the age of 18 living with them, 65.0% were married couples living together, 8.7% had a female householder with no husband present, and 22.5% were non-families. 17.6% of all households were made up of individuals, and 4.5% had someone living alone who was 65 years of age or older. The average household size was 2.77 and the average family size was 3.15.

In the township the population was spread out, with 27.7% under the age of 18, 6.8% from 18 to 24, 32.8% from 25 to 44, 24.9% from 45 to 64, and 7.8% who were 65 years of age or older. The median age was 36 years. For every 100 females, there were 100.1 males. For every 100 females age 18 and over, there were 99.1 males.

The median income for a household in the township was $65,894, and the median income for a family was $75,842. Males had a median income of $52,276 versus $31,742 for females. The per capita income for the township was $27,916. About 1.9% of families and 3.1% of the population were below the poverty line, including 3.0% of those under age 18 and 3.2% of those age 65 and over.

== Education ==
The Township is served by five public school districts: Clarkston, Holly, Huron Valley, Walled Lake and Waterford.

St. Patrick Catholic School is in White Lake.

== Recreation ==
The nearby Highland Recreation Area offers many recreational activities with trails to accommodate equestrian riders, mountain bikers, hikers and skiers. Three different day-use areas provide ample space for picnics, swimming, horseshoes or volleyball. Access sites are located on four lakes within the park for fishing and recreational boating. Located within it now is Haven Hill, the Edsel Ford estate, designed by renowned landscape architect Jens Jensen between 1922 and 1935. Haven Hill is designated as a Michigan State Historical Landmark and a State Natural Preserve. Jensen's landscape elements, with the diversity of tree, plant and animal life, combine aesthetics, history and nature.

The town is home to Alpine Valley ski resort which opened in 1961 and is a major attraction to the area during the winter months. This resort, the largest in southeast Michigan, is host to multiple lifts with a range of runs available. There are also terrain parks.

There are several other public and private parks and lakes that provide recreation to residents and non-residents. Pontiac Lake State recreation area offers public boat access, is renowned for its challenging mountain bike track, and is mostly within the borders of White Lake Township. Pontiac Lake is home to the annual "Quake on the Lake" hydroplane races. White Lake (the lake) also has public access. The township is also home to several parks with public golf courses, including White Lake Oaks and Indian Springs Metropark.
