= Michigan's 19th Senate district =

American legislative district

Michigan's 19th State Senate district
Senator
Sean McCann; D–Kalamazoo
- Demographics: 74.9% White; 10.5% Black; 5.9% Hispanic; 2.8% Asian; 0.1% Native American; 0.4% Other; 5.4% Multiracial
- Population (2024): 272,203

Michigan's 19th Senate district is one of 38 districts in the Michigan Senate. The 19th district was created by the 1850 Michigan Constitution, as the 1835 constitution only permitted a maximum of eight senate districts. It has been represented by Sean McCann since 2023, succeeding Republican John Bizon.

== Geography ==
District 19 encompasses parts of Kalamazoo and Van Buren counties.

=== 2011 Apportionment Plan ===
District 19, as dictated by the 2011 Apportionment Plan, was based in Battle Creek and covered all of Barry, Calhoun, and Ionia Counties. Other communities in the district included Ionia, Albion, Marshall, Springfield, Level Park-Oak Park, Hastings, Middleville, Belding, Portland, Emmett Township, Bedford Township, and Pennfield Township.

The district was located entirely within Michigan's 3rd congressional district, and overlapped with the 62nd, 63rd, 86th, and 87th districts of the Michigan House of Representatives.

== List of senators ==
Senator	Party	Dates	Residence	Notes
Royal T. Twombly	Democratic	1853–1854	Niles	
Rodney C. Paine	Republican	1855–1856	Niles	
Gilbert Moyers	Republican	1857–1858	Allegan	
Philotus Haydon	Republican	1859–1860	Decatur	
Henry C. Briggs	Republican	1861–1862	Allegan	
Samuel H. Blackman	Republican	1863–1864	Paw Paw	
Wilson C. Edsell	Republican	1865–1866	Otsego	
Frederick W. Curtenius	Republican	1867–1868	Kalamazoo	
Delos Phillips	Republican	1869–1870	Kalamazoo	
James N. Neasmith	Republican	1871–1872	Schoolcraft Township	
James L. Curry	Republican	1873–1874	Clio	
George W. Fish	Democratic	1875–1876	Flint	
Francis H. Rankin Sr.	Republican	1877–1878	Flint	
Simeon R. Billings	Republican	1879–1882	Flint	
George E. Taylor	Republican	1883–1884	Flint	
Horace C. Spencer	Republican	1885–1886	Flint	
Albert K. Roof	Republican	1887–1888	Lyons	
William Toan	Republican	1889–1892	Portland	
George A. Steel	Republican	1893–1894	St. Johns	
Chester W. Martin	Republican	1895–1896	Ithaca	
Elisha Mudge	Democratic	1897–1898	Maple Rapids	Elected on a Democratic, Populist and free silver ticket.
Charles W. Giddings	Republican	1899–1900	St. Louis	
Hiram M. High	Republican	1901–1902	Ovid	
Coleman C. Vaughan	Republican	1903–1904	St. Johns	
Townsend A. Ely	Republican	1905–1908	Alma	
Fred B. Kline	Republican	1909–1912	Addison	
Verne C. Amberson	Democratic	1913–1914	Blissfield	
Frank A. Groger	Democratic	1915–1916	Brooklyn	
Ernest J. Bryant	Republican	1917–1922	Sand Creek	
Norman B. Horton	Republican	1923–1932	Lenawee County	
Samuel W. Raymond	Democratic	1933–1934	Adrian	
Denias Dawe	Democratic	1935–1936	Monroe	
Elmer R. Porter	Republican	1937–1964	Blissfield	
Haskell L. Nichols	Republican	1965–1966	Jackson	
James G. Fleming	Republican	1967–1974	Jackson	
Hal Ziegler	Republican	1975–1978	Jackson	
John S. Mowat Jr.	Republican	1979–1982	Adrian	
Nick Smith	Republican	1983–1993	Addison	Resigned after elected to the U. S. House of Representatives.
Philip E. Hoffman	Republican	1993–2002	Horton	
Mark Schauer	Democratic	2003–2008	Battle Creek	Resigned after elected to the U. S. House of Representatives.
Mike Nofs	Republican	2009–2018	Battle Creek	
John Bizon	Republican	2019–2022	Battle Creek	
Sean McCann	Democratic	2023–present	Kalamazoo	
Julie Rogers	Democratic	(Note: Member-elect.)		

== Recent election results ==
=== 2020s ===
2026 Michigan Senate election
Primary election
Party	Candidate	Votes	%
Democratic	Julie M. Rogers	43,446	100
Total votes		43,446	100
Republican	Shaun Young	18,149	100
Total votes		18,149	100
General election
Democratic	Julie M. Rogers	82,979	64.4
Republican	Shaun Young	45,865	35.6
Total votes		128,844	100
Democratic hold			

2022 Michigan Senate election, District 19
Party	Candidate	Votes	%
Democratic	Sean McCann (incumbent)	70,507	59.8
Republican	Tamara Mitchell	47,427	40.2
Total votes		117,934	100
Democratic gain from Republican			

=== 2018 ===
2018 Michigan Senate election, District 19
Primary election
Party	Candidate	Votes	%
Republican	John Bizon	17,163	58.9
Republican	Mike Callton	11,960	41.1
Total votes		29,123	100
General election
Republican	John Bizon	57,242	58.6
Democratic	Jason Noble	37,462	38.3
Libertarian	Joseph Gillotte	2,982	3.1
Total votes		97,686	100
Republican hold			

=== 2014 ===
2014 Michigan Senate election, District 19
Party	Candidate	Votes	%
Republican	Mike Nofs (incumbent)	44,798	61.6
Democratic	Greg Grieves	27,951	38.4
Total votes		72,749	100
Republican hold			

=== Federal and statewide results ===
Year	Office	Results
2020	President	Trump 59.7 – 38.3%
2018	Senate	James 55.8 – 41.6%
2018	Governor	Schuette 52.9 – 43.4%
2016	President	Trump 58.1 – 35.9%
2014	Senate	Land 47.4 – 47.2%
2014	Governor	Snyder 57.4 – 40.2%
2012	President	Romney 52.7 – 46.1%
2012	Senate	Stabenow 50.6 – 45.8%

== Historical district boundaries ==
Map	Description	Apportionment Plan	Notes
	Hillsdale County (part); Adams Township; Allen Township; Amboy Township; Cambria Township; Fayette Township; Hillsdale; Hillsdale Township; Jefferson Township; Litchfield Township; Moscow Township; Pittsford Township; Ransom Township; Scipio Township; Somerset Township; Wheatland Township; Wright Township; Jackson County; Lenawee County (part); Adrian Township; Adrian; Cambridge Township; Dover Township; Franklin Township; Hudson; Hudson Township; Medina Township; Morenci; Rollin Township; Rome Township; Seneca Township; Woodstock Township	1964 Apportionment Plan	
	Hillsdale County (part); Excluding; Allen Township; Litchfield Township; Reading; Reading Township; Jackson County (part); Blackman Township (part); Columbia Township; Concord Township; Grass Lake Township; Hanover Township; Henrietta Township; Jackson; Leoni Township; Liberty Township; Napoleon Township; Norvell Township; Parma Township; Sandstone Township; Spring Arbor Township; Springport Township; Summit Township; Lenawee County (part); Excluding; Clinton Township; Tecumseh Township; Washtenaw County (part); Manchester Township; Sharon Township	1972 Apportionment Plan	
	Branch County; Hillsdale County; Jackson County	1982 Apportionment Plan	
	Branch County; Hillsdale County; Jackson County	1992 Apportionment Plan	
	Calhoun County; Jackson County (part); Blackman Township; Columbia Township; Concord Township; Hanover Township; Henrietta Township; Jackson; Liberty Township; Napoleon Township; Parma Township; Pulaski Township; Rives Township; Sandstone Township; Spring Arbor Township; Springport Township; Tompkins Township; Waterloo Township	2001 Apportionment Plan	
	Barry County; Calhoun County; Ionia County	2011 Apportionment Plan	
