= John Bizon =

American otolaryngologist and politician

Member of the Michigan Senate from the 19th district
- In office January 1, 2019 – December 31, 2022
- Preceded by: Mike Nofs
- Succeeded by: Sean McCann

Member of the Michigan House of Representatives from the 62nd district
- In office January 1, 2014 – December 31, 2018
- Preceded by: Kate Segal
- Succeeded by: Jim Haadsma

Personal details
- Born: September 1, 1951 (age 74) Detroit, Michigan, U.S.
- Party: Republican
- Spouse: Deborah Bizon
- Children: 4
- Education: Michigan State University (BS); Wayne State University (MD)

Military service
- Branch: United States Air Force
- Service: 11 years
- Rank: Lieutenant colonel

John Bizon (born September 1, 1951) was an American politician and physician who served as a member of the Michigan Senate for the 19th district. Elected in November 2018, he assumed office on January 1, 2019, and served until December 31, 2022. He did not rerun after pleading guilty to assault and battery charges for grabbing/verbally harassing a nurse (allegedly two) treating him with COVID-19 in August 2021.

== Early life and education ==
John Bizon was born in Detroit on September 1, 1951, and raised in Allen Park, Michigan. He attended St. Frances Cabrini Elementary and was an altar boy. He earned a Bachelor of Science from Michigan State University and a medical degree from Wayne State University School of Medicine.

== Career ==
=== Military service ===
After graduating from the Air Force's Flight Surgeon's school, Air Force pilots became Bizon's primary patients. His military career included stations in at Lackland Air Force Base, the Upper Peninsula at K-I Sawyer Air Force Base, and the Clark Air Base in the Philippines, where Bizon took care of combat pilots, servicemen and women and civilians during the Vietnam War. After leaving Southeast Asia, Bizon became a lieutenant colonel and ended his Air Force career serving in Michigan at K. I. Sawyer.

=== Medicine ===
After serving 11 years in the Air Force, Bizon was asked by fellow otolaryngologist Joe Schwarz to take up his practice in Battle Creek, Michigan. Schwarz had just been elected to the Michigan Senate himself and went on to become the United States House of Representatives for Michigan's 7th congressional district.

=== Politics ===
Bizon was first elected to represent Michigan's 62nd District in the Michigan House of Representatives in 2014, defeating Andy Helmboldt, following the departure of Kate Segal who had reached her term limit. In November 2016 Bizon was reelected to his second term, defeating then commissioner Jim Haadsma and the Libertarian candidate.

In the 2018 election cycle he ran for Michigan's 19th Senate District, first beating former Representative Mike Callton in a high caliber and expensive primary before being elected in the November general election after defeating the Democratic Party candidate.

Prior to seeking public office Dr. Bizon was the President of the Michigan State Medical Society. He has also been a longtime member of the Calhoun County Republican Party and the Calhoun County TEA Party Patriots.

=== Electoral history ===
2018 Primary Election — Michigan's 19th State Senate District
Party	Candidate	Votes	%	±%
Republican	John Bizon	17,163	58.93	
Republican	Mike Callton	11,960	41.06	

2016 General Election — Michigan's 62nd State House of Representatives District
Party	Candidate	Votes	%	±%
Republican	John Bizon	17,699	48.03	
Democratic	Jim Haadsma	17,490	47.46	
Libertarian	Michelle Gregoire	1,660	4.50	

2014 General Election — Michigan's 62nd State House of Representatives District
Party	Candidate	Votes	%	±%
Republican	John Bizon	11,875	51.16	
Democratic	Andy Helmboldt	11,336	48.84	

2014 Primary Election — Michigan's 62nd State House of Representatives District
Party	Candidate	Votes	%	±%
Republican	John Bizon	2,900	55.47	
Republican	Art Kale	2,328	44.53	
