= Mark Schauer =

American politician (born 1961)

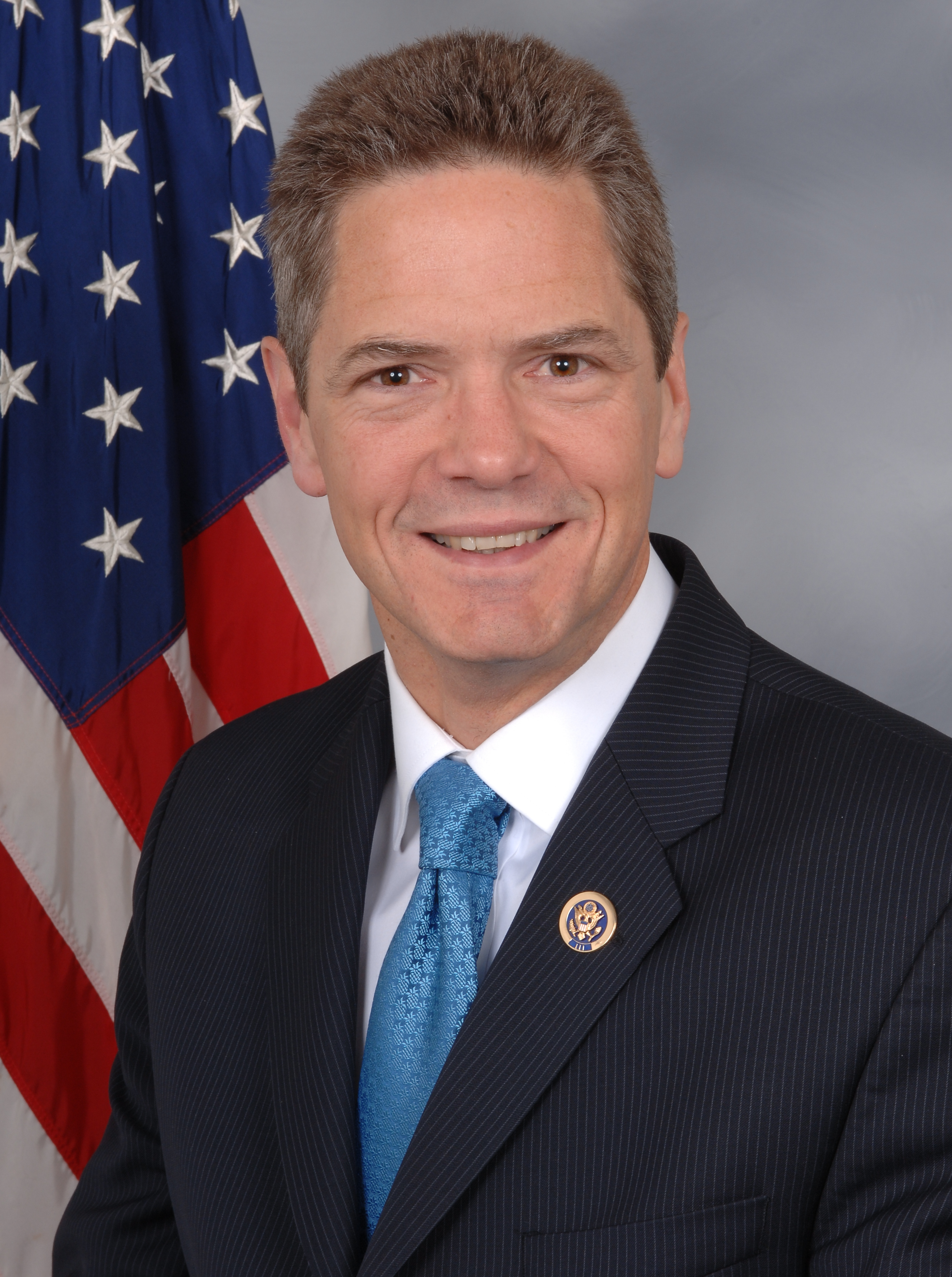

Member of the U.S. House of Representatives from Michigan's 7th district
- In office January 3, 2009 – January 3, 2011
- Preceded by: Tim Walberg
- Succeeded by: Tim Walberg

Minority Leader of the Michigan Senate
- In office January 8, 2007 – January 2, 2009
- Deputy: Tupac Hunter
- Preceded by: Robert Emerson
- Succeeded by: Mike Prusi

Member of the Michigan Senate from the 19th district
- In office January 1, 2003 – January 2, 2009
- Preceded by: Phil Hoffman
- Succeeded by: Mike Nofs

Member of the Michigan House of Representatives from the 62nd district
- In office January 1, 1997 – December 31, 2002
- Preceded by: Eric Bush
- Succeeded by: Mike Nofs

Personal details
- Born: Mark Hamilton Schauer; October 2, 1961 (age 64) Howell, Michigan, U.S.
- Party: Democratic
- Spouse: Christine Schauer
- Education: Albion College (BA); Western Michigan University (MPA); Michigan State University (MA)

Mark Hamilton Schauer (born October 2, 1961) is an American politician who served as a U.S. representative for Michigan's 7th congressional district from 2009 to 2011.

Schauer was previously a member of the Michigan House of Representatives from 1997 to 2002 and a member of the Michigan Senate from 2003 to 2009, where he served as the Minority Leader from 2007 to 2009. In each legislative body, he represented Battle Creek and its surrounding region. In 2008, he was elected to the House of Representatives, defeating Republican incumbent Tim Walberg. A moderate Democrat, Schauer was defeated in a rematch with Walberg in 2010 by 50.2% to 45.4%.

Schauer was the Democratic nominee for governor of Michigan in the 2014 election. He was defeated by incumbent Republican Governor Rick Snyder by 51% to 47%. After the election, Schauer became chairman of PAC Advantage 2020, which aims to help Democrats retake state legislative chambers.

== Early life and education ==
Schauer was born and raised in Howell, Michigan. His mother, Myra (Trafton), was a registered nurse, and his father, Robert Schauer, was a high school science teacher. He was valedictorian of his class at Howell High School. He later graduated summa cum laude from Albion College in 1984, where he was a member of Tau Kappa Epsilon, Phi Beta Kappa, and the Gerald R Ford Institute for Public Policy.

Schauer worked as an urban planner for the Calhoun County Planning Department, 1984–1987, while he completed a master's degree in public administration from Western Michigan University in Kalamazoo. He earned a master's degree in political science from Michigan State University in 1997.

== Career ==
Schauer began his career in program development for the Community Action Agency in Battle Creek. Shortly afterwards, the director left for another position and Schauer was selected to run the CAA, which then consisted of 200 employees, had a 21-member board of directors and offered a broad range of programs for the poor, including home weatherization, a foster grandparent program, food assistance and the local Head Start Program for children.

Schauer was also a founding board member of Battle Creek Habitat for Humanity in 1988 and was honored for fifteen years of service by being named the "2003 Public Official of the Year" by Habitat for Humanity of Michigan. Schauer has also been actively involved in the supporting the Food Bank of South Central Michigan and the Urban League of Battle Creek.

He also serves on the board of directors of the Kids 'N' Stuff Children's Museum in Albion. He was a coordinator of the Calhoun County Human Services Coordinating Council, 1992–1997.

In 1993, Schauer ran for a seat on the Battle Creek City Commission and lost by 200 votes. However, he was later appointed to fill an unexpired term and was then elected to a full term in 1995.

=== Michigan House of Representatives (1997–2003) ===
==== Elections ====
In 1996, Schauer ran for the 62nd district of the Michigan House of Representatives. He won re-election in 1998 and in 2000, with 67% of the vote.

==== Tenure ====
In 1999, he strongly opposed Republican Governor John Engler's plan to appoint a monitor for Detroit Public Schools. He called it "very dangerous" and said it was a "receivership."

He served as the Assistant Democratic Leader from 1999 to 2000.

==== Committee assignments ====
- House Education Subcommittee on Violence in the Schools (Chair)

=== Michigan Senate ===
==== Elections ====
In 2002, Schauer ran for the 19th district of the Michigan Senate. He defeated Republican State Representative Mickey Mortimer 55%-45%. In 2006, he won re-election to a second term, defeating Republican Elizabeth Fulton 61%-39%.

==== Tenure ====
He served as the Senate Minority Whip from 2003 to 2006. He became the Senate Minority Leader after the 2006 elections.

In 2004, he supported the MCCA reform.

In June 2007, Schauer, along with state senators Liz Brater and Gilda Jacobs, and state representative Robert Jones, endorsed Senator Hillary Clinton for U.S. president.

==== Committee assignments ====
- Judiciary

== U.S. House of Representatives ==
=== Elections ===
2008

In August 2007, Schauer formed a finance committee to challenge freshman Republican U.S. Representative Tim Walberg, who was identified as a top target by the DCCC. Schauer was considered a top contender for the Democratic nomination and his announcement resulted in David Nacht, who had raised $160K in the first quarter, to drop out of the race. In September 2007, former State Senator Jim Berryman also dropped out of the Democratic race. Schauer won the Democratic primary by a landslide, defeating Sharon Marie Renier 71%-29%.

In the general election, Schauer defeated Walberg 49%-46%. He won four of the district's seven counties: Calhoun (56%), Washtenaw (51%), Eaton (50%), and Jackson (48%). He is the second Democrat to represent this district since World War I; the district had been numbered as the 2nd District prior to the 1990s round of redistricting.

2010

Walberg filed for a rematch in 2010. Schauer was endorsed by Michigan's largest newspaper, the Detroit Free Press. Schauer's re-election bid was considered to be a toss-up by aggregate polling. Likewise, nonpartisan polling showed the race as a dead heat. In the final days before the election, former President Bill Clinton headlined a rally for Schauer in his home town.

On November 2, 2010, Walberg defeated Schauer 50%-45%. The incumbent won just two of the district's seven counties: Eaton (48%) and his home of Calhoun (50%).

=== Tenure ===
In the 111th Congress, Schauer voted with his party on most major legislation, including votes in support of the Lily Ledbetter Fair Pay Act; reauthorization of the State Children's Health Insurance Program; and in support of a repeal of the Don't Ask, Don't Tell policy. His predecessor, Tim Walberg, had opposed legislation similar to each of these bills in the 110th Congress. Schauer supported the American Recovery and Reinvestment Act, earning him praise from the U.S. Chamber of Commerce, and pledged "vigorous oversight" of how funds were used. In addition, Schauer supported the Dodd-Frank Wall Street Reform and Consumer Protection Act, stating that the legislation would "protect consumers, crack down on the risky practices that put our entire economy at risk, and help lay the groundwork to get our economy back on track" and that his vote was "about doing what's fair." Schauer also supported the Patient Protection and Affordable Care Act, a vote that would receive considerable attention in his 2010 re-election loss.

Based on his bill sponsorship behavior relative to other members of Congress, the web site GovTrack rated Schauer as a "moderate Democratic follower," indicating that Schauer fell near the center of his own party and generally supported the legislative efforts of fellow members.

Schauer voted against the Federal Reserve Transparency Act to audit the Federal Reserve System.

=== Committee assignments ===
- Committee on Agriculture
  - Subcommittee on Conservation, Credit, Energy, and Research
- Committee on Transportation and Infrastructure
  - Subcommittee on Aviation
  - Subcommittee on Highways and Transit (Vice Chair)
  - Subcommittee on Railroads, Pipelines, and Hazardous Materials

== Post-congressional career ==
=== BlueGreen Alliance ===
After leaving Congress, Schauer began working with BlueGreen Alliance, described in an interview as "a partnership of 10 unions and four environmental groups that is dedicated to expanding the number and quality of jobs in the green economy." In the same interview, Schauer noted that he had also been working with the Construction Laborers’ union on Michigan wind farm projects. Schauer stated that "[his] work is focused on jobs, jobs, jobs—that support families and sustain our communities."

In July 2011, Schauer declined to seek a third rematch with Walberg in the 2012 elections. He also ruled out running against Republican Justin Amash in the 3rd congressional district after redistricting moved his house into that district.

=== 2012 labor protests ===
On December 11, 2012, Schauer was one of an estimated 12,500 demonstrators at the Michigan State Capitol protesting the proposed right-to-work legislation. Labor activists and Democrats in the state legislature criticized the legislation as being "about union-busting and retribution for Proposal 2, a failed Nov. 6 labor-backed ballot initiative that would have barred a right-to-work law and enshrined collective bargaining in the state constitution," and suggested that it had been "fast-tracked" without proper discussion or debate.

During the protests, Schauer was among the demonstrators pepper sprayed by police. In a video interview conducted shortly after the incident, he characterized the protests as "a peaceful demonstration where people [were] exercising their First Amendment rights" in which demonstrators were not "touching the building or endangering the building in any way," and stated that the use of pepper spray was "not necessary." When asked whether the incident would prompt him to run for elected office again, Schauer deflected the question, saying only, "I'm angry. What the legislature is doing is wrong, it's cowardly."

=== 2014 gubernatorial election ===
Following the 2012 Right-to-work protests, Democratic polling firm Public Policy Polling conducted a survey testing incumbent Republican Governor Rick Snyder against various Michigan Democrats. Their survey found that although Schauer was unknown by 72 percent of Michigan voters, he would lead Snyder in a hypothetical election, 44 percent to 39 percent. On February 8, 2013, Schauer was interviewed on WKAR's Off the Record, where he stated that he was considering running for governor but that he wasn't "there yet." He admitted some reluctance to commit to a campaign, noting that his "two favorite words in the English language for me are 'Grandpa Schauer.'"

Senate Minority Leader Gretchen Whitmer, who had removed herself from consideration in January, stated in April 2013 that she expected Schauer to be nominated unopposed. In May 2013, Politico reported that the Democratic Governors Association had identified Schauer as a "formidable opponent" to Snyder, and a number of potential rivals for the Democratic nomination gave their support to a potential Schauer candidacy. Michigan Board of Education president John Austin endorsed Schauer, saying "I look forward to helping Mark any way I can, and working with Mark to promote what's best for Michigan." Former U.S. Representative Bart Stupak, who had previously been identified as a leading potential candidate, issued a statement in support of a potential Schauer campaign, saying "[Schauer is] one of the hardest-working people I've ever met, and I know he'd make a terrific governor." Lansing Mayor Virg Bernero, the 2010 Democratic gubernatorial nominee, echoed those sentiments, stating that "Mark Schauer is the right candidate at the right time. He brings the energy and passion that Democrats will rally around, and he brings the know-how and policy expertise that Michigan needs."

On May 14, 2013, Schauer told the Detroit Free Press that he was "strongly leaning toward putting a campaign together." Ten days later, Senators Carl Levin and Debbie Stabenow and U.S. Representatives John Dingell, John Conyers, Sander Levin, Gary Peters, and Dan Kildee issued a joint endorsement of Schauer's potential candidacy. On May 28, Schauer made it official that he is running for Michigan governor.

Schauer lost to incumbent Governor Rick Snyder on November 4, 2014.

=== Advantage 2020 ===
After the election, Schauer became Chairman of the super PAC Advantage 2020, which aims to help Democrats retake state legislative chambers ahead of the 2020 census and subsequent redistricting, which will redraw congressional district boundaries.

== Political positions ==
=== Education ===
Upon receiving the endorsement of the Michigan Education Association, Schauer stated his intention to be "the education governor" if elected. Appearing in an ad produced by the Democratic Governors Association in January 2014, Schauer highlighted his father's career as a high school science teacher and attacked incumbent Governor Rick Snyder for signing a budget that cut education spending by $1 billion—a figure disputed by the Snyder campaign.

On April 16, 2014, Schauer's campaign released a document outlining his priorities for public education, including plans to universal publicly funded pre-school; establishing state standards for maximum class sizes; and eliminating the controversial Education Achievement Authority instituted under Snyder's administration. A Snyder campaign spokesperson criticized the plan for lacking specific details about funding and implementation; Schauer defended his plan and criticized Snyder for "[running] in 2010 without telling anybody what he would do."

Following a series of articles published by the Detroit Free Press detailing a year-long investigation of charter schools in Michigan, Schauer called for "more accountability and transparency," and criticized charter schools that operate as for-profit organizations.

=== Minimum wage ===
In November 2013, Schauer proposed increasing Michigan's minimum wage from $7.40 per hour to $9.25 per hour over three years, and then indexing future minimum wage increases to inflation. Incumbent Governor Rick Snyder indicated that such a change would not be a part of his agenda, with a spokesperson explaining that increasing the minimum wage "hasn't been a burning issue because Michigan is already above the federal minimum."

Public opinion polling indicated broad support for increasing Michigan's minimum wage, with 65 percent of voters supporting a proposed ballot initiative that would raise the minimum wage to $10.10 per hour over three years. With the ballot initiative expected to boost Democratic turnout in the November 2014 elections, the majority-Republican Michigan Legislature moved to support a minimum wage increase to just $8.15 per hour, which would preempt the $10.10 proposal and keep the initiative off the ballot in November.

However, disagreement within the Michigan Senate Republican caucus meant the $8.15 proposal could not pass with Republican votes alone. On May 15, 2014, the Michigan Senate passed compromise legislation raising the minimum wage to $9.20 per hour over three years, supported by the majority of the Senate Democratic caucus and half of the Senate Republicans. Schauer appeared on the floor of the Senate arm-in-arm with Republican Majority Leader Randy Richardville, congratulating Richardville and highlighting the similarities between his original proposal and the legislation that had just been passed. The final version of the legislation (passed on May 27, 2014, and signed by Snyder later that day) increased the minimum wage to $9.25 per hour over three years, then indexing future increases to inflation—nearly identical to Schauer's November 2013 proposal.

=== Taxes ===
In an op-ed in The Holland Sentinel, Schauer criticized incumbent Governor Rick Snyder for what he characterized as "the Snyder Senior Tax." Schauer cited taxes on retirement income instituted in 2012 and potential cuts in pensions as part of the settlement in the Detroit bankruptcy before concluding that "[s]eniors and retirees are paying more in taxes because of Snyder’s tax policies."

Schauer has also objected to what he calls "a massive $1.8 billion tax cut to businesses," referencing the 2011 elimination of the Michigan Business Tax. Schauer has contrasted this tax cut with cuts in education spending and tax increases on pensions, saying that "[w]e've got to get our priorities right and we've got to get our fundamentals right."

=== Same-sex marriage ===
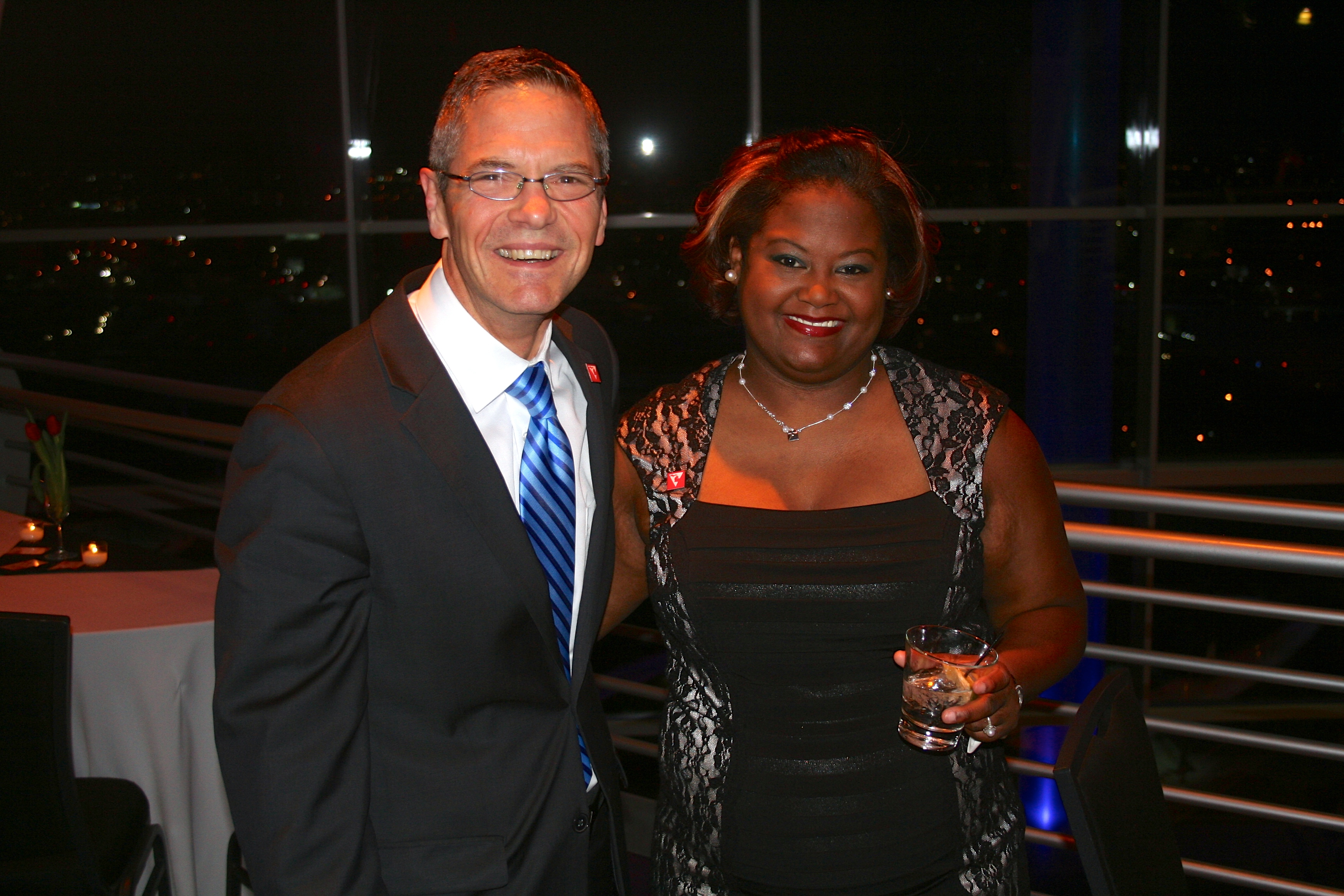
Schauer at the Equality Michigan Annual Dinner, 2014

Following the Supreme Court rulings in United States v. Windsor and Hollingsworth v. Perry, Schauer called upon incumbent Governor Rick Snyder to recognize same-sex marriages performed in other states and indicated that if elected, he would seek to legalize same-sex marriage in Michigan as well. When Michigan's bans on same-sex marriage and adoption by same-sex couples were overturned in DeBoer v. Snyder, Schauer issued a statement supporting the ruling and encouraged Snyder and Michigan Attorney General Bill Schuette to not appeal the decision. Four Michigan counties issued 323 marriage licenses to same-sex couples after the ruling but before an appeals court stayed on the decision, and Schauer has encouraged the state of Michigan to recognize those marriages.

Schauer's running mate for lieutenant governor, Oakland County Clerk Lisa Brown, is one of the county clerks who issued marriage licenses to same-sex couples prior to the appeal.

== Electoral history ==
- 2010 Election for the U.S. Representative – Michigan's 7th District

Name	Percent
Mark Schauer (D) (Inc.)	45.3%
Tim Walberg (R)	50.2%

- 2008 Election for the U.S. Representative – Michigan's 7th District

Name	Percent
Mark Schauer (D)	48.8%
Tim Walberg (R) (Inc.)	46.5%

- 2006 Election for the Michigan State Senate – 19th District

Name	Percent
Mark Schauer (D) (Inc.)	61.2%
Elizabeth Fulton (R)	38.8%

- 2002 Election for the Michigan State Senate – 19th District

Name	Percent
Mark Schauer (D)	55.14%
Mickey Mortimer (R)	44.86%

- 2000 Election for the Michigan State House – 62nd District

Name	Percent
Mark Schauer (D) (Inc.)	67.10%
George Perrett (R)	32.90%

- 1998 Election for the Michigan State House – 62nd District

Name	Percent
Mark Schauer (D)	63.78%
Mark Behnke (R)	36.21%

- 1996 Election for the Michigan State House – 62nd District

Name	Percent
Mark Schauer (D)	55%
Eric Bush (R) (inc.)	45%

== Personal life ==
Schauer lives in Battle Creek with his wife, Christine Schauer. Together, they own My Style... Your Style, a Battle Creek consignment shop. In November 2012, Christine was elected Calhoun County Treasurer. Schauer has three stepchildren and four grandchildren.

U.S. House of Representatives
Preceded by Tim Walberg	Member of the U.S. House of Representatives from Michigan's 7th congressional district 2009–2011	Succeeded by Tim Walberg
Party political offices
Preceded by Virg Bernero	Democratic nominee for Governor of Michigan; 2014	Succeeded by Gretchen Whitmer
U.S. order of precedence (ceremonial)
Preceded by Dick Chrysler as Former U.S. Representative	Order of precedence of the United States as Former U.S. Representative	Succeeded by Hansen Clarke as Former U.S. Representative
