= Aragona (surname) =

Aragona is an Italian surname. Notable people with the surname include:

- Giancarlo Aragona (born 1942), Italian diplomat
- Joseph Aragona (fl. 2022), American politician

== See also ==
- Aragon
