= 2014 Michigan gubernatorial election =

- November 4, 2014
- Turnout: 41.6% ▼1.3
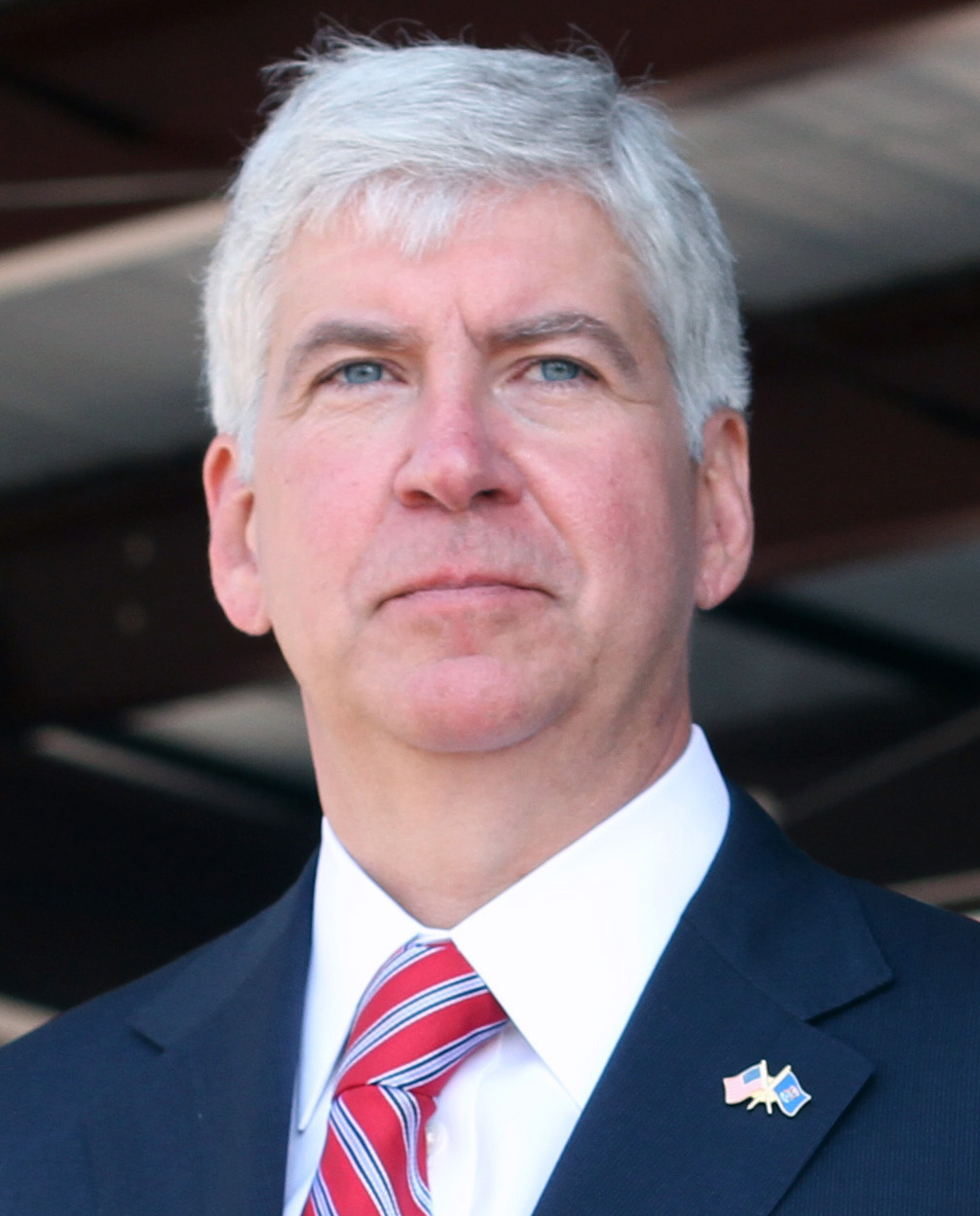

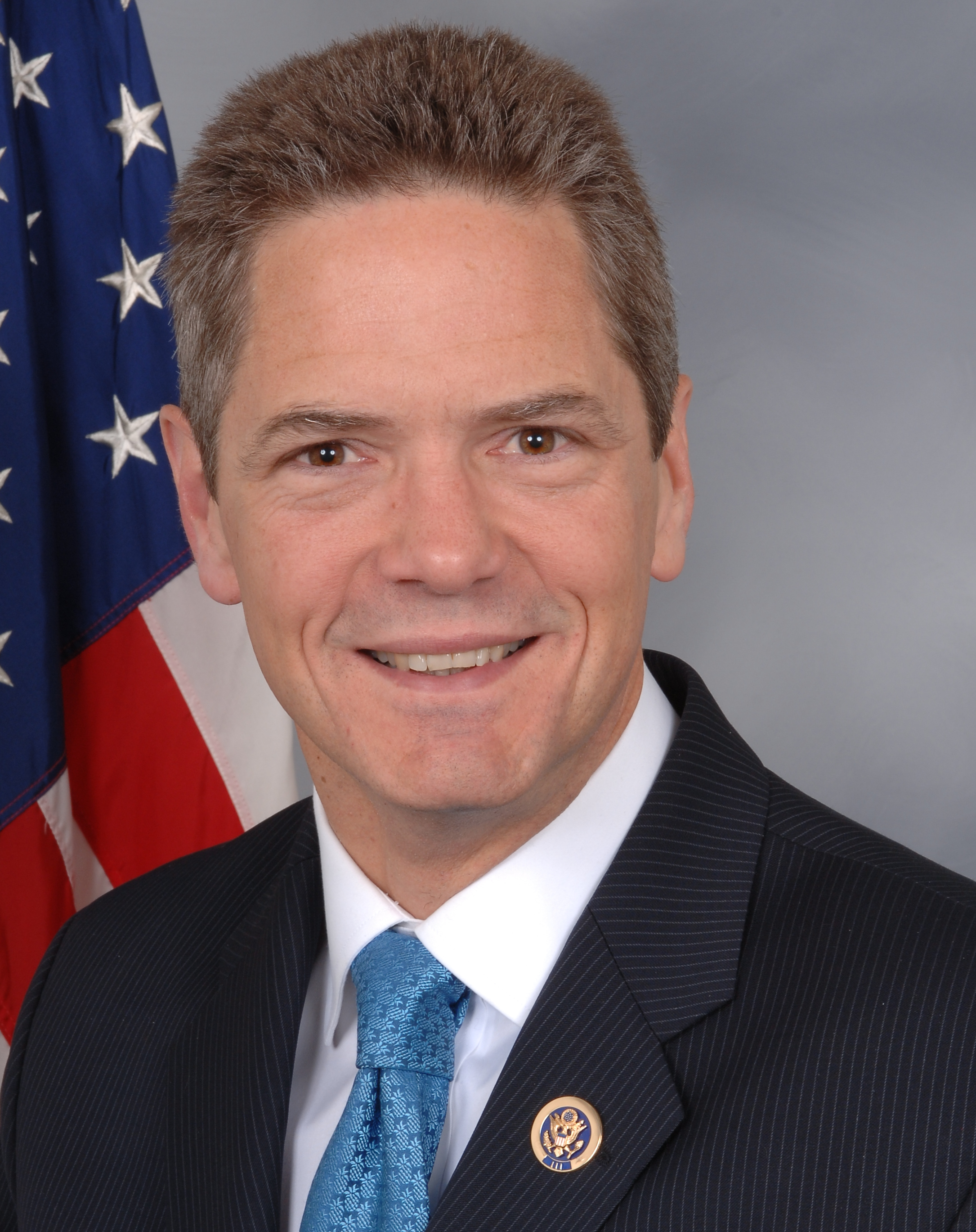
Nominee	Rick Snyder	Mark Schauer
Party	Republican	Democratic
Running mate	Brian Calley	Lisa Brown
Popular vote	1,605,034	1,476,904
Percentage	50.92%	46.86%
- Snyder: 40–50% 50–60% 60–70% 70–80% Schauer: 40–50% 50–60% 60–70% 70–80%
Governor before election
Rick Snyder
Republican
Elected Governor
Rick Snyder
Republican

The 2014 Michigan gubernatorial election took place on November 4, 2014, to elect the governor of Michigan, concurrently with the election of Michigan's Class II U.S. Senate seat, other elections to the United States Senate in other states, elections to the United States House of Representatives, and various state and local elections.

This was one of nine Republican-held governorships up for election in a state that Barack Obama won in the 2012 presidential election. Incumbent Republican Governor Rick Snyder ran for election to a second term in office. Primary elections took place on August 5, 2014, in which Snyder and former U.S. representative Mark Schauer were unopposed in the Republican and Democratic primaries, respectively.

Snyder was considered vulnerable in his bid for a second term, as reflected in his low approval ratings. The consensus among The Cook Political Report, Governing, The Rothenberg Political Report, and Sabato's Crystal Ball was that the contest was a "tossup". Snyder was saddled with a negative approval rating, while his Democratic opponent, former U.S. representative Mark Schauer, suffered from a lack of name recognition. Despite having a more centrist voting record in the House of Representatives, Schauer ran as more of a populist who put education, unions and taxes as his top priorities.

Despite concerns about his approval rating hurting his chances at victory, Snyder was re-elected with 50.9% of the vote. As of 2026, this is the last time a Republican, and a male was elected governor of Michigan, and the last time the Republican candidate won the counties of Kalamazoo, Oakland, Clinton, Macomb, Kent, Leelanau, and Isabella, and the last time the Democratic candidate won the counties of Alger, Baraga, and Manistee. This is also the last time that the winner of the Michigan gubernatorial election won a majority of counties, and the first time since 1990 that Michigan simultaneously voted for gubernatorial and U.S. Senate candidates of different political parties.

== Republican primary ==
Polling indicated significant opposition from Republican primary voters in Michigan towards Snyder's bid for re-election. This came in the midst of discussions by the Tea Party network regarding whether incumbent lieutenant governor Brian Calley should be replaced as Snyder's running mate. Snyder started running campaign ads in September 2013, immediately following the Mackinac Republican Leadership Conference and formally declared that he was seeking re-election in January 2014.

In August 2013, Tea Party leader Wes Nakagiri announced that he would challenge Calley for the Republican nomination for lieutenant governor. At the Mackinac Republican Leadership Conference (September 20–22, 2013), speculation reported by the media also included Todd Courser as a potential challenger to Calley. At the Michigan Republican Party state convention, which took take place on August 23, 2014, incumbent Lieutenant Governor Brian Calley won renomination.

On January 3, 2014, Mark McFarlin (who had originally declared his intention to run as a Democrat the previous November), announced that he would be running for the Republican nomination. He believed that his populist platform was too conservative for the Democratic ticket, and that he could get crossover support in the general election. However, he did not submit his filing petitions in time to qualify for the August primary ballot.

=== Candidates ===
==== Declared ====
- Rick Snyder, incumbent governor of Michigan

==== Failed to qualify ====
- Mark McFarlin, private investigator and Independent write-in candidate for governor in 2002 (had declared as a Democrat, then switched parties)

==== Declined ====
- Mike Bishop, former majority leader of the Michigan Senate (running for Congress)
- Todd Courser, Tea Party activist, candidate for the Michigan Board of Education in 2012 and for chairman of the Michigan Republican Party in 2013

=== Polling ===
Hypothetical polling

Poll source	Date(s) administered	Sample size	Margin of error	Rick Snyder	Dave Agema	Undecided
Harper Polling	September 4, 2013	958	±3.17%	64%	16%	20%
iCaucus Michigan	August 26–30, 2013	744	± 4.08%	32.39%	42.34%	25.27%

Poll source	Date(s) administered	Sample size	Margin of error	Rick Snyder	Mike Bishop	Undecided
iCaucus Michigan	August 26–30, 2013	744	± 4.08%	36.83%	24.19%	38.98%

Poll source	Date(s) administered	Sample size	Margin of error	Rick Snyder	Keith Butler	Undecided
iCaucus Michigan	August 26–30, 2013	744	± 4.08%	38.98%	11.29%	49.73%

Poll source	Date(s) administered	Sample size	Margin of error	Rick Snyder	Betsy DeVos	Undecided
iCaucus Michigan	August 26–30, 2013	744	± 4.08%	40.59%	18.41%	40.99%

Poll source	Date(s) administered	Sample size	Margin of error	Rick Snyder	Gary Glenn	Undecided
iCaucus Michigan	August 26–30, 2013	744	± 4.08%	39.11%	30.78%	30.11%

Poll source	Date(s) administered	Sample size	Margin of error	Rick Snyder	Pete Hoekstra	Undecided
iCaucus Michigan	August 26–30, 2013	744	± 4.08%	47.04%	21.77%	31.18%

Poll source	Date(s) administered	Sample size	Margin of error	Rick Snyder	Bill Schuette	Undecided
iCaucus Michigan	August 26–30, 2013	744	± 4.08%	31.85%	38.44%	29.70%

=== Results ===
Republican primary results
Party	Candidate	Votes	%
Republican	Rick Snyder (incumbent)	617,720	100
Total votes		617,720	100

== Democratic primary ==
Michigan Democratic Party leadership rallied support behind former U.S. representative Mark Schauer, who ran unopposed in the Democratic Party primary. Party Chairman Lon Johnson encouraged all other potential challengers to stay out of the race so as to avoid a costly and potentially bitter primary campaign. Conservative Democrat and "birther" Mark McFarlin had announced on November 29, 2013, that he was running for the Democratic nomination for governor, but he switched parties on January 3, 2014, leaving Schauer as the only candidate for the Democratic nomination.

=== Candidates ===
==== Declared ====
- Mark Schauer, former U.S. representative

- Running mate: Lisa Brown, Oakland County clerk & register of deeds and former state representative

==== Withdrew ====
- Mark McFarlin, private investigator and Independent write-in candidate for governor in 2002 (ran as a Republican)

==== Declined ====
- John C. Austin, president of the Michigan Board of Education
- Vicki Barnett, minority whip of the Michigan House of Representatives
- Jocelyn Benson, dean of Wayne State University Law School and nominee for Michigan secretary of state in 2010
- Virgil Bernero, mayor of Lansing and nominee for governor in 2010
- Mark Bernstein, attorney and regent of the University of Michigan
- Mike Duggan, mayor-elect of Detroit and former Wayne County prosecutor
- Mark Hackel, Macomb County executive
- Dan Kildee, U.S. representative
- Gary Peters, U.S. representative (running for the U.S. Senate)
- Bart Stupak, former U.S. representative
- Gretchen Whitmer, minority leader of the Michigan Senate

=== Polling ===
Hypothetical polling

Poll source	Date(s) administered	Sample size	Margin of error	Mark Schauer	Bob King	Undecided
Mitchell Research	May 28, 2013	361	± 5.16%	31%	38%	31%

=== Results ===
Democratic primary results
Party	Candidate	Votes	%
Democratic	Mark Schauer	513,263	100
Total votes		513,263	100

== Minor parties ==
=== Candidates ===
==== Libertarian Party ====
- Mary Buzuma, nominee for Michigan's 2nd congressional district in 2012
  Running mate: Scott Boman, activist, former chairman of the Libertarian Party of Michigan and perennial candidate

==== Green Party ====
- Paul Homeniuk
  Running mate: Candace Caveny, nominee for the state senate in 2006, 2008 and 2010 and nominee for the State Board of Education in 2012

==== U.S. Taxpayers Party ====
- Mark McFarlin, Independent write-in candidate for governor in 2002
  Running mate: Richard Mendoza

== Independents ==
=== Candidates ===
==== Declared ====
- Robin Sanders, retired from the United States Navy and the Michigan Department of Corrections

== General election ==
=== Debates ===
- Complete video of debate, October 12, 2014 - C-SPAN

=== Predictions ===
Source	Ranking	As of
The Cook Political Report	Tossup	November 3, 2014
Sabato's Crystal Ball	Lean R	November 3, 2014
Rothenberg Political Report	Tilt R	November 3, 2014
Real Clear Politics	Tossup	November 3, 2014

=== Polling ===
Poll source	Date(s) administered	Sample size	Margin of error	Rick Snyder (R)	Mark Schauer (D)	Other	Undecided
Mitchell Research	November 3, 2014	1,310	± 2.7%	48%	47%	3%	2%
Mitchell Research	November 2, 2014	1,224	± 2.8%	47%	47%	4%	3%
Clarity Campaign Labs	November 1–2, 2014	1,003	± 3.08%	45%	45%	—	10%
Public Policy Polling	November 1–2, 2014	914	± 3.2%	46%	45%	4%	5%
Public Policy Polling	November 1–2, 2014	914	± 3.2%	47%	47%	—	5%
EPIC-MRA	October 26–28, 2014	600	± 4%	45%	43%	3%	9%
Mitchell Research	October 27, 2014	1,159	± 2.88%	48%	43%	3%	5%
Glengariff Group	October 22–24, 2014	600	± 4%	45%	40%	5%	10%
CBS News/NYT/YouGov	October 16–23, 2014	2,394	± 3%	44%	45%	1%	11%
Rasmussen Reports	October 20–22, 2014	1,000	± 3%	49%	46%	2%	3%
Public Policy Polling	October 20–21, 2014	723	± ?	48%	48%	—	4%
Clarity Campaign Labs	October 19–20, 2014	1,032	± ?	41%	44%	—	15%
Mitchell Research	October 19, 2014	919	± 3.23%	48%	46%	3%	3%
EPIC-MRA	October 17–19, 2014	600	± 4%	47%	39%	3%	11%
Clarity Campaign Labs	October 12–14, 2014	967	± 3.16%	44%	42%	—	13%
Clarity Campaign Labs	October 11–13, 2014	1,032	± ?	44%	43%	—	13%
Mitchell Research	October 12, 2014	1,340	± 2.68%	47%	44%	3%	6%
Mitchell Research	October 9, 2014	1,306	± 2.71%	47%	46%	4%	3%
Glengariff Group	October 2–4, 2014	600	± 4%	45%	37%	3%	15%
Public Policy Polling	October 2–3, 2014	654	± 3.8%	47%	46%	—	7%
Marketing Resource Group	September 30–October 1, 2014	600	± 4%	46%	41%	4%	10%
CBS News/NYT/YouGov	September 20–October 1, 2014	2,560	± 2%	44%	46%	1%	9%
Lake Research Partners	September 27–30, 2014	600	± 4%	44%	43%	—	12%
Mitchell Research	September 29, 2014	1,178	± 2.86%	46%	42%	5%	8%
EPIC-MRA	September 25–29, 2014	600	± 4%	45%	39%	8%	8%
Target-Insyght	September 22–24, 2014	616	± 4%	44%	45%	—	11%
Public Policy Polling	September 18–19, 2014	852	± 3.4%	46%	44%	—	10%
We Ask America	September 18–19, 2014	1,182	± 3%	43%	43%	4%	10%
Rasmussen Reports	September 17–18, 2014	750	± 4%	47%	41%	3%	9%
Denno Research	September 11–13, 2014	600	± 4%	43%	40%	—	17%
Mitchell Research	September 10, 2014	829	± 3.4%	46%	41%	7%	6%
Suffolk	September 6–10, 2014	500	± 4.4%	43%	45%	4%	8%
Public Policy Polling	September 4–7, 2014	687	± 3.7%	43%	42%	6%	9%
Public Policy Polling	September 4–7, 2014	687	± 3.7%	46%	44%	—	10%
Glengariff Group	September 3–5, 2014	600	± 4%	44%	42%	3%	12%
CBS News/NYT/YouGov	August 18–September 2, 2014	2,897	± 3%	44%	43%	1%	12%
Mitchell Research	August 27, 2014	1,004	± 3.09%	47%	46%	—	7%
EPIC-MRA	August 22–25, 2014	600	± 4%	43%	45%	—	12%
Lake Research Partners	August 6–11, 2014	800	± 3.5%	46%	38%	—	15%
Mitchell Research	August 5, 2014	626	± 5%	47%	42%	—	11%
Rasmussen Reports	July 28–29, 2014	750	± 4%	45%	42%	5%	8%
Marketing Resource Group	July 26–30, 2014	600	± 4%	45%	44%	—	11%
CBS News/NYT/YouGov	July 5–24, 2014	3,812	± 2.8%	46%	43%	1%	9%
Mitchell Research	July 7–17, 2014	600	± 4%	43%	39%	—	17%
EPIC-MRA	July 12–15, 2014	600	± 4%	46%	43%	—	11%
Denno Research	July 9–11, 2014	600	± 4%	43%	35%	—	22%
NBC News/Marist	July 7–10, 2014	870	± 3.3%	46%	44%	1%	9%
Public Policy Polling	June 26–29, 2014	578	± 4.1%	40%	40%	—	20%
Mitchell Research	June 6, 2014	961	± 3.16%	46%	41%	—	13%
Glengariff Group	May 20–22, 2014	600	± 4.3%	45%	35%	—	20%
EPIC-MRA	May 17–20, 2014	600	± 4%	47%	38%	—	15%
Hickman Analytics	April 24–30, 2014	502	± 4.4%	48%	37%	—	15%
Magellan Strategies	April 14–15, 2014	875	± 3.31%	45%	42%	9%	4%
Mitchell Research	April 9, 2014	1,460	± 2.56%	49%	37%	—	15%
Public Policy Polling	April 3–6, 2014	825	± 3.4%	43%	39%	—	18%
Marketing Resource Group	March 24–28, 2014	600	± 4.1%	47%	39%	—	14%
Denno Research	March 9–10, 2014	600	± 4%	42%	39%	—	20%
Benenson Strategy Group	March 4–7, 2014	600	± 4%	45%	42%	—	9%
Public Opinion Strategies	March 2–4, 2014	500	± 4.4%	45%	36%	—	19%
Clarity Campaigns	February 22–23, 2014	859	± 2.55	40%	47%	—	12%
Target Insyght	February 18–20, 2014	600	± ?	47%	38%	—	15%
EPIC-MRA	February 5–11, 2014	600	± 4%	47%	39%	—	14%
Harper Polling	January 7–8, 2014	1,004	± 3.09%	47%	35%	—	18%
Public Policy Polling	December 5–8, 2013	1,034	± 3%	44%	40%	—	16%
Denno Research	November 12–14, 2013	600	± 4%	45%	31%	—	25%
Inside Michigan Politics	October 29, 2013	794	± 4%	36%	34%	—	30%
MRG/Mitchell Research	October 6–10, 2013	600	± 4%	50%	36%	—	14%
EPIC-MRA	September 7–10, 2013	600	± 4%	44%	36%	—	20%
Denno Research	July 23–24, 2013	600	± 4%	43%	37%	—	20%
Public Policy Polling	May 30–June 2, 2013	697	± 3.7%	38%	42%	—	20%
EPIC-MRA	May 11–15, 2013	600	± 4%	39%	39%	—	22%
EPIC-MRA	April 13–16, 2013	600	± 4%	38%	39%	—	23%
Public Policy Polling	March 2–4, 2013	702	± 3.7%	36%	40%	—	24%
Public Policy Polling	December 13–16, 2012	650	± 3.8%	39%	44%	—	18%

Hypothetical polling

Poll source	Date(s) administered	Sample size	Margin of error	Rick Snyder (R)	Virg Bernero (D)	Undecided
Public Policy Polling	March 2–4, 2013	702	± 3.7%	38%	43%	19%
Public Policy Polling	December 13–16, 2012	650	± 3.8%	38%	49%	12%

Poll source	Date(s) administered	Sample size	Margin of error	Rick Snyder (R)	Gary Peters (D)	Undecided
Public Policy Polling	March 2–4, 2013	702	± 3.7%	37%	44%	19%
Public Policy Polling	December 13–16, 2012	650	± 3.8%	39%	47%	14%

Poll source	Date(s) administered	Sample size	Margin of error	Rick Snyder (R)	Bart Stupak (D)	Undecided
EPIC-MRA	April 13–16, 2013	600	± 4%	39%	38%	23%

Poll source	Date(s) administered	Sample size	Margin of error	Rick Snyder (R)	Gretchen Whitmer (D)	Undecided
Public Policy Polling	December 13–16, 2012	650	± 3.8%	38%	46%	16%

=== Results ===
Michigan gubernatorial election, 2014
Party	Candidate	Votes	%	±%
Republican	Rick Snyder (incumbent)	1,607,399	50.92%	−7.19%
Democratic	Mark Schauer	1,479,057	46.86%	+6.96%
Libertarian	Mary Buzuma	35,723	1.13%	+0.44%
U.S. Taxpayers'	Mark McFarlin	19,368	0.61%	−0.04%
Green	Paul Homeniuk	14,934	0.47%	−0.17%
n/a	Write-ins	50	0.00%	N/A
Total votes		3,156,531	100.0%	N/A
Republican hold				

==== By county ====
County	Rick Snyder Republican		Mark Schauer Democratic		Various candidates Other parties		Margin		Total
County	#	%	#	%	#	%	#	%	Total
Alcona	2,529	56.6%	1,806	40.4%	131	2.9%	723	16.2%	4,466
Alger	1,520	46.3%	1,646	50.1%	117	3.5%	-126	-3.8%	3,283
Allegan	23,301	65.7%	11,187	31.6%	965	2.7%	12,114	34.1%	35,453
Alpena	4,810	50.0%	4,546	47.3%	264	2.7%	264	2.7%	9,620
Antrim	5,881	61.8%	3,407	35.8%	231	2.4%	2,474	26.0%	9,519
Arenac	2,708	50.4%	2,459	45.7%	211	3.9%	249	4.7%	5,378
Baraga	1,180	47.4%	1,249	50.2%	58	2.3%	-69	-2.8%	2.487
Barry	12,824	63.9%	6,760	33.7%	480	2.4%	6,064	30.2%	20,064
Bay	17,899	46.9%	19,307	50.5%	996	2.7%	-1,408	-3.6%	38,202
Benzie	3,823	52.9%	3,183	44.0%	221	3.0%	640	8.9%	7,227
Berrien	24,173	55.6%	18,042	41.5%	1,264	2.9%	6,131	14.1%	43,479
Branch	7,050	62.4%	3,907	34.6%	334	2.9%	3,143	27.8%	11,291
Calhoun	20,425	53.8%	16,709	44.0%	832	2.2%	3,716	9.8%	37,966
Cass	7,521	56.0%	5,425	40.4%	476	3.6%	2,096	14.6%	13,422
Charlevoix	6,255	59.3%	3,998	37.9%	296	2.8%	2,257	21.4%	10,549
Cheboygan	5,287	55.2%	4,005	41.8%	287	3.0%	1,282	13.4%	9,579
Chippewa	5,590	50.5%	5,166	46.6%	322	2.8%	424	3.9%	11,078
Clare	4,660	50.3%	4,210	45.5%	391	4.3%	450	4.8%	9,261
Clinton	15,946	54.8%	12,723	43.7%	449	1.5%	3,223	11.1%	29,118
Crawford	2,656	55.8%	1,962	41.2%	140	3.0%	694	14.6%	4,758
Delta	7,072	52.7%	6,054	45.1%	292	2.2%	1,018	7.6%	13,418
Dickinson	5,025	58.6%	3,374	39.4%	174	2.0%	1,651	19.2%	8,573
Eaton	20,026	48.8%	20,263	49.4%	752	1.8%	-237	-0.6%	41,041
Emmet	8,063	61.9%	4,580	35.2%	377	2.9%	3,483	26.7%	13,020
Genesee	48,896	37.2%	79,566	60.5%	3,134	2.4%	-30,670	-23.3%	131,596
Gladwin	4,579	53.2%	3,735	43.4%	292	3.4%	844	9.8%	8,606
Gogebic	2,306	45.7%	2,628	52.1%	114	2.3%	-322	-6.4%	5,048
Grand Traverse	19,461	58.3%	12,992	38.9%	913	2.7%	6,469	19.4%	33,366
Gratiot	5,670	51.8%	4,986	45.6%	283	2.6%	684	6.2%	10,939
Hillsdale	8,309	62.4%	4,598	34.5%	406	2.3%	3,711	25.9%	13,313
Houghton	5,581	53.9%	4,449	42.9%	330	3.2%	1,132	11.0%	10,360
Huron	7,143	60.4%	4,377	37.0%	311	2.6%	2,766	23.4%	11,831
Ingham	35,392	40.7%	50,002	57.5%	1,625	1.9%	-14,610	-16.8%	87,019
Ionia	10,424	57.9%	7,093	39.4%	493	2.7%	3,331	18.5%	18,010
Iosco	5,095	53.9%	4,063	43.0%	299	3.2%	1,032	10.9%	9,457
Iron	2,262	53.6%	1,839	43.5%	122	2.9%	423	10.1%	4,223
Isabella	8,031	48.9%	7,871	47.9%	536	3.2%	160	1.0%	16,438
Jackson	25,672	55.5%	19,563	42.3%	998	2.2%	6,109	13.2%	46,233
Kalamazoo	41,409	51.0%	37,524	46.2%	2,227	2.8%	3,885	4.8%	81,160
Kalkaska	3,330	57.6%	2,202	38.1%	249	4.3%	1,128	19.5%	5,781
Kent	116,967	62.1%	67,289	35.7%	4,116	2.2%	49,678	26.4%	188,372
Keweenaw	639	57.4%	444	39.9%	31	2.7%	195	17.5%	1,114
Lake	1,745	49.6%	1,656	47.0%	119	3.4%	89	2.6%	3,520
Lapeer	17,024	57.5%	11,614	39.2%	991	3.3%	5,410	18.3%	29,629
Leelanau	6,172	56.1%	4,600	41.8%	234	2.1%	1,572	14.3%	11,006
Lenawee	15,576	53.6%	12,664	43.6%	834	2.8%	2,912	10.0%	29,074
Livingston	47,113	67.3%	21,484	30.7%	1,425	2.1%	25,629	36.6%	70,022
Luce	1,046	54.7%	810	42.3%	57	3.0%	236	12.4%	1,913
Mackinac	2,414	53.5%	1,996	44.3%	99	2.1%	418	9.2%	4,509
Macomb	142,836	53.9%	116,651	44.0%	5,616	2.1%	26,185	9.9%	265,103
Manistee	4,362	47.1%	4,652	50.3%	242	2.6%	-290	-3.2%	9,256
Marquette	9,264	41.6%	12,458	56.0%	532	2.3%	-3,194	-14.4%	22,254
Mason	5,455	54.2%	4,330	43.0%	278	2.8%	1,125	11.2%	10,063
Mecosta	6,491	55.5%	4,854	41.5%	352	3.0%	1,637	14.0%	11,697
Menominee	3,635	55.9%	2,729	42.0%	136	2.1%	906	13.9%	6,500
Midland	17,669	60.9%	10,607	36.5%	750	2.6%	7,062	24.4%	29,026
Missaukee	3,209	65.7%	1,541	31.6%	134	2.8%	1,668	34.1%	4,884
Monroe	24,271	51.6%	21,447	45.6%	1,281	2.8%	2,824	6.0%	46,999
Montcalm	9,866	57.5%	6,686	38.9%	621	3.6%	3,180	18.6%	17,173
Montmorency	1,912	54.0%	1,497	42.3%	131	3.7%	415	11.7%	3,540
Muskegon	22,879	46.6%	24,752	50.4%	1,440	2.9%	-1,873	-3.8%	49,071
Newaygo	8,980	61.8%	5,031	34.6%	517	3.6%	3,949	27.2%	14,528
Oakland	247,876	55.5%	191,375	42.8%	7,415	1.6%	56,501	12.7%	446,666
Oceana	4,999	60.3%	3,045	36.8%	240	2.9%	1,954	23.5%	8,284
Ogemaw	3,622	51.9%	3,095	44.3%	266	3.8%	527	7.6%	6,983
Ontonagon	1,295	51.1%	1,156	45.6%	84	3.3%	139	5.5%	2,535
Osceola	4,337	59.9%	2,642	36.5%	259	3.6%	1,695	23.4%	7,238
Oscoda	1,498	53.9%	1,158	41.7%	122	4.4%	340	12.2%	2,778
Otsego	5,085	59.5%	3,211	37.6%	249	2.9%	1,874	21.9%	8,545
Ottawa	65,892	73.6%	21,956	24.5%	1,701	1.9%	43,936	49.1%	89,549
Presque Isle	2,743	52.1%	2,365	44.9%	156	3.0%	378	7.2%	5,264
Roscommon	4,861	52.8%	4,070	44.2%	273	2.9%	791	8.6%	9,204
Saginaw	30,266	45.1%	35,370	52.7%	1,509	2.2%	-5,104	-7.6%	67,145
Sanilac	7,986	63.2%	4,288	33.9%	368	2.9%	3,698	29.3%	12,642
Schoolcraft	1,507	52.2%	1,321	45.7%	61	2.1%	186	6.5%	2,889
Shiawassee	12,266	50.5%	11,251	46.3%	769	3.1%	1,015	4.2%	24,286
St. Clair	28,666	55.4%	21,546	41.6%	1,550	3.0%	7,120	13.8%	51,762
St. Joseph	9,124	61.2%	5,308	35.6%	475	3.2%	3,816	25.6%	14,907
Tuscola	9,804	54.8%	7,530	42.1%	570	3.1%	2,274	12.7%	17,904
Van Buren	12,310	55.4%	9,250	41.6%	668	3.1%	3,060	13.8%	22,228
Washtenaw	50,394	41.7%	68,275	56.5%	2,243	1.9%	-17,881	-14.8%	120,912
Wayne	177,691	34.8%	323,762	63.5%	8,431	1.7%	-146,071	-28.7%	509,884
Wexford	5,868	58.4%	3,835	38.2%	338	3.4%	2,033	20.2%	10,041
Totals	1,607,399	50.9%	1,479,057	46.9%	70,075	2.2%	128,342	4.0%	3,156,531

Counties that flipped from Republican to Democratic

- Alger (largest city: Munising)
- Baraga (largest city: Baraga)
- Bay (largest city: Bay City)
- Eaton (largest city: Charlotte)
- Ingham (largest city: Lansing)
- Manistee (largest city: Manistee)
- Marquette (largest city: Marquette)
- Muskegon (largest city: Muskegon)
- Saginaw (largest city: Saginaw)

==== By congressional district ====
Snyder won nine of 14 congressional districts.

District	Snyder	Schauer	Representative
1st	54.0%	43.28%	Dan Benishek
2nd	62.7%	34.87%	Bill Huizenga
3rd	60.6%	37.18%	Justin Amash
4th	55.1%	42.05%	John Moolenaar
5th	39.95%	57.59%	Dan Kildee
6th	55.91%	41.21%	Fred Upton
7th	54.37%	43.29%	Tim Walberg
8th	58.07%	39.99%	Mike Bishop
9th	47.19%	50.68%	Sander Levin
10th	59.08%	38.42%	Candice Miller
11th	62.31%	36.02%	David Trott
12th	41.27%	56.53%	Debbie Dingell
13th	20.26%	78.15%	John Conyers Jr.
14th	27.52%	71.43%	Brenda Lawrence

== See also ==
- 2014 United States Senate election in Michigan
- 2014 Michigan Attorney General election
- 2014 Michigan Secretary of State election
- 2014 United States gubernatorial elections
- 2014 United States elections
- 2014 Michigan elections
