= Ed LaForge =

American politician (1935–2018)

Member of the Michigan House of Representatives from the 60th district
- In office January 1, 1995 – December 31, 2000
- Preceded by: Mary Brown
- Succeeded by: Alexander Lipsey

Personal details
- Born: November 22, 1935 Pontiac, Michigan
- Died: January 19, 2018 (aged 82) Lawton, Michigan
- Party: Democratic

Edward J. LaForge (November 22, 1935 – January 19, 2018) was an American politician.

LaForge was born in Pontiac, Michigan. He received his associate degree in nursing from the Kalamazoo Valley Community College. LaForge also went to Western Michigan University and the Bronson Hospital School of Nursing. He also worked as a plumber and served in the Michigan National Air Guard from 1954 to 1960.

== Political career ==
LaForge moved to Kalamazoo from Portage, Michigan, and served as a Kalamazoo City Commissioner for ten years. He was a member of the Michigan House of Representatives from the 60th district between 1994 and 2000. Due to term limits, he stepped down and subsequently ran for the state senate in 2002, although his campaign was unsuccessful.

== Death ==
LaForge had been battling heart disease and died at his home in Lawton, Michigan, on January 19, 2018, at the age of 82.
