= Alexander Lipsey =

American politician and Circuit Court Judge

The Honorable Alexander C. Lipsey

Judge of the 9th Judicial Circuit Court of Michigan
- Incumbent
- Assumed office July 19, 2007
- Appointed by: Jennifer Granholm
- Preceded by: Philip Schaefer

Member of the Michigan House of Representatives from the 60th district
- In office January 1, 2001 – December 31, 2006
- Preceded by: Edward LaForge
- Succeeded by: Robert Jones

Personal details
- Born: November 7, 1950 (age 75)
- Party: Democratic
- Education: University of Michigan Law School; Kalamazoo College

Alexander "Sandy" Lipsey is a Democratic politician from the U.S. state of Michigan. As a member of the Michigan State House of Representatives, he represented the 60th District from 2000 to 2006. On July 20, 2007, Lipsey was appointed by Michigan Governor Jennifer Granholm to replace Judge Philip Schaefer on the Kalamazoo County Circuit Court.

== Education ==
Lipsey earned his Juris Doctor from the University of Michigan Law School and his bachelor's degree from Kalamazoo College.

== Political career ==
Constrained by state term limits, Lipsey placed an unsuccessful bid for the Michigan State Senate in 2006, facing defeat to incumbent state senator Tom George of Portage, Michigan.
