= Mary Brown (Michigan politician) =

American politician (1935–2021)

Mary C. Brown

Member of the Michigan House of Representatives
- In office January 1, 1977 – December 31, 1994
- Preceded by: Howard Wolpe
- Succeeded by: Ed LaForge
- Constituency: 46th district (1977–1992); 60th district (1993–1994)

Personal details
- Born: August 18, 1935 Midland, Michigan, U.S.
- Died: November 21, 2021 (aged 86)
- Party: Democratic
- Education: Syracuse University (M.S.); Albion College (A.B.)

Mary Carney Brown (August 18, 1935 – November 21, 2021) was an American politician who served as a Democratic member of the Michigan House of Representatives from 1977 through 1994.

Born in 1935 in Midland, Michigan, Brown earned degrees from Albion College and Syracuse University. She was an assistant professor at Western Michigan University from 1965 until her election.

Elected to the House in 1976, Brown chaired several committees and the Democratic Caucus. She held hearings on issues including pay equity and domestic violence. Governor James Blanchard appointed her to a task force set up to eliminate wage disparities between men and women in the state civil service.

Ten years after leaving the House, Brown was twice appointed to the Natural Resources Commission by Governor Jennifer Granholm and served through 2011.

In 2007, Brown was inducted into the Michigan Women's Hall of Fame. She died on November 21, 2021, at the age of 86.
