= Michigan's 62nd House of Representatives district =

American legislative district

Michigan's 62nd State House of Representatives district
Representative
Alicia St. Germaine; R–Harrison Township
- Demographics: 77.7% White; 12.8% Black; 2.9% Hispanic; 1.4% Asian; 0.2% Native American; 0.1% Hawaiian/Pacific Islander; 0.3% Other; 4.7% Multiracial
- Population (2024): 89,732

Michigan's 62nd House of Representatives district (also referred to as Michigan's 62nd House district) is a legislative district within the Michigan House of Representatives located in part of Macomb County. The district was created in 1965, when the Michigan House of Representatives district naming scheme changed from a county-based system to a numerical one.

== List of representatives ==
Representative	Party	Dates	Residence	Notes
Arthur James Law	Democratic	1965–1972	Pontiac	
Charlie James Harrison Jr.	Democratic	1973–1980	Pontiac	
L. Jean Willoughby	Republican	1981–1982	Bloomfield Hills	
Charlie James Harrison Jr.	Democratic	1983–1992	Pontiac	
Bill Martin	Republican	1993–1994	Battle Creek	
Eric Thomas Bush	Republican	1995–1996	Battle Creek	
Mark Schauer	Democratic	1997–2002	Battle Creek	
Mike Nofs	Republican	2003–2008	Battle Creek	Lived in Marshall until around 2005.
Kate Segal	Democratic	2009–2014	Battle Creek	
John Bizon	Republican	2015–2018	Battle Creek	
Jim Haadsma	Democratic	2019–2022	Battle Creek	
Alicia St. Germaine	Republican	2023–present	Harrison Township	

== Recent elections ==
=== 2020s ===
2026 Michigan House of Representatives election
Party	Candidate	Votes	%
Republican	Alicia St. Germaine (incumbent)	21,559	50.92
Democratic	Matthew Smith	20,780	49.08
Total votes		42,339	100
Republican hold			

2020 Michigan House of Representatives election
Party	Candidate	Votes	%
Republican	Alicia St. Germaine	28,761	56.0
Democratic	Michelle Woodman	22,606	44.0
Total votes		51,367	100
Republican hold			

2020 Michigan House of Representatives election
Party	Candidate	Votes	%
Republican	Alicia St. Germaine	21,522	53.4
Democratic	Michael Brooks	18,766	48.7
Total votes		40,288	100
Republican hold			

2020 Michigan House of Representatives election
Party	Candidate	Votes	%
Democratic	Jim Haadsma	20,989	51.3
Republican	Dave Morgan	19,909	48.7
Total votes		40,898	100
Democratic hold			

2018 Michigan House of Representatives election
Party	Candidate	Votes	%
Democratic	Jim Haadsma	15,937	51.9
Republican	Dave Morgan	14,800	48.2
Total votes		30,737	100
Democratic gain from Republican			

2016 Michigan House of Representatives election
Party	Candidate	Votes	%
Republican	John Bizon	17,699	48.0
Democratic	James Haadsma	17,490	47.5
Libertarian	Michelle Gregoire	1,660	4.5
Total votes		36,849	100
Republican hold			

2014 Michigan House of Representatives election
Party	Candidate	Votes	%
Republican	John Bizon	11,875	51.2
Democratic	Andy Helmboldt	11,328	48.8
Total votes		23,203	100
Republican gain from Democratic			

2012 Michigan House of Representatives election
Party	Candidate	Votes	%
Democratic	Kate Segal	21,129	57.7
Republican	Mark Behnke	15,511	42.3
Total votes		36,640	100
Democratic hold			

2010 Michigan House of Representatives election
Party	Candidate	Votes	%
Democratic	Kate Segal	14,187	54.8
Republican	Steven Mobley	11,720	45.2
Total votes		25,907	100
Democratic hold			

2008 Michigan House of Representatives election
Party	Candidate	Votes	%
Democratic	Kate Segal	25,011	61.9
Republican	Greg Moore	15,419	38.1
Total votes		40,430	100
Democratic gain from Republican			

== Historical district boundaries ==
Map	Description	Apportionment Plan	Notes
	Oakland County (part): Pontiac (part)	1964 Apportionment Plan	
	Oakland County (part): Bloomfield Township (part); Pontiac (part); Waterford Township (part)	1972 Apportionment Plan	
	Oakland County (part): Keego Harbor; Pontiac; Sylvan Lake	1982 Apportionment Plan	
	Calhoun County (part): Battle Creek; Bedford Township; Emmett Township; Pennfield Township; Springfield	1992 Apportionment Plan	
	Calhoun County (part): Albion; Albion Township; Athens Township; Battle Creek (part); Bedford Township (part); Burlington Township; Clarence Township; Clarendon Township; Convis Township; Eckford Township (part); Fredonia Township (part); Homer Township; Lee Township; Leroy Township; Marengo Township; Marshall (part); Sheridan Township; Springfield; Tekonsha Township	2001 Apportionment Plan	
	Calhoun County (part): Albion; Albion Township; Battle Creek; Bedford Township; Clarence Township; Convis Township; Lee Township; Pennfield Township; Sheridan Township; Springfield	2011 Apportionment Plan	
