= Joseph Aragona =

American politician

Joe Aragona

Member of the Michigan House of Representatives from the 60th district
- Incumbent
- Assumed office January 1, 2023
- Preceded by: Julie Rogers (redistricted)

Personal details
- Born: Joseph Anthony Aragona; September 25, 1987 (age 38) Macomb County, Michigan, U.S.
- Party: Republican
- Education: Oakland University (BS); Michigan State University (MBA)

Joseph Anthony Aragona (born September 25, 1987) is an American politician serving as a member of the Michigan House of Representatives since 2023, representing the 60th district. He is a member of the Republican Party.

== Political career ==
Aragona was first elected in the 2022 election. He was re-elected in 2024.

Aragona has been reported as a potential candidate for the 2026 US House of Representatives election in Michigan's 10th congressional district, an open seat to be vacated by Republican congressman John James.

== See also ==
- Official website
- Campaign website
