= L. Jean Willoughby =

American politician

Member of the Michigan House of Representatives from the 62nd district
- In office January 1, 1981 – December 31, 1982
- Preceded by: Charlie James Harrison Jr.
- Succeeded by: Charlie James Harrison Jr.

Personal details
- Born: July 7, 1925 Peoria, Illinois
- Died: April 18, 2015 (aged 89) Oro Valley, Arizona
- Party: Republican
- Education: University of Detroit

L. Jean Willoughby (née Kauffman; July 7, 1925 – April 18, 2015) was an American politician.

== Early life and education ==
L. Jean Kauffman was born on July 7, 1925, in Peoria, Illinois, to parents Louis and Agnes Kauffman. Jean attended Academy of Our Lady. She became a registered nurse at St. Francis Hospital, after which she met her husband, William A. Willoughby. Jean and William married in 1949. Together they had six children. After having children, Jean went to college. From the University of Detroit, she earned a BA in communications and an MA in political science.

== Career ==
In 1980, Willoughby, residing in Bloomfield Hills, sought political office for the first time. She ran as a Republican against the incumbent Democratic State Representative Charlie James Harrison Jr. of Pontiac, who had already served four-terms, in the 62nd district. David Kushma of the Detroit Free Press described Willoughby's victory on November 4 as the "biggest upset" of the 1980 state house elections. Willoughby won by a slim margin of 346 votes. This was confirmed after a recount.

As state representative, Willoughby continued the support of her Democratic predecessors for state subsidies for the Pontiac Silverdome. The stadium was within the boundaries of her district. In 1981, she argued it was important for the state to continue its funding of the Silverdome as the 1982 Super Bowl was being hosted there, which would bring the state a profit.

In 1982, the state house districts were re-drawn and Willoughby was in the new 65th district. Willoughby attempted re-election against incumbent Republican State Rep. Ruth McNamee of Birmingham in the primary election. Willoughby was ultimately defeated by McNamee.

From 1983 to 1991, Willoughby worked as budget director for Oakland County.

== Personal life ==
Willoughby was Roman Catholic.

== Later life and death ==
Willoughby retired to Horseshoe Bay, Texas. There, she volunteered as a guardian ad litem for Court Appointed Special Advocates. She later moved to Tucson, Arizona. Willboughby died in her home in Oro Valley, Arizona, on April 18, 2015.
