= Kate Segal =

American politician (born 1975)

Member of the Michigan House of Representatives from the 62nd district
- In office January 1, 2009 – December 31, 2014
- Preceded by: Mike Nofs
- Succeeded by: John Bizon

Personal details
- Born: February 16, 1975 (age 51)
- Party: Democratic
- Spouse: Mike Segal

Kate Segal (born February 16, 1975) was a State Representative for the 62nd House District (in the U.S. state of Michigan), which covers much of Calhoun County and includes the cities of Battle Creek, Springfield and Albion, and seven townships: Albion, Bedford, Clarence, Convis, Lee, Pennfield, and Sheridan.

== Career ==
For the 2013-2014 session, Segal was selected to serve as the Democratic vice chair of the House Insurance Committee and will also serve on the House committees on Health Policy and Michigan Competitiveness. Segal was previously the House Democratic Floor Leader for the 2011-2012 legislative session.

As a State Representative, Segal stated that some of her priorities were to focus on making health care more affordable and accessible to all Michigan residents, creating an environment that is inviting to the businesses that will create good-paying jobs for the workers of Calhoun County, and improving schools to provide Michigan students with a quality education from an early age.

Prior to being elected to the Michigan House of Representatives, Segal served on the Calhoun County Board of Commissioners from 2002 to 2008, serving as chairwoman in her final term. Segal is deeply involved in the community and has volunteered with a number of groups such as the United Way, the Urban League of Battle Creek, the Comprehensive Senior Care Corporation, the Junior League of Battle Creek and the Region IIIB Area Agency on Aging Advisory Council. She was also a founding member and past chair of the Calhoun County Health Plan, which is now called Community HealthCare Connections.

Segal is a graduate of Kalamazoo College, where she received a bachelor's degree in sociology, with a concentration in public policy and urban affairs. She lives in Battle Creek with her husband, Mike, and their daughter, Elise.

== Committee assignments ==
2013-2014 Legislative Session

Insurance - Democratic Vice Chair

Health Policy

Michigan Competitiveness

2011-2012 Legislative Session

Agriculture

Health Policy

Insurance

House Fiscal Agency Governing Board

2009-2010 Legislative Session

Health Policy - Vice Chair

Insurance

New Economy and Quality of Life

Urban Policy

Public Employees Health Care Reform

== Duncan Aviation and the Michigan Youth ChalleNGe Academy ==
On May 21, 2009 the Michigan House of Representatives passed House Bill 4930, a bill sponsored by Segal, which modified Michigan's tax code to create a tax exemption for Duncan Aviation, a Battle Creek company specializing in the interior customization of new aircraft. Without the modification, Duncan Aviation would have transferred more than one hundred jobs from Battle Creek to its sister facility in Nebraska. By working closely with Republican Senator Jason Allen, the legislation was signed by Governor Jennifer Granholm on June 23, 2009 and became Public Act 53 of 2009. Public Act 53 of 2009 was Segal's first bill to be passed into law.

During the 2009 Michigan budget negotiations, Segal made the Michigan Youth ChalleNGe Academy (MYCA) one of her top priorities for future funding. The MYCA is a voluntary, quasi-military program run by the National Guard. The program is designed for at-risk youth who have either dropped out of high school or are at risk of dropping out. Segal advocated for full funding of the program throughout the budget process, but applauded the efforts of the bi-partisan School Aid conference committee for providing partial funding, $642,300, in its compromise budget. In an effort to save the MYCA, Segal launched an online petition, hosted a rally at the Capitol, and lobbied her fellow legislators for support.

On November 25, 2009, the Michigan Youth ChalleNGe Academy announced that it would remain operational through at least 2010.

== Electoral history ==
- 2012 General Election for State Representative - Michigan's 62nd District

Name	Votes	Percent
Kate Segal (D-Battle Creek)	21,119	57.6%
Mark Behnke (R-Battle Creek)	15,526	42.4%

- 2010 General Election for State Representative - Michigan's 62nd District

Name	Votes	Percent
Kate Segal (D-Battle Creek)	14,188	55%
Steven Mobley (R-Athens)	11,719	45%

- 2008 General Election for State Representative - Michigan's 62nd District

Name	Votes	Percent
Kate Segal (D-Battle Creek)	25,011	62%
Greg Moore (R-Athens)	15,419	38%

- 2008 Primary Election for State Representative - Michigan's 62nd District

Name	Votes	Percent
Kate Segal (D)	3,553	68%
Tim Nendorf (D)	1,667	32%
