= Jim Haadsma =

American politician (born 1958)

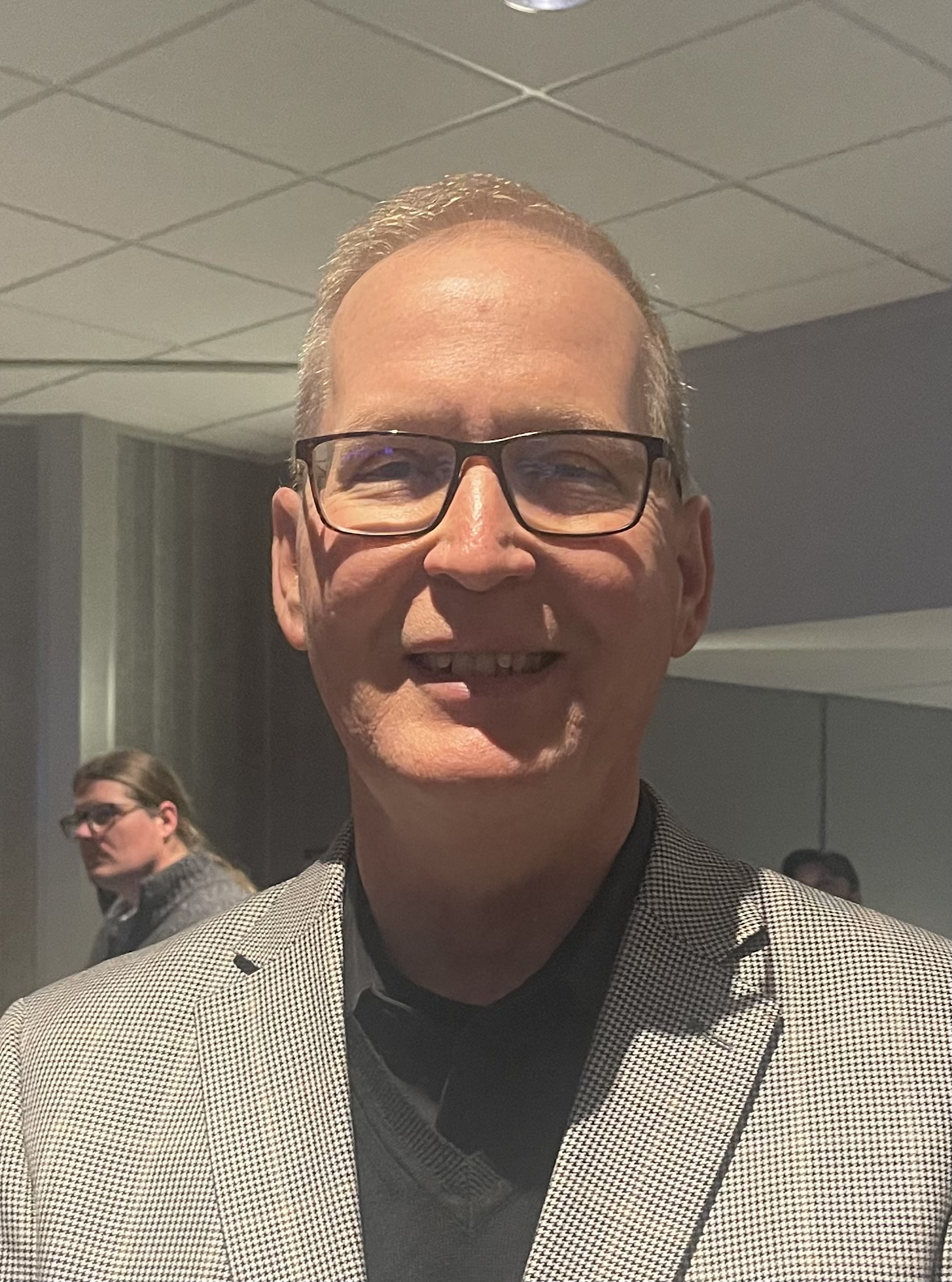

Member of the Michigan House of Representatives
- In office January 1, 2019 – December 31, 2024
- Preceded by: John Bizon
- Succeeded by: Steve Frisbie
- Constituency: 62nd district (2019–2023); 44th district (2023–2024)

Personal details
- Born: January 27, 1958 (age 68)
- Party: Democratic
- Children: 4
- Education: Michigan State University; Wayne State University Law School
- Website: Jim Haadsma

James T. Haadsma (born January 27, 1958) is a Democratic politician. He served as a member of the Michigan House of Representatives, representing the 44th district, from 2019 to 2024.

Before being elected to the state legislature, Haadsma was admitted to the State Bar of Michigan in 1984.

Political offices
Preceded by John Bizon	Michigan Representatives; 62nd District; 2019–2023	Succeeded by Alicia St. Germaine
Preceded by Matt Maddock	Michigan Representatives; 44th District; 2023–2025	Succeeded by Steve Frisbie
