= Alicia St. Germaine =

American politician from Michigan

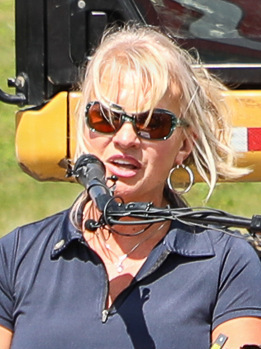
- St. Germaine in 2026

Member of the Michigan House of Representatives from the 62nd district
- Incumbent
- Assumed office January 1, 2023
- Preceded by: Jim Haadsma (redistricting)

Personal details
- Party: Republican

Alicia St. Germaine is an American politician serving as a member of the Michigan House of Representatives since 2023, representing the 62nd district. She is a member of the Republican Party.

== Political career ==
St. Germaine was first elected in the 2022 election. She was re-elected in 2024.

== See also ==
- Official website
- Campaign website
