= Michigan's 60th House of Representatives district =

American legislative district

Michigan's 60th State House of Representatives district
Representative
Joseph Aragona; R–Clinton Township, Macomb County
- Demographics: 82% White; 6.9% Black; 2.5% Hispanic; 3.9% Asian; 0.2% Native American; 0.3% Other; 4.3% Multiracial
- Population (2024): 92,684

Michigan's 60th House of Representatives district (also referred to as Michigan's 60th House district) is a legislative district within the Michigan House of Representatives located in part of Macomb County. The district was created in 1965, when the Michigan House of Representatives district naming scheme changed from a county-based system to a numerical one.

== List of representatives ==
Representative	Party	Dates	Residence	Notes
Clifford H. Smart	Republican	1965–1972	Walled Lake	
Loren D. Anderson	Republican	1973–1974	Pontiac	
Claude A. Trim	Democratic	1975–1982	Pontiac	Lived in Davisburg until around 1981.
Bill Bullard Jr.	Republican	1983–1992	Highland Township	Lived in Milford until around 1989.
Mary Brown	Democratic	1993–1994	Kalamazoo	
Ed LaForge	Democratic	1995–2000	Kalamazoo	
Alexander Lipsey	Democratic	2001–2006	Kalamazoo	
Robert Jones	Democratic	2007–2010	Kalamazoo	Died in office.
Sean McCann	Democratic	2011–2014	Kalamazoo	
Jon Hoadley	Democratic	2015–2020	Kalamazoo	
Julie Rogers	Democratic	2021–2022	Kalamazoo	
Joseph Aragona	Republican	2023–present	Clinton Township	

== Recent elections ==
=== 2020s ===
2026 Michigan House of Representatives election
Party	Candidate	Votes	%
Republican	Joseph Aragona (incumbent)	25,435	54.79
Democratic	Amy Gray	20,985	45.21
Total votes		46,420	100
Republican hold			

2024 Michigan House of Representatives election
Party	Candidate	Votes	%
Republican	Joseph Aragona	33,949	62.2
Democratic	Shelly Fraley	20,654	37.8
Total votes		54,603	100
Republican hold			

2022 Michigan House of Representatives election
Party	Candidate	Votes	%
Republican	Joseph Aragona	24,389	58.4
Democratic	Linda Rose Clor	17,360	41.6
Total votes		41,749	100
Republican hold			

2020 Michigan House of Representatives election
Party	Candidate	Votes	%
Democratic	Julie Rogers	30,037	71.4
Republican	Gary Mitchell	10,043	23.9
Democratic	Stephanie Moore (Write-in)	1,980	4.7
Total votes		42,060	100
Democratic hold			

2018 Michigan House of Representatives election
Party	Candidate	Votes	%
Democratic	Jon Hoadley	26,772	76.6
Republican	William Baker	8,181	23.4
Total votes		34,953	100
Democratic hold			

2016 Michigan House of Representatives election
Party	Candidate	Votes	%
Democratic	Jon Hoadley	26,570	69.3
Republican	Alexander Ross	9,595	25.0
Libertarian	Logan Fleckenstein	2,170	5.7
Total votes		38,335	100
Democratic hold			

2014 Michigan House of Representatives election
Party	Candidate	Votes	%
Democratic	Jon Hoadley	15,514	70.1
Republican	Michael Perrin	6,611	29.9
Total votes		22,125	100
Democratic hold			

2012 Michigan House of Representatives election
Party	Candidate	Votes	%
Democratic	Sean McCann	27,378	74.2
Republican	Michael Perrin	9,504	25.8
Total votes		36,882	100
Democratic hold			

2010 Michigan House of Representatives election
Party	Candidate	Votes	%
Democratic	Sean McCann	13,841	63.3
Republican	Jeff Fernandez	8,022	36.7
Total votes		21,863	100
Democratic hold			

2008 Michigan House of Representatives election
Party	Candidate	Votes	%
Democratic	Robert Jones	30,135	73.9
Republican	Charles Ybema	10,658	26.1
Total votes		40,793	100
Democratic hold			

== Historical district boundaries ==
Map	Description	Apportionment Plan	Notes
	Genesee County (part): Argentine Township; Fenton; Fenton Township; Mundy Township; Oakland County (part): Brandon Township; Commerce Township; Groveland Township; Highland Township; Holly Township; Lyon Township; Milford Township; Northville (part); Novi Township; Rose Township; South Lyon; Walled Lake; Wixom	1964 Apportionment Plan	
	Oakland County (part): Brandon Township; Groveland Township; Highland Township; Holly Township; Independence Township; Rose Township; Springfield Township; Waterford Township	1972 Apportionment Plan	
	Oakland County (part): Groveland Township; Highland Township; Holly Township; Lyon Township; Milford Township; Northville; Novi; Novi Township; Rose Township; South Lyon	1982 Apportionment Plan	
	Kalamazoo County (part): Kalamazoo; Kalamazoo Township (part); Parchment; Portage (part)	1992 Apportionment Plan	
	Kalamazoo County (part): Cooper Township; Kalamazoo; Kalamazoo Township (part); Portage (part)	2001 Apportionment Plan	
	Kalamazoo County (part): Kalamazoo; Kalamazoo Township (part); Portage	2011 Apportionment Plan	
