= Mike Nofs =

American politician

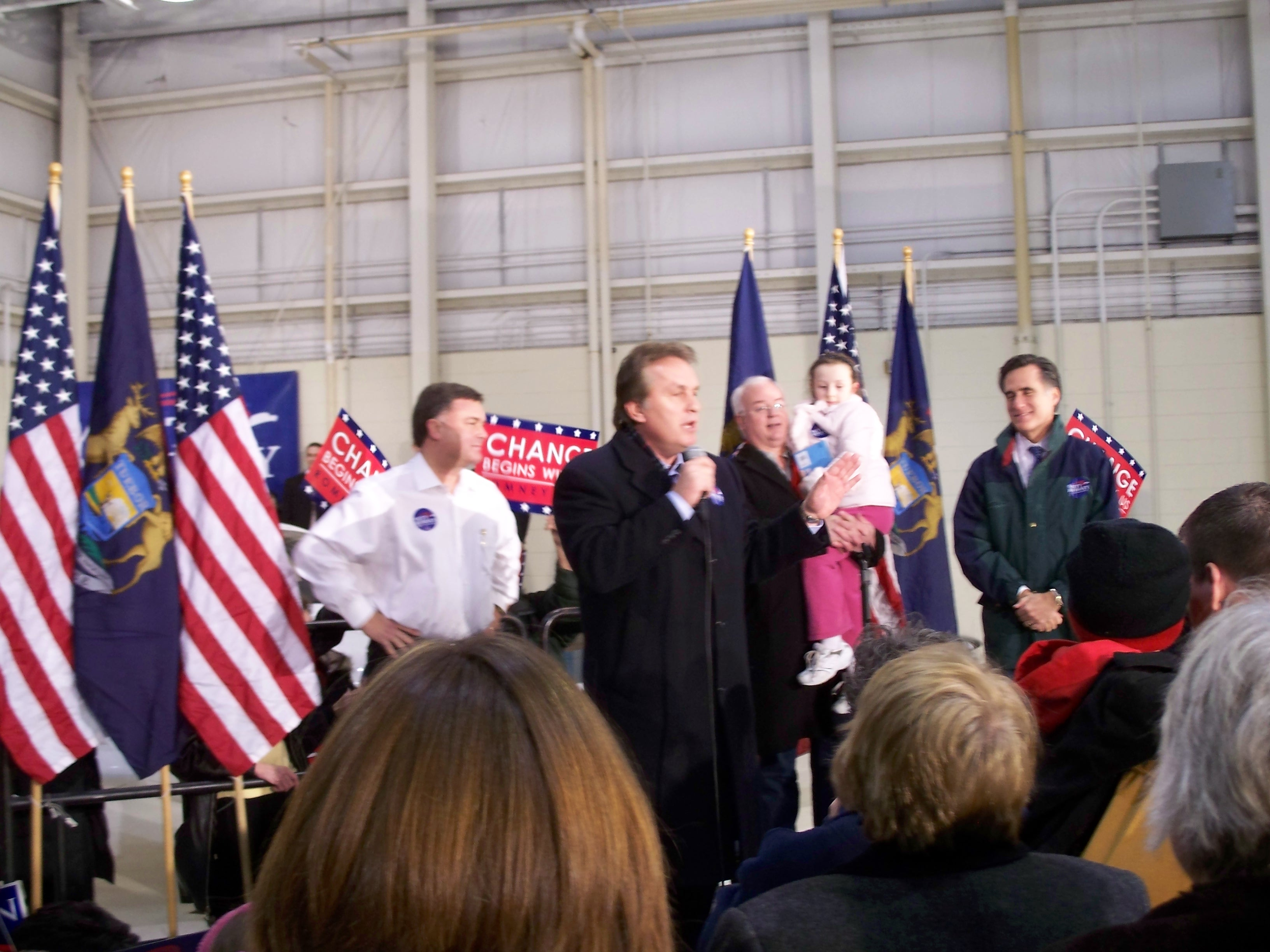
- Nofs introducing Mitt Romney at a rally in 2008

Member of the Michigan Senate from the 19th district
- In office November 9, 2009 – December 31, 2018
- Preceded by: Mark Schauer
- Succeeded by: John Bizon

Member of the Michigan House of Representatives from the 62nd district
- In office January 1, 2003 – December 31, 2008
- Preceded by: Mark Schauer
- Succeeded by: Kate Segal

Personal details
- Born: November 19, 1953 (age 72) Eaton Rapids, Michigan, U.S.
- Party: Republican
- Education: Spring Arbor College
- Website: State Sen. Mike Nofs

Mike Nofs (born November 19, 1953) is a Republican politician from Michigan who served in the Michigan Senate from 2009 until 2018 for the 19th district. Nods previously served three terms in the Michigan House of Representatives. He was elected to the Senate in a special election after Mark Schauer resigned upon his election to the United States House of Representatives in 2008 (incidentally, Nofs had succeeded Schauer in the State House when the latter was term-limited out of that chamber).

Prior to his election to the legislature, Nofs had a career in law enforcement, including as post commander of the Battle Creek Post for the Michigan State Police. He also served for ten years on the Calhoun County Board of Commissioners, including five years as chairman.
