= Robert Jones (Michigan politician) =

American politician (1944–2010)

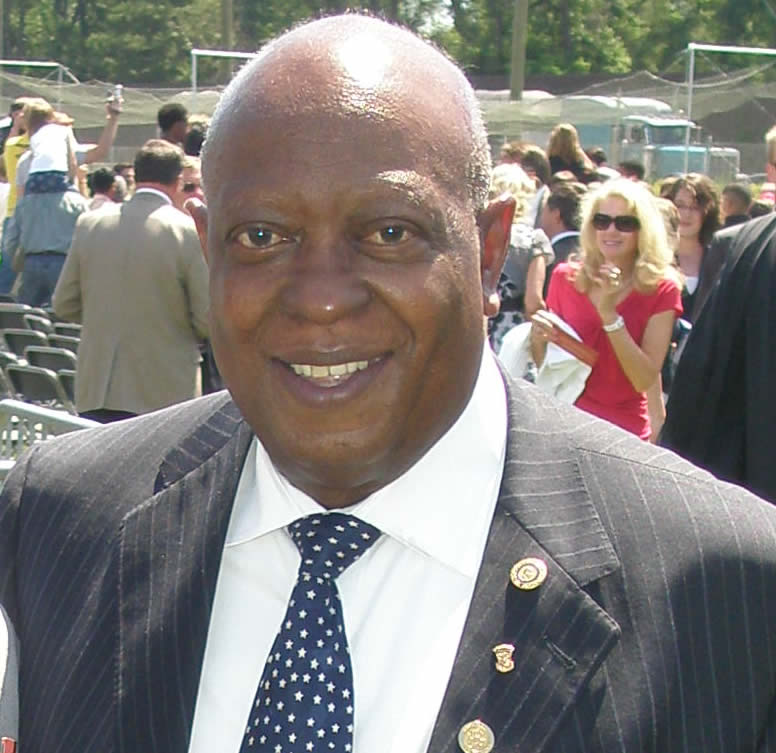

Member of the Michigan House of Representatives from the 60th district
- In office January 1, 2007 – October 17, 2010
- Preceded by: Alexander Lipsey
- Succeeded by: Sean McCann

Mayor of Kalamazoo
- In office 1997 – 2005

Personal details
- Born: April 22, 1944 Jeffersonville, Georgia
- Died: October 17, 2010 (aged 66) Kalamazoo, Michigan
- Party: Democratic
- Spouse: Callie Baskerville-Jones
- Profession: Politician

Robert B. Jones (April 22, 1944 – October 17, 2010) was an American politician from the state of Michigan. He served four consecutive terms as the Mayor of Kalamazoo from 1997 to 2005. A Democrat, he was elected to the Michigan State House of Representatives in 2006 and 2008, representing the 60th District in Kalamazoo County, which includes the City of Kalamazoo, Cooper Township and part of Kalamazoo Township. He was the Democratic nominee for the Michigan Senate's 20th district in the November 2, 2010 election until his death 16 days before.

== Early life ==
Jones was born in Jeffersonville, Georgia on April 22, 1944. He attended public schools in Brooklyn and graduated from John Jay High School in 1962. In 1966 he earned a Bachelor of Science degree in chemistry from Fort Valley State University in Georgia. A Master's Degree in chemistry was earned in 1971 at Clark Atlanta University. At the time of his death, he was working on a Master of Business Administration degree at Western Michigan University.

For 28 years, he worked as a research chemist and a "fine chemicals" supervisor at The Upjohn Company in Kalamazoo, Michigan.

== Political career ==
Jones was elected mayor of Kalamazoo in 1997. As mayor, he presided over significant economic growth, focusing large amounts of money on attracting new developments in the downtown area. He was re-elected mayor three consecutive times, serving a total of 4 terms until 2005. In 2006, he was elected to the Michigan State House to replace term-limited Representative Alexander Lipsey. He chaired the Commerce, and sat on Health Policy, Senior Health, Security and Retirement, and Tax Policy Committees.

Representative Robert Jones announced he would forgo a third term in the Michigan House of Representatives and would instead run for the vacated Michigan State Senate seat from current term limited Republican Tom George. A formal announcement was made on Monday, July 20.

Robert Jones also had a political action committee called Jones Advocating for Michigan which has raised $124,950 as of August 2008. Timothy Light is one of the top contributors to Jones' PAC.

He ran for the State Senate in the 20th District in 2010, to succeed term-limited Republican incumbent Tom George. Jones won the Democratic primary against law professor Mark Totten with 63% of the vote. He died 16 days before the election and was replaced on the ballot by Bobby Hopewell, the Mayor of Kalamazoo, who had Jones' widow's blessing. Republican Tonya Schuitmaker won the open seat.

== Personal life ==
Robert Jones married Callie Baskerville. Together, they had six children and one grandchild. Jones lived in Kalamazoo and was an active member of Mt. Zion Baptist Church. He was a member of Alpha Phi Alpha fraternity; a lifetime member of the NAACP; a member of the Prince Hall Grand Lodge Local 10; a member of United Core of Mayors; a member of the National Brownfield Association; a member of the National League of Cities; a member of the United States Conference of Mayors; and immediate past chair of the Michigan Legislative Black Caucus. In 2003, Jones received the National Association for the Advancement of Colored People (NAACP) Humanitarian Award.

Twenty months following a diagnosis of esophageal cancer, Jones collapsed and died at his home on W. Michigan Ave. the morning of Sunday, October 17, 2010, after attending an early-morning service at Mt. Zion Baptist Church. A public funeral was held at noon on Thursday, October 28, 2010 in Western Michigan University's Miller Auditorium. Several local newspaper, radio, and TV outlets were present to cover the event live on-line. The casket was then flown to Jeffersonville, Georgia, his birthplace, for burial.

== Electoral history ==
- 2006 election for State House
  - Robert Jones (D), 71%
  - Armando Romero (R), 29%
- 2008 election for State House
  - Robert B Jones (D), 74%
  - Charles Ybema (R), 26%
