= Sean McCann (politician) =

American politician (born 1971)

- McCann in 2026

Member-elect of the U.S. House of Representatives from Michigan's 4th district
- Assuming office January 3, 2027
- Succeeding: Bill Huizenga

Member of the Michigan Senate
- Incumbent
- Assumed office January 1, 2019
- Preceded by: Margaret O'Brien
- Constituency: 20th district (2019–2023); 19th district (2023–present)

Member of the Michigan House of Representatives from the 60th district
- In office January 1, 2011 – December 31, 2014
- Preceded by: Robert Jones
- Succeeded by: Jon Hoadley

Personal details
- Born: Sean Andrew McCann; September 21, 1971 (age 55) Detroit, Michigan, U.S.
- Citizenship: American; Citizen Potawatomi Nation
- Party: Democratic
- Spouse: Priscilla
- Children: 2
- Education: Western Michigan University (BA)
- Website: State Senate website

Sean Andrew McCann (born September 21, 1971) is an American politician serving as the senator for the Michigan Senate's 19th district. He formerly represented the 20th senate district. He is a former member of the Michigan House of Representatives, who represented the 60th district. A member of the Democratic Party, McCann is the member-elect of the United States House of Representatives for Michigan's 4th congressional district after defeating Republican incumbent Bill Huizenga in the 2026 election. This made him the first Native American elected to represent Michigan in Congress.

The district serves much of southwestern Michigan, including McCann's hometown of Kalamazoo as well as Holland, Battle Creek, and Benton Harbor.

== Personal life and education ==
McCann graduated from Western Michigan University in 1993 with a degree in political science. He is a member of the Citizen Potawatomi Nation.

== Career ==
=== Local and state politics ===
Following McCann's graduation, he became executive director of the Vine Neighborhood Association. While working with Vine, McCann was elected to the Kalamazoo, Michigan, city commission in 1999. McCann served on the commission for ten years. He was elected to the Michigan House in 2010, defeating Republican Jeff Fernandez.

In 2013, he proposed the creation of an independent commission to draw legislative districts in the state, in order to help prevent gerrymandering. He also worked for the Kalamazoo Red Cross.

In 2014, he ran against Republican Party nominee Margaret O'Brien and Libertarian Party nominee Lorence Wenke for the 20th district seat in the Michigan Senate. He lost to O'Brien after a recount widened her margin of victory from 59 votes to 61 votes.

In 2018, in a rematch, McCann defeated O'Brien with 60,523 votes to O'Brien's 48,197 votes.

=== Congress ===
McCann was the Democratic nominee in the 4th district against Republican Bill Huizenga, who was seeking his third term in the district after six terms in the neighboring 2nd district.

On election night, McCann led Huizenga, 50 percent to 48 percent. He declared victory early Wednesday morning, with the AP and most news outlets following suit later that day. Ultimately, McCann won by running up a 34,500-vote margin in his native Kalamazoo County, almost six times his overall margin of 6,700 votes. This made him the first Native American elected to represent Michigan in Congress. His win also gave the Democrats two of the three seats anchored in traditionally Republican West Michigan, with Hillary Scholten winning reelection in the neighboring Grand Rapids-based 3rd district.

U.S. House of Representatives
Preceded by Bill Huizenga	Member of the U.S. House of Representatives from Michigan's 4th congressional district Taking office 2027	Elect
