= Mackinac Republican Leadership Conference =

Biennial U.S. Republican Party political conference held on Mackinac Island, Michigan

- Mackinac Conference
- U.S. National Historic Landmark District – Contributing property
- Michigan State Historic Site
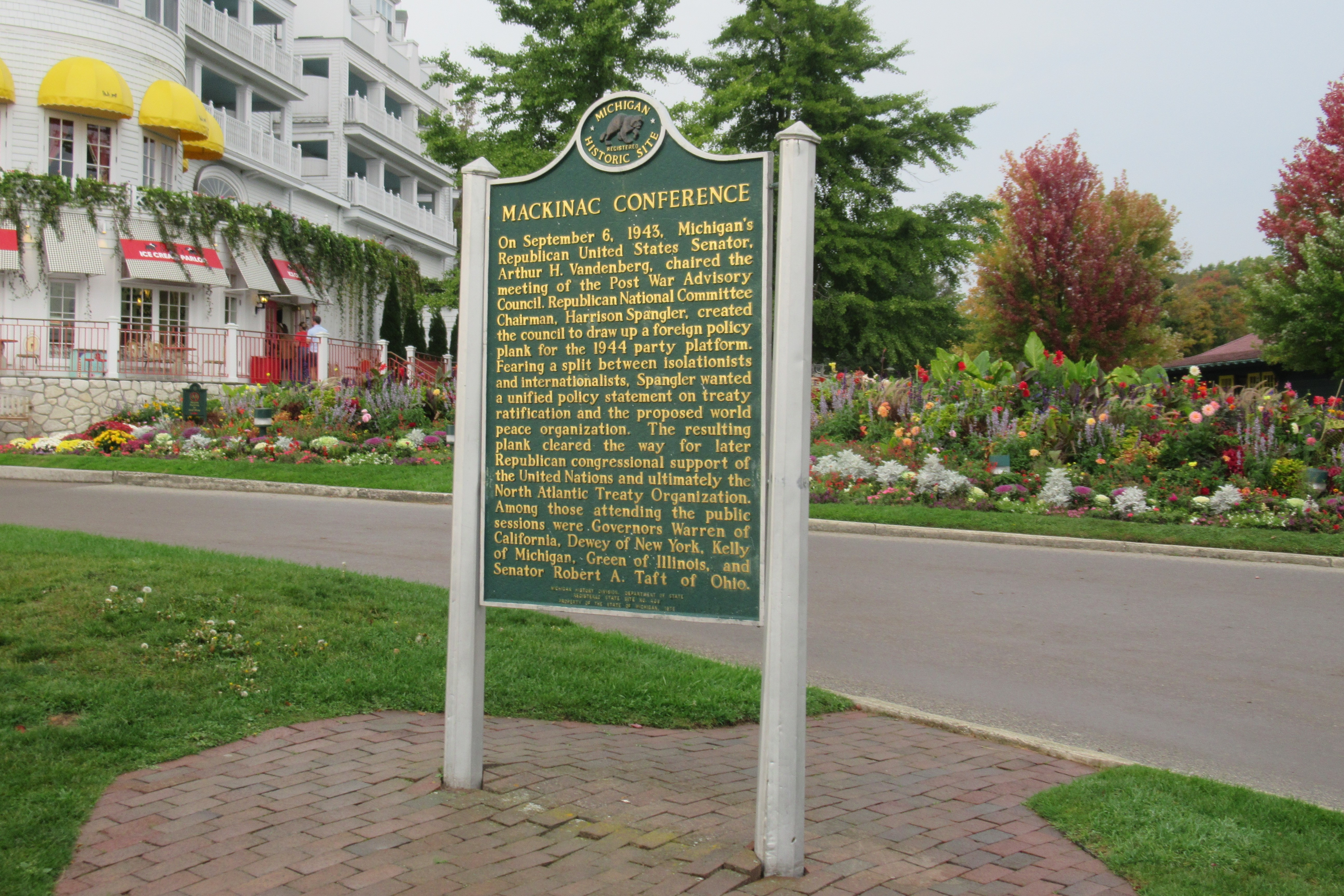
- Michigan state historic marker

- Location within Michigan Location within the United States
- Location: Grand Hotel Avenue; Mackinac Island, Michigan
- Coordinates: 45°51′02″N 84°37′30″W
- Part of: Mackinac Island (ID66000397)

Significant dates
- Designated NHLDCP: October 15, 1966
- Designated MSHS: August 15, 1975

The Mackinac Republican Leadership Conference, also known as the Midwest Mackinac Republican Leadership Conference, is a biennial United States Republican Party political conference held on Mackinac Island, Michigan.

The conference was first founded in 1953.

== Dates ==
- 2023: September 22–24, 2023 - “Party of the Constitution”
- 2021: September 24–26, 2021 - "All in Michigan"
- 2019: September 20–22, 2019 - "Growth, Opportunity, Prosperity"
- 2017: September 22–24, 2017 - "Together We Rise"
- 2015: September 18–20, 2015 – "Michigan: Foundation For the Future"
- 2013: September 20–22, 2013 - 30th event
- 2011: September 23–25, 2011
- 2009: September 25–27, 2009
- 2007: September 21–23, 2007 – "Relying on our Roots"
- 2005: September 23–25, 2005 – "Make Every Day Count"
- 2003: September 18–21, 2003
- 2001: September 21–23, 2001
- 1999: September 17–19, 1999

== Notable Guests ==
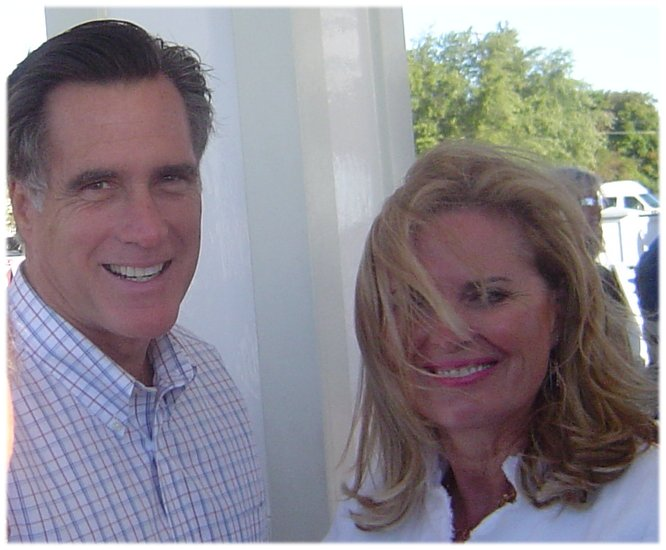
Mitt Romney with his wife Ann at the 2007 convention

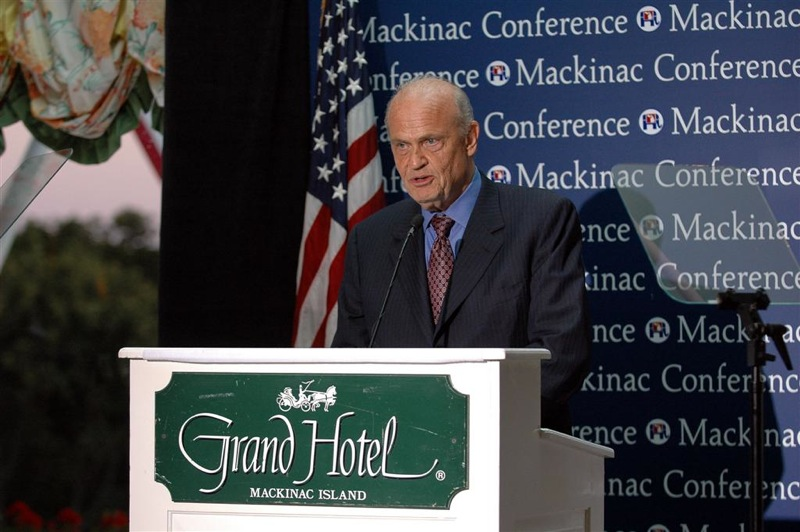
Fred Thompson speaking at the 2007 convention

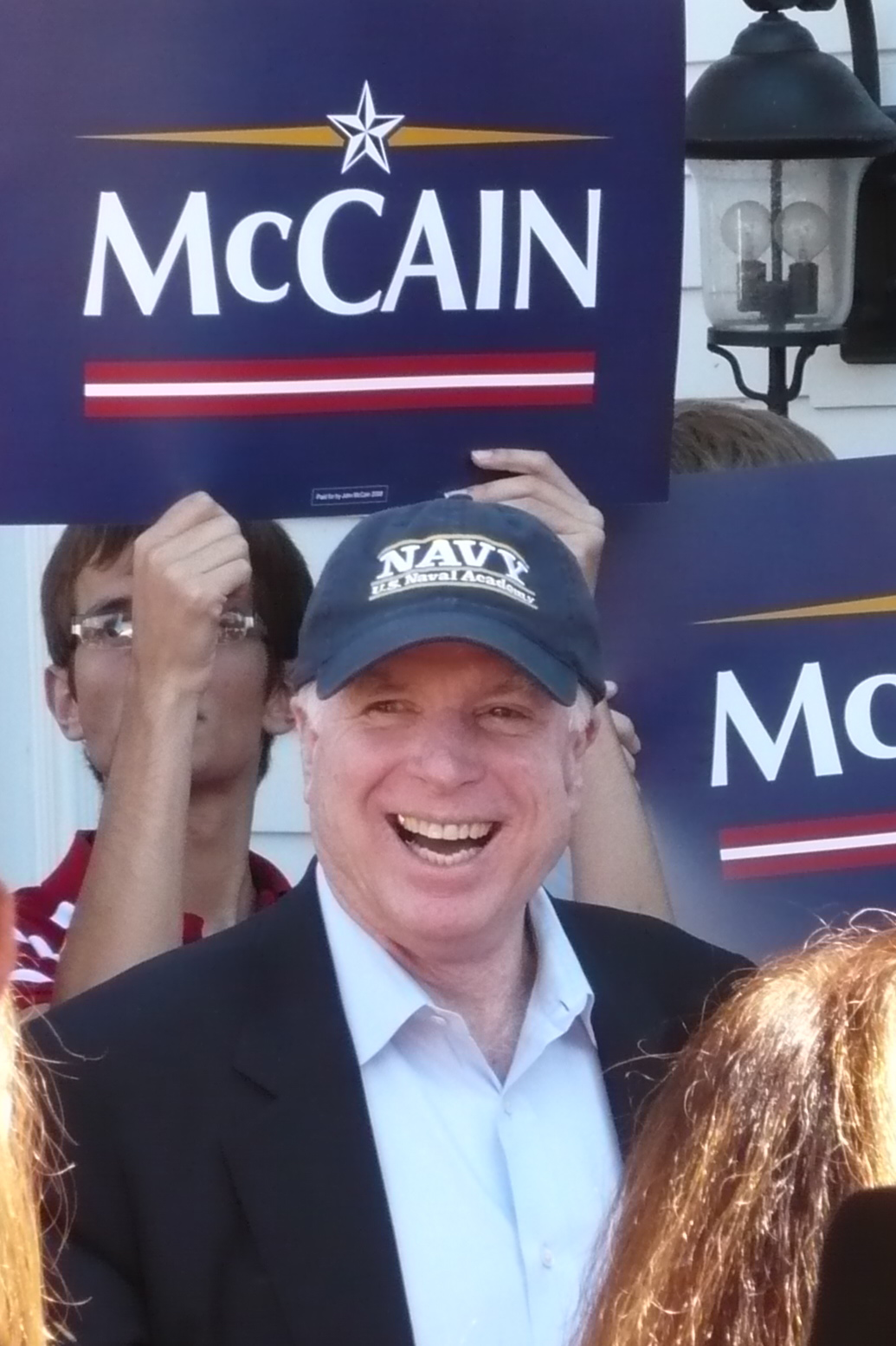
John McCain at the 2007 convention

- 2023 (attended): political candidate Kari Lake; actor Jim Caviezel; author ZUBY; journalist Alex Newman; presidential candidate Vivek Ramaswamy; statesman Alan Keyes; RNC Committeewoman Tamara Scott; emergency physician Dr. Chuck Thurston; social commentator Leah Southwell
- 2023: (invited): author Dinesh D'Souza; political candidate Kari Lake; actor Jim Caviezel; author ZUBY; journalist Alex Newman; presidential candidate Vivek Ramaswamy; statesman Alan Keyes; RNC Committeewoman Tamara Scott; emergency physician Dr. Chuck Thurston; social commentator Leah Southwell
- 2021 (attended): RNC Chairwoman Ronna Romney McDaniel; Senator Ted Cruz; Senator Lindsey Graham; South Dakota Governor Kristi Noem; Rep. Nancy Mace
- 2021 (invited): Vice President Mike Pence; RNC Chairwoman Ronna Romney McDaniel; Senator Ted Cruz; Senator Lindsey Graham; UN Ambassador Nikki Haley; South Dakota Governor Kristi Noem; Rep. Nancy Mace
- 2019: Rep. Dan Crenshaw; Education Secretary Betsy DeVos; Republican leader Kevin McCarthy; Vice President Mike Pence; former Mississippi Governor Haley Barbour
- 2017 (attended): RNC Chairwoman Ronna Romney McDaniel; Education Secretary Betsy DeVos, Missouri Gov. Eric Greitens, Utah Congressman Jason Chaffetz, former Michigan governor John Engler, Kentucky governor Matt Bevin, House Majority leader Kevin McCarthy.
- 2017 (invited): RNC Chairwoman Ronna Romney McDaniel; President Donald Trump, Vice President Mike Pence, Education Secretary Betsy DeVos, UN Ambassador Nikki Haley, New Mexico Gov. Susana Martinez; Missouri Gov. Eric Greitens, Utah Congressman Jason Chaffetz, former Michigan governor John Engler, Kentucky governor Matt Bevin, House Majority leader Kevin McCarthy.
- 2015 (attended): Jeb Bush, Senator Ted Cruz, Carly Fiorina, Governor John Kasich, Senator Rand Paul, Governor Rick Snyder
- 2015 (invited): Jeb Bush, Senator Ted Cruz, Carly Fiorina, Governor Scott Walker, Governor John Kasich, Senator Rand Paul, Governor Rick Snyder
- 2013 (attended): Karl Rove, Senator Rand Paul, Governor Scott Walker, Governor Bobby Jindal, Reince Priebus, Senator John Thune
- 2013 (invited): Congressman Paul Ryan, Karl Rove, Congressman Sean Duffy, Senator Marco Rubio, Governor Jeb Bush, Senator Rand Paul, Governor Scott Walker, Mayor Mia Love, Speaker John Boehner
- 2011: Mitt Romney, Rick Perry, Nikki Haley, Susana Martinez, Reince Priebus, Rick Snyder, Thaddeus McCotter
- 2009: Mitt Romney, Tim Pawlenty, Ari Fleischer, Congressman Eric Cantor, Governor John Engler
- 2007: Duncan Hunter, Rudy Giuliani, Tom Tancredo, Ron Paul, Sam Brownback, Newt Gingrich, Mike Huckabee, Mitt Romney, Fred Thompson, John McCain
- 2005: Sam Brownback, Mitt Romney
- 2003: Lynne Cheney, Ken Mehlman
- 1999: Gary Bauer, Alan Keys, Steve Forbes, Vern Ehlers
- 1997: Newt Gingrich, John Kasich, Spencer Abraham, Jim Nicholson
- 1995: Bob Dole, Newt Gingrich, Phil Gramm
- 1987: Pat Robertson, Bob Dole
- 1985: Bob Dole, Jack Kemp, James Baker
