= Level Park–Oak Park, Michigan =

Level Park-Oak Park, Michigan
- Census-designated place (CDP) & unincorporated community
- Location of Level Park–Oak Park, Michigan
- Coordinates: 42°21′38″N 85°15′29″W
- Country: United States
- State: Michigan
- County: Calhoun
- Township: Bedford

Area
  - Total: 5.25 sq mi (13.61 km^{2})
  - Land: 5.20 sq mi (13.47 km^{2})
  - Water: 0.054 sq mi (0.14 km^{2})
- Elevation: 863 ft (263 m)

Population (2020)
  - Total: 3,260
  - Density: 626.8/sq mi (242.02/km^{2})
- Time zone: UTC-5 (Eastern (EST))
  - Summer (DST): UTC-4 (EDT)
- FIPS code: 26-47230
- GNIS feature ID: 2393099

Level Park–Oak Park is a census-designated place for statistical purposes in Calhoun County in the U.S. state of Michigan. The CDP population was 3,260 at the 2020 census. The CDP is immediately northwest of the city of Battle Creek and is part of the Battle Creek Metropolitan Statistical Area.

The CDP includes the unincorporated areas known as Level Park and Oak Park in Bedford Charter Township along M-89, just north of the Kalamazoo River.

- Level Park is at 42°21′37″N 85°16′21″W.
- Oak Park is at 42°21′30″N 85°15′25″W.

== Geography ==
According to the United States Census Bureau, the CDP has a total area of 5.3 square miles (13.6 km^{2}), of which 5.2 square miles (13.4 km^{2}) is land and 0.08 square miles (0.2 km^{2}), or 1.22%, is water. The Kalamazoo River forms the southern border of the CDP. Highway M-89 runs through the community as Michigan Avenue and leads southeast 5 miles (8 km) to downtown Battle Creek and west 23 miles (37 km) to Plainwell.

== Demographics ==
Historical population
Census	Pop.	Note	%±
2000	3,605		—
2010	3,409		−5.4%
2020	3,260		−4.4%
U.S. Decennial Census

As of the census of 2000, there were 3,605 people, 1,399 households, and 1,043 families residing in the CDP. The population density was 677.3 inhabitants per square mile (261.5/km^{2}). There were 1,456 housing units at an average density of 273.6 per square mile (105.6/km^{2}). The racial makeup of the CDP was 91.60% White, 4.36% Black or African American, 0.33% Native American, 0.58% Asian, 0.06% Pacific Islander, 1.05% from other races, and 2.02% from two or more races. Hispanic or Latino of any race were 1.75% of the population.

There were 1,399 households, out of which 31.2% had children under the age of 18 living with them, 58.2% were married couples living together, 11.4% had a female householder with no husband present, and 25.4% were non-families. 20.3% of all households were made up of individuals, and 8.1% had someone living alone who was 65 years of age or older. The average household size was 2.57 and the average family size was 2.95.

In the CDP, the population was spread out, with 25.4% under the age of 18, 7.3% from 18 to 24, 28.3% from 25 to 44, 25.2% from 45 to 64, and 13.8% who were 65 years of age or older. The median age was 38 years. For every 100 females, there were 99.4 males. For every 100 females age 18 and over, there were 95.6 males.

The median income for a household in the CDP was $42,388, and the median income for a family was $50,161. Males had a median income of $40,440 versus $26,127 for females. The per capita income for the CDP was $18,983. About 5.1% of families and 7.0% of the population were below the poverty line, including 6.0% of those under age 18 and 5.0% of those age 65 or over.
