= Julie Rogers (politician) =

American politician

Member of the Michigan House of Representatives
- Incumbent
- Assumed office January 1, 2021
- Preceded by: Jon Hoadley
- Succeeded by: Jen Strebs (elect)
- Constituency: 60th district (2021–2022); 41st district (2023–present)

Personal details
- Party: Democratic
- Education: Marquette University (BA, MPT)

Julie M. Rogers is an American physical therapist and politician serving as a member of the Michigan House of Representatives since 2021, currently representing the 41st district. She is a member of the Democratic Party.

== Education ==
Rogers earned a Master of Physical Therapy from Marquette University.

== Career ==
Rogers has worked as a physical therapist for 22 years. She also served as a member of the Kalamazoo Board of Commissioners from 2013 to 2021. Rogers was elected to the 60th district of the Michigan House of Representatives in November 2020 and assumed office on January 1, 2021, succeeding Jon Hoadley.

Following redistricting, Rogers ran in the 41st district in 2022, winning reelection there. She was reelected in 2024.
