= Bedford Charter Township, Michigan =

Bedford Township, Michigan
- Charter township
- Bedford Charter Township
- Location within the state of Michigan Location within the United States
- Coordinates: 42°22′23″N 85°14′18″W
- Country: United States
- State: Michigan
- County: Calhoun

Area
  - Total: 29.7 sq mi (76.9 km^{2})
  - Land: 29.1 sq mi (75.4 km^{2})
  - Water: 0.62 sq mi (1.6 km^{2})
- Elevation: 866 ft (264 m)

Population (2020)
  - Total: 9,198
  - Density: 316/sq mi (122/km^{2})
- Time zone: UTC-5 (Eastern (EST))
  - Summer (DST): UTC-4 (EDT)
- ZIP code: 49020
- Area code: 269
- FIPS code: 26-06720
- GNIS feature ID: 1625905
- Website: Official website

Bedford Charter Township is a charter township located in the northwest corner of Calhoun County in the U.S. state of Michigan. It is part of the Battle Creek, Michigan Metropolitan Statistical Area. As of the 2020 census, the township population was 9,198. Most of the township lies north of the Kalamazoo River and the city of Battle Creek. Three small noncontiguous areas of the township lie south of the Kalamazoo River.

== History ==
Bedford Township was first organized in 1839. As of 1910 it had a population of 2,076.

== Communities ==
- Much of the township is considered to be part of the Battle Creek urban area, and the township's economy is closely linked to the city. The township became a charter township in part to protect against further annexation by the city.
- Level Park-Oak Park is a census-designated place, covering an area along M-89, just north of the Kalamazoo River and just northwest of Battle Creek. It includes the unincorporated communities of Level Park and Oak Park which are adjacent areas along M-89.
- Bedford is an unincorporated community and downtown development area located on M-37 at 42°23′43″N 85°13′56″W, near the center of the township.
- Morgan Corners and Orchard Park are both settlements located along the eastern boundary with Pennfield Charter Township. Most of Orchard Park has been incorporated into Battle Creek.

== Geography ==
According to the United States Census Bureau, the township has a total area of 29.7 square miles (76.9 km^{2}), of which 29.1 square miles (75.4 km^{2}) is land and 0.62 square miles (1.6 km^{2}), or 2.03%, is water.

== Demographics ==
Historical population
Census	Pop.	Note	%±
1960	10,486		—
1970	10,817		3.2%
1980	10,157		−6.1%
1990	9,810		−3.4%
2000	9,517		−3.0%
2010	9,357		−1.7%
2020	9,198		−1.7%
Source: Census Bureau. Census 1960- 2000, 2010.

As of the census of 2000, there were 9,517 people, 3,667 households, and 2,651 families residing in the township. The population density was 324.0 inhabitants per square mile (125.1/km^{2}). There were 3,841 housing units at an average density of 130.8 per square mile (50.5/km^{2}). The racial makeup of the township was 84.05% White, 12.09% African American, 0.34% Native American, 0.43% Asian, 0.06% Pacific Islander, 0.85% from other races, and 2.18% from two or more races. Hispanic or Latino of any race were 1.49% of the population.

There were 3,667 households, out of which 30.1% had children under the age of 18 living with them, 55.9% were married couples living together, 12.4% had a female householder with no husband present, and 27.7% were non-families. 22.5% of all households were made up of individuals, and 8.9% had someone living alone who was 65 years of age or older. The average household size was 2.52 and the average family size was 2.94.

In the township the population was spread out, with 24.1% under the age of 18, 7.0% from 18 to 24, 26.9% from 25 to 44, 27.4% from 45 to 64, and 14.5% who were 65 years of age or older. The median age was 40 years. For every 100 females, there were 101.8 males. For every 100 females age 18 and over, there were 98.7 males.

The median income for a household in the township was $44,462, and the median income for a family was $51,230. Males had a median income of $37,331 versus $26,435 for females. The per capita income for the township was $20,303. About 4.3% of families and 5.8% of the population were below the poverty line, including 4.5% of those under age 18 and 6.2% of those age 65 or over.

== Notable people ==
- Eudora Stone Bumstead (1860–1892), poet, hymnwriter
