= Michigan Mega Conference =

The Michigan Mega Conference was a large high school athletic league comprising twenty-eight schools which disbanded in mid-2009, with its former members either becoming independent or forming their own leagues. Member schools were predominantly located in suburban Wayne County, Michigan, mainly in Downriver. The other schools were located in neighboring Monroe and Washtenaw Counties. The schools were also members of the Michigan High School Athletic Association and compete in the organization's post-season state championships. Depending on the sport, the schools were divided into three or four divisions.

== Controversies ==
When the MEGA Conference was formed in 1993, many schools were denied entry into the conference. The rejected schools alleged that this decision was based on their large Black student populations, claiming that the founding schools "discriminated in the formation and operation of the league."

Consequently, current member schools Dearborn Heights Robichaud and Romulus filed complaints with the Office for Civil Rights (OCR) at the United States Department of Education regarding the denial of their admission.

The OCR determined that the athletic league had violated Title VI of the Civil Rights Act of 1964. The schools declined a resolution offered by the OCR, and the matter was subsequently referred to the Justice Department in the summer of 1995.

A resolution was later reached between the eighteen founding members and the Justice Department to include the aforementioned schools along with five others—Highland Park, Inkster, River Rouge, Ypsilanti, and Ypsilanti Willow Run—resulting in an athletic conference of twenty-five schools.

== 2008 football alignments ==
=== Red ===
- Allen Park
- Belleville
- Dearborn
- Fordson
- Monroe
- Southgate Anderson
- Truman

=== White ===
- Carlson
- Edsel Ford
- Kennedy
- Lincoln Park
- Redford Union
- Roosevelt
- Trenton
- Woodhaven

=== Blue ===
- Garden City
- Highland Park
- Inkster
- Melvindale
- Romulus
- Ypsilanti

=== Gold ===
- Annapolis
- Crestwood
- Ecorse
- River Rouge
- Robichaud
- Thurston
- Willow Run

== List of MEGA Conference state champions ==
Baseball

Year	School	Class/Division
1977	Carlson	B
1984	Thurston	B
1986	Ypsilanti	A
1994	Trenton	B

Boys' basketball

Year	School	Class/Division
1952	Highland Park	A
1953	Fordson	A
1954	River Rouge	B
1955	River Rouge	B
1959	River Rouge	B
1961	River Rouge	B
1962	River Rouge	B
1963	River Rouge	B
1964	River Rouge	B
1965	River Rouge	B
1968	Willow Run	B
1969	River Rouge	B
1970	River Rouge	B
1971	River Rouge	B
1972	River Rouge	B
1975	Highland Park	A
1980	Willow Run	B
1986	Romulus	A
1998	River Rouge	B
1999	River Rouge	B

Girls' basketball

Year	School	Class/Division
1984	River Rouge	B
2002	Inkster	C

Boys' bowling

Year	School	Class
2007	Annapolis	B

Girls' competitive cheer

Year	School	Class/Division
1995	Carlson	B
2008	Carlson	2
2009	Carlson	2

Boys' cross country

Year	School	Class/Division
1953	Trenton	B
1954	River Rouge	B
1955	River Rouge	B
1957	River Rouge	B
1960	Ypsilanti	A
1981	Edsel Ford	A
1987	Dearborn	B
1988	Monroe	A
1992	Monroe	A

Girls' cross country

Year	School	Class/Division
1984	Edsel Ford	A

Football

Year	School	Class/Division
1930	Fordson	B
1943	Fordson	A
1971	Fordson	A
1990	Robichaud	B
1993	Fordson	AA

Boys' golf

Year	School	Class/Division
1954	Redford Union	B
1956	Dearborn	A
1963	Dearborn	A
2004	Trenton	II

Boys' gymnastics

Year	School	Class/Division
1970	Kennedy	OPEN
1971	Kennedy	OPEN
1972	Kennedy	OPEN
1973	Kennedy	OPEN
1976	Truman	OPEN

Girls' gymnastics

Year	School	Class/Division
1972	Kennedy	OPEN
1973	Kennedy	OPEN

Boys' ice hockey

Year	School	Class/Division
1976	Trenton	I
1979	Trenton	A
1980	Trenton	A
1982	Trenton	A
1986	Trenton	A
1989	Southgate Anderson	A
1991	Trenton	A
1996	Trenton	A
1998	Trenton	A
2003	Trenton	II
2004	Trenton	II
2008	Trenton	II
2009	Trenton	II
2010	Trenton	II

Girls' soccer

Year	School	Class/Division
1989	Dearborn	B-C-D

Softball

Year	School	Class/Division
1983	Belleville	A
1984	Belleville	A
2008	Garden City	I

Boys' swimming

Year	School	Class/Division
1952	Fordson	A
1953	Fordson	A
1954	Fordson	A
1967	Trenton	A
1971	Dearborn	A
1972	Dearborn	A
1974	Dearborn	A
1976	Dearborn	A
1986	Dearborn	B-C-D
1987	Dearborn	B-C-D

Girls' swimming

Year	School	Class/Division
1995	Trenton	B-C-D

Boys' tennis

Year	School	Class/Division
1975	Ypsilanti	A

Girls' tennis

Year	School	Class/Division
1973	Dearborn	OPEN

Boys' track

Year	School	Class/Division
1954	Inkster	B
1955	Inkster	B
1956	Inkster	B
1954	Willow Run	B
1960	Ecorse	B
1963	River Rouge	B
1964	Willow Run	B
1965	River Rouge	B
1967	Ecorse	B
1969	Redford Union	A
1969	Ecorse	B
1970	Ecorse	B
1973	Ecorse	B
1974	Robichaud	B
1975	Ecorse	B
1979	Robichaud	B
1980	Ecorse	C
1981	Ecorse	B
1985	Ecorse	C
1990	Robichaud	B
2000	Romulus	II
2006	Ypsilanti	II

Girls' track

Year	School	Class/Division
1973	Lincoln Park	OPEN
1993	Inkster	B
1994	River Rouge	B
1996	Robichaud	B
2004	Ypsilanti	II
2009	Romulus	I

Girls' volleyball

Year	School	Class/Division
1976	Fordson	A

Wrestling

Year	School	Class/Division
1956	Ypsilanti	OPEN
1961	Ypsilanti	A
1962	Ypsilanti	A
1964	Ypsilanti	A
1964	River Rouge	B-C-D

== Disbanding ==
The Mega Conference officially disbanded after the 2008 season after members of the league began to fracture off and form their own conferences, citing a desire to have more geographically centered leagues, as opposed to leagues more focused around the schools' athletic strength.

There were 2 main conferences formed from the ashes of the Mega Conference, with those being the Western Wayne Athletic Conference and the Downriver League. However, a couple of schools chose instead to join the Southeastern Conference, while a few others chose to run an independent schedule.

Western Wayne Athletic Conference	Downriver League	Southeastern Conference	Independent
Fordson	Melvindale	Monroe	Ecorse
Edsel Ford	Roosevelt	Ypsilanti	Highland Park
Dearborn	Carlson		River Rouge
Belleville	Southgate Anderson		Willow Run
Romulus	Woodhaven		Inkster
Thurston	Allen Park		
Redford Union	Trenton		
Annapolis	Kennedy		
Crestwood	Truman		
Robichaud	Lincoln Park		
Garden City			
