= Southeastern Conference (MHSAA) =

Sports conference

The Michigan High School Athletic Association Southeastern Conference (MHSAA SEC) is a high school sports conference composed of schools (all public) in four different counties in the state of Michigan. The SEC is split into two divisions, Red and White, based on enrollment. Currently, there are 14 members of the SEC.

== Member schools ==
=== Current members ===
School	Nickname	Location	Joined	Enrollment	Class	Colors	Previous Conference
Red Division
Ann Arbor Huron	River Rats	Ann Arbor	2008	1,860	A	Green and Gold	Independent
Ann Arbor Pioneer	Pioneers	Ann Arbor	1996	2,185	A	Purple and White	Independent
Ann Arbor Skyline	Eagles	Ann Arbor	2009	1,588	A	Columbia Blue and White	None (school opened)
Dexter	Dreadnaughts	Dexter	1964	1,188	A	Maroon and Gold	Washtenaw County League
Monroe	Trojans	Monroe	2009	1,838	A	Red and White	Michigan Mega Conference
Saline	Hornets	Pittsfield Township	1964	1,743	A	Navy and Gold	Washtenaw County League
Temperance Bedford	Kicking Mules	Bedford Township	2000	1,371	A	Scarlet and Gray	Great Lakes League
White Division
Adrian	Maples	Adrian	2000	759	B	Royal Blue and White	Independent
Chelsea	Bulldogs	Chelsea	1964	803	B	Navy and Gold	Washtenaw County League
Jackson	Vikings	Jackson	2018	1,195	A	Black and Orange	Capital Area Activities Conference
Pinckney	Pirates	Putnam Township	2017	837	A	Red and Black	Kensington Lakes Activities Association
Tecumseh	Indians	Tecumseh	1980	719	B	Orange and Black	Huron League
Ypsilanti	Grizzlies	Ypsilanti Township	2009	985	A	Black and Gold	Michigan Mega Conference
Ypsilanti Lincoln	Railsplitters	Augusta Township	1964	1,247	A	Royal Blue and Grey	Huron League

=== Future members ===
School	Nickname	Location	Colors	Joining	Division	Current Conference
Belleville	Tigers	Belleville		2027	Silver	KLAA
Brighton	Bulldogs	Brighton		2027	Blue	KLAA
Canton	Cobras	Canton Township		2027	Blue	KLAA
Dearborn	Pioneers	Dearborn		2027	Silver	KLAA
Dearborn Fordson	Tractors	Dearborn		2027	Silver	KLAA
Dearborn Heights Crestwood	Chargers	Dearborn Heights		2027	Silver	Western Wayne
Hartland	Eagles	Hartland Township		2027	Blue	KLAA
Howell	Highlanders	Howell		2027	Blue	KLAA
Jackson Northwest	Mounties	Blackman Township		2027	White	Interstate 8
Plymouth	Wildcats	Canton Township		2027	Blue	KLAA
Salem	Rocks	Canton Township		2027	Blue	KLAA
Wayne Memorial	Zebras	Wayne		2027	Silver	KLAA
Westland John Glenn	Rockets	Westland		2027	Silver	KLAA

=== Former members ===
School	Nickname	Location	Colors	Joined	Previous Conference	Departed	Successive Conference
Brighton (Note: Brighton will rejoin the SEC for the 2027-28 school year.)	Bulldogs	Brighton	Orange and Black	1973	Independent	1979	Kensington Valley Conference
Dundee	Vikings	Dundee	Blue and White	1965	Huron League	1972	Michigan-Ohio Border Conference
Milan	Big Reds	Milan	Red and Black	1967	Huron League	2000	Huron League
Novi	Wildcats	Novi	Green and White	1970	Independent	1979	Kensington Valley Conference
Parma Western	Panthers	Parma	Maroon, white, and gold	1980	Independent	1983	Cascades Conference
South Lyon	Lions	South Lyon	Blue and Gold	1964	Independent	1979	Kensington Valley Conference

== History ==
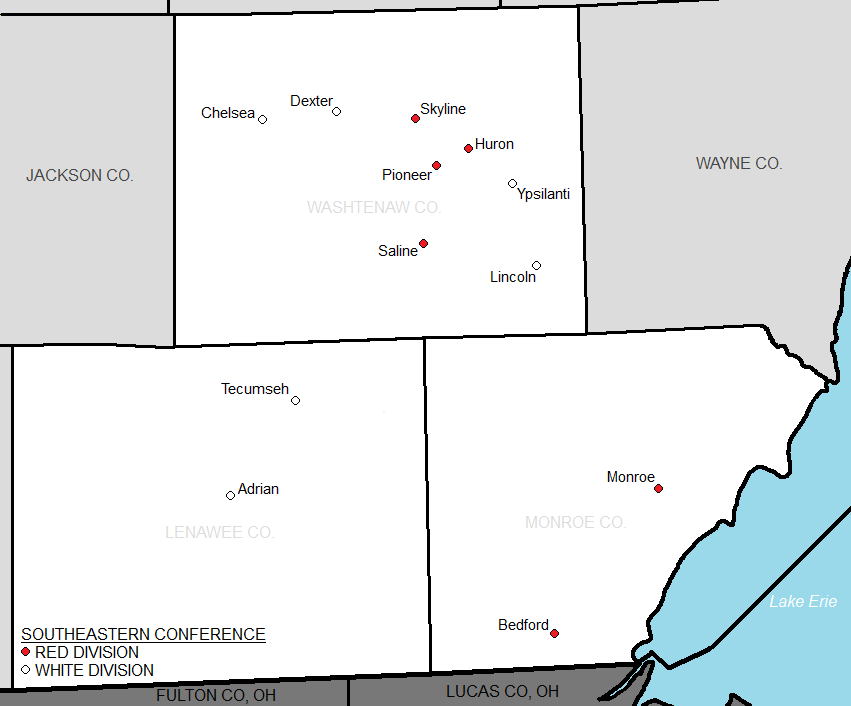
Locations of the members of the Southeastern Conference based on divisional setup.

The SEC was formed by three schools from the disbanding Washtenaw County League (Chelsea, Dexter, and Saline), two from the Huron League (Dundee and Ypsilanti Lincoln), and independent South Lyon. The league expanded to eight by 1969, with Novi joining from the Lakeland Conference that year, and Milan joining from the Huron in 1967. In 1973 Dundee left for the Michigan-Ohio Border Conference, and was replaced by Brighton, joining from the Wayne-Oakland League. 1979 also brought major change to the conference, as Brighton, Novi, and South Lyon left for the Kensington Valley Conference. Parma Western joined that year, having been independent since leaving the Cascades Conference in 1976. Tecumseh left the Huron League to join the Southeastern in 1980, bringing the conference to seven members. Western returned to the Cascades Conference in 1983, as their replacement, Pinckney, left the Kensington Valley Conference in 1984.

The league was stable until 2000, when Milan and Pinckney left for the Huron League and Kensington Valley Conference, respectively. Bedford joined from the Great Lakes League, and were joined by two schools that had been independent since the South Central Conference folded in 1996 (Adrian and Ann Arbor Pioneer). The conference now split into Red and White divisions: Adrian, Bedford, Pioneer, and Saline made up the Red, and the White consisted of Chelsea, Dexter, Lincoln, and Tecumseh. The Southeastern scrapped the divisional format in 2006 in anticipation of another former South Central school joining that next year, Ann Arbor Huron. The conference reintroduced divisions in 2009, the Red being formed by Bedford, Huron, Pioneer, Saline, and two new members, new school Ann Arbor Skyline and Monroe, who left the Michigan Mega Conference. The White Division consisted of Adrian, Chelsea, Dexter, Lincoln, Tecumseh, and another school leaving the Michigan Mega, Ypsilanti.

Ypsilanti had changed their name from Braves to Phoenix in 2010, after phasing out Native American mascots since the 1990s. The school district consolidated with Ypsilanti Willow Run in 2013, resulting in not only another mascot change (Grizzlies), but a color change from Purple and Gold to Black and Gold. Pinckney rejoined the conference in 2017 after leaving the Kensington Lakes Activities Association, while Jackson joined in 2018 coming from the Capital Area Activities Conference. Both schools were put into the White division; however, this has left an imbalance in the number of schools in each division. In 2020 Ypsi moved to the red division. In 2021 Ypsi moved back to the white, and Dexter and Lincoln moved to the red. This has left another imbalance in the divisions, this time with the red having 2 more members than the white.

The 2025-2026 school year will see the conference return to balanced divisions with Lincoln moving from the SEC Red to the SEC White division.

The 2027-2028 school year will see the conference expand to 27 members. This includes the addition of Jackson Northwest from the Interstate 8 Athletic Conference, Dearborn Heights Crestwood from the Western Wayne Athletic Conference, and the following schools from the Kensington Lakes Activities Association: Belleville, Brighton, Canton, Dearborn, Dearborn Fordson, Hartland, Howell, Plymouth, Salem, Wayne Memorial, and Westland John Glenn. Because of this expansion, the SEC will expand from two to four divisions in 2027-2028 as follows:

Blue Division	Red Division	Silver Division	White Division
Brighton	Ann Arbor Huron	Belleville	Adrian
Canton	Ann Arbor Pioneer	Dearborn	Chelsea
Hartland	Ann Arbor Skyline	Dearborn Fordson	Jackson
Howell	Bedford	Dearborn Heights Crestwood	Jackson Northwest
Plymouth	Dexter	Monroe	Pinckney
Salem	Saline	Wayne Memorial	Tecumseh
		Westland John Glenn	Ypsilanti
			Ypsilanti Lincoln
