= Dearborn Center for Math, Science and Technology =

Location
- 22586 Ann Arbor Trail; Dearborn Heights, Michigan 48127; United States
- 42.3406°N 83.2603°W

Information
- Type: Public Specialized Secondary
- Motto: Achieving Excellence
- Established: 2001
- School district: Dearborn Public Schools
- Principal: Amal Alcodray
- Head teacher: Nathan Barnett
- Staff: 7
- Grades: 9-12
- Enrollment: 200
- Campus type: Suburban
- Colors: Blue, Orange, and White
- Newspaper: Nerdschool Times
- Home High Schools: Dearborn High School, Edsel Ford High School, & Fordson High School
- Website: dcmst.dearbornschools.org

Dearborn Center for Math, Science and Technology (DCMST) is a specialized secondary education center with a four-year advanced, research-based, science and math curriculum located in Dearborn Heights, Michigan. The school was founded in 2001, with its first graduating class in 2005. The school is located in the Michael Berry Career Center (MBCC) building. About 75 students are selected each year from the three high schools in the Dearborn City School District. Once in the program, students are committed for four years. In freshman and sophomore years, students attend their three classes at DCMST in the afternoon from 11:15 to 1:55. Juniors and seniors attend in the morning from 7:35 to 10:15. The other three hours are spent at the students' respective home school. DCMST is a member of the NCSSSMST, an alliance of specialized high schools in the United States whose focus is advanced preparatory studies in mathematics, science, and technology. The school is also accredited by the North Central Association (NCA), as all other Dearborn Public Schools are.

== Admission ==
DCMST takes admission applications from any 8th-grade middle school student in the Dearborn City School District to fill all available spaces. These applications include a variety of information, including an essay, teacher recommendations, and past standardized test scores. This application process makes sure that a student's academic ability is not the only information used to decide whether that student will be admitted or not as there are many academically strong students in the district. There are around 180 students who apply for the 78 spaces that are available at DCMST. The available spaces are distributed to a pretty equal number of students that will be attending each of the three 'home' high schools of Dearborn High School, Edsel Ford High School, and Fordson High School.

== Student body ==
There have been upwards of 260 students attending DCMST.

=== Achievement ===
DCMST actively supports students in participation in competitions, scholarship searches, and more. Many students have won recognition at SEFMD, and a few have even made it to the International Science and Engineering Fair put on by the Intel Corporation. One competition that every student enters with a team of other students in their ninth-grade year is the Internet Science and Technology Fair. There have been many teams from DCMST that have won recognition or made it to the finals of the fair, where a website must be submitted on an invention dealing with science and technology. Many other students have submitted essays, research papers, and more to scholarship competitions such as those held by DuPont, Raytheon, and other corporations and organizations. DCMST students are encouraged to go ahead with their research projects in their junior or senior year, even if they do not take the research class. There are many other competitions that DCMST students enter throughout their 4 years at the school.

The Academic Achievement Profile of all Students in the Senior Class of DCMST by Year:

Year	Number of Graduating Students	Average Number of AP Classes Taken by a Student by Graduation	Average Number of Dual Enrollment Credits Granted to a Student	Range of ACT Scores	Average ACT Score	Total Dollar Amount of Scholarships
2006	58	4	6	20 to 30	25.9	929,324
2007	55	4	10	19 to 35	28.7	1,752,000
2008	40	5	12	26-36	32	1,435,050

=== Drop outs ===
During the history of DCMST thus far, there have been students who have chosen to quit DCMST and resign from the spot that they had been awarded during the admissions process. These resignations usually come after the freshman or sophomore year as students realize that he/she believe the program is too rigorous or that he/she does not want to go into a field involving math, science, and technology specifically.

== School improvement ==
During the 2006–2007 school year, DCMST staff and teachers pushed students to use credible sources and proper citation formats when writing research papers. The teachers pushed to get students to understand and know the APA, MLA, and sometimes AMA formats for research papers/projects and other assignments. The teachers also attempted to curtail Wikipedia as a credible source of information.
