= Western Wayne Athletic Conference =

The Western Wayne Athletic Conference (WWAC), is a high school sports conference located in Wayne County, Michigan. It was formed in 2009.

== Formation and Expansion ==
The WWAC was formed by 11 of the teams of the former Michigan Mega Conference after it disbanded in 2009. The league began play that same year. The league expanded in 2013 with the additions of Clarenceville, and until summer 2013, Inkster. Many rivalries from the Mega were carried over to the WWAC, including the rivalries from Dearborn and Dearborn Heights. Annual crossover games had also maintained the football rivalry between Garden City and Edsel Ford, until 2015, when division realignment forced the teams to put the game on hiatus.

In 2018, Belleville, Dearborn and Fordson all left the WWAC to join the Kensington Lakes Activities Association, while Edsel Ford left the same year in favor of joining the Downriver League. These losses forced the WWAC to get rid of the Red and Blue divisions and have all the remaining WWAC members play under the same division. The next year, in 2019, Clarenceville left the WWAC in favor of joining the Michigan Independent Athletic Conference, and in exchange, Melvindale High was brought on from the Downriver League.

== Member schools ==
=== Current members ===
School	Nickname	Location	Joined	Previous Conference
Dearborn Heights Annapolis	Cougars	Dearborn Heights	2009	Michigan Mega Conference
Dearborn Heights Robichaud	Bulldogs	Dearborn Heights	2009	Michigan Mega Conference
Melvindale	Cardinals	Melvindale	2019	Downriver League
Redford Thurston	Eagles	Redford Township	2009	Michigan Mega Conference
Redford Union	Panthers	Redford Township	2009	Michigan Mega Conference
Romulus	Eagles	Romulus	2009	Michigan Mega Conference
Garden City	Cougars	Garden City	2009	Michigan Mega Conference

=== Former members ===
School	Nickname	Location	Joined	Previous Conference	Left	Successive Conference
Inkster	Vikings	Inkster	2013	Independent	2013	None (school shut down)*
Belleville	Tigers	Belleville	2009	Michigan Mega Conference	2018	Kensington Lakes Activities Association
Dearborn	Pioneers	Dearborn	2009	Michigan Mega Conference	2018	Kensington Lakes Activities Association
Dearborn Fordson	Tractors	Dearborn	2009	Michigan Mega Conference	2018	Kensington Lakes Activities Association
Dearborn Edsel Ford	Thunderbirds	Dearborn	2009	Michigan Mega Conference	2018	Downriver League
Livonia Clarenceville	Trojans	Livonia	2013	Independent	2019	Michigan Independent Athletic Conference
Dearborn Heights Crestwood	Chargers	Dearborn Heights	2009	Michigan Mega Conference	2026	Kensington Lakes Activities Association

*Inkster joined the WWAC during the 2012–13 school year and played spring sports. However, before Inkster could start their first full season in the WWAC, their school district closed. This resulted in the high school closing which gave Inkster no choice but to withdraw from the conference.

== Sports Supported ==
The WWAC supports Football, Basketball, Golf, Swimming, Cross-Country, Track, Soccer, Wrestling, Baseball, Softball, Tennis, Volleyball, and Bowling.

== Athletic History ==
WWAC Champions Football
Rank	School	Years	Total
1	Fordson	09, 11-14, 16	6
2	Thurston	09-11, 19	4
3	Dearborn	10, 15, 16	3
3	Belleville	13, 15, 17	3
3	Robichaud	12, 14, 19	3
3	Union	21, 22, 23	3
6	Crestwood	18, 20	2
6	Romulus	15, 17	2
7
7	Edsel Ford	15	1
7	Clarenceville	13	1
