= Fadwa Obeid =

Lebanese-American singer

- Fadwa Obeid, from the 1954 yearbook of Fordson High School
- Born: Fay Fadwa Abed; March 3, 1935; Los Angeles, California
- Died: January 14, 2022 (aged 86); Michigan
- Other names: Fadwa Abed, Fadwa Abeid, Fawda Abed, Fadwa Mansour
- Occupation: Singer

Fadwa Obeid (March 3, 1935 – January 14, 2022), also written as Fadwa Abed or Fadwa Abeid, was a Lebanese singer.

== Early life and education ==
Fay Fadwa Abed was born in Los Angeles County, the daughter of Joseph Abed and Sadie Alhandy Abed. Her father was a confectioner; she spent her childhood in Haret Hreik, near Beirut, where she learned Arabic and French at a convent school. She returned to the United States with her American-born mother at age 11, and graduated from Fordson High School in Dearborn, Michigan in 1954. She attended classes at Henry Ford College, Wayne State University, and the University of Michigan–Dearborn.

== Career ==
Obeid began singing for audiences in her teens, starting at restaurants, then charity events, church anniversaries, community festivals, and national conventions. Her mother accompanied her in her travels. In 1953, she sang Arabic-language songs for the United Nations Association of Greater Chicago, accompanied by Jalil Azzouz and his orchestra. In 1954, she made several recordings on the Al-Chark label, and endorsed a Brooklyn restaurant in print advertisements. In 1956, she sang at the annual convention of the Federation of Islamic Associations. In 1959 she sang at the annual meeting of the Organization of Arab Students in the U.S.A. She also performed in Canadian cities with Syrian and Lebanese communities. "She has the singing and dramatic ability to keep you on the edge of your seat or take you along in a dreamy passionate flight," said one reporter in 1959.

Obeid became popular in the Middle East as well. She moved to Beirut, making further recordings on Lebanese labels and appearing on television and in movies. She retired from singing and returned to the United States when the Lebanese Civil War made it difficult to continue her career from Beirut. She briefly returned to the stage in the 1990s, performing in Lebanon, Jordan, and Egypt, but health issues ended this second phase of her career.

== Personal life and legacy ==
Obeid was rumored to be engaged to marry in 1960. She later married Tahir Monsour, an engineer in the automotive industry. Her husband died in 2018. She died in 2022, at the age of 86, in Michigan. A track by Obeid appeared on an archival compilation, Come On Honey: Arab-American Women ca. 1943-58 from Independent 78rpm Discs, released by Canary Records.
