= Gary Lowe =

American football player (1934–2017)

- Lowe in 1963

No. 40, 43
- Positions: Defensive back, halfback

Personal information
- Born: May 4, 1934; Trenton, Michigan, U.S.
- Died: October 8, 2017 (aged 83); Troy, Michigan, U.S.
- Listed height: 5 ft 11 in (1.80 m)
- Listed weight: 196 lb (89 kg)

Career information
- High school: Trenton
- College: Michigan State
- NFL draft: 1956: 5th round, 59th overall pick

Career history
- Washington Redskins (1956–1957); Detroit Lions (1957–1964); Minnesota Vikings (1965)*
- * Offseason or practice squad member only

Awards and highlights
- NFL Champion (1957)

Career NFL statistics
- Interceptions: 20
- Safeties: 1
- Fumble recoveries: 11
- Stats at Pro Football Reference

Gary Richard Lowe (May 4, 1934 - October 8, 2017) was an American professional football defensive back. He played in the National Football League (NFL) for the Washington Redskins and the Detroit Lions. He played college football at Michigan State University and was drafted in the fifth round of the 1956 NFL draft.

== Early life ==
Gary Lowe was born May 4, 1934, in Trenton, Michigan, located 19 miles south of Detroit. He attended Trenton High School, where he was a star playing football and basketball, helping to lead the school to a Detroit Suburban "B" Conference basketball title in 1950–51. On the gridiron the senior was selected a first-team back on the Associated Press's Michigan Class B All-State Team at the end of the 1951 season.

== College career ==
Lowe stayed in state to go to college, attending Michigan State College (MSC) in East Lansing. After spending the 1952 season on the freshman football team, Lowe was promoted to the varsity in the fall of 1953, where he was regarded as a top prospect by head coach Biggie Munn and his staff. A summertime knee injury had fallen the team's anticipated starting tailback, Bernie Raterink, for the season, opening a spot for Lowe. "We will move Gary Lowe into the spot," said backfield coach Steve Sebo. "He's a sophomore, but he can go and I think he will learn the assignment quickly."

Lowe spent the 1953 season on the Spartans as a reserve, playing behind star left halfback Leroy Bolden. Lowe was a key substitute, named by Coach Munn to the team's 38-man traveling squad. Michigan State would lose only once on the year, finishing with a #3 national ranking and earning a trip to the 1954 Rose Bowl.

Lowe's promotion to the MSC varsity in 1953 coincided with a return to the one-platoon system in college football — in which substitution meant loss of a player for the duration of the quarter, so eleven players stayed on the field in both offensive and defensive capacities. Lowe consequently saw action not only as an offensive halfback but as a defensive back as well. It was in this latter capacity that he particularly shined.

== Professional career ==
A Detroit resident, during the off-season he worked for the Autolite division of the Ford Motor Company.

== Death and legacy ==
Lowe died on October 8, 2017, at the age of 83.
