= Downriver League =

The Downriver League is an athletic conference for high schools in Michigan. It was formed in 2009 after the dissolution of the Michigan Mega Conference by schools in the "Downriver" area of Metro Detroit. In 2018, Dearborn Edsel Ford was brought into the league to the fill the opening left by Taylor Kennedy after it closed and consolidated with Taylor Truman to make Taylor High. In 2019, Melvindale left to join the Western Wayne Athletic Conference.

== Member schools ==
Team	Location	Enrollment	Class	Joined	Previous Conference
Allen Park Jaguars	Allen Park	1099	A	2009	Michigan Mega Conference
Dearborn Edsel Ford Thunderbirds	Dearborn	1657	A	2018	Western Wayne Athletic Conference
Gibraltar Carlson Marauders	Gibraltar	1123	A	2009	Michigan Mega Conference
Lincoln Park Railsplitters	Lincoln Park	1362	A	2009	Michigan Mega Conference
Southgate Anderson Titans	Southgate	1030	A	2009	Michigan Mega Conference
Taylor Griffins	Taylor	1678	A	2018	None (school first established)
Trenton Trojans	Trenton	886	A	2009	Michigan Mega Conference
Woodhaven Warriors	Brownstown Township	1614	A	2009	Michigan Mega Conference
Wyandotte Roosevelt Bears	Wyandotte	1295	A	2009	Michigan Mega Conference

== Football ==
This list goes through the 2026 season.

#	Team	DRL Championships
1	Gibraltar Carlson (7)	18, 2021-26
2	Woodhaven (6)	2012, 2014, 2018–21
3	Wyandotte Roosevelt (6)	2010-2013, 2017, 2020
4	Allen Park (4)	2015, 2016, 2020–21
5	Trenton	2015, 2022
6	Taylor Truman	2012
7	Melvindale	2009
