= Southeastern Conference (disambiguation) =

The Southeastern Conference is an American college athletic conference whose member institutions are located primarily in the Southern part of the United States.

Southeastern or Southeast Conference may also refer to:

- Southeast Conference (Iowa), American high school athletic conference in Iowa
- Southeast Conference (Wisconsin), American high school athletic conference in Wisconsin
- Southeast Conference, United Church of Christ, American regional body of the United Church of Christ
- Southeastern Conference (MHSAA), American high school athletic conference in Michigan
- Mission Conference, American junior college athletic conference in California, formed in 1968 as the "Southeastern Conference"
