= Gerry Mayhew (ice hockey) =

American ice hockey player (born 1992)

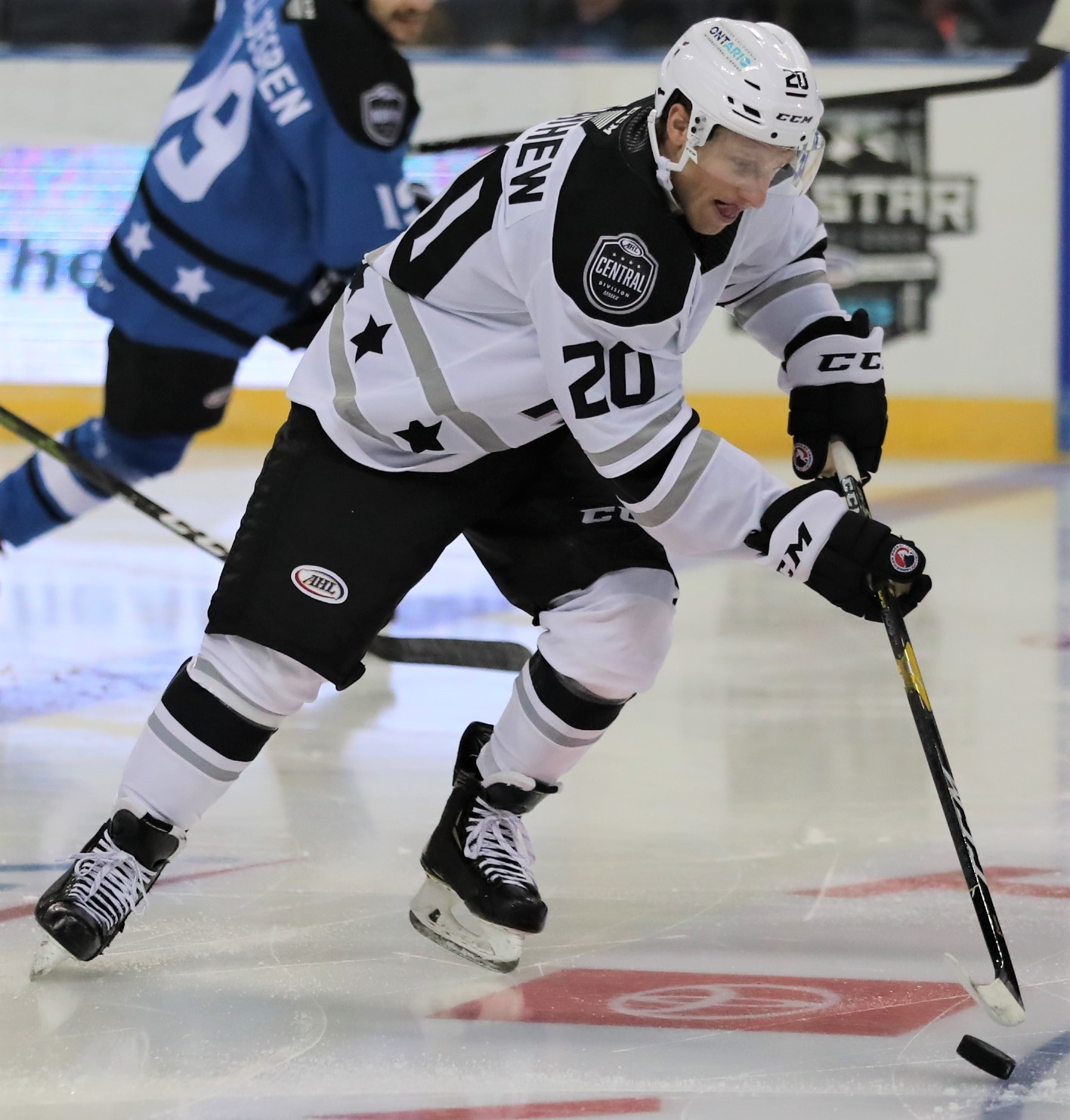
- Mayhew at the 2020 AHL All-Star Game
- Born: December 31, 1992 (age 33) Wyandotte, Michigan, U.S.
- Height: 5 ft 9 in (175 cm)
- Weight: 166 lb (75 kg; 11 st 12 lb)
- Position: Forward
- Shoots: Right
- AHL team Former teams: Cleveland Monsters; Minnesota Wild; Philadelphia Flyers; Anaheim Ducks
- NHL draft: Undrafted
- Playing career: 2017–present

Gerald Alfano Mayhew (born December 31, 1992) is an American professional ice hockey winger. He currently plays for the Cleveland Monsters in the American Hockey League (AHL).

== Early life ==
Mayhew was born on December 31, 1992, in Wyandotte, Michigan, to Gerald and Catherine Mayhew. He grew up about 20 minutes outside of Detroit and Joe Louis Arena, and would frequently attend Detroit Red Wings games during his childhood. Mayhew's favorite ice hockey players were Steve Yzerman and Brett Hull. Unlike many youth hockey players in Michigan, Mayhew declined the opportunity to play minor ice hockey for the Little Caesars organization, preferring instead to focus on his school team. He attended Roosevelt High School in Wyandotte, leading its ice hockey team to a state championship in 2011. That year, he scored 48 goals and 57 assists and was crowned Michigan's "Mr. Hockey", an award given to the top boys' ice hockey player in the state.

== Playing career ==
Mayhew attended high school at Theodore Roosevelt High School (Michigan) where he won the 2011 Michigan High School Athletic Association ice hockey state championship. Undrafted, Mayhew would play four years of university hockey with the Ferris State Bulldogs of the Western Collegiate Hockey Association before turning professional by signing an amateur tryout agreement with the Iowa Wild of the American Hockey League on March 9, 2017. Mayhew played the remainder of the 2016–17 season with the Wild, scoring six goals and seven points in 17 appearances with the club before being inked to an AHL contract for the following season. After being re-signed for another season, Mayhew put up 60 points in 71 games, and was rewarded with a two-year, two-way contract by the Minnesota Wild, Iowa's National Hockey League affiliate, on May 10, 2019.

After putting up six points in the first four games of the 2019–20 season, Mayhew was called up by the Wild on October 13. He made his NHL debut on October 15, scoring a goal in a 4–2 loss against the Toronto Maple Leafs.

Leaving the Wild organization after five seasons, Mayhew was signed as a free agent to a one-year, two-way $800,000 contract with the Philadelphia Flyers on July 28, 2021. Starting the 2021–22 season with AHL affiliate, the Lehigh Valley Phantoms, Mayhew collected 9 goals in 24 games. Recalled to the NHL, Mayhew featured in 25 games for the struggling Flyers, recording a career best 6 goals, before he was claimed off waivers by the Anaheim Ducks on March 20, 2022.

On July 15, 2022, Mayhew was signed as a free agent to a one-year, two-way contract with the Florida Panthers. He remained in the Panthers organization for two seasons, playing exclusively with AHL affiliate, the Charlotte Checkers.

As a free agent leading into the 2024–25 season, Mayhew was belatedly signed to a one-year AHL contract with the Rockford IceHogs, affiliate to the Chicago Blackhawks, on October 27, 2024. He signed a contract to return to the Iowa Wild for the 2025–26 season.

On November 16, 2026, Mayhew was traded to the Henderson Silver Knights in exchange for future considerations.

On November 20, 2026, Mayhew was traded to the Cleveland Monsters in exchange for future considerations.

== Career statistics ==
			Regular season					Playoffs
Season	Team	League	GP	G	A	Pts	PIM	GP	G	A	Pts	PIM
2011–12	Cedar Rapids RoughRiders	USHL	58	20	13	33	38	2	1	0	1	2
2012–13	Cedar Rapids RoughRiders	USHL	59	16	28	44	25	—	—	—	—	—
2013–14	Ferris State Bulldogs	WCHA	36	8	12	20	14	—	—	—	—	—
2014–15	Ferris State Bulldogs	WCHA	40	11	12	23	32	—	—	—	—	—
2015–16	Ferris State Bulldogs	WCHA	41	16	25	41	59	—	—	—	—	—
2016–17	Ferris State Bulldogs	WCHA	33	17	18	35	61	—	—	—	—	—
2016–17	Iowa Wild	AHL	17	6	1	7	4	—	—	—	—	—
2017–18	Iowa Wild	AHL	72	16	16	32	36	—	—	—	—	—
2018–19	Iowa Wild	AHL	71	27	33	60	51	11	9	2	11	20
2019–20	Iowa Wild	AHL	49	39	22	61	68	—	—	—	—	—
2019–20	Minnesota Wild	NHL	13	2	0	2	2	—	—	—	—	—
2020–21	Minnesota Wild	NHL	4	0	1	1	0	—	—	—	—	—
2020–21	Iowa Wild	AHL	19	9	9	18	19	—	—	—	—	—
2021–22	Lehigh Valley Phantoms	AHL	24	9	7	16	20	—	—	—	—	—
2021–22	Philadelphia Flyers	NHL	25	6	0	6	10	—	—	—	—	—
2021–22	Anaheim Ducks	NHL	15	5	1	6	8	—	—	—	—	—
2022–23	Charlotte Checkers	AHL	69	24	20	44	68	5	0	0	0	0
2023–24	Charlotte Checkers	AHL	68	19	18	37	40	3	1	1	2	4
2024–25	Rockford IceHogs	AHL	56	14	21	35	32	7	3	1	4	6
2025–26	Iowa Wild	AHL	60	22	20	42	32	—	—	—	—	—
2026–27	Iowa Wild	AHL	17	2	6	8	10	—	—	—	—	—
2026–27	Henderson Silver Knights	AHL	0	0	0	0	0	—	—	—	—	—
2026–27	Cleveland Monsters	AHL	1	0	0	0	2	—	—	—	—	—
NHL totals			57	13	2	15	20	—	—	—	—	—

== Awards and honors ==
Awards	Year
High school (North America)
MHSAA State Championship	2011
College
WCHA All-Tournament Team	2014, 2016
WHCA Second All-Star Team	2016
WCHA First All-Star Team	2017
AHL
All-Star Game	2020
Les Cunningham Award	2020
Second All-Star Team	2020
Willie Marshall Award	2020
