= Gwen Frostic =

American artist

- Born: Sara Gwendolen Frostic; 26 April 1906; Sandusky, Michigan, U.S.
- Died: 25 April 2001 (aged 94); Benzonia, Michigan, U.S.
- Resting place: Benzonia Township Cemetery
- Education: Eastern Michigan University; Western Michigan University
- Known for: Printing, drawing, woodworking, carving, writing

Gwen Frostic (April 26, 1906 – April 25, 2001) born as Sara Gwendolen Frostic, was an American artist, entrepreneur, author, and Michigan Women's Hall of Fame inductee. A lifelong resident of Michigan, Frostic is known for her naturalist, Linocut block print artwork, created using Original Heidelberg Platten presses.

== Early life and education ==
Gwen Frostic was born April 26, 1906, in Sandusky, Michigan, to Sara (née Anderson) and Fred W. Frostic. Her parents had both been trained as teachers in Ypsilanti, Michigan. At the time of Frostic's birth, Fred was serving as school principal. One of seven children, Frostic had an older brother, Bill, and five younger siblings. Although precocious and already walking, at 8 months old, Frostic suffered a high fever from an unknown illness which then left her with lifelong symptoms similar to cerebral palsy. Despite physical difficulties including a limp and weak hands, Frostic showed an early interest in and aptitude for art. Her mother was a strong advocate for her involvement in diverse activities despite her disabilities. Gwen lived with her family in Croswell, then St. Charles, before the family moved to Ann Arbor in 1917 while Fred earned a bachelor's degree at the University of Michigan. In 1918, the family settled in Wyandotte when Fred became the Superintendent of Wyandotte Public Schools.

In June 1924 Frostic graduated from Theodore Roosevelt High School in Wyandotte, where she had completed several courses in mechanical drawing and was known for using a band saw to create event posters for her school.

== Career ==
Frostic went on to study art education at Eastern Michigan University, where she joined the Alpha Sigma Tau sorority and earned her teacher's certificate. In 1926, she transferred to Western Michigan University where, in an art class, she carved her first linoleum block artwork. Frostic left Western Michigan University (WMU), just short of completing her degree, in 1927. WMU’s School of Art is named for Frostic, who donated millions to the university.

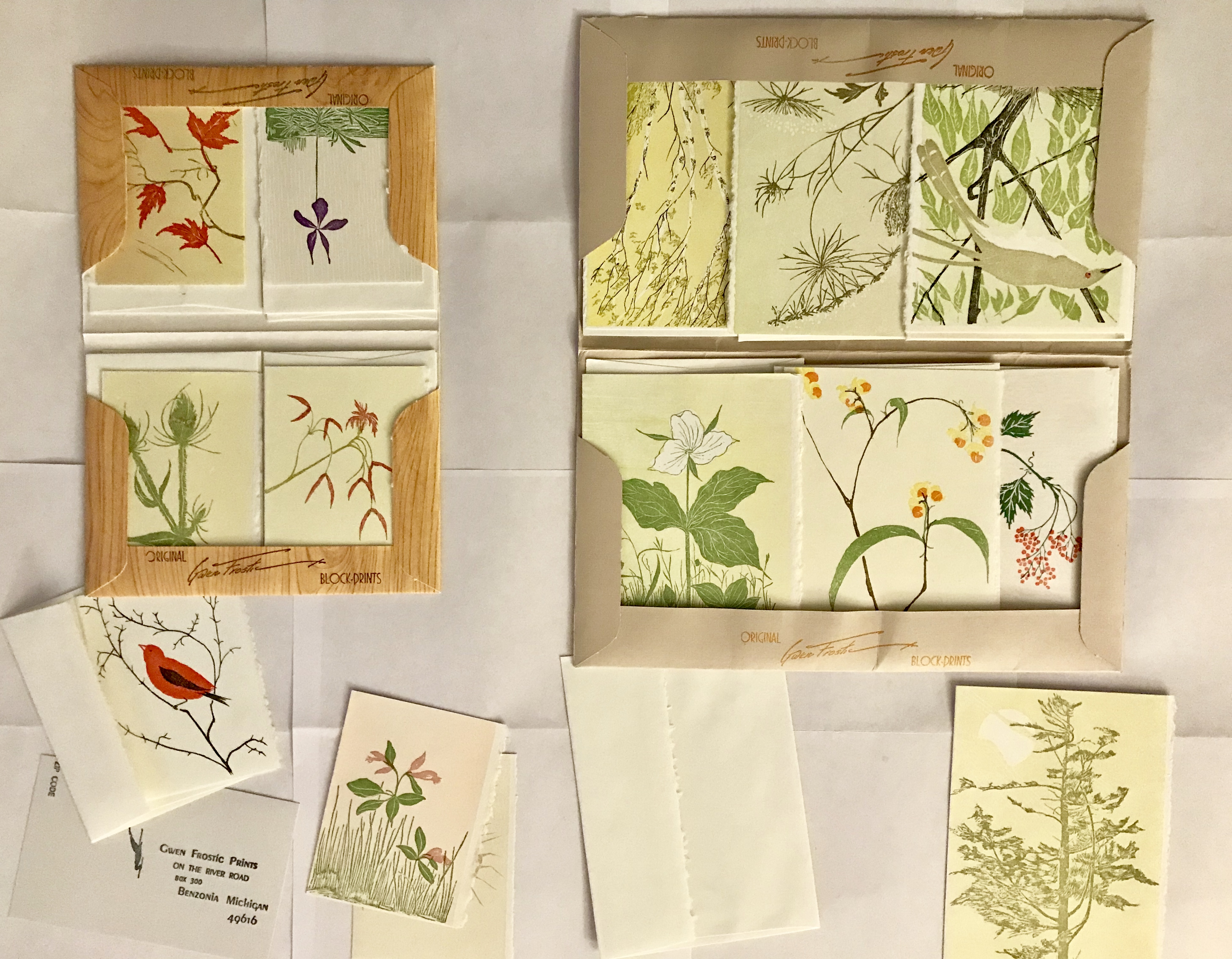
greeting cards by artist Gwen Frostic

Frostic set up a metals studio in the family home and started a business, Metalcraft, where she produced objects and was commissioned to make two copper vases for the wife of Henry Ford, Clara Bryant Ford. In 1929, Frostic worked as a summer camp counselor at Osoha of the Dunes, in Frankfort, Michigan.

She continued her artistic endeavors in metal and plastic, while teaching in Dearborn and offering metals courses at the YMCA in Detroit. As the supplies of metal began to dry up due to World War II, Frostic turned to more readily available materials and began printmaking, using the Linocut technique of carving linoleum blocks. Due to her exploration with plastic, she was also commissioned to make a piece for the 1939 New York World's Fair.

During World War II, Frostic worked full-time, six days a week, as a tool and die draftsperson in the Willow Run bomber plant of Ford Motor Company where she became skilled in production.

After the war, Frostic started her own production printing company in Wyandotte, known as Presscraft Papers, by turning her linoleum block carvings into stationery goods and prints through the use of Heidelberg printing presses. In the early 1950s, she shifted her attention farther North and opened up a summer shop selling her prints, books, and other items in the historic tourist town of Frankfort on Lake Michigan. Her Frankfort shop, located directly in the town, was quite successful and three years later she moved there permanently to operate her business year round.

In 1960 she bought 40 acres (160,000 m^{2}) of land in Benzonia with the intention of moving herself and her shop further inland into the forest. Her new property was located in a rural wooded riparian area on the Betsie River, initially accessed only by dirt roads. Frostic oversaw the construction of the print shop and dwelling, building it in relation to the woodlands. She conceived of a number of naturalistic and artistic elements including large stone boulders and a natural spring flowing inside the structure and an area with a green sod roof. On April 26, 1964, her new shop opened for business in the completed building of her own design. From an area of the shop, the Heidelberg presses could be observed from above, rhythmically printing away on the various paper products. Her artwork frequently depicted the natural world surrounding her shop: trees, plants, birds, mushrooms, flowers, berries, and animals. She incrementally grew her property into a 285-acre wildlife sanctuary.

Her business grew and prospered steadily over the years. Frostic was recognized as a successful entrepreneur at a time when few women were celebrated for this. The Detroit Free Press reported that she had 34 employees working in her printing business in 1985.

Several of Frostic's prints are in the collection of the Detroit Institute of Arts. She was a long time member of the Northwest Michigan Artists and Craftsmen.

Frostic remained actively involved creating art and working in her business well into her nineties. She lived at the Benzonia property until her death in 2001 a day before her 95th birthday. Much earlier, in 1960, Frostic was rumored to be a millionaire from her business, but as she lived a simple, modest life, this was unconfirmed until the public announcement that she had left $13 million to her alma mater, Western Michigan University.

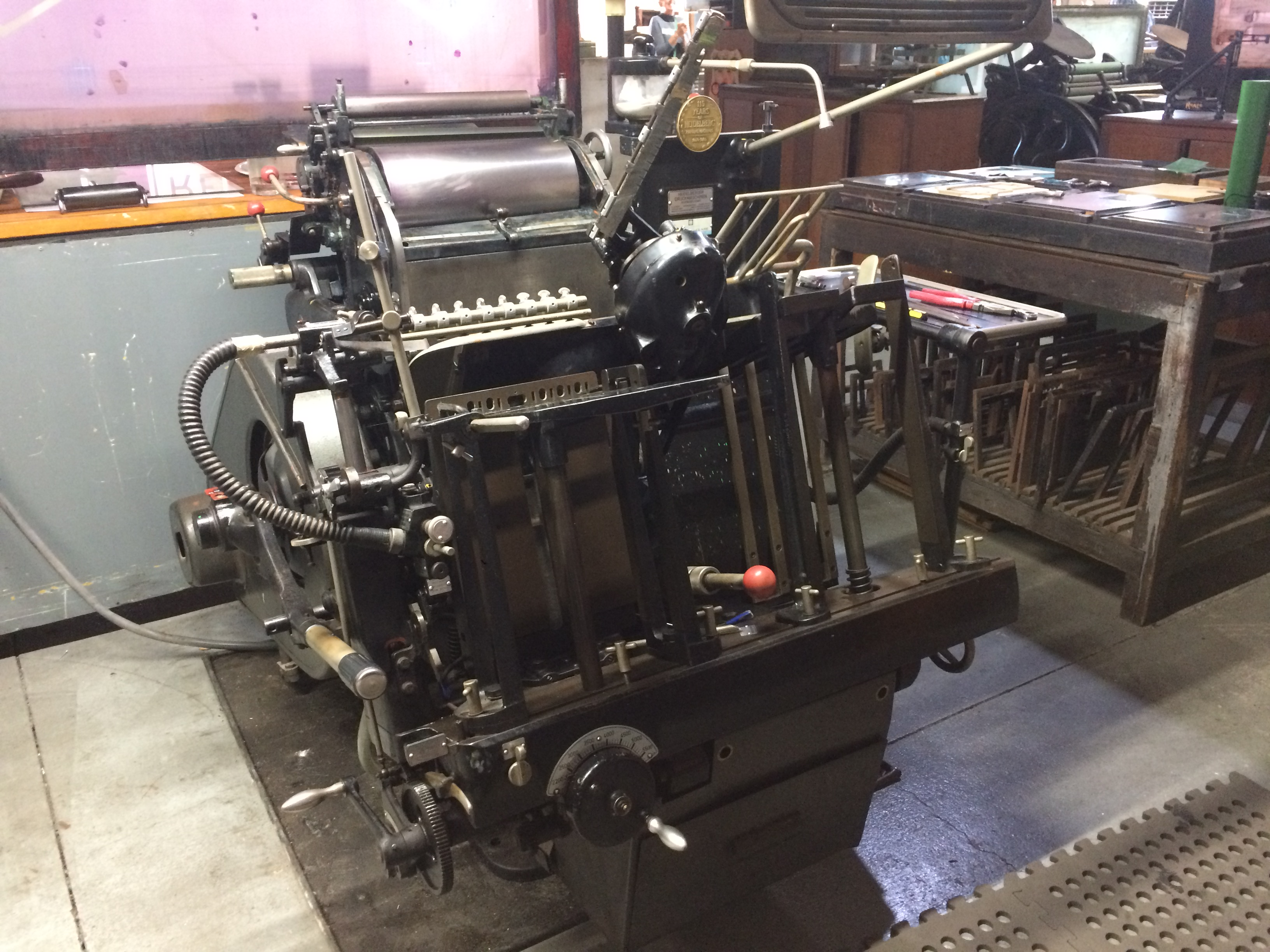
Heidelberg press similar to those used at the Gwen Frostic studio

Frostic's shop, Presscraft Papers, remains open in the original building (under new ownership) and continues to produce prints from her original linoleum block cuts. As of 2018, her nephew, Bill Frostic, was listed as the printing supervisor and has been running the presses for over 50 years. All 12 of the original Heidelberg presses remain in operation at the studio, and visitors can watch them in action during the week. Frostic carved over 2,300 blocks, which can be seen on the shelves of the studio. The current owners of Presscraft Papers raised funds and replaced a section of the roof structure that was in need of repairs.

An award-winning picture book biography about Frostic entitled “Nature’s Friend: The Gwen Frostic Story” by Lindsey McDivitt was published by Sleeping Bear Press in 2018. It was named a 2019 Michigan Notable Book by the Library of Michigan.

== Awards ==
Frostic was granted several honorary doctorates from Alma College, Eastern Michigan University, Western Michigan University, Michigan State University, and Ferris State University. In 1978, Governor William Milliken declared May 23 as Gwen Frostic Day in Michigan. In 1986 she was inducted into the Michigan Women's Hall of Fame.

The Michigan Reading Association presents the Gwen Frostic Award to notable authors and illustrators who have impacted fostering literacy.

In 1998, the Frederik Meijer Gardens and Sculpture Park in Grand Rapids, Michigan, named an area of the park, with many indigenous plants and animals, the Gwen Frostic Woodland Shade Garden in her honor.

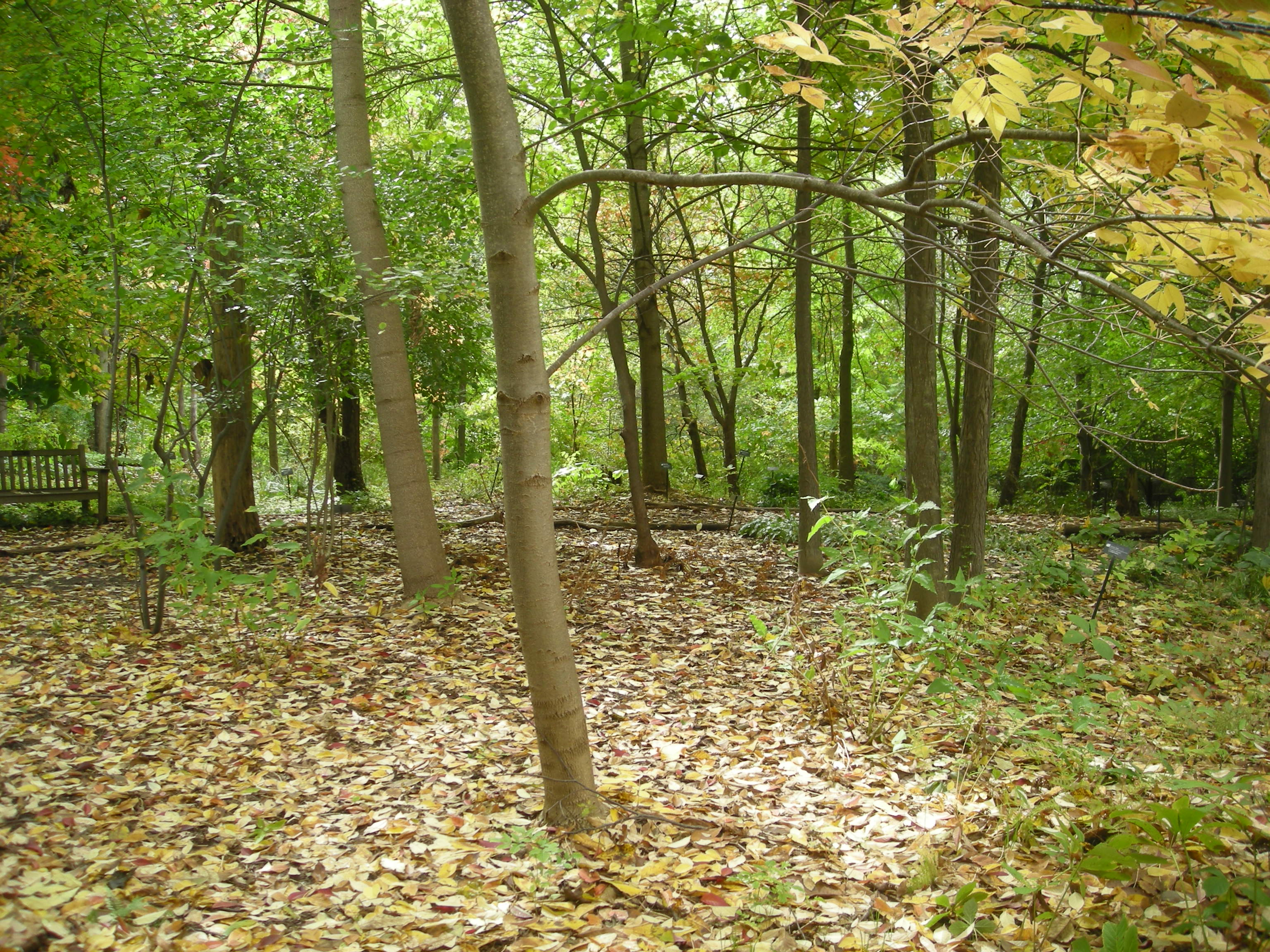
The Gwen Frostic Woodland Shade Garden at the Meijer Sculpture Park, 2014

The Gwen Frostic School of Art at Western Michigan University was named in her honor in 2007, after her $13 million bequest to the University in 2001, the largest single gift in the school's history. While given as an unrestricted bequest, the funds have primarily been used for scholarships for students, and for the benefit of the arts and creative writing departments in particular, in respect of her lifelong pursuits.

In 2021, her hillside studio and personal residence, "which embodies her passion for nature" that was centered in Northern Michigan, was named to the National Register of Historic Places.

== Bibliography ==
- My Michigan (1957)
- A Walk With Me (1958)
- These Things Are Ours (1960)
- To Those Who See (1965)
- Wing-borne (1967)
- Wisps of Mist (1969)
- A Place on Earth (1967)
- Beyond Time (1971)
- Contemplate (1973)
- The Enduring Cosmos (1976)
- Interlochen: An Unfinished Symphony (1977)
- The Infinite Destiny (1978)
- The Evolving Omnity (1981)
- The Caprice Immensity (1983)
- Multiversality (1985)
- Heuristic (1987)
- Chaotic Harmony (1989)
- Abysmal-Acumen (1991)
- Aggrandize (1993)
- Synthesis (1995)
- Ruminate (1997)
- Lilies of the Fields (1999)
