= WHFR =

Coordinates: 42.324°N 83.236°W

- Dearborn, Michigan; United States
- Broadcast area: Metro Detroit
- Frequency: 89.3 MHz

Programming
- Format: Variety, college and classical

Ownership
- Owner: Henry Ford College

History
- First air date: December 20, 1985
- Call sign meaning: Henry Ford College Radio

Technical information
- Licensing authority: FCC
- Class: A
- ERP: 270 watts
- HAAT: 30 meters (98 ft)

Links
- Public license information: Public file; LMS
- Website: whfr.fm

WHFR (89.3 FM) is a student-run college radio station owned by Henry Ford College in Dearborn, Michigan. The station is student-staffed and faculty-guided. Its studios are in the college's Student Center. The transmitter is also located on the campus, off Evergreen Road.

== Programming ==
WHFR airs a variety format of music seldom played by Detroit area radio stations, including alternative/modern rock, big bands, urban gospel, Americana, folk, blues, hip hop, jazz, space rock, urban rock, and world music. Most shows highlight new releases, independent labels, and local artists. Through a satellite-delivered service known as "Classical 24," the station carries classical music during late nights and early mornings. The station also produces a weekly public affairs program.

== History ==
In 1962, WHFR began as a student radio club with only a double-closet-sized room for operating a public address system to the dining room, providing a variety of music and campus announcements during weekday hours. However, the club's mission since its start was to start a real broadcast station, serving the unique music and information needs of the community, as well as the students at HFCC.

By 1978, the HFCC administration, recognizing the spirit and seeing the dedication, applied for an FM broadcast license from the Federal Communications Commission. The license was granted in 1979, but the preparations necessary to broadcast (construction, equipment, staffing, and budget) took until 1985 to get worked out, when the station went on the air.

Beginning with only six hours a day/six days a week, with all shows prerecorded, WHFR grew steadily as it proved itself and attracted more volunteers, first going "live" in 1987 (for three hours a week). In 1988, with a schedule of 12 hours a day, the WHFR staff was stretched thin and moved all of its equipment and music library out of the Student Center and into the new HFCC Fine Arts Center. Since 1997, the station has achieved a 24/7 broadcasting schedule, with the help of over 60 student and alumni volunteers.

WHFR's broadcast guide is available every day on their website and features college alternative including indie rock, punk, blues, metal, jazz, classical, opera, choral music, world music, Americana/folk, techno, grrl groups and video game soundtracks. Most shows fit a 2-hour time slot, and the format changes for each show.

== See also ==
- Campus radio
- List of college radio stations in the United States
