= Dearborn Public Schools =

School district in Michigan

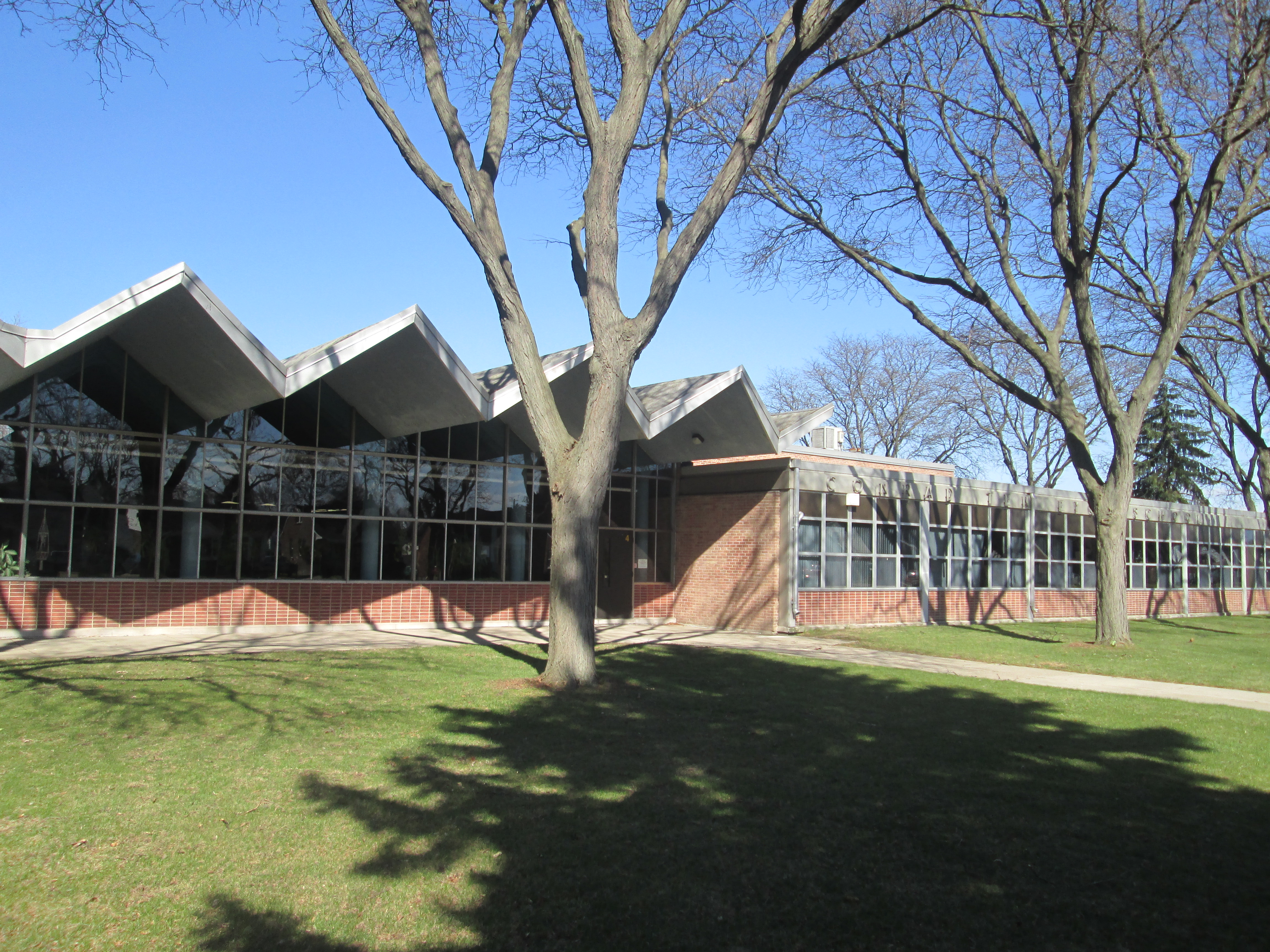
- Ten Eyck Administration Building

Address
- 18700 Audette Street Dearborn, Wayne County, Michigan, 48124; United States

District information
- Grades: PreKindergarten–12
- Superintendent: Mike Esseily
- Schools: 37
- Budget: $403,718,000 2022–2023 expenditures
- NCES District ID: 2611600

Students and staff
- Students: 19,262 (2024–2025)
- Teachers: 1,301.69 (on an FTE basis) (2024–2025)
- Staff: 2,629.32 FTE (2024–2025)
- Student–teacher ratio: 14.8 (2024–2025)

Other information
- Website: dearbornschools.org

Dearborn Public Schools, also known as Dearborn City School District, is a public school district in Metro Detroit, Michigan. It includes most of the city of Dearborn, Michigan and a small portion of Dearborn Heights.

== History ==
1893 saw the construction of a new school in downtown Dearborn. A few years later, a high school was established in one room of the school, and the first student graduated in 1897. By 1917, the school campus had three buildings.

A new Dearborn High School opened in 1926. The architect was George D. Mason. The current school opened in 1957, and the 1926 building became a middle school before ultimately closing.

Springwells High School was established in 1922. When it moved to a new building in 1928, it was renamed Fordson High School. The sprawling Collegiate Gothic structure was noted for its magnificence. Fordson was initially part of a separate district. Its district merged with Dearborn's in 1944.

In September 1955, Edsel Ford High School opened. Designed by Eberle M. Smith and Associates, the school featured an innovative concrete shell forming the roofs of the gymnasiums and swimming pool.

The district has a high percentage of Muslim students, and Muslim community has struggled for their culture and beliefs to be accommodated by the district. In 1995, with an estimated Muslim enrollment of 39 percent, the district was reviewing its curriculum to integrate more Middle Eastern history and culture. As of 2001, some schools were ninety percent or more Muslim, and the Muslim community was demanding that the district accommodate their religious dietary laws, called Halal laws. Since the early 1980s, Dearborn district schools have vegetarian meals as alternative to non-Halal meals. As of 2010 some schools used discretionary funds to offer Halal meals, but most schools did not offer Halal meals since they cannot get affordable prices from distributors.

In 2013 a group of students and parents suggested that the high schools ought to have later starting times.

In the fall of 2021, the district moved start times later for all students. The district runs a three-tier busing system meaning a single bus may pick up and deliver high school, middle school and then elementary school students.

In 2026, Mike Esseily, former teacher and assistant principal within the district became the new superintendent. He is the first Arab and the first Muslim to serve as the superintendent in the district.

The district is proposing a $1.5 billion construction bond issue, to be voted on in November 2026, that would replace some schools and renovate some existing ones.

== Demographics ==
The community includes a large Arab American population, and Arabic is the most common second language in the district after English. From 2000 to 2010, during a time of growth in the Arab American community, the enrollment of DPS increased from 17,000 to 18,500. This occurred even though the number of households in Dearborn declined during the same period.

In a thirty-year period ending sometime prior to 2010 the district and Detroit Public Schools both developed policies to accommodate Arab and Muslim students in collaboration with administrators, parents, teachers, and students. Policies adopted by the districts included observances of Muslim holidays, Arabic-language programs, policies concerning prayer, and rules regarding modesty of girls and women in physical education and sports.

As of 2016 almost 66% of the district's students were Arab American. As of 2016 the poorest 25% of the district's students performed far above national averages in academic performance.

About 70 percent of the families in the district are low-income as of 2021. Dearborn Public Schools offers free school lunch and breakfast to most of its kindergarten through 12th grade students through the Community Eligibility Program of the National School Lunch Program.

== Academic performance ==
Five schools in the district received National Blue Ribbon Schools Awards from the U.S. Department of Education from 2017 through 2021, including Iris Becker Elementary in 2017, STEM Middle School in 2018, Charles A. Lindbergh Elementary in 2019, and Haigh Elementary and Henry Ford Early College in 2021.

== Early college programs ==
Dearborn Public Schools offers four early college programs through a partnership with Henry Ford College. All four programs allow students to attend school for five years to complete both a high school diploma and some college, potentially earning an associate degree, trade certification or college credits to apply toward a bachelor's degree.

== Controversies ==
In 1999 a group of Arab parents voted down a 1999 bond because they wanted one with more substantial funds. Instead of that $50 million bond, the parents approved of a $150 million around 2001.

Extensive bi-lingual programs in the district (where some schools have 90% Arabic-origin student populations) have caused concern with the Wayne County Regional Education Service Agency issuing a report suggesting banning Arabic except where absolutely necessary. State budget cuts in 2011 were expected to heavily impact special programs including bi-lingual education. In 2012 the U.S. Department of Justice asked the district to provide more information in immigrant languages to parents of students who had difficulty with English.

In 2022 there were political controversies in the district regarding LGBTQ materials in schools. In 2022, there were protests that advocated for removing certain books and protests that advocated against districts removing such books. The district chose to discontinue holding seven titles. Much of the impetus against LGBTQ books was driven by conservative Muslim advocates, who were backed by conservative Christian advocates.

== List of Schools ==
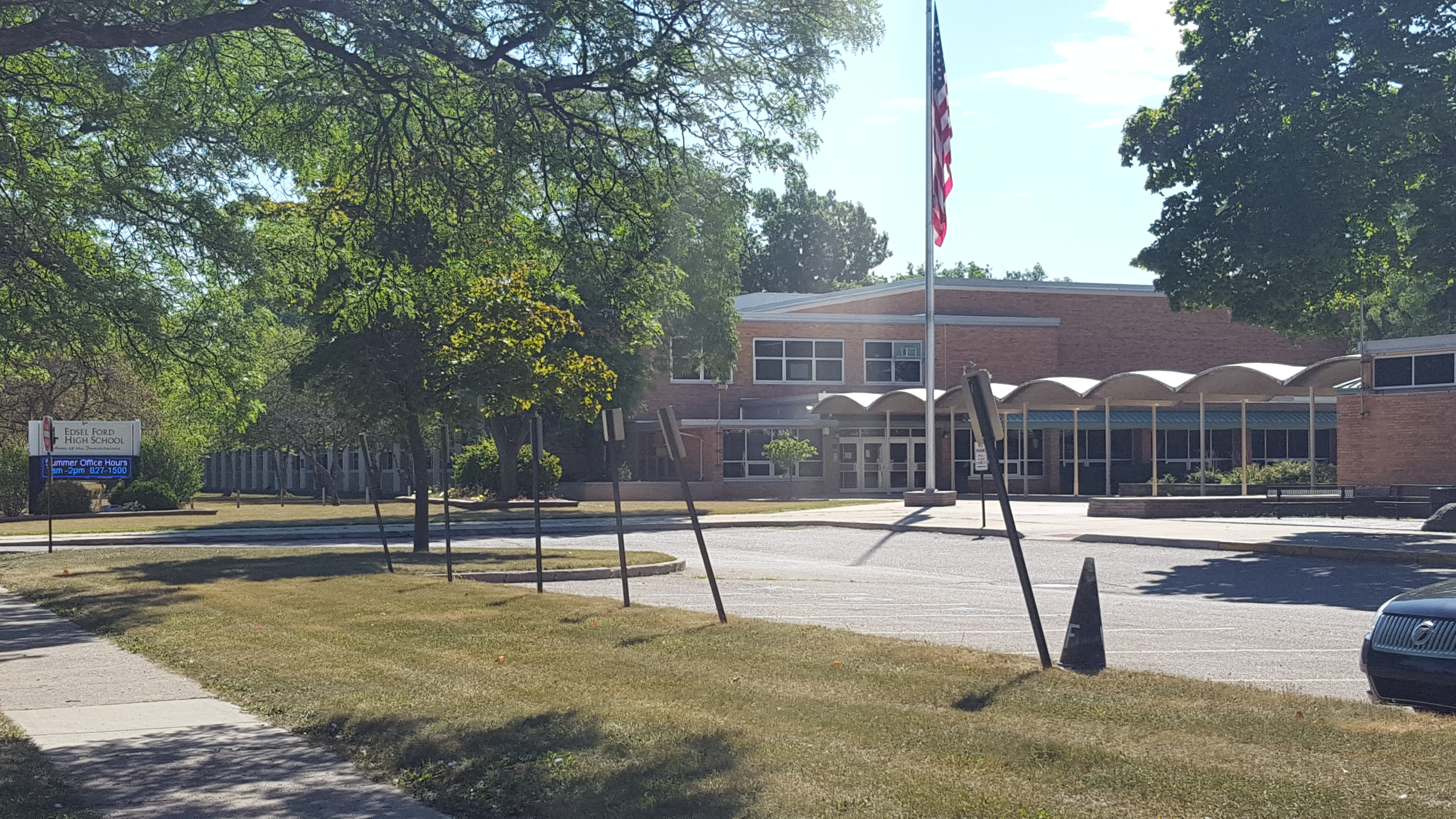
Edsel Ford High School

Schools in Dearborn Public Schools
| School | Address | Notes |
Elementary schools
| Becker Elementary School | 10821 Henson, Dearborn | |
| DuVall Elementary School | 22561 Beech, Dearborn | |
| Geer Park Elementary School | 14767 Prospect, Dearborn | |
| Haigh Elementary School | 601 N. Silvery Lane, Dearborn | |
| Henry Ford Elementary School | 16140 Driscoll, Dearborn | |
| Howard Elementary School | 1611 N. York, Dearborn | |
| Howe Montessori School | 22586 Ann Arbor Trail, Dearborn Heights | Montessori elementary school and special education center. |
| Lindbergh Elementary School | 500 N. Waverly, Dearborn | |
| Long Elementary School | 3100 Westwood, Dearborn | |
| Maples Elementary School | 6801 Mead Street, Dearborn | |
| McDonald Elementary School | 10151 Diversey, Dearborn | |
| Miller Elementary School | 4824 Lois, Dearborn | |
| Nowlin Elementary School | 23600 Penn, Dearborn | |
| Oakman Elementary School | 7545 Chase Rd., Dearborn | |
| River Oaks Elementary School | 20755 Ann Arbor Trail, Dearborn Heights | |
| Salina Elementary School | 2700 Ferney, Dearborn | Grades PreK-3 |
| Snow Elementary School | 2000 Culver, Dearborn | |
| Whitmore-Bolles Elementary School | 21501 Whitmore Street, Dearborn | |
| William Ford Elementary School | 14749 Alber, Dearborn | |
K–8 schools
| Lowrey School | 6601 Jonathon, Dearborn | |
| McCollough/Unis School | 7801 Maple, Dearborn | |
Middle schools
| Bryant Middle School | 460 N. Vernon, Dearborn | |
| O. L. Smith Middle School | 23851 Yale, Dearborn | |
| Salina Intermediate School | 2623 Salina, Dearborn | Grades 4-8. |
| STEM Middle School | 22586 Ann Arbor Trail, Dearborn Heights | Magnet school for science, technology, engineering, and mathematics. |
| Stout Middle School | 18500 Oakwood, Dearborn | |
| Woodworth Middle School | 4951 Ternes, Dearborn | |
High schools
| Dearborn High School | 19501 Outer Drive, Dearborn | |
| Edsel Ford High School | 20601 Rotunda Dr., Dearborn | |
| Fordson High School | 13800 Ford Road, Dearborn | |
Specialized high schools
| Dearborn Magnet High School | 22586 Ann Arbor Trail, Dearborn Heights | |
| Henry Ford Early College | 1 SME Drive, Dearborn | |
| Newcomer College Prep Academy | 1 SME Drive, Dearborn | |
Other educational facilities
| Adult and Community Education | 5101 Evergreen Road, Dearborn | |
| Dearborn Center for Math, Science and Technology | 22586 Ann Arbor Trail, Dearborn Heights | Special high school program. |
| Henry Ford Collegiate Academy | 1 SME Drive, Dearborn | Special high school program. |
| Michael Berry Career Center | 22586 Ann Arbor Trail, Dearborn Heights | Special high school program. |
| Cotter Early Childhood Center | 13020 Osborn St., Dearborn | Preschool. |
| Dearborn Public Schools Virtual K–12 | | Virtual school. |

Defunct Schools

- Clark (elementary school) - This school has been razed.
- Garrison, later renamed Salisbury (elementary school) - now Imam Mahdi Association Of Marajeya
- Howe (elementary school) - Programs moved to Dearborn Heights Campus. Building sold and demolished in 2019.
- Lapham (elementary school) - Now the West Village Academy.
- Miller #1 (elementary school) - This school was razed and replaced on the same site by Miller #2.
- Oxford Avenue (elementary school) - This school has been razed.
- Roulo (elementary school) - This school has been razed.
- Ten Eyck (elementary school) - Now administrative offices for the school district.
- Thayer (elementary school) - Now the Society of St. Paul's.
- William Ford #1 (elementary school) - This school was razed and replaced on the same site by William Ford #2.
- Adams (middle school) / original Dearborn High - Most of the original structure is still standing and is currently used for private offices.
- Edison (middle school) - This school has been razed.

== See also ==
- List of high schools in Michigan
