= Mike Iaquaniello =

American football player (born 1968)

No. 48
- Position: Defensive back

Personal information
- Born: February 13, 1968 (age 58); Detroit, Michigan, U.S.
- Listed height: 6 ft 3 in (1.91 m)
- Listed weight: 208 lb (94 kg)

Career information
- High school: Dearborn (MI) Fordson
- College: Michigan State
- NFL draft: 1991: undrafted

Career history
- Miami Dolphins (1991); Detroit Lions (1993)*
- * Offseason or practice squad member only
- Stats at Pro Football Reference

Michael Iaquaniello (born February 13, 1968) is an American former professional football defensive back. He played for the Miami Dolphins in 1991.
