= Trenton Public Schools (Michigan) =

School district in Michigan

Address
- 2603 Charlton Road Trenton, Wayne, Michigan, 48183; United States

District information
- Grades: Pre-Kindergarten-12
- Superintendent: Douglas Mentzer
- Schools: 4
- Budget: $47,884,000 2022-2023 expenditures
- NCES District ID: 2633900

Students and staff
- Students: 2,604 (2024-2025)
- Teachers: 179.6 (on an FTE basis) (2024-2025)
- Staff: 370.48 FTE (2024-2025)
- Student–teacher ratio: 14.5 (2024-2025)

Other information
- Website: www.trentonschools.com

Trenton Public Schools is a public school district in the Downriver area of Metro Detroit. It serves most of Trenton, Michigan.

== History ==
Prior to 1900, Trenton's school district did not include a high school. That fall, a new multi-room school opened at the intersection of 3rd Street and St. Joseph Avenue. High school students could attend the school instead of having to go to Wyandotte.

Slocum-Truax High School opened in fall 1924, replacing the former high school, which became an elementary/junior high. The Slocum and Truax families had donated the land for the high school.

$4.5 million (about $54.4 million in 2025 dollars) in construction bonds were approved in 1954 to build and remodel facilities, including the high school.

West Road Elementary, which had opened in fall 1953, was the first section of what became the present Trenton High School, which replaced Slocum-Truax as the district's high school around 1958. The architect of Trenton High School was the Dearborn firm Bennett & Straight. The Slocum-Truax building became a junior high and closed in 1979 and was demolished in 1980.

In 1970, an addition was built at Trenton High School, including a media center.

== Schools ==
Schools in Trenton Public Schools district
School	Address	Notes
Trenton High School	2601 Charlton Road	Grades 9–12.
Arthurs Middle School	4000 Marian Drive	Grades 6–8
Anderson Elementary	2600 Harrison Avenue	Grades PreK-5
Hedke Elementary	3201 Marian Drive	Grades PreK-5
