= Henry Ford College =

Public two-year college in Dearborn, Michigan, U.S.

- Motto: Pro Bono Omnium
- Type: Public community college
- Established: 1938
- President: David M. Knezek, Jr
- Administrative staff: 881 (2022)
- Undergraduates: 11,376 (2022)
- Location: Dearborn, Michigan, United States; 42.324°N 83.236°W
- Campus: Suburban (75 acres)
- Colors: Blue and white
- Nickname: Hawks
- Website: www.hfcc.edu

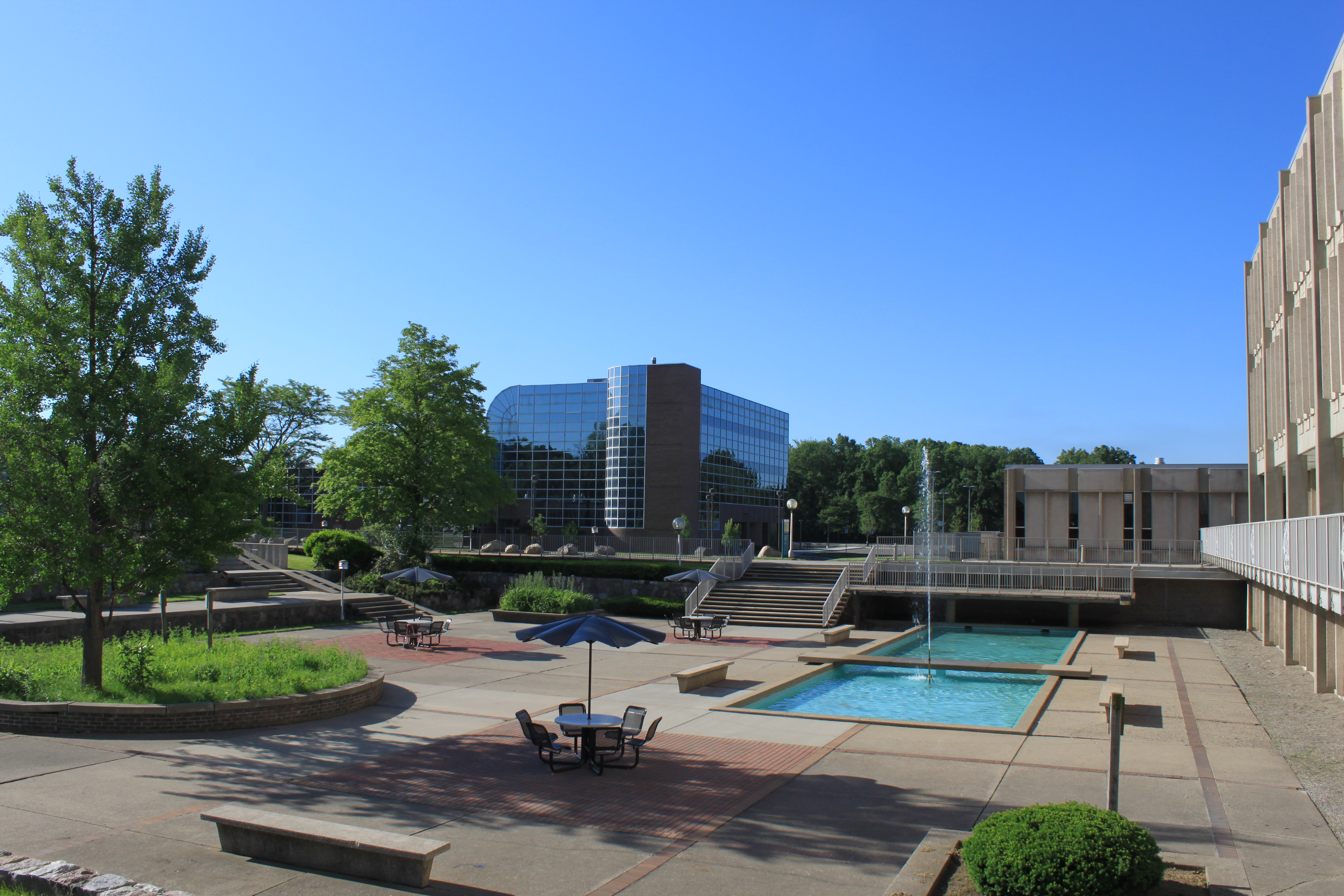
South portion of campus seen from the courtyard

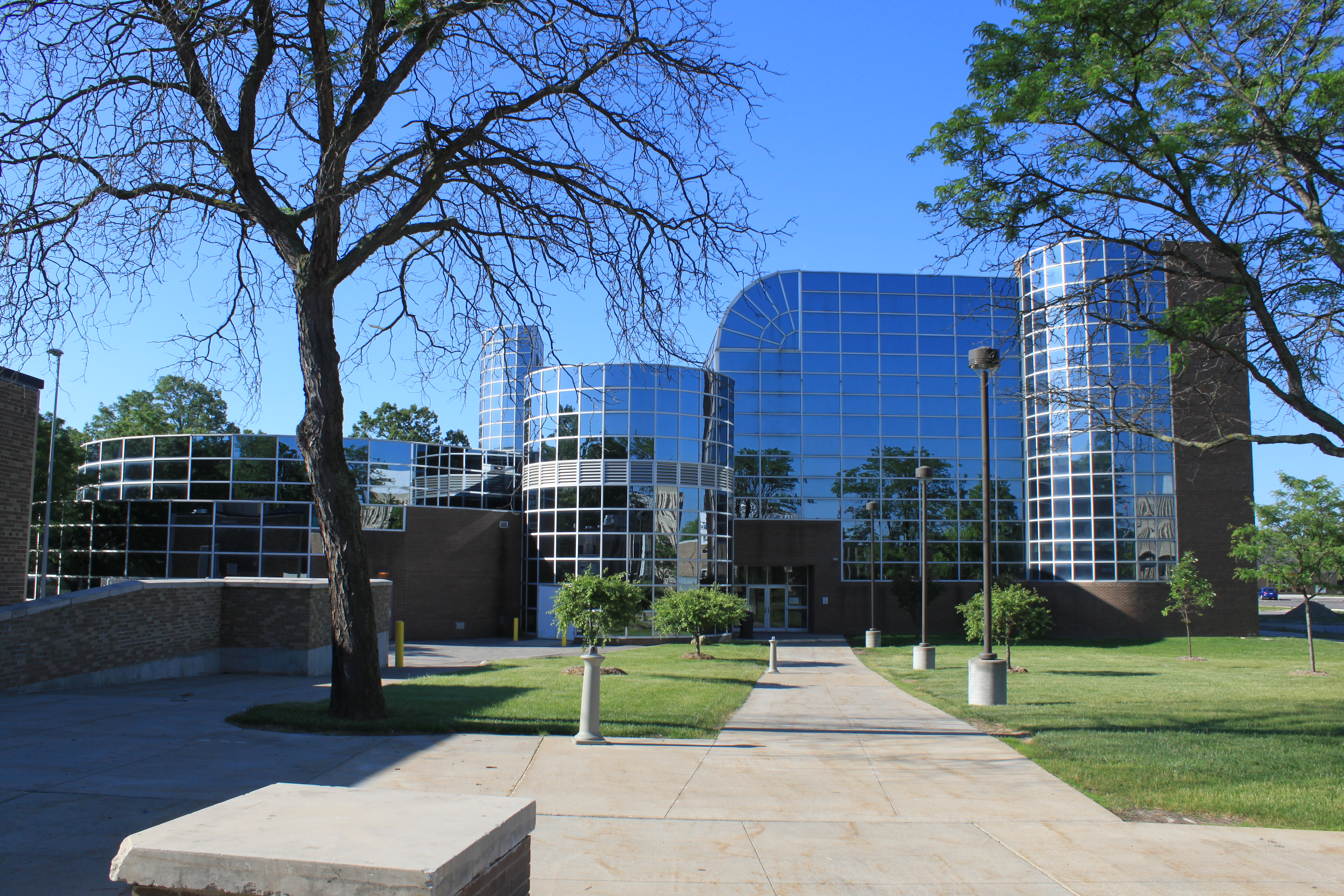
Andrew Mazzara Administration Building & Conference Center

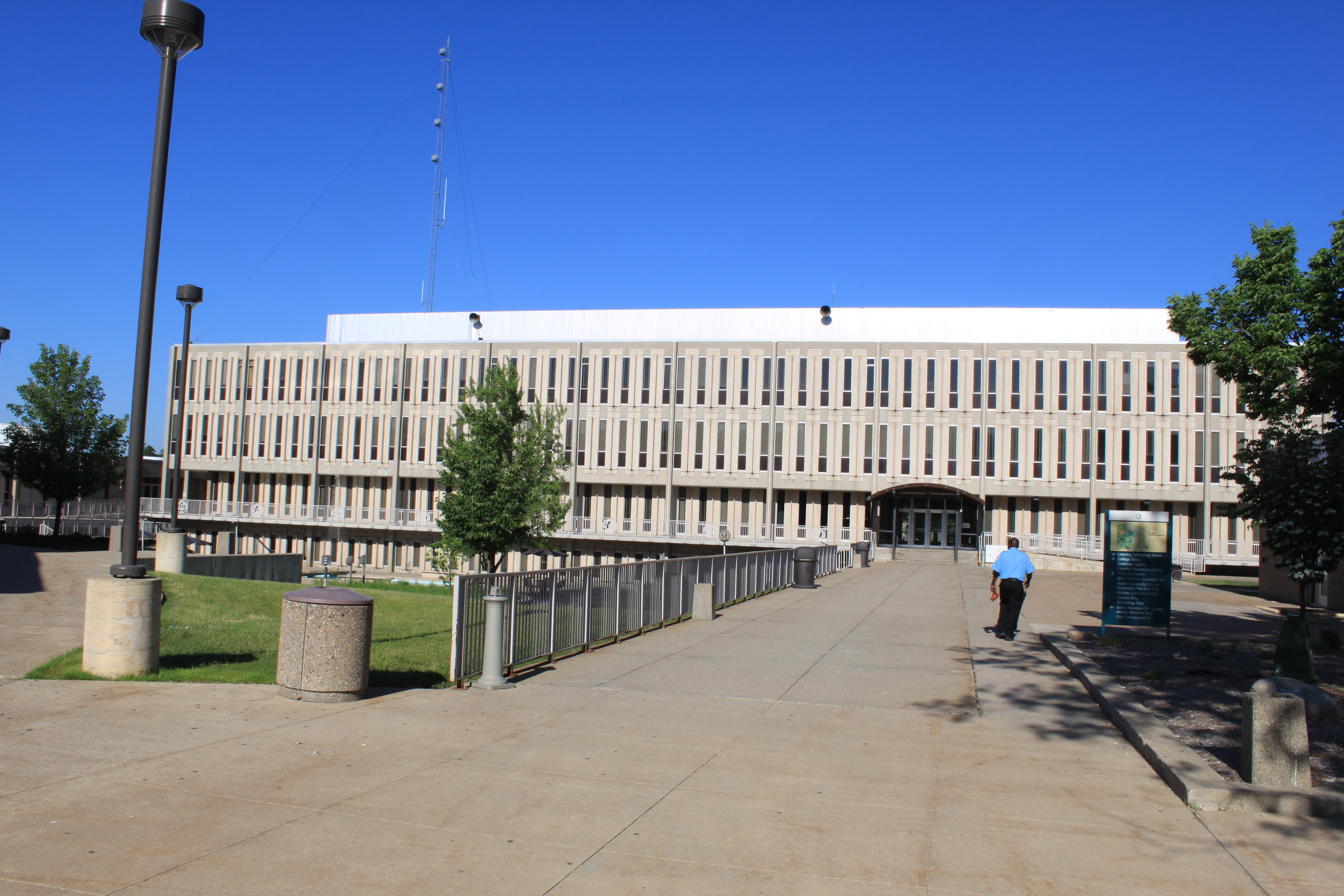
Walter P. Reuther Liberal Arts Building (viewed from the west) houses the majority of the classes at HFC including math, English, and a variety of foreign language courses.

Henry Ford College (HFC) is a public community college in Dearborn, Michigan. The institution, established in 1938 by the Dearborn Fordson Public Schools Board of Education, is accredited by the Higher Learning Commission. The institution was originally named Fordson Junior College. It adopted the name Dearborn Junior College in 1946, then Henry Ford Community College (HFCC) in 1952, after the Henry Ford Trade School which closed and whose assets were transferred to the Dearborn School Board of Education. The name was changed to Henry Ford College in 2014.

== History ==
Henry Ford Community College began operations at Fordson High School. The college initially held classes in the Fordson basement.

In the most recent academic year, Henry Ford enrolled more than 17,000 students (13,000 per semester) and had nearly 1,000 employees, including full-time and part-time.

As a public institution, the school gets support from several sources: state appropriations, student tuition and fees, local Dearborn School District property taxes, auxiliary activities, and both state and local grants.

== Academics ==
Today, HFC offers a bachelor's degree in Culinary Arts and Hospitality and many associate degrees and certificate programs in a wide variety of liberal arts, fine arts, culinary arts, business, STEM, and health science disciplines, in addition to skilled trades programs (see separate section below). The college also has a Center for Lifelong Learning which offers non-credit courses for personal enrichment or professional development. Other offerings include an honors program named for Henry Ford II and a chapter of Phi Theta Kappa (Alpha Xi Mu chapter). It also holds discipline-specific accreditations for many programs.

In addition to courses held on campus, HFC offers to students more than 450 online courses as well as hybrid courses, which split classroom time with online instruction. These courses provide an option for students who cannot, or do not wish to, commute to campus.

HFC guarantees that credits earned at its institution will be accepted in transfers to four-year colleges. HFC also uses the Michigan Transfer Agreement which transfers credits (within the requirements of the MTA) to all participating institutions. The college also guarantees to refund all tuition increases to any student who graduates within four years of starting a program.

== Athletics ==
Henry Ford's intercollegiate sports teams include men's baseball, basketball, golf and wrestling, and women's basketball, softball, golf, and volleyball. The school also has a nationally-recognized club roller hockey program, and several intramural teams.

== Campuses ==
Henry Ford offers classes on two campuses in Dearborn, Michigan. The main campus is located on the southwest corner of Ford Road and Evergreen, just north of the University of Michigan-Dearborn campus. The East Campus is home to two buildings—HFC's Michigan Technical Education Center (M-TEC) and the state-of-the-art School of Nursing Building. East Campus is located on Schaefer Road just north of Rotunda.

== See also ==
- WHFR
