= Monroe High School (Michigan) =

Location
- 901 Herr Road; Monroe, Michigan 48161; United States
- Coordinates: 41°55′6″N 83°26′14″W

Information
- Type: Public secondary school
- School district: Monroe Public Schools
- Principal: Steve Pollzzie
- Teaching staff: 65.59 (on a FTE basis)
- Grades: 9-12
- Enrollment: 1,295 (2023–24)
- Student to teacher ratio: 19.74
- Colors: Red and white
- Athletics conference: Southeastern Conference
- Nickname: Trojans
- Website: monroepublic.cyberschool.com/MHS/

Monroe High School is a public high school, serving students in grades 9–12 as a part of Monroe Public Schools.

== Demographics ==
The demographic breakdown of the 1,295 students enrolled in 2023-2024 was:

- Male - 51.1%
- Female - 48.9%
- American Indian / Alaskan Native - 0.3%
- Asian - 0.5%
- Black - 12.9%
- Hispanic - 7.6%
- White - 74.2%
- Two or more races - 4.5%

Those eligible for free or reduced price lunch made up 55.2% of the student body.

The demographic breakdown of the 1,841 students enrolled in 2014-2015 was:

- Male - 52.5%
- Female - 47.5%
- Native American/Alaskan - 0.2%
- Asian/Pacific islanders - 0.7%
- Black - 10.3%
- Hispanic - 4.1%
- White - 83.6%
- Multiracial - 1.1%

47.1% of the students were eligible for free or reduced price lunch.

== Athletics ==
The Monroe Trojans compete in the Southeastern Conference. The school colors are red and white. The following MHSAA sanctioned sports are offered:

- Baseball (boys')
- Basketball (girls' and boys')
- Bowling (girls' and boys')
- Competitive cheer (girls')
- Cross country (girls' and boys')
- Football (boys')
- Golf (girl' and boys')
- Gymnastics (girls')
- Ice hockey (boys')
- Soccer (girls' and boys')
- Softball (girls')
- Swimming and diving (girls' and boys')
- Tennis (girls' and boys')
- Track and field (girls' and boys')
  - Boys' state champions - 1931, 1936, 1937
- Volleyball (girls')
- Wrestling (boys')

== Notable alumni ==
- Audie Cole (2007): NFL linebacker
- Carl Ford (1999): NFL wide receiver
- John C. Lehr (1897): Democratic US Representative for Michigan's 2nd congressional district
- Bronco McKart (1989): boxer
- Eric Wilson (1996): NFL and CFL defensive tackle
