= Theodore Roosevelt High School (Michigan) =

High school in Wyandotte, Michigan, United States

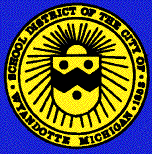

Location
- 540 Eureka Avenue; Wyandotte, Michigan 48192; United States; 42°12′04″N 83°09′25″W

Information
- School type: Secondary public school
- Established: 1923
- School district: Wyandotte Public Schools
- Principal: Benjamin Reynolds
- Teaching staff: 68.83 (on an FTE basis)
- Grades: 9-12
- Gender: Coeducational
- Enrollment: 1,230 (2023-2024)
- Student to teacher ratio: 17.87
- Campus: Suburban
- Colors: Blue and gold
- Nickname: Bears
- Newspaper: The Wy-News
- Website: www.wyandotte.org/schools/roosevelt-high-school/
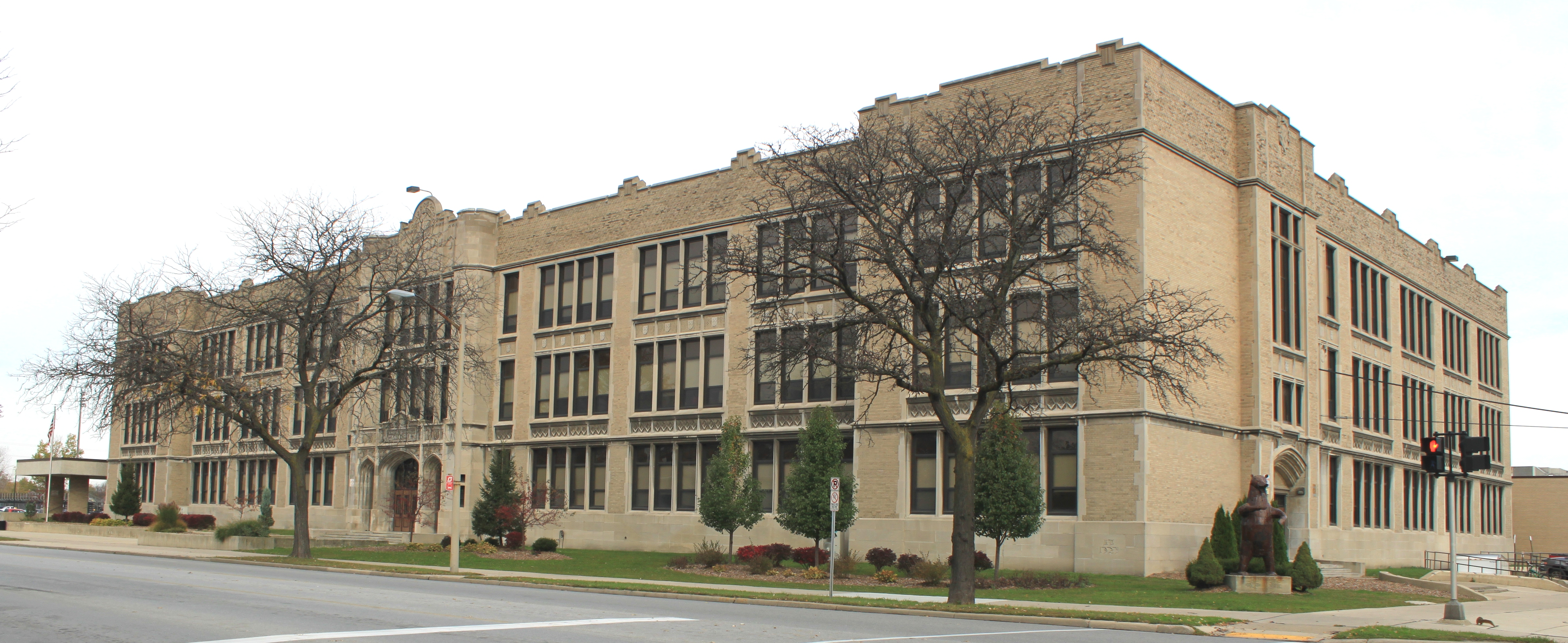

Student assessments
- 2021–22 school year Change vs. prior year

M-STEP 11th grade proficiency rates (Science / Social Studies)
- Advanced %: 10.4 / 7.5
- Proficient %: 14.1 / 20.6
- PR. Proficient %: 12.0 / 51.8
- Not Proficient %: 63.5 / 20.2

Average test scores
- SAT Total: 927.7 (▼ −33.2)

Theodore Roosevelt High School, also known as RHS or Roosevelt, or also Wyandotte High by alumni, is the secondary school serving Wyandotte, Michigan, located on Eureka Road several blocks west of Biddle Avenue. The corner stone of Roosevelt High School was laid in the fall of 1921. Roosevelt did not open its doors to students until April 1923. RHS is the only public high school in the city of Wyandotte. Its mascot is the Bear, with athletic teams with similar names (the Bears for males and the Lady Bears for females).

As of the 2014–15 school year, the school had an enrollment of 1,382 students and 60.4 classroom teachers (on an FTE basis), for a student–teacher ratio of 22.9:1. There were 501 students (36.3% of enrollment) eligible for free lunch and 106 (7.7% of students) eligible for reduced-cost lunch.

The mainstream curriculum is essentially university-preparatory, yet students do not have to enroll in all of these classes. Standard procedure for graduation is having obtained 22 of 24 possible credits, taking 4 terms of English and literature based classes, including Composition, 3 terms of Social Studies, including Economics and Government, 3 terms of Science, and 3 terms of Mathematics. Students must also include 2 terms of the Arts or Vocational training, 2 terms of a Foreign Language, and 1 term of Physical Education. The school offers several advanced and honors classes for all grades. Advanced Placement courses are offered to juniors and seniors. In addition to this, all juniors must take the Michigan Work Keys as well as an in-school session of the SAT in the second semester. Class Courses such as Mathematics were increased requirements to Algebra I, Geometry, and Algebra II is required by state. 3 years of Science is also required by state now, Physical Science, Biology and Chemistry.

== Book controversy ==
The Wyandotte Board of Education in December 2008 removed the bestselling book "The Bookseller of Kabul" by Åsne Seierstad from the school library on the claims that it was pornography. The librarian as well as a number of teachers opposed the ban, saying that students shouldn't be sheltered from learning the truth about what goes on in other parts of the world.

== Athletics ==
Roosevelt competes in the Downriver League.

Roosevelt won state championships for hockey in 2011 and boys bowling in 2016.

== Notable alumni ==
- Ed Mierkowicz, former MLB player (Detroit Tigers, St. Louis Cardinals)
- Gwen Frostic, artist
- Gerald Mayhew, current NHL player (Florida Panthers)
