= Hartland High School (Michigan) =

High school in Hartland Township, Livingston County, Michigan

Location
- 10635 Dunham Road; Hartland, Michigan 48353; United States; 42°38′59″N 83°44′50″W

Information
- Type: Public school
- School district: Hartland Consolidated Schools
- Principal: James Fitzgerald
- Teaching staff: 82.73 (on FTE basis)
- Grades: 9 - 12
- Enrollment: 1,655 (2023-2024)
- Student to teacher ratio: 20.00
- Colors: Blue and gold
- Athletics conference: Kensington Lakes Activities Association (West Division)
- Nickname: Eagles
- Website: www.hartlandhighschool.us

Student assessments
- 2021–22 school year Change vs. prior year

M-STEP 11th grade proficiency rates (Science / Social Studies)
- Advanced %: 15.4 / 8.0
- Proficient %: 19.0 / 20.8
- PR. Proficient %: 16.6 / 46.3
- Not Proficient %: 49.0 / 24.9

Average test scores
- SAT Total: 1033.4 (▼ −24.5)

Hartland High School is a public high school located in Hartland Township, near the historic village of Hartland, within Livingston County, Michigan. During the 2023-2024 school year, the school enrolled 1,655 students in grades 9 through 12.

Originally a K-12 consolidated school when it was established in 1921 on Hartland Road near downtown Hartland, it became a junior-senior high school in 1951 when the new Village Primary School was built. By then, the last of the fifteen rural districts was annexed, forming Hartland Consolidated Schools' current boundaries. By 1958, it had relocated to a new location on Hibner Road; the old high school became a middle school. By 1973 both the Village Primary School and Hartland High School had outgrown their buildings, and Hartland High School moved to a new location on M-59. The 1958 Hartland High School building became the present Hartland Village Elementary, while the 1951 Village Primary School building became a community education building and eventually a preschool building. The current high school building opened in September 2003. The former high school became the district central office. At the same time the 1921 building was demolished, though its next door neighbor, Cromaine District Library, which had been built in 1927, still stands.

== Athletics ==
Hartland High School athletics changed conferences from the Kensington Valley Conference to the Kensington Lakes Activities Association at the beginning of the 2008 school year.
