= Crestwood High School (Michigan) =

High School in Dearborn Heights, Michigan

Location
- 1501 North Beech Daly Road; Dearborn Heights, Michigan 48127; United States; 42°19′18″N 83°17′39″W

Information
- School type: Public, magnet high school
- Established: 1965; 61 years ago
- School district: Crestwood School District
- NCES School ID: 260001603912
- Principal: Roni Abdulhadi
- Teaching staff: 62.07 (FTE)
- Grades: 9-12
- Enrollment: 1,272 (2024-2025)
- Student to teacher ratio: 20.49
- Colors: Blue, gold and white
- Nickname: Chargers
- Website: www.csdmi.org/chs

Student assessments
- 2022–23 school year Change vs. prior year

M-STEP 11th grade proficiency rates (Science / Social Studies)
- Advanced %: 10.3 / ≤5
- Proficient %: 15.7 / ‐
- PR. Proficient %: 11.0 / 51.0
- Not Proficient %: 63.0 / 25.0

Average test scores
- SAT Total: 945.6 (▲ +1)

Crestwood High School (CHS) is a public, magnet high school in Dearborn Heights, Michigan, United States. It was founded in 1965, and is located on Beech Daly Road between Ford Road and Cherry Hill Road. It is a part of the Crestwood School District.

== Athletics ==
CHS students are involved in numerous sports throughout all three seasons.

=== Fall sports ===
- Football
- Girls' volleyball
- Girls' swimming
- Girls' golf
- Boys' soccer
- Cross country
- Boys' tennis

=== Winter sports ===
- Boys' basketball
- Girls' basketball
- Boys' swimming
- Boys' bowling
- Girls' bowling
- Wrestling

=== Spring sports ===
- Baseball
- Softball
- Girls' tennis
- Track and field
- Girls' soccer
- Boys' golf
- Boys' rowing
- Girls' rowing
- eSports

CHS is a member of the Western Wayne Athletic Conference.

== Notable alumni ==
- Garrett Clayton - actor and singer
- David Knezek - politician
- Robert L. McKenzie - domestic and foreign policy analyst, public commentator, and scholar of the Middle East and North Africa
- Aleta (Rzepecki) Sill - professional bowler, member of the PWBA and USBC Halls of Fame
- Pete Stoyanovich - NFL football placekicker
- Chris Tamer - NHL hockey player
- Gary Wayne - Major League Baseball pitcher
