= Wyandotte Public Schools =

School district in Michigan

Address
- 639 Oak St. Wyandotte, Wayne, Michigan, 48192; United States

District information
- Grades: Pre-Kindergarten-12
- Superintendent: Dr. James E. Anderson
- Schools: 9
- Budget: $101,016,000 2022-2023 expenditures
- NCES District ID: 2636540

Students and staff
- Students: 4,171 (2024-2025)
- Teachers: 306.0 (on an FTE basis) (2024-2025)
- Staff: 797.0 FTE (2024-2025)
- Student–teacher ratio: 13.63 (2024-2025)

Other information
- Website: www.wyandotte.org

Wyandotte Public Schools is a public school district in the Downriver region of Metro Detroit. It serves Wyandotte, Michigan.

== History ==
The first school in Wyandotte was built in 1837. The "Old Brown School," which was built in 1856 on Chestnut Street, could hold over one hundred students and also served as a meeting place for the city council and church congregations. Wyandotte's high school was established in a new building in 1869. A school called Garfield Elementary was built in 1886, replacing the "Old Brown School," which was sold the next year.

The second building to house the high school opened in 1905, and the third and present high school was opened in 1923. In the 1920s, the district adopted a policy of neighborhood schools so that no student would be more than a half mile from their school. Schools built during this period included Washington Elementary in 1930 and Garfield School in 1933, both designed by architect B. C. Wetzel. Carl R. Jensen designed McKinley Elementary, built in 1939, which closed in 2009.

Wyandotte's high school is called Roosevelt High School, carrying on a district tradition established in 1901 of naming schools after United States Presidents. It opened in February, 1923. The school was expanded in 1957, 1962, and renovated and further expanded in the 1970s, with the expansions shown completed in the 1976 yearbook.

== Schools ==
List of schools in Wyandotte Public Schools district
School	Address	Notes
Early Childhood Center	2609 10th St.	Preschool
Garfield Elementary School	340 Superior	Grades K-5. Built 1933.
Jefferson Elementary School	1515 15th St.	Grades K-5. Built 1950.
Madison Center	4460 18th St.	Special education school for grades K-12. Built 1953.
Monroe Elementary School	1501 Grove	Grades K-5. Opened fall 1955.
Washington Elementary School	1440 Superior	Grades K-5. Built 1930.
The Lincoln Center	891 Goddard Rd.	School for students with disabilities, serving 17 area districts. Previously William H. Taft Elementary. Built 1956.
Wilson Middle School	1275 15th St.	Grades 6-8. Opened fall 1956.
Roosevelt High School	540 Eureka Ave.	Grades 9-12. Opened 1923.
Jo Brighton Center	4460 18th St.	Post-secondary adult transition center for impaired students.
