= Trenton High School (Michigan) =

High school in Trenton, Michigan, United States

Location
- 2601 Charlton Road; Trenton, Michigan 48183; United States
- 42°08′35″N 83°12′00″W

Information
- Type: Public secondary
- Established: 1900
- Teaching staff: 41.92 (FTE)
- Grades: 9-12
- Enrollment: 839 (2023-24)
- Student to teacher ratio: 20.01
- Campus: Suburban
- Colors: Blue and gold
- Nickname: Trojans
- Yearbook: Monguagon
- Website: ths.trentonschools.com

Student assessments
- 2021–22 school year

M-STEP 11th grade proficiency rates (Science / Social Studies)
- Advanced %: 17.4 / 13.1
- Proficient %: 28.6 / 26.8
- PR. Proficient %: 12.7 / 43.2
- Not Proficient %: 41.3 / 16.9

Average test scores
- SAT Total: 1160

Trenton High School is a public high school in Trenton, Michigan, one of four schools in Trenton Public Schools. The school serves the city of Trenton and is a magnet school for special education students, specifically for those with hearing disabilities, from across Downriver. Enrollment for the 2012-13 school year was about 1200.

== Notable alumni ==
- Jim Diamond is an American music producer, musician, and runs Ghetto Recorders studio, formerly located in Detroit, MI.
- Ann Marie Lipinski, former Chicago Tribune editor and Pulitzer Prize winner, who was editor of the Trojan Trumpet , graduated in 1974.
- Anthony Bass, former Toronto Blue Jays relief pitcher.
- Bradley A. Smith, Law professor, a Clinton appointee to the Federal Election Commission, elected Chairman of the Commission in 2004, was born and raised in Trenton, elected Senior Class President, and graduated Trenton High in 1976.
- Mary Lynn Rajskub, comedian and actress, was born and raised in Trenton, and graduated from Trenton High School in 1989.
- J. J. Putz, a relief pitcher for the Seattle Mariners, New York Mets, Chicago White Sox and Arizona Diamondbacks as well as a 2007 MLB All-Star Game participant, was raised in Trenton, and graduated from Trenton High School in 1995.
- Professional Comedian Tim Slagle was raised in Trenton, and graduated Trenton High in 1976
- Psychobilly frontman Jim Leedy, of the cult band Elvis Hitler was born and raised in Trenton, and graduated Trenton High in 1979.
- Science fiction author Sarah Zettel was raised in Trenton and is a 1984 graduate of Trenton High School.
- Toronto Blue Jays starting pitcher Matt Shoemaker grew up in Trenton, and graduated from Trenton High School in 2004.
- Andy Greene, professional hockey player for the New York Islanders
- Tom Burkhard is American television producer and writer.
- Former NHL player Larry DePalma was born in Trenton and is a 1983 Trenton High School graduate.
