= Edsel Ford High School =

Public high school in Dearborn, Michigan, United States

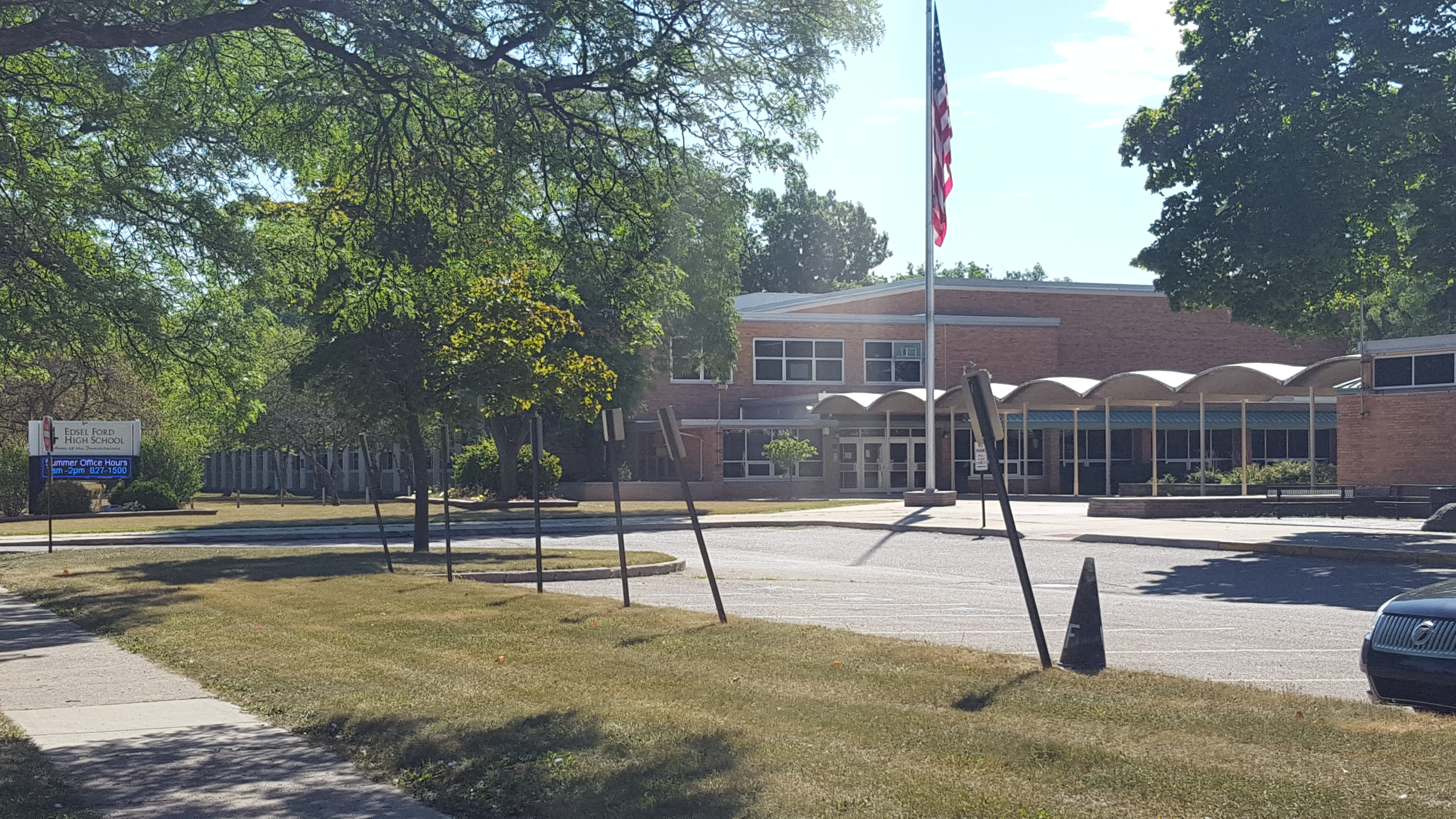

Location
- 20601 Rotunda; Dearborn, Michigan 48124; United States; 42°17′23.6″N 83°14′1.7″W

Information
- Type: Public High School
- Established: 1955
- School district: Dearborn Public Schools
- Principal: Rima Hassan
- Teaching staff: 87.90 (FTE)
- Grades: 9-12
- Enrollment: 1,571 (2023-2024)
- Student to teacher ratio: 17.87
- Campus: Suburban
- Colors: Black and white
- Nickname: Thunderbirds
- Accreditation: North Central Association
- Yearbook: Flight
- Affiliation: Downriver League
- Website: efhs.dearbornschools.org

Student assessments
- 2021–22 school year Change vs. prior year

M-STEP 11th grade proficiency rates (Science / Social Studies)
- Advanced %: 12.7 / 7.8
- Proficient %: 21.5 / 23.8
- PR. Proficient %: 10.4 / 45.9
- Not Proficient %: 55.4 / 22.5

Average test scores
- SAT Total: 910.5 (▼ −19.4)

Edsel Ford High School is a public high school located in Dearborn, Michigan, United States, in Metro Detroit. Edsel Ford, located on Rotunda Drive, near Oakwood, is one of three public high schools in the Dearborn Public Schools (along with Fordson and Dearborn High).

The school's enrollment includes members of all of the major ethnic groups within Dearborn.

== History ==
Edsel Ford High School opened in 1955, with its first graduating class completing their studies in 1956. It is named after Edsel Bryant Ford, the son of automotive pioneer Henry Ford.

The school was constructed on land donated by the Ford Motor Company. Its original design reflected contemporary educational philosophies of the mid-20th century, emphasizing innovative architectural layouts, a strong focus on the humanities, and college preparatory programs. Planning for the school began in 1951, and its completion in 1956 coincided with the rapid suburban development of Dearborn during that period.

As part of its unique curriculum, an English Humanities program was introduced in the late 1950s as an experimental, interdisciplinary program that integrated literature, music, and visual arts into a unified educational experience.

According to a 1958 education journal, the program approached these disciplines as interconnected forms of human expression, with students participating in the course throughout their high school years. The 1959 Flight yearbook noted that six semesters of English Humanities were required, combining instruction in writing, grammar, and punctuation with the critical analysis of artistic and musical works. The program aimed to foster a deeper understanding of human emotion, thought, and creativity across various media.

By the early 1960s, the English Humanities program had gained recognition as part of a broader national movement toward integrated arts education. Although the school has since transitioned to a more traditional English curriculum—offering standard, honors, and Advanced Placement courses—the interdisciplinary philosophy of the original program continues to influence the school's approach to humanities education.

The curriculum included formal assessments such as midterms and finals in art, music, and English—an unusual level of rigor for a high school program at the time. The program remained a central part of the school's curriculum for several decades and continued into the mid-2000s.

== Extra-curricular activities ==
=== Athletics ===
Edsel Ford competes in the Downriver League

The school offers a wide range of sports including football, swimming, baseball, basketball, hockey, cheerleading and more. T. C. Cameron, author of Metro Detroit's High School Football Rivalries, wrote that Edsel's athletic rivalry with Dearborn High School "has always been spirited" and that Edsel’s teams "never pass on a chance" to challenge Dearborn High in games.

=== Clubs ===
The school offers a wide range of clubs—from arts & media and cultural groups to STEM competitions, service organizations, and performing arts ensembles.

== Notable alumni ==
=== Arts ===
- Kristen Doute, television personality
- Suzanne Sena, current Onion News anchor, and host of Celebrity Homes on E!

=== Sports ===
- Jim Cummins, retired NHL player
- Dan Enos (1986), quarterbacks coach at Wake Forest University.
- Dakota Joshua (2014), professional ice hockey forward
- Derek Lowe (1991), retired Major League Baseball pitcher
- John Vigilante (2003), professional ice hockey forward
