= Fordson High School =

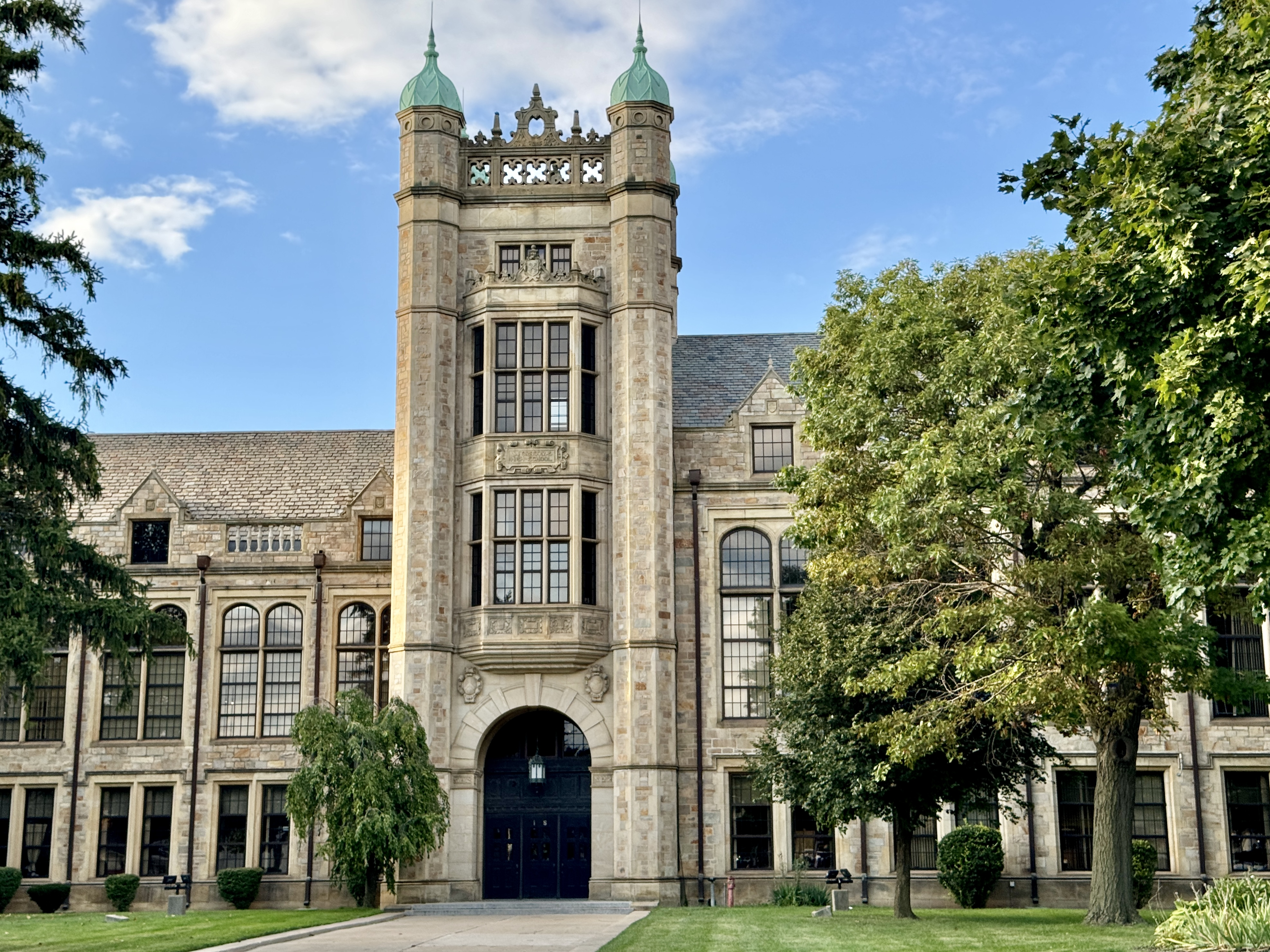

Location
- 13800 Ford Road; Dearborn, Michigan 48126; United States; 42°19′48″N 83°10′44″W

Information
- Type: Public high school
- Established: 1922
- School district: Dearborn Public Schools
- Principal: Chadi Farhat
- Faculty: 110.92 (FTE)
- Grades: 9-12
- Enrollment: 2,092 (2023–2024)
- Student to teacher ratio: 18.86
- Campus: Suburban
- Colors: Maize and blue
- Athletics conference: Kensington Lakes Activities Association
- Mascot: Tractors
- Rival: Dearborn High School Pioneers
- Accreditation: North Central Association
- Newspaper: The Fordson Tower Tribune
- Yearbook: Fleur de lis
- Website: School website

Fordson High School is a secondary school located in Dearborn, Michigan, United States, in Metro Detroit. It was completed in 1928 on a 15-acre (61,000 m^{2}) parcel of land which was then the village of Fordson, named for Henry Ford and his son Edsel Ford. It is a part of Dearborn Public Schools.

== History ==
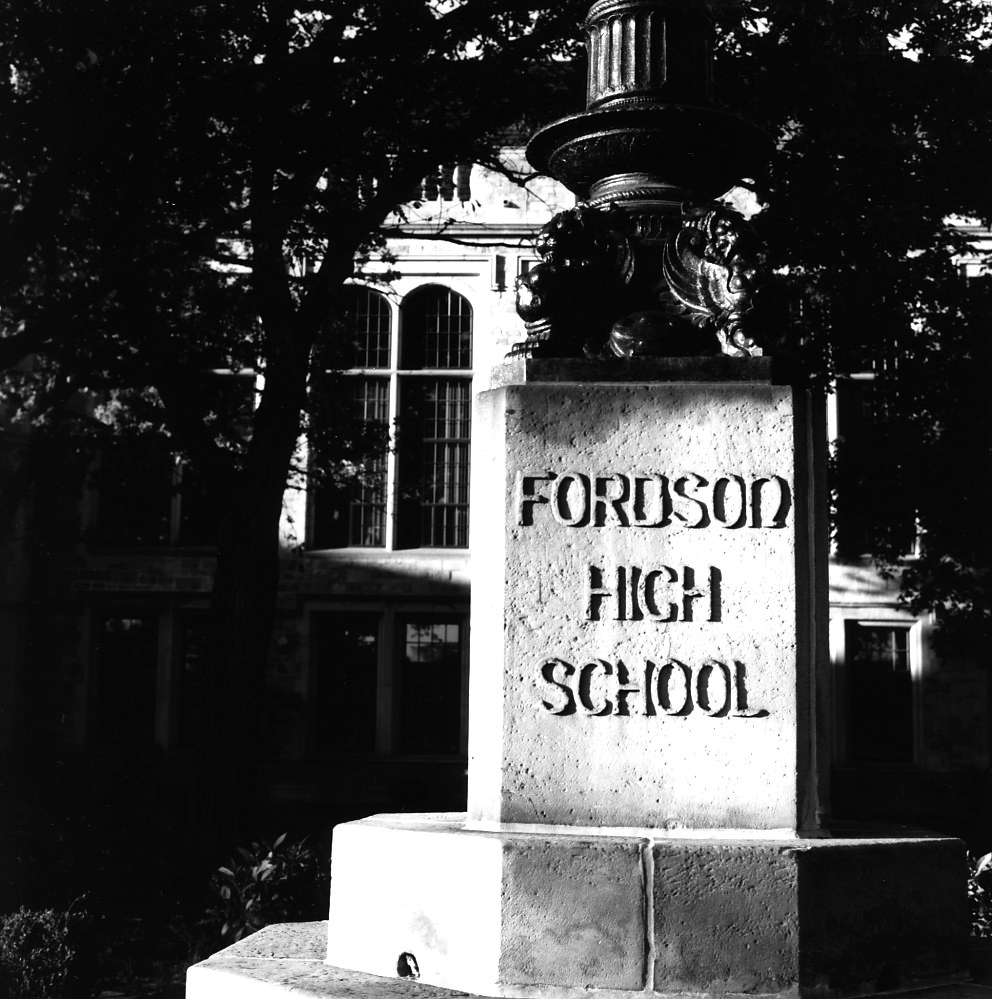
Fordson flagpole

Prior to the opening of the school, students attended the nearby Miller School. Henry Ford contributed most of the money that was used to build the school. Fordson was named as such since the community of Fordson was originally separate from Dearborn, prior to the year the school opened. The cost to construct the campus was $2,500,000.

Ground was broken for the original school building in 1926, with representatives from each of the four entering grades participating. The senior class president was George E. Sarkozy, who participated in the ceremony. The school was designed by architect Everett Lane Williams of the Detroit architectural firm Van Leyen, Schilling & Keough. The school building, designed in the Collegiate Gothic style, was inspired in part by the buildings of the University of Michigan Law School in Ann Arbor, Michigan as well as the Rushton and Apethore halls in Northamptonshire, England.

Henry Ford Community College began operations at Fordson High. The college initially held classes in the Fordson basement.

=== Fordson Tower ===
The Tower was constructed in 1926 and has been used for various things. During World War II, it was used to spot enemy aircraft that could have been headed for the River Rouge Plant, where tanks were in production. The media center used the Tower for archival storage, classes, and media center office space. Students of Fordson hung signs over the Tower, including a "for sale" sign in the 1950s, and the most recent, in 1993, exclaiming Fordson's state championship in football.

=== Renovations and additions ===
In 2005, an addition was adjoined to the northwestern body of the school. A cafeteria, ten classrooms including science and computer labs, and the replacement of the greenhouse comprised the new wing. The addition preserved the structure and appearance of the school by using the alternating dark and light limestone scheme and proceeding with the same architectural model developed from the school's inception. Consequently, Fordson received the Governor's Award for Historic Preservation and has been featured in many publications including the Masonry Institute of Michigan and the architects of the addition, TMP architecture.

In 2007, the athletic facilities underwent an extensive renovation. The natural turf varsity football field and the practice field on the eastern side of the athletic campus were replaced by AstroTurf surfaces. The track and tennis courts were also renovated. Beyond the tennis courts on the northern side of the campus, trees were planted when a seldom used sidewalk was demolished. Sarkozy field, the prior soccer field for the school was sold to the city of Dearborn for $800,000. The total cost before the sale was $1.6 million.

=== 2000s onward ===
School administration:

The current principal of Fordson (2025-2026) is alumnus Chadi Farhat.

In 2009 the Wayne County Regional Education Service Agency issued a report strongly asking Fordson High's administration to only use Arabic when absolutely necessary to communicate to students and parents. The school district administration stated they disagreed with the decision and would not enact it.

Fordson is located in Dearborn, the largest Arab community outside the Middle East, where more than 40% of the residents are of Arab ancestry. This is reflected at Fordson, where approximately, as of 2006, 95% of the 2,700 student body is of Arab ancestry. According to SchoolMatters, in 2006, 91.6% of students passed the Michigan reading test while 80.4% passed the math portion. Of the students taking the ACT, the average score was 19.7 out of a possible 36. According to the 2015 Mackinac Center Report, Fordson High School was ranked the 13th Best Non-Charter Public High School in the State of Michigan due to gains over the last five years of all subgroups.

In 2011, North Shore Films produced Fordson- Faith, Fasting, Football and the American Dream, highlighting the Fordson football tradition and its deep roots within the Dearborn community.

== Campus ==
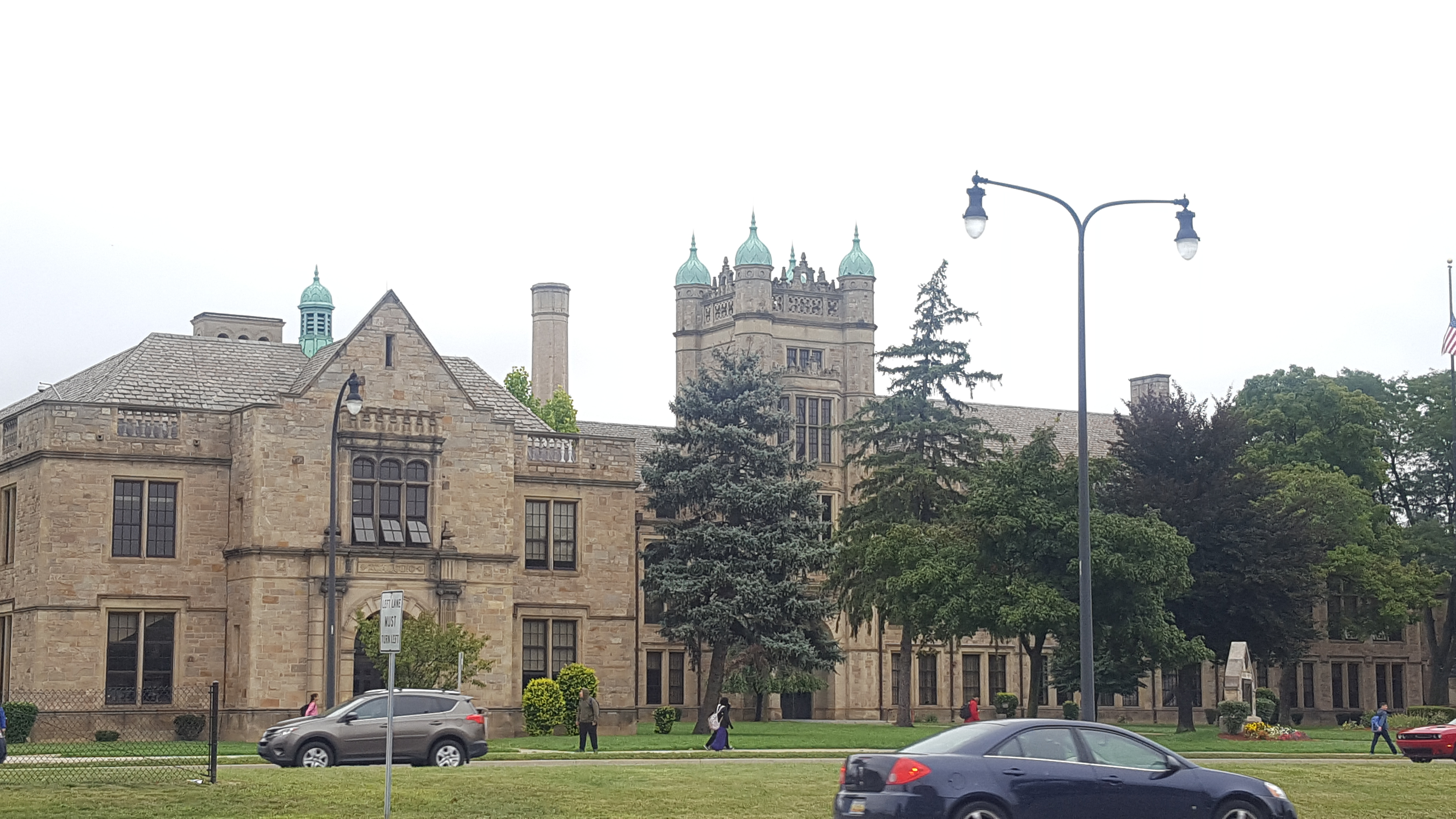
Fordson High

The campus has a Gothic Revival style design. The exterior of Fordson is made of granite and uses Briar Hill sandstone trim. The library has hand carved oak paneling, a fireplace, painted wall murals by Zoltan Sepeshy, tapestries and Jacobean fumed-oak furnishings and many bronze and marble statues including Athena, Apollo, Artemis, Nike, Niobe, Venus, and Mercury. The main entrance has ten busts that include philosophers, playwrights, and mathematicians like Plato, Aristotle, Aristedes, Sophocles, Homer, Demosthenes, Aesculapius, Euripides, Pindar, Archimedes, and Socrates. The main hall also includes a blue and gold Fordson Tractor with lettering of state champions imprinted on its top. The building features architectural sculpture by Corrado Parducci. Fordson's architecture was represented in the 1987 film The Rosary Murders when the library and tower were displayed. The school became recognized as a Michigan Historical Site in 1998.

The 1928 swimming pool uses Pewabic Pottery tile and formerly had a skylight. It houses swim team and physical education swimming classes.

== Academics ==
=== Academic performance ===
Student assessments
- 2021–22 school year

In 1986, Tom Hundley of the Detroit Free Press wrote that the school "has a reputation for solid academics." In 1986, many students matriculated to Henry Ford Community College.

As of 2016, according to Brian Stone of the Huffington Post, Fordson was "consistently praised" because larger than average numbers of its students, many of whom were from low socioeconomic backgrounds, matriculated to elite universities.

=== Programs ===
By 1986, the school established an English as a second language program for newly arrived immigrants. In 1986, the program had 46 students.

By 1986, the school established a program to defuse tensions between Arab and non-Arab students through periodic meetings.

== Athletics ==
Fordson is a member of the Kensington Lakes Activities Association. Wayne Drehs of ESPN wrote that the football team uses a very aggressive style of play. The school's football team performed strongly since Fordson first opened. By 2003 the team had received 22 conference titles, four Michigan state titles, and four runner-up finishes; Christopher Lawlor of USA Today stated that the Fordson football team "traditionally is one of Michigan's top teams". In a 38-year period until 2006 the team lost four seasons total.

Its primary rival is intracity foe Dearborn High School. According to T.C. Cameron, author of the 2008 book Metro Detroit's High School Football Rivalries, the games have been "scrubbed for years at a time" and that the rivalry was "love-to-hate". Fordson High students perceive Dearborn High as being more affluent than Fordson. The rivalry was affected by the 2006 job change of Jeff Stergalas, previously the head coach of Fordson, into being an assistant coach at Dearborn High School. In 2015 both schools held food drives to coincide with the Dearborn-Ford football game.

It also plays against Edsel Ford High School while also having a longtime rivalry with Monroe High School, an opponent since 1928 when Fordson was established. The school's strongest program lies within its football team. Fordson Football has accumulated 4 state championships (1930, 1943,1971, 1993).

By 1986, some Muslim female students and their parents wanted separate physical education classes for girls, so the school established such classes.

=== State champions ===
Year	Sport	Result	Class
1952	Boys' swimming	State champions	A
1953	Boys' basketball	State champions	A
1953	Boys' swimming	State champions	A
1954	Boys' swimming	State champions	A
1975*	Volleyball	State champions	A
1976	Volleyball	State champions	A
1993	Football	State champions	AA

- Fordson won the 1975 State Volleyball Championship, although it was not an MHSAA-sanctioned tournament. The MHSAA started sponsoring volleyball in 1976.

== Student life ==
=== Student body ===
When Fordson first opened, about all of the students were European American. For much of its history the students were immigrants of Greek, Italian, and Polish heritage, or other areas in Central and Southern regions of the continent. Many had parents working for the automobile industry. In 1986 the school had 1,755 students. The majority of non-Arab students, referred to as "Americans" or "Anglos" in the school parlance, were of Italian and Greek heritage, and were by then in their second and third generations.

Arab Americans had been in the student body since the establishment of the school, with the original generations prior to the late 1960s seeking to fully assimilate into the dominant culture of the area. By the 1970s numbers of Arab Americans increased. Numbers of students of Arab ancestry increased after the outbreak of the Lebanese Civil War and the 1978 South Lebanon conflict. By 1986 Arab Americans were almost 40% of the student body, with Lebanese, Egyptian, Syrian, and Yemeni-origin students represented, with the first group being the largest. Some of the students fled strife and were relatively uneducated before coming to Fordson. Unlike previous generations, some students chose to avoid assimilation. Some felt that they were not meant to stay in the United States permanently. By 1986 the school had established a prayer room for students and began accommodating requests from devout students, such as exempting them from some classes. In addition to Arab immigrants, there were students of recent non-Arab immigrant backgrounds, including Albanians, Ivorians, Pakistanis, and Romanians.

As of 2002 Arab Americans made up over 90% of the student body, and as of 2012 Muslims made up about 97% of the students. In the 2000s, those of Lebanese Shia ancestry made up the largest group of Arab students. Among the Arab students were longtime residents as well as recent immigrants; as of 2002 the latter often ate lunch inside the student cafeteria. Longtime residents, who often ate lunch in off-campus restaurants, thought the recent immigrants, known as "boaters" meaning "fresh off the boat" in area Arab-American slang, had a lack of sophistication. In the words of Gary David and Kenneth K. Ayouby, authors of "Being Arab and Becoming Americanized: Forms of Mediated Assimilation in Metropolitan Detroit," the longtimers perceived the recent immigrants as being "nerdy".

To accommodate religious Muslims, the cafeteria offers halal food. In 2003 52 of 53 members of the football team were Muslim while the coach was Catholic, and players used Arabic on the field to issue commands. Around that period some Muslim players active during the Islamic month of Ramadan chose to break their fasts, which they would normally observe, in order to play in the games. By 2010 coach Fouad Zaban began holding football practice at night in order to make it easier for devout Muslims to participate during Ramadan. Zaban had received approval to do so from Fordson and DPS administrators as well as the Dearborn police department and area residents. In the previous 30 years, Ramadan had not coincided with the beginning of football season.

The film Fordson: Faith, Fasting, Football documented the Muslim football players at Dearborn High; a 2003 USA Today article inspired a British Indian Muslim, Rashid Ghazi to produce and direct the film.

=== Traditions ===
Fordson has many traditions within its history. Every class that graduates from Fordson provides the school with a gift. The class of 1956 presented seventy-six flags representing members of the United Nations of that year. The flags have been used at every graduation since then with many other flags being donated over the years. Football has a strong tradition within the school and the helmet is a basic element of this example. The helmet at Fordson comprises yellow with two blue stripes over the top for the varsity team, one for the junior varsity team and zero for the freshman team. Also tradition, the stripes are made with electrical tape.

==== Winthrop Trip ====
Every spring since 1991, a few Fordson juniors and seniors have had the opportunity to travel by train across the country to Winthrop, Washington. They visit Liberty Bell Junior-Senior High School and teach the local elementary students about the history and politics of Michigan.

== Notable alumni ==
- Ed Bagdon, guard and linebacker for Chicago Cardinals and Washington Redskins; at Michigan State University; received 1949 Outland Trophy for being nation's top lineman
- Robert Saleh, NFL Football Coach
- Abdullah Hammoud, Mayor of Dearborn, MI
- Chuck Davey, Michigan State University and Olympic boxer, boxing commissioner for state of Michigan
- William Dear, Hollywood director, most notably of Angels in the Outfield and Harry and the Hendersons
- Jim Dunbar, radio program director, talk show host, and news anchor; elected to National Radio Hall of Fame for work with KGO in 1999; portrayed in 2007 film Zodiac
- Chad Everett (1955), film and TV actor, appeared in more than forty films and television series, including Medical Center (1969–1976)
- Artie Fields (1939), bandleader, songwriter, record producer and jazz trumpeter
- Thomas Forsthoefel, chair of the religious studies department at Mercyhurst College
- Russ Gibb, concert promoter, most notably of MC5 and Iggy Pop
- Robert P. Griffin, former US senator, former Michigan Supreme Court associate justice
- Joe Hamood, Houston Mavericks basketball player
- Orville L. Hubbard, mayor of Dearborn
- Mike Iaquaniello, quarterback for Michigan State and NFL's Miami Dolphins
- Marian Bayoff Ilitch (1951), founder and owner of Little Caesars Pizza and Motor City Casino; inducted into the Michigan Sports Hall of Fame in 2008
- Art James, television game show host; hosted Blank Check and The Magnificent Marble Machine; also announcer for a dozen game shows including Family Feud
- Andrea Joyce, sports broadcaster
- John C. Kornblum, diplomat, ambassador to Germany, responsible for Ronald Reagan's historic speech in Berlin 1987
- John Lesinski, Jr. former congressman for Michigan (D, 1951–1965)
- Mei Lin, chef, Top Chef Season 12 winner
- Adele Mara, actress, most famous for her role in Sands of Iwo Jima
- Charles "Kid" McCoy, world champion boxer
- Fadwa Obeid, Lebanese-American singer
- Eugenia Paul, actress and model
- Gino Polidori, Michigan's 15th District representative
- Walter Reuther, president of United Auto Workers (UAW) 1946–1970, president of Congress of Industrial Organizations (CIO) 1952–1955; named to Time magazine's 100 most influential people of 20th century; I-696 freeway in Michigan and library at Wayne State University named after him
- Tom Saidock, defensive tackle at Michigan State University; played professionally for the Philadelphia Eagles (1957), New York Titans (1960–61), and Buffalo Bills (1962)
- Robert Saleh, former head coach of NFL's New York Jets; member of 2013 Super Bowl champion Seattle Seahawks
- Tarick Salmaci, boxer, also featured on reality TV show The Contender
- Martin Shakar (1957), stage, film, and TV actor, who has played on Broadway and Off-Broadway, and appeared in some television shows and more than fifteen films, including Saturday Night Fever (1977)
- Amir Siddiq, American gridiron football player
- Eddie Slovik, only American soldier to be executed for desertion since the American Civil War; executed during World War II
- Jim Snyder, played baseball for Minnesota Twins from 1961–1964; managed the Seattle Mariners in 1988
- Jerome Wiesner, president of Massachusetts Institute of Technology (MIT) 1971–1980 and science advisor to Presidents Dwight Eisenhower, John F. Kennedy and Lyndon B. Johnson
