= Dearborn High School =

High school in Dearborn, Wayne County, Michigan, US

Location
- 19501 Outer Drive; Dearborn, Michigan; US; 42.3083°N 83.2622°W

Information
- Type: Public
- Motto: Always in the Lead
- Established: 1893
- School district: Dearborn Public Schools
- Principal: Zeina Jebril
- Teaching staff: 91.30 (FTE)
- Grades: 9–12
- Enrollment: 1,882 (2023–2024)
- Student to teacher ratio: 20.61
- Colors: Orange; Black
- Mascot: Pioneers
- Rival: Edsel Ford, Fordson
- Yearbook: The Pioneer
- Affiliation: Kensington Lakes Activities Association
- Website: dhs.dearbornschools.org
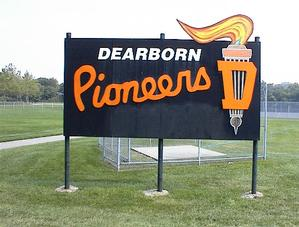
- The sign outside Dearborn High

Student assessments
- 2021-22 school year Change vs. prior year

M-STEP 11th grade proficiency rates (Science / Social Studies)
- Advanced %: 15.8 / 9.1
- Proficient %: 23.3 / 30.5
- PR. Proficient %: 14.2 / 44.4
- Not Proficient %: 46.8 / 16.0

Average test scores
- SAT Total: 969.6 (▼ −21.9)

Dearborn High School (DHS) is a public high school located in Dearborn, Michigan, United States. It was founded in 1893 in Dearborn near Metro Detroit. Dearborn High is one of the three high schools of the Dearborn Public Schools and is located at 19501 Outer Drive. Its attendance boundary includes sections of Dearborn and Dearborn Heights.

== History ==
The original 1893 high school building stood at the northeast corner of Mason Street and Garrison Avenue. An auditorium and gymnasium unit was added to the east of this structure in 1920. The 1893 building was razed in 1925, and a three-story 40-classroom structure, made for 900 students, was erected in its place. An addition of 10 classrooms was added as a north wing in 1950. Dearborn High School moved to its current location on Outer Drive in 1956. The Mason Street building was remodeled as the Ray H. Adams Junior High School, named for the superintendent of schools when the 1925 building was erected. The junior high school closed in 1985 and the building was again remodeled to become part of a modern high-scale office complex.

== Band and orchestra ==
Dearborn High School currently has five bands and one string orchestra.

The bands and orchestra have consistently received the highest ratings at the Michigan School Band and Orchestra Association Band and Orchestra Festival's for the past 22 years. They are ranked in the highest AA division. The groups play at local venues, as well as community events. The marching band has performed annually in the City of Dearborn's traditional Memorial Day Parade. In 2008, the marching band was invited and participated in the National Memorial Day Parade in Washington D.C. In March 2011, the marching band was invited and marched in Dublin, Ireland's St. Patrick's Day Parade and was honored as the Top Youth Band of the Parade. In the spring of 2013, the groups performed in New York City at Josie Robertson Plaza outside of Lincoln Center, the Trump Tower, and the Church of the Intercession in Harlem.

== Theater and drama program ==
The Dearborn High School Theater program is one of the oldest secondary level theater programs in the state of Michigan, and the oldest continuous theater program of any kind in the City of Dearborn. Dearborn High School is the home of International Thespian Troupe No. 586 which was chartered at the school in 1944. The program's most famous alumnus was the actor George Peppard (class of 1946).

Since 1994, the program has been honored with 10 consecutive nominations (2000–2010) to perform at the annual American High School Theater Festival as well as the prestigious International Thespian Festival, and has produced numerous State of Michigan Thespian Festival competition medalists.

== Sports ==
Dearborn High School is currently a member of the Kensington Lakes Activities Association. In school history, the Pioneers and Lady Pioneers have won a combined 11 state championships in five sports, with six of them coming in boys' swimming. In addition, they have won numerous conference, district, and state regional titles in every sport.

he school colors are orange and black; the Pioneer mascot is dressed as a mid-19th century frontiersman, wearing a coonskin hat with a brown leather jacket, pants, and boots with leather fringe. At one point, the mascot carried a 19th-century hunting rifle but that was ended by the administration in the late 1990s. Their previous football field was nicknamed "The Boneyard".

The Pioneers' biggest rivals are the Tractors from Dearborn's Fordson High School and the Thunderbirds of Dearborn's Edsel Ford . According to T. C. Cameron, author of Metro Detroit's High School Football Rivalries, the rivalry with Edsel Ford High "has always been spirited" and that Ford's teams "never pass on a chance" to challenge Dearborn High in games. In regards to the one with Fordson, he stated the games have been "scrubbed for years at a time" and that the rivalry was "love-to-hate". The rivalry was affected by the 2006 job change of Jeff Stergalas, previously the head coach at Fordson, into being an assistant coach at Dearborn High School. In 2015 both schools held food drives to coincide with the Dearborn–Ford football game.

== WDHS Student Video ==
WDHS Video is a video program fully run by students at Dearborn High School. The program was founded by Russ Gibb in 1981. Since 1999, it is the only program in the state of Michigan where students produce a feature-length film every school year. Students annually premiere the films at the Michael A. Guido Theater in Dearborn. In May 2014, the program won three student production awards from the Michigan Emmy Awards.

== Demographics ==
Dearborn High School's students mainly live in the oldest neighborhoods of Dearborn. Fordson High students perceive Dearborn High as being more affluent than Fordson. As of 2012, according to Rashid Ghazi, the producer and director of Fordson: Faith, Fasting, Football, about 30–35% of the students at Dearborn High were Arabs.

In 1990, the administration gave out a survey, developed by a journalism teacher and his students, to other students, asking about prejudices held against Arab Americans. Arleen Sorkin and Paul Slansky, authors of My Bad: The Apology Anthology, reported that the survey "created among students tensions that hadn't previously existed". Principal Ann Superko issued an apology after receiving criticism from leaders of the Arab American community as well as students and parents of that ethnic background.

== Notable alumni ==
- Jack Cassini, former MLB player (Pittsburgh Pirates)
- Bob Goodenow, executive director of the NHLPA
- Joseph M. Martin, four star general, Vice Chief of Staff of the United States Army from 2019–2022
- Nancy Milford, author and biographer
- George Peppard, actor, star of film Breakfast at Tiffany's and TV series Banacek and The A-Team
- Tom Price, Georgia congressman, United States Secretary of Health and Human Services
- Russ Reader, NFL football player
- T. R. Reid, Tokyo bureau chief and London bureau chief for the Washington Post; author of The Healing of America
- Mike Rucinski, NHL ice hockey player
- Soony Saad, MLS soccer player (2010–2011 NCAA soccer freshman of the year)
