= Western Lakes Activities Association =

Athletic conference

The Western Lakes Activities Association was an athletic conference for high schools located in western Wayne and southern Oakland Counties in Michigan from 1982 through 2007. The twelve schools of the WLAA merged with the Kensington Valley Conference, schools from the Oakland Activities Association, and newly opening schools to form the Kensington Lakes Activities Association in 2008.

== History ==
The WLAA was formed in 1982 from the merger of the Western Six Activities Association and the Inter-Lakes League, with two schools from the Suburban Eight League. The Western Six had lost Waterford Mott to the Greater Oakland Activities Association after 1980, while the Inter-Lakes League lost White Lake Lakeland to the Kensington Valley Conference, and Pontiac Northern did not field a team for 1981, leaving the ILL with four teams. Livonia Bentley and Plymouth-Salem came from the Suburban Eight to align themselves with more local rivals, including Livonia Churchill, Livonia Stevenson, and Plymouth-Canton. The extant school from the ILL, Waterford High School, joined Waterford Mott in the Greater Oakland conference before closing in 1983.

The initial roster of 10 schools was divided into two divisions, the Western and Lakes Divisions, and remained the same until 1985, when Livonia Bentley closed, and three schools joined from the Northwest Suburban League. The 1985 alignment remained the same through the 2001-02 school year.

In 2002, Farmington, North Farmington, and Harrison left for the Oakland Activities Association, and Wayne Memorial joined. In 2004, Walled Lake Northern and Plymouth joined the conference, bringing the WLAA to 12 teams for the remainder of its existence.

== Divisional Alignments ==
=== 1982-1984 ===
Western Division

- Farmington Harrison Hawks (from Western Six)
- Livonia Churchill Chargers (from Western Six)
- Northville Mustangs (from Western Six)
- Plymouth-Canton Chiefs (from Western Six)
- Walled Lake Western Warriors (from Western Six)

Lakes Division

- Farmington Falcons (from Inter-Lakes)
- Livonia Bentley Bulldogs (from Suburban Eight)
- Livonia Stevenson Spartans (from Inter-Lakes)
- Plymouth-Salem Rocks (from Suburban Eight)
- Walled Lake Central Vikings (from Inter-Lakes)

=== 1985-2001 ===
Western Division

- Farmington Harrison Hawks
- Livonia Churchill Chargers
- Livonia Franklin Patriots
- Northville Mustangs
- Plymouth-Canton Chiefs
- Walled Lake Western Warriors

Lakes Division

- Farmington Falcons
- Livonia Stevenson Spartans
- North Farmington Raiders
- Plymouth-Salem Rocks
- Walled Lake Central Vikings
- Westland John Glenn Rockets

Changes from 1984:

- Livonia Franklin, North Farmington, and Westland John Glenn join from the Northwest Suburban League
- Livonia Bentley closes

=== 2002-2003 ===
Western Division

- Canton Chiefs
- Livonia Churchill Chargers
- Livonia Franklin Patriots
- Northville Mustangs
- Walled Lake Western Warriors

Lakes Division

- Livonia Stevenson Spartans
- Salem Rocks
- Walled Lake Central Vikings
- Wayne Memorial Zebras
- Westland John Glenn Rockets

Changes from 2001:

- Farmington, North Farmington and Harrison leave and join the Oakland Activities Association
- Wayne Memorial joins from the Michigan Mega Conference
- Plymouth-Salem and Plymouth-Canton drop "Plymouth" from their names with the opening of the new Plymouth High School

=== 2004-2007 ===
Western Division

- Canton Chiefs
- Livonia Churchill Chargers
- Livonia Franklin Patriots
- Northville Mustangs
- Plymouth Wildcats
- Walled Lake Western Warriors

Lakes Division

- Livonia Stevenson Spartans
- Salem Rocks
- Walled Lake Central Vikings
- Walled Lake Northern Knights
- Wayne Memorial Zebras
- Westland John Glenn Rockets

Changes from 2003:

- Plymouth and Walled Lake Northern began play in 2004

Team	Location	Joined	Division	Previous Conference	Departed	Successive Conference
Farmington Harrison Hawks	Farmington Hills	1985	Western	Western Six Conference	2002	Oakland Activities Association
Livonia Churchill Chargers	Livonia	1985	Western	Western Six Conference	2008	Kensington Lakes Activities Association
Livonia Franklin Patriots	Livonia	1985	Western	Northwest Suburban League	2008	Kensington Lakes Activities Association
Northville Mustangs	Northville Township	1982	Western	Western Six Conference	2008	Kensington Lakes Activities Association
Plymouth-Canton Chiefs	Canton Township	1982	Western	Western Six Conference	2008	Kensington Lakes Activities Association
Plymouth Wildcats	Canton Township	2004	Western	None (school opened)	2008	Kensington Lakes Activities Association
Walled Lake Central Vikings	Commerce Township	1982	Western	Inter-Lakes Conference	2008	Kensington Lakes Activities Association
Walled Lake Western Warriors	Commerce Township	1982	Western	Western Six Conference	2008	Kensington Lakes Activities Association
Farmington Falcons	Farmington	1982	Lakes	Inter-Lakes Conference	2002	Oakland Activities Association
Livonia Bentley Bulldogs	Livonia	1982	Lakes	Suburban Eight Conference	1985	None (school closed)
Livonia Stevenson Spartans	Livonia	1982	Lakes	Inter-Lakes Conference	2008	Kensington Lakes Activities Association
North Farmington Raiders	Farmington Hills	1985	Lakes	Northwest Suburban League	2002	Oakland Activities Association
Plymouth-Salem Rocks	Canton Township	1982	Lakes	Suburban Eight Conference	2008	Kensington Lakes Activities Association
Walled Lake Northern Knights	Commerce Township	2004	Lakes	None (school opened)	2008	Kensington Lakes Activities Association
Wayne Memorial Zebras	Wayne	2002	Lakes	Michigan Mega Conference	2008	Kensington Lakes Activities Association
Westland John Glenn Rockets	Westland	1985	Lakes	Northwest Suburban League	2008	Kensington Lakes Activities Association
