= Janet Anderson (disambiguation) =

Janet Anderson (1949–2023) was a British politician.

Janet Anderson may also refer to:

- Janet Anderson (golfer) (born 1956), American golf player
- Janet M. Anderson (1949–1996), American commercial artist
- Janet Anderson (milliner) (1697–1761), Scottish milliner
- Janet Anderson Perkin (1921–2012), Canadian professional baseball player and curler

== See also ==
- Jan Anderson (disambiguation)
