= Kensington Lakes Activities Association =

High school athletic conference

The Kensington Lakes Activities Association (KLAA) is an athletic conference for high schools in Michigan. It was formed in the 2008-2009 school year as a result of the merger of the Kensington Valley Conference and the Western Lakes Activities Association, plus two other schools joining from the Oakland Activities Association and the newly built South Lyon East. The league started in 2008 with 23 teams. Howell Parker was to join the KLAA when the conference was first created, but closed after only one year of operation and later reopened as a middle school. Grand Blanc joined in 2009, bringing the league to 24 teams. The conference currently sits at 14 teams, split into two divisions with seven schools each.

== Member schools ==
=== Current members ===
Team	Location	Enrollment	Joined	Previous Conference
Black Division
Belleville Tigers	Belleville	1,701	2018	Western Wayne Athletic Conference
Canton Cobras	Canton Township	1,977	2008	Western Lakes Activities Association
Dearborn Fordson Tractors	Dearborn	2,756	2018	Western Wayne Athletic Conference
Northville Mustangs	Northville Township	2,500	2008	Western Lakes Activities Association
Novi Wildcats	Novi	2,070	2008	Kensington Valley Conference
Plymouth Wildcats	Canton Township	2,050	2008	Western Lakes Activities Association
Salem Rocks	Canton Township	2,019	2008	Western Lakes Activities Association
Gold Division
Brighton Bulldogs	Brighton	2,079	2008	Kensington Valley Conference
Dearborn Pioneers	Dearborn	2,115	2018	Western Wayne Athletic Conference
Crestwood High School	Dearborn Heights	1,272	2026	Western Wayne Athletic Conference
Hartland Eagles	Hartland Township	1,935	2008	Kensington Valley Conference
Howell Highlanders	Howell	2,200	2008	Kensington Valley Conference
Westland Glenn Rockets	Westland	1,665	2008	Western Lakes Activities Association
Wayne Memorial Zebras	Wayne	1,621	2008	Western Lakes Activities Association

=== Former members ===
Team	Location	Joined	Previous Conference	Departed	Successive Conference
Livonia Churchill Chargers	Livonia	2008	Western Lakes Activities Association	2026	Lakes Valley Conference
Livonia Franklin Patriots	Livonia	2008	Western Lakes Activities Association	2026	Lakes Valley Conference
Grand Blanc Bobcats	Grand Blanc	2009	Big Nine Conference	2018	Saginaw Valley League
Lakeland Eagles	White Lake Township	2008	Kensington Valley Conference	2017	Lakes Valley Conference
Milford Mavericks	Highland Township	2008	Kensington Valley Conference	2017	Lakes Valley Conference
Pinckney Pirates	Putnam Township	2008	Kensington Valley Conference	2017	Southeastern Conference
South Lyon Lions	South Lyon	2008	Kensington Valley Conference	2017	Lakes Valley Conference
South Lyon East Cougars	Lyon Township	2008	None (school opened)	2017	Lakes Valley Conference
Livonia Stevenson Spartans	Livonia	2008	Western Lakes Activities Association	2026	Lakes Valley Conference
Walled Lake Central Vikings	Commerce Township	2008	Western Lakes Activities Association	2017	Lakes Valley Conference
Walled Lake Northern Knights	Commerce Township	2008	Western Lakes Activities Association	2017	Lakes Valley Conference
Walled Lake Western Warriors	Commerce Township	2008	Western Lakes Activities Association	2017	Lakes Valley Conference
Waterford Kettering Captains	Waterford Township	2008	Oakland Activities Association	2017	Lakes Valley Conference
Waterford Mott Corsairs	Waterford Township	2008	Oakland Activities Association	2017	Lakes Valley Conference

=== Membership timeline ===
On March 13, 2017, Milford, South Lyon, South Lyon East, Walled Lake Central, Walled Lake Northern, Walled Lake Western, Waterford Kettering, Waterford Mott, and White Lake Lakeland announced plans to leave the KLAA to form a new conference entitled the Lakes Valley Conference, effective starting the 2017-2018 school year. Pinckney also left the KLAA in 2017 to join the Southeastern Conference. These departures prompted the KLAA to switch from a four-division system of North, South, West, and Central divisions to a two-division system of Black and Gold divisions, and later, East and West divisions.

The next day, on March 14, 2017, Grand Blanc was voted out of the KLAA effective for the 2018-2019 school year (due to how isolated it is from the other schools in the division) where it proceeded to join the Saginaw Valley League. In its place, Belleville, Dearborn, and Dearborn Fordson joined the KLAA in 2018.

In March 2025, it was announced that the three Livonia schools, Churchill, Franklin, and Stevenson, would leave the KLAA for the Lakes Valley Conference (along with the two high schools in Farmington from the Oakland Activities Association) starting in the 2026-27 academic year. The conference later announced the addition of Dearborn Crestwood as a replacement member following the rejection of a merger proposal with the aforementioned Southeastern Conference.

The following March, the Novi and Northville school districts announced simultaneously that they would be leaving the KLAA to join the Oakland Activities Association, starting in the 2027-28 academic year. This differed from the remaining 11 KLAA schools, who will all be moving to the Southeastern Conference.
