= Jan Anderson =

Jan Anderson or Andersson is the name of:

- Jan Anderson (scientist) (1932–2015), New Zealand-born plant scientist active in Australia
- Jan Andersson (politician) (born 1947), Swedish politician of the Social Democratic Workers' Party of Sweden
- Janne Andersson (born 1962), Swedish football coach
- Jan Andersson (footballer, born 1965), Swedish footballer
- Jan Andersson (sailor) (1950–2025), Swedish Olympic sailor
- Jan R. Andersson (born 1970), Swedish politician of the Moderate Party
- Jan Anderson (actress) (born 1974), Welsh actress
- Jan Inge Andersson (active 1960), Swedish footballer
- Jan Andersson (speedway rider) (born 1955), Swedish speedway rider
- Jan Andersson (Swedish Air Force officer) (born 1955), Swedish Air Force major general

== See also ==
- Jan Frode Andersen (born 1972), Norwegian tennis player
- Ian Anderson (disambiguation)
- Janet Anderson (disambiguation)
