= Holmes Middle School =

Holmes Middle School can refer to:

- Holmes Middle School (Colorado Springs, Colorado)
- Holmes Middle School (Livonia, Michigan)
- Holmes Middle School (Fairfax County, Virginia)
