= Sista =

Sista may refer to:

- "Sister", spelled in eye dialect
- Sista River, a river in Russia's Leningrad Oblast which drains into Koporye Bay
- Sista Monica Parker (1956–2014), an American musician
- La Sista, a Puerto Rican reggaeton artist
- Sista Otis, an American musician
- Sista, a 1994 album by Swing Mob
- "Sista", a song by the John Butler Trio from their 2003 live album Living 2001–2002
- Sista, an American R&B female quartet who recorded the 1994 album 4 All the Sistas Around da World

== See also ==
- "Sista Sista", a 1998 song by Beverley Knight
- Sister Souljah (born 1964), an American activist
- Systa, a 1994 album by American hip hop duo Terri & Monica
