= Harper Woods High School =

Coordinates: 42.4443°N 82.9348°W

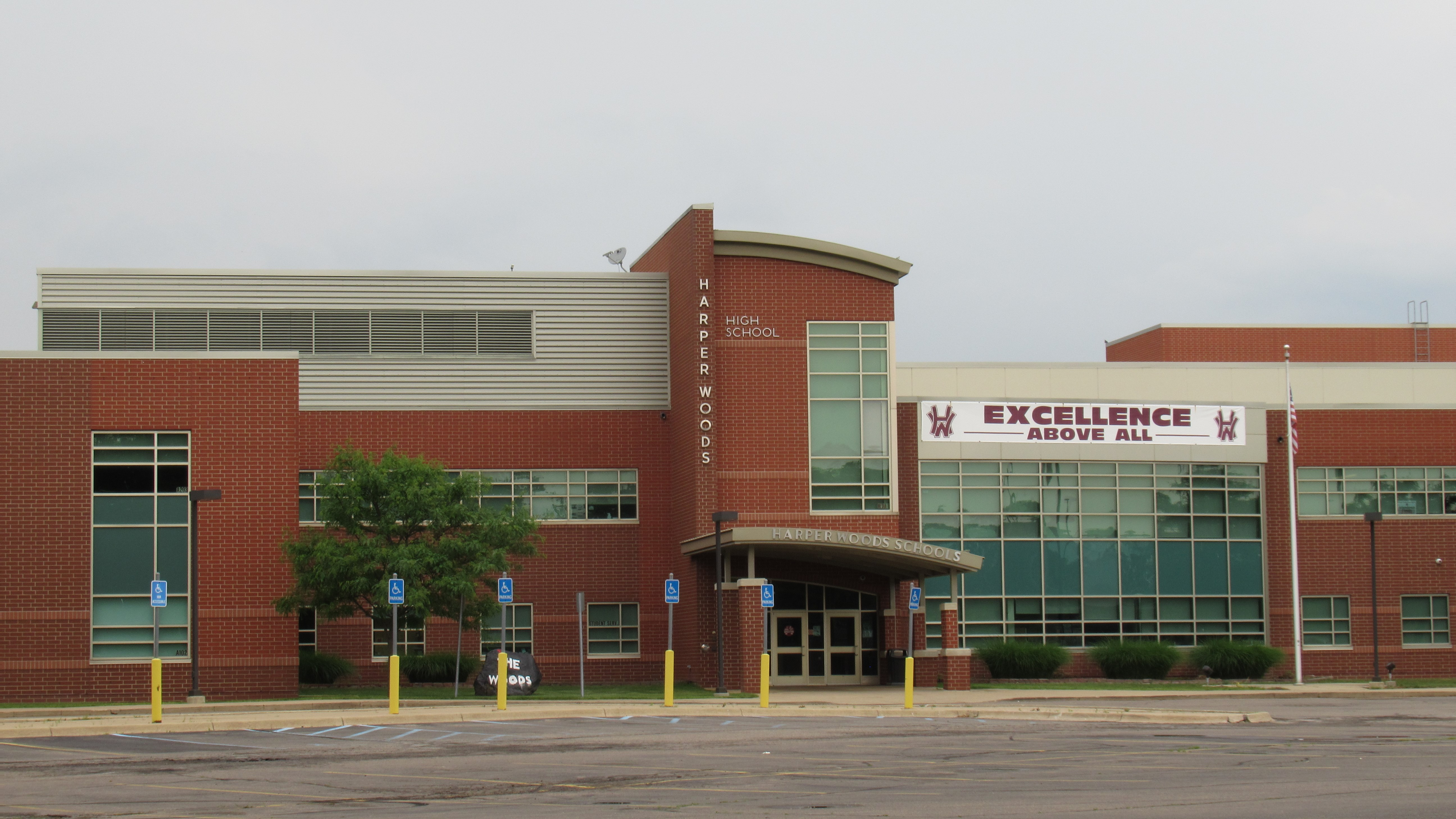

Location
- 20225 Beaconsfield Street; Harper Woods, (Wayne County), Michigan 48225; United States

Information
- Type: Public high school
- Principal: Dr. Treyvon Harlin
- Staff: 36.00 (FTE)
- Enrollment: 878 (2023-2024)
- Student to teacher ratio: 24.39
- Colors: Maroon and white
- Athletics conference: Oakland Activities Association
- Nickname: Pioneers
- Website: https://www.hwschools.org/high-school/about

Harper Woods High School is a public high school in Harper Woods, Michigan in Metro Detroit. It is a part of the Harper Woods School District.

Harper Woods High Schools was founded in 1951.

The current facility, which housed both middle school and high school levels, opened circa 2007. It was scheduled to be used as a filming site for the 2012 film Red Dawn.

As of 2014 the campus had fewer than 700 students in the middle and high school levels.

Starting in the 2018–2019 school year only the high school was housed at this building, the Middle School relocating to space on the Triumph Church East Campus.
