= Ian Anderson (disambiguation) =

Ian Anderson (born 1947) is a British musician, best known as the leader of the rock band Jethro Tull.

Ian Anderson may also refer to:

== Arts and entertainment ==
- Ian A. Anderson (born 1947), English folk musician and editor of fRoots magazine
- Ian M. Anderson (born 1985), American entrepreneur, founder of Afternoon Records
- Ian Lloyd Anderson (born 1987), Irish actor
- Ian R. Anderson, vocalist of UK bands Crazyhead and The Scavengers
- Ian Anderson, founder of the British design studio The Designers Republic

== Sports ==
- Ian Anderson (New Zealand cricketer) (1922–1977), New Zealand cricketer
- Ian Anderson (South African cricketer) (born 1935), South African cricketer
- Ian Anderson (snooker player) (born 1946), Australian snooker player
- Ian Anderson (Australian footballer) (born 1948), Australian rules footballer
- Ian Anderson (Scottish footballer) (1954–2008), Scottish football defender
- Ian Anderson (baseball) (born 1998), American baseball player

== Others ==
- Ian Anderson (Manx politician) (1925–2005), Manx (Isle of Man) politician and president of the Legislative Council
- Ian Anderson (British politician) (1953–2011), British National Front leader
- Ian Anderson (social scientist) (born 1965), Australian academic and senior public servant

== See also ==
- Iain Anderson (disambiguation)
- Jan Anderson (disambiguation)
