= Berkley High School =

High school in Michigan, United States

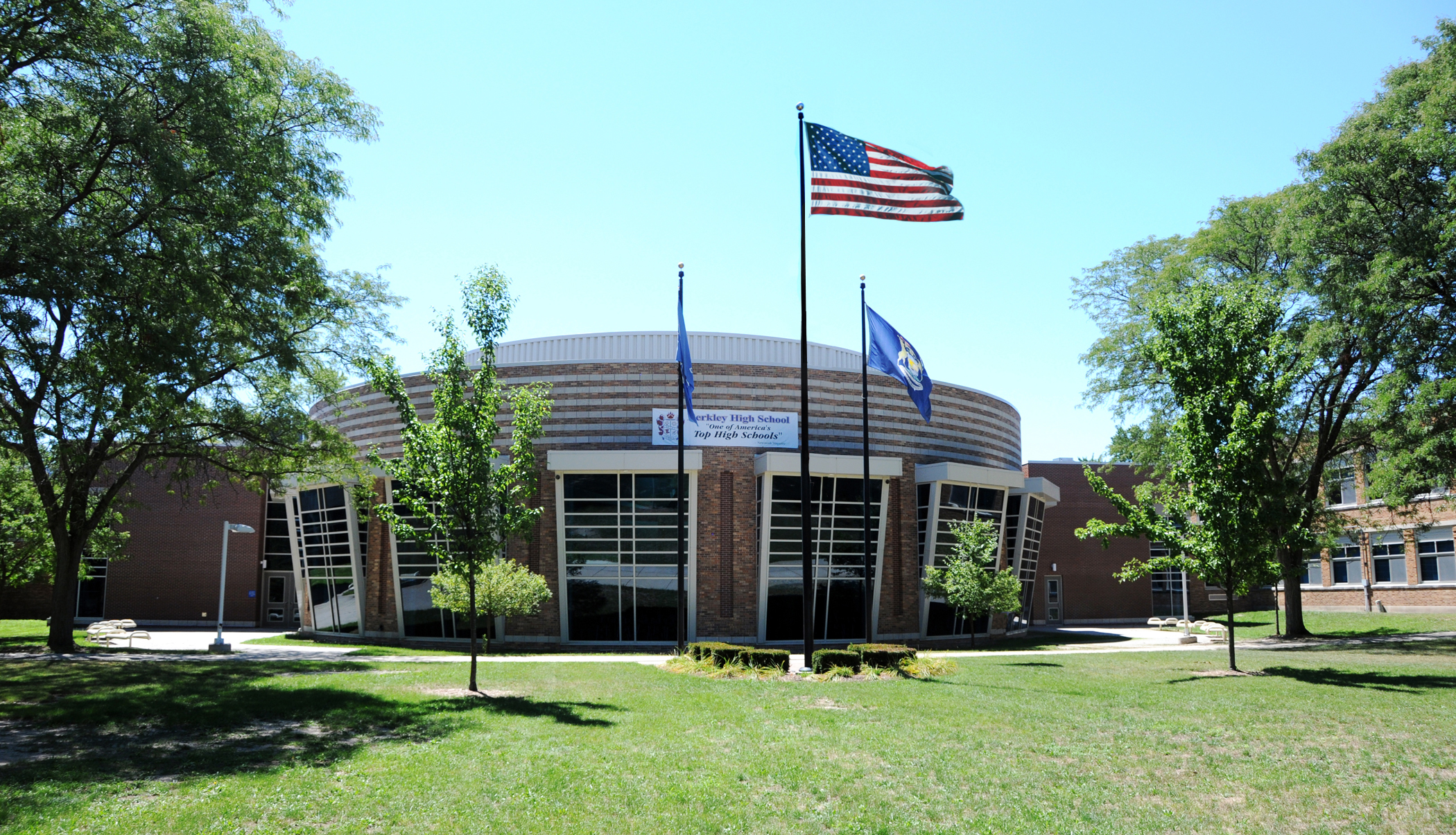

Location
- 2325 Catalpa Drive; Berkley, Michigan 48072; United States; 42°29′44″N 83°10′50″W

Information
- Type: Public high school
- Motto: A community of leaders building successful tomorrow's
- Established: 1922; Current high school 1948; expanded 1949, 1955, 1961, 1975, 1987, 2003, and 2016-2017
- School district: Berkley School District
- Principal: Andrew Meloche
- Teaching staff: 68.57 (on FTE basis)
- Grades: 9 - 12
- Enrollment: 1,193 (as of 2023-2024)
- Student to teacher ratio: 17.40
- Colors: Maroon and blue
- Athletics conference: Oakland Activities Association
- Team name: Bears
- Newspaper: The Spectator
- Yearbook: Bear Tracks
- Website: bhs.berkleyschools.org

Student assessments
- 2021–2022 school year Change vs. prior year

M-STEP 11th grade proficiency rates (Science / Social Studies)
- Advanced %: 25.1 / 20.4
- Proficient %: 37.8 / 38.0
- PR. Proficient %: 12.4 / 0.0
- Not Proficient %: 24.7 / ≤5

Average test scores
- SAT Total: 1045.2 (▼ −28.3)

Berkley High School is a public high school in Berkley, Michigan.

Berkley High's colors are maroon and blue and the school's mascot is a bear. Their newspaper is The Spectator, which is a member of the High School National Ad Network.

Originally established in 1922, the first Berkley High building was housed within Berkley Elementary, across the street from the present building. It was demolished in 1980. The current BHS campus opened in 1948 with 8 classrooms, and has expanded several times since. In 1949 and 1955 more wings were constructed.

Overcrowding reached a crisis in 1957 and the district proposed replacing the high school with a new building at the southwest corner of Greenfield Road and Catalpa. The high school's original architect drew up new plans. When voters in the district rejected this plan, the district requested bond issues to build extensive additions to the school. Voters approved of an addition but rejected a pool and auditorium.

1961 saw the opening of this third wing, which contained 18 new classrooms, media center, cafeteria and two music rooms. In 1975 the Loren Disbrow Athletic Complex was added which included a new larger gym which serves as the Bears' basketball arena. In 1987 the 800-seat Berkley Auditorium was opened as a hub for the schools many performing arts. 2003 brought the addition of the collaborative center which serves as a multi-purpose space. A major renovation occurred in 2016 and 2017 where the school was updated with new technology and building systems and a new main office vestibule.

Berkley High School has been accredited by the Michigan North Central Association Commission on Accreditation and School Improvement since the 1928–29 school year.

As of the 2012–13 school year, the school had an enrollment of 1,250 students and 74.6 classroom teachers (on an FTE basis), for a student-teacher ratio of 18.1.

Berkley High School was named to Newsweek's 2013 list of 2,000 Best High Schools in the nation—ranked 22nd in Michigan. This ranking highlights the schools that have proven to be the most effective in turning out college-ready graduates. BHS has been on the Newsweek Best High Schools list since 2008.

== Performing arts ==
Berkley High School is home to a variety of musical ensembles. The wind ensembles are made up of the BHS Marching Band, Symphonic Band, Concert Band, and Jazz Band. Marching Band is only the first semester, and Symphonic Band takes its place second semester. Jazz band is also available for students. In January 2009 and again in 2013, the Symphony Orchestra took first place at the Presidential Inaugural (Heritage Festival). BHS also has four choirs: Concert Choir, Encore!, Belle Tones, and A Cappella. All students from these organizations are able to collaborate through BHS' Musical National Honor Society, known as Tri-M. In May 2007, the Berkley High School A Cappella choir was invited to New York City where they performed Beethoven's Mass in C Major in New York City's Carnegie Hall. In May 2013, the Berkley High School Symphony Orchestra and A Cappella Choir performed the American premiere of "My Name is Anne Frank" a cantata. In addition to the musical ensembles, BHS also has a drama program that is directed by John Hopkins.

== Sports ==
Berkley's athletic teams currently compete in the Oakland Activities Association (OAA) with the exception of the rugby teams (club) and the junior varsity hockey team (Southeast Michigan Prep Hockey League).

Although the school nickname is "The Bears," the boys' and girls' swimming and diving teams are known as the "Bearracudas" or "Cudas."

The Berkley football team, soccer teams, and track & field teams compete at Hurley Field, at Anderson Middle School. The softball teams play at the two neighboring fields located south of Pop Lewis field. The tennis courts are also next to Hurley Field. Berkley Varsity Hockey and JV/Prep Hockey competed at the Berkley Ice Arena,

== Robotics ==
Berkley High School's FIRST Robotics Competition team, Team 247, is known as "Da Bears". Established in 1999, it competes in the FIRST in Michigan district.

== Notable alumni ==
- Curtis Armstrong, (born 1953), Class of 1972, actor, best known for his role as "Booger" in the 1984 hit comedy movie Revenge of the Nerds
- Andy Bobrow, television comedy writer and producer, Community, Malcolm in the Middle, The Last Man on Earth.
- Bill Bonds, Detroit TV anchorman
- Marshall Crenshaw, (born 1953), Class of 1971, singer-songwriter
- Electric Six, band, original members from BHS
- Bruce Flowers, All-American high school basketball player, followed Notre Dame college career with brief NBA season with Cleveland.
- Robert Gosselin, (born 1951), former member of the Michigan House of Representatives.
- Steven Horwitz, (1964–2021), Class of 1981, economist and author
- Jill Jack, (born 1963), Class of 1981, singer-songwriter
- Rachel Jacobs, CEO of tech company, killed in 2015 train accident
- Don Kirkwood, (born 1949), former Major League Baseball player
- Andy Levin, (born 1960), United States Congressman
- Andy Meisner, (born 1973), Class of 1991, treasurer of Oakland County
- Aric Morris, (born 1977), football player, followed Michigan State University by playing for the NFL's Tennessee Titans and New England Patriots.
- Dick Radatz, (1937–2005), All-Star relief pitcher for the Boston Red Sox and other teams from 1962 to 1969
- Robert Wittenberg, (born 1980), member, Michigan House of Representatives
- Gary Yourofsky, (born 1970), militant animal rights activist
