= Bentley High School (Livonia, Michigan) =

Location
- 15100 Hubbard Street; Livonia, Michigan 48154; United States
- Coordinates: 42°23′37″N 83°21′39″W

Information
- Type: Public high school
- Opened: September 1947
- Closed: June 1985
- School district: Livonia Public Schools
- Principal: Dr. Kenneth Watson
- Grades: 9–12
- Colors: Dark Green and White
- Athletics conference: Suburban Six (1951-1971); Suburban Eight (1971-1982); Western Lakes Activities Association (1982-1985)
- Team name: Bulldogs
- Newspaper: Echo (through 1976–77 school year); Bulldog Edition (1977–1985)
- Yearbook: Pioneer
- Accreditation: North Central Association

George N. Bentley Senior High School, also referred to as Bentley High School, was a public high school in the city of Livonia, Michigan, a western suburb of Detroit. The first public high school in the Livonia Public Schools district, it was open from September 1947 through June 1985. The school's first graduating class in June 1950 had 95 students. The school closed because of low enrollment.

== History ==
=== Beginnings ===
Before the school was built, high school students in the district attended either Redford Union High School in Redford Township or Plymouth High School in nearby Plymouth. Because the community was growing, the decision was made in 1945 to build a high school in the city. Most in the community wanted to call the school Livonia High School, but it was eventually named after George N. Bentley, a former student at Elm Elementary School in the district and a school board member at the time of the school's groundbreaking in 1946. The original two-story building also housed seventh and eighth graders during the first few years of operation. As the population of Livonia grew during the 1950s, the school required expansion. During the 1950s, two wings, a gymnasium, an auto shop area, a pool, an auditorium, and a multi-purpose room were added to the school.

=== 1960s ===
Because of continued growth in the district (approximately 2,500 students per year district-wide), the ground was broken for a second high school named Franklin High School, which opened in the 1962-63 school year. During the 1961–62 school year, over 600 Franklin High School sophomores shared Bentley High School with the school operating on a dual schedule: Franklin teachers and students began classes later than the Bentley students. During the 1960s, the school underwent additional expansion as another wing, a library, addition to cafeteria, music rooms, and home economics classrooms were added.

During the 1965-66 school year, Bentley shared the building with the first graduating class of Stevenson High School while it was being built. Stevenson students attended classes on a later schedule than the Bentley students.

=== 1970s and 1980s ===
The 1970s started with strong and steady enrollment, peaking during the 1974–75 school year (the school district itself actually peaked in enrollment during the 1970–71 school year). As the decade progressed and the Detroit economy experienced a downturn, the school and district were losing students rapidly. By the early 1980s, the district had lost 51% of its peak enrollment. A freshman class was added to Bentley High School for the 1979-80 school year, the first ninth-grade class in over 20 years.

Faced with operating four public high schools and shrinking enrollment, the Board decided to close a high school. Bentley was the obvious choice as it was the oldest facility, its operational costs were the highest, and major renovations were needed for the entire building. The decision to close the school was announced in May 1983 and the school finally closed with the graduation of its final class in June 1985. All remaining underclassmen were distributed among the other three public high schools based on residential proximity to each school.

== After closure ==
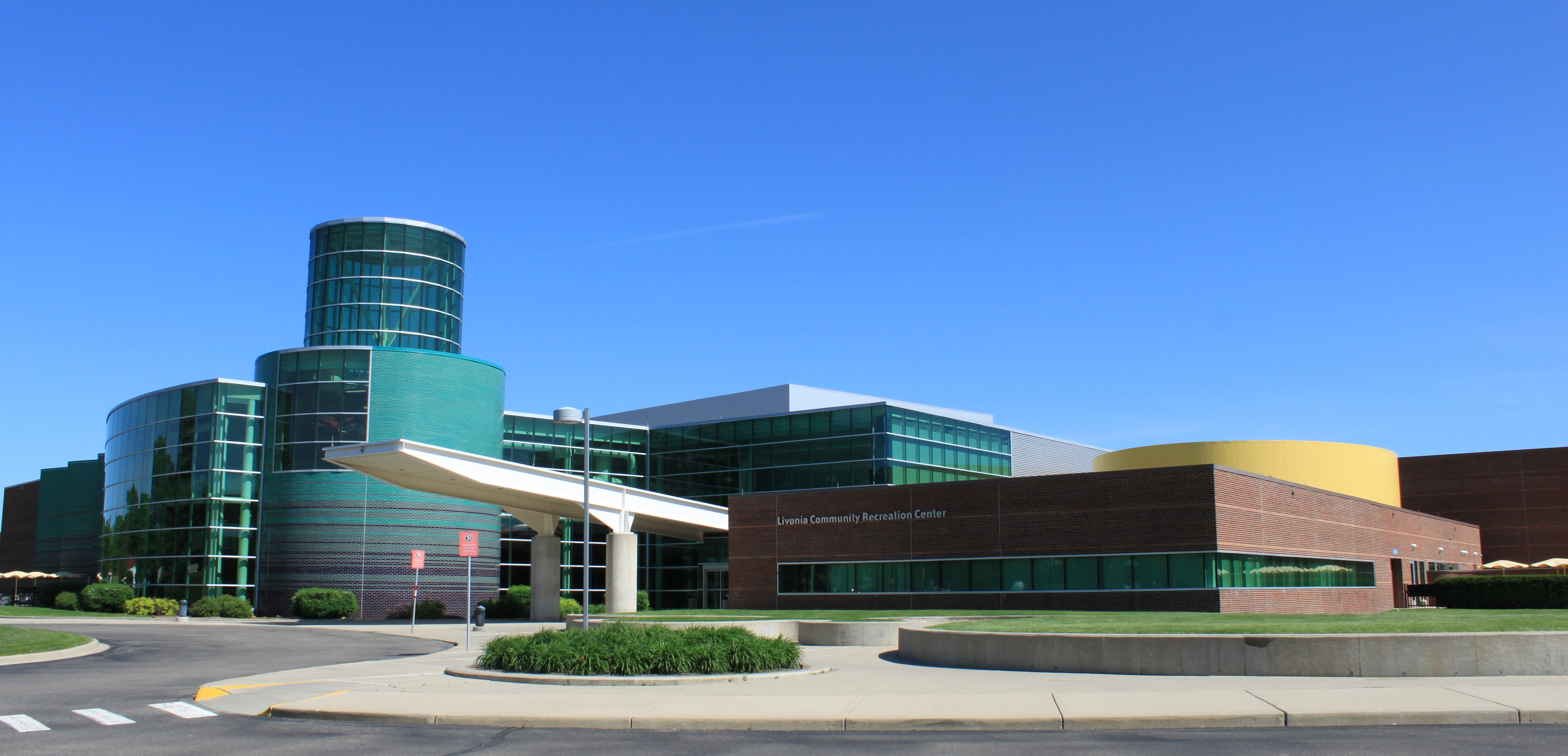
Livonia Community Recreation Center

After the school closed, the building and facilities were used for adult education, youth sports, and community groups. Most of the building was demolished in 1998, removing roughly 70% of the structure. The remainder was still used for adult education until the rest of the school was demolished in 2001. The Livonia Recreation Center, which was built on the site, opened its doors in 2003. A senior lounge in the new building is dedicated to preserving the memory of Bentley High School. Keepsakes in the room include pictures of the school, the midcourt of the former gymnasium floor, and composite photos of all graduating classes of Bentley High School. The Bentley track and field was also preserved for use by Livonia sports teams, as was the baseball diamond, which was last used by Madonna University but currently sits idle.

== Notable alumni ==
- Al Iafrate: National Hockey League (Class of 1984)
