= Oakland Activities Association =

High school athletics conference in Michigan, US

Oakland Activities Association is a Southeast Michigan high school athletics conference. In the 2027-28 school year, it will have 26 member schools largely located throughout Oakland County, with a single member located in Wayne County, and its two newest members located in southern Genesee County.

== History ==
The Oakland Activities Association was first formed with schools from an amalgamation of different leagues. The G.O.A.L. (Greater Oakland Activities League), Metro Suburban Activities Association and the Southeastern Michigan Association (plus one independently associated school) were all merged in 1994 into the Oakland Activities Association, with the goal being to form a more geographically-centered league.

=== Charter members ===
Founding Members
Previous league	School
Greater Oakland Activities League	Clarkston, Lake Orion, Pontiac Northern, Waterford Kettering, Waterford Mott
Metro Suburban Activities Association	Birmingham Groves, Bloomfield Hills Lahser, Rochester, Rochester Adams, Royal Oak Dondero, Southfield-Lathrup, Troy Athens, West Bloomfield
Southeastern Michigan Association	Berkley, Birmingham Seaholm, Bloomfield Hills Andover, Ferndale, Hazel Park, Royal Oak Kimball, Southfield, Troy
Independent	Ortonville Brandon

After its first year, the OAA experienced rapid growth, with Pontiac Central from the Saginaw Valley Association and Oak Park from the Suburban Athletic League joining in 1995, and Auburn Hills Avondale, Clawson, Madsion Heights Lamphere, and Madison Heights Madison all coming to the OAA in 1996 after the disbandment of the Macomb-Oakland Athletic Conference.

The next major growth period did not occur until 2002, when Farmington, North Farmington, and Farmington Hills Harrison from the Western Lakes Activities Association as well as the newly built Stoney Creek High School in Rochester Hills all joined the OAA.

2002 also marked a period of decline for the OAA, beginning with Brandon High leaving to join the Flint Metro League, where it currently resides in. Two years after that, in 2004, Madison and Lamphere left to join the Macomb Area Conference, while Clawson left to join the Metro Conference, and in 2008, Waterford Mott and Waterford Kettering left to join the Kensington Lakes Activities Association. However, in 2010, the OAA gained a new member in Oxford, who had come from the Flint Metro League. After that, the next school to leave the OAA for another conference did not come for another 11 years, when Hazel Park left to join the Macomb Area Conference in 2019.

However, the OAA has been beginning to fill these holes in their membership, extending an invitation to Ferndale University in 2020, who had been co-oping with Ferndale for football for years, and extending another invitation to their first non-Oakland County school in Harper Woods, who was previously an independent, in 2021.

There have also been a significant number of closings and consolidations of various Oakland County schools in recent years, which has also not helped the OAA's membership. These aforementioned consolidations are Dondero High School closing and merging with Kimball High School to create Royal Oak High School in 2006, Pontiac Central High School closing and merging with Pontiac Northern High School to create Pontiac High School in 2009, Lahser High School closing and merging with Andover High School to create Bloomfield Hills High School in 2013, Southfield-Lathrup High School closing and merging with Southfield High School to create Southfield Senior High School for the Arts and Technology (commonly abbreviated to Southfield A&T) in 2016, and Harrison High School closing in 2019.

In 2027/2028, Grand Blanc High School, Davison High School, Northville High School and Novi High School are set to join the OAA.

== Member schools ==
=== Current members ===
School	Nickname	Location	Colors	Enrollment (as of 2019)	Class	Joined
Clarkston	Wolves	Clarkston	Blue and Gold	2,499	A	1994
Troy	Colts	Troy	Silver and Black	2,237	A	1994
Troy Athens	Red Hawks	Troy	Red and Gold	2,276	A	1994
Rochester Hills Stoney Creek	Cougars	Rochester Hills	Vegas Gold and Millennium Blue	1,638	A	2001
Lake Orion	Dragons	Orion Township	Green and White	2,416	A	1994
Pontiac	Phoenix	Pontiac	Purple, Black, and Silver	963	A	2009
Rochester	Falcons	Rochester	Royal Blue and White	1,805	A	1994
West Bloomfield	Lakers	West Bloomfield Township	Green and White	2,042	A	1994
Bloomfield Hills	Black Hawks	Bloomfield Township	Black, Purple, and Silver	1,896	A	2014
Oak Park	Knights	Oak Park	Red, White, and Black	1,276	A	1995
Southfield A&T	Warriors	Southfield	Red, White, and Blue	2,067	A	2016
Birmingham Groves	Falcons	Beverly Hills	Yellow, White, and Green	1,310	A	1994
Oxford	Wildcats	Oxford	Navy and Gold	2,234	A	2004
Rochester Adams	Highlanders	Rochester	Brown and Gold	1,710	A	1994
North Farmington	Raiders	Farmington Hills	Brown and Gold	1,371	A	2001
Birmingham Seaholm	Maples	Birmingham	Maroon and White	1,370	A	1994
Royal Oak	Ravens	Royal Oak	Black, Royal, and Silver	1,405	A	2006
Farmington	Falcons	Farmington	Blue and White	1,444	A	2002
Berkley	Bears	Berkley	Maroon and Blue	1,424	A	1994
Auburn Hills Avondale	Yellow Jackets	Auburn Hills	Purple and Gold	1,133	A	1996
Harper Woods	Pioneers	Harper Woods	Maroon, White, and Gray	835	A	2021
Ferndale	Eagles	Ferndale	Brown, White, and Gold	717	B	1994
Ferndale University*	Driving Eagles	Ferndale	Gold and Black	478	B	2020

*- Ferndale University is involved in a co-op agreement with Ferndale for football

=== Former members ===
School	Nickname	Location	Joined	Previous Conference	Departed	Successive Conference
Bloomfield Hills Andover	Barons	Bloomfield Township	1994	Southeastern Michigan Association	2013	None (school consolidated)
Bloomfield Hills Lahser	Knights	Bloomfield Hills	1994	Metro Suburban Activities Association	2013	None (school closed)
Clawson	Trojans	Clawson	1996	Macomb-Oakland Athletic Conference	2004	Metro Conference
Farmington Hills Harrison	Hawks	Farmington Hills	2002	Western Lakes Activities Association	2019	None (school closed)
Hazel Park	Vikings	Hazel Park	1994	Southeastern Michigan Association	2019	Macomb Area Conference
Madison Heights Lamphere	Rams	Madison Heights	1996	Macomb-Oakland Athletic Conference	2004	Macomb Area Conference
Madison Heights Madison	Eagles	Madison Heights	1996	Macomb-Oakland Athletic Conference	2004	Macomb Area Conference
Ortonville Brandon	Blackhawks	Ortonville	1994	Independent	2002	Flint Metro League
Pontiac Central	Chiefs	Pontiac	1995	Saginaw Valley League	2009	None (school closed)
Pontiac Northern	Huskies	Pontiac	1994	Greater Oakland Activities League	2009	None (school consolidated)
Royal Oak Dondero	Oaks	Royal Oak	1994	Metro Suburban Activities Association	2006	None (school closed)
Royal Oak Kimball	Knights	Royal Oak	1994	Southeastern Michigan Association	2006	None (school consolidated)
Southfield	Warriors	Southfield	1994	Southeastern Michigan Association	2016	None (school consolidated)
Southfield-Lathrup	Chargers	Lathrup Village	1994	Metro Suburban Activities Association	2016	None (school closed)
Waterford Kettering	Captains	Waterford Township	1994	Greater Oakland Activities League	2008	Kensington Lakes Activities Association
Waterford Mott	Corsairs	Waterford Township	1994	Greater Oakland Activities League	2008	Kensington Lakes Activities Association

=== Future Members ===
School	Nickname	Location	Current Conference	Set to Join
Northville	Mustangs	Northville Township	Kensington Lakes Activities Association	2027
Novi	Wildcats	Novi	Kensington Lakes Activities Association	2027
Grand Blanc	Bobcats	Grand Blanc	SVL South	2027
Davison	Cardinals	Davison	SVL South	2027

=== Membership timeline ===
Full members Full members (non-football)

== OAA Divisions ==
The members of the Oakland Activities Association is divided into divisions which vary by sport. Before 2007, these divisions were labeled after Roman Numerals, with there typically being three divisions, labeled I, II, III, and occasionally a fourth, labeled IV. Nowadays, though, these divisions are labeled after colors, with most sports typically having three divisions: red, white, and blue. However, some sports are only divided into the red or white divisions while some are divided into a fourth division, gold.

Football Divisions (as of 2021)
Red	White	Blue
Clarkston	Adams	Athens
Lake Orion	Groves	Avondale
Oxford	North Farmington	Berkley
Southfield A&T	Oak Park	Bloomfield Hills
Stoney Creek	Rochester	Farmington
West Bloomfield	Seaholm	Ferndale
		Pontiac
		Royal Oak
		Troy

== OAA Football Divisional Champions ==
Division I (1994-2006)/Red Division (2007-) Champions
Year	School	Division	Overall
1994	Troy	5-0	12-1
1995	Troy	5-0	9-2
1996	Clarkston	6-0	9-1
1997	Troy	6-0	10-1
1998	Lake Orion; Rochester Adams; Troy	4-1; 4-1; 4-1	10-2; 9-2; 9-2
1999	Clarkston	4-1	11-2
2000	Clarkston	6-0	12-1
2001	Rochester Adams	6-0	10-1
2002	Farmington Hills Harrison; Lake Orion; Rochester Adams	6-1; 6-1; 6-1	8-3; 9-2; 8-2
2003	Farmington Hills Harrison	7-0	11-2
2004	Rochester Adams	8-0	12-1
2005	Rochester Adams	8-0	12-1
2006	Lake Orion	8-0	10-1
2007	Clarkston	8-0	9-2
2008	Lake Orion	7-0	12-2
2009	Clarkston	7-0	12-1
2010	Lake Orion	7-0	13-1
2011	Clarkston; Lake Orion	6-1; 6-1	7-4; 6-4
2012	Clarkston	7-0	11-1
2013	Clarkston	7-0	13-1
2014	Clarkston	7-0	14-0
2015	West Bloomfield	7-0	9-1
2016	Clarkston; Southfield A&T	5-1; 5-1	9-3; 8-4
2017	Rochester Adams; West Bloomfield	6-1; 6-1	9-2; 11-3
2018	Clarkston	5-1	11-3
2019	West Bloomfield	6-0	10-2
2020	Clarkston	5-0	8-1

Division II (1994-2006)/White Division (2007-) Champions
Year	School	Division	Overall
1994	Lake Orion	4-0	7-3
1995	Pontiac Central	5-0	10-2
1996	Berkley	6-0	8-2
1997	Birmingham Seaholm	6-1	10-2
1998	Waterford Kettering	6-0	7-2
1999	Berkley; Waterford Mott	5-1; 5-1	6-4; 6-4
2000	Birmingham Groves	6-0	8-2
2001	Royal Oak Kimball	6-0	9-2
2002	Birmingham Seaholm	6-1	8-3
2003	Birmingham Groves	6-1	7-4
2004	Southfield	8-0	9-1
2005	Birmingham Seaholm	7-1	8-3
2006	Royal Oak	7-1	8-3
2007	Rochester Adams	7-0	11-2
2008	Rochester Adams	7-0	8-2
2009	Rochester Adams	7-0	8-3
2010	Farmington Hills Harrison	7-0	14-0
2011	Farmington Hills Harrison	7-0	10-1
2012	Oak Park	6-1	9-3
2013	Southfield	7-0	7-3
2014	Farmington Hills Harrison; Oak Park; Southfield	6-1; 6-1; 6-1	10-3; 8-3; 9-4
2015	Farmington Hills Harrison	7-0	7-3
2016	Birmingham Groves	6-0	11-2
2017	Birmingham Groves; Farmington Hills Harrison; Oak Park	6-1; 6-1; 6-1	7-3; 10-4; 9-3
2018	Oak Park	6-0	9-2
2019	Oak Park	6-0	8-2
2020	Stoney Creek	5-0	7-1

Division III (1994-2006)/Blue Division (2007-) Champions
Year	School	Division	Overall
1994	Royal Oak Kimball	4-0	10-2
1995	Royal Oak Kimball	5-0	10-1
1996	Ferndale	6-0	10-1
1997	Birmingham Groves	6-0	8-3
1998	Birmingham Groves; Ortonville Brandon; Pontiac Northern	5-1; 5-1; 5-1	7-2; 6-3; 7-3
1999	Pontiac Northern	6-0	9-3
2000	Birmingham Seaholm; Ortonville Brandon; Southfield	5-1; 5-1; 5-1	9-3; 9-2; 7-3
2001	Birmingham Seaholm	6-0	11-1
2002	Farmington; North Farmington	5-1; 5-1	10-2; 6-3
2003	Farmington	6-0	8-2
2004	Auburn Hills Avondale; Bloomfield Hills Andover; Bloomfield Hills Lahser	8-1; 8-1; 8-1	8-2; 10-2; 9-2
2005	Bloomfield Hills Lahser	9-0	12-1
2006	Rochester Hills Stoney Creek	8-0	8-2
2007	Rochester Hills Stoney Creek; Waterford Mott	7-1; 7-1	8-2; 7-3
2008	Bloomfield Hills Lahser	8-0	11-2
2009	Hazel Park; Pontiac	6-1; 6-1	8-3; 7-3
2010	Hazel Park	8-0	8-2
2011	Birmingham Groves; North Farmington	6-2; 6-2	6-4; 7-3
2012	Birmingham Seaholm	8-0	8-2
2013	Birmingham Seaholm	7-0	9-2
2014	Farmington	7-0	7-3
2015	Birmingham Groves	7-0	10-1
2016	Bloomfield Hills	6-0	9-1
2017	Auburn Hills Avondale; Ferndale; Hazel Park	5-1; 5-1; 5-1	6-4; 8-2; 6-4
2018	Birmingham Seaholm	6-0	7-3
2019	North Farmington	6-0	9-1
2020	Rochester	6-0	6-1

Division IV Champions
Year	School	Division	Overall
1994	Birmingham Groves	4-0	5-4
1995	Hazel Park	5-0	7-2
1996	Ortonville Brandon	6-0	9-1
1997	Ortonville Brandon	6-0	10-1
1998	Oak Park	7-0	8-2
1999	Clawson	6-1	7-4
2000	Bloomfield Hills Andover	6-0	6-4
2001	Auburn Hills Avondale; Bloomfield Hills Andover	5-1; 5-1	5-4; 7-3
2002	Bloomfield Hills Lahser	7-0	12-1
2003	Bloomfield Hills Lahser	7-0	9-2
