= Jonathan B. Wright =

American actor (born 1986)

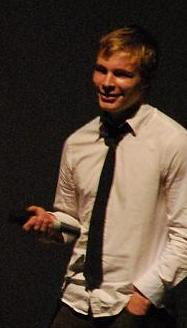
- Wright in 2008
- Born: Jonathan Bradford Wright; December 13, 1986 (age 39); Livonia, Michigan, U.S.
- Occupation: Actor
- Years active: 2001–present

Jonathan Bradford Wright (born December 13, 1986) is an American actor who is best known for his performance as Hänschen in the Tony Award-winning Broadway musical Spring Awakening.

== Life and career ==
Wright began acting at the age of 14 at the Creative And Performing Arts magnet program (CAPA) located at Winston Churchill High School in Livonia, Michigan. While at CAPA, Wright was cast in several productions, including:

- You Can't Take It with You – Ed Carmichael
- Stage Door – Adolph Gretzel
- A Midsummer Night's Dream – Snug
- Les Misérables – Bishop and Montparnasse
- Dancing at Lughnasa – Michael Evans
- Li'l Abner – Abner
- A Piece of My Heart – Ensemble
- Into the Woods – The Baker
- A Streetcar Named Desire – Stanley Kowalski
- The Crucible – Reverend John Hale
- Macbeth – Macduff

Wright won a prestigious scholarship to the Cranbrook Summer Theater in his junior year of high school, where he played Romeo in a production of Romeo and Juliet. In 2003, he was cast in Jake Heggie's opera Dead Man Walking at the Michigan Opera Theater. At the age of 16, Jonathan came to New York City and attended the summer acting workshop at The Lee Strasberg Theater Institute.

Upon graduation from high school in 2005, he returned to New York to become the youngest member of The Actors Center's summer intensive, followed by their nine-month conservatory program, where he studied with teachers from Juilliard, Yale, NYU and the Royal Shakespeare Company: Scott Freeman, Charles Tuthill, Lisa Benavides-Nelson, Rob Clare (RSC), Orlando Pabotoy (Clown), Jane Nichols (Clown), Per Brah (Mask), Felix Ivanov (Movement), and Grace Zandarski (Voice). He would later be invited to join The Actors Center's resident company of professional actors where he participated in scene study with Ron Van Lieu.

Jonathan auditioned in 2005 for a role in the off-Broadway musical production of Spring Awakening at the Atlantic Theater Company. Jonathan was cast in the role of Hänschen Rilow, the choir boy who seduces his fellow male classmate, for which he has received rave reviews, being cited by some as a scene-stealer. He continued with Spring Awakening as it moved to Broadway and went on to win eight Tony awards. Wright's final performance was on April 20, 2008.

In October 2007, Wright was cast as Lethario in his first feature film, Nick and Norah's Infinite Playlist, which was released on October 3, 2008. His character (also referred to as "Beefy Guy") is the boyfriend of Dev (Rafi Gavron), the lead singer for The Jerk Offs. In May 2008, Wright was cast as Trent Preston in Youth in Revolt alongside Michael Cera, his Infinite Playlist castmate. Youth in Revolt received wide theatrical release on January 8, 2010.

In 2015, Wright was cast in Center Theatre Group's production of Martin Sherman's Bent, directed by Moises Kaufman in Los Angeles.

In 2022, he took part in the HBO documentary film Spring Awakening: Those You've Known, which saw the 15 year reunion of the original cast of the musical.

Wright is also known as Jonny Wright, Jonny B. Wright and Jonny B.
