= James Anderson (lawyer) =

Scottish antiquary and historian (1662–1728)

James Anderson (5 August 1662 – 3 April 1728), Scottish antiquary and historian, was born in Edinburgh. His father was Patrick Anderson of Walston, a church minister, who was for some time imprisoned on the Bass Rock on the Firth of Forth in Haddingtonshire.

== Education and career ==
He was educated for the law, and became a writer to the signet (Scottish solicitor or attorney) in 1691. His profession gave him the opportunity of gratifying his taste for the study of ancient documents; and just before the Act of Union 1707 the Parliament of Scotland commissioned him to prepare for publication what remained of the public records of the Kingdom of Scotland, and in their last session voted a sum of £1940 pound Scots to defray his expenses.

At this work he laboured for several years; but it was not completed at his death in 1728. The book was published posthumously in 1739, edited by Thomas Ruddiman, under the title Selectus Diplomatum et Numismatum Scotiae Thesaurus. Ruddiman also produced a translation into Scots. The preparation of this great national work was expensive; and soon after his death, the numerous plates, engraved by John Sturt, were sold for £530. These plates are now lost, and the book has become exceedingly scarce.

Anderson was appointed in 1715 Postmaster General for Scotland, as some compensation for his labours; but in the political struggles of 1717 he was deprived of this office, and never again obtained any reward for his services.

Anderson had a significant personal library which included a substantial collection of works by English historians.

== Advocacy of Scottish independence ==
He published, during the controversy about whether Scotland was bound by the Act of Settlement 1701 or not, An Historical Essay showing that the Crown and Kingdom of Scotland is Imperial and Independent (Edinburgh, 1705), and later Collections relating to the History of Mary Queen of Scotland (in 4 vols, Edin., 1727–1728), both of which were later used extensively by his great-nephew, the historian William Robertson.

== See also ==
- Janet Anderson (milliner)
