= Iain Anderson =

Iain Anderson may refer to:

- Iain Anderson (cricketer) (born 1960), former English cricketer
- Iain Anderson (footballer) (born 1977), former professional footballer
- Iain Anderson (businessman) (born 1931), Scottish cricketer and automotive industry executive
- Iain Anderson, chair of the board of trustees of the UK charity Stonewall

== See also ==
- Ian Anderson (disambiguation)
