= Winston Churchill High School (Livonia, Michigan) =

High School in Livonia, Michigan

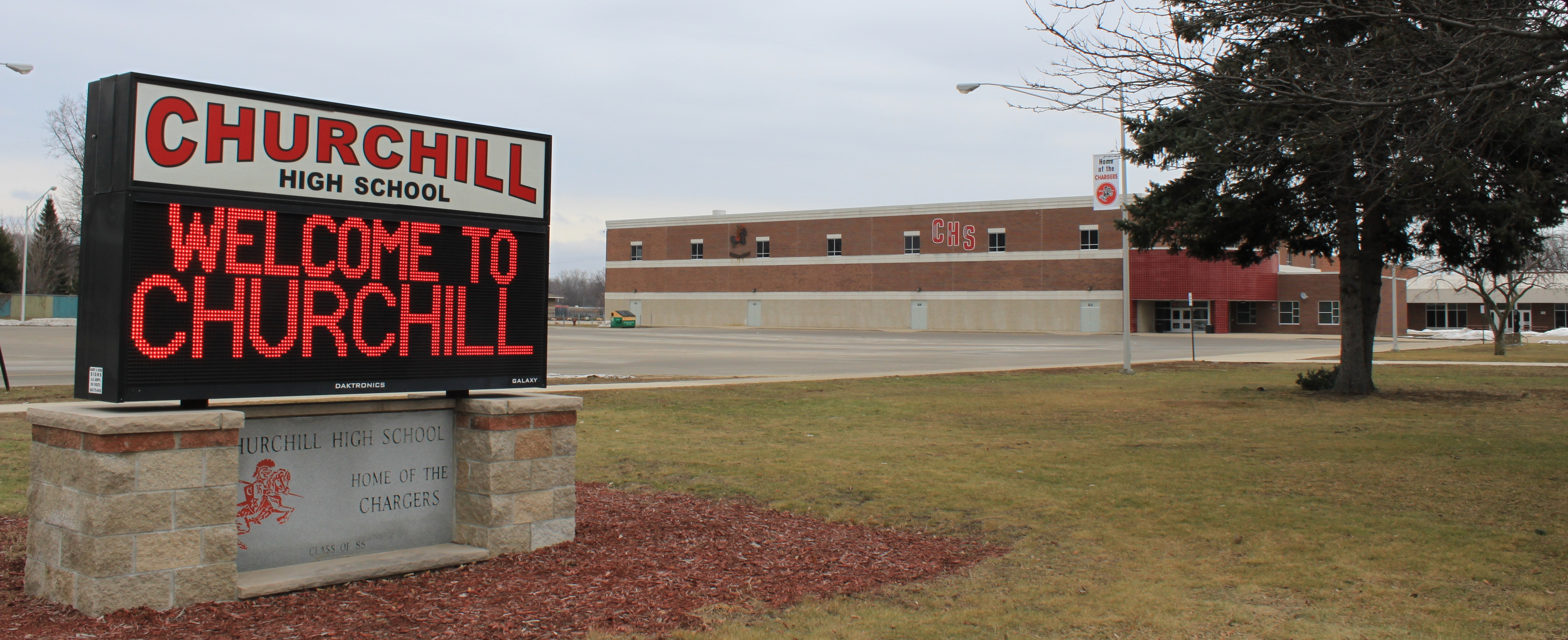

Location
- 8900 Newburgh Road; Livonia, Michigan 48150; United States; 42°21′19″N 83°24′31″W

Information
- Type: Public school
- Established: 1968
- School district: Livonia Public Schools
- Principal: Kristen Quesada
- Teaching staff: 66.00 (FTE)
- Grades: 9–12
- Enrollment: 1,247 (2023-2024)
- Student to teacher ratio: 18.89
- Colors: Black and Red
- Athletics conference: Western-Six Conference (1970-1982) Western Lakes Activities Association (1982-2008) Kensington Lakes Activities Association (2008- )
- Mascot: Sir Winston
- Team name: Chargers
- Rival: Franklin High School
- Newspaper: Charger Herald
- Yearbook: Historian
- Accreditation: North Central Association
- Website: churchill.livoniapublicschools.org

Student assessments
- 2021–22 school year Change vs. prior year

M-STEP 11th grade proficiency rates (Science / Social Studies)
- Advanced %: 23.5 / 20.5
- Proficient %: 21.6 / 33.9
- PR. Proficient %: 14.1 / 37.0
- Not Proficient %: 40.8 / 8.7

Average test scores
- SAT Total: 1037.6 (▼ −33.7)

Churchill High School, named after Winston Churchill, is one of the four main public high schools (and the most recently built) in the city of Livonia, Michigan, a western suburb of Detroit. The school was created in 1968 as an add-on to the other high schools in Livonia in response to the population boom that the city saw at the time. The first school year (1968–69), a sophomore class attended classes at nearby Franklin High School. Beginning in the 1969–70 school year, classes were then held in the new building with a junior and sophomore class. The first graduating class graduated in June 1971. The school is home to the MSC (Math, Science, and Computers) program as well as the Creative and Performing Arts program (CAPA). It also has a wide variety of athletics. The Girls' Cross-Country team finished second in the state of Michigan in 2006, and the Girls' Varsity Volleyball team won the 2007 state championship. The Livonia Career Technical Center is across the street, providing all Livonia Public School students the opportunity to engage in many hands-on activities.

== Math, Science, and Computer program ==
The Livonia Public School District provides magnet programs for the academically talented student, in grade 9 through grade 12. The magnet programs offer students the opportunity to experience learning with others of a similar intellect. Teachers and support staff are trained to take care of those under high stress, or developmental issues.

Teachers in the magnet programs at each level meet as a team on a regularly scheduled basis to integrate curricular content. Child study meetings dealing with social/emotional needs are conducted regularly in the programs.

The magnet programs include programming at the elementary level, 1–6, ACAT; middle school level, 7–8, MACAT; the high school level, 9–12 in the Math, Science and Computer Program (MSC) which is housed at Churchill High School.

The Math/Science/Computer Program, MSC, located at Churchill High School, is a four-year program that begins with a thirty-student ninth grade class. Admissions are based on previous standardized testing and a special test usually administered in a student's second year of junior high school, during the month of December. A number of students who are not initially accepted into the program (known as "alternates") may participate in a limited number of MSC classes, or may be allowed full entry if students drop out of the program at the end of a school year.

The curriculum is specifically designed for students who have an intense interest in math and science. The accelerated courses are taught at a faster pace and in greater depth. The Advance Placement, AP, Program gives students the opportunity to pursue college-level studies and receive advance placement and/or credit upon entering college. Many of the students also participate in Churchill High School's Accelerated Language Arts Program.

== Notable alumni ==
- Charlie LeDuff, journalist and winner of Pulitzer Prize
- Zach Gowen, former WWE and TNA Wrestling star
- Judy Greer, actress and former member of CAPA
- Ryan Kesler, former professional hockey player of the Anaheim Ducks and Olympic silver medalist on Team USA
- Jonathan B. Wright, actor and former member of CAPA, starred in the original Broadway production of Spring Awakening.
- Derek Grant, former drummer for Alkaline Trio and The Suicide Machines among other notable bands
- Chris Conner, professional hockey player
- Shawn Tinnes, Folk musician known by her stage name Sista Otis
- Torey Krug, professional hockey player for the St. Louis Blues
- Adam Bedell, member of the MLS Columbus Crew
