= Livonia Public Schools =

School district in Michigan

Address
- 15125 Farmington Road Livonia, Wayne, Michigan, 48154; United States

District information
- Grades: PreK-12
- Superintendent: Andrea Oquist
- Schools: 26
- Budget: US$301,267,000 (2022-23 expenditures)
- NCES District ID: 2621840

Students and staff
- Students: 13,076 (2024-2025)
- Teachers: 838.93 FTE (2024-25)
- Staff: 1,655.2 on FTE basis (2024-2025)
- Student–teacher ratio: 15.59 (2024-2025)

Other information
- Website: www.livoniapublicschools.org

Livonia Public Schools (LPS) is a public school district in the Metro Detroit area, serving most of the city of Livonia and the northernmost portions of Westland.

== History ==
Seven small school districts consolidated in 1944 to form Livonia Public Schools district. Bentley High School was the district's first high school. Designed by architect Eberle M. Smith, it opened in November 1947, followed by Franklin, Stevenson, and Churchill High Schools in the 1960s. Bentley High School closed in spring 1985 and was demolished in 1999.

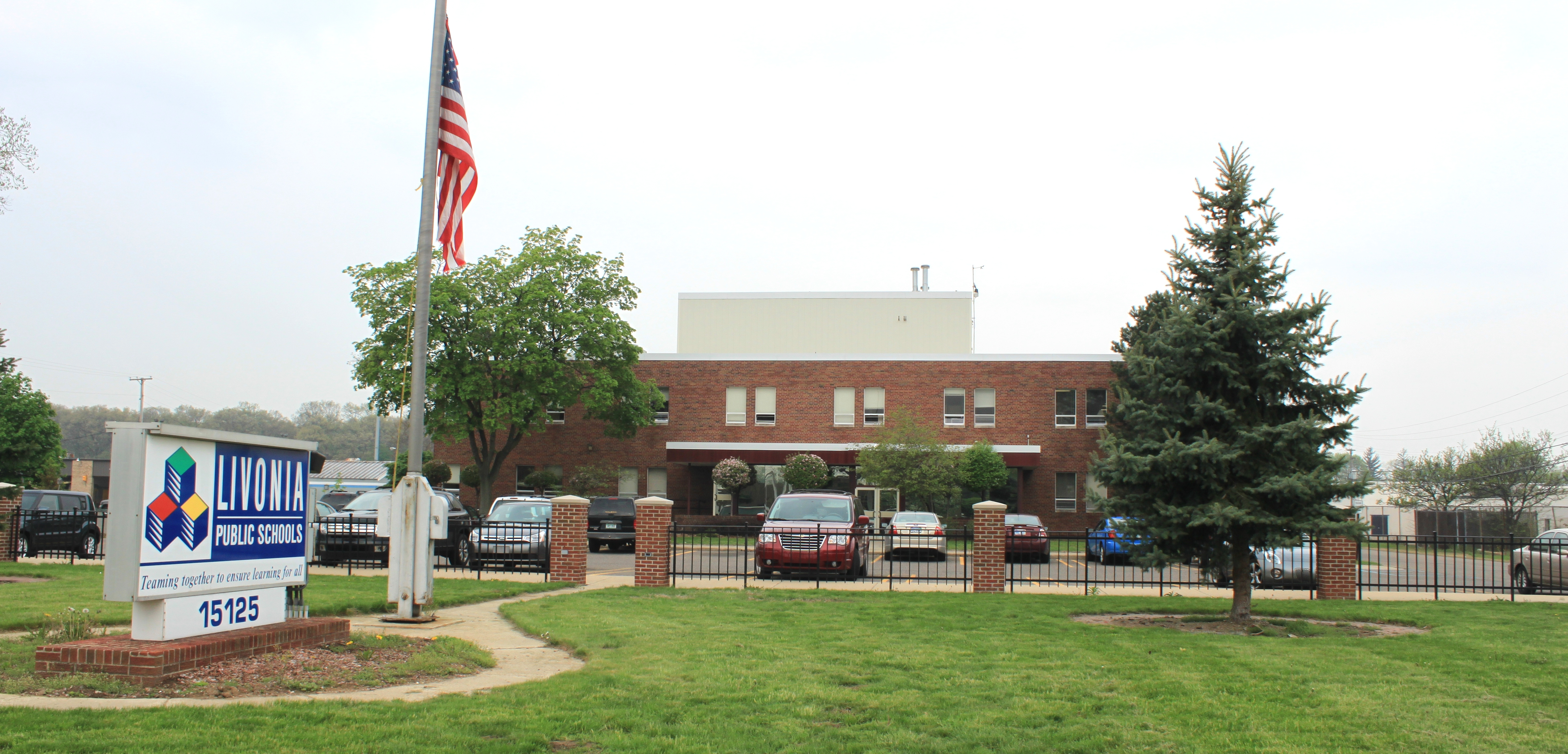
Livonia Public Schools Administration Building

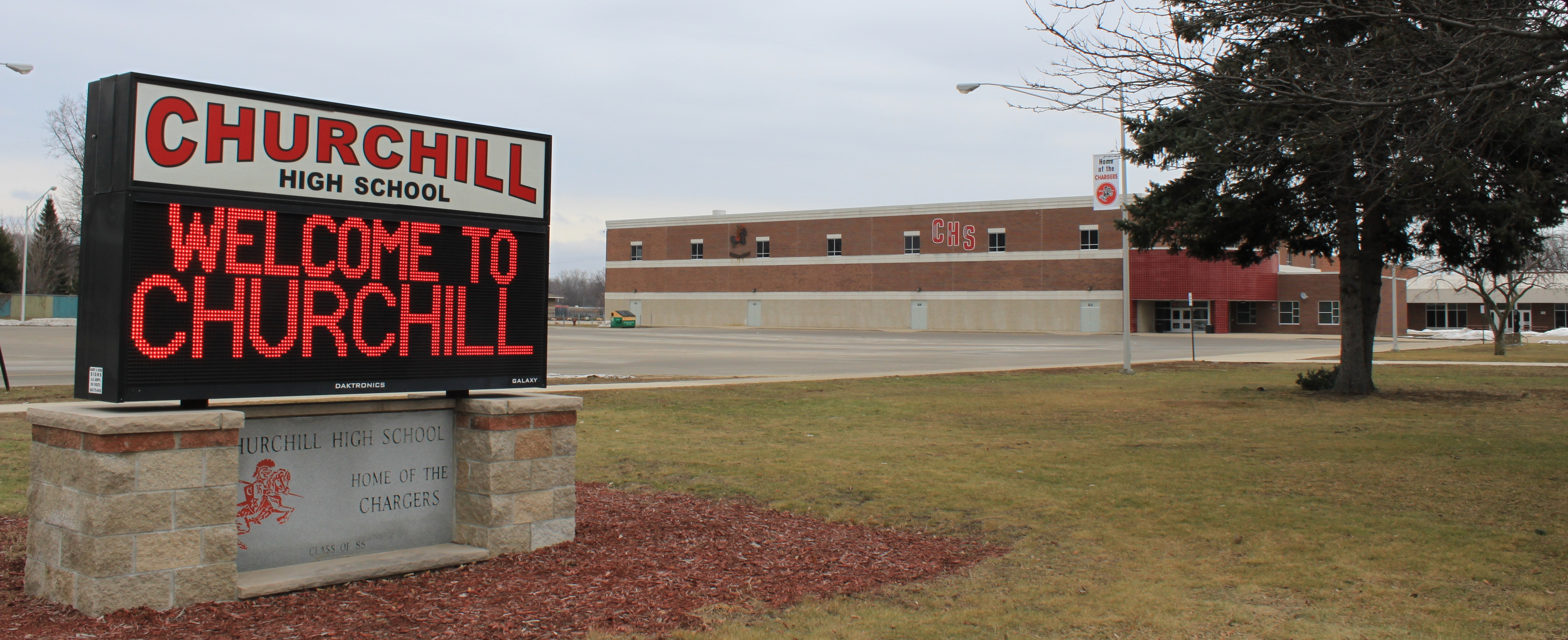
Winston Churchill High School

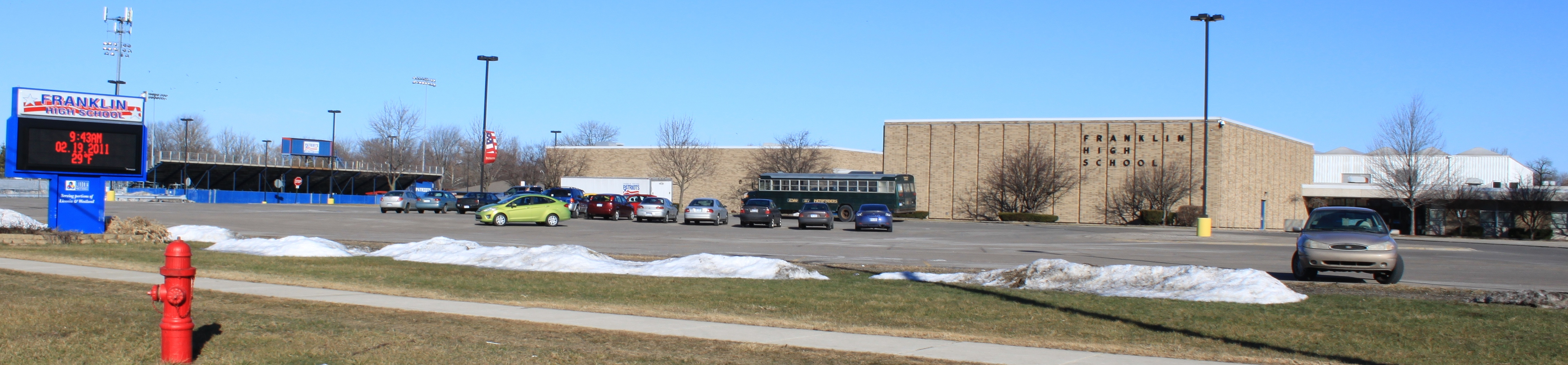
Franklin High School

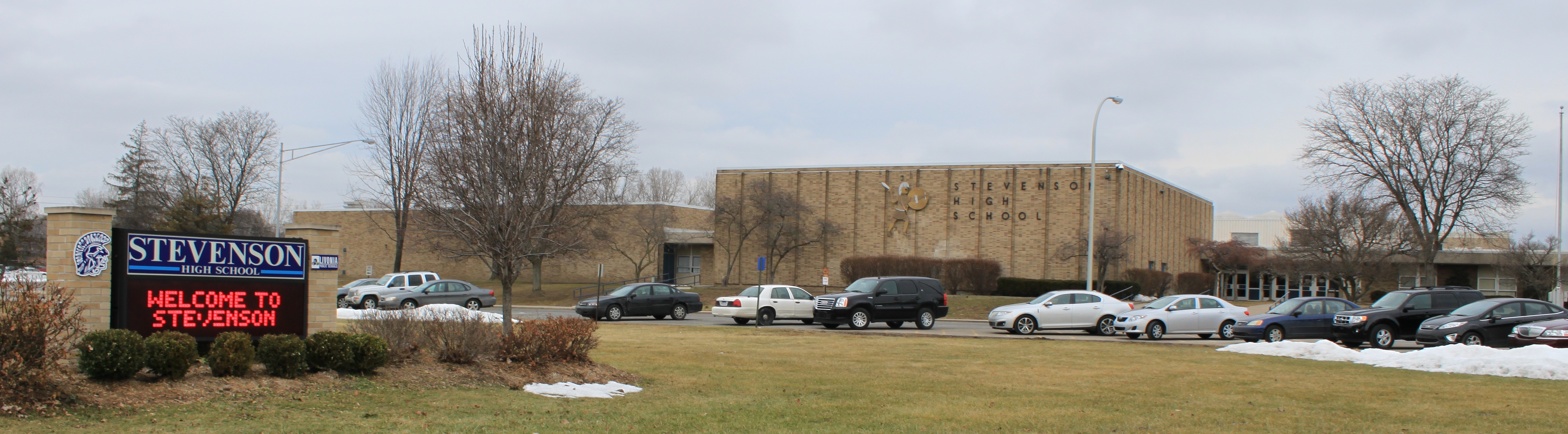
Adlai E. Stevenson High School

== Schools ==
Schools on Livonia Public Schools district
School	Address	Notes
Elementary Schools (Grades K-4)
Buchanan Elementary School	16400 Hubbard Rd., Livonia	
Cleveland Elementary School	28030 Cathedral, Livonia	
Coolidge Elementary School	30500 Curtis, Livonia	
Grant Elementary School	9300 Hubbard, Livonia	
Hayes Elementary School	30600 Louise, Westland	
Hoover Elementary School	15900 Levan, Livonia	
Kennedy Elementary School	14201 Hubbard, Livonia	
Randolph Elementary School	14470 Norman, Livonia	
Roosevelt Elementary School	30200 Lyndon, Livonia	
Rosedale Elementary School	36651 Ann Arbor Trail, Livonia	
Upper Elementary Schools (Grades 5-6)
Cooper Upper Elementary School	28550 Ann Arbor Trail, Westland	
Johnson Upper Elementary School	8400 N. Hix Rd., Westland	
Riley Upper Elementary School	15555 Henry Ruff, Livonia	
Middle Schools (Grades 7-8)
Emerson Middle School	29100 W Chicago, Livonia	Named after Ralph Waldo Emerson.
Frost Middle School	14041 Stark Rd., Livonia	Named after Robert Frost.
Holmes Middle School	16200 Newburgh Rd., Livonia	Named after Oliver Wendell Holmes Sr.
High Schools
Benjamin Franklin High School	31000 Joy Rd., Livonia	Opened in fall 1962.
Adlai E. Stevenson High School	33500 W. Six Mile Rd., Livonia	Opened in 1965. Named after Adlai Stevenson II.
Winston Churchill High School	8900 Newburgh Rd., Livonia	Opened in 1969. Named after Winston Churchill.
Other Schools
Livonia Early Childhood Center	18000 Newburgh Rd., Livonia	Opened fall 2024
Livonia Career Technical Center	8985 Newburgh Rd., Livonia	Opened in 1969
Niji-Iro Elementary School	36611 Curtis Rd., Livonia	Japanese language/English immersion school, focuses on study of the Japanese language.
Webster Elementary School	32401 Pembroke, Livonia	K-6 School
