= Harper Woods School District =

School district in Michigan, USA

Address
- 19851 Anita Street Harper Woods, Wayne, Michigan, 48838; United States

District information
- Grades: Pre-Kindergarten-12
- Superintendent: Steven McGhee
- Schools: 7
- Budget: $43,487,000 2022-2023 expenditures
- NCES District ID: 2617760

Students and staff
- Students: 3,041 (2024-2025)
- Teachers: 97.1 (on an FTE basis) (2024-2025)
- Staff: 271.95 FTE (2024-2025)
- Student–teacher ratio: 31.32 (2024-2025)

Other information
- Website: www.hwschools.org

Harper Woods School District is a public school district in Metro Detroit. It serves part of Harper Woods, Michigan.

== History ==
In 2003 the district twice attempted to pass a $42 million bond that called for replacing all three school buildings. Both attempts failed, with the first failing by 25 votes and the second failing by 700 votes. If either attempted passed, each Harper Woods School District taxpayer would have had to pay an extra amount over $260 per year for 30 years. Daniel Danosky, the superintendent, said that if the district decided to renovate, the cost would be about $32 million. He argued that it would make more sense to instead build new and pay $42 million.

As of March 2004, of the 3,600 households within the school district, less than 25% had school-aged children. Not all of them were enrolled in the public school system. As a result, the residents of the Harper Woods School District had a reluctance to pass school bonds.

In September 2004, a $34,450,000 ($58 million in 2025 dollars) bond issue passed to build a new high school on the site of the former high school. The designer of the new building was Wold Architects and Engineers.

In 2013 board members considered the possibility of a school uniform policy. As of 2016 all schools now have uniform policies.

The National Clearinghouse for Educational Statistics includes Harper Woods Virtual Academy, an online school headquartered at 19872 Kelly Road in Harper Woods, in the school district's enrollment total. The district does not include the school on its website. As of the 2023-2024 school year, the online school enrolled 746 students in kindergarten through twelfth grade.

== Schools ==
Schools in Harper Woods School District
School	Address	Notes
Beacon Elementary	19475 Beaconsfield, Harper Woods	Grades PreK-2
Tyrone Elementary	19525 Tyrone, Harper Woods	Grades 3-5
Harper Woods Middle School	19800 Anita, Harper Woods	Grades 6-8. Also known as Triumph Middle School.
Harper Woods High School	20225 Beaconsfield, Harper Woods	Grades 9-12
Harper Woods Virtual Academy	19872 Kelly Rd., Harper Woods	
College & Career Institute	20570 Kelly Rd., Harper Woods	
