= Jan Andersson (footballer, born 1965) =

Swedish footballer (born 1965)

Personal information
- Full name: Jan Edgar Andersson
- Date of birth: 7 May 1965 (age 61)
- Place of birth: Västeras, Sweden
- Height: 1.80 m (5 ft 11 in)
- Position: Defender

Senior career*
Years	Team	Apps	(Gls)
–1988	IFK Västerås		
1989–1992	Djurgården		
1993–1994	AIK		
- * Club domestic league appearances and goals

Jan Edgar Andersson (born 7 May 1965) is a Swedish former footballer who played as a defender. He made 38 Allsvenskan appearances for Djurgården and scored 4 goals.
