= Janet M. Anderson =

American illustrator

Janet Anderson
- Born: 1949; Royal Oak, Michigan
- Died: 1996 (aged 46-47)
- Known for: Commercial Art

Janet Anderson (1949–1996) was a successful Detroit commercial artist.

== Biography ==
Born in Royal Oak, Michigan and raised in nearby St. Clair Shores, Anderson honed her artistic talents by studying drawing, illustration, and printmaking at the Cranbrook Academy of Art, University of Michigan, Center for Creative Studies in Detroit, and Pratt Institute, Brooklyn. Though Anderson would cycle between Detroit and New York City during the mid-1970s and early 1980s, Detroit was her true artistic home. Residing in the western suburb of Livonia for much of her adult life, Anderson gained renown for the clarity and animation of her ink drawings, watercolors, murals, and prints. Anderson's commercial work features depictions of famous Detroit landmarks and life along the Detroit River and Lake St. Clair. (Her grandfather was a captain of the SS Ste. Clair).

Anderson displayed her work at Detroit institutions such as the Art Institute of Detroit, the Fisher Building, Detroit Historical Museum, Detroit Bicentennial Gallery, Renaissance Center, and Cobo Hall. Her work is perhaps known for forming an integral part of the Detroit Historical Society's "Documenting Detroit" and for copyrighted depictions of such landmarks as Greektown. She received commissions from a wide range of business, publications, advertising campaigns, and individuals, having her work shown to visiting celebrities and dignitaries such as Hello Dolly! star Carol Channing and U.S. President Gerald Ford. She illustrated such books as The Windows of Old Mariners Church.

Meanwhile, Anderson also created oil canvases & watercolors of her own, playing with sweeps of color and shape in abstracts and wild textures in street scenes and surreal portraits.

Anderson succumbed to breast cancer in 1996. Her last inks hauntingly depict excruciating cycles of diagnosis, chemotherapy, remission, and metastasis.
