= Janet Anderson (milliner) =

Scottish milliner

- Born: 1697; Edinburgh, Scotland
- Died: 3 March 1761 (aged 63–64)
- Occupation: Milliner

Janet Anderson (1697 – 3 March 1761) was a Scottish milliner and maker of grave-clothes in Edinburgh. born to Jean Ellis and James Anderson.

In 1710 the painter and copyist John Alexander wrote to her father, asking him to help a Mrs Kath Shippard or Shepherd, who planned to be a milliner. She was a niece of John Campbell, a Scottish goldsmith based in London, and lived at the top flat in Gray's Close in Edinburgh.

Janet Anderson joined the Merchant Company of Edinburgh in 1718, buying and selling goods in London and at fairs. She continued her work throughout the 1740s and 1750s as shown from her bills and family papers. She made grave-clothes for notable figures such as Sir John Clerk.
