= Franklin High School (Livonia, Michigan) =

Public high school in Livonia, Michigan

Benjamin Franklin High School

Location
- 31000 Joy Road; Livonia, Michigan 48150; 42.356°N 83.345°W

Information
- Type: Public school
- Motto: Home of the Patriots
- Established: 1961
- School district: Livonia Public Schools
- Principal: Andrew Pesci
- Teaching staff: 65.20 (FTE)
- Grades: 9–12
- Enrollment: 1,306 (2023–2024)
- Student to teacher ratio: 20.03
- Colors: Midnight blue and red
- Athletics conference: Northwest-Suburban Conference (1963-1985); Western Lakes Activities Association (1985-2008); Kensington Lakes Activities Association (2008- )
- Mascot: Patriot
- Team name: Patriots
- Rival: Churchill High School
- Newspaper: The Packet
- Yearbook: Almanack
- Accreditation: North Central Association
- Website: FHS

Student assessments
- 2021–22 school year Change vs. prior year

M-STEP 11th grade proficiency rates (Science / Social Studies)
- Advanced %: 11.1 / 10.4
- Proficient %: 23.2 / 22.2
- PR. Proficient %: 15.5 / 45.5
- Not Proficient %: 50.2 / 21.9

Average test scores
- SAT Total: 964.0 (▼ −22)

Benjamin Franklin High School, also referred to as Franklin High School, Livonia Franklin and FHS, is a public high school located in Livonia, Michigan, a suburb west of Detroit.

== History ==
Established in September 1961, a sophomore class attended classes at nearby Bentley High School during the 1961–62 school year. Classes were then taught at FHS when that building opened in September 1962. The school celebrated its first graduating class in June 1964. During the 1968–69 school year, a sophomore class from Churchill High School attended classes at Franklin High School as construction commenced on that school building. A freshman class was added to Franklin High School for the 1979-80 school year, the first ninth-grade class since the school opened.

== International Baccalaureate Program ==
Franklin High School is the first public school in Wayne County to offer the IB Diploma program. Faculty members have been trained in the areas of Administration, Coordination, Visual Arts, History of the Americas, Spanish, Biology, Chemistry, Mathematics, English and Theory of Knowledge. At the training sessions, teachers spend 3–5 days learning about international perspectives regarding pedagogy, curricular requirements, and standards of assessment.

== Livonia Career Technical Center ==
The Livonia Public School system offers classes at the Livonia Career Technical Center. The Career Center hosts state approved career technical programs to students of Churchill, Franklin, and Stevenson High Schools.

== Athletics ==
=== State championships ===
- Football: 1975
- Girls Softball: 1986
- Girls Pompon: 2022
- Boys Varsity Bowling: 2022
- Boys Wrestling: 2024

== Notable alumni ==
- Bernie Carbo: MLB OF/DH (Cincinnati Reds, St. Louis Cardinals, Boston Red Sox, Milwaukee Brewers, Cleveland Indians, Pittsburgh Pirates (Class of 1965)
- Charlie Collins, Republican member of the Arkansas House of Representatives since 2010. (Class of 1981)
- Art Regner: Detroit sports radio personality, WDFN, WXYT, Fox Sports Detroit (Class of 1975)
- Amy Roloff: Mother of family featured in Little People, Big World (Class of 1980)
- Mike Donnelly: NHL (New York Rangers, Buffalo Sabres, Los Angeles Kings, Dallas Stars, New York Islanders) (Class of 1981)
- Mike Modano: NHL: (Minnesota North Stars, Dallas Stars, Detroit Red Wings) (Class of 1988)
- Paul Terek: USA: (US Olympic Team, Athens Olympics 2004), American Ninja Warrior (Class of 1997)
- Israel Woolfork: NFL: (Arizona Cardinals) Quarterbacks Coach (Class of 2008)
- Dylan Wegela: Democratic Member of the Michigan House of Representatives since 2023. (Class of 2011)
