= Livonia, Michigan =

- City
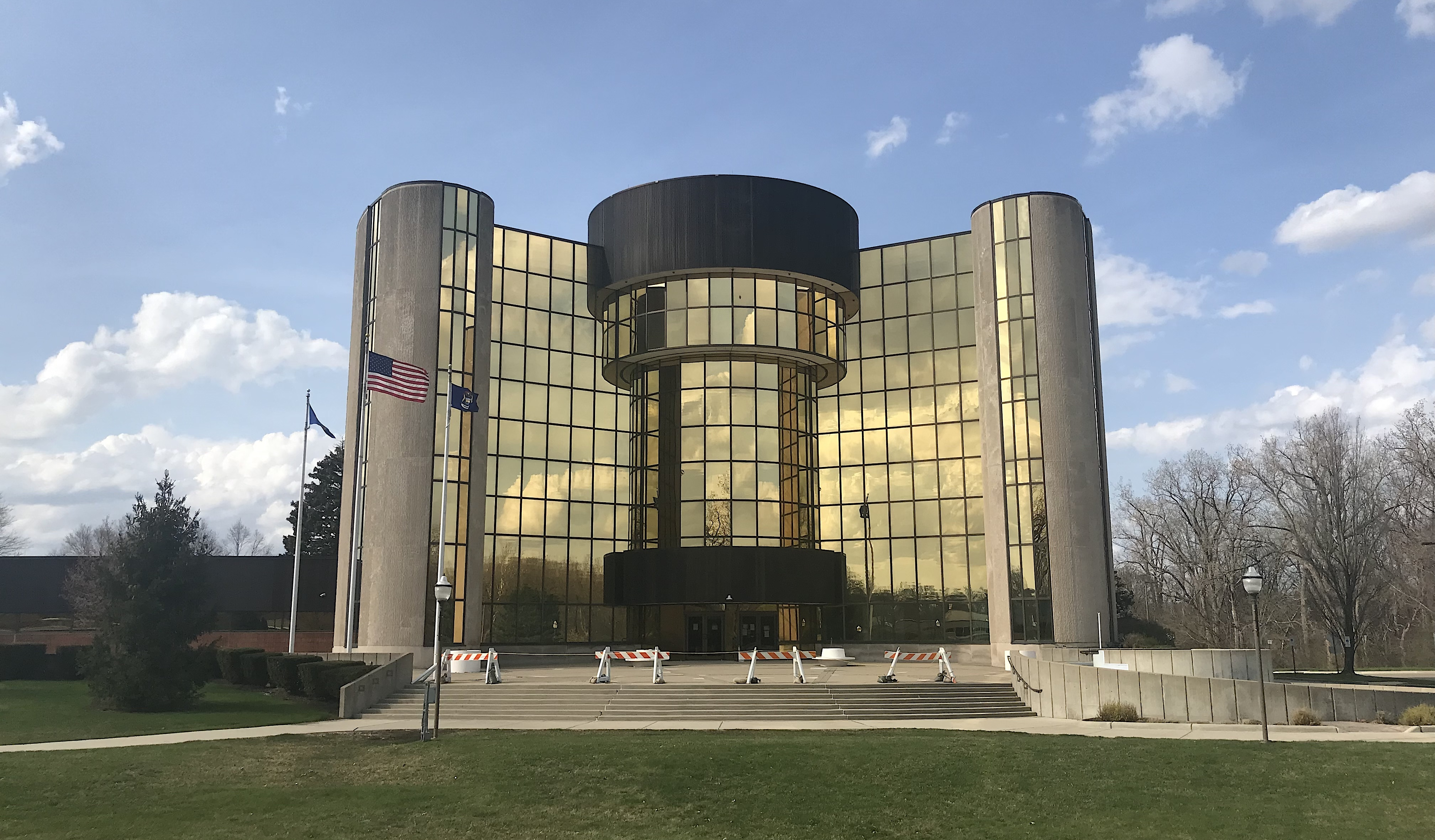
- Livonia City Hall

- Logo
- Motto: "Come home to Livonia!"
- Interactive map of Livonia, Michigan
- Location within Michigan Location within the United States
- Coordinates: 42°23′50″N 83°22′25″W
- Country: United States
- State: Michigan
- County: Wayne
- Organized: 1835 (Livonia Township)
- Incorporated: 1950

Government
  - Type: Mayor–council
  - Mayor: Maureen Miller Brosnan
  - Clerk: Lori Miller

Area
  - City: 35.85 sq mi (92.86 km^{2})
  - Land: 35.70 sq mi (92.45 km^{2})
  - Water: 0.16 sq mi (0.41 km^{2})
- Elevation: 676 ft (206 m)

Population (2020)
  - City: 95,535
  - Density: 2,676.4/sq mi (1,033.38/km^{2})
  - Metro: 4,285,832 (Metro Detroit)
- Time zone: UTC−5 (EST)
  - Summer (DST): UTC−4 (EDT)
- Zip code(s): 48150–48154
- Area codes: 248 and 734
- FIPS code: 26-49000
- GNIS feature ID: 0630841
- Website: livonia.gov

Livonia (/ləˈvoʊnjə/ lə-VOHN-yə) is a city in Wayne County in the U.S. state of Michigan. A western suburb of Detroit, Livonia is located roughly 20 miles (32.2 km) northwest of downtown Detroit. As of the 2020 census, the city had a population of 95,535. Originally organized as Livonia Township in 1835, it was incorporated as a city in 1950.

== History ==
After most members of the indigenous tribes were pushed out of the area, ethnic European-American pioneers from New England and New York settled here. The borders of Livonia Township were defined by the Legislature of the Territory of Michigan on March 17, 1835.

The settlers named the community "Livonia", after Livonia, New York, a town in the western part of the state, from where many had migrated.

Livonia Township was split off from Nankin Township, in which a Livonia post office had been established in June 1834. During the days of the township, a number of small communities developed. One of these was Elmwood, initially known as McKinley's Station. It was a stop on the Detroit, Lansing and Northern Railroad. It had a separate post office from 1858 until 1906. Another post office in the township was Giltedge, which operated from 1899 until 1902.

Livonia was incorporated as a city on May 23, 1950, by vote of the citizens of the township. An incentive was that this status would allow the residents to gain tax revenues from the Detroit Race Course (DRC). From 1985, it ran only flat racing for Thoroughbreds, and the track closed in 1998, when the large property was sold for redevelopment. The last race tracks operating in the state were Hazel Park Raceway, which closed in 2018, and Northville Downs, which closed in 2024.

Among the immigrants attracted to Detroit for its industrial jobs in the 20th century have been Palestinian and Lebanese Christians, as well as Muslims. By 1985, Palestinian Christians had settled in Livonia, as well as the western suburbs of Farmington and Westland. As of 2005, there were a number of Christian Palestinian Americans who had immigrated from Ramallah. They have developed and operated several small- and medium-sized businesses.

Six U.S. presidents have visited Livonia: Richard Nixon, Gerald Ford, Ronald Reagan, George H. W. Bush, Bill Clinton and George W. Bush.

== Geography ==
According to the United States Census Bureau, the city has a total area of 35.86 square miles (92.88 km^{2}), of which 35.70 square miles (92.46 km^{2}) is land and 0.16 square miles (0.41 km^{2}) is water.

The city has many creeks and rivers, but most notably majority portions of both Newburgh and Nankin Lake in the south and south-west. The two lakes are connected by both a river and Edward N. Hines Drive, known simply as Hines Drive by locals.

== Demographics ==
Historical population
Census	Pop.	Note	%±
1900	1,460		—
1910	1,365		−6.5%
1920	1,608		17.8%
1930	3,192		98.5%
1940	8,728		173.4%
1950	17,634		102.0%
1960	66,702		278.3%
1970	110,109		65.1%
1980	104,814		−4.8%
1990	100,850		−3.8%
2000	100,545		−0.3%
2010	96,942		−3.6%
2020	95,535		−1.5%
2023 (est.)	92,185		−3.5%
U.S. Decennial Census; 2018 Estimate

=== Racial and ethnic composition ===
Livonia, Michigan – Racial and ethnic composition Note: the US Census treats Hispanic/Latino as an ethnic category. This table excludes Latinos from the racial categories and assigns them to a separate category. Hispanics/Latinos may be of any race.
Race / Ethnicity (NH = Non-Hispanic)	Pop 2000	Pop 2010	Pop 2020	% 2000	% 2010	% 2020
White alone (NH)	94,651	87,332	80,242	94.14%	90.09%	83.99%
Black or African American alone (NH)	945	3,264	4,488	0.94%	3.37%	4.70%
Native American or Alaska Native alone (NH)	207	204	189	0.21%	0.21%	0.20%
Asian alone (NH)	1,944	2,441	3,011	1.93%	2.52%	3.15%
Native Hawaiian or Pacific Islander alone (NH)	13	11	9	0.01%	0.01%	0.01%
Other race alone (NH)	72	86	322	0.07%	0.09%	0.34%
Mixed race or Multiracial (NH)	982	1,205	3,791	0.98%	1.24%	3.97%
Hispanic or Latino (any race)	1,731	2,399	3,483	1.72%	2.47%	3.65%
Total	100,545	96,942	95,535	100.00%	100.00%	100.00%

=== 2020 census ===
As of the 2020 census, Livonia had a population of 95,535. The median age was 45.6 years. 17.9% of residents were under the age of 18 and 21.5% of residents were 65 years of age or older. For every 100 females there were 96.5 males, and for every 100 females age 18 and over there were 94.5 males age 18 and over.

100.0% of residents lived in urban areas, while 0.0% lived in rural areas.

There were 39,282 households in Livonia, of which 24.8% had children under the age of 18 living in them. Of all households, 53.5% were married-couple households, 16.9% were households with a male householder and no spouse or partner present, and 24.5% were households with a female householder and no spouse or partner present. About 27.7% of all households were made up of individuals and 13.9% had someone living alone who was 65 years of age or older.

There were 40,380 housing units, of which 2.7% were vacant. The homeowner vacancy rate was 0.7% and the rental vacancy rate was 5.3%.

The most reported ancestries in the 2020 census were:

- German (23.5%)
- Irish (21.1%)
- English (17.3%)
- Polish (16%)
- Italian (9.2%)
- Scottish (6.2%)
- French (5.8%)
- African American (3.5%)
- Mexican (2.3%)
- Hungarian (1.9%)

=== 2010 census ===
According to a 2010 American Community Survey, the median income for a household in the city was $65,391, and the median income for a family was $77,119. Males had a median income of $62,071 versus $42,083 for females. The per capita income for the city was $29,536. About 5.4% of families and 7.8% of the population were below the poverty line, including 15.6% of those under age 18 and 3.8% of those age 65 or over.

As of the census of 2010, there were 96,942 people, 38,714 households, and 26,856 families living in the city. The population density was 2,715.5 inhabitants per square mile (1,048.5/km^{2}). There were 40,401 housing units at an average density of 1,131.7 per square mile (437.0/km^{2}). The racial makeup of the city was 92.0% White, 3.4% African American, 0.2% Native American, 2.5% Asian, 0.4% from other races, and 1.4% from two or more races. Hispanic or Latino people of any race were 2.5% of the population.

There were 38,714 households, of which 29.1% had children under the age of 18 living with them, 55.9% were married couples living together, 9.7% had a female householder with no husband present, 3.8% had a male householder with no wife present, and 30.6% were non-families. Of all households 26.7% were made up of individuals, and 13.1% had someone living alone who was 65 years of age or older. The average household size was 2.47 and the average family size was 3.01.

The median age in the city was 44.5 years. 20.8% of residents were under the age of 18; 7.6% were between the ages of 18 and 24; 22.2% were from 25 to 44; 31.5% were from 45 to 64; and 17.7% were 65 years of age or older. The gender makeup of the city was 48.3% male and 51.7% female.

=== 2000 census ===
As of the census of 2000, there were 100,545 people, 38,089 households, and 28,071 families living in the city. The population density was 2,815.0 inhabitants per square mile (1,086.9/km^{2}). There were 38,658 housing units at an average density of 1,082.3 per square mile (417.9/km^{2}). The racial makeup of the city was 95.45% White, 0.95% African American, 0.22% Native American, 1.94% Asian, 0.01% Pacific Islander, 0.32% from other races, and 1.11% from two or more races. Hispanic or Latino people of any race were 1.72% of the population. 16.3% were of Polish, 15.9% German, 11.2% Irish, 8.6% Italian and 8.5% English ancestry according to Census 2000. Livonia has a substantial Middle Eastern population, mostly Arab, and trace their ancestry to the Levant region, mainly from Syria, Jordan, Palestine, and Lebanon, and are of the Christian faith. The Arab-American community has few churches in the city, Mainly Saint Mary's Antiochian Orthodox Christian Church. The community settled in Livonia in the late 1960s and has since continued a steady growth.

There were 38,089 households, out of which 32.5% had children under the age of 18 living with them, 62.8% were married couples living together, 8.0% had a female householder with no husband present, and 26.3% were non-families. Of all households, 22.9% were made up of individuals, and 11.1% had someone living alone who was 65 years of age or older. The average household size was 2.59 and the average family size was 3.07.

In the city, the population was spread out, with 23.8% under the age of 18, 6.3% was from 18 to 24, 28.7% was from 25 to 44, 24.3% was from 45 to 64, and 16.9% was 65 years of age or older. The median age was 40 years. For every 100 females, there were 94.0 males. For every 100 females age 18 and over, there were 90.8 males.

As of 2000, Livonia was the city in the United States with over 100,000 people that had the highest percentage of non-Hispanic white people.

== Economy ==
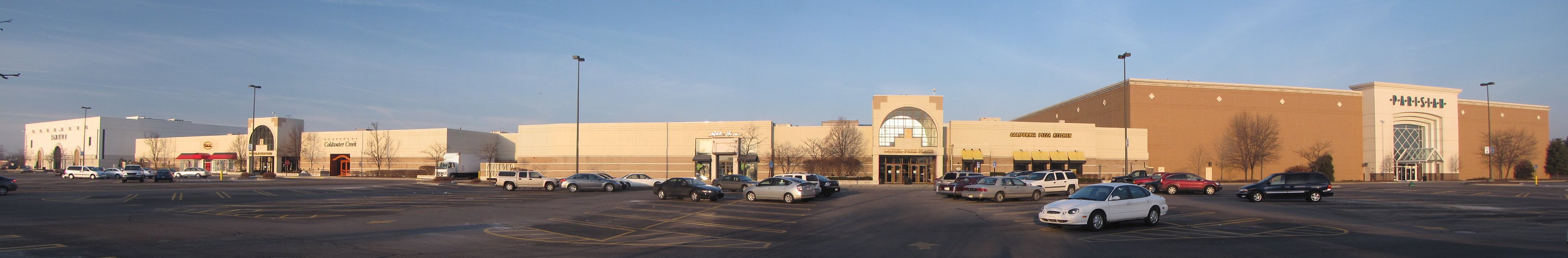
Laurel Park Place, east entrance

In addition to its schools, colleges, churches, parks, recreation center, libraries and the St. Mary Mercy Hospital, Livonia also has commercial and industrial sectors, restaurants and retail stores. Laurel Park Place, an upscale fashion mall with 74 stores, was built in 1989 at 6 Mile Road and Newburgh Road. Von Maur department store serves as the anchor.

The city previously featured two other malls which have since been dismantled. Wonderland Mall was the first, opening in 1959 and closing in 2003; it was replaced with a development called Wonderland Village, anchored by Walmart and Target. Livonia Mall was built to the north in 1964. It also closed in 2008 and was redeveloped as Livonia Marketplace, featuring a second Walmart, along with Sears and Kohl's. The Sears store closed in 2020. Other big-box stores are located near Laurel Park Place.

Livonia is home to the Livonia Hockey Association, the largest amateur hockey association in Michigan, as well as two-time state champions the Livonia Knights. The city also boasts the Livonia City Soccer Club, one of the largest soccer programs in the state, with 1,300 participants.

=== Leading employers ===
1. Ford Motor Company
2. Trinity Health
3. Livonia Public Schools
4. St. Mary Mercy Hospital
5. NYX, Inc
6. ZF Automotive
7. Schoolcraft College
8. Roush Performance
9. United Parcel Service
10. Mastronardi Produce

== Arts and culture ==
The Livonia Public Library includes the Civic Center Library, the Alfred Noble Library, the Carl Sandburg Library, and the Vest Pocket Library. The Jack E. Kirksey Livonia Community Recreation Center, named after Mayor Jack Kirksey, is located it 15100 Hubbard Livonia, MI 48154

Every year in June, Livonia hosts a celebration called the Livonia Spree to celebrate the city's anniversary. The Spree includes a fair with food, rides, live music, and has a fireworks show.

== Government ==
Livonia's mayor is Maureen Miller Brosnan. The city is located in Michigan's 12th congressional district, represented by Rashida Tlaib (Democrat). Livonia is in Michigan's 7th State Senate District, and is represented by Dayna Polehanki (Democrat).

Most of Livonia makes up Michigan's 19th State House District, which elected Laurie Pohutsky (Democrat) in 2018. A part of southeast Livonia is in the 11th district, which is represented by, Jewell Jones (Democrat).

== Education ==
=== Colleges and universities ===
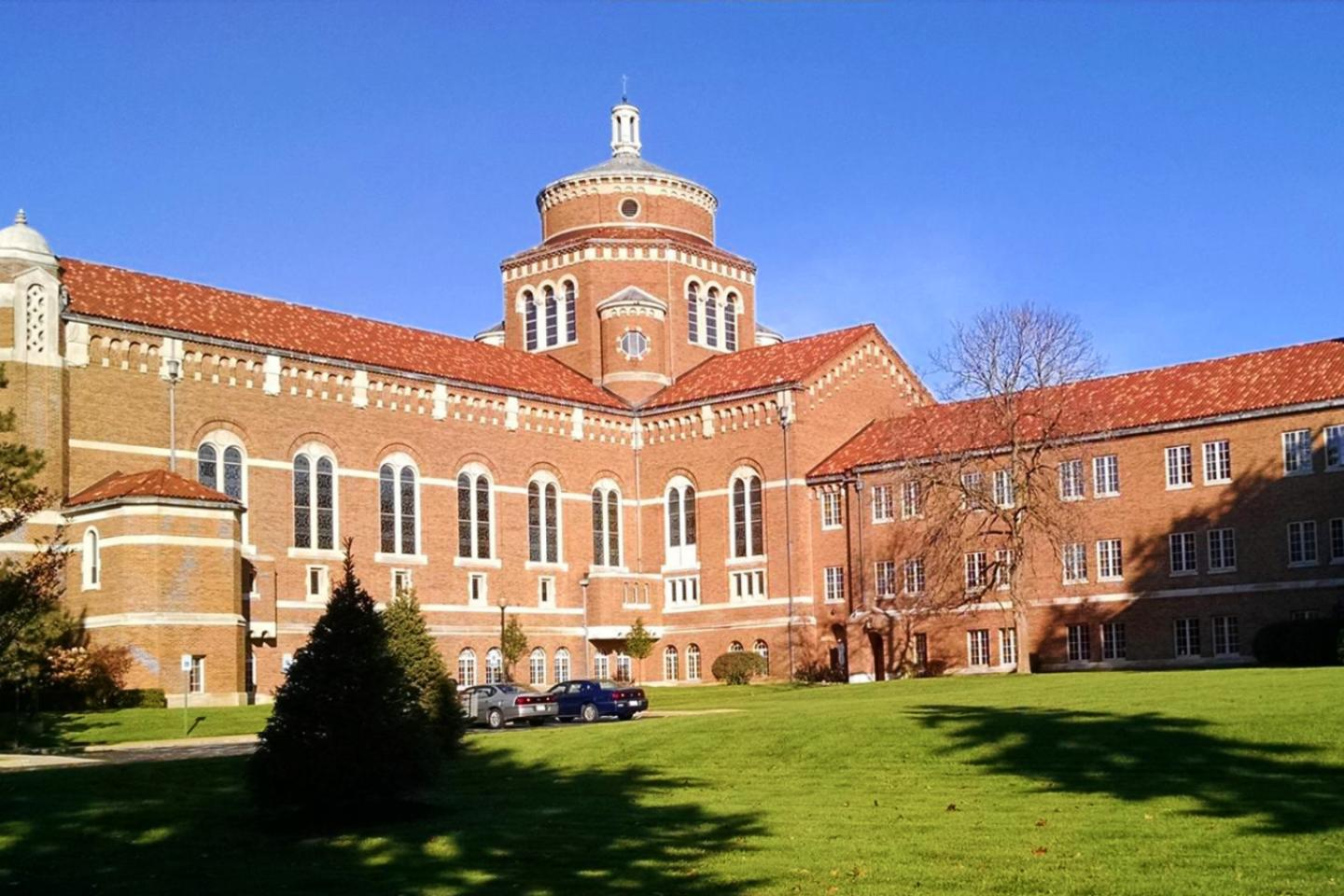
Madonna University

Various private and public colleges and universities are located in Livonia, including Madonna University, Schoolcraft College, and a small University of Phoenix campus. The most recent university to open in Livonia is a Davenport University campus, which opened in 2008, but left the city to move to Detroit in 2017.

=== Primary and secondary schools ===
==== Public schools ====
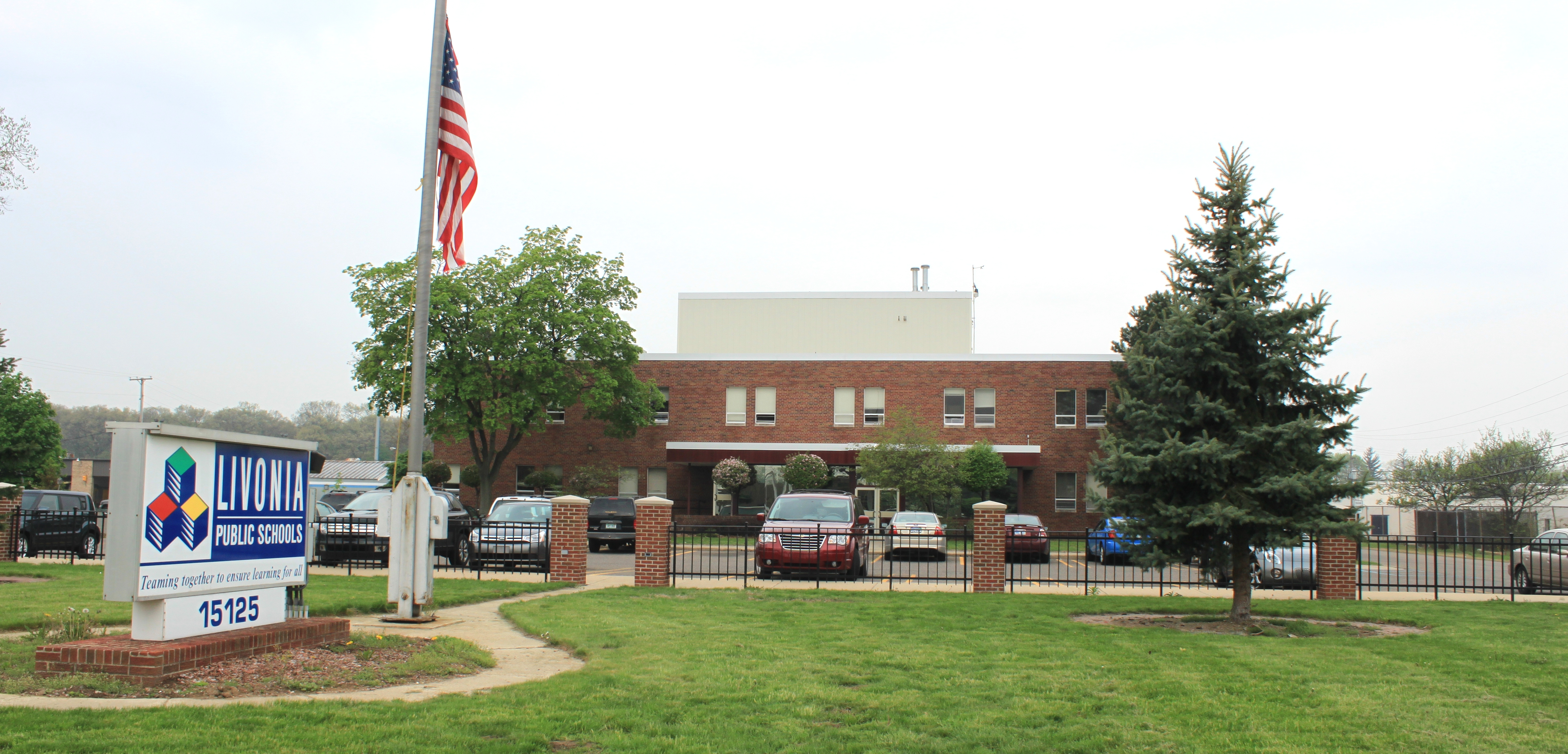
Livonia Public Schools administration

Most of Livonia is served by the Livonia Public Schools district, consisting of two early childhood centers, thirteen elementary schools, four upper elementary Schools, three middle schools and three high schools. The district also serves students in portions of Westland. A portion of northeast Livonia is served by the Clarenceville School District.

There are currently four high schools in Livonia, all of which are public: Franklin, Churchill and Stevenson high schools in the Livonia Public Schools district; and Clarenceville High School in the Clarenceville Public School District. Ladywood High School, a Catholic all-girls private school run by the Felician Sisters, closed in 2018. Bentley High School, the first high school built in the district, closed in 1985.

Each high school in the Livonia Public School District offers a different educational program. Stevenson High School is the home of the school of Global Education, an alternative education model which combines students' English and social studies classes with a focus on the student's role in the world. Churchill houses the MSC (Math/Science/Computer) and CAPA (Creative and Performing Arts) programs. Franklin currently offers an International Baccalaureate program for select students.

Frost Middle School houses the Middle School Alternative Classrooms for the Academically Talented (MACAT) program. The public K-6 Webster Elementary School is home to the Alternative Classrooms for the Academically Talented (ACAT) program, as well as many after-school programs. Webster also has classes for disabled children. In 2008, the original Webster school was burned down by an arsonist, and Webster was moved to a closed-down school, Tyler Elementary.

=== Alternative schools ===
- CAPA, a performance art program at Churchill high school
- MSC (Math, Science, Computers) a program for the academically gifted housed at Churchill High School.

=== Private schools ===
- Ladywood High School, a private, Roman Catholic, all-girls high school in Livonia (closed in 2018)
- St. Edith and St. Michael Catholic grade schools
  - St. Michael the Archangel School - The school began on September 21, 1942, and the building used for the school had a second story installed after the archdiocese granted permission for this on November 9, 1943. The addition was installed from January to May 1944. There were 345 students for the 1944–1945 school year. On September 24, 1997, construction began for a new addition with a cost of $3.4 million. Construction finished before September 8, 1998, with dedication on October 11 of that year. The addition included a cafeteria, a library, a gymnasium, a computer lab, and six classrooms.
- Peace Lutheran School (Pre-K-8) and St. Paul's Lutheran School (Pre-K-8) are affiliated with the Wisconsin Evangelical Lutheran Synod.

St. Genevieve Catholic School closed in 2016.

== Media ==
The Metro Detroit–area newspapers are the Detroit Free Press and The Detroit News. The Livonia Observer is printed twice a week, on Thursdays and Sundays.

The newspaper Between the Lines and the website PrideSource are headquartered in Livonia.

== Infrastructure ==
=== Transportation ===
Livonia has limited access to public bus service through the Detroit Department of Transportation.

In 2012, the National Motorists Association released the results of a public poll on the "Worst Speed Trap Cities" in North America. Livonia was listed at #2.

== Notable people ==
- Janet M. Anderson, commercial artist who depicted Detroit
- Adam Bedell, soccer player
- Chuck Behler, musician, drummer for Megadeth 1987–1989
- Doug Brzezinski, former NFL player for the Philadelphia Eagles and the Carolina Panthers
- Bernie Carbo, Major League Baseball outfielder from 1969 to 1980 (Franklin High School Class of 1965)
- Jeff Cassar, soccer player and coach
- Charlie Collins, member of the Arkansas House of Representatives from Fayetteville
- Chris Conner, professional hockey player for the Washington Capitals
- Brian Conz, racing driver
- Mike Cox, former Attorney General of Michigan
- Nancy Jane Dean, teacher and Presbyterian missionary in Persia
- Warren Defever, musician and producer
- Mike Donnelly, professional hockey player for five NHL teams
- Kaley Doyle, professional hockey player in the PWHL
- Judy Greer, actress (graduated from Churchill high school)
- Charlie Haeger, pitcher for three Major League Baseball teams
- Al Iafrate, professional hockey player for four NHL teams
- Ryan Kesler, professional hockey player for the Anaheim Ducks
- Jeff Lerg, professional hockey player for the New Jersey Devils
- Mike Modano, professional hockey player, inducted into Hockey Hall of Fame
- David Moss, hockey player for the Phoenix Coyotes
- Cecilia Muñoz, director of the White House Domestic Policy Council
- Alfred Noble, civil engineer, known for work on the Soo Locks and the Panama Canal
- Aaron Palushaj, professional hockey player for the Brynäs IF
- FP Santangelo, Major League Baseball player 1995–2001
- Tracie Savage, actress and journalist
- Dana Schutz, painter
- Tim Shaw, professional football player for four NFL teams
- Chris Tancill, professional hockey player for four NHL teams
- Sheila Taormina, athlete, 1996 Summer Olympics swimming gold medalist in 4 x 200 meter freestyle relay; four-time Olympian (1996, 2000, 2004, and 2008 Summer Olympics); first woman to qualify in three different Olympic sports events (freestyle swimming, triathlon and modern pentathlon)
- Caleb Tiernan, National Football League player for the Minnesota Vikings
- Ken Westerfield, disc sport (Frisbee) pioneer, athlete
- Jonathan B. Wright, stage and film actor

== Images ==
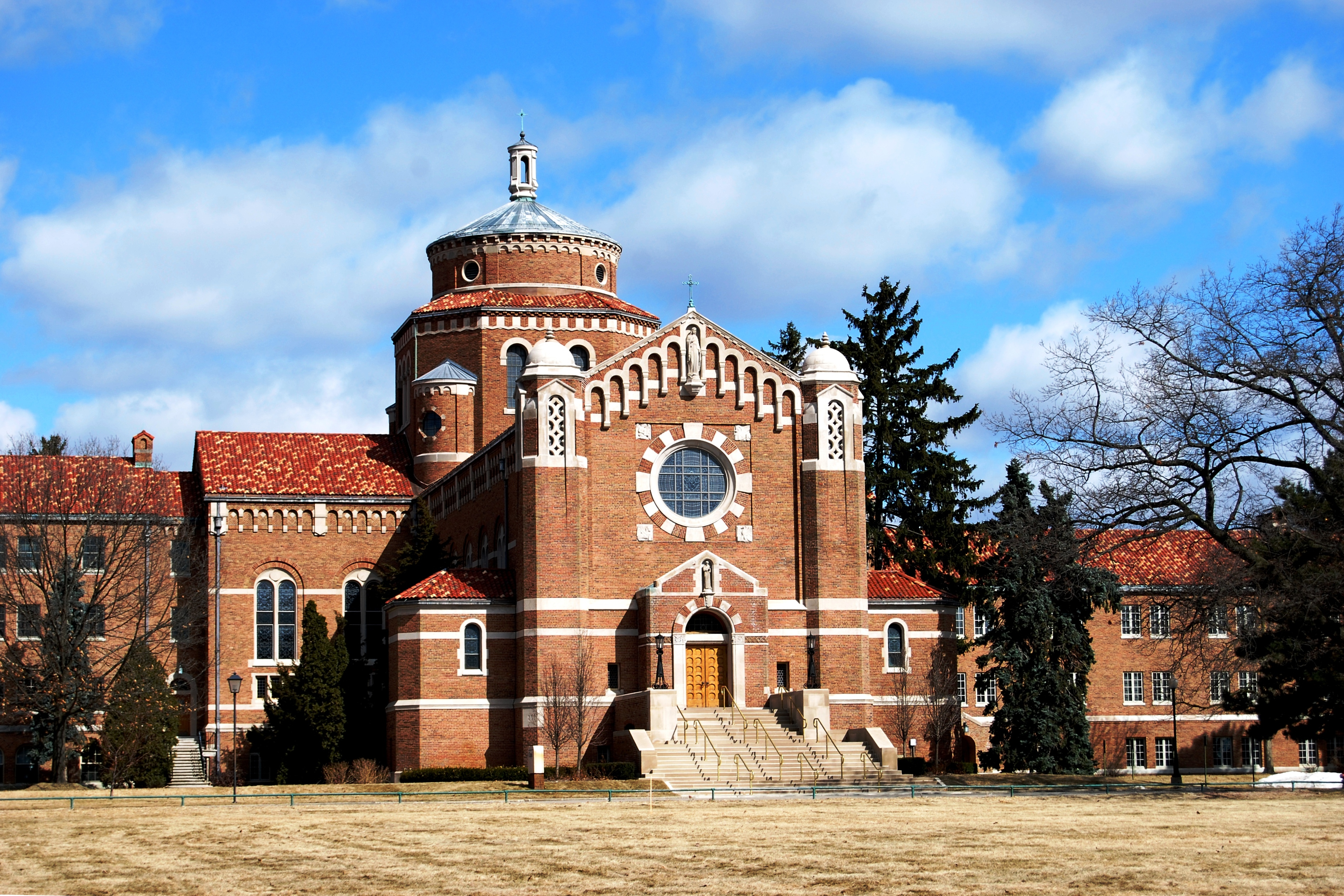
Chapel (1961) of the Felician Sisters in Livonia, Michigan – architectural sculpture by Corrado Parducci

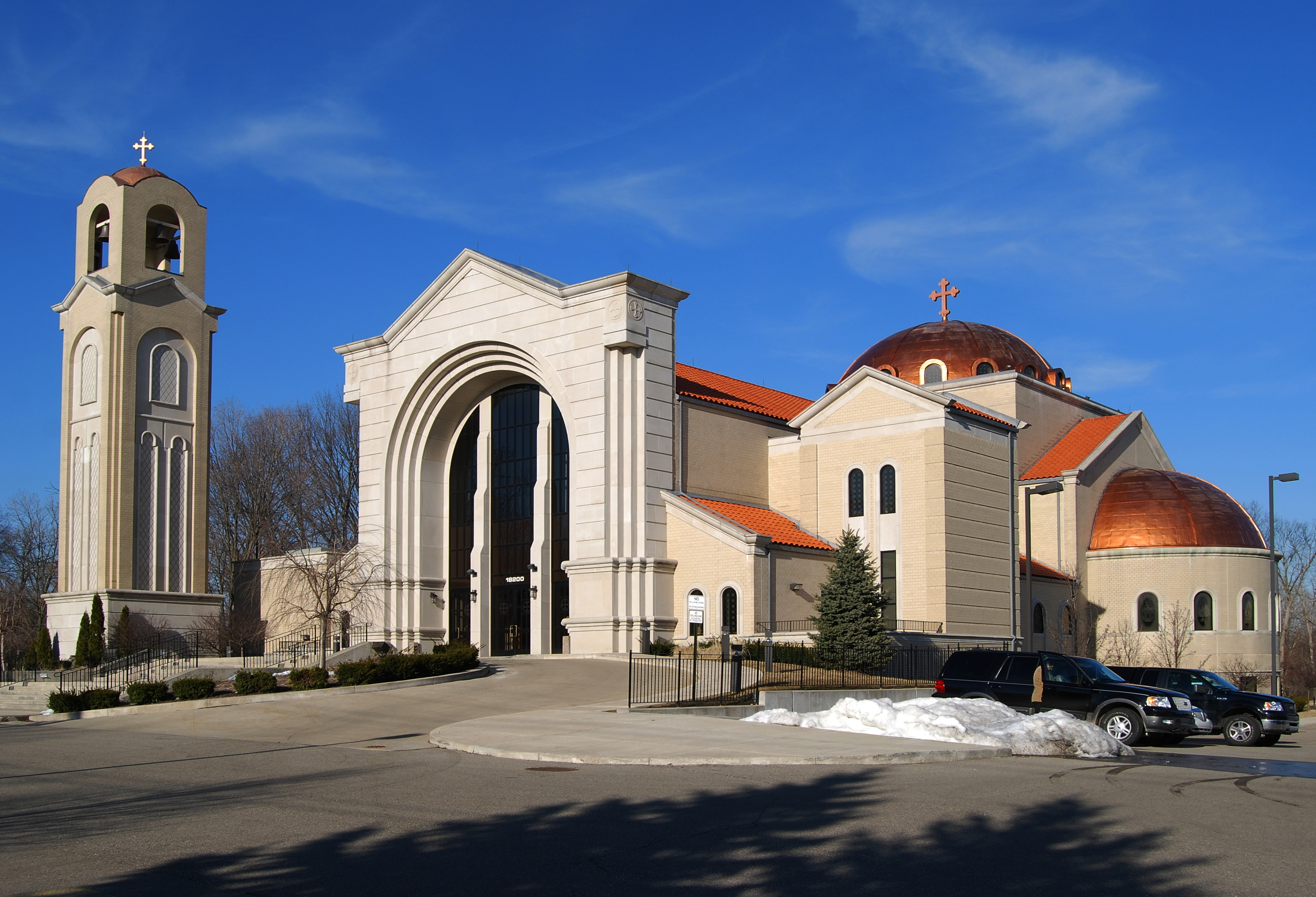
Saint Mary's Antiochian Orthodox Christian Church

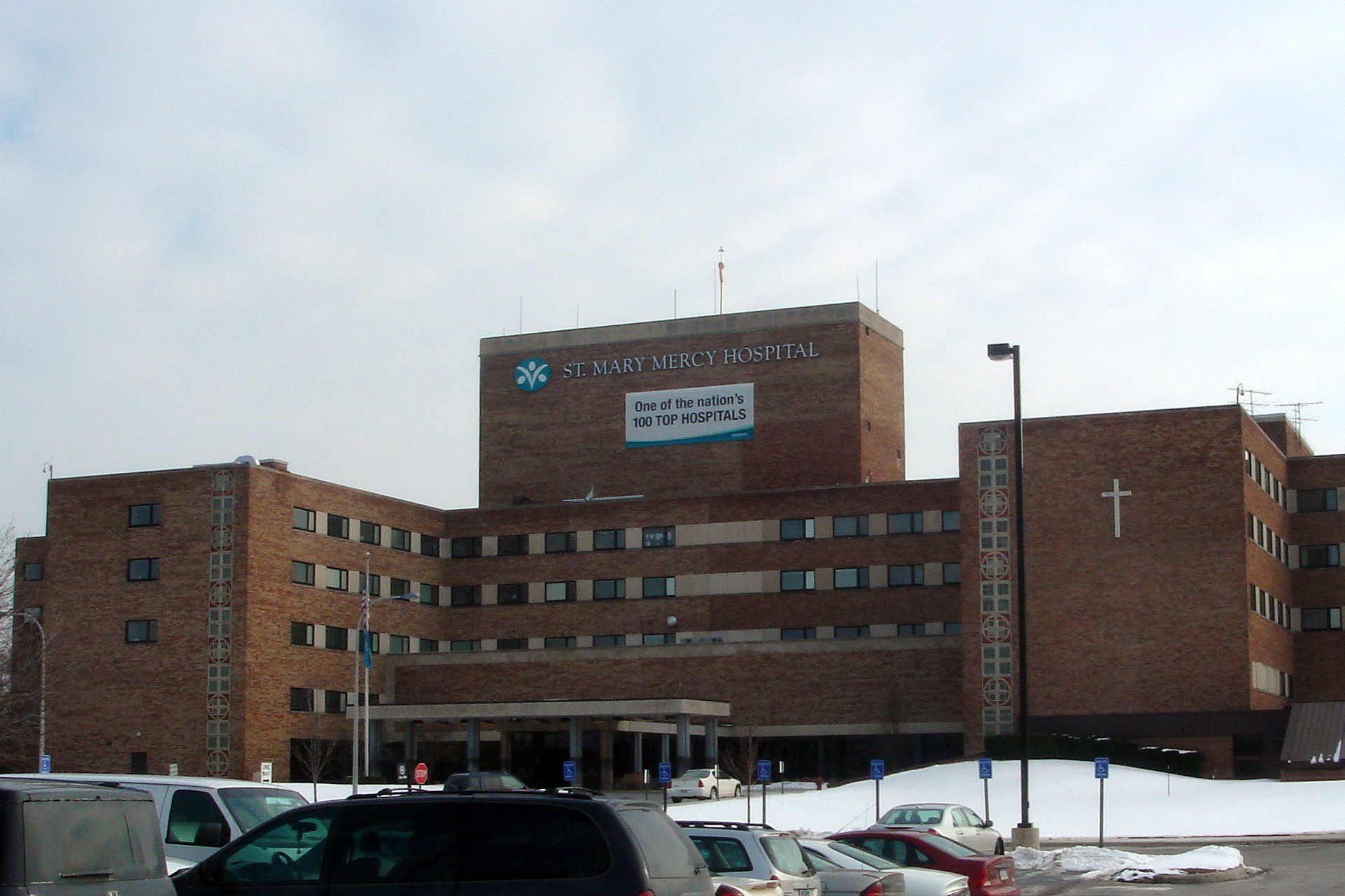
St. Mary Mercy Hospital

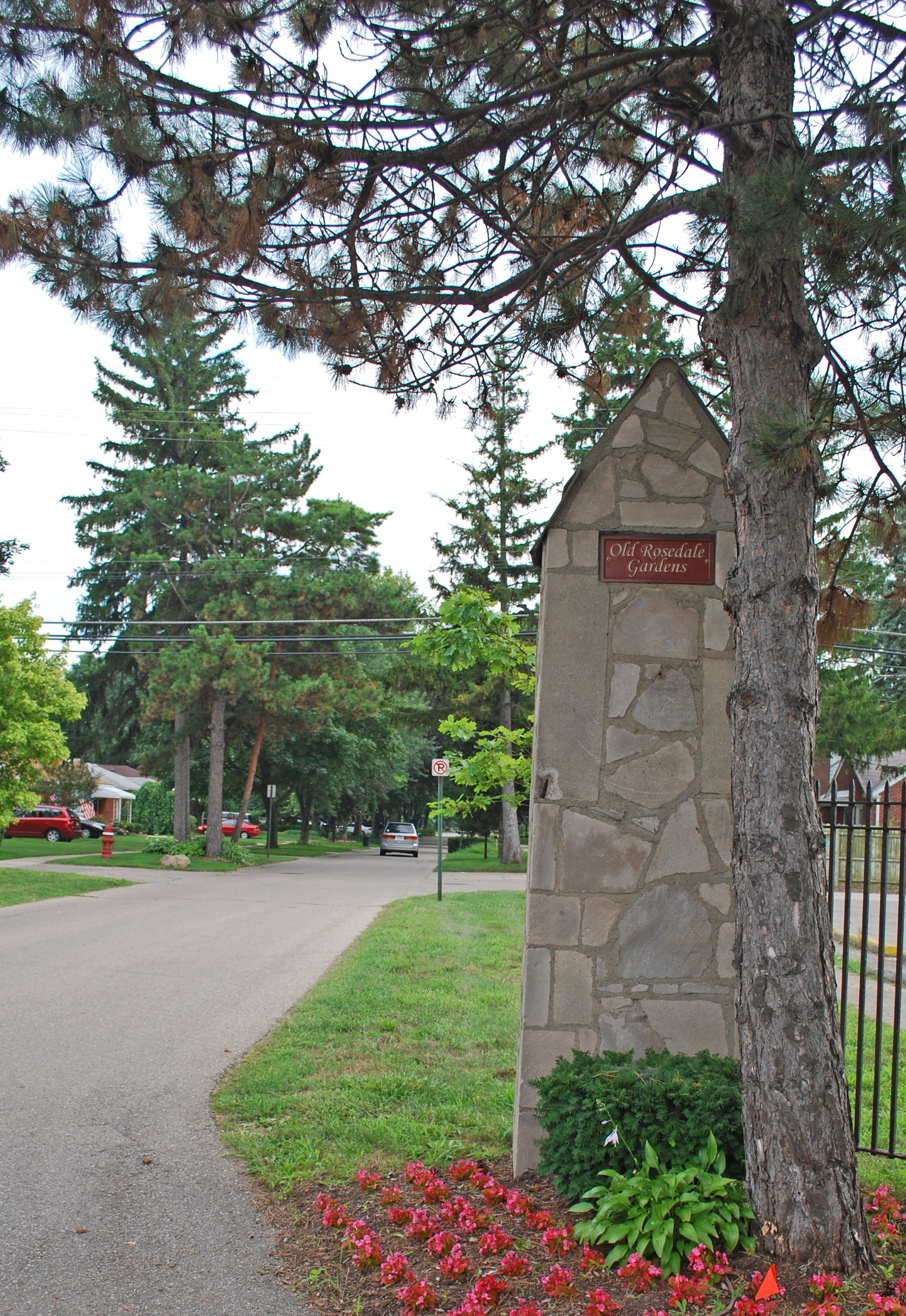
Entrance to neighborhood at Berwick and Plymouth in Rosedale Gardens Historic District

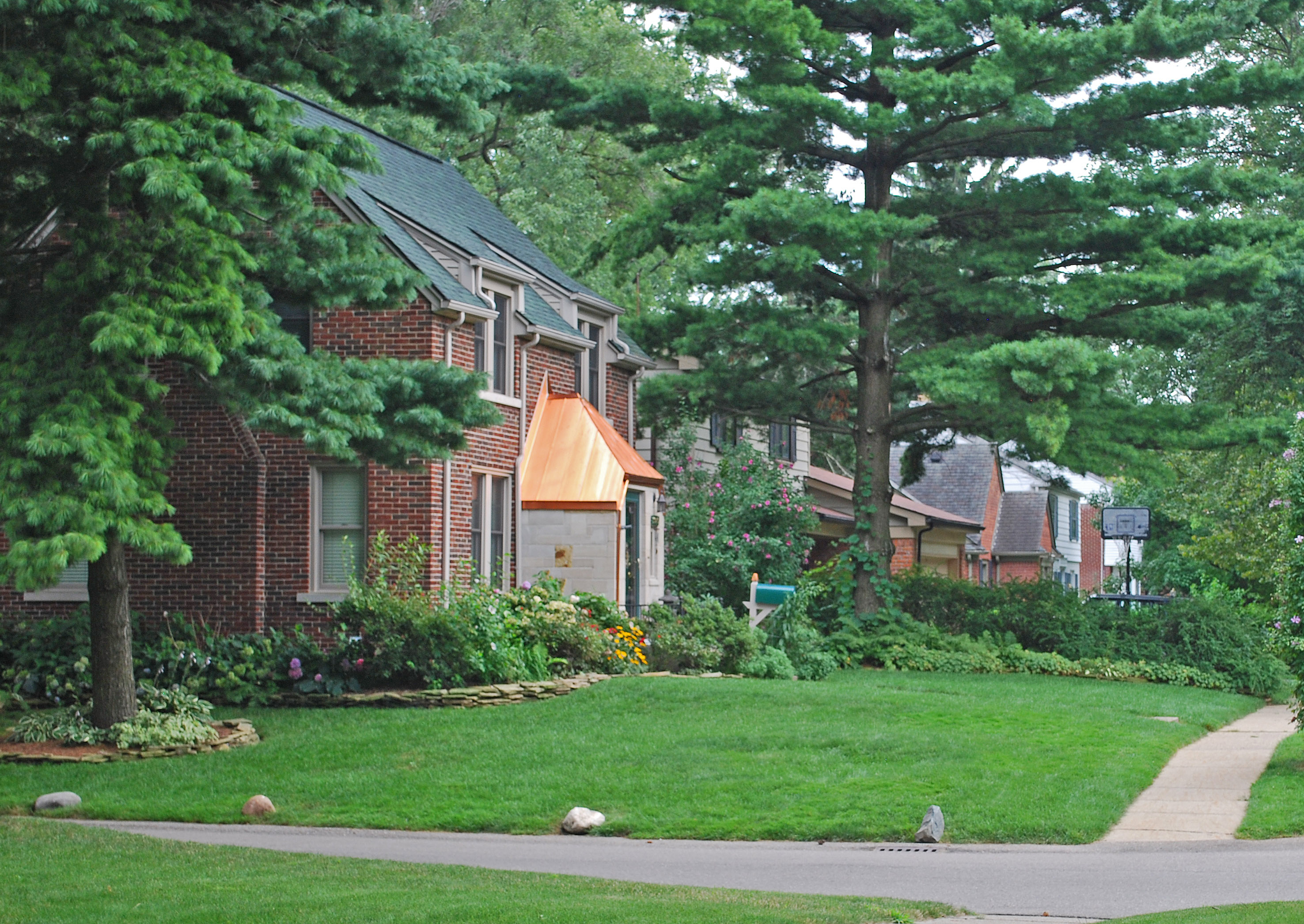
Street scene on Auburndale in Rosedale Gardens Historic District

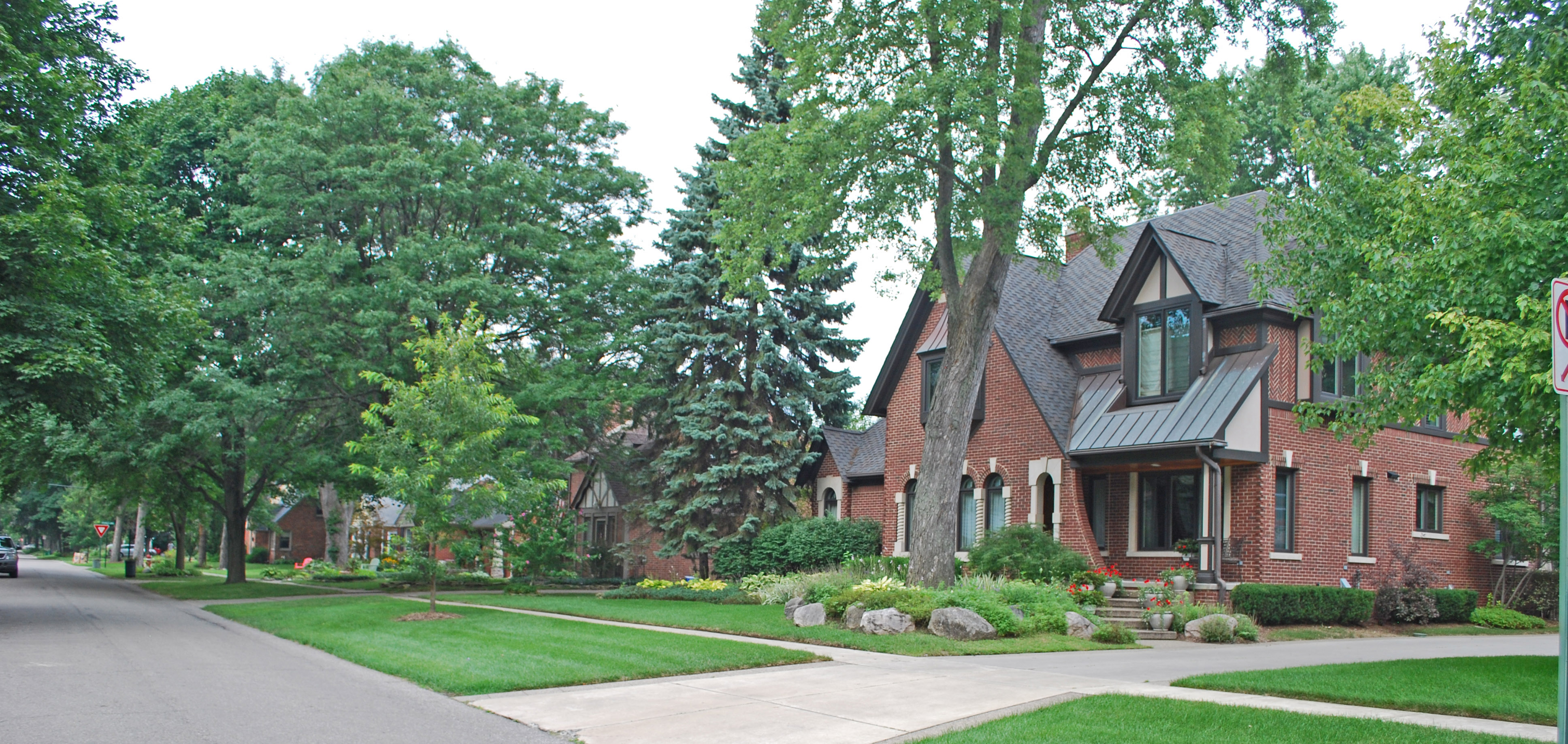
Street scene on Auburndale in Rosedale Gardens Historic District

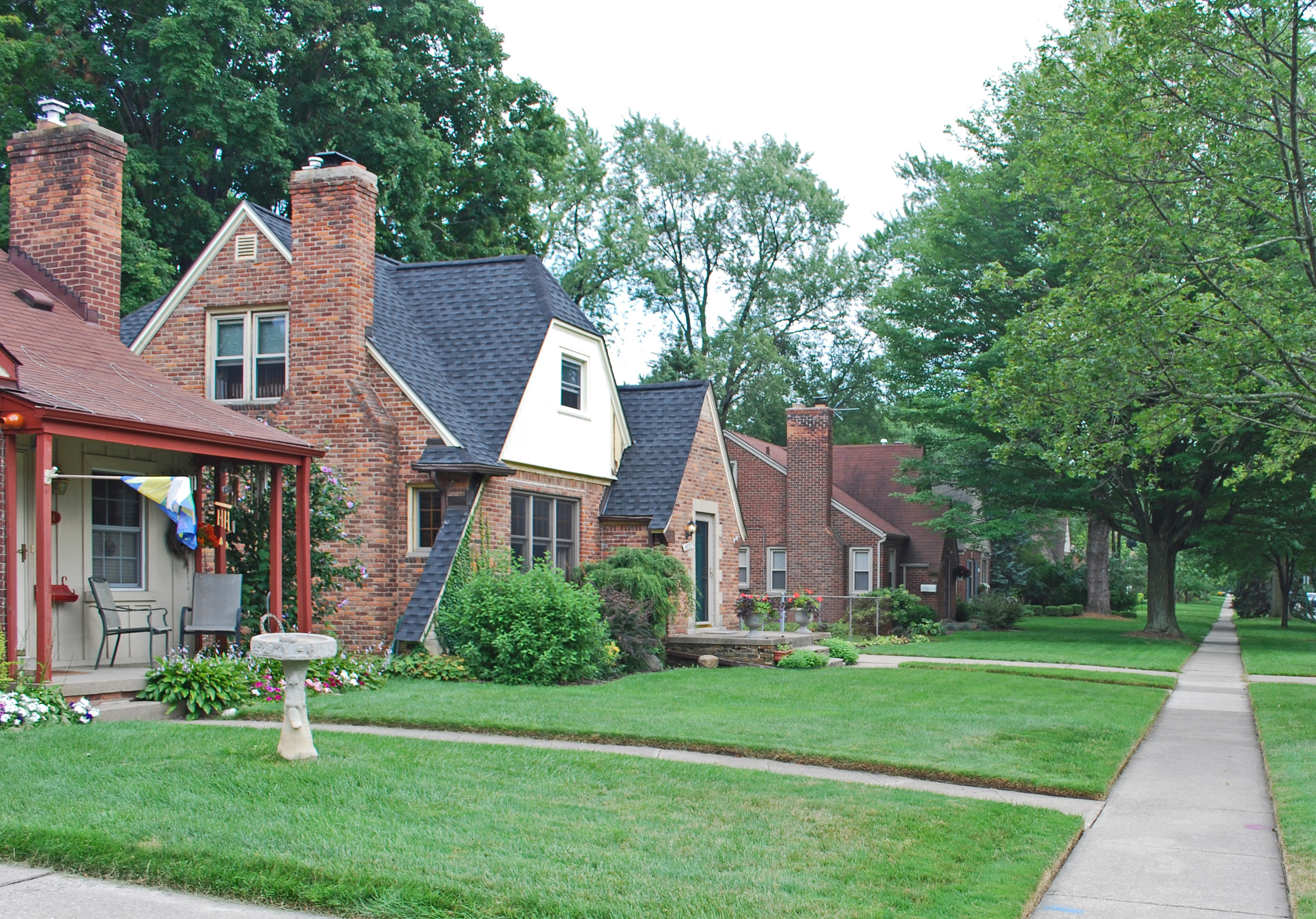
Rosedale Gardens Historic District

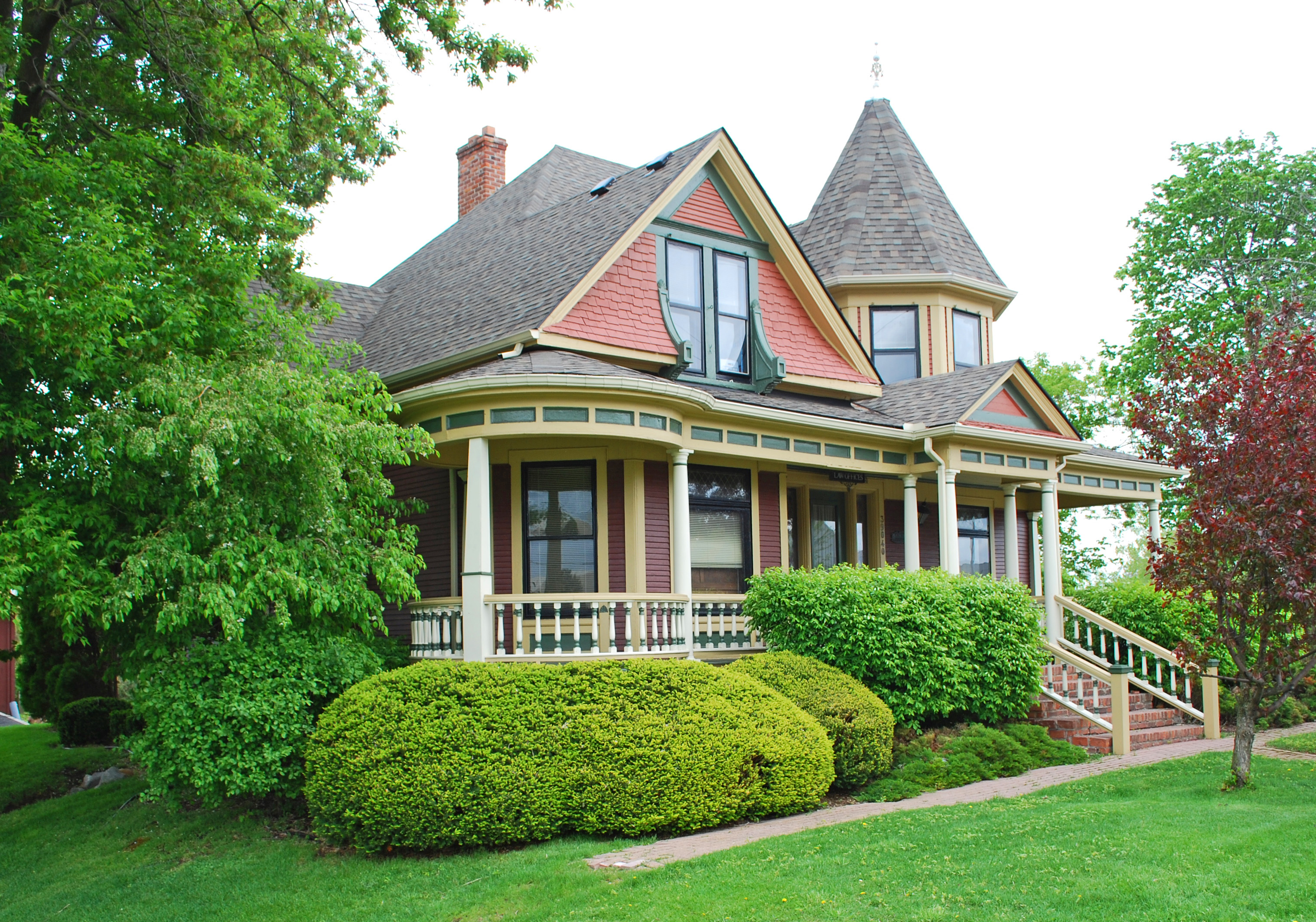
Orson Everitt House historic site

== See also ==
- Wilson Barn – a historic barn in Livonia
