= Adlai E. Stevenson High School (Livonia, Michigan) =

Public school in Livonia, Michigan, US

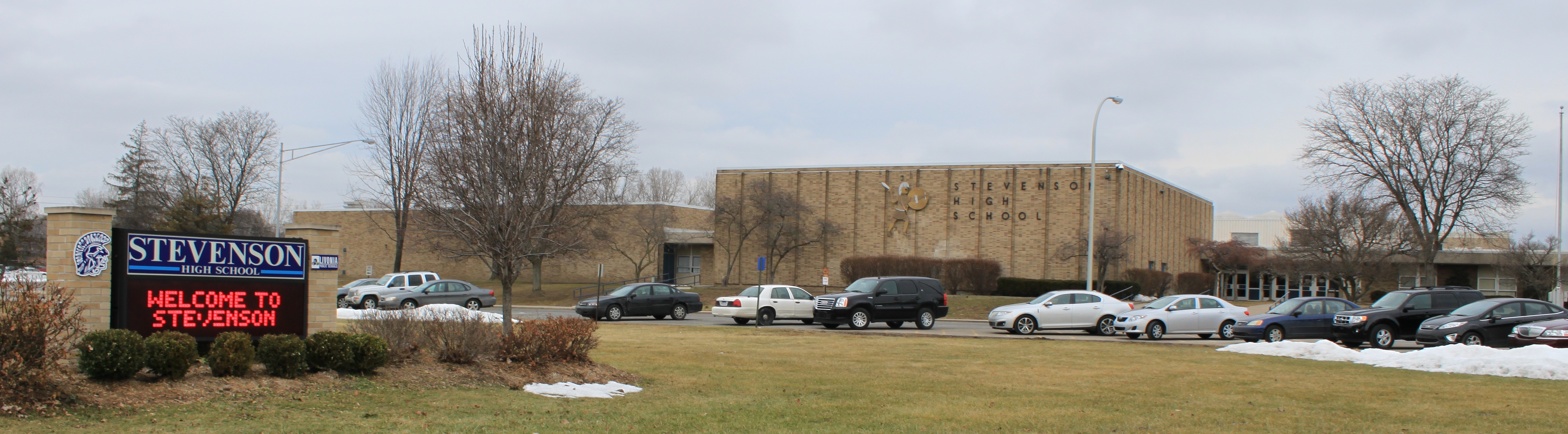

Location
- 33500 Six Mile Road; Livonia, Michigan 48152; United States; 42°24′44″N 83°22′58″W

Information
- Type: Public school
- Motto: Striving for excellence; learning for life.
- Established: 1965
- School district: Livonia Public Schools
- Principal: Pete Mazzoni
- Teaching staff: 71.45 (FTE)
- Grades: 9–12
- Enrollment: 1,590 (2023–2024)
- Student to teacher ratio: 22.25
- Colors: Columbia blue, navy blue and white
- Athletics conference: Kensington Lakes Activities Association
- Nickname: Spartans
- Newspaper: Spotlight
- Yearbook: Aurora
- Website: stevenson.livoniapublicschools.org

Student assessments
- 2021–22 school year Change vs. prior year

M-STEP 11th grade proficiency rates (Science / Social Studies)
- Advanced %: 19.0 / 12.1
- Proficient %: 31.8 / 33.3
- PR. Proficient %: 16.4 / 44.4
- Not Proficient %: 32.8 / 10.3

Average test scores
- SAT Total: 1024.2 (▼ −43.9)

Adlai E. Stevenson High School is a public high school located in Livonia, Michigan, a suburb west of Detroit.

== History ==
Adlai E. Stevenson High School was built in 1965 to accommodate the rising population of Livonia with the increased migration of people from Detroit to the suburbs during the 1960s. It was dedicated on October 24, 1965, United Nations Day, and the 20th anniversary of that body's founding, by Vice President Hubert H. Humphrey. Stevenson was the first high school in the nation to be named for the Fifth U.S. Ambassador to the United Nations, Adlai E. Stevenson, who had died the day before the Livonia school board decided on naming the new high school.

== Athletics ==
Stevenson is a Class A athletic school and is part of the Kensington Lakes Activities Association playing in the new East division formed in 2018. Stevenson will join the Lakes Valley Conference in 2026.

=== Championships ===
- Boys ice hockey state champions in 2013
- Boys soccer state champions in 1982, 1985, 1986, 1988, 1991, 1996
- Girls soccer state champions in 1990, 1997, 1998
- Girls Pom Pon division two state champions in 1998, and 2019
