= Sista Otis =

American musician, singer and songwriter

Sista Otis (born Shawn Marie Tinnes) is an American musician, singer and songwriter.

== Career ==
In 2004 Sista Otis released her debut award winning studio album, Worldwide Release. The album received the highest number of Detroit Music Awards' nominations in the award's thirteen-year history while also receiving airplay in 12 different countries and coast to coast coverage on college and public radio in the United States. She was mentioned in Rolling Stone, and soon after The Advocate named her as one of the top Indie Artists in the U.S. In addition to her personal artistic efforts, she founded "Sista Otis and the Traveling Folk Review", part of the Urban Folk Movement, which toured the country in the late 1990s and early 2000s and showcased local Detroit talent. Most recently Otis performed with Jefferson Starship at the House Of Blues, headlined the cast and crew party for The Dark Knight featuring Heath Ledger and was a special guest of Little Richard at the Grand Ole Opry in Nashville, Tenn.

== Discography ==
- Untitled * - 1999
- Sista Otis and the Traveling Folk Review (2000) - Various Artists - Wholly Roller Records
- Sista Otis and the Traveling Folk Review #2 (2001) - Various Artists - Wholly Roller Records
- On a Shoe String (2003) - Sista Otis - Wholly Roller Records
- Worldwide Release (2004) - Sista Otis - Wholly Roller Records
- Live! @ Eddies Attic EP (2007) - Sista Otis - Wholly Roller Records
- Sista Otis LIVE on MNF Radio (2009 W) - Sista Otis - Wholly Roller Records

== Sources ==
- A Higher Plane
- Where Y'at
- Awards and Press
- Sonic Bids
