= Trish Brown =

Education advocate

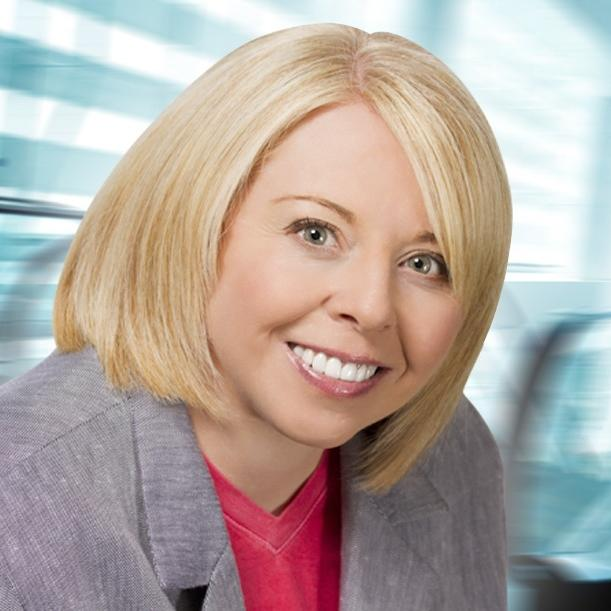
- Born: Patricia Brown; October 11, 1963 (age 62); Windsor, Ontario, Canada
- Education: Eastern Michigan University

Patricia "Trish" Brown (born October 11, 1963) is a national education advocate, public relations practitioner, journalist, and entrepreneur.

Brown served as the first openly lesbian school board president in the State of Michigan from 1996 to 1997 at the Wayne-Westland Community Schools. As the news editor at Associated Newspapers, Brown helped win the Excellence in Journalism award from the University Press of Michigan in 1990 and 1991. In October 2012, Brown was awarded the Western Wayne NAACP "Great Expectations" award for her work on behalf of minorities. Brown worked as a publicist for the Osmond family, an American family music group, and helped write and produce Merrill Osmond's single America.

== Early life ==
Brown was born in Windsor, Ontario, on October 11, 1963, as Patricia Ann Brown. Her mother, Margaret Leslie Hardie, from Edinburgh, Scotland, and her father, Robert Brown, from Rutherglen, Scotland, both immigrated to Windsor, Ontario where they met. When she was a year old, the family moved to Detroit, Michigan. Brown is a naturalized citizen of the United States of America.

Brown was an only child in a middle-class home. She lived in Detroit until she was nine years old. While in Detroit, Brown went to Kosciusko Elementary School from kindergarten to 3rd grade and Evergreen Lutheran Elementary School for 4th grade. When Brown was nine, the family moved to Westland, Michigan, where she attended McKee Elementary School, Nankin Mills Junior High School, and John Glenn High School.

Brown attended Eastern Michigan University in 1982 and graduated in 1989. At Eastern Michigan University, Brown earned a BS in public relations with a minor in industrial technology with a concentration in construction management.

== Career ==
=== Reporting ===
Brown started her reporting career in 1988 at the Plymouth-Canton Crier newspaper in Plymouth, Michigan.

In 1990, Brown left the Crier to work for Associated Newspapers in Wayne, Michigan. Associated Newspapers published the Westland Eagle, Wayne Eagle, Canton Eagle, Inkster Ledger Star, Romulus Roman, Belleville Enterprise, and the Sunday Enterprise.

After 18 months of working at Associated Newspapers, Brown was named news editor and helped win the Excellence in Journalism award from the University Press of Michigan for the Westland Eagle in 1990 and 1991. The Excellence in Journalism award was given to the best newspaper in the state. While working at Associated Newspapers, one of her reporting duties was covering the Wayne-Westland Community Schools, from which she graduated. In March 1993, she decided to leave Associated Newspapers to seek election to the Wayne-Westland Community Schools Board of Education.

=== Wayne-Westland school board ===
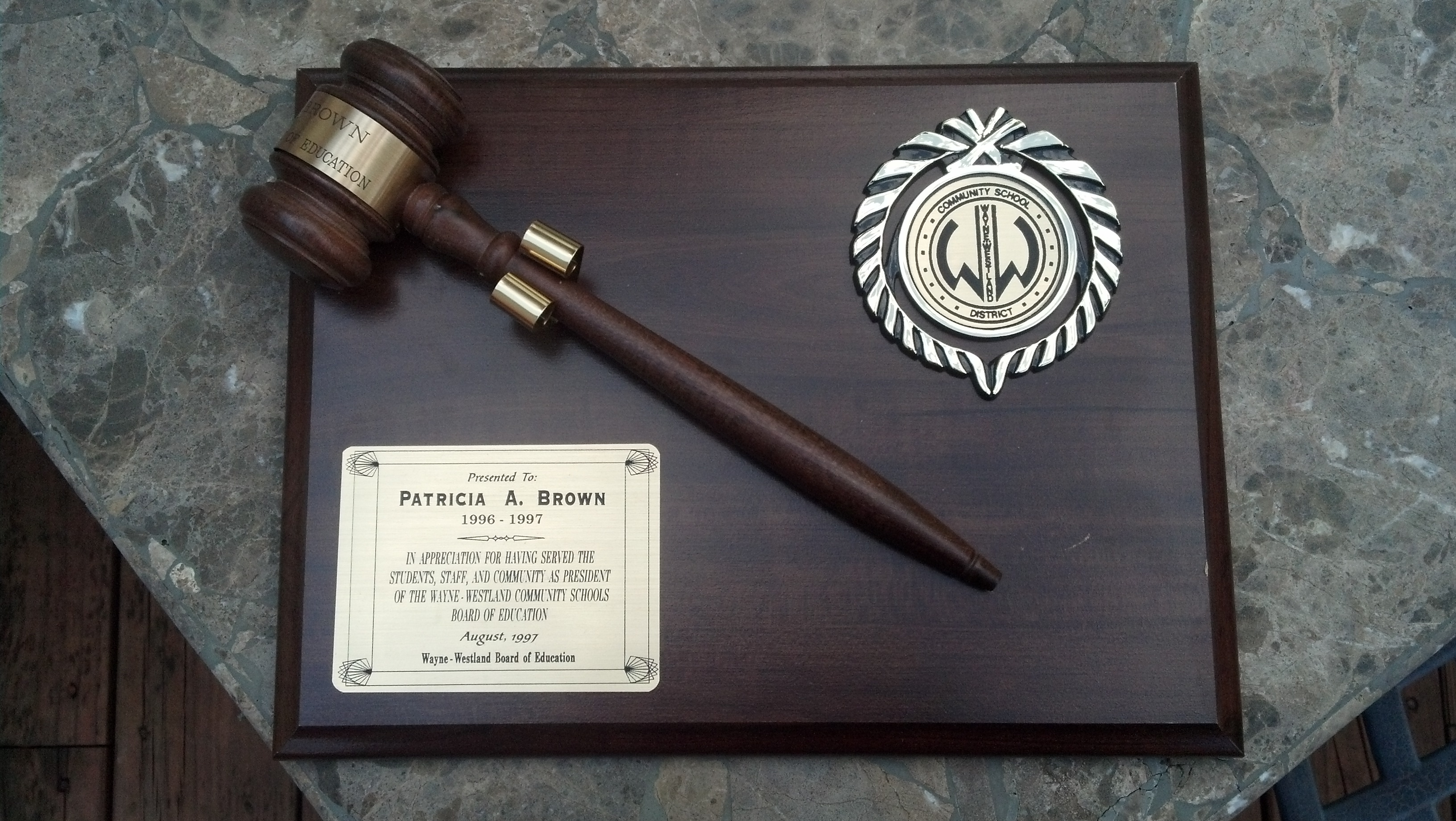
Trish Brown's plague for her service as the Wayne-Westland Community Schools school board president.

On June 10, 1993, Brown was elected to the Wayne-Westland Board of Education. At the time, the district had a $12 million budget deficit. Brown took the oath of office July 1, 1993, and was elected to serve as treasurer by her board colleagues. She also was elected treasurer by fellow board members in 1994, and in 1995 she was elected vice president of the board and in 1996, she was elected president of the school board and became the first openly lesbian school board president in the State of Michigan.

While serving on the Wayne-Westland Community Schools board, Brown was also appointed to the Wayne County Elections Commission in 1994 and the Westland Local Development Finance Authority in 1995.

On January 17, 1997, as the president of the board, Brown was one of seven members to vote yes to include sexual orientation among the district's anti-discrimination policies alongside race, religion, age, and physical appearance. In 1997, Brown lobbied Michigan Governor John Engler to secure an additional $100 million over 10 years in funding for the district, now known as the Wayne-Westland Equity Language.

==== Re-election campaign ====
In May 1997, Brown was seeking reelection to the board of education when she was attacked by several right-wing Christian groups for her sexual orientation and for voting in favor of the policy. A flyer titled "Take a Hike Dyke" was circulated throughout the community, urging voters to not vote for Brown because of her sexual orientation. Additionally, a religious decree was issued by the self-proclaimed Wayne County "Bible Court" comparing electing Brown to the position to hiring an "alcoholic to drive a school bus or a pedophile to work in a day care center".

Brown lost the election by 110 votes. Shortly after Brown's term expired, the policy protecting homosexuals from harassment was removed by a 6–1 vote.

==== 1998 election and lawsuit ====
Brown ran for a seat on the Wayne-Westland Community Schools board one final time in the 1998 election and failed to garner many votes. At the same time, Brown filed a civil suit against the Bible Court, seeking damages "in excess of $25,000". The clerk of the Bible Court, Peter James Narsisian, issued an apology and resigned from his position in July 1997.

=== Public relations ===
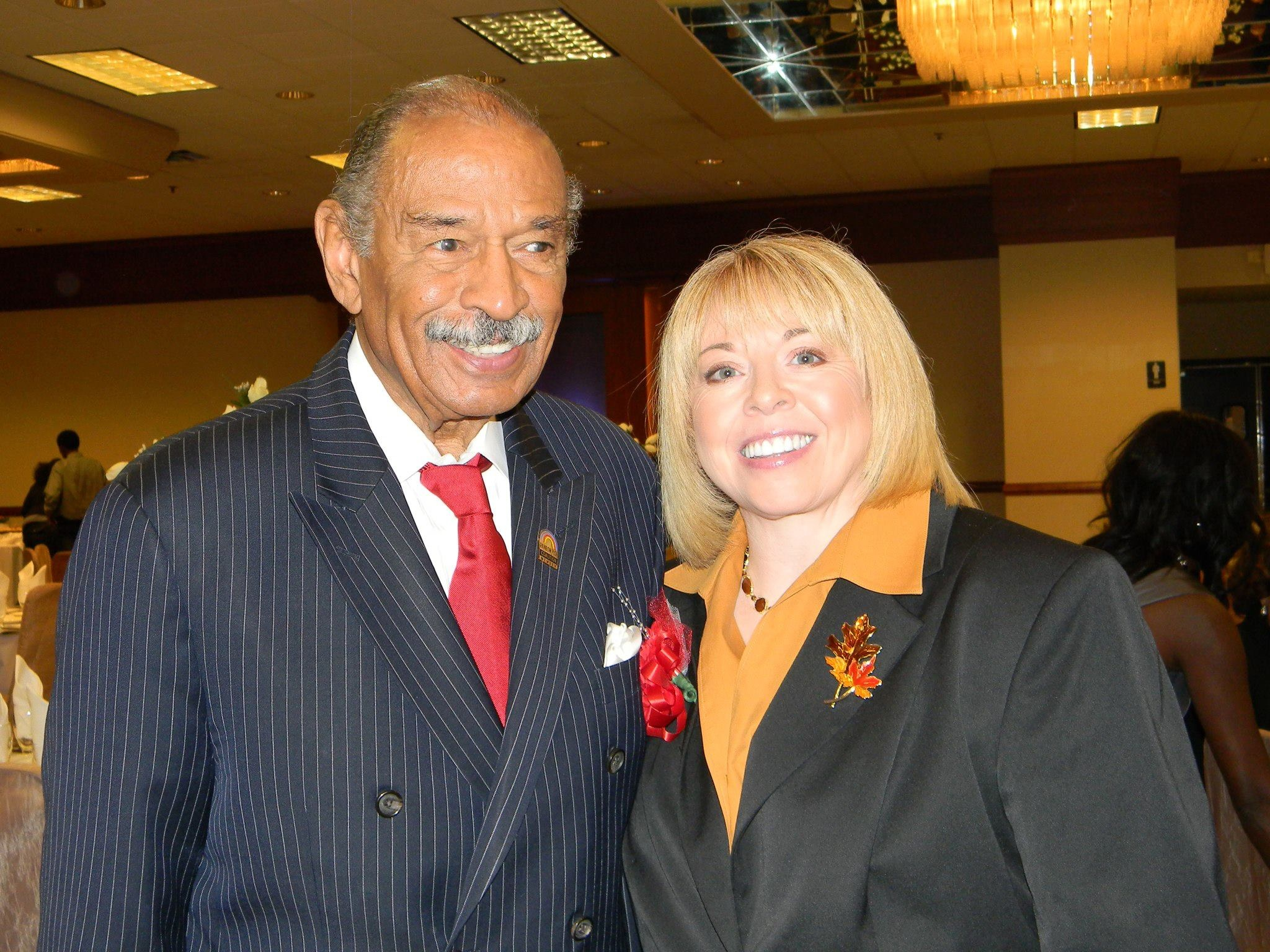
Trish Brown and Congressman John Conyers at the Western-Wayne NAACP Freedom Fund Dinner in 2012. Brown was awarded the "Great Expectations" award.

Brown started her public relations firm, Communication Concepts, in 1993. Brown has provided services for numerous colleges, universities, school districts, state officials, members of congress, and businesses. In 2000, she served as the Osmonds' publicist and public relations strategist for their "Back On The Road Again" Tour.

In 2001, Brown worked with Merrill Osmond to help write and produce the single America. Many of the proceeds went to benefit the Families of Freedom Scholarship Fund. The purpose of the fund is to "provide education assistance for postsecondary study to financially needy dependents of those people killed or permanently disabled as a result of the terrorist attacks on September 11, 2001, and during the rescue activities relating to those attacks."

Up until January 2019, Brown owned and operated TPE Multimedia, a public relations and multimedia firm. Today she is the COO of Beyorch, a Los Angeles-based Private Equity firm that caters to investment opportunities for the middle class and raises funds for businesses from $50 million up to $500 million. Brown also created The TPEPost.com, an online news magazine that reports news from Los Angeles and Detroit. The TPE entity was created when Trish Brown started the Tipping Point Education foundation in 2010.

In 2012, Brown was awarded the Great Expectations Award from the Western Wayne chapter of the National Association for the Advancement of Colored People.

==== Wayne County Community College District ====
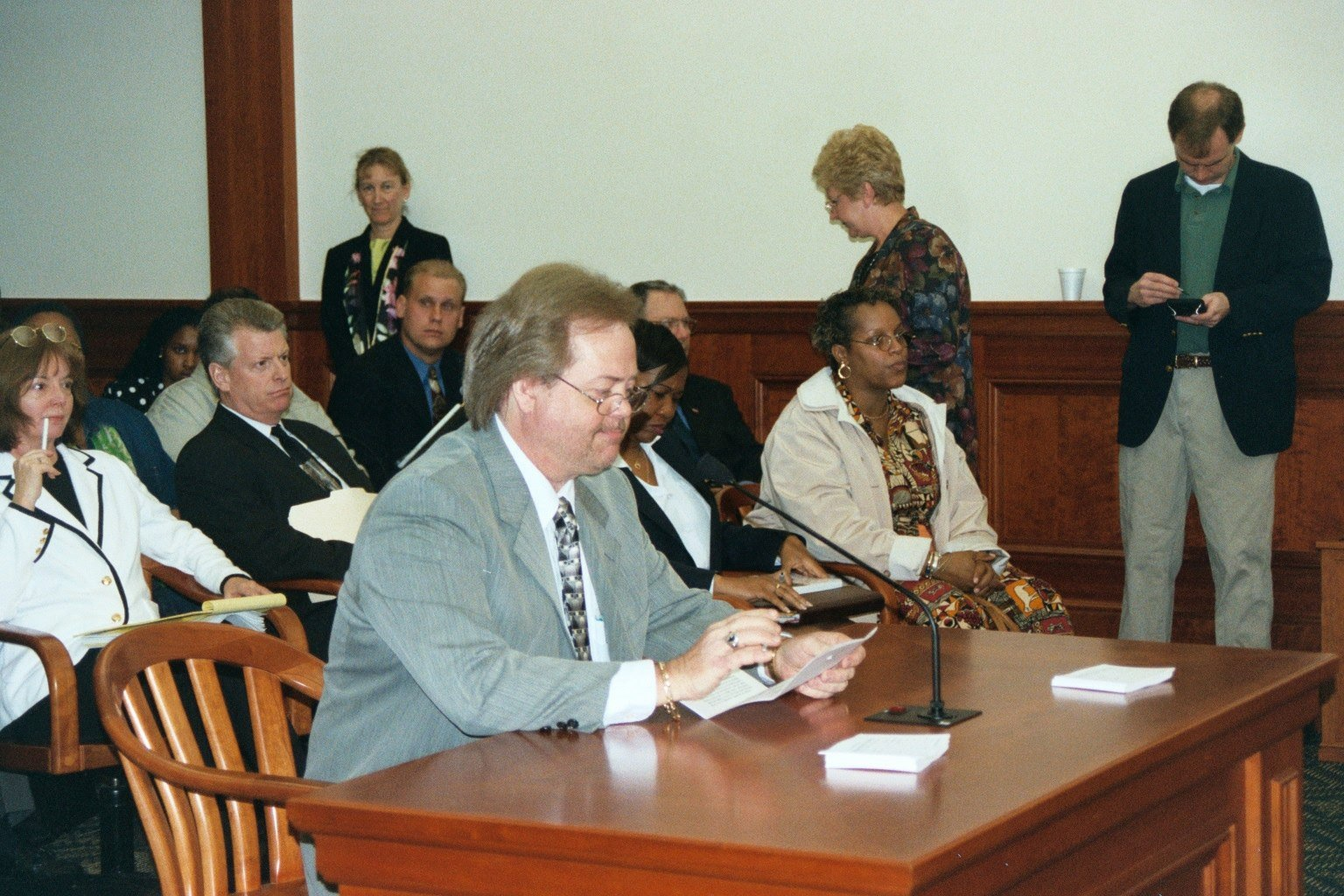
Merrill Osmond testifying on behalf of Wayne County Community College District

In 1993, Brown began working as a consultant for the Wayne County Community College District through her public relations firm, Communication Concepts.

Throughout her contract with Wayne County Community College, Brown led these successful millage campaigns:

- A proposal to make the previous 1-mill proposal passed in 1992 permanent (1998).
- A proposal to add 1.5 mills for 10 years (2001).
- A proposal to extend the 2001 1.5 mill proposal until 2021 at a reduced rate of 1.25 mills (2008).
- A proposal to add 1 mill for 10 years to fund general operating purposes (2012).

In 1999, she stopped Ford Motor Company, the UAW union, and the State of Michigan from building a technical center within the tax boundaries of the district.

In late 2001, legislation was introduced that compromised the newly passed millage and would force the college to close if passed. Brown worked with Merrill Osmond, who testified before the legislature to stop lawmakers and Michigan Governor John Engler from closing the school and explained how the new funding would be beneficial to residents in the community college boundaries in Wayne County.

Through millage proposal estimates and saving the 2001 millage from being removed, Brown has raised approximately $2 billion in funding for Wayne County Community College District.

== Personal life ==
Brown currently resides in the Los Angeles area and formerly of the Metro Detroit area Canton, Michigan. She has two daughters with her ex-partner of 28 years. Brown and her ex-partner also had a still-born son.
