= Norwayne =

Norwayne can refer to:

- Norwayne Historic District, a residential historic district in Westland, Michigan
- Norwayne Middle School, a school in Wayne County, North Carolina
- Norwayne High School, a school in Creston, Ohio
