= Annapolis Park Historic District =

Historic district in Michigan, United States

- U.S. National Register of Historic Places
- U.S. Historic district
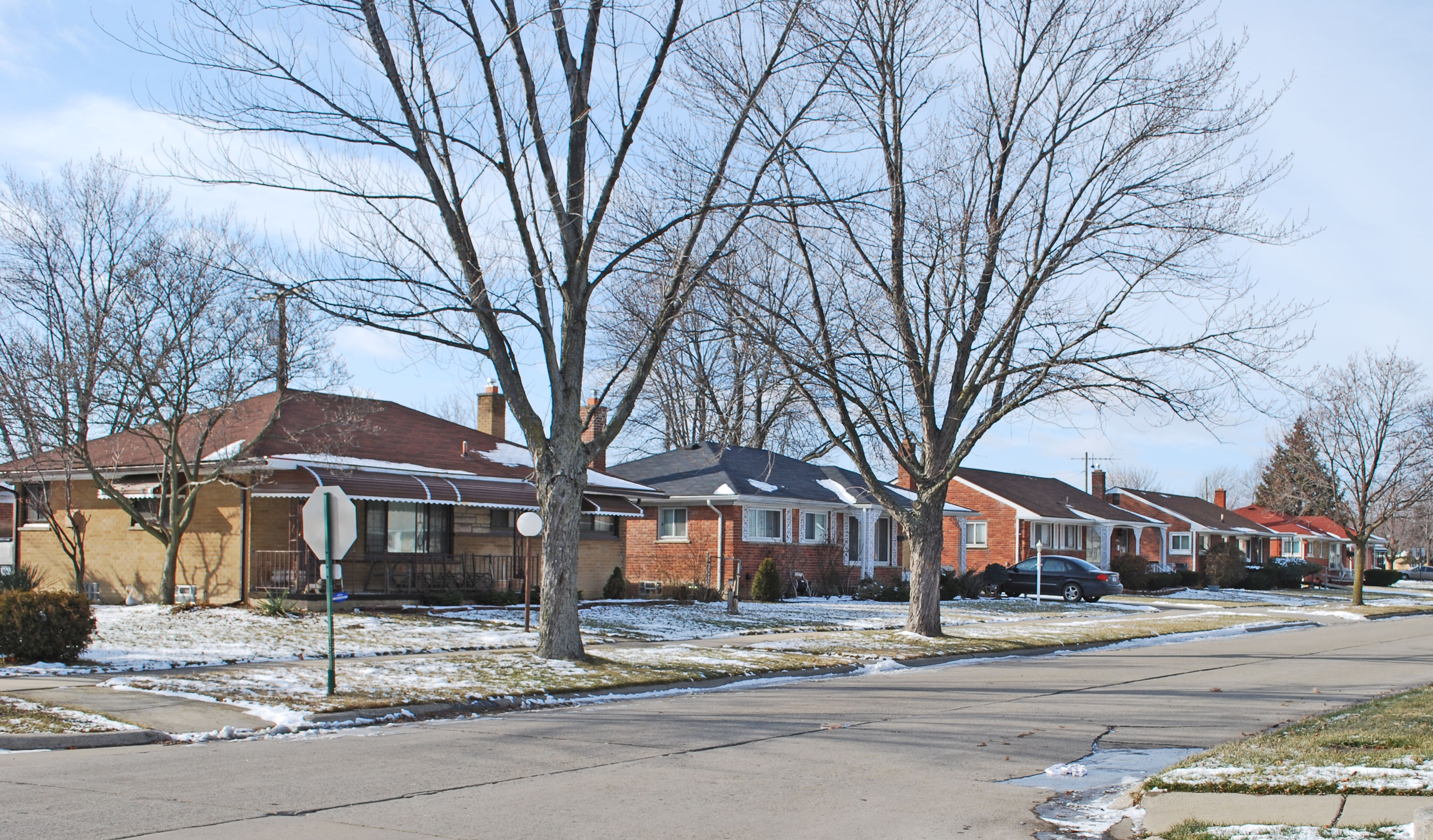
- Looking east on Hanover

- Location within Michigan Location within the United States
- Interactive map
- Location: Julius, Matthew, Hanover, Farnum, Alan, and Paul, Westland, Michigan
- Coordinates: 42°16′14″N 83°19′59″W
- Area: 71 acres (29 ha)
- Built: 1953
- Architectural style: Modern Movement
- NRHP reference No.: 06000405
- Added to NRHP: May 18, 2006

The Annapolis Park Historic District is a historic district located along Julius, Matthew, Hanover, Farnum, Alan, and Paul Streets in Westland, Michigan, covering 71 acres (290,000 m^{2}) and 354 buildings. It was listed on the National Register of Historic Places in 2006.

== History ==
During World War II, the African-American population in Detroit ballooned to 300,000 residents. However, blacks were restricted in where they could live due to housing covenants, overpriced rent, and other forms of discrimination. To alleviate the shortage of housing space, Julius and William Schwartz platted the Annapolis Park suburb in what was then Nankin Township and is now Westland, specifically for African-Americans. The neighborhood was platted in three sections: one in 1953, one in 1954, and one in 1955. A fourth Annapolis Park platting, in 1961, is not included in the Historic District. When local banks proved reluctant to provide mortgages to prospective home owners, the Schwartzes also established the Franklin Mortgage Company to make loans to residents.

Annapolis Park was quickly successful, with the first two houses constructed in 1953, 134 more built in 1954, 168 more during 1955, and 51 houses built in 1956–57, completely filling the subdivision. It is likely that a substantial percentage of the original homeowners were World War II veterans who used the mortgage guarantee provisions of the GI Bill to purchase their house. Sales were apparently mostly by word of mouth, but the availability of adequate financing and the efforts of part-time salesmen Jimmy Nelms (the first African American male school teacher in the Wayne school system) Levi Jackson (a former Yale football captain) boosted sales.

Annapolis Park residents formed the Southeast Homeowners Association (now the Southeast Westland Homeowners Association) in 1955 to promote community unity. In 1966, the city of Westland was incorporated from the remainder of the former Nankin Township, and Annapolis Park was included. Today's Annapolis Park is an attractive, well-cared-for neighborhood, which includes many descendants of the first homeowners.

== Description ==
Annapolis Park contains 354 houses situated along a series of curved streets. The houses are ranch houses, primarily with brick exteriors, and all constructed in 1953–57. Lots are roughly 50–60 feet wide and 110–140 feet deep, and typically slightly irregular due to the curved streets. Although the houses are of uniform size and placement, the curving streets and variations in rooflines gives a pleasing visual character to the neighborhood. The streets are paved, with parallel sidewalks and a grass berm between. During the original construction, maples were planted on the berm at each lot; substantial numbers survive. The entire neighborhood is located on a roughly L-shaped, nearly level site, and is surrounded by similar residential subdivisions, some constructed around the same time and some of more modern vintage.

The district contains a single brick bungalow, at the southwest comer of Middlebelt and Hanover, that was constructed before the neighborhood was platted. The remainder of the district consists of one-story two or three-bedroom ranch houses, either hopped roof or side gabled. A small percentage of the neighborhood, primarily the first houses built, are clad with siding, but the vast majority are brick. Brick veneers are typically of red brick, but orange-red, buff, and grayish brick were also used. Stone veneer or brick of a different hue is incorporated in many houses on the front above window-sill level and in decorative panels. Most houses have detached garages located at the back end of the lot.

Street scenes

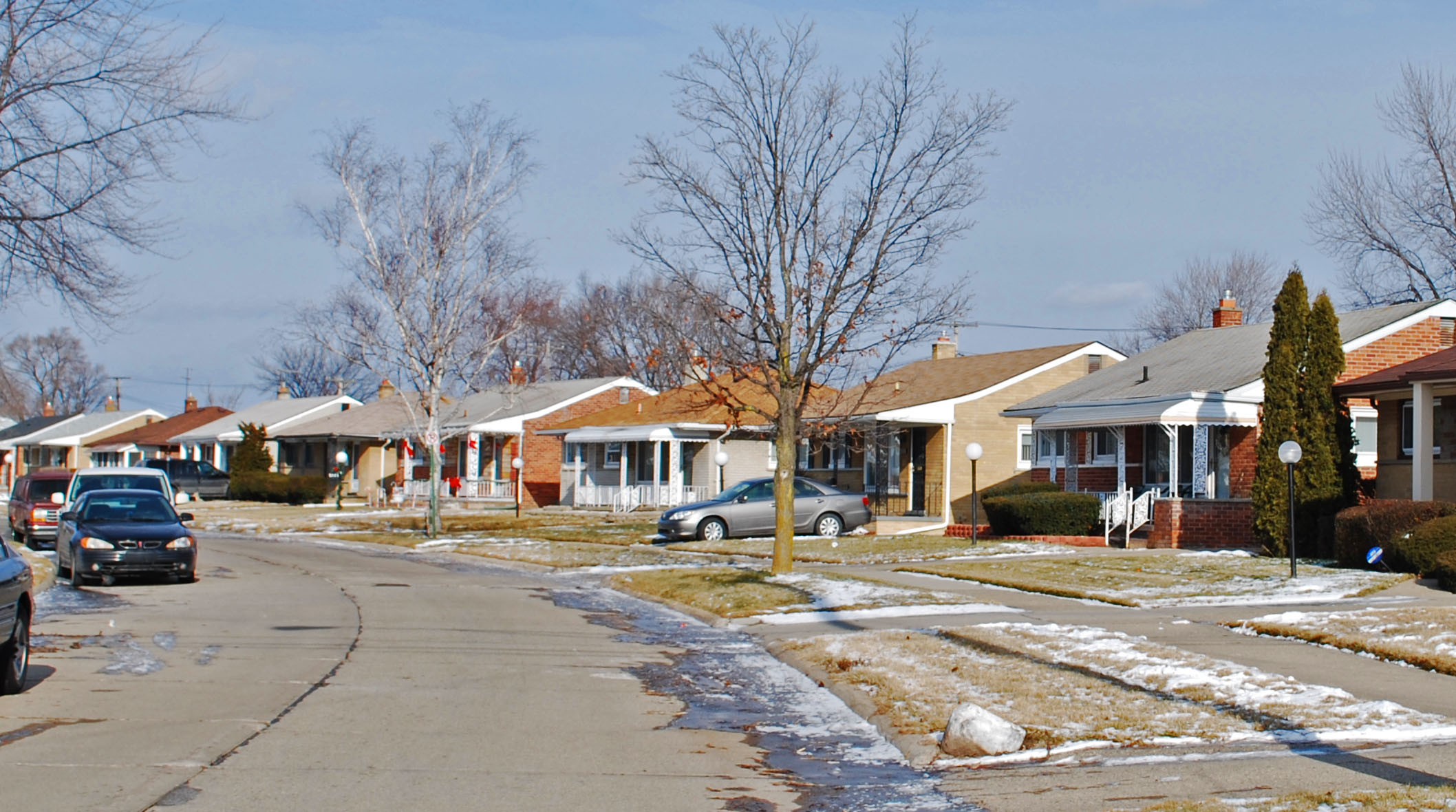
Looking north on Julius

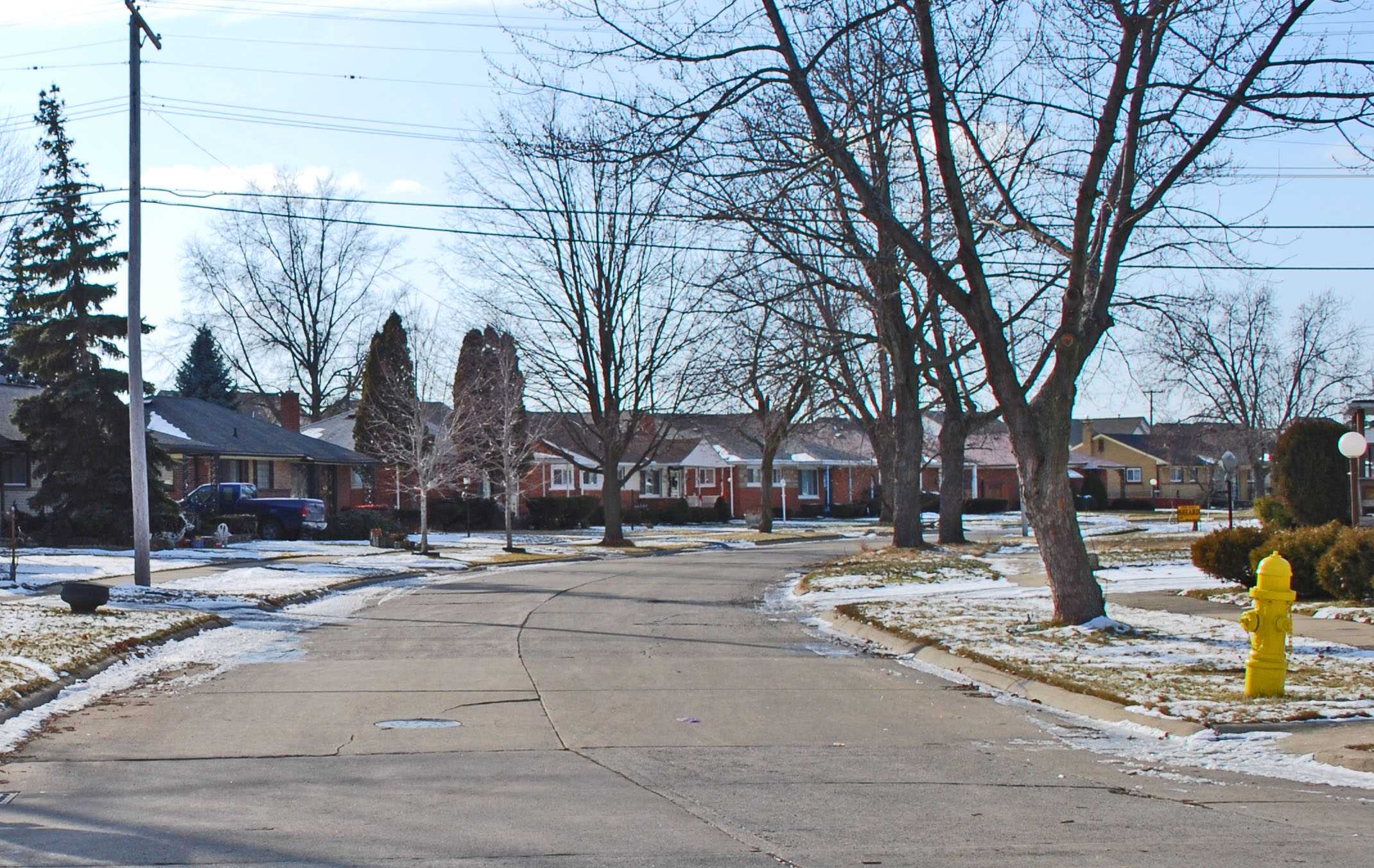
Looking south on Julius
