= Guy Rucker =

American basketball player (born 1977)

Personal information
- Born: July 27, 1977 (age 49) Inkster, Michigan, U.S.
- Listed height: 6 ft 11 in (2.11 m)
- Listed weight: 265 lb (120 kg)

Career information
- High school: John Glenn (Westland, Michigan)
- College: Iowa (1996–1999)
- NBA draft: 1999: undrafted
- Playing career: 1999–2005
- Position: Power forward
- Number: 5

Career history
- 1999–2000: New Hampshire Thunder Loons
- 2001–2002: Debreceni Vadkakasok
- 2002: Golden State Warriors
- 2003: Gary Steelheads
- 2003–2004: Jilin Northeast Tigers
- 2004: Jolly JBŠ
- 2004: Rockford Lightning
- 2005: Anyang SBS Stars
- Stats at NBA.com
- Stats at Basketball Reference

Guy Terrance Rucker (born July 27, 1977) is an American former professional basketball player. A power forward, he played college basketball for the Iowa Hawkeyes. Rucker played professional basketball from 1999 to 2005, mostly in the United States Basketball League, Continental Basketball Association, Europe, and Asia. For part of the 2002–03 season, Rucker played for the Golden State Warriors of the National Basketball Association (NBA).

== Early life and college career ==
Born in Inkster, Michigan, Rucker graduated from John Glenn High School in nearby Westland in 1995. At the University of Iowa, Rucker redshirted his true freshman year and played for the Hawkeyes from 1996 to 1999.

== Pro basketball career ==
He left the Hawkeyes at the end of his junior season to play professionally for the New Hampshire Thunder Loons of the United States Basketball League. Rucker played in Hungary for Debreceni Vadkakasok during the 2001–2002 season, where he averaged 14.7 points and 5.9 rebounds per game.

Rucker signed with the Los Angeles Lakers of the NBA on September 18, 2002, for preseason and was waived on October 28, 2002. On October 31, 2002, Rucker signed with the Golden State Warriors. He appeared in three games for the Warriors where he tallied four minutes, one rebound, one assist, one personal foul, and no points. Rucker was waived by the Warriors on November 17, 2002. He later played in seven games for the Gary Steelheads of the Continental Basketball Association, averaging 4.4 points and 3.7 rebounds.

In 2004, Rucker played briefly for the Croatian team Jolly JBŠ of the ABA League and Rockford Lightning of the Continental Basketball Association. With the Lightning, Rucker averaged 13.8 points and 9.2 rebounds in five games. Rucker ended his basketball career in 2005 with the Anyang SBS Stars of the Korean Basketball League.

== Career statistics ==
Legend
GP	Games played	GS	Games started	MPG	Minutes per game
FG%	Field goal percentage	3P%	3-point field goal percentage	FT%	Free throw percentage
RPG	Rebounds per game	APG	Assists per game	SPG	Steals per game
BPG	Blocks per game	PPG	Points per game	**Bold**	Career high

=== NBA ===
==== Regular season ====
Year	Team	GP	GS	MPG	FG%	3P%	FT%	RPG	APG	SPG	BPG	PPG
2002–03	Golden State	3	0	1.3	–	–	–	.3	.3	.0	.0	.0
