= Jeremy Langford =

American football player (born 1991)

No. 33, 43
- Position: Running back

Personal information
- Born: December 6, 1991 (age 34); Wayne, Michigan, U.S.
- Listed height: 6 ft 0 in (1.83 m)
- Listed weight: 211 lb (96 kg)

Career information
- High school: John Glenn (Westland, Michigan)
- College: Michigan State (2010–2014)
- NFL draft: 2015: 4th round, 106th overall pick

Career history
- Chicago Bears (2015–2016); Baltimore Ravens (2017); New York Jets (2017–2018)*; Miami Dolphins (2018)*; Atlanta Falcons (2018); Saskatchewan Roughriders (2020)
- * Offseason or practice squad member only

Career NFL statistics
- Rushing yards: 762
- Rushing average: 3.5
- Rushing touchdowns: 10
- Receptions: 41
- Receiving yards: 421
- Receiving touchdowns: 1
- Stats at Pro Football Reference

Jeremy Langford (born December 6, 1991) is an American former professional football player who was a running back in the National Football League (NFL). He played college football for the Michigan State Spartans, and was selected by the Chicago Bears in the fourth round of the 2015 NFL draft.

== Early life ==
Langford attended John Glenn High School in Westland, Michigan, where he played football and ran track. As a senior, he rushed for 1932 yards on 205 carries with 24 touchdowns.

He was also on the school's track & field team, where he competed as a sprinter. At the 2010 Huron Relays, he placed 7th in the 60 meters at 7.11 seconds. He was timed at 10.6 seconds in the 100 meters as a high school junior.

Regarded as a three-star recruit by Rivals.com, he was ranked the No. 37 running back nationally. He chose Michigan State over scholarship offers from Colorado and Bowling Green.

== College career ==
Langford was redshirted as a freshman in 2010. As a redshirt freshman in 2011, he was a backup running back and played special teams, recording a sack and a touchdown on a fumble return. In 2012, he was a backup to Le'Veon Bell, rushing nine times for 23 yards. As a junior in 2013, he started all 14 games, rushing for 1,422 yards on 292 carries with 18 touchdowns. As a senior, he rushed for a career-high 1,522 yards on 276 carries and recorded 22 touchdowns, tying the school record set by Javon Ringer in 2008. In the 2015 Cotton Bowl versus Baylor, he rushed for 162 yards on 27 carries and three touchdowns, helping lead the Spartans to a 42–41 victory.

=== Statistics ===
Season	Team	Rushing					Receiving			
Season	Team	Att	Yds	Avg	Lng	TD	Rec	Yds	Avg	TD
2010	Michigan State	Redshirted								
2011	Michigan State	Redshirted								
2012	Michigan State	9	23	2.6	5	0	0	0	0.0	0
2013	Michigan State	292	1,422	4.9	44	18	28	157	5.6	1
2014	Michigan State	276	1,522	5.5	38	22	11	62	6.1	0
Career		577	2,967	5.1	44	40	40	219	5.5	1

== Professional career ==
Pre-draft measurables
Height	Weight	Arm length	Hand span	40-yard dash	10-yard split	20-yard split	20-yard shuttle	Three-cone drill	Vertical jump	Broad jump	Bench press
5 ft 11 5/8 in (1.82 m)	208 lb (94 kg)	31 1/2 in (0.80 m)	8 3/4 in (0.22 m)	4.42 s	1.55 s	2.58 s	4.31 s	7.22 s	34.5 in (0.88 m)	9 ft 10 in (3.00 m)	19 reps
All values from NFL Combine/Michigan State's Pro Day

=== Chicago Bears ===
==== 2015 ====
Langford was drafted in the fourth round (106th overall) by the Chicago Bears in the 2015 NFL draft. He was the ninth running back selected out of the 23 drafted. On May 8, 2015, the Bears signed Langford to a four-year, $2.82 million contract that includes a signing bonus of $292,562.

He entered training camp competing with Jacquizz Rodgers, Senorise Perry, and Ka'Deem Carey for the backup running back position. Langford was named the Bears' third running back on their depth chart behind veterans Matt Forte and Jacquizz Rodgers to begin the regular season. During the Bears season opener against the Green Bay Packers, he received his first career carry for one-yard. The next game, he had six carries for 21 yards while scoring his first career rushing touchdown on a one-yard run against the Arizona Cardinals. Throughout the first seven games of the season, Langford had a light workload, backing up long-time Bears running back Forte. In Week 8, against the Minnesota Vikings, he had a season high 12 carries for 46 rushing yards after Forte left the game with a knee injury. Langford received his first career start on November 9, 2015, filling in for injured veteran Forte against the San Diego Chargers, gaining 73 rushing yards on 20 carries and a rushing touchdown, as well as 70 receiving yards on three catches which included a 23-yard gain, and a 31-yard catch, helping the Bears come back in the fourth quarter and win the Week 9 match-up, 23–20. Langford recorded a career-high 83 yards rushing on 18 carries against the Tampa Bay Buccaneers on December 27, 2015.

==== 2016 ====
Langford opened up the 2016 season as the Bears starting running back. He started the first three games before suffering an ankle sprain in Week 3, causing him to miss several weeks. During that time, rookie Jordan Howard had emerged as the starting running back in his absence. Langford returned to action in Week 8, however Howard kept the starting job the rest of the season, demoting Langford to the second-string. He finished the season with 200 rushing yards and four touchdowns, along with 19 receptions for 142 yards.

On September 3, 2017, Langford was released by the Bears after falling down the depth chart behind Howard, rookie Tarik Cohen, and Benny Cunningham.

=== Baltimore Ravens ===
On September 5, 2017, Langford was signed to the practice squad of the Baltimore Ravens. On September 14, 2017, Langford was promoted to the active roster after an injury to Danny Woodhead. However two days later, Langford was waived by the Ravens and re-signed back to the practice squad. He was released by the team on September 27, 2017.

=== New York Jets ===
On December 8, 2017, the New York Jets signed Langford to their practice squad. He signed a reserve/future contract with the Jets on January 10, 2018. He was waived on April 13, 2018.

=== Miami Dolphins ===
On August 6, 2018, Langford signed with the Miami Dolphins. He was waived on September 1, 2018, and was signed to the practice squad the next day. He was released on September 5, 2018.

=== Atlanta Falcons ===
On November 28, 2018, Langford was signed to the Atlanta Falcons practice squad. He was promoted to the active roster on December 18, 2018. He appeared in one game, against the Buccaneers in Week 17, and had nine carries for 25 rushing yards. On May 11, 2019, the Falcons waived/injured Langford, and was subsequently placed on injured reserve on May 14 after clearing waivers. He was released on June 26, 2019.

=== Saskatchewan Roughriders ===
On April 23, 2020, Langford signed with the Saskatchewan Roughriders of the Canadian Football League. He was placed on the suspended list on July 3, 2021. He was released on August 11, 2021.

== Personal life ==
Langford was raised by his mother, Shamine Langford, and his father, Jeffrey Langford. He is the cousin of NFL running back Peyton Barber.
