= John Glenn High School (Westland, Michigan) =

High school in Westland, Michigan, United States

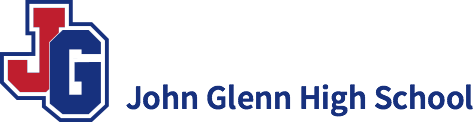

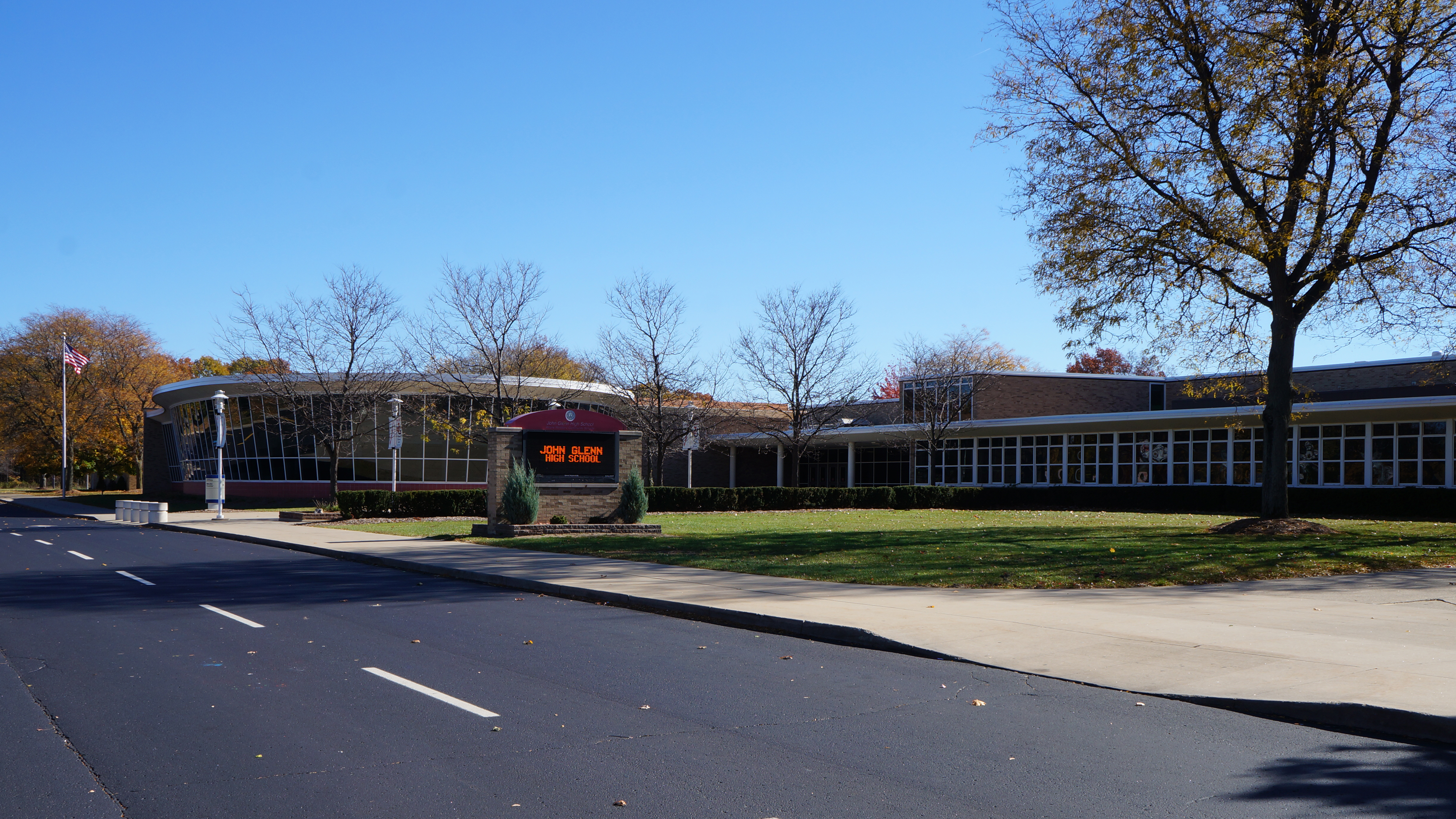

Location
- 36105 Marquette Street; Westland, Michigan 48185; United States; 42°18′57″N 83°23′45″W

Information
- Type: Public secondary
- Opened: 1964; 62 years ago
- School district: Wayne-Westland Community Schools
- Teaching staff: 66.80 (on a FTE basis)
- Grades: 9–12
- Enrollment: 1,468 (2023–2024)
- Student to teacher ratio: 21.98
- Colors: Red, white and blue
- Athletics conference: Kensington Lakes Activities Association
- Nickname: Rockets
- Newspaper: Explorer
- Yearbook: Satellite
- Website: www.wwcsd.net/schools/high-schools/john-glenn-high-school/

Student assessments
- 2021–22 school year Change vs. prior year

M-STEP 11th grade proficiency rates (Science / Social Studies)
- Advanced %: 7.2 / 6.1
- Proficient %: 18.1 / 27.2
- PR. Proficient %: 11.6 / 52.0
- Not Proficient %: 63.1 / 14.6

Average test scores
- SAT Total: 884.3 (▼ −33.9)

John Glenn High School is a public high school in Westland, Michigan. It serves portions of Westland, Canton Township, Inkster, and Dearborn Heights. It is a part of the Wayne-Westland Community Schools district.

== History ==
One of two traditional high schools serving the Wayne-Westland Community Schools, John Glenn High School is located in the city of Westland, Michigan. The school, which opened in 1964, was named for astronaut John Glenn, who just two years prior in 1962 had become the first American to orbit the Earth. The "space" theme dominates at JGHS, including the nickname ("Rockets"), yearbook (the Satellite), newspaper (the Explorer, formerly the Echo), and school store (the Gantry).

When John Glenn High School opened its doors in 1964, it did not have its own football field, having to play home games on the field of rival Wayne Memorial High School for the better part of its first decade. The building was only a fraction of its current size. To keep up with expanding enrollment in the 1970s and 1980s, new wings were added for Fine Arts and Special Education, as well as a new gymnasium and its own football and baseball fields. Fitting for a school named for an astronaut, JGHS is one of the few high schools in the state to feature a planetarium.

When John Glenn High School opened under principal Frank Higgins, it served students in grades 7–11, expanding to grades 8–12 from 1965 to 1967. After a brief stint as a four-year high school (9–12), it stabilized as a 10–12th grade school in 1970, finally returning to its 9–12 status in 1995 when the Wayne-Westland district adopted a middle school format.

== Demographics ==
The demographic breakdown of the 1,634 students enrolled in 2021–2022 was:

- Native American/Alaskan – 0.5%
- Asian/Pacific islanders – 2.1%
- African American – 37.6%
- Hispanic/Latino – 7%
- White – 49.2%
- Multiracial – 3.4%

49% of students were economically disadvantaged during the 2021–2022 school year

== Athletics ==
The John Glenn Rockets are members of the Kensington Lakes Activities Association. The school colors are red, white and blue. The following MHSAA sanctioned sports are offered:

- Baseball (boys)
- Basketball (boys and girls)
- Bowling (boys and girls)
- Competitive cheer (girls)
- Cross country (boys and girls)
- Football (boys)
- Golf (boys and girls)
- Soccer (boys and girls)
- Softball (girls)
- Swim and dive (boys and girls)
- Tennis (boys and girls)
- Track and field (boys and girls)
- Volleyball (girls)
- Wrestling (boys)

Prior to his tenure at the Michigan Wolverines football team, head coach Lloyd Carr coached the Rockets.

== Notable alumni ==
- Keshawn Martin, New England Patriots wide receiver
- Tony Boles, University of Michigan running back
- Josh Gracin, country music singer
- Jeremy Langford, Chicago Bears running back
- Jewell Jones, state representative
- Danielle Hartsell and Steve Hartsell, pairs figure skating US national champions 1999
- Guy Rucker, NBA player for the Golden State Warriors
- Mike Kelley, artist
- Jeffrey M. Monforton, Auxiliary Bishop of Detroit
