= Norwayne Historic District =

Historic district in Michigan, United States

- U.S. National Register of Historic Places
- U.S. Historic district
- Michigan State Historic Site
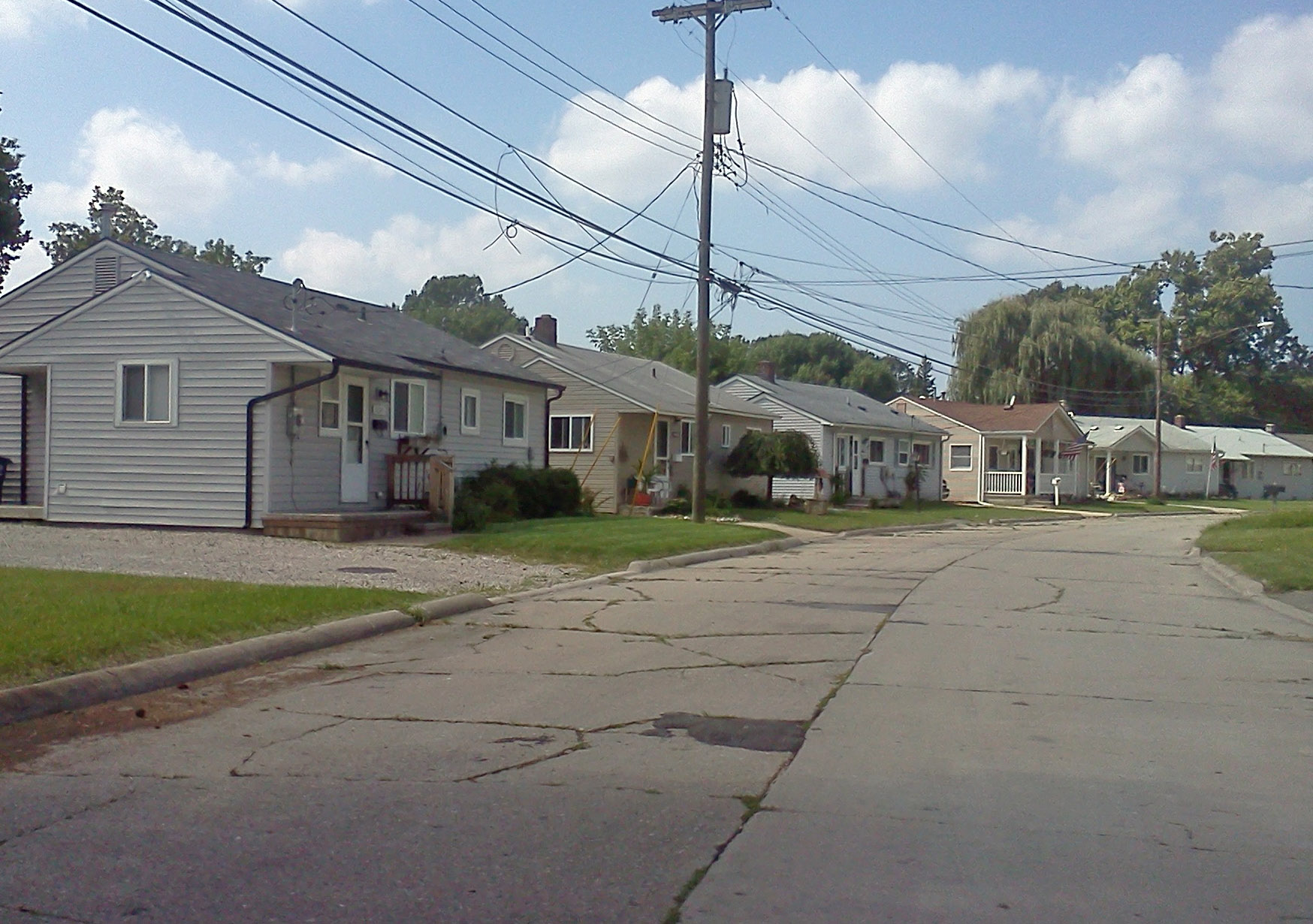
- Streetscape with single family houses

- Location within Michigan Location within the United States
- Interactive map
- Location: Generally bounded by Palmer, Wildwood, Glenwood & Merriman Rds., Wayne County Lower Rouge Pkwy., Westland, Michigan
- Coordinates: 42°17′32″N 83°21′55″W
- Area: 1,080 acres (440 ha)
- Architectural style: Mid-Century modern, Bungalow, Streamline Moderne
- NRHP reference No.: 13000479
- Added to NRHP: July 9, 2013

The Norwayne Historic District, or Norwayne Subdivision, is an historic residential subdivision, originally built for World War II defense workers. It is located in Westland, Michigan and roughly bounded by Palmer Road on the north, Wildwood Road on the west, Merriman Road on the east, and Glenwood Road and the Wayne County Lower Rouge Parkway on the south. It was listed on the National Register of Historic Places in 2013.

== Construction ==
The Norwayne Subdivision was begun in 1942 by the National Housing Agency in order to house workers employed at nearby defense industry plants, including the Willow Run Bomber Plant. The Detroit architectural firm of Lyndon and Smith was originally chosen to design the subdivision. However, Maynard Lyndon, one of the firm's principals, moved to California in 1942, and subsequent design work was done by Augustus O’Dell, Hewlett & Luckenbach. Substantial construction was completed in 1943, but additional work was carried out through 1947, when the community church was constructed. Due to wartime scarcity of materials, construction was done with materials at hand, and items like gutters were left off.

The original occupancy of the Norwayne subdivision was restricted to war workers and military personnel whose income was under a specific level. In 1944, the income cap was $2000 yearly for a family of two persons, with an additional $200 for each child up to $2800 maximum.

The project originally had 1189 residential buildings, which contained a total of 1900 individual dwelling units. The 1189 units were 192 one-bedroom row houses, 200 two-bedroom row houses, 362 two-bedroom twin houses, 674 two-bedroom single homes, and 472 three-bedroom twin homes. The subdivision also included a management office (now the Dorsey Community Center), a fire station (now demolished and replaced), a church, two elementary schools (Lincoln Elementary School and Jefferson-Barns Elementary School), and several commercial properties.

== Later history ==
After the end of World War II, the federal government decided to sell houses to individual residents, with preference given to veterans. In 1948, the local township took over operation of water and sewer services for the subdivision, and in 1953, sales of individual homes began. However, by as early as 1962, some units had deteriorated to the point that demolition was required. Over the years, home ownership declined and some units deteriorated further, earning the neighborhood the pejorative name, "Shacktown." Both elementary schools in the neighborhood were closed in 2010. The Lincoln Elementary School building was torn down. Jefferson-Barns school building now houses the Jefferson-Barns Community Vitality Center. Despite efforts to revitalize the area, low-income residents, apathy, and disrepair have remained.

== Description ==
The Norwayne Historic District is bisected by Venoy Road, which runs north–south; Grand Traverse Street, which meanders roughly east–west, serves as a main trunkline for the neighborhood. Cross-streets and half-circle courts extend from Grand Traverse; the residential structures all face onto these cross-streets and courts, set back a consistent distance from the street. Streets in the subdivision are primarily curvilinear, following the Federal Housing Administration guidelines published in the late 1930s. Commercial and public buildings are located on or near Venoy Road, with the exception of the former elementary schools, which were located at the east and west ends of the neighborhood.

Of the original 1189 residential units, 1124 are still extant. The district includes these residential structures, as well as the former Lincoln and Jefferson-Barns Elementary Schools (both closed in 2010), the Community Church, Dorsey Center, and the commercial buildings located along Venoy. In all, there are 1069 contributing and 123 non-contributing structures in the neighborhood.

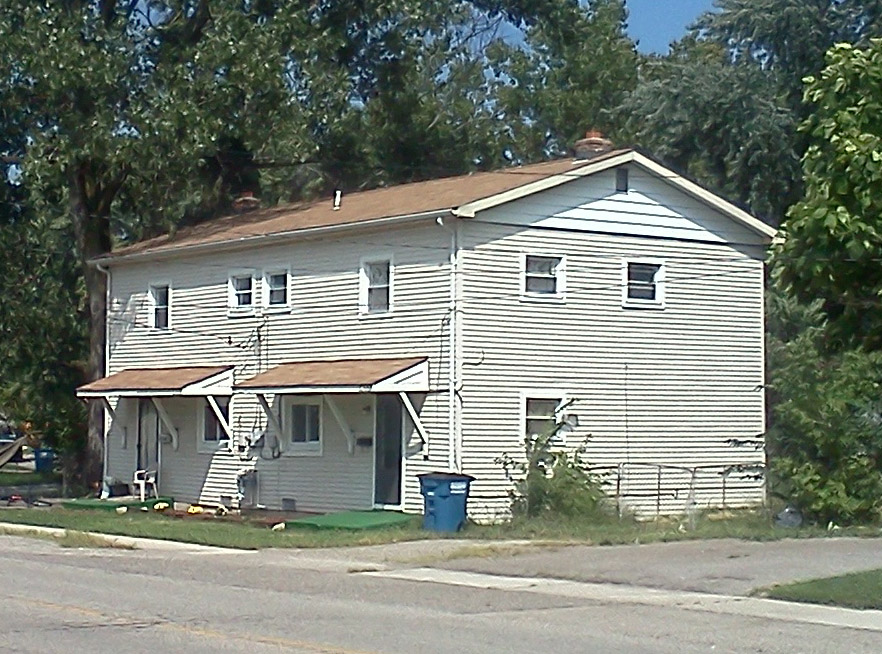
Duplex

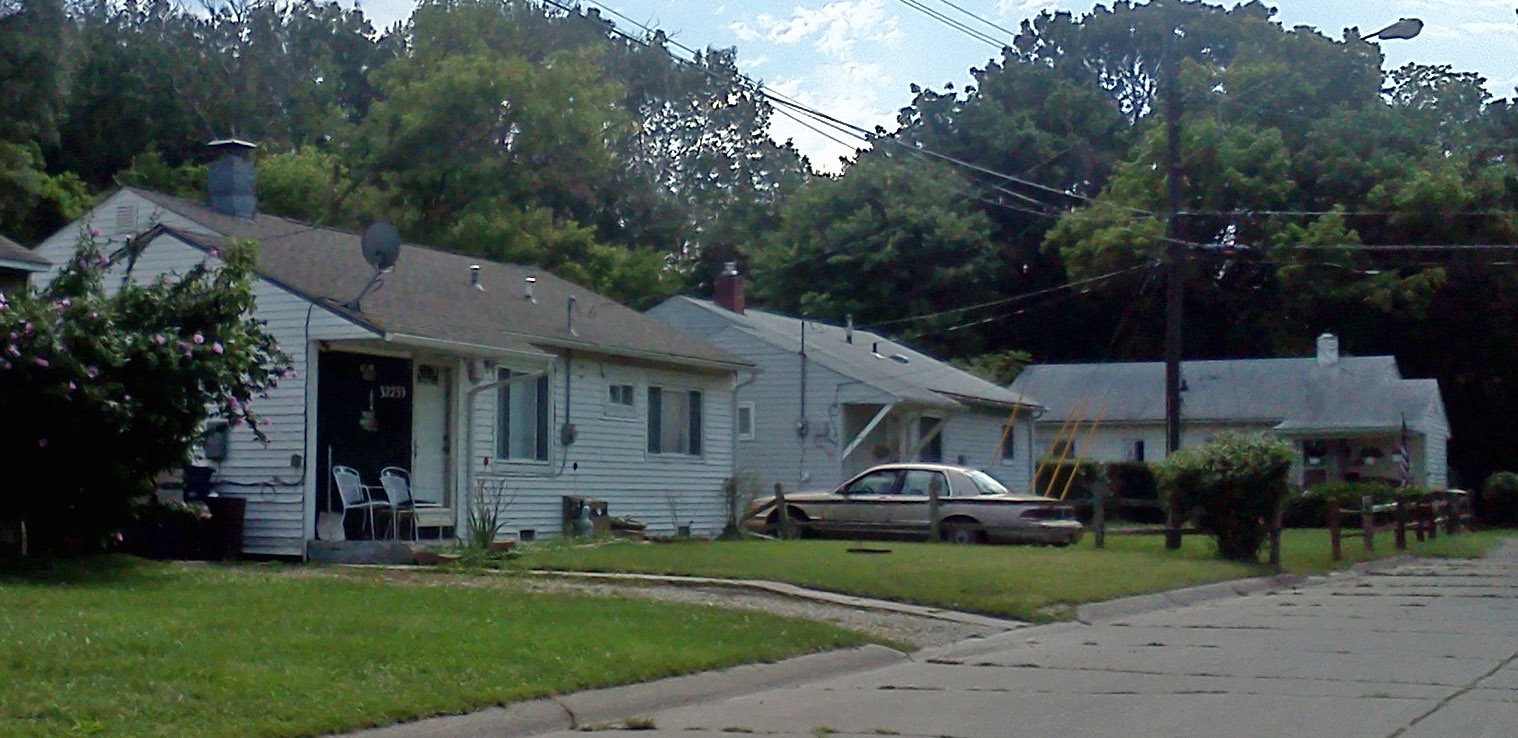
Streetscape with houses

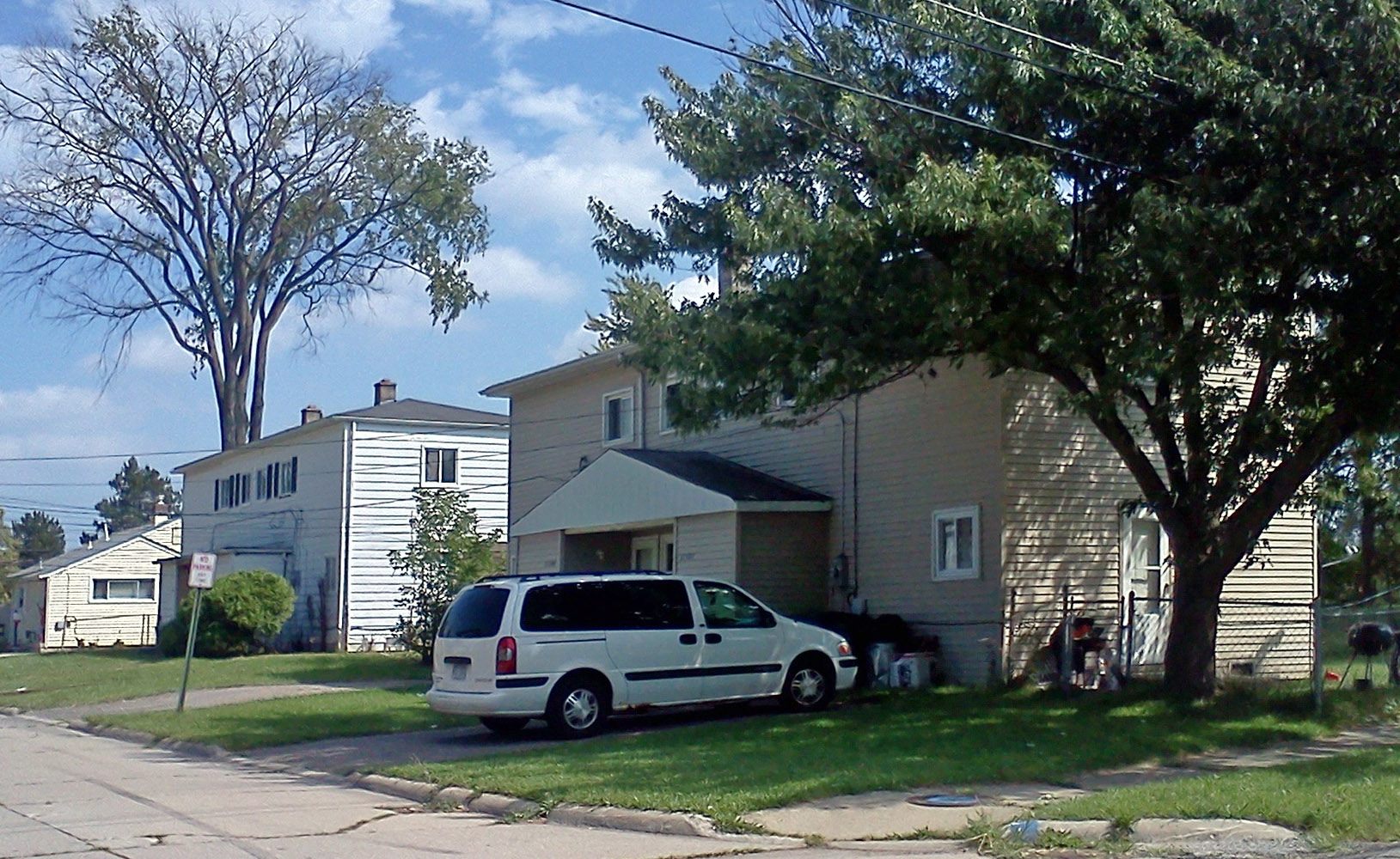
Streetscape with houses

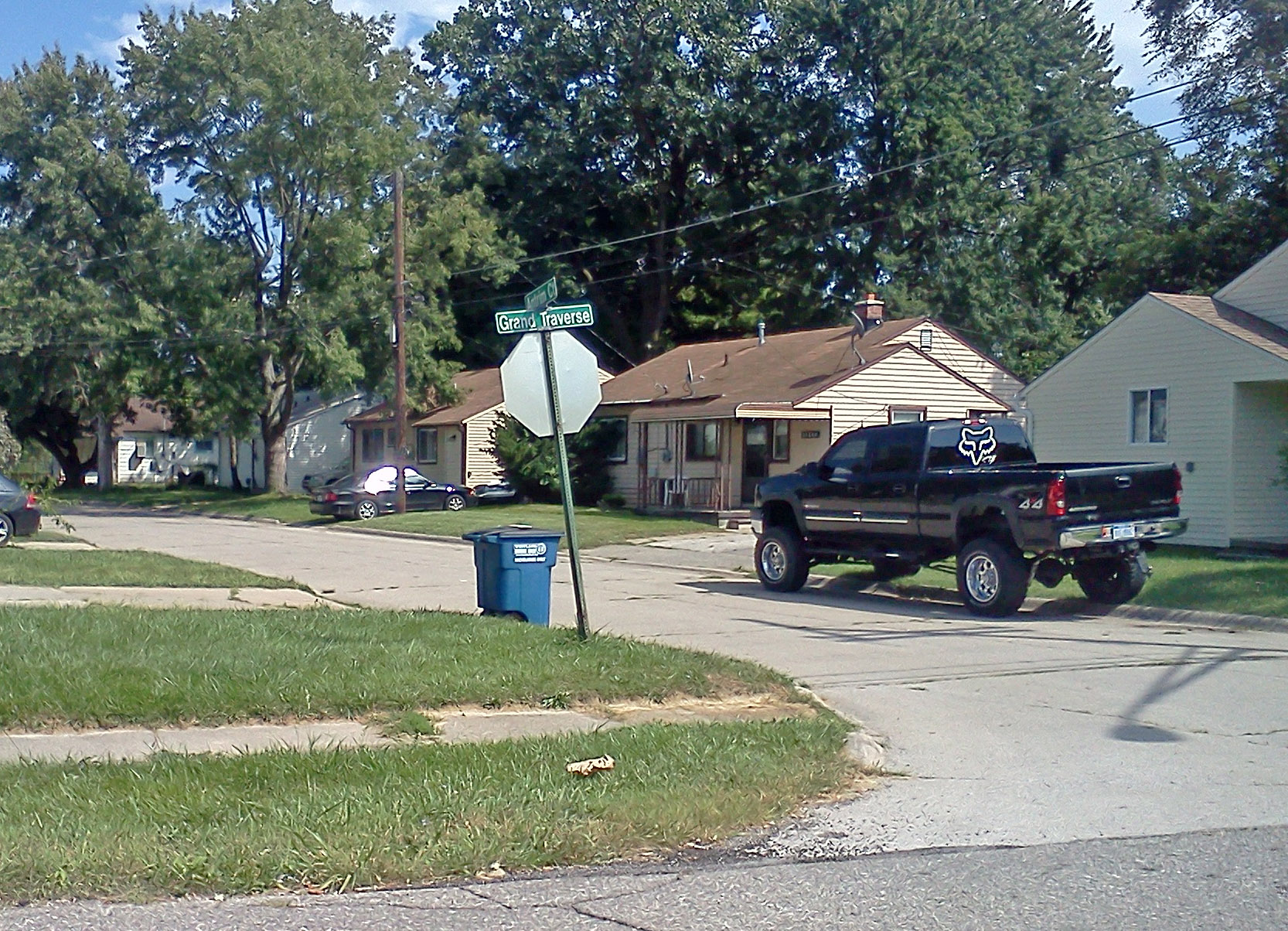
Streetscape with houses

=== Rowhouses ("quads") ===
Each of the 69 one story rowhouses contains four units. Each of the units are entered through a door in the front façade. Each unit has a kitchen, living room and 1 bedroom and bathroom. These units were originally flat-roofed and sided with weatherboard; in the 1990s, a federally funded project added gabled roofs and vinyl siding to all the rowhouses.

=== Three-bedroom duplexes ===
The 191 contributing three-bedroom duplexes measure 44 feet (13 m) long by 24.5 feet (7.5 m) wide and are two stories tall. The duplexes contain two mirror-image units, with entrance doors in the front facade at opposite ends. Each unit contains 1,078 square feet (100.1 m^{2}), with a living room and kitchen on the first floor, and three bedrooms and a bath on the second floor. Roofs were originally flat, but many have been gabled, and most units have vinyl or aluminum siding applied over the original clapboard.

=== Two-bedroom duplexes ===
The 193 two-bedroom duplexes measure 37 feet (11 m) long by 24.6 feet (7.5 m) wide and are two stories tall. The duplexes contain two mirror-image units, with entrance doors in the center of the unit. Each unit contains 864 square feet, with a living room and kitchen on the first floor, and two bedrooms and a bath on the second floor. Roofs were originally flat, but many have been gabled, and most units have vinyl or aluminum siding applied over the original clapboard.

=== Two-bedroom single family homes ===
The 618 single-family houses measure 36.2 feet (11.0 m) long by 24.8 feet (7.6 m) wide. They were originally built as a single story, but some have a second story addition. There are two entrances; one in the front and one in the rear. Each unit contains 834 square feet (77.5 m^{2}), with a living room, kitchen, dining room, two bedrooms and a bath. The houses have gable roofs, and most units have vinyl or aluminum siding applied over the original clapboard.

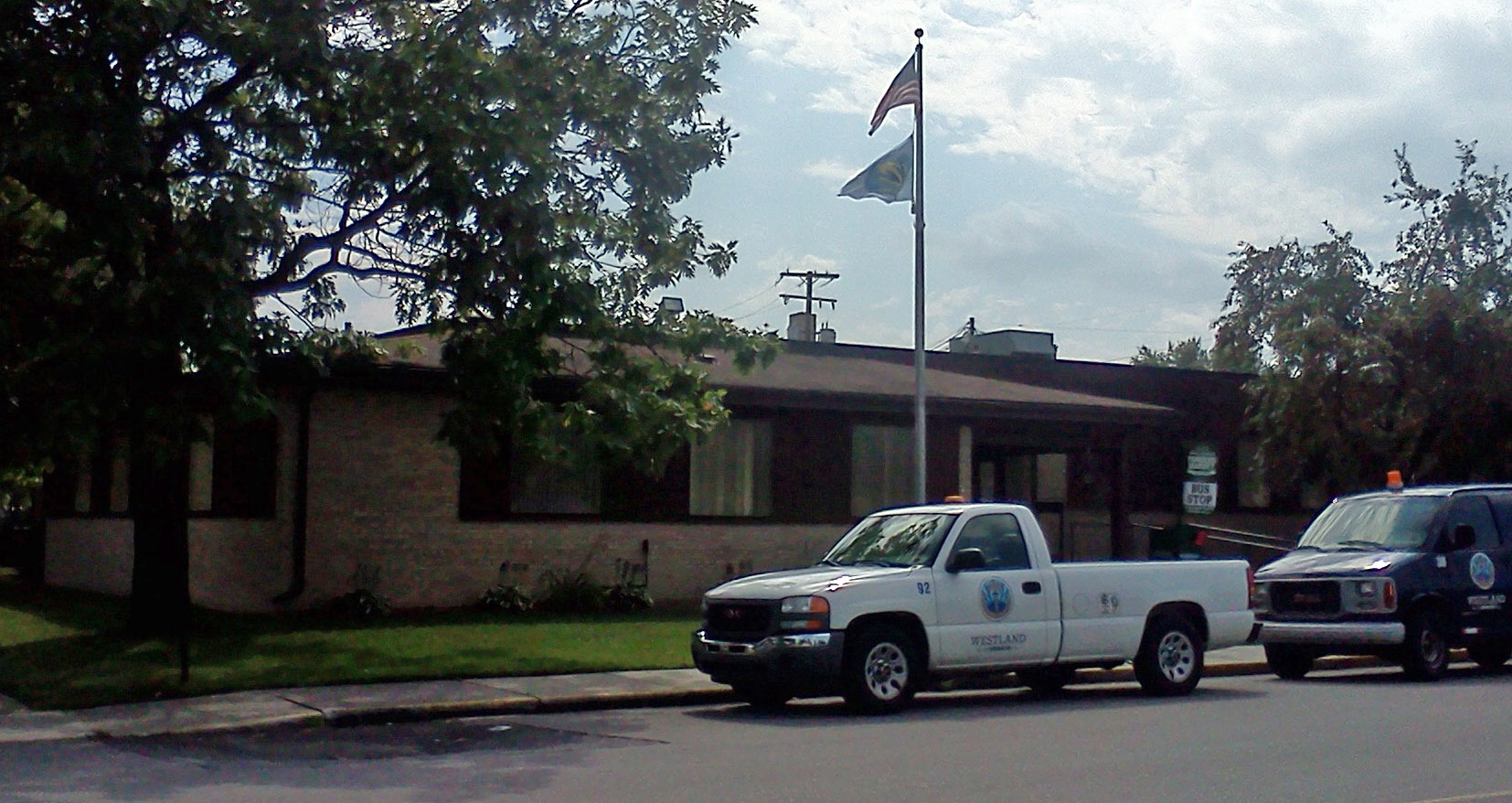
Community Center

=== Dorsey Community Center ===
The Dorsey Community Center (originally the management office for the subdivision) is located at the southwest corner of Dorsey Road and Grand Traverse Road. It is a one-story structure built of beige brick with a flat roof. Large single-light casement windows are located on each side of the building. The interior includes office space, a conference room, and a large multi-purpose room.

=== Fire station ===
The subdivision originally had a fire station located just behind the Dorsey Community Center. The station had a single bay, a kitchen, dayroom, sleeping quarters, and bathroom. The station was demolished and replaced with another station at a different location in the 1980s.

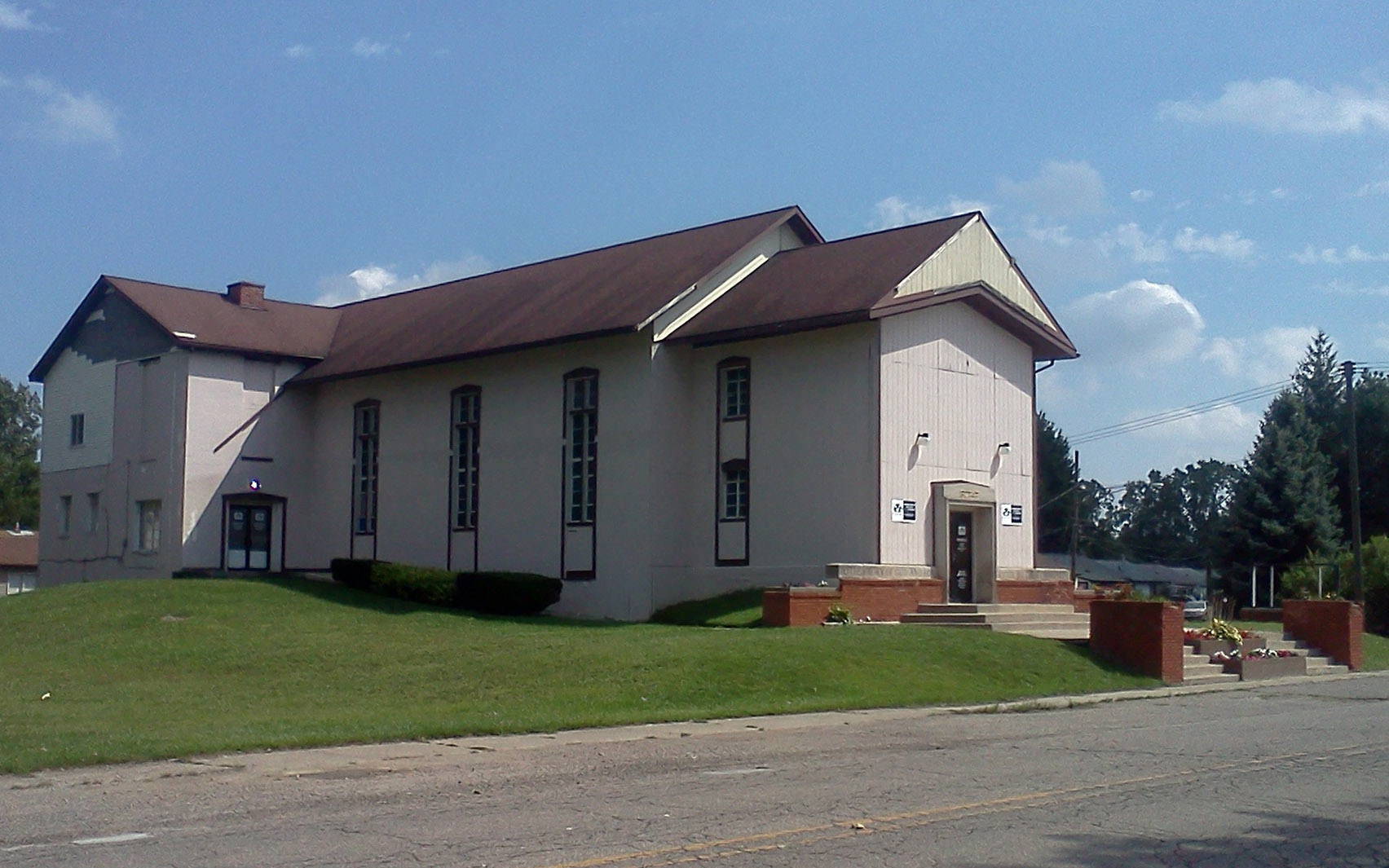
Norwayne Community Church

=== Norwayne Community Church ===
The Norwayne Community Church is located at the southeast corner of Grand Traverse Street and Dorsey Road, atop a small but prominent rise. It is a two-story T-shaped structure built from block, with a gabled roof and a small square belfry. The entrance is in the middle of the front facade under the gable, with eight steps leading to a brick porch. Tall windows line the side elevations. The church has been painted beige.

=== Schools ===
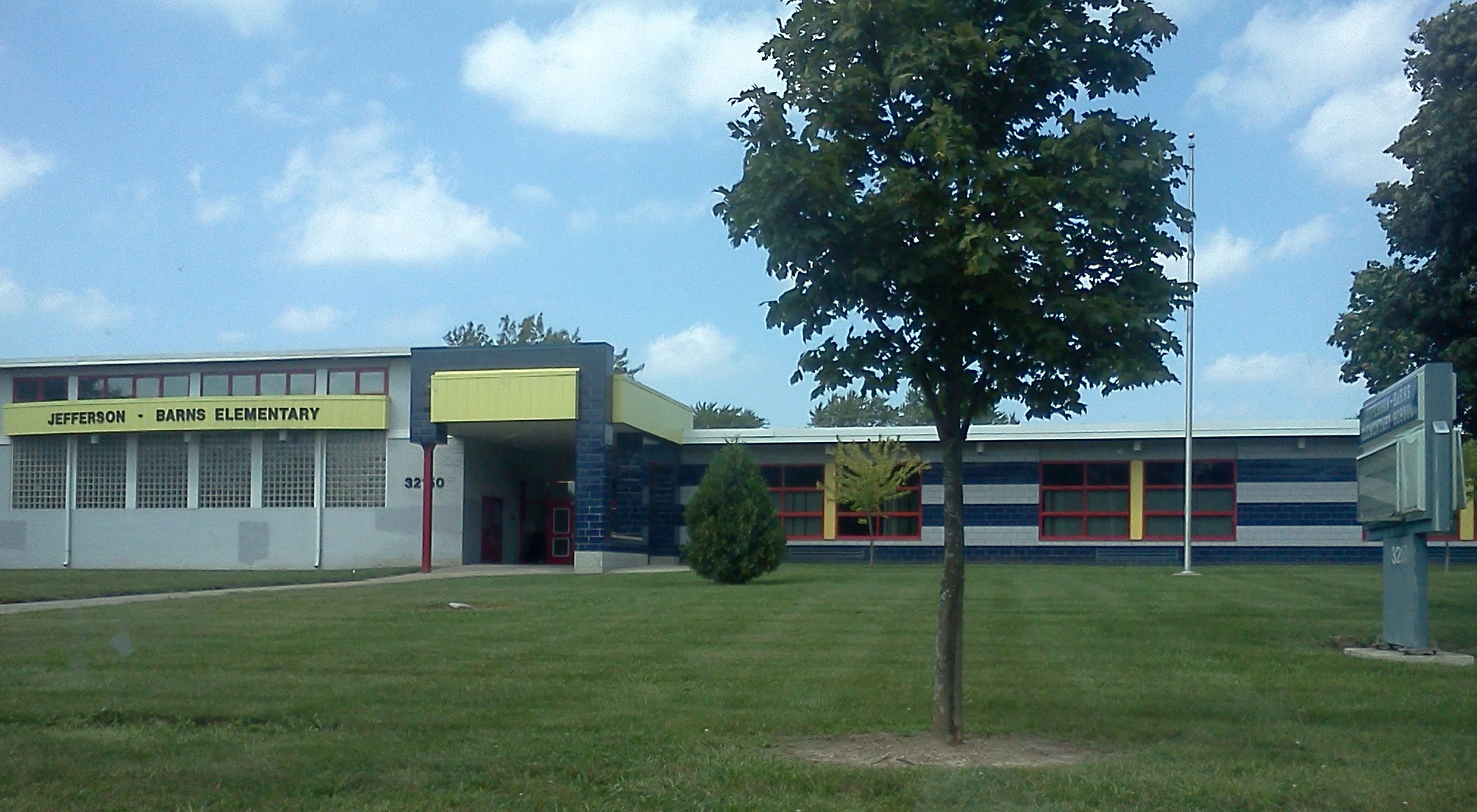
Jefferson-Barns Elementary School

The Lincoln and Jefferson-Barns Elementary Schools were constructed roughly in the center of each half of the subdivision. Both school buildings are single-story brick structures, with wide flat roofs and a T-shape construction to accommodate both daycare and classrooms. Both have a taller multi-purpose room. Lincoln elementary was constructed with a longer classroom wing, although both schools have had additions constructed at some point. Both elementary schools are closed. The Lincoln Elementary School building was torn down in 2016. The Jefferson-Barns building is now the home of the Jefferson-Barns Community Vitality Center.

=== Parks in the Norwayne District ===
There are five parks in the Norwayne subdivision. Before 1958, they were simply vacant lots, but the township acquired the lots and cleaned them up. The parks include picnic pavilions and playground equipment.

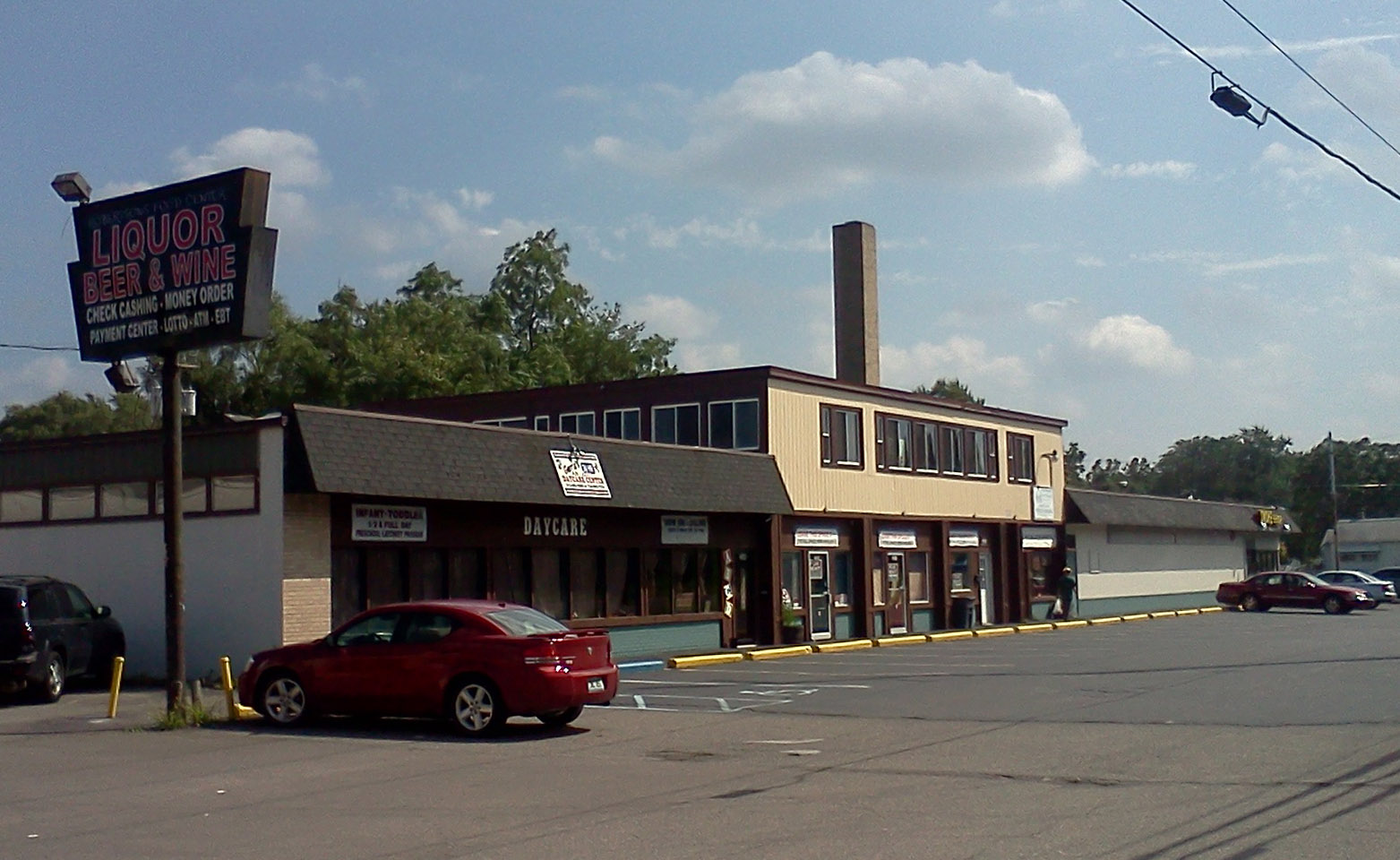
Commercial building

=== Commercial structures ===
A few commercial structures, located on the east side of Venoy Road just south of Dorsey Road, were part of the original Norwayne development. The two-story building at 2345 Venoy Road originally housed a grocery store, dry cleaner, barber shop, beauty parlor, and taxicab office on the first floor and a physician's and dentist's offices on the second. An addition to the building housed a drug store. A second commercial building housed a five-and-dime store

== Notable people ==
- Kris Charon, author
