= Wayne-Westland Community Schools =

School district in Michigan

Address
- 36745 Marquette Westland, Wayne, Michigan, 48185; United States

District information
- Type: Public
- Grades: Pre-kindergarten through 12
- Superintendent: Jennifer Curry
- Schools: 16
- Budget: US$260,593,000 (2022-2023)
- NCES District ID: 2600015

Students and staff
- Students: 9,861 (2024-2025)
- Teachers: 576.49 (2024-2025)
- Staff: 1,536.85 (2024-2025)
- Student–teacher ratio: 17.11 (2024-2025)

Other information
- Website: www.wwcsd.net

Wayne-Westland Community Schools is a school district headquartered in Westland, Michigan in Metro Detroit. The district service area includes Wayne and portions of Inkster, Westland, Canton, and Romulus.

== History ==
Wayne Memorial High School was built in 1953. Its predecessor, Wayne High School, became the board of education offices. 'Memorial' was added to the name to honor those killed serving in World War II. The auditorium was added in 1957. In 1962, a fallout shelter equipped with survival supplies was installed under the auditorium. The school was expanded and renovated in 1974 and again as part of the 2018 bond issue.

John Glenn High School opened in 1964. It was named for astronaut John Glenn and included a state-of-the-art planetarium. The architect was Jahr-Anderson Associates.

During the summer of 2013, the Inkster Public Schools District was dissolved. The Wayne-Westland school district absorbed a portion of the Inkster District. Students north of Michigan Avenue and west of Middlebelt were rezoned to Wayne-Westland. As of July 2013, there were 65 registered students, including 34 elementary students, 13 middle school students, and 18 high school students, in Inkster Public Schools who lived within that part of the former Inkster district assigned to Wayne-Westland.

== Schools ==
Schools in Wayne Westland Community Schools
School	Address	Notes
John Glenn High School	36105 Marquette, Westland	Grades 9-12
Wayne Memorial High School	3001 Fourth Street, Wayne	Grades 9-12
William D. Ford Career/Technical Center	36455 Marquette, Westland	Career/technical education
Wayne-Westland Innovative Academy	5400 Fourth Street, Wayne	Alternative high school (formerly Tinkham Alternative Education)
Franklin Middle School	33555 Annapolis Street, Wayne	Grades 6-8
Stevenson Middle School	36745 Marquette, Westland	Grades 6-8
Adams Middle School	33475 Palmer, Westland	Grades 6-8
Edison Elementary	34505 Hunter, Westland	Elementary school (K–5)
Elliott Elementary	30800 Bennington, Westland	Grades K-5
Graham Elementary	1255 S. John Hix, Westland	Grades K-5
Hamilton Elementary	1031 Schuman, Westland	Grades K-5
Hicks Elementary	100 Helen, Inkster	Grades K-5
Roosevelt-McGrath Elementary	36075 Currier, Wayne	Grades K-5
Schweitzer Elementary	2601 Treadwell, Westland	Grades K-5
Taft-Galloway Elementary	4035 Gloria, Wayne	Grades K-5
Walker-Winter Elementary	39932 Michigan, Canton	Grades K-5
Wildwood Elementary	500 N. Wildwood, Westland	Grades K-5
Stottlemyer Early Childhood Center	36745 Marquette, Westland	Preschool / Early Childhood

== Former schools ==
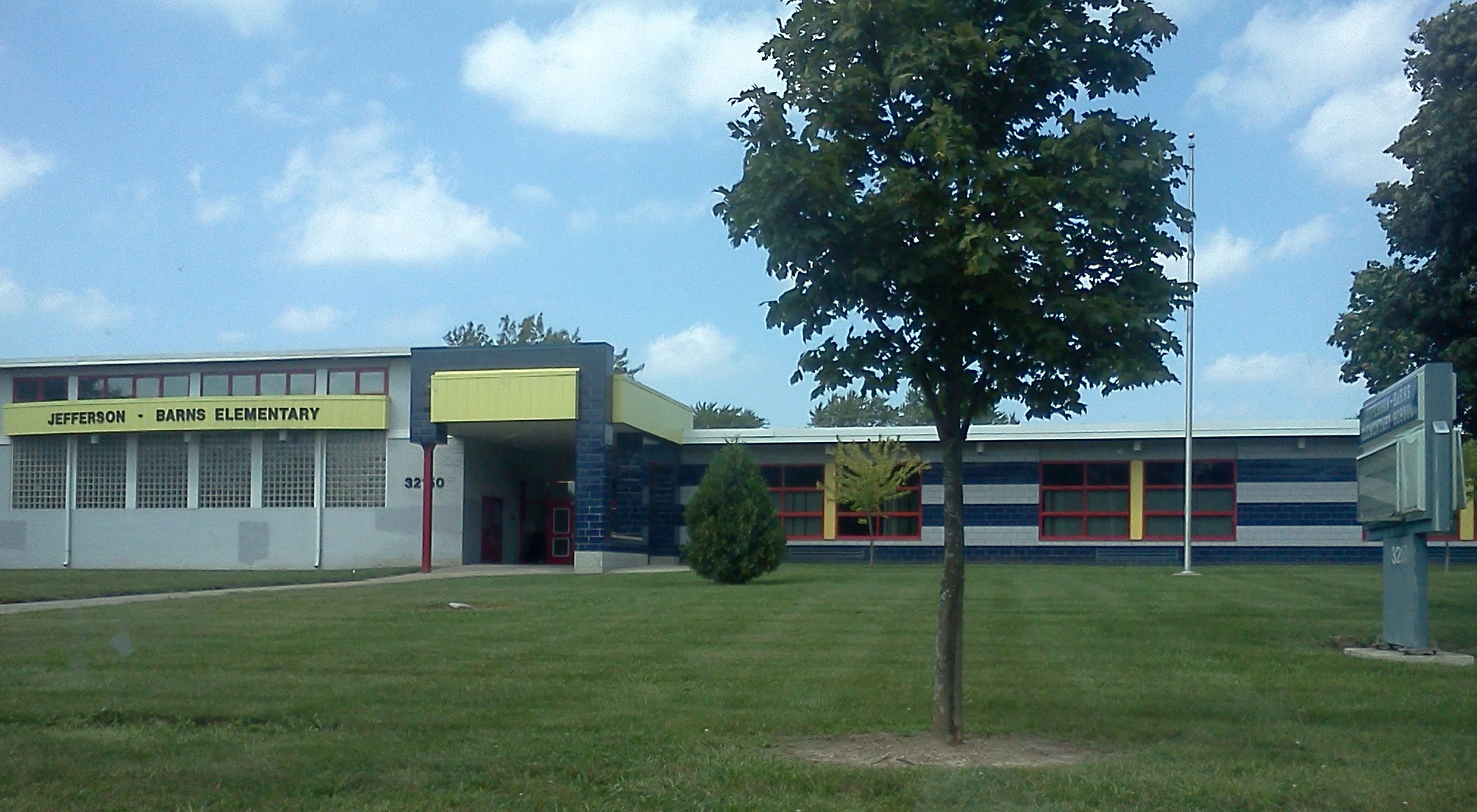
Former Jefferson-Barns Elementary School in Westland

Elementary schools:

- Cady, 121 North Wayne Road, (Westland)
- Cleveland, 34300 Palmer Road (Westland)
- Hoover, 5400 4th Street (Wayne)
- Horace Mann, 4150 Hubbard (Wayne)
- Jackson, 4426 South Venoy
- Jefferson/Barns, 32150 Dorsey (Westland)
- Kettering (Westland)
- Lincoln, 33800 Grand Traverse (Westland)
- Madison, 1075 Carlson (Westland)
- McKee, Cowan (Westland)
- Monroe, 5021 Biddle (Wayne)
- Norris, 31627 Palmer Road (Westland)
- Patchin, 6420 North Newburg Road (Westland)
- Sheldon, 45081 Geddes (Canton Twp)
- Tinkham (Westland)
- Titus (Westland)
- Tonquish Warren Rd (Westland)
- Vandenberg, 32101 Stellwagen (Wayne)
- Woodrow Wilson, 1225 Wildwood (Westland)
- Washington, 35026 Glenwood (Westland)

Junior High Schools:

- Westside 3712 Williams (Wayne)
- Southside 33415 Myrtle (Wayne)
- Northside 3101 Fourth Street (Wayne)
- Nankin Mills Cowan (Westland)
- Marshall 35100 Bayview (Westland)
