= Wayne Memorial High School =

High school in Wayne, Michigan

Location
- 3001 Fourth Street; Wayne, Michigan 48184; United States
- Coordinates: 42°17′15″N 83°22′38″W

Information
- Established: c. 1870
- School district: Wayne-Westland Community Schools
- Staff: 68.80 (FTE)
- Grades: 9-12
- Enrollment: 1,379 (2023–2024)
- Student to teacher ratio: 20.04
- Color
- Athletics conference: Kensington Lakes Activities Association
- Nickname: Zebras
- Website: School website

Student assessments
- 2021–22 school year Change vs. prior year

M-STEP 11th grade proficiency rates (Science / Social Studies)
- Advanced %: 9.5 / ≤5
- Proficient %: 16.2 / –
- PR. Proficient %: 17.8 / 53.1
- Not Proficient %: 56.4 / 19.5

Average test scores
- SAT Total: 877.3 (▲ +0.4)

Wayne Memorial High School is a high school in Wayne, Michigan in Metro Detroit, on the corner of Glenwood Road and Fourth Street, sitting near the border of Wayne and its district partner Westland. It is a part of Wayne-Westland Community Schools. It serves portions of Wayne, Westland, Inkster, and Romulus.

== Notable alumni ==
- Ginger Gilmour (1966), artist
- Pat Sheridan (1975), former MLB outfielder
- Gregory Jbara (1979), actor best known for his role as Garrett Moore in the show Blue Bloods
- Anavia Battle (2017), track and field athlete, Olympian
- Jeffrey M. Monforton 1981 auxiliary bishop of Detroit
