= Westland, Michigan =

- City
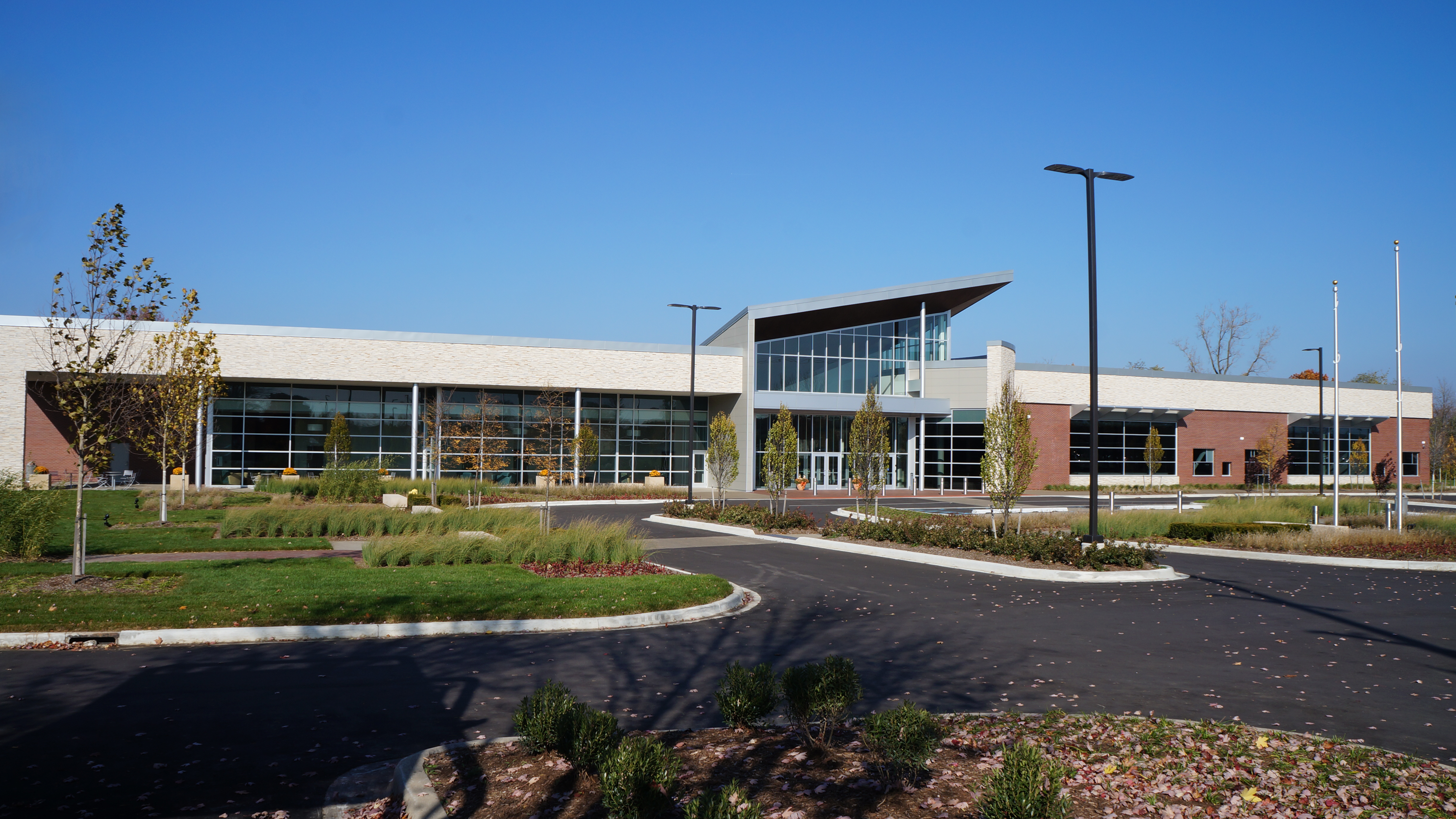
- Westland City Hall

- Flag Seal
- Nickname: An All American City
- Interactive map of Westland, Michigan
- Location within the state of Michigan Location within the United States
- Coordinates: 42°19′27″N 83°24′01″W
- Country: United States
- State: Michigan
- County: Wayne
- Incorporated: 1966

Government
  - Type: Mayor-Council
  - Mayor: Kevin Coleman
  - Clerk: Richard LeBlanc

Area
  - City: 20.45 sq mi (52.96 km^{2})
  - Land: 20.43 sq mi (52.92 km^{2})
  - Water: 0.015 sq mi (0.04 km^{2})
- Elevation: 653 ft (199 m)

Population (2020)
  - City: 85,420
  - Density: 4,181/sq mi (1,614.2/km^{2})
  - Metro: 4,285,832 (Metro Detroit)
- Time zone: UTC−5 (EST)
  - Summer (DST): UTC−4 (EDT)
- ZIP code(s): 48185, 48186, 48187
- Area code: 734
- FIPS code: 26-86000
- GNIS feature ID: 1616212
- Website: Official website

Westland is a city in Wayne County in the U.S. state of Michigan. A western suburb of Detroit, Westland is located about 18 miles (29 km) west of downtown Detroit. As of 2022, the city had a population of 84,037.

== History ==
=== Early history ===
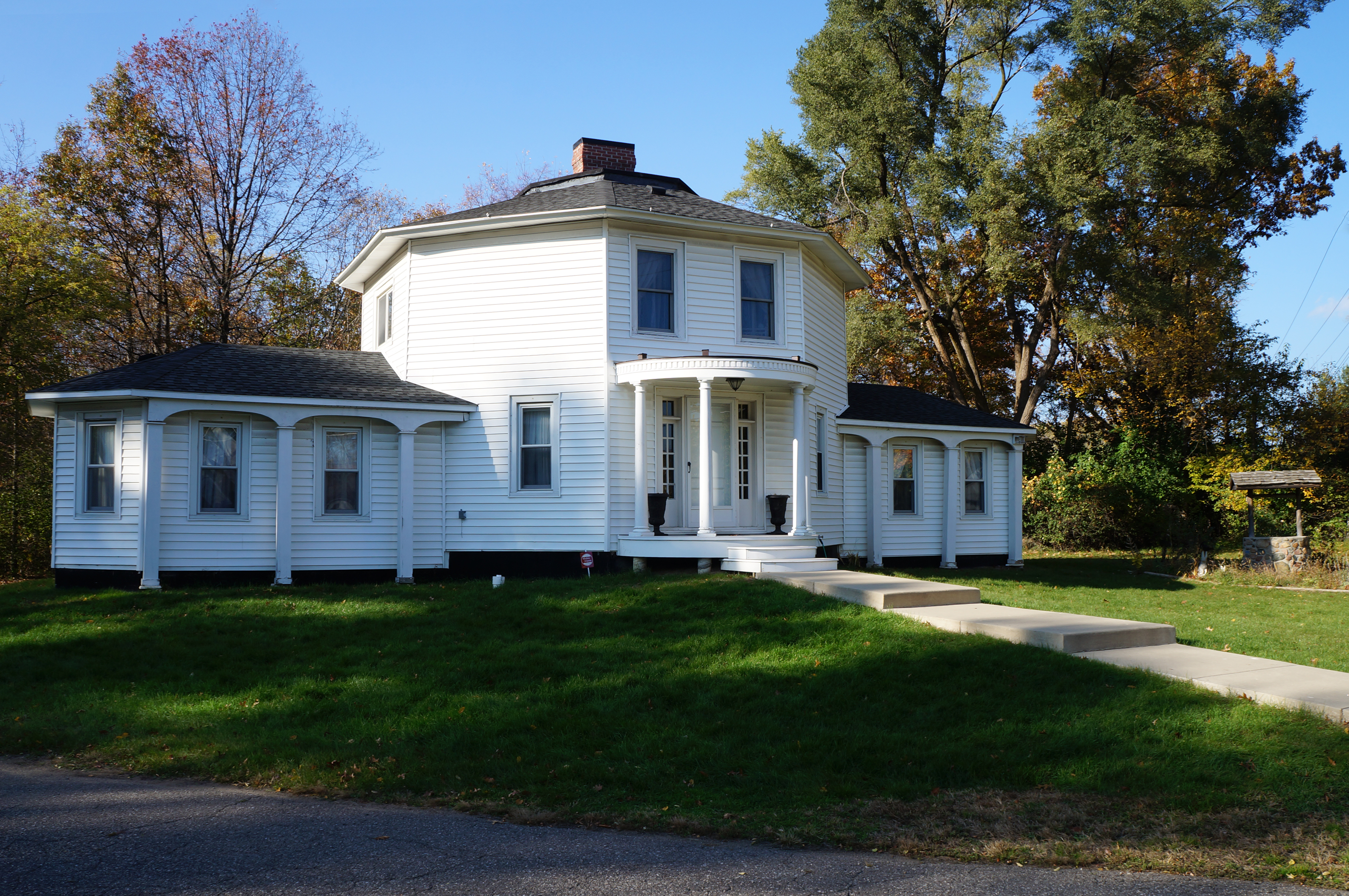
The Octagon House, part of the Westland Historical Park

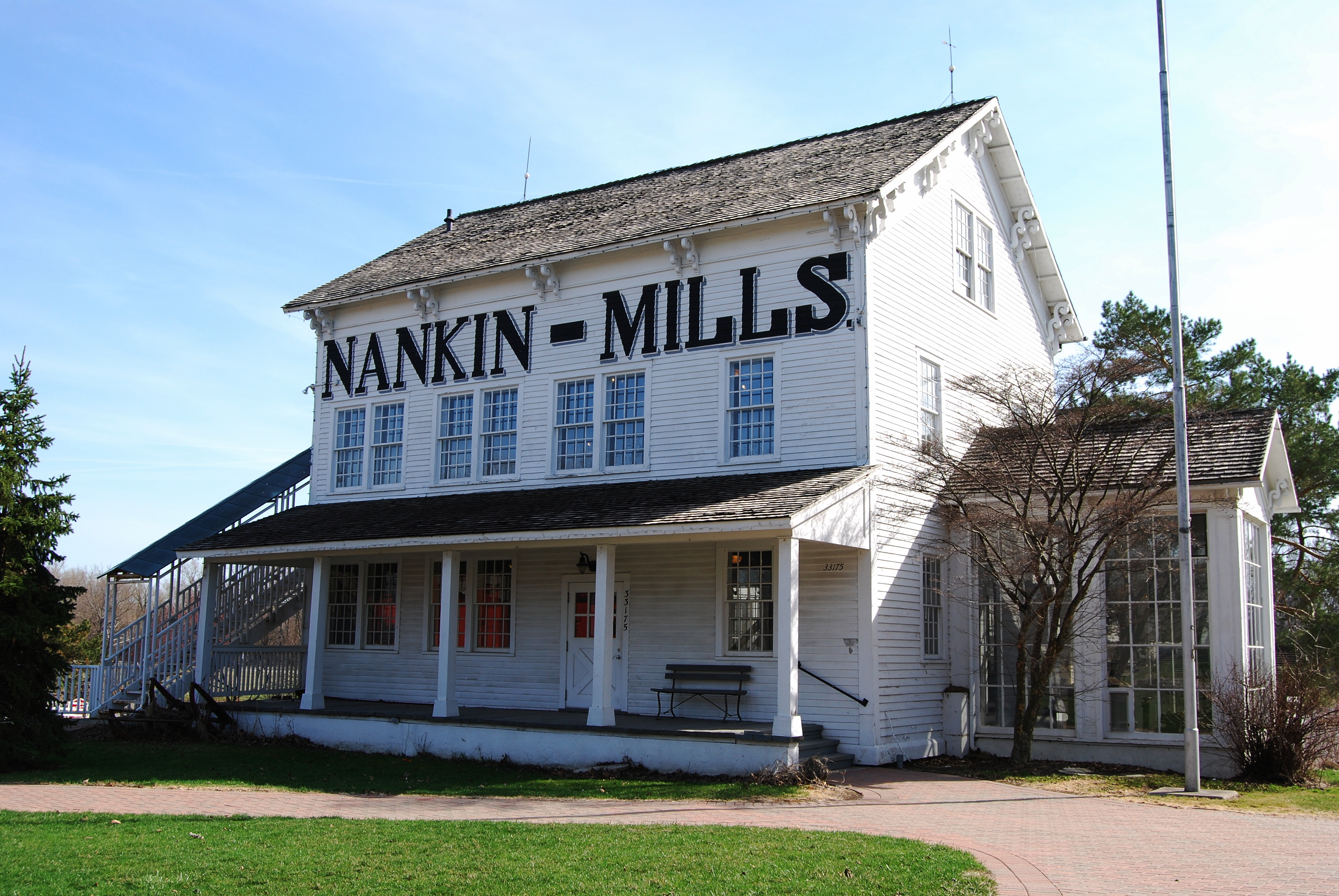
Nankin Mills

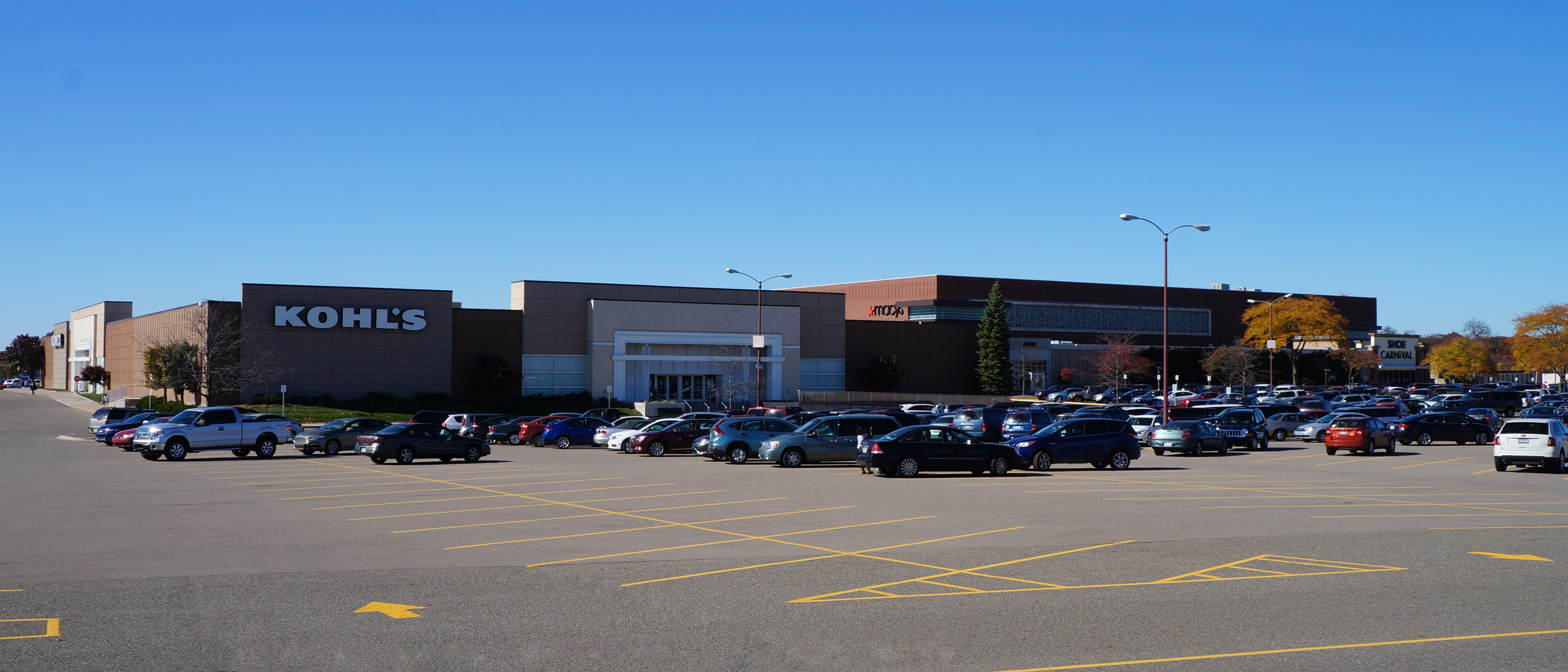
The Westland Shopping Center

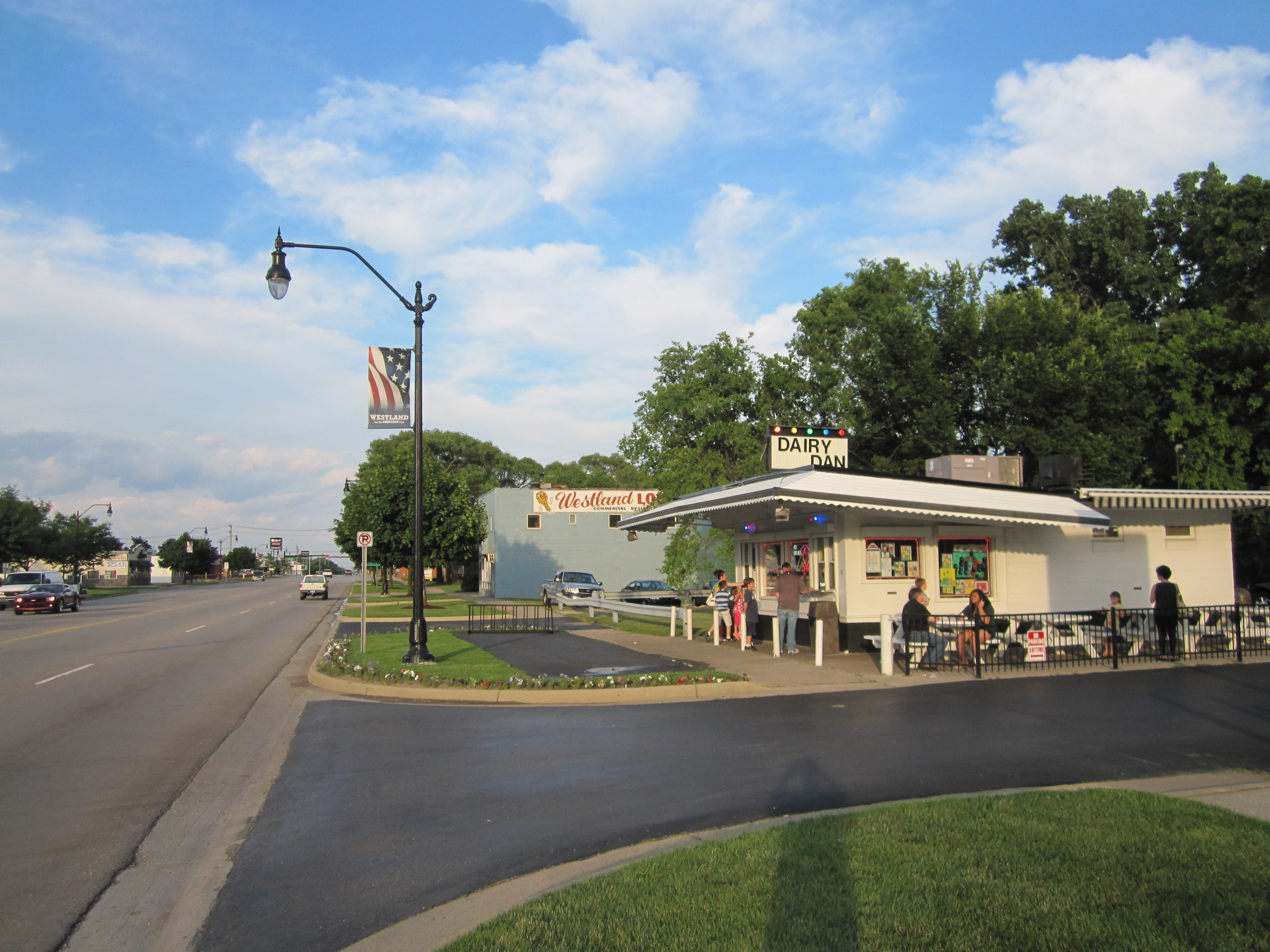
View from Ford Road (M-153) in central Westland, MI

During the 18th century, the area was inhabited by the people of a Potawatomi Native American village. Other tribes, particularly three Algonquian tribes, used the area as hunting territory. Though white settlers did not begin to settle the area until about 1824, they began passing through at the beginning of the 19th century.

Before becoming Westland, the area had several other names. In 1827, the area became known as Bucklin Township, which included what is now the cities of Westland, Livonia, Garden City, Inkster, Wayne, Dearborn, Dearborn Heights and Redford Township. In 1829, it was proposed that Bucklin Township be divided into Lima and Richland; the former is what eventually became Westland. Due to name conflicts under territorial law prohibiting duplication of post office names, Lima was renamed Nankin Township, after the Chinese city of Nanking, and Richland was renamed Pekin Township, after Peking.

=== Later history ===
Nankin Township was mostly rural until World War II. The Norwayne subdivision is one of the oldest areas of the city, having existed for over 65 years. The area was built immediately after World War II to provide temporary housing for returning soldiers who worked in nearby factories.

By 1960, Nankin Township's population had increased to 70,000, giving the area the distinction of being the state's largest township. During the early 1960s, the city of Livonia wanted to annex the part of Nankin in which a large shopping mall, Westland Shopping Center, was to be built. The shopping center eventually opened in 1965, joining Northland and Eastland malls in Southfield and Harper Woods, respectively. In reaction to Livonia's annexation attempts, the people of Nankin Township voted on May 16, 1966, to take all other territory to form the City Of Westland. At that time, it was the fourth largest city in Wayne County.

== Politics ==
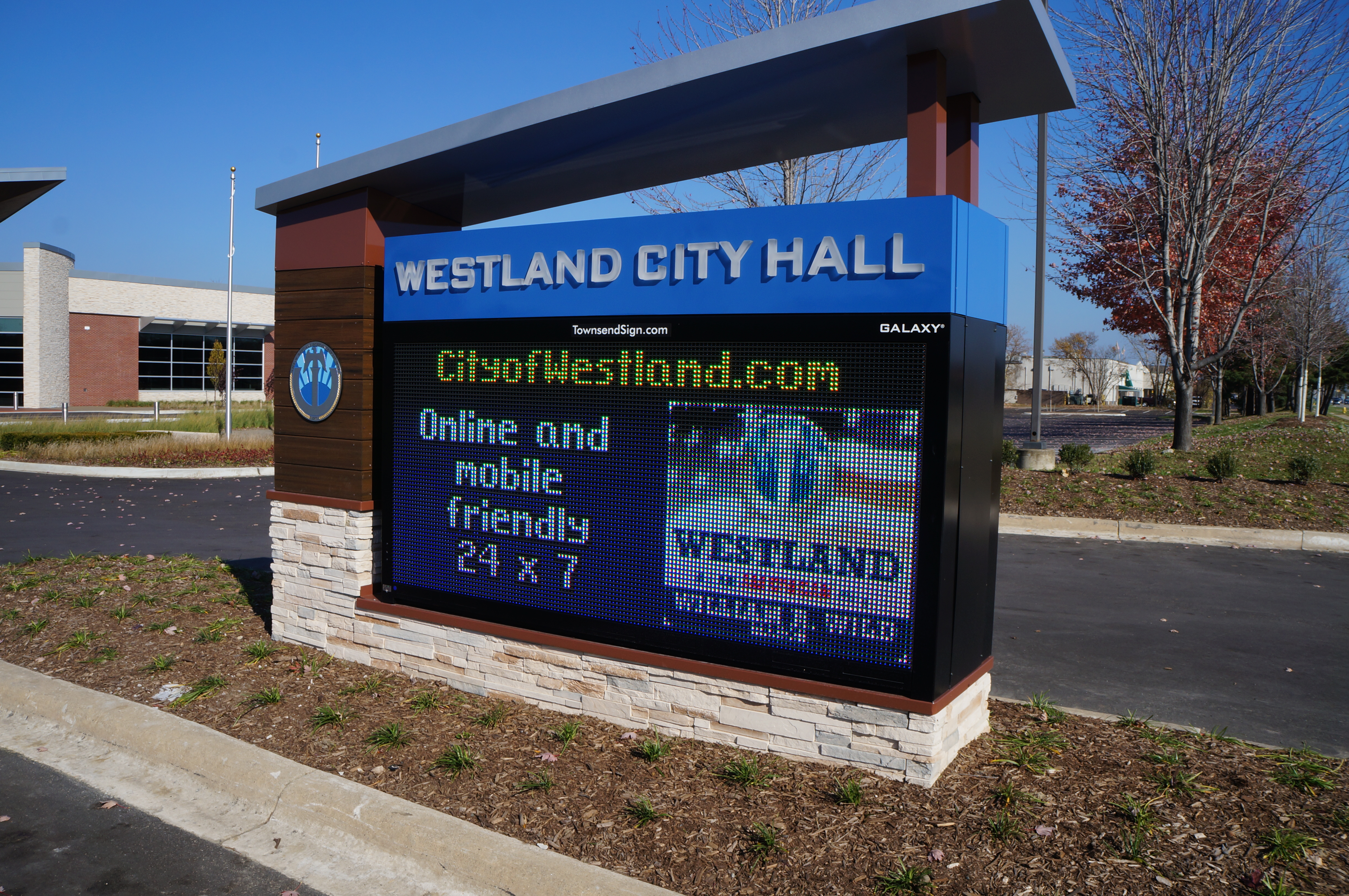
The Westland City Hall Sign

The current mayor of Westland is Kevin Coleman. The legislative body of Westland is the City Council, which contains seven members. The current president of the city council is Mike McDermott. Other council members are Council President Pro-Tem LeKisha Maxwell, Emily Bauman, Antoinette Martin, Melissa Sampey, Andrea Rutkowski, and John Sullivan.

== Education ==
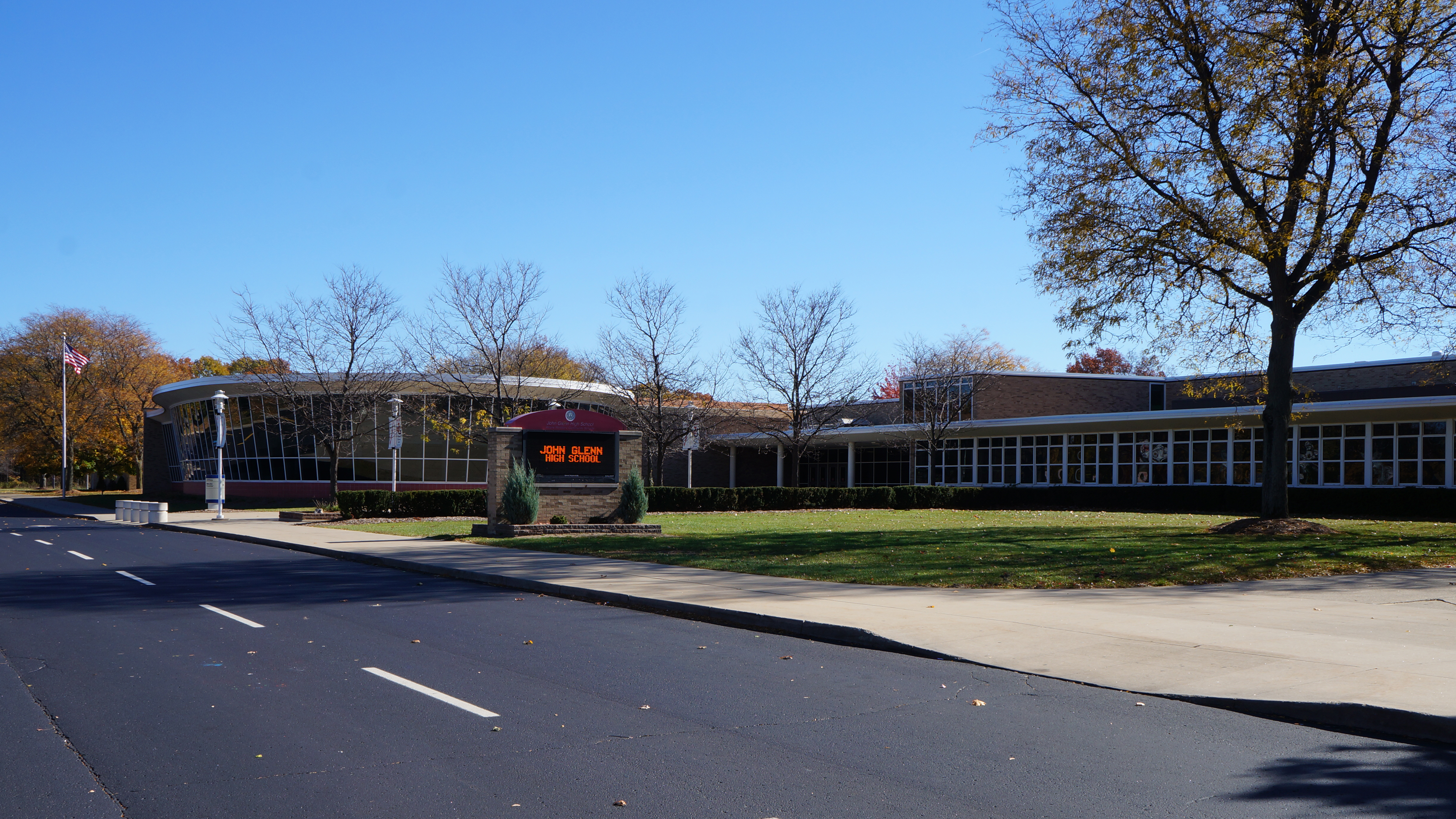
John Glenn High School

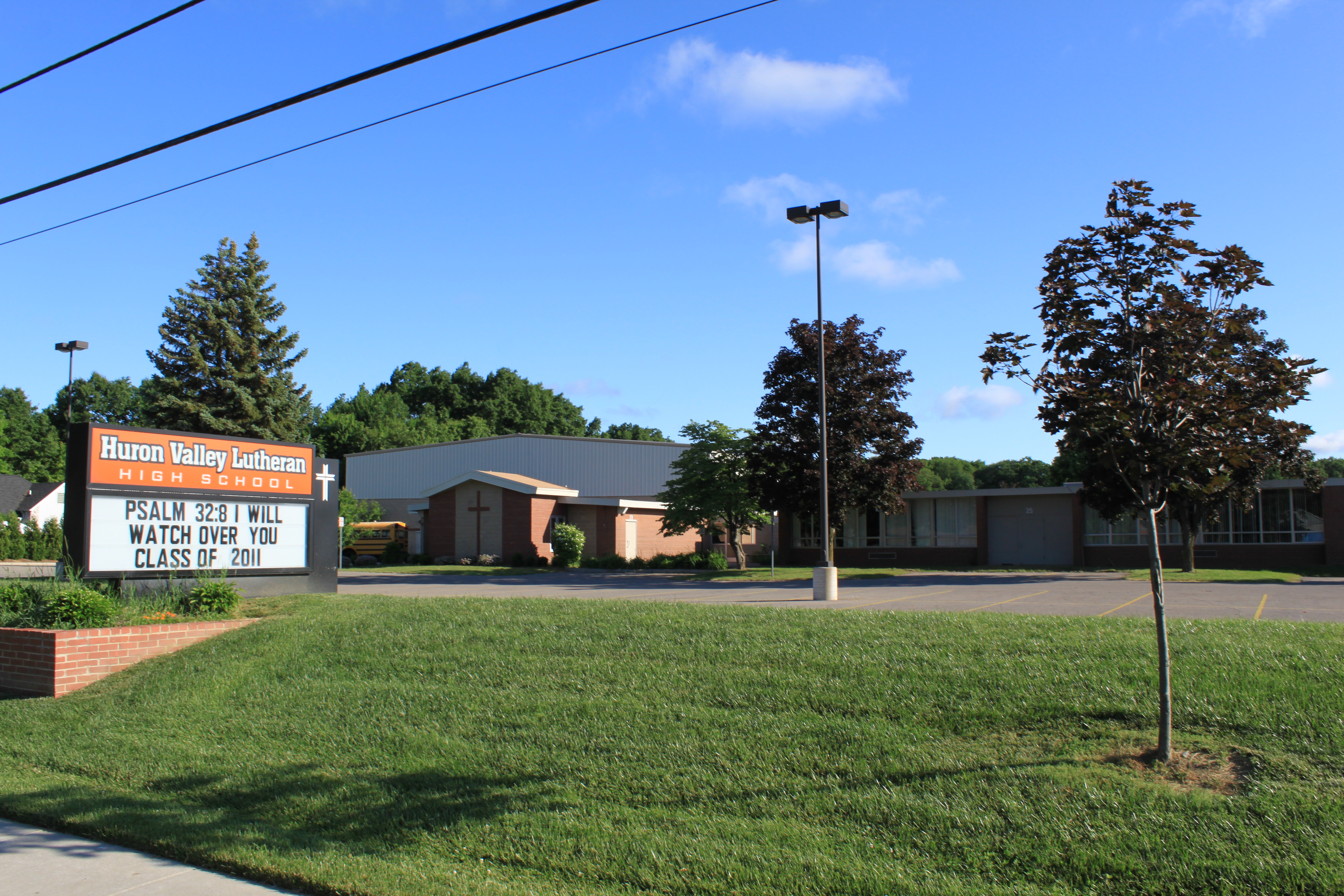
Huron Valley Lutheran High School

Westland and the city of Wayne form the Wayne-Westland Community School District. There are four high schools, John Glenn, Wayne Westland Community High School (formerly Tinkham Alternative Education), and William D. Ford Career Technical Center in Westland, and Wayne Memorial in Wayne. There is a historical site, Perrinsville School in Westland on Warren Road. Nearly all students that live in the city of Wayne go to Wayne Memorial High School, along with some residents of Van Buren Township, Inkster, Romulus, Canton and southern Westland. Students in central Westland and portions of northern Westland, as well as isolated areas of neighboring Inkster and Canton, attend John Glenn High School. The northernmost portions of Westland are in the Livonia Public Schools district.

Portions of Westland that had been in the Taylor School District prior to the 2013 dissolution of the Inkster School District are assigned to Taylor Parks Elementary School, Hoover Middle School, and Harry S. Truman High School in Taylor.

Portions in Livonia School District are assigned to Hayes (in Westland), Rosedale, Garfield, and Cleveland K-4 elementary schools. 5-6 elementary schools include Johnson Upper Elementary School (in Westland) and Cooper Upper Elementary School (in Westland). Livonia SD middle schools serving Westland include Frost and Emerson. Livonia SD high schools serving Westland include Churchill High School and Franklin High School.

There is a portion of southeastern Westland that is currently divided between Romulus Community Schools and the Taylor School District that was previously assigned to the Inkster School District. Romulus Senior High School is the assigned high school for Romulus students. Students in the Inkster zone previously attended Inkster High School.

There is a charter school in Westland, Universal Learning Academy.

Private schools:

- Lutheran High School Westland
- Hope Christian Academy, formerly Huron Valley Lutheran High School

== Geography ==
According to the United States Census Bureau, the city has a total area of 20.45 square miles (52.97 km^{2}), of which 20.43 square miles (52.91 km^{2}) is land and 0.02 square miles (0.05 km^{2}) is water.

== Demographics ==
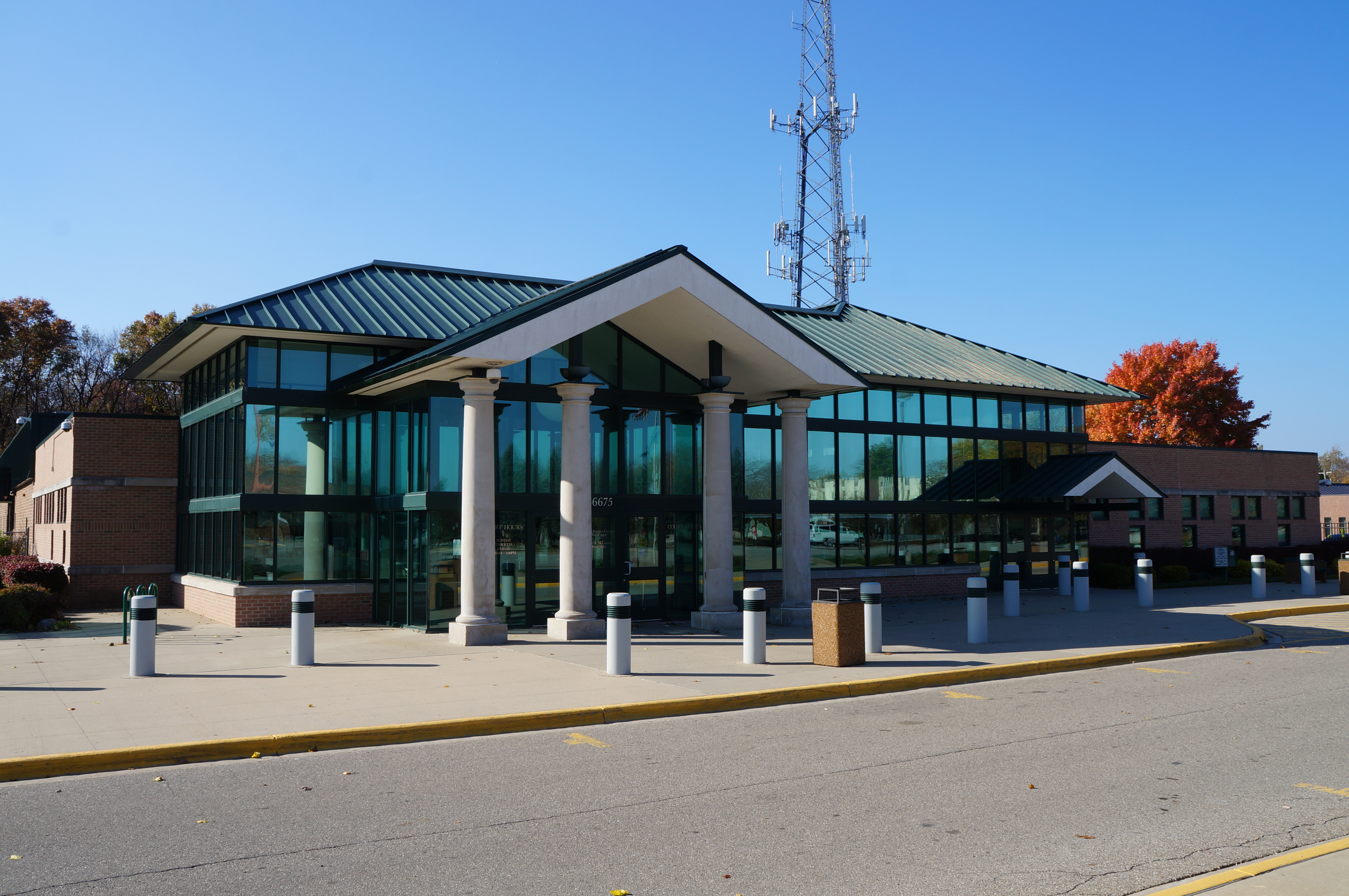
The 18th District Court, located in Westland

Historical population
Census	Pop.	Note	%±
1930	9,806		—
1940	15,838		61.5%
1950	30,407		92.0%
1960	60,743		99.8%
1970	86,749		42.8%
1980	84,603		−2.5%
1990	84,724		0.1%
2000	86,602		2.2%
2010	84,094		−2.9%
2020	85,420		1.6%
U.S. Decennial Census

=== Racial and ethnic composition ===
Westland, Michigan – Racial and ethnic composition Note: the US Census treats Hispanic/Latino as an ethnic category. This table excludes Latinos from the racial categories and assigns them to a separate category. Hispanics/Latinos may be of any race.
Race / Ethnicity (NH = Non-Hispanic)	Pop 2000	Pop 2010	Pop 2020	% 2000	% 2010	% 2020
White alone (NH)	74,116	61,826	54,273	85.58%	73.52%	63.54%
Black or African American alone (NH)	5,823	14,347	18,504	6.72%	17.06%	21.66%
Native American or Alaska Native alone (NH)	360	353	304	0.42%	0.42%	0.36%
Asian alone (NH)	2,427	2,526	3,682	2.80%	3.00%	4.31%
Native Hawaiian or Pacific Islander alone (NH)	25	13	12	0.03%	0.02%	0.01%
Other race alone (NH)	127	134	361	0.15%	0.16%	0.42%
Mixed race or Multiracial (NH)	1,586	1,730	4,424	1.83%	2.06%	5.18%
Hispanic or Latino (any race)	2,138	3,165	3,860	2.47%	3.76%	4.52%
Total	86,602	84,094	85,420	100.00%	100.00%	100.00%

=== 2020 census ===
As of the 2020 census, Westland had a population of 85,420. The median age was 39.7 years. 19.4% of residents were under the age of 18 and 16.9% of residents were 65 years of age or older. For every 100 females there were 91.4 males, and for every 100 females age 18 and over there were 89.0 males age 18 and over.

100.0% of residents lived in urban areas, while 0.0% lived in rural areas.

There were 37,677 households in Westland, of which 25.1% had children under the age of 18 living in them. Of all households, 33.8% were married-couple households, 23.0% were households with a male householder and no spouse or partner present, and 35.3% were households with a female householder and no spouse or partner present. About 36.6% of all households were made up of individuals and 14.3% had someone living alone who was 65 years of age or older.

There were 39,633 housing units, of which 4.9% were vacant. The homeowner vacancy rate was 1.4% and the rental vacancy rate was 5.9%.

Racial composition as of the 2020 census
Race	Number	Percent
White	55,371	64.8%
Black or African American	18,657	21.8%
American Indian and Alaska Native	418	0.5%
Asian	3,699	4.3%
Native Hawaiian and Other Pacific Islander	15	0.0%
Some other race	1,357	1.6%
Two or more races	5,903	6.9%

=== 2010 census ===
As of the census of 2010, there were 84,094 people, 35,886 households, and 21,289 families living in the city. The population density was 4,116.2 inhabitants per square mile (1,589.3/km^{2}). There were 39,201 housing units at an average density of 1,918.8 per square mile (740.9/km^{2}). The racial makeup of the city was 75.8% White, 17.2% African American, 0.5% Native American, 3.0% Asian, 1.1% from other races, and 2.4% from two or more races. Hispanic or Latino residents of any race were 3.8% of the population.

There were 35,886 households, of which 29.6% had children under the age of 18 living with them, 37.5% were married couples living together, 16.4% had a female householder with no husband present, 5.4% had a male householder with no wife present, and 40.7% were non-families. 34.3% of all households were made up of individuals, and 12.5% had someone living alone who was 65 years of age or older. The average household size was 2.31 and the average family size was 2.98.

The median age in the city was 38.3 years. 22.1% of residents were under the age of 18; 9.5% were between the ages of 18 and 24; 27.7% were from 25 to 44; 26.6% were from 45 to 64; and 14% were 65 years of age or older. The gender makeup of the city was 47.5% male and 52.5% female.

=== 2000 census ===
As of the census of 2000, there were 86,602 people, 36,533 households, and 22,248 families living in the city. The population density was 4,234.9 inhabitants per square mile (1,635.1/km^{2}). There were 38,077 housing units at an average density of 1,862.0 per square mile (718.9/km^{2}). The racial makeup of the city was 87.21% White, 6.77% African American, 0.46% Native American, 2.81% Asian, 0.03% Pacific Islander, 0.67% from other races, and 2.04% from two or more races. Hispanic or Latino residents of any race were 2.47% of the population.

There were 36,533 households, out of which 28.6% had children under the age of 18 living with them, 44.4% were married couples living together, 12.1% had a female householder with no husband present, and 39.1% were non-families. 32.6% of all households were made up of individuals, and 11.3% had someone living alone who was 65 years of age or older. The average household size was 2.34 and the average family size was 3.00.

In the city, 23.3% of the population was under the age of 18, 9.0% was from 18 to 24, 33.9% from 25 to 44, 20.6% from 45 to 64, and 13.2% was 65 years of age or older. The median age was 35 years. For every 100 females, there were 92.6 males. For every 100 females age 18 and over, there were 89.6 males.

The median income for a household in the city was $46,308, and the median income for a family was $55,323. Males had a median income of $45,111 versus $30,143 for females. The per capita income for the city was $22,615. About 4.7% of families and 6.8% of the population were below the poverty line, including 7.6% of those under age 18 and 6.9% of those aged 65 or over.

== City services ==
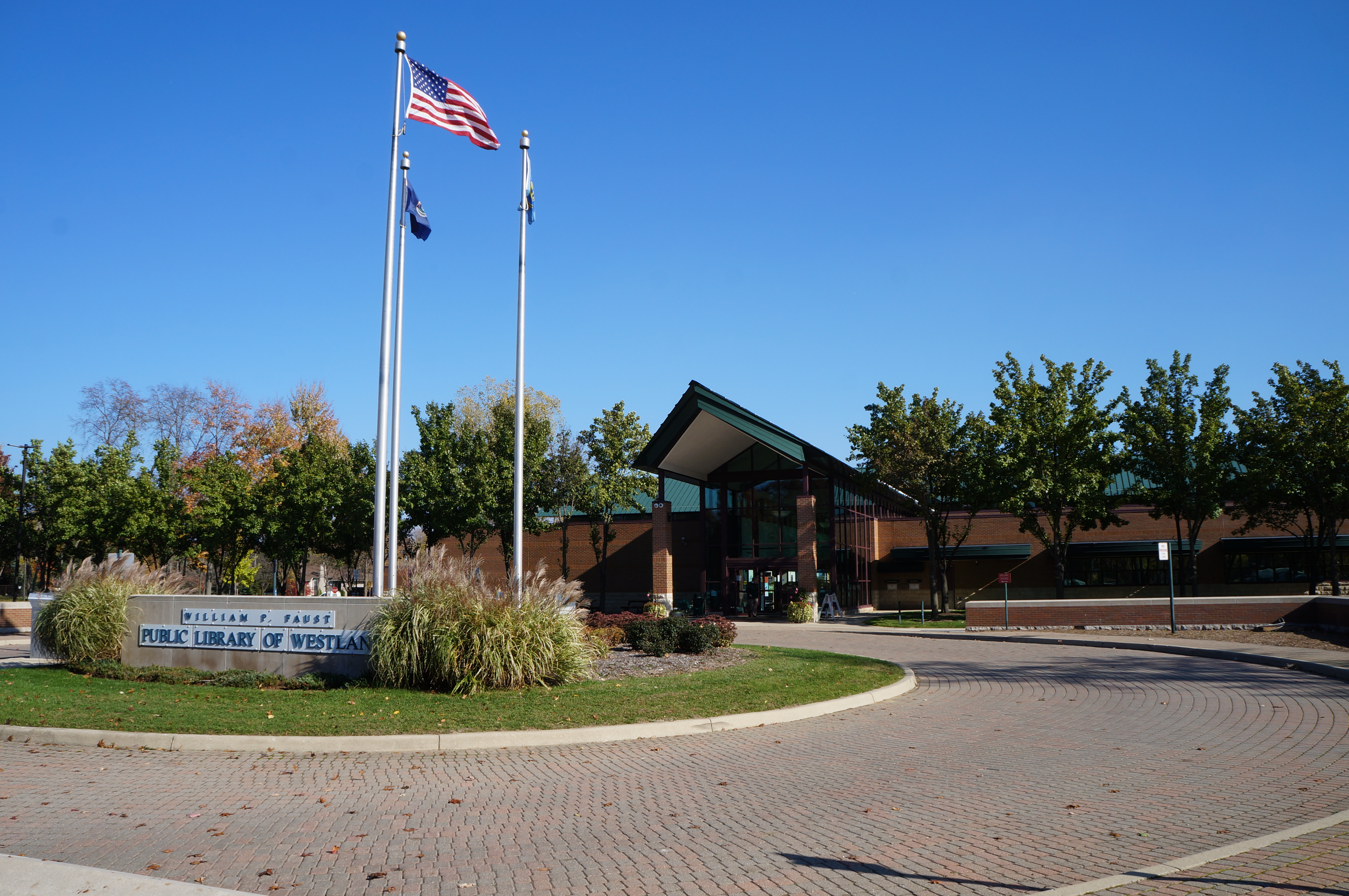
The William P. Faust Public Library

Westland has a full-time police department and fire department. The fire department offers advanced EMS, fire protection and prevention, and several specialized rescue teams.

The city is known for having an abundance of parks. Hines Park (Wayne County Parks) is located in the northern region of Westland. Residents along this corridor enjoy seeing deer, foxes, and hummingbirds all year long as well as easy access to the bike paths of Hines Park. Westland also has numerous City-owned parks throughout many of the neighborhoods. Many residents from surrounding cities go to Hines Park year-round.

The Westland Public Library (or William P. Faust Public Library of Westland) offers books, magazines, CDs, playaways, videos, DVDs, and electronic materials through access to subscription databases.

The City of Westland offers automated recycling services. For waste disposal, residents have black bins for garbage, and blue bins for recycling. Recycle bins are picked up every other week, while trash is picked up weekly.

The former Eloise psychiatric hospital is due as of 2021 to be redeveloped as a commercial centre and hotel. The building dates back to 1839: the Wayne County Hospital ceased operating from the site in 1984, and it was used as offices for Wayne County employees up until 2016.

There are numerous Nature trails near Westland, Newburg lake is the nearest one to Westland.

== Notable people ==
- Mike Modano, NHL Hall of Fame hockey player
- Daron Cruickshank, MMA Fighter, UFC
- Josh Gracin, country singer
- Ryan Scott Graham, musician
- Eric Haase, catcher, Milwaukee Brewers
- Danielle Hartsell, pair skater
- Steve Hartsell, pair skater
- Motoko Fujishiro Huthwaite, teacher, served in World War II
- Mike Kelley, artist
- Jeremy Langford, running back, Chicago Bears
- Charlie LeDuff, journalist and author
- Wanda Young, singer, The Marvelettes
