= Walled Lake =

Walled Lake may refer to:

- Walled Lake, Michigan, a city in Michigan
  - Walled Lake Consolidated Schools, a school district with its headquarters in Walled Lake, Michigan
    - Walled Lake Central High School
    - Walled Lake Northern High School
    - Walled Lake Western High School
- Walled Lake (Michigan), a lake near Walled Lake, Michigan

== See also ==
- Wall Lake (disambiguation)
