= Alina Morse =

American child candy entrepreneur

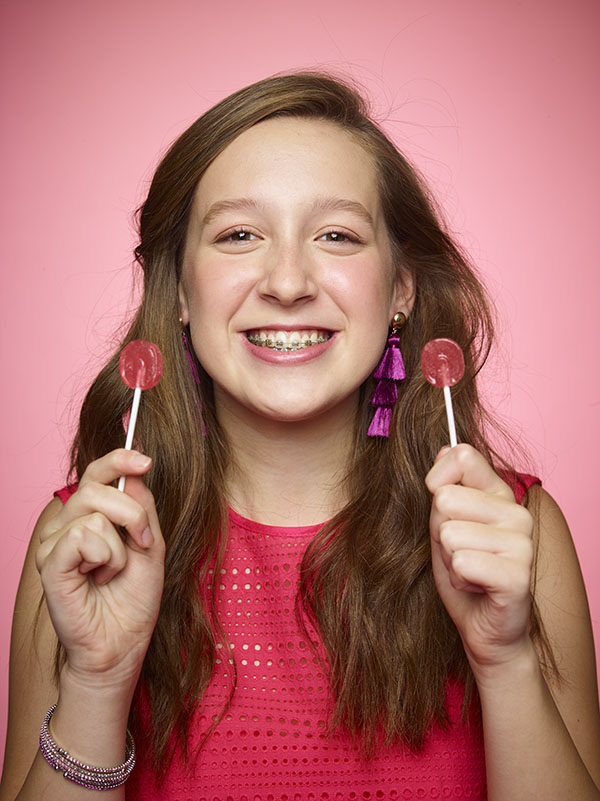
- Morse with two Zollipops in 2018
- Born: May 8, 2005 (age 20); Wolverine Lake, Michigan, US
- Occupation: Chief executive officer of Zolli Candy
- Years active: 2014–present
- Known for: Entrepreneurship

Alina Morse (born May 8, 2005) is an American entrepreneur, the CEO of Zolli Candy, which she founded when she was ten years old. Her company sells the candy she developed: sugar free lollipops called Zollipops, hard candy called Zolli Drops, and taffy called Zaffi Taffy. The candy is sold online and in about 25,000 stores in the United States and internationally, totaling US$6 million in sales in 2018. She was the youngest person to be on the cover of Entrepreneur Magazine, and she was twice invited to the White House by First Lady Michelle Obama. In addition to being the CEO of a multi-million-dollar company, Morse attends Michigan State University and dances competitively.

== Personal life ==
Morse lives with her parents and younger sister Lola in Wolverine Lake, Michigan. Her mother Suzanne formerly worked in sales, and her father Tom was a consultant for Deloitte; all now participate in the company, with Tom working as Alina's manager and handling meetings when she is busy, Suzanne as her coach, schedule organizer, and stylist, and Lola making videos for the company YouTube channel. Tom has called working for her one of the most fulfilling things that he has done in his life.

Morse attends Walled Lake Central High School in Commerce Township, Michigan and dances competitively in ballet, hip-hop, and jazz dance. During the school year, she balances the company with school work and dance practice; during the summer, she spends more time with the business. The company takes 35 to 40 percent of her time. After graduating high school, Morse is studying finance and entrepreneurship at Michigan State University.

== Company ==
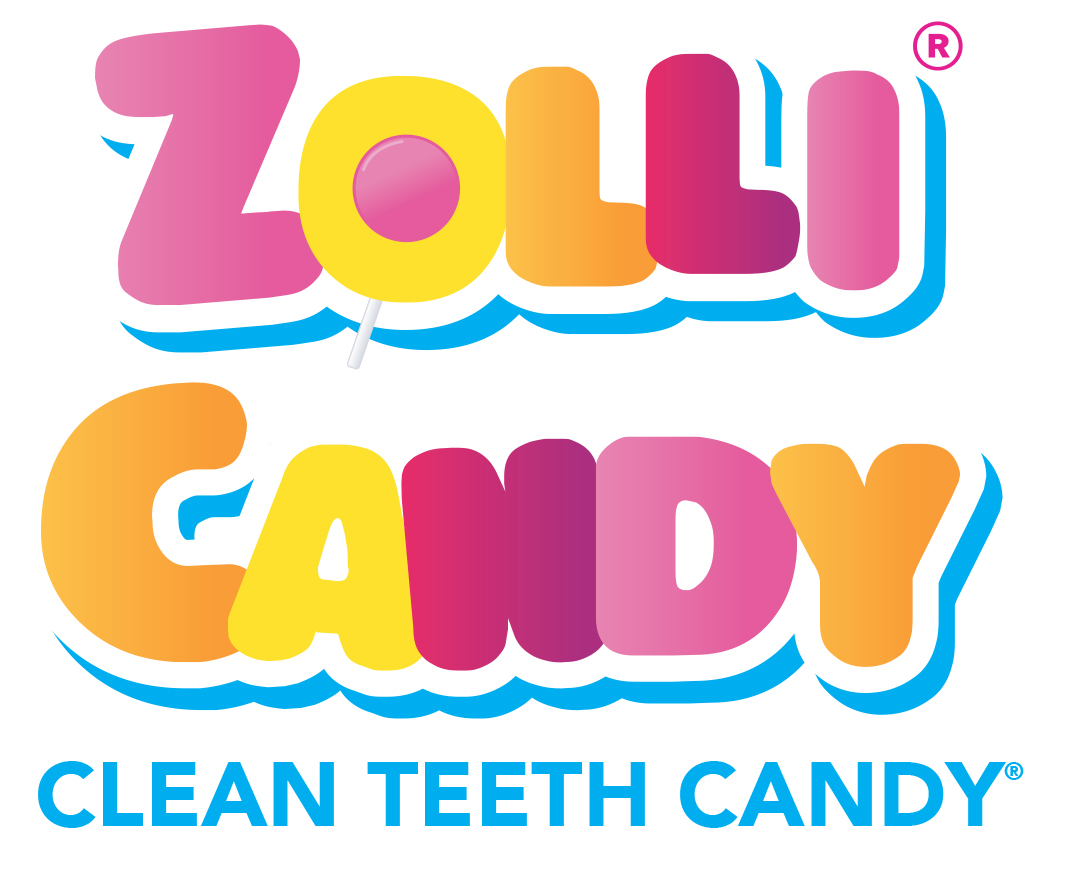
Logo for Zolli Candy

Morse's company is formally named Liquid OTC LLC, doing business as LOL, but most know it as Zolli Candy, or by the name of its flagship product, Zollipops. It is headquartered in her home town, Wolverine Lake, Michigan, 30 miles northwest of Detroit, with seven full-time employees and several independent contractors. Alina and Lola Morse are the majority owners of the company, making it a woman owned business.

Total 2018 Zolli Candy sales at retail reached US$6 million (with US$2.2 million in company revenue), while Morse was 13 years old. As of 2019 Zolli Candy was on shelves in 25,000 stores, including the United States and internationally in China, Korea, France, and the United Kingdom.

=== Company history ===
Morse has wanted to be a CEO since she was three years old. She started keeping ideas for business inventions in an idea binder from the age of four. These ideas included peanut butter and jelly that squirted from the same tube to make it easier for children to prepare their own sandwiches and a robot parent that would substitute for her father at work so he could stay home and play with her.

The idea for Zollipops, the sugar-free lollipops that are the company's flagship product, originated in 2012. Morse, seven years old, was at a bank with her father, when she was offered a lollipop that her father stopped her from eating, saying that it would rot her teeth. Morse began thinking about making a lollipop that would not. She asked her father over 100 times for four to five months before he agreed to help.

It took two years of online research and at least a hundred unsuccessful experiments in their home oven, stove, and microwave. Making the candy in molds at home did not work and only made messes. Morse collaborated with a food scientist and her dentist on the ingredients. When she settled on a formula, Morse invested her life savings, $3,750 from birthday and holiday gifts, and got her father to match it. Morse and her father traveled to different commercial manufacturing plants throughout Michigan to find one with the equipment they needed. They eventually proposed their product to Whole Foods Market. It was Zollipops' first retail placement, and it was a success.

The company became profitable a year and a half after its 2014 launch. Seventy thousand Zollipops were sold the first year, and sales doubled each year from 2014 through 2018. In 2016, Zollipops were picked up by Kroger, America's largest supermarket chain. Online sales began soon after Whole Foods, via Amazon, making up approximately a quarter of total sales. By 2018, Zollipops were both Amazon's best selling sugar-free hard candy and best selling lollipops.

=== Products ===
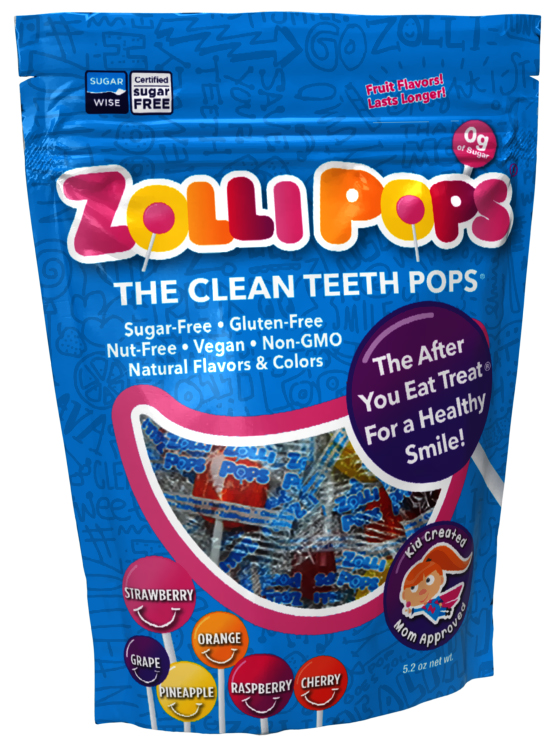
Bag of Zollipops

The Zolli candies are made with natural sweeteners including xylitol and erythritol instead of sugar. Some studies, including some in the International Journal of Dentistry, have found these sweeteners reduce dental plaque and oral bacteria. Other ingredients include citric acid, stevia, beetroot juice, and turmeric for color. Morse is allergic to artificial dyes and colors, and she has a friend who is allergic to peanuts and another who is allergic to gluten, so insisted all those be left out. The candies include Zollipops lollipops, Zolli Drops hard candy, and Zaffi Taffy taffy, in seven flavors: cherry, grape, orange, peppermint, pineapple, raspberry, and strawberry. They are sugar-free, gluten-free, dairy-free, vegan, and non-GMO. The "z" sound of "xylitol" is the origin of the "Z" in the name Zollipops, which was created by Morse's younger sister Lola, who had trouble saying "xylitol lollipop".

=== Million Smiles Initiative ===
In February 2015, in support of the American Dental Association National Children's Dental Health Month campaign, Morse and her company launched a "100,000 Smiles" campaign to give away 100,000 Zollipops for free to dentists and schools and donate 10 percent of Zolli Candy profits to schools for oral health education. By 2016, this became the "250,000 Smiles" campaign to give away 250,000 Zollipops and 10% of Zollipops profits. In 2018, to celebrate Zollipops being sold through Walmart, Morse announced the program was being expanded to "One Million Smiles", promising to give away 1,000,000 lollipops. In 2019 this became "Two Million Smiles" when Zolli Candy expanded to 10,000 stores.

== Recognition ==
Morse has been the company spokesperson since presenting to Whole Foods Market for its launch in 2014. In 2015, aged nine, she appeared on the Steve Harvey television show, saying "I hope every kid in America has a clean mouth, a healthy smile and a Zollipop in their hands". Her appearances were a powerful marketing tool, and with time her answers became less scripted. She has since appeared on Good Morning America, in a 2017 edition of Ripley's Believe It or Not!, Fox Business, National Public Radio, and she was interviewed by CNN on the floor of the New York Stock Exchange.

In 2015 and 2016 Morse was invited to the White House Easter Egg Roll by First Lady Michelle Obama; Zollipops were the only candy served there.

In September 2018, Morse became the youngest person to appear on the cover of Entrepreneur Magazine. She was listed in the 2019 Success Magazine "30 under 30", and the InStyle Magazine "Badass 50 Women" lists. Zolli Candy was recognized by the 2019 Michigan "50 Companies to Watch" small business program and was listed as #635 on the "2019 Inc. 5000: The Most Successful Companies in America" list.
