= Kittie C. McCoy House =

- U.S. National Register of Historic Places
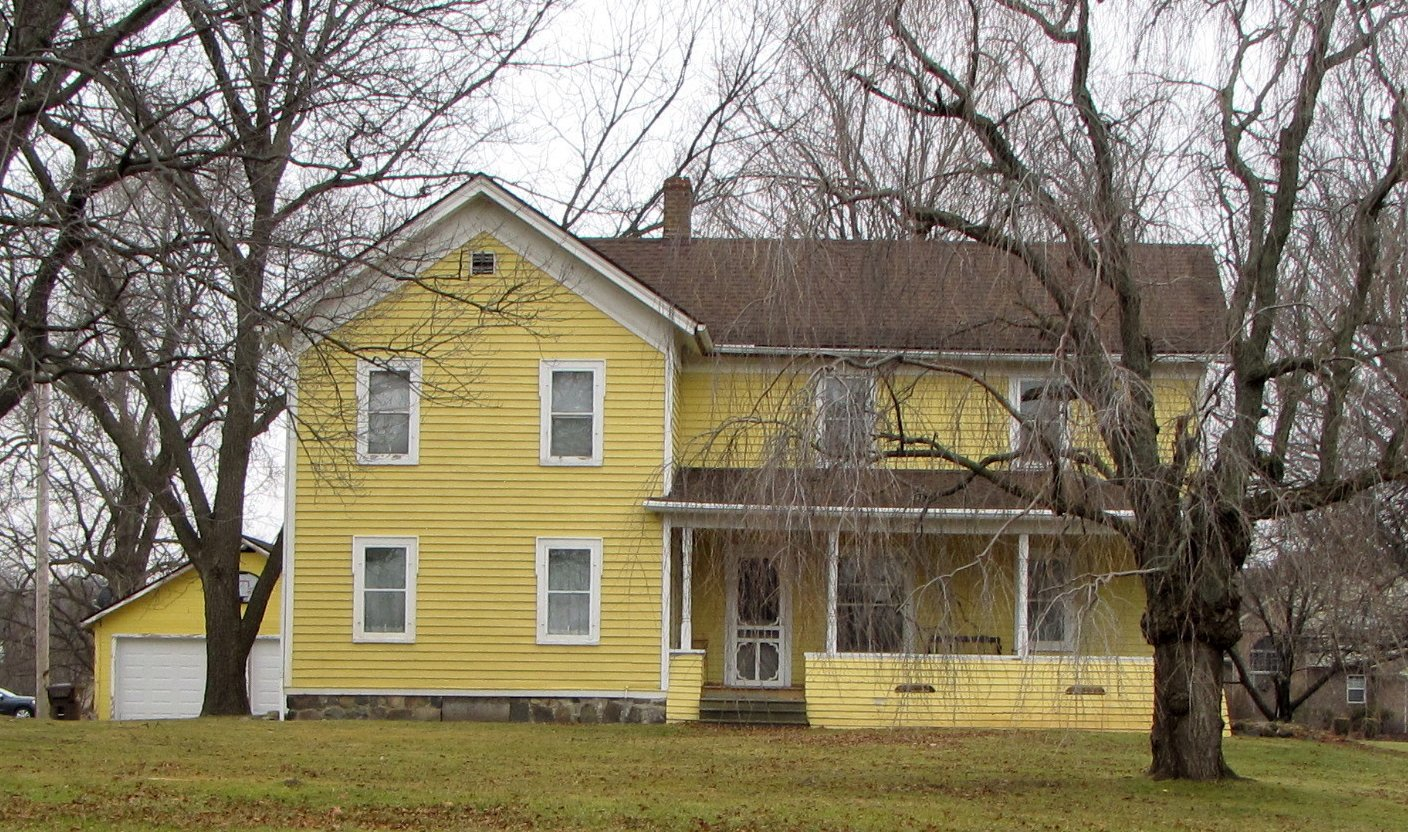
- Interactive map
- Location: 1455 Benstein Rd., Commerce Township, Michigan
- Coordinates: 42°32′40″N 83°30′12″W
- Area: less than one acre
- Built: c. 1860
- Architectural style: Gabled ell house
- NRHP reference No.: 08001105
- Added to NRHP: March 25, 2009

The Kittie C. McCoy House is a single-family home located at 1455 Benstein Road in Commerce Township, Michigan. It was listed on the National Register of Historic Places in 2009.

== History ==
Thomas Henry McCoy was born in 1848, in Commerce Township. In 1873, he purchased the acreage surrounding this house now sits on. There is evidence that the house was already built at that time, most likely in the 1850s or 1860s. In 1879, McCoy married Catherine Jane ("Kittie") Cuthbertson. Kittie was born in 1854 near Orchard Lake.

Over the years, Kittie McCoy developed a local reputation as a poet, writing numerous poems commemorating events and celebrations. In 1886 she published Buds and Blossoms, a collection of her poems. Thomas and Kittie McCoy raised a family in this house, and lived in it themselves until 1910 when Thomas dies. Later that year Kittie moved to Milford, Michigan and continued to write poetry until her own death in 1917.

== Description ==
The Kittie C. McCoy House is a simple two-story gabled-ell farmhouse with a one-story, gabled rear ell. It has a fieldstone foundation and is clad with clapboard, with cornerboards. It has projecting eaves with raking cornices. The front of the house has a hip-roof porch covering the main entry. All the windows save one near the entry are narrow one=over-one units.

== See also ==
- National Register of Historic Places listings in Oakland County, Michigan
