= Proud Lake State Recreation Area =

State park in Michigan, United States

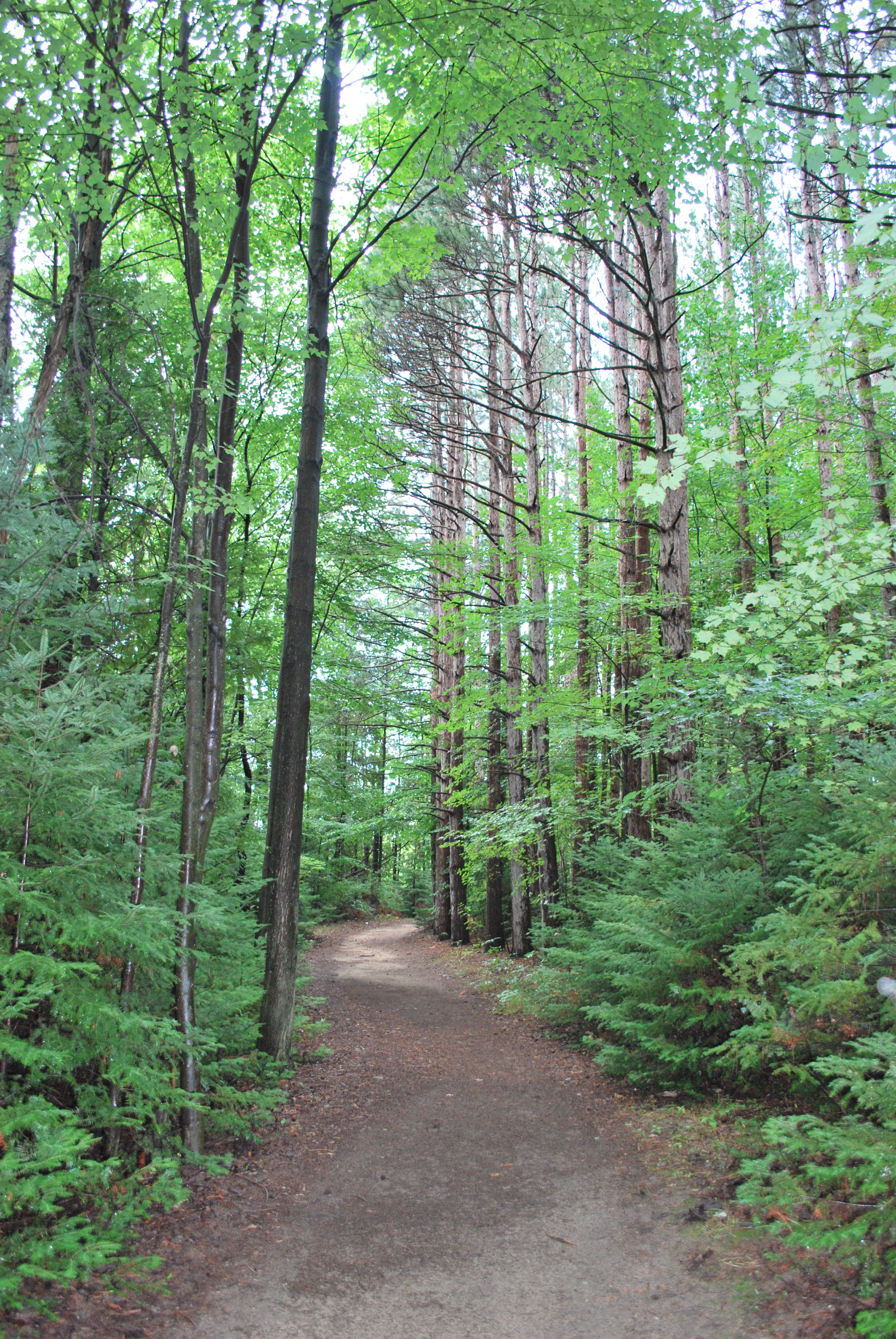

- Location within Michigan Location within the United States
- Location: Lower Peninsula, Oakland County, Michigan USA
- Nearest city: Wixom, Michigan
- Coordinates: 42°34′03″N 83°32′48″W
- Area: 3,030 acres (1,230 ha)
- Governing body: Michigan Department of Natural Resources
- Website: Official website

Proud Lake State Recreation Area is a state-managed public park and recreation area located in Commerce Township, Oakland County, Michigan, near Wixom. It is under the jurisdiction of the Michigan Department of Natural Resources. The recreation area has a total area of 3,030 acres (12.3 km^{2}) and offers various outdoor activities including 20 miles (32 km) of hiking trails (9 miles of which are open to horses and mountain bikes), cross-country skiing, fishing in the Huron River, hunting (in limited areas), canoeing, and picnicking. A campground has 130 campsites and a 24-person cabin for rent.

== History ==
Proud Lake State Recreation Area was one of ten state recreation areas in southeast Michigan established in 1944.
