= Rockwell Medical =

Rockwell Medical Inc.
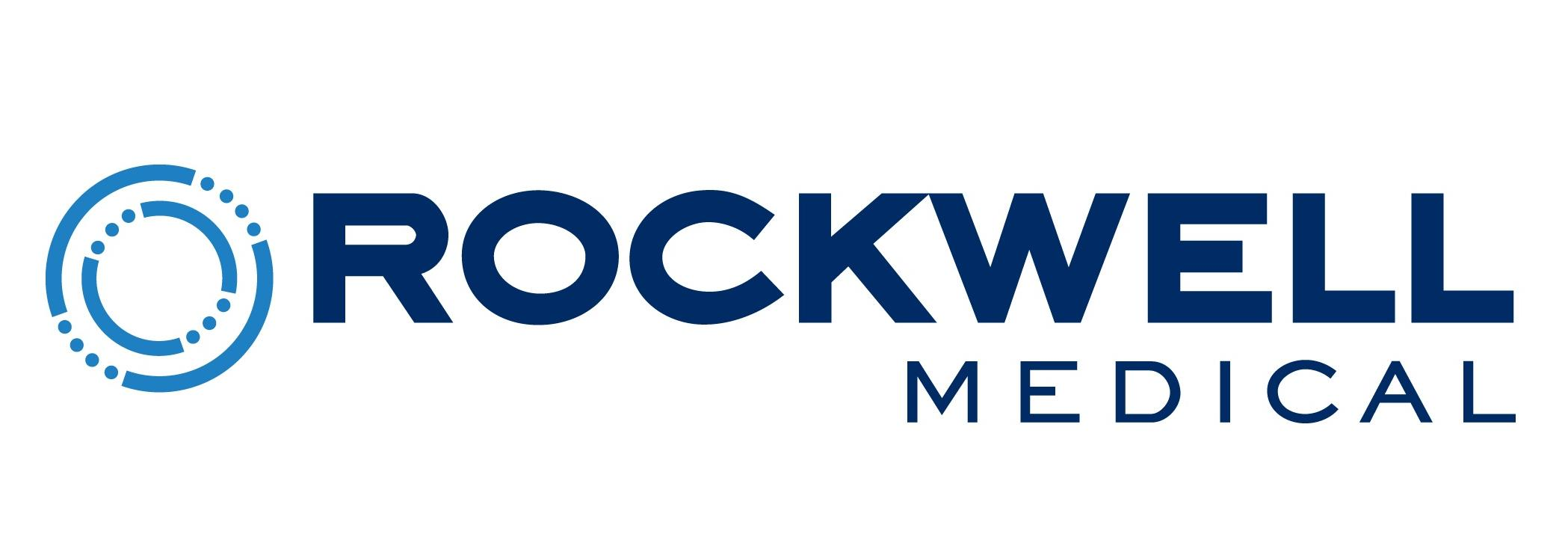
- Company type: Public
- Traded as: Nasdaq: RMTI; Russell 2000 Index component
- Industry: Pharmaceutical industry
- Founded: 1996; 30 years ago
- Headquarters: Wixom, Michigan
- Key people: Stuart Paul (president and CEO); Ajay Gupta (CSO); Raymond D. Pratt (CMO)
- Revenue: ▲$63 million (2018)
- Net income: ▼ -$32 million (2018)
- Total assets: ▼$52 million (2018)
- Total equity: ▼$27 million (2018)
- Number of employees: 269 (2018)
- Website: rockwellmed.com

Rockwell Medical Inc. is a publicly traded pharmaceutical company based in Wixom, Michigan and founded in 1996 that focuses on development and commercialization of treatments against diseases such as end-stage renal disease (ESRD) and chronic kidney disease (CKD).

The company's primary customers are dialysis providers.

== Products ==
=== Triferic ===
Triferic was approved by the Food and Drug Administration (FDA) in January 2015. Triferic is the only FDA-approved therapy indicated to replace iron and maintain hemoglobin in adult hemodialysis patients with chronic kidney disease. Triferic replaces the iron lost during hemodialysis treatments. Triferic delivers iron directly to transferrin which transports it to the bone marrow to make hemoglobin. Rockwell is actively marketing and commercializing Triferic in the U.S. hemodialysis market. In February 2014, the Company completed its long-term safety study for Triferic.

Rockwell Medical began commercializing Triferic (dialysate) and Triferic AVNU (intravenous) in the United States in the second half of 2019 and in early 2021, respectively. Triferic was launched into a very competitive marketplace with well-entrenched products and a lack of consensus regarding unmet medical needs for dialysis patients with anemia. Due to its limited market adoption, unfavorable reimbursement, and absence of interest from other companies to license or acquire Triferic despite Rockwell's significant effort to partner the program, Rockwell Medical discontinued its New Drug Applications (“NDAs”) for Triferic and Triferic AVNU in the United States in the fourth quarter of 2022.

=== Calcitriol ===
Calcitriol (active vitamin D) generic is FDA approved for treating secondary hyperparathyroidism or hypocalcemia in hemodialysis patients.

=== Hemodialysis Concentrates ===
Rockwell is a manufacturer of hemodialysis concentrates/dialysates for dialysis providers and distributors in the U.S. and globally. Hemodialysis concentrates remove toxins and replace critical nutrients in the dialysis patient's bloodstream during hemodialysis. Rockwell has three U.S. manufacturing and distribution facilities.

=== Iron (III) pyrophosphate ===
One of the main treatments that the company develops is iron (III) pyrophosphate, for iron supplementation, a key element in the formation of new red blood cells. It was licensed in 2011 for the delivery of iron supplementation for patients who suffer from anemic dialysis since the process accounts for treatment in around 90% of anemia patients.

International Partnerships

While Rockwell has discontinued commercialization of Triferic in the United States, the company has established international partnerships with companies seeking to develop and commercialize Triferic outside the United States and is working closely with these international partners to develop and commercialize Triferic in their respective regions.

South Korea for example; Triferic and Triferic AVNU have been approved in South Korea, and our partner, Jeil Pharmaceutical, launched Triferic in South Korea during the third quarter of 2022.

Also, in April 2023, Drogsan submitted a Marketing Authorization application and GMP application for Triferic AVNU to the Turkish Medicines and Medical Devices Agency ("TMMDA"), for which Drogsan received priority status and high priority status, respectively. Taking into consideration that Drogsan was granted an accelerated review for Triferic AVNU with the Turkish regulatory authority, Rockwell anticipates approval for Triferic AVNU in Turkey in 2024. Drogsan is responsible for all regulatory approval and commercialization activities.
