= Wall Lake =

Wall Lake may refer to a location in the United States:

- Wall Lake, Indiana, a census-designated place
- Wall Lake, Iowa, a city
- Wall Lake, Minnesota, an unincorporated community
- Wall Lake (Minnesota), a lake near Wall Lake, Minnesota
- A lake near Delton, Michigan
- A lake near Hartford, South Dakota

== See also ==
- Walled Lake (disambiguation)
