= St. Catherine of Siena Academy =

Location
- 28200 Napier Road; Wixom, Oakland County, Michigan 48393; United States
- 42°29′42″N 83°33′13″W

Information
- Type: Private
- Motto: Caritas, Veritas (From knowledge follows love Literal translation: Love, Truth)
- Religious affiliation: Roman Catholic
- Established: 2008
- School district: Archdiocese of Detroit
- CEEB code: 233-789
- President: Lia Johnston
- Principal: Judith Hehs
- Chaplain: Richard J. Elmer, C.S.B.
- Grades: 9–12
- Gender: Girls
- Colors: Purple and Gold
- Athletics conference: Catholic High School League; Michigan High School Athletic Association
- Team name: Stars
- Accreditation: Michigan Association of Non-Public Schools
- Website: saintcatherineacademy.org

St. Catherine of Siena Academy is a private Roman Catholic girls' high school in Wixom, Michigan, United States.
