= Commerce Township, Michigan =

- Charter township
- Charter Township of Commerce
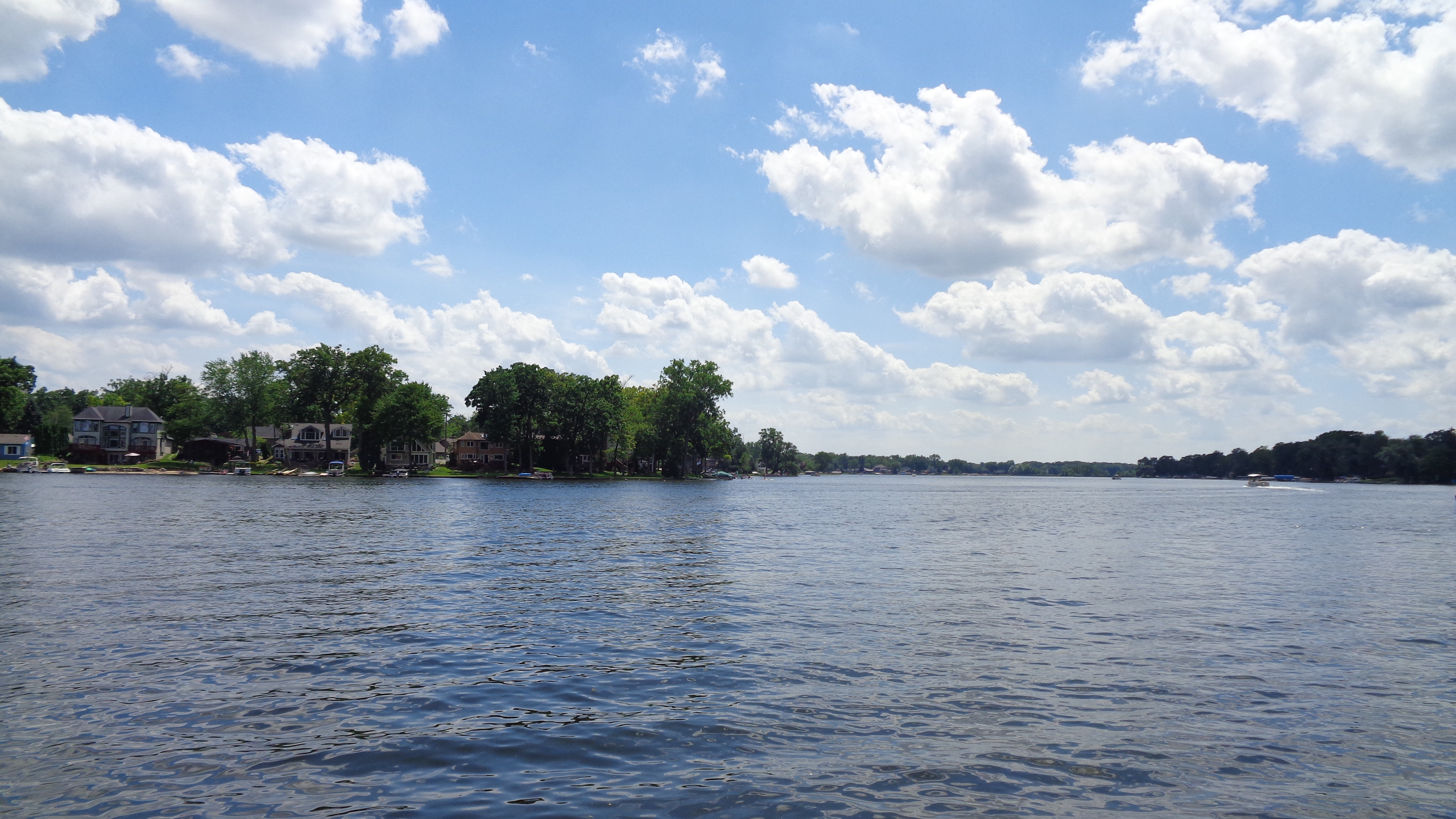
- Wolverine Lake within Commerce Township

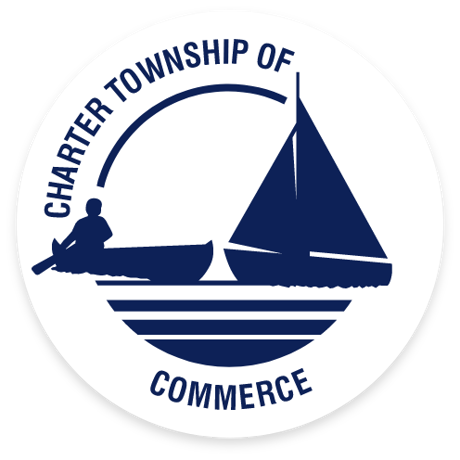
- Logo

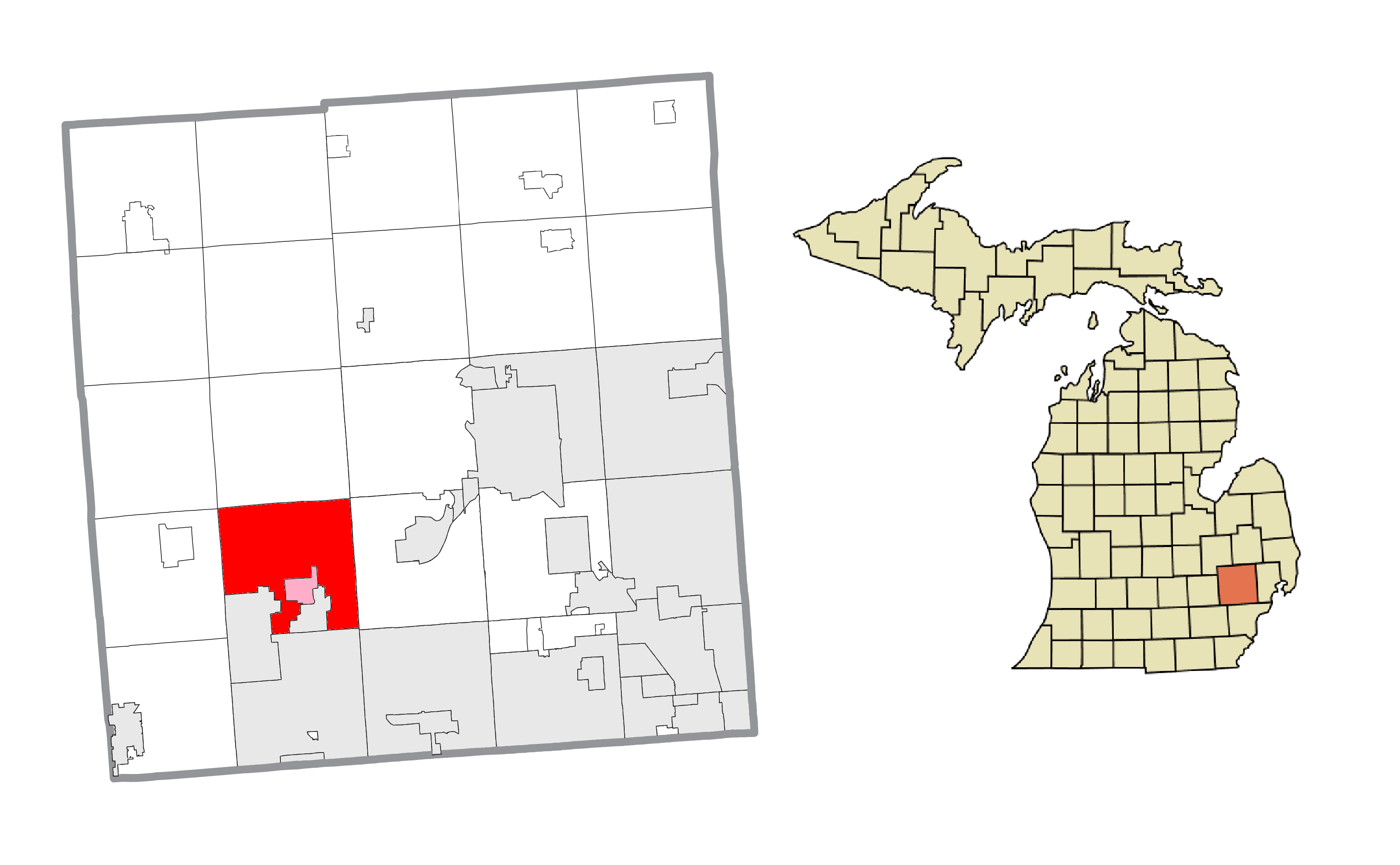
- Location within Oakland County (red) and the administered village of Wolverine Lake (pink)

- Location within the state of Michigan
- Coordinates: 42°34′46″N 83°29′16″W
- Country: United States
- State: Michigan
- County: Oakland

Government
  - Supervisor: Larry Gray
  - Clerk: Melissa Creech

Area
  - Charter township: 29.87 sq mi (77.4 km^{2})
  - Land: 27.50 sq mi (71.2 km^{2})
  - Water: 2.38 sq mi (6.2 km^{2})
- Elevation: 909 ft (277 m)

Population (2020)
  - Charter township: 43,054
  - Estimate (2025): 45,067
  - Density: 1,566/sq mi (604.5/km^{2})
  - Metro: 4,296,250 (Metro Detroit)
- Time zone: UTC-5 (Eastern (EST))
  - Summer (DST): UTC-4 (EDT)
- ZIP code(s): 48323 (West Bloomfield); 48382 (Commerce); 48390 (Walled Lake); 48393 (Wixom)
- Area code: 248
- FIPS code: 26-17640
- GNIS feature ID: 1626125
- Website: commercetwp.com

Commerce Township is a charter township in Oakland County in the U.S. state of Michigan. A northwestern suburb of Detroit, Commerce Township is located about 34 miles (54.7 km) northwest of downtown Detroit. As of the 2020 census, the township had a population of 43,058.

As a western suburb of Metro Detroit, Commerce Township is bordered by the cities of Walled Lake and Wixom to the south, and the township contains the village of Wolverine Lake. Originally settled as a resort destination, the township has seen a large population increase of permanent residents due to the townships rural environment and recreation areas, including most of Proud Lake State Recreation Area. The Huron River runs mostly north–south through the township, and the township also contains numerous lakes.

== History ==
The area of the future Commerce Township saw its first settler, Abram Walrod, arrive in May 1824. Sufficient population growth meant that the original Novi Township was quartered in size by the organization of Commerce Township and Lyon Township for self-government on March 7, 1834, with Milford Township beginning separate supervision from Lyon Township in 1835.

== Geography ==
The northern terminus of M-5 is within Commerce Township. This highway was originally meant to connect the spur route Interstate 275 back to Interstate 75, but the project was canceled due to the difficulty of construction around the township's numerous lakes, as well as the high property value of the area.

== Communities ==
- Commerce is located at Commerce and Sleeth Roads (42°35′28″N 83°29′27″W; Elevation: 945 ft./288 m.). The community of Commerce Village was platted in 1836.
- Glengary is located on Benstein Road between Oakley Park and Glengary Roads (42°33′54″N 83°30′15″W; Elevation: 922 ft./281 m.).
- Oakley Park is located on (42°34′08″N 83°29′48″W; Elevation: 932 ft./284 m.).
- Union Lake is an unincorporated community in the northeastern part of the township, adjoining the townships of West Bloomfield, Waterford, and White Lake.
- Wolverine Lake is an incorporated village in the township.

== Geography ==
According to the United States Census Bureau, the township has a total area of 29.90 square miles (77.44 km^{2}), of which 27.45 square miles (71.10 km^{2}) is land and 2.45 square miles (6.35 km^{2}) (8.19%) is water.

== Government ==
=== Federal, state, and county legislators ===
United States House of Representatives
District	Representative	Party	Since
11th	Haley Stevens	Democratic	2019

Michigan Senate
District	Senator	Party	Since
13th	Rosemary Bayer	Democratic	2023
23rd	Jim Runestad	Republican	2019 (Note: Runestad has represented all or part of Novi since 2019, but has only represented the 23rd district since 2023.)

Michigan House of Representatives
District	Representative	Party	Since
20th	Noah Arbit	Democratic	2023
49th	Ann Bollin	Republican	2023
51st	Matt Maddock	Republican	2023

Oakland County Board of Commissioners
District	Commissioner	Party	Since
12	Christine Long	Republican	2003
14	Ajay Raman	Democratic	2023

== Demographics ==
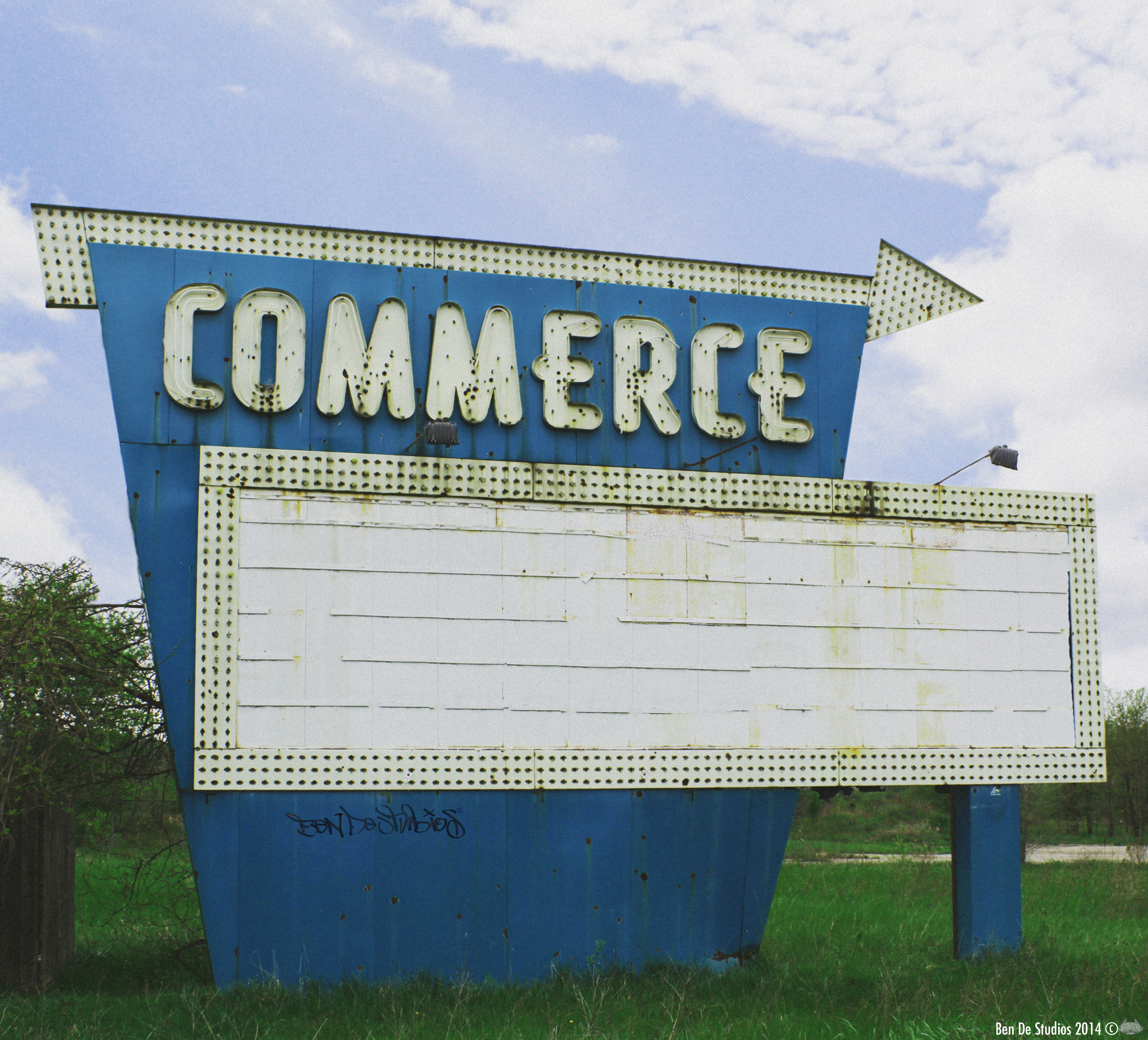
Commerce Township Drive In Landmark

As of the census of 2000, there were 34,764 people, 12,379 households, and 9,754 families residing in the township. The population density was 1,261.1 inhabitants per square mile (486.9/km^{2}). There were 12,924 housing units at an average density of 468.8 per square mile (181.0/km^{2}). The racial makeup of the township was 96.73% White, 0.50% African American, 0.19% Native American, 1.31% Asian, 0.01% Pacific Islander, 0.32% from other races, and 0.95% from two or more races. Hispanic or Latino of any race were 1.16% of the population.

There were 12,379 households, out of which 42.4% had children under the age of 18 living with them, 68.4% were married couples living together, 7.3% had a female householder with no husband present, and 21.2% were non-families. 17.0% of all households were made up of individuals, and 4.3% had someone living alone who was 65 years of age or older. The average household size was 2.81 and the average family size was 3.19.

In the township the population was spread out, with 29.5% under the age of 18, 5.6% from 18 to 24, 34.1% from 25 to 44, 23.7% from 45 to 64, and 7.1% who were 65 years of age or older. The median age was 36 years. For every 100 females, there were 101.4 males. For every 100 females age 18 and over, there were 99.0 males.

The median income for a household in the township was $72,702, and the median income for a family was $79,976. Males had a median income of $61,087 versus $36,125 for females. The per capita income for the township was $33,104. About 2.4% of families and 3.4% of the population were below the poverty line, including 3.8% of those under age 18 and 4.4% of those age 65 or over.

== Education ==
The two school districts within the boundaries of Commerce Township are Walled Lake Consolidated Schools and Huron Valley Schools. Walled Lake Northern, Walled Lake Central and Walled Lake Western High Schools are all located within the township.

Catholic schools are under the Roman Catholic Archdiocese of Detroit. St. William Catholic Church, which includes a portion of Commerce Township in its service area, operates St. William Catholic School, a K-8 school in Walled Lake.

== Religion ==
St. William Church in Walled Lake includes a portion of Commerce Township in its service area.

== Notable people ==
- David Hahn, 17-year-old Eagle Scout, constructed a makeshift nuclear reactor in his backyard in Commerce Township
- Connor Hellebuyck, ice hockey goaltender and Olympic gold medalist
- Alina Morse, inventor, entrepreneur, CEO and founder of Zollicandy
- William John McConnell, third governor of Idaho, senator in the Idaho State Senate
- Connor Rutz, forward for Detroit City FC in the USL Championship
- Callie Shanahan, professional ice hockey goaltender in the PWHL
- Anna Segedi, professional ice hockey player in the PWHL
