= Walled Lake Consolidated Schools =

School district in Michigan

Address
- 850 Ladd Rd Building D Walled Lake, Oakland, Michigan, 48390
- Coordinates: 42°32′06.4″N 83°29′24.1″W

District information
- Type: Public
- Motto: Every Child, Every Day
- Grades: PK–12
- Established: 1922
- Superintendent: Dr. Michael Lonze
- Budget: $269,512,000 2022-2023 expenditures
- NCES District ID: 2635160

Students and staff
- Students: 11,818 (2024-2025)
- Faculty: 695.31 (on an FTE basis) (2024-2025)
- Staff: 1,887.62 FTE (2024-2025)
- Student–teacher ratio: 17.0 (2024-2025)
- Athletic conference: Lakes Valley Conference
- Colors: Blue & White

Other information
- Number of Schools: 20
- Website: www.wlcsd.org

The Walled Lake Consolidated School District is a public school district in Metro Detroit in the U.S. state of Michigan, serving Walled Lake, Wixom, Wolverine Lake, and portions of Commerce Township, Novi, Farmington Hills, Orchard Lake Village, West Bloomfield, and White Lake Township.

== History ==
Walled Lake Consolidated School was built in 1922 at 615 North Pontiac Trail, and included all grades and a high school. The school housed about 200 students from the 52 square mile district. In the late 1940s, enough elementary schools had been built in the district to allow the Consolidated School to become a junior/senior high school. A new senior high school was built in 1954 and the original building became a junior high. The Dublin School District was annexed by the district in 1967, leading to the construction of Walled Lake Western High School in 1969. Walled Lake Northern High School was dedicated in 2003.

In 2010 the district reported having a potential deficit of $22.7 million for the 2010–2011 school year. The district proposed a deficit reduction plan which proposed privatizing transportation and custodial services and laying off 300 district employees, including teachers.

The original Consolidated School had become the Community Education Center in 1992. In 2017, the school board voted to close the Community Education Center due to increased costs and decreased funding from the state. The district at the time was also completing the Safety, Security and Technology Bond, that was approved by voters in 2014. When it became time to renovate the Community Education Center, it was determined that due to the age and functions of the building, it would not be fiscally-responsible to complete the projects for that building. The City of Walled Lake filed a lawsuit against the school district to prevent it from being demolished, which the district had gone out to bid for. City officials cited that the building is a historic landmark in the city. In spite of this, demolition of the Community Education Center was completed in late 2018.

== Schools ==
Schools in Walled Lake Consolidated Schools district
School	Address	Notes
High schools
Walled Lake Central High School	1600 Oakley Park Road, Walled Lake	Built 1954.
Walled Lake Northern High School	6000 Bogie Lake Road, Commerce Township	Built 2003.
Walled Lake Western High School	600 Beck Road, Walled Lake	Built 1969.
Middle schools
Clifford Smart Middle School	8500 Commerce Road, Commerce Township	
Sarah Banks Middle School	1760 Charms Road, Wixom	
Walnut Creek Middle School	7601 Walnut Lake Road, West Bloomfield Township	
Elementary schools
Commerce Elementary School	520 Farr Street, Commerce Township	
Dublin Elementary School	425 Farnsworth Road, White Lake Township	Opened fall 2022.
Glengary Elementary School	3070 Woodbury Street, Walled Lake	
Mary Helen Guest Elementary School	1655 Decker Road, Walled Lake	
Hickory Woods Elementary School	30655 Novi Road, Novi	Opened fall 1991.
Keith Elementary School	2800 Keith Road, West Bloomfield Township	
Loon Lake Elementary School	2151 Loon Lake Road, Wixom	
Meadowbrook Elementary School	29200 Meadowbrook Road, Novi	
Oakley Park Elementary School	2015 Oakley Park Road, Walled Lake	
Pleasant Lake Elementary School	4900 Halsted Road, West Bloomfield Township	
Wixom Elementary School	301 North Wixom Road, Wixom	New building planned for fall 2027 opening.
Early childhood centers
Twin Sun Early Childhood Center	850 Ladd Road Building D, Walled Lake	
Dublin Early Childhood Wing	425 Farnsworth Road, White Lake Township	
Walled Lake Early Childhood Center	40839 Thirteen Mile Road, Novi	

=== Defunct schools ===
- Community Education Center (Walled Lake)
- James R. Geisler Middle School (Commerce Township)
- Maple Elementary (West Bloomfield)
- Twin Beach Elementary School (West Bloomfield)
- Union Lake Elementary School (Commerce Township)
