= Walled Lake, Michigan =

- City
- City of Walled Lake
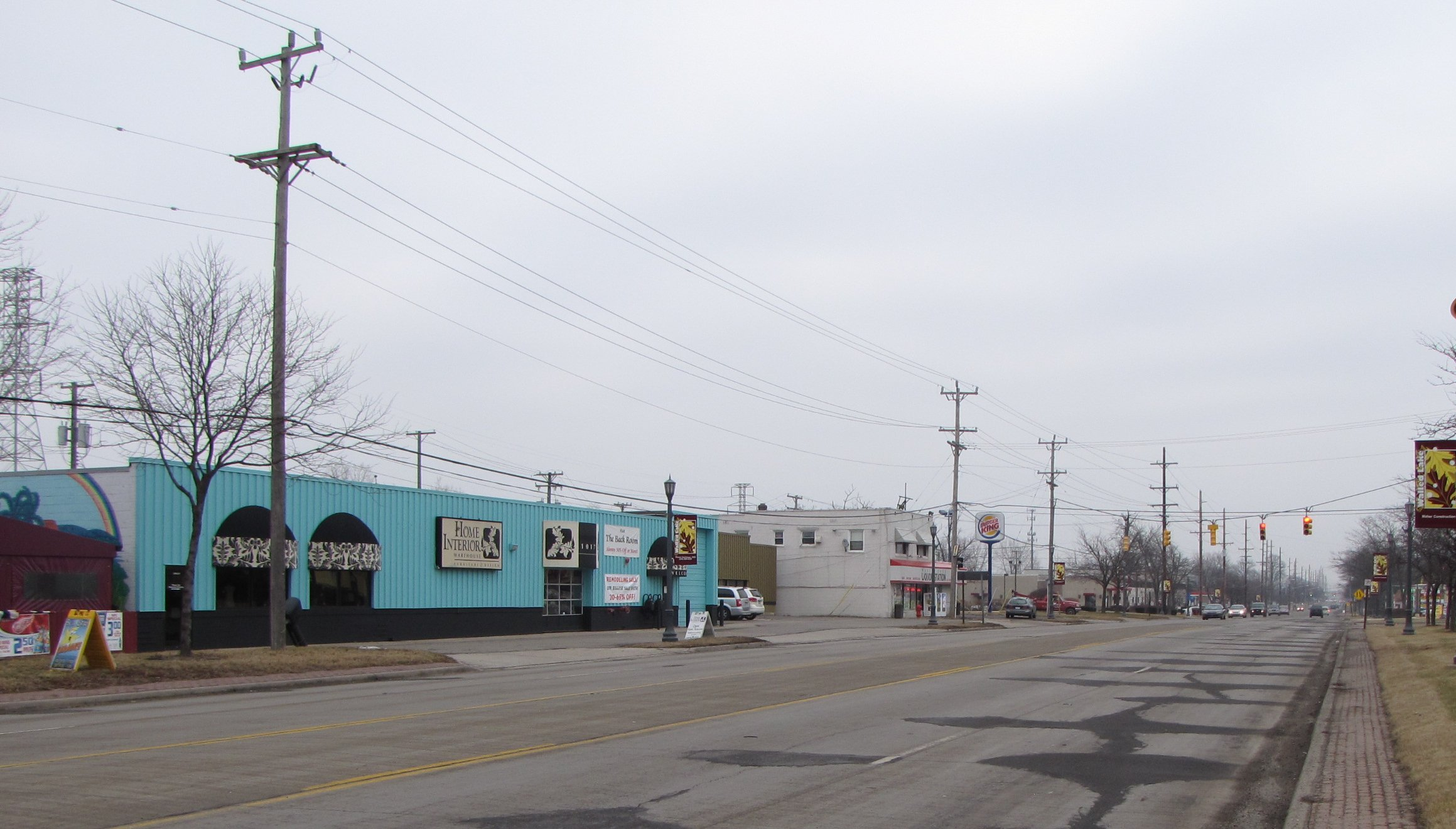
- Facing east along East Maple Road

- Seal

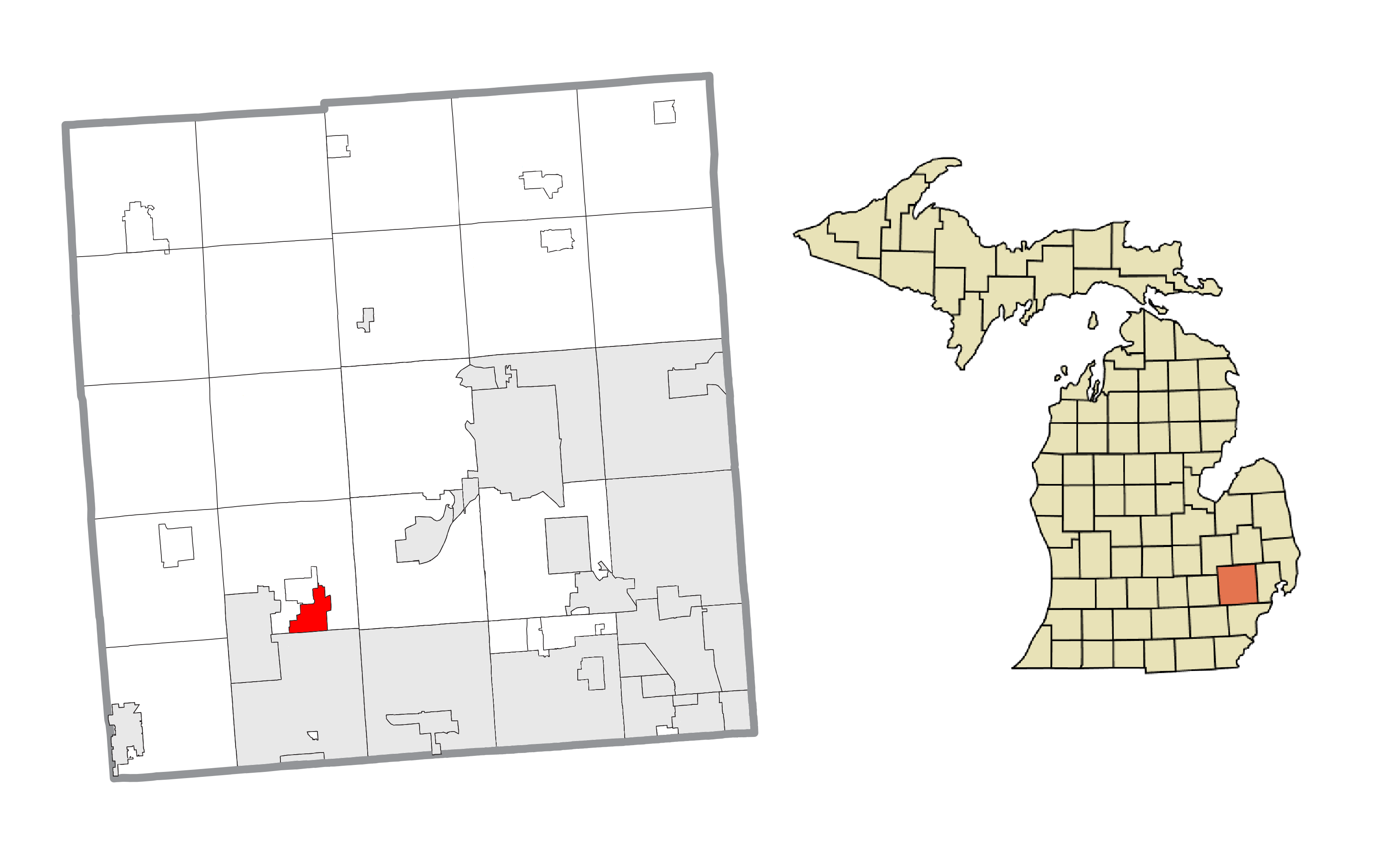
- Location within Oakland County

- Location within the state of Michigan
- Coordinates: 42°32′16″N 83°28′52″W
- Country: United States
- State: Michigan
- County: Oakland
- Incorporated: 1954

Government
  - Type: Mayor–council
  - Mayor: Richard Gunther
  - Clerk: Jennifer Stuart
  - Manager: L. Dennis Whitt

Area
  - City: 2.39 sq mi (6.19 km^{2})
  - Land: 2.21 sq mi (5.72 km^{2})
  - Water: 0.18 sq mi (0.47 km^{2})
- Elevation: 942 ft (287 m)

Population (2020)
  - City: 7,250
  - Density: 3,282.8/sq mi (1,267.48/km^{2})
  - Metro: 4,296,250 (Metro Detroit)
- Time zone: UTC-5 (Eastern (EST))
  - Summer (DST): UTC-4 (EDT)
- ZIP code(s): 48390, 48391
- Area code: 248
- FIPS code: 26-83060
- GNIS feature ID: 1615720
- Website: Official website

Walled Lake is a city in Oakland County in the U.S. state of Michigan. A northwestern suburb of Detroit, Walled Lake is located roughly 32 miles (51.5 km) northwest of downtown Detroit. As of the 2020 census, the city had a population of 7,246.

== History ==
The town's name is said to have been given by the first American settler, Walter Hewitt, in 1825. Upon his arrival, he noticed what appeared to be a stone wall along the western bank of a nearby lake, possibly constructed by earlier Potawatomi Indian tribes.

Walled Lake was a village inhabited by Ojibwa and Potowatamie people until about 1830. It appears that these people had relocated from an earlier village in the area that is today Southfield.

Resting spots along the Underground Railroad, where runaway slaves could sleep and eat, were called "depots". One of these was the Foster Farmhouse (built in 1833) in Walled Lake, which served as a refuge for those making their way to freedom in Canada. The Foster Farmhouse was located on Pontiac Trail near West Maple road until 1997, when it was moved to Riley Park in downtown Walled Lake to avoid demolition. the house was originally home to Sarah Gertrude Banks, who was a doctor at the University of Michigan.

In the 1920s Herman Chankush ordered the Walled Lake Amusement Park to be built. He died in 1928, but the park finally opened on Memorial Day of 1929. It ran for 39 years until competition with Edgewater Park and Boblo Island led to its closure in 1968.

In 1923 the Walled Lake Dance Casino was opened. Many famous acts played at the casino over the years, including a young Stevie Wonder. On Christmas Day of 1965 the casino burned down, apparently due to an errant cigarette thrown into a wooden trashcan. Since the entire casino was made of wood, it burned very quickly, and although neighboring communities' fire departments came to battle the blaze, it was no use. Both the casino and the amusement park were located at the intersection of what is now 13 Mile and Southlake Drive. That property is now known as Pavilion Shore Park.

In September 2022, a QAnon adherent and local resident shot multiple members of his family before being killed by police.

== Geography ==
According to the United States Census Bureau, the city has a total area of 2.37 square miles (6.14 km^{2}), of which 2.18 square miles (5.65 km^{2}) is land and 0.19 square miles (0.49 km^{2}) is water.

Walled Lake is north of the City of Novi and east of the City of Wixom.

== Demographics ==
Historical population
Census	Pop.	Note	%±
1960	3,550		—
1970	3,759		5.9%
1980	4,748		26.3%
1990	6,278		32.2%
2000	6,713		6.9%
2010	6,999		4.3%
2020	7,250		3.6%
U.S. Decennial Census

=== 2020 census ===
As of the 2020 census, Walled Lake had a population of 7,250. The median age was 43.1 years. 16.5% of residents were under the age of 18 and 18.8% of residents were 65 years of age or older. For every 100 females there were 91.3 males, and for every 100 females age 18 and over there were 88.1 males age 18 and over.

100.0% of residents lived in urban areas, while 0.0% lived in rural areas.

There were 3,571 households in Walled Lake, of which 20.8% had children under the age of 18 living in them. Of all households, 32.1% were married-couple households, 25.0% were households with a male householder and no spouse or partner present, and 35.5% were households with a female householder and no spouse or partner present. About 42.4% of all households were made up of individuals and 15.9% had someone living alone who was 65 years of age or older.

There were 3,730 housing units, of which 4.3% were vacant. The homeowner vacancy rate was 1.0% and the rental vacancy rate was 3.7%.

Racial composition as of the 2020 census
Race	Number	Percent
White	5,839	80.5%
Black or African American	489	6.7%
American Indian and Alaska Native	22	0.3%
Asian	298	4.1%
Native Hawaiian and Other Pacific Islander	4	0.1%
Some other race	113	1.6%
Two or more races	485	6.7%
Hispanic or Latino (of any race)	346	4.8%

=== 2010 census ===
As of the census of 2010, there were 6,999 people, 3,347 households, and 1,771 families living in the city. The population density was 3,210.6 inhabitants per square mile (1,239.6/km^{2}). There were 3,689 housing units at an average density of 1,692.2 per square mile (653.4/km^{2}). The racial makeup of the city was 88.7% White, 4.4% African American, 0.4% Native American, 2.8% Asian, 1.1% from other races, and 2.5% from two or more races. Hispanic or Latino of any race were 3.9% of the population.

There were 3,347 households, of which 25.4% had children under the age of 18 living with them, 34.4% were married couples living together, 13.7% had a female householder with no husband present, 4.8% had a male householder with no wife present, and 47.1% were non-families. 39.7% of all households were made up of individuals, and 12.8% had someone living alone who was 65 years of age or older. The average household size was 2.09 and the average family size was 2.82.

The median age in the city was 39.4 years. 19.9% of residents were under the age of 18; 8% were between the ages of 18 and 24; 30.2% were from 25 to 44; 28.2% were from 45 to 64; and 13.8% were 65 years of age or older. The gender makeup of the city was 46.6% male and 53.4% female.

=== 2000 census ===
As of the census of 2000, there were 6,713 people, 3,158 households, and 1,689 families living in the city. The population density was 2,956.9 inhabitants per square mile (1,141.7/km^{2}). There were 3,390 housing units at an average density of 1,493.2 per square mile (576.5/km^{2}). The racial makeup of the city was 95.34% White, 0.73% African American, 0.31% Native American, 1.70% Asian, 0.49% from other races, and 1.43% from two or more races. Hispanic or Latino of any race were 1.68% of the population.

There were 3,158 households, out of which 26.2% had children under the age of 18 living with them, 39.0% were married couples living together, 11.5% had a female householder with no husband present, and 46.5% were non-families. 39.8% of all households were made up of individuals, and 12.4% had someone living alone who was 65 years of age or older. The average household size was 2.12 and the average family size was 2.88.

In the city, the population was spread out, with 21.3% under the age of 18, 7.4% from 18 to 24, 36.8% from 25 to 44, 22.5% from 45 to 64, and 12.0% who were 65 years of age or older. The median age was 37 years. For every 100 females, there were 85.7 males. For every 100 females age 18 and over, there were 81.1 males.

The median income for a household in the city was $45,386, and the median income for a family was $55,420. Males had a median income of $45,420 versus $31,021 for females. The per capita income for the city was $24,199. About 2.9% of families and 5.0% of the population were below the poverty line, including 5.9% of those under age 18 and 5.1% of those age 65 or over.

== Government ==
=== Mayor ===
The mayor of Walled Lake is Linda Ackley.

=== City Council ===
The Council consists of seven members, including the mayor and a mayor pro tem, elected to four-year terms. Besides the mayor, current council members include: Casey R. Ambrose, Mindy Fernandes, Tamra Loch, Bennett Lublin, and John Owsinek. Mayor Pro Tem is Ryan Woods.

=== Federal, state, and county legislators ===
United States House of Representatives
District	Representative	Party	Since
11th	Haley Stevens	Democratic	2019

Michigan Senate
District	Senator	Party	Since
13th	Rosemary Bayer	Democratic	2023

Michigan House of Representatives
District	Representative	Party	Since
49th	Ann Bollin	Republican	2023

Oakland County Board of Commissioners
District	Commissioner	Party	Since
14th	Ajay Raman	Democratic	2023

=== Police services ===
In February 2007 Walled Lake and Wolverine Lake agreed to share police services; Walled Lake took responsibility for dispatch services, and all police operations in Wolverine Lake were moved to Walled Lake. Since then Wolverine Lake has separated, having its own police station once again.

== Education ==
The Walled Lake Consolidated Schools serves Walled Lake and has its district headquarters, the Educational Service Center, in the city. The district's Community Education Center is also in Walled Lake.

The schools within the city limits are Mary Helen Guest Elementary School and Walled Lake Elementary School. Most of the city is zoned to these schools. Portions are zoned to Meadowbrook Elementary School and Hickory Woods Elementary School.

Portions are zoned to James R. Geisler Middle School, and portions are zoned to Sarah Banks Middle School. Most of Walled Lake is zoned to Walled Lake Western High School, while a portion of Walled Lake is zoned to Walled Lake Central High School.

Roman Catholic schools are under the Roman Catholic Archdiocese of Detroit. St. William Catholic School (K–8) is in Walled Lake.

== Religion ==
St. William Church in Walled Lake includes Walled Lake in its service area.
