= Walled Lake Northern High School =

High school in Commerce Township, Oakland County, Michigan

Location
- 6000 Bogie Lake Road; Commerce Township, Michigan; United States; 42.61°N 83.5°W

Information
- Type: Public High School
- Established: 2002
- School district: Walled Lake Consolidated Schools
- Principal: Gregory Diamond
- Teaching staff: 66.70 (FTE)
- Grades: 9-12
- Enrollment: 1,457 (2023–2024)
- Student to teacher ratio: 21.84
- Campus: Suburban
- Colors: Maroon, silver and black
- Mascot: Knights
- Rivals: Walled Lake Central; Walled Lake Western
- Accreditation: North Central Association of Colleges and Schools
- Feeder schools: C H Smart Middle School
- Affiliation: Kensington Lakes Activities Association
- Website: northern.wlcsd.org

Student assessments
- 2021–22 school year Change vs. prior year

M-STEP 11th grade proficiency rates (Science / Social Studies)
- Advanced %: 15.1 / 15.7
- Proficient %: 28.4 / 28.9
- PR. Proficient %: 16.5 / 38.4
- Not Proficient %: 40.0 / 17.0

Average test scores
- SAT Total: 1020.2 (▼ −76.2)

Walled Lake Northern High School (WLN) is an American public high school in the Walled Lake Consolidated School District, located in Commerce Township, Michigan, in Greater Detroit. It was completed in April 2003 by TMP Associates, Inc. at a cost of $67.5 million. The school serves 1,612 students.

== About ==
The school contains academic, athletic, technological, and performing arts facilities. The academic wings of the school surround the Media Center, and follow a loop pattern. The school has a main gym, an auxiliary gym, an indoor swimming pool, and an upstairs indoor track. The football field contains a home grandstand, two concession stands, and a Fieldturf football field. The track is a full quarter-mile and is set parallel from the football field. In addition, there are tennis courts, a lacrosse field, four baseball fields, and a full practice football field.

The fine and performing arts wing of the school contains two computer labs (one CAD), two art rooms, and a technology lab. One of the art rooms contains a kiln and a dark room. The band, orchestra, and choir rooms have full sound systems, projector screens, and full acoustic design implemented in the ceilings and walls. The auditorium seats approximately one thousand people and includes a second story balcony for additional seating. As of 2011, its mascot officially became a Jolly Knight. Before then, the school alternated between using images of a Jolly Knight and a chess knight for its mascot imagery.

== History ==
When Walled Lake Northern opened in August 2002, only one half of the school was accessible to students. The gym, pool, auditorium, and fine arts wing were still under construction throughout the 2002–03 school year.

== Notable alumni ==
- Connor Hellebuyck - ice hockey goaltender for the Winnipeg Jets; Mike Richter Award, Vezina Trophy, and Hart Memorial Trophy winner
- Connor Rutz - professional soccer player.
