= Walled Lake Western High School =

High school in Michigan, United States

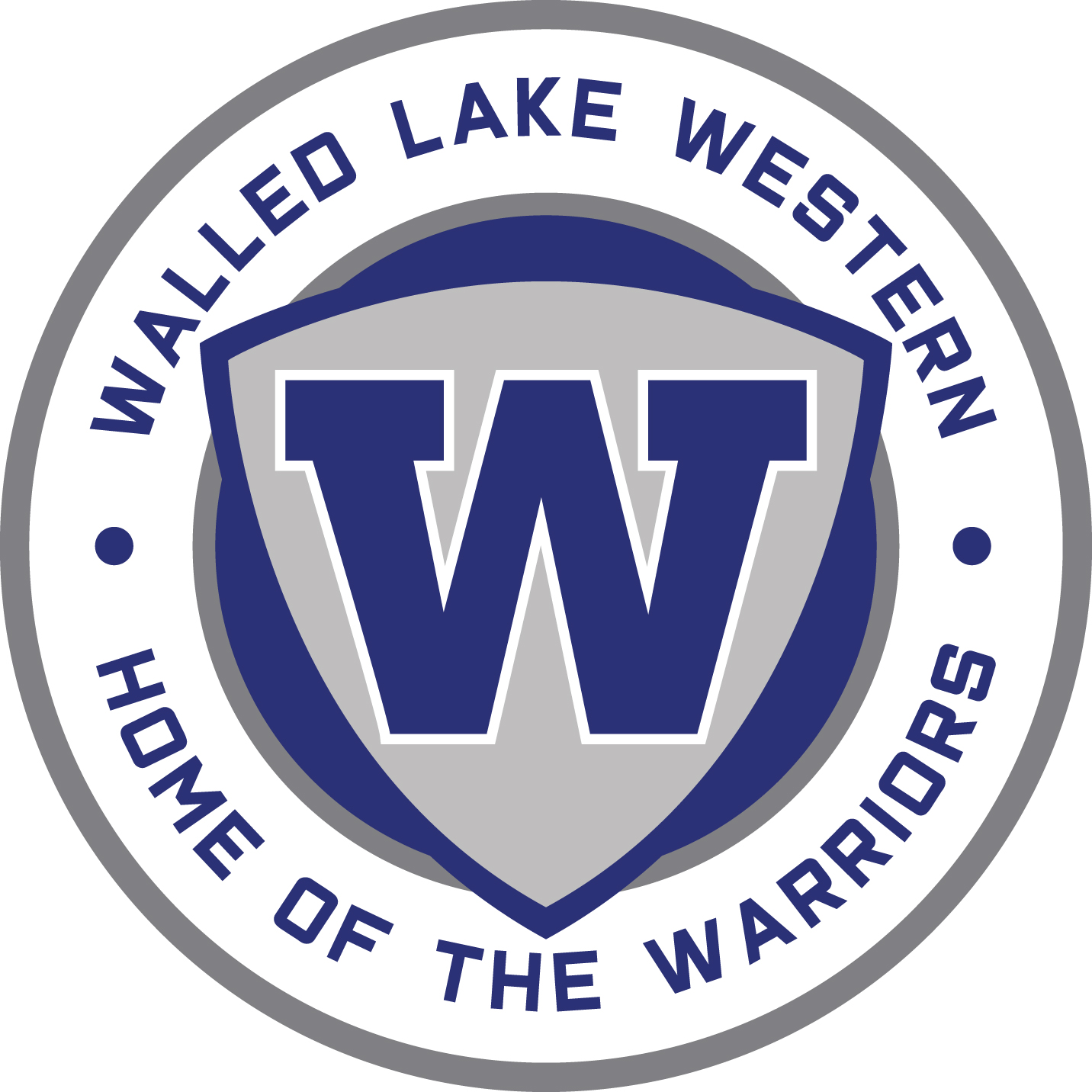

Location
- 600 Beck Road; Walled Lake, Michigan 48390; United States; 42°31′48″N 83°30′57″W

Information
- Type: Public High School
- Motto: Academic Excellence for a Global Society
- Established: August, 1969
- School district: Walled Lake Consolidated Schools
- Principal: Amy Pashak
- Teaching staff: 58.50 (FTE)
- Grades: 9–12
- Enrollment: 1,049 (2023–2024)
- Student to teacher ratio: 17.93
- Campus: Suburban
- Colors: Blue and silver
- Athletics conference: Lakes Valley Conference
- Nickname: Warriors
- Rivals: Walled Lake Central; Walled Lake Northern
- Accreditation: North Central Association of Colleges and Schools
- Feeder schools: James R Geisler Middle School; Sarah Banks Middle School; Walnut Creek Middle School
- Website: western.wlcsd.org

Student assessments
- 2021–22 school year Change vs. prior year

M-STEP 11th grade proficiency rates (Science / Social Studies)
- Advanced %: 12.2 / 9.5
- Proficient %: 26.8 / 27.1
- PR. Proficient %: 16.9 / 44.1
- Not Proficient %: 44.1 / 19.3

Average test scores
- SAT Total: 997.9 (▼ −80.5)

Walled Lake Western High School (also known as "Walled Lake Western," "Western," or "WLW"), is a public high school of the Walled Lake Consolidated School District, located in Commerce Township, Michigan in Greater Detroit. The school serves portions of the township, most of Walled Lake, most of Wixom and portions of Novi.

== History ==
Opened in 1969, Walled Lake Western was the second high school in Walled Lake. Western's mascot is the Warriors, and the school colors are Royal Blue and Silver (Scarlet was integrated as a school color from 1983 to 2004). Kirsten Haglund, who graduated in 2006, was named Miss America 2008. The International Baccalaureate program started in the 2012–2013 school year for grades 11 and 12, eventually being cancelled following the 2025-2026 school year.

== Academics ==
In 2009, Walled Lake Western High School was ranked in the top 5% of all schools in the nation by Newsweek magazine. The ranking is calculated by the "number of Advanced Placement, International Baccalaureate and/or Cambridge tests taken by all students at a school in 2008 divided by the number of graduating seniors." Beginning in the fall of 2013, Western will begin the International Baccalaureate Diploma program for 11th and 12th grade students as an alternative to AP Testing.

== Athletics ==
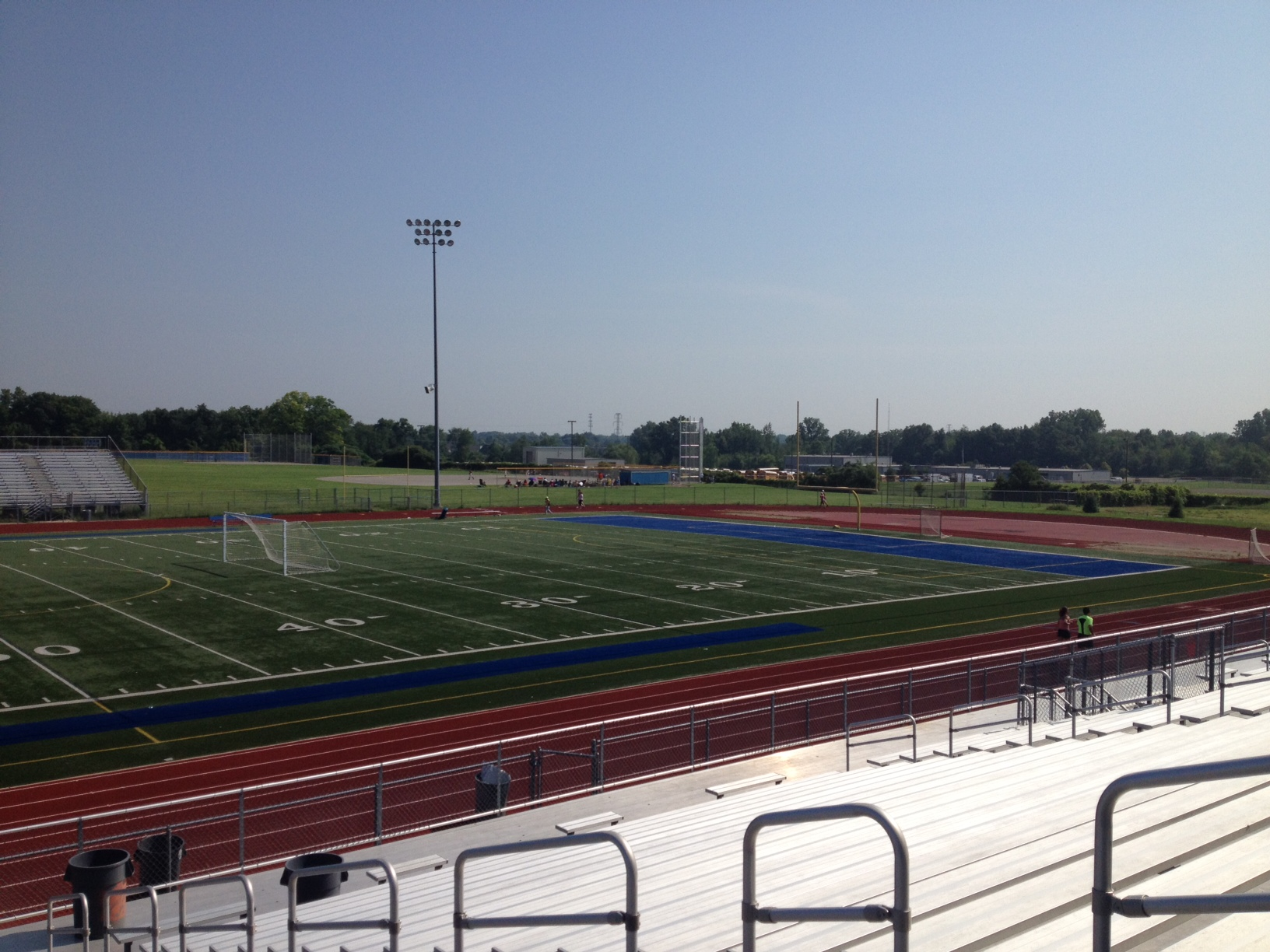
Warrior Stadium in the summertime.

Western used to belong to the Kensington Lakes Activities Association. In 1984, the Warriors baseball team captured the school's first state championship. The football team won the state title in 1996, and again in 1999 (USA Today 11th ranked in country). Western was also a State finalist in 1992 and 2016. The Warriors are 35-time Walled Lake City Champions. Western's football team has made the playoffs 26 times and is currently on its 14th year straight. Their field is known as Warrior Stadium due to the school's nickname.

== Notable alumni ==
- David Booth – former NHL player
- Craig DeRoche – former Speaker of the Michigan House of Representatives
- Kirsten Haglund – Miss Michigan 2007 and Miss America 2008
- Josh Jones – NFL player for the Seattle Seahawks
- Matt Koleszar – Michigan State Representative
- Cam Vieaux - baseball player
- Cody White - NFL player for the Seattle Seahawks
- Randy Huntington Track and Field Coach - Coach of Mike Powell and Willie Banks - World Record Holders - Assistant Coach MSU -2005-2006 - Head Coach for Chinese National/Olympic team 2013-2022 - Su Bingtian - Wang Chunyu - Wang Jianan
