= Walled Lake (Michigan) =

Lake in Oakland County, Michigan, United States

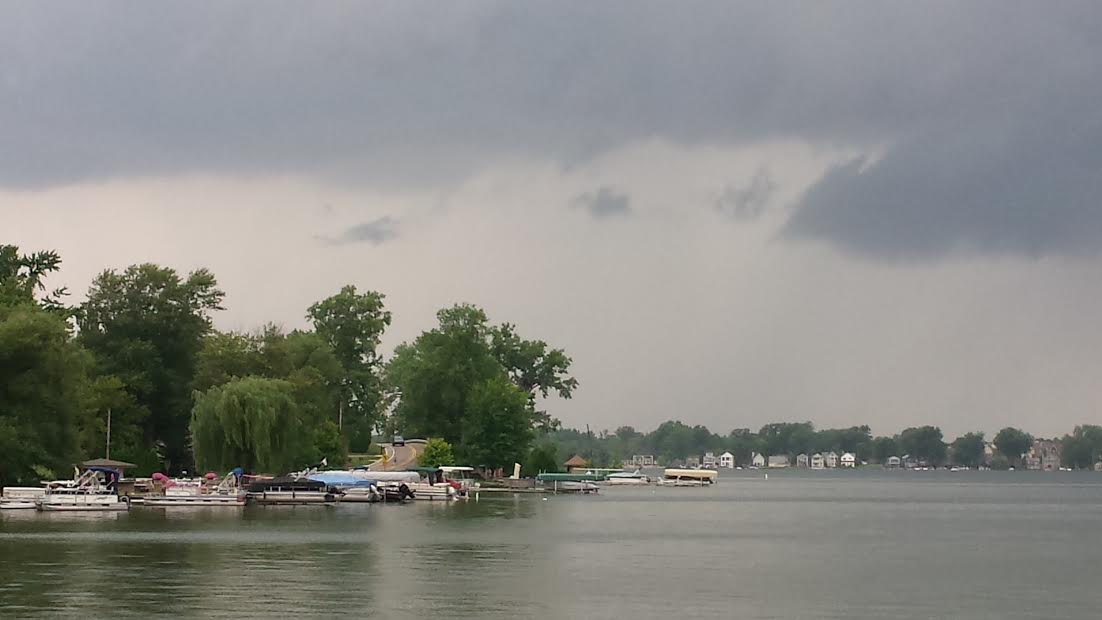

- Location within Michigan Location within the United States
- Location: Oakland County, Michigan
- Coordinates: 42°31′14″N 83°28′54″W
- Type: Kettle / Glacial
- Basin countries: United States
- Surface area: 670 acres (270 ha)
- Max. depth: 53 ft (16 m)
- Surface elevation: 932 ft (284 m)
- Settlements: Walled Lake

Walled Lake is the fourth largest lake in Oakland County, Michigan, United States, and is located in Walled Lake and Novi, Michigan in southeastern Michigan.

The depth of Walled Lake reaches 53 feet (16 m). The lake bottom is primarily composed of sand or marl in the shallower areas and pulpy peat in the deeper parts. The lake outlets to the Middle Rouge River via the Walled Lake Branch (formerly Beaver Creek).

== See also ==
- List of lakes in Michigan
