= Wixom, Michigan =

- City
- City of Wixom
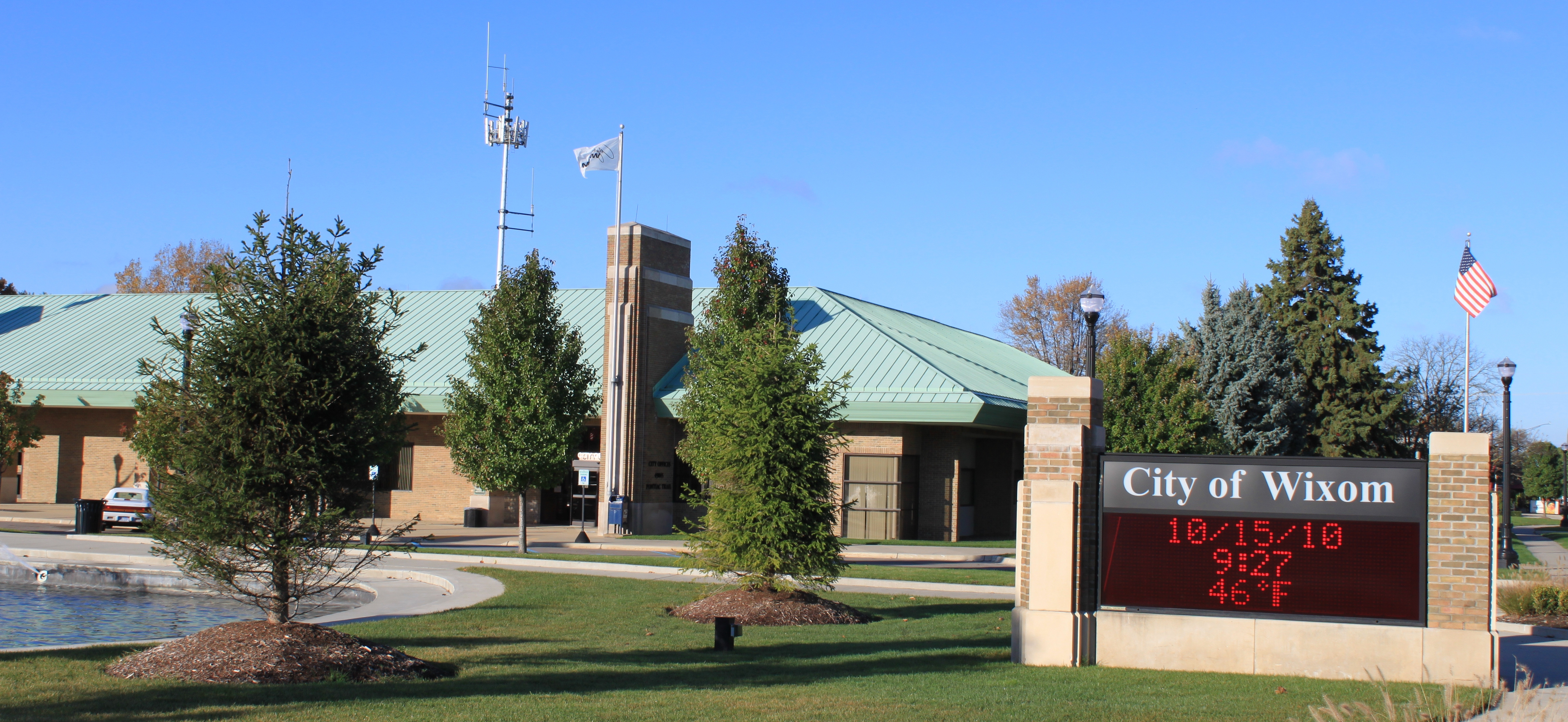
- Wixom City Offices along Pontiac Trail

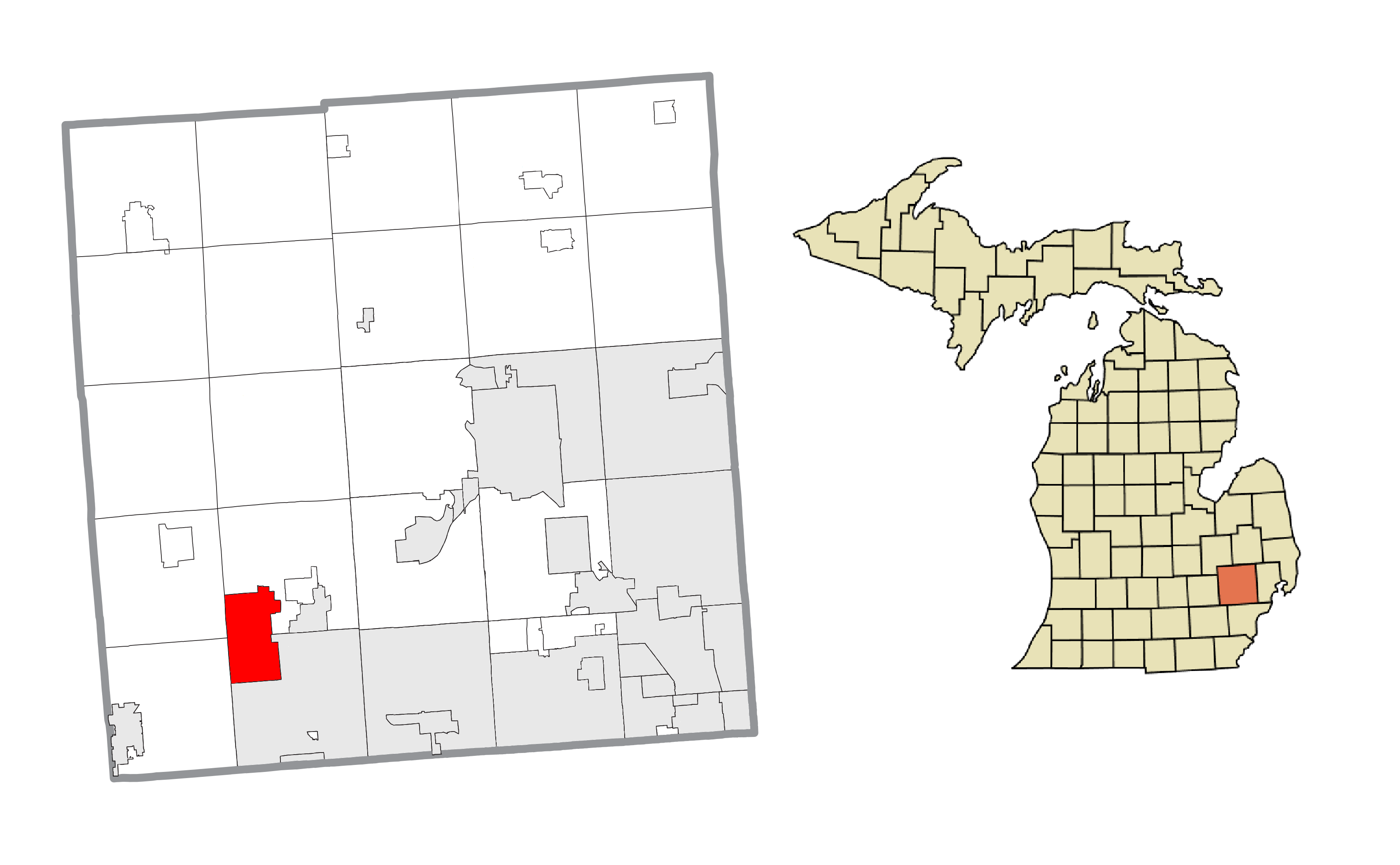
- Location within Oakland County

- Location within the state of Michigan
- Coordinates: 42°31′29″N 83°32′11″W
- Country: United States
- State: Michigan
- County: Oakland
- Settled: 1831
- Platted: 1871
- Incorporated: 1957 (village); 1958 (city)

Government
  - Type: Mayor–council
  - Mayor: Patrick Beagle
  - Manager: Steven Brown

Area
  - City: 9.36 sq mi (24.23 km^{2})
  - Land: 9.14 sq mi (23.67 km^{2})
  - Water: 0.22 sq mi (0.57 km^{2})
- Elevation: 928 ft (283 m)

Population (2020)
  - City: 17,193
  - Density: 1,881.5/sq mi (726.47/km^{2})
  - Metro: 4,296,250 (Metro Detroit)
- Time zone: UTC−5 (EST)
  - Summer (DST): UTC−4 (EDT)
- ZIP code(s): 48393
- Area code: 248
- FIPS code: 26-88140
- GNIS ID: 1616671
- Website: Official website

Wixom (/ˈwɪksəm/ WIK-səm) is a city in Oakland County in the U.S. state of Michigan. A northwestern suburb of Detroit, Wixom is located roughly 30 miles (48.3 km) from downtown Detroit. As of the 2020 census, the city's population was 17,193.

The city was home to the now-demolished Wixom Assembly Plant, which operated from 1957–2007. The city is also home to several production and manufacturing businesses, including Trijicon, Discraft, NGK, Rockwell Medical and Majic Window.

== History ==
The settlement of Wixom dates back to 1831. In the beginning, Wixom was named Sibley's Corners after the first settler, 20 year old philanthropist Alonzo Sibley. Sibley settled in what is today called Commerce Township, where he purchased approximately 80 acres of land. Over time, Sibley purchased about 350 more acres of land. In 1837 Sibley donated a portion of his property for a local cemetery; which was called South Commerce Burial Ground; however, was later changed to Wixom Cemetery. Sibley then became the president of the cemetery association.

The establishment of Wixom began in 1871 when Willard Clark Wixom (son of Ahijah C. Wixom and Lucy Clark) granted a right of way through his property for the Holly, Wayne and Monroe Railway. Willard platted land on both sides of the railroad near the Novi and Commerce Township border. In 1883, Willard opened his property up to become an important railroad junction for the Michigan Air Line Railway and the Grand Trunk Western Railroad. With the new junction, Willard located the railroad station, union depot (called Wixom Station) and mail drop at the intersection of his property. The construction of the railroad junction attracted many new business investments, stores, a lumber yard, and a cider mill, ultimately turning the small village into Michigan's largest grain produce handling point. The name of the town was then changed from Sibley's Corners to Wixom. On December 24, 1901, Willard was struck and killed by a passenger train while crossing the tracks in his horse and buggy.

Wixom was incorporated as a village in 1957 following the announcement of plans to construct the Wixom Assembly Plant in Novi Township. Prior to that time, Wixom was an unincorporated place. The village borders included portions of both Novi and Commerce Townships. Efforts by the remainder of Novi Township to incorporate as a village prompted the newly established village of Wixom to incorporate as a city, which was finalized in 1958. The city largely follows the borders of the village although a small area of parkland on the north side of the city was annexed from Commerce Township in the 1970s.

On November 14, 1996, Gerald Atkins "shot his way" into the Ford Wixom Assembly Plant with a CAR-15 semi-automatic rifle, eventually killing plant manufacturing manager Darrell Izzard (aged 57) in a hallway; the shooter wounded three others. Fleeing the plant, Atkins hid in storm drain tunnels while law enforcement surrounded the plant and trained their weapons from as far away as the Interstate 96 freeway. Hours later he surrendered.

== Government ==
=== Federal, state, and county legislators ===
United States House of Representatives
District	Representative	Party	Since
11th	Haley Stevens	Democratic	2019

Michigan Senate
District	Senator	Party	Since
23rd	Jim Runestad	Republican	2019 (Note: Runestad has represented Wixom since 2019, but has only represented the 23rd district since 2023.)

Michigan House of Representatives
District	Representative	Party	Since
49th	Ann Bollin	Republican	2023

Oakland County Board of Commissioners
District	Commissioner	Party	Since
14th	Ajay Raman	Democratic	2023

== Downtown Development ==
The downtown area of the city was developed with a new main street area on Pontiac Trail by the city offices called the Wixom Village Center. This was a $200 million project. The Village Center includes a pedestrian plaza, restaurants, and service shops. The residential development called Tribute of Wixom will contains 600 units that include ranch-style condos, town houses, and single-family homes. The project was postponed in 2008 and construction did not begin again until 2014.

=== Wixom Downtown Development Authority (DDA) ===
The DDA’s primary source of revenue is Tax Increment Financing (TIF). TIF capture occurs through the normal increase in property taxes over the base year the DDA was established, due to new investment (building of homes and businesses for example) and/or inflation. So, as property values rise in the DDA District over the base year, the DDA captures the increase in value and invests those funds back into the district.

==== Priorities of Focus 2024/2025 ====
1. Renton Area Redevelopment: The DDA, along with the City of Wixom, will focus on the redevelopment of City owned parcels.

2. Branding, Logo, and Wayfinding Signage: In conjunction with the City of Wixom, the DDA will be working with Guide Studios out of Cleveland, OH on the rebranding of Downtown Wixom/City of Wixom and creating a plan for wayfinding signage to be incorporated into the entire City of Wixom.

3. The Civic Center Playground: In partnership with the Parks & Rec Commission, and the Library Board, a new playground was constructed in 2024, with a budgeted investment from the Wixom DDA of $250,000.

4. West End Commons: The DDA is actively pursuing grant funding and other funding sources for the development of this area. Congressional funding: $738,400.00; OC ARPA Funding: $206,868.00; DDA Funding: $320,000.00.

=== Recent Projects ===
- West End Sidewalk Project: Sidewalk on the South side of Pontiac Trail between Wixom Road and Old Wixom Road was rebuilt and updated with new landscaping boxes in 2023.
- Construction of the Wixom Loop in coordination with the City of Wixom Parks & Recreation Department.
- Downtown Hanging Baskets: Annual installation of baskets takes place every year in May.
- The Junction Social District: This common area is designated within the downtown district where customers can enjoy their alcoholic beverages purchased from a participating bar or restaurant.

Over $460,000 back into downtown.

=== Future Projects ===
- Pontiac Trail Power Lines & Streetscape
- Wixom Loop - Trail Walk Activation
- Downtown Public Art Program
- Wixom Road Landscaping
- EV Charging Stations
- Expansion of downtown light posts & flower baskets
- DDA Events & Initiatives
- Wednesdays in Wixom - January/February
- Sip n Stroll - March, October
- Derby Day Races - May
- Block Party - September
- Spooktacular Downtown Treat Hunt - October
- Downtown Dazzle - November/December
- Candy Cane Lane - December

Contributed funding for: Concerts in the Park, Fireworks, Tree Lighting Festival, and other City sponsored downtown events.

Over $100,000 invested back into the community.

The Wixom DDA relies on its volunteers to help in many areas; events, committees, board positions, day-to-day operations, and more.

== Education ==
Most of Wixom is part of Walled Lake Consolidated Schools. The extreme southwest portion of the city is within the South Lyon Community School District. Additionally a small portion of southern Wixom is in the area of the Novi Community School District.

Schools located in the city limits include Loon Lake Elementary School, Wixom Elementary School, Sarah Banks Middle School, and Wixom Christian School. The Walled Lake district's Twin Sun Preschool is also in Wixom.

Walled Lake district elementary schools serving Wixom include Loon Lake, Wixom, Hickory Woods, and Walled Lake. Most of Wixom is zoned to Banks Middle School, with a small part zoned to Geisler Middle School. Most residents are zoned to Walled Lake Western High School. Some parts of the city are zoned to Walled Lake Central High School.

The portion in the South Lyon district is zoned to Dolsen Elementary School, Centennial Middle School, and South Lyon East High School.

Catholic schools are under the Roman Catholic Archdiocese of Detroit. St. Catherine of Siena Academy is in Wixom.

St. William Catholic Church, which includes Wixom in its service area, operates St. William Catholic School, a K-8 school in Walled Lake.

== Religion ==
St. William Church in Walled Lake includes Wixom in its service area. There are also numerous other religious congregations in the area along with a large percent of the population not adhering to any belief system.

== Media ==
The studios of WTVS (Detroit Public Television) are located in the Riley Broadcast Center and HD Studios.

== Police and fire ==
The police station is located in the newly developing downtown area on Pontiac Trail. The Wixom Police Department was formed on October 14, 1957. Prior to 1958, Wixom received police services from the Oakland County Sheriff's Department.

Wixom is protected by Fire Station #1 on North Wixom Road. The Wixom Fire Department is staffed with combination of full-time, paid on-call, and auxiliary firefighters in addition to a full-time fire chief, fire marshal, and an EMS coordinator. The Wixom Firefighters are represented by the Michigan Association of Fire Fighters.

Wixom Firefighters hold their annual Breakfast with Santa and collect non-perishable food. In a typical year, over 1500 pounds are collected and donated to local food banks.

In 1996, two Wixom police officers, Gary Hamlin and Martin Harp, undertook the dangerous task of apprehending and arresting Gerald Atkins (the above-mentioned Ford plant killer) as he sought refuge in a large storm drain. For their bravery and heroism they received awards and commendations, including official thanks in the form of resolutions passed by the state legislature and the National Association of Police Organizations TOP COPS award, which was given during a ceremony at the White House, conducted by president Bill Clinton.

== Geography ==
According to the United States Census Bureau, the city has a total area of 9.37 square miles (24.27 km^{2}), of which 9.15 square miles (23.70 km^{2}) is land and 0.21 square miles (0.54 km^{2}) is water.

== Demographics ==
Historical population
Census	Pop.	Note	%±
1960	1,531		—
1970	2,010		31.3%
1980	6,705		233.6%
1990	8,550		27.5%
2000	13,263		55.1%
2010	13,498		1.8%
2020	17,193		27.4%
U.S. Decennial Census

=== 2020 census ===
As of the 2020 census, Wixom had a population of 17,193. The median age was 35.2 years. 18.1% of residents were under the age of 18 and 11.7% of residents were 65 years of age or older. For every 100 females there were 100.0 males, and for every 100 females age 18 and over there were 99.2 males age 18 and over.

100.0% of residents lived in urban areas, while 0.0% lived in rural areas.

There were 8,478 households in Wixom, of which 21.7% had children under the age of 18 living in them. Of all households, 34.2% were married-couple households, 28.6% were households with a male householder and no spouse or partner present, and 30.9% were households with a female householder and no spouse or partner present. About 45.3% of all households were made up of individuals and 8.7% had someone living alone who was 65 years of age or older.

There were 8,968 housing units, of which 5.5% were vacant. The homeowner vacancy rate was 1.4% and the rental vacancy rate was 6.2%.

Racial composition as of the 2020 census
Race	Number	Percent
White	11,910	69.3%
Black or African American	2,617	15.2%
American Indian and Alaska Native	54	0.3%
Asian	1,260	7.3%
Native Hawaiian and Other Pacific Islander	6	0.0%
Some other race	358	2.1%
Two or more races	988	5.7%
Hispanic or Latino (of any race)	827	4.8%

=== 2010 census ===
As of the census of 2010, there were 13,498 people, 5,725 households, and 3,382 families residing in the city. The population density was 1,475.2 inhabitants per square mile (569.6/km^{2}). There were 6,577 housing units at an average density of 718.8 per square mile (277.5/km^{2}). The racial makeup of the city was 79.8% White, 11.1% African American, 0.2% Native American, 4.9% Asian, 1.9% from other races, and 2.1% from two or more races. Hispanic or Latino residents of any race were 5.1% of the population.

There were 5,725 households, of which 33.6% had children under the age of 18 living with them, 44.0% were married couples living together, 10.9% had a female householder with no husband present, 4.1% had a male householder with no wife present, and 40.9% were non-families. 34.2% of all households were made up of individuals, and 5.3% had someone living alone who was 65 years of age or older. The average household size was 2.36 and the average family size was 3.09.

The median age in the city was 34.8 years. 25.4% of residents were under the age of 18; 9.3% were between the ages of 18 and 24; 31.9% were from 25 to 44; 26.4% were from 45 to 64; and 7% were 65 years of age or older. The gender makeup of the city was 49.9% male and 50.1% female.

=== 2000 census ===
As of the census of 2000, there were 13,263 people, 5,889 households, and 3,150 families residing in the city. The population density was 1,420.0 inhabitants per square mile (548.3/km^{2}). There were 6,086 housing units at an average density of 651.6 per square mile (251.6/km^{2}). The racial makeup of the city was 90.40% White, 2.50% African American, 0.51% Native American, 2.85% Asian, 0.04% Pacific Islander, 1.55% from other races, and 2.14% from two or more races. Hispanic or Latino residents of any race were 3.20% of the population.

There were 5,889 households, out of which 30.9% had children under the age of 18 living with them, 41.8% were married couples living together, 8.0% had a female householder with no husband present, and 46.5% were non-families. 37.4% of all households were made up of individuals, and 4.1% had someone living alone who was 65 years of age or older. The average household size was 2.24 and the average family size was 3.07.

In the city, 24.9% of the population was under the age of 18, 14.0% was from 18 to 24, 39.1% from 25 to 44, 16.5% from 45 to 64, and 5.4% was 65 years of age or older. The median age was 30 years. For every 100 females, there were 109.5 males. For every 100 females age 18 and over, there were 108.0 males.

The median income for a household in the city was $44,320, and the median income for a family was $64,918. Males had a median income of $45,798 versus $30,942 for females. The per capita income for the city was $27,543. About 4.5% of families and 5.4% of the population were below the poverty line, including 4.0% of those under age 18 and 2.2% of those age 65 or over.
