= Walled Lake Central High School =

High school in Walled Lake, Oakland County, Michigan

Location
- 1600 Oakley Park Road; Walled Lake, Michigan; United States; 42.5687°N 83.47247°W

Information
- Former name: Walled Lake High School (until 1968)
- Type: Public high school
- School district: Walled Lake Consolidated Schools
- Principal: Kyle Meteyer
- Teaching staff: 61.80 (FTE)
- Grades: 9-12
- Enrollment: 1,135 (2023–2024)
- Student to teacher ratio: 18.37
- Campus: Suburban
- Colors: Blue and gold
- Mascot: Viking
- Rivals: Walled Lake Northern; Walled Lake Western
- Accreditation: North Central Association of Colleges and Schools
- Feeder schools: James R Geisler Middle School; Sarah Banks Middle School; Walnut Creek Middle School
- Affiliation: Lakes Valley Conference (LVC); Lakes Division
- Website: central.wlcsd.org

Student assessments
- 2021–22 school year Change vs. prior year

M-STEP 11th grade proficiency rates (Science / Social Studies)
- Advanced %: 11.4 / 12.8
- Proficient %: 19.9 / 32.3
- PR. Proficient %: 17.8 / 46.8
- Not Proficient %: 50.8 / 8.1

Average test scores
- SAT Total: 1041.3 (▼ −10.4)

Walled Lake Central High School is an American public high school of the Walled Lake Consolidated Schools, located in Commerce Township, Michigan, in Metro Detroit. It serves portions of Wolverine Lake, a small portion of the City of Walled Lake, and a small portion of Wixom. It was built as Walled Lake High School in 1957 and took its current name a year after its first additions were completed in 1968. The original addition was part of a construction project that included construction of Walled Lake Western High School. More additions were completed in 1992 and 2000.

== Marching band ==
The Walled Lake Central Viking Band was the MCBA Flight I State Champion in 2010, 2011, 2013, 2024, and 2025. The band also performed at the 89th annual Macy’s Thanksgiving Day Parade. In 2021, both Central and Walled Lake Western High School's band combined to form the Walled Lake Marching Band (WLMB). In 2024, the WLMB finished 21st in the nation at the Bands of America Grand Nationals, the highest-scoring team from the State of Michigan.

== Notable alumni ==
- Dax Shepard, actor and podcast host of Armchair Expert
- Justin Goltz, professional American football quarterback and collegiate baseball player
- Adetokunbo Ogundeji, professional American football player for the NFL's Atlanta Falcons
- Kierra Sheard, American gospel singer
- Alex Dalou, professional soccer player, currently for Detroit City FC of the USL Championship
- Becca Gawenda, photographer and social media personality, currently for Michigan State Football
