= Wolverine Lake, Michigan =

- Village
- Village of Wolverine Lake
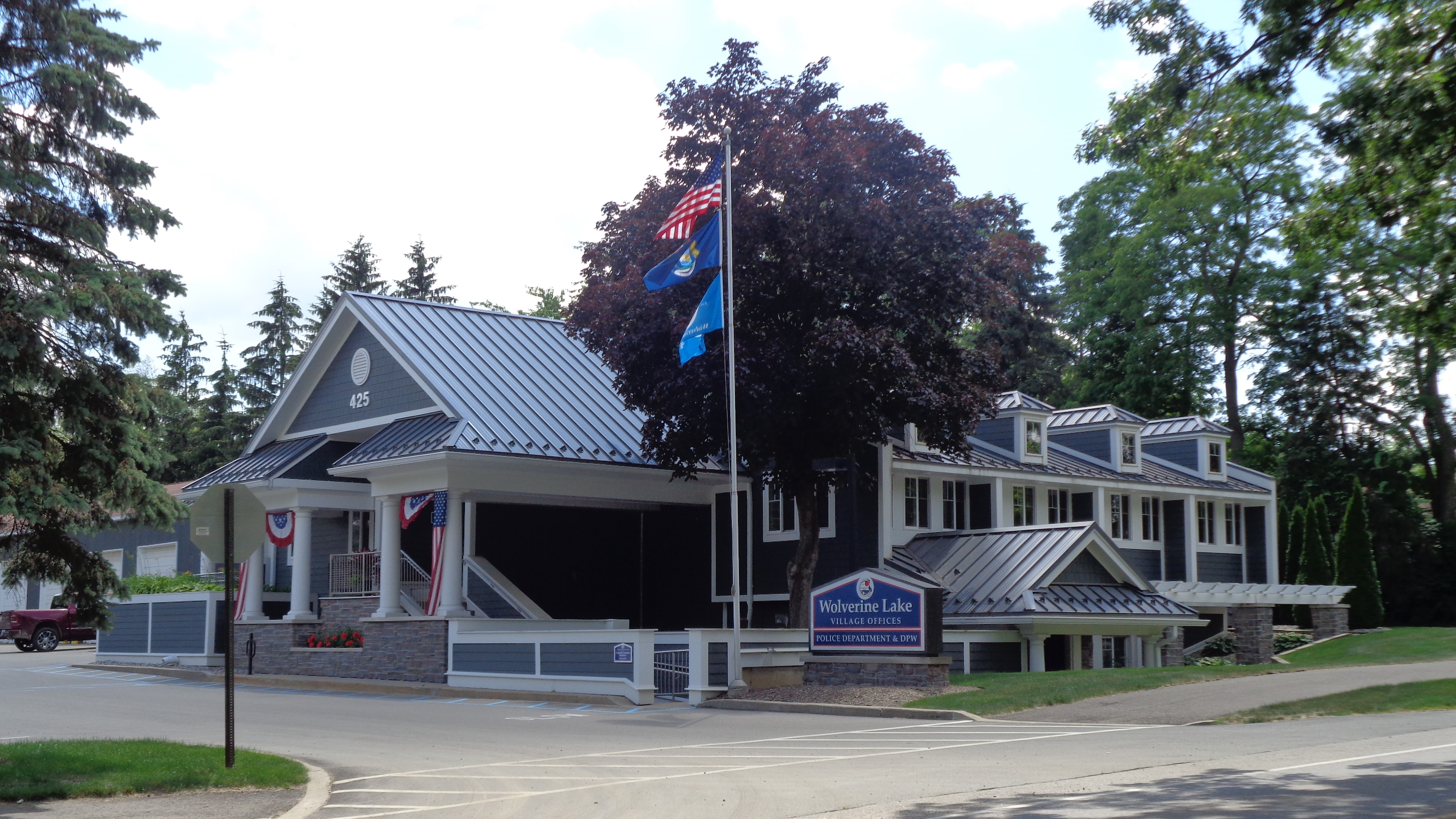
- Wolverine Lake Village Offices

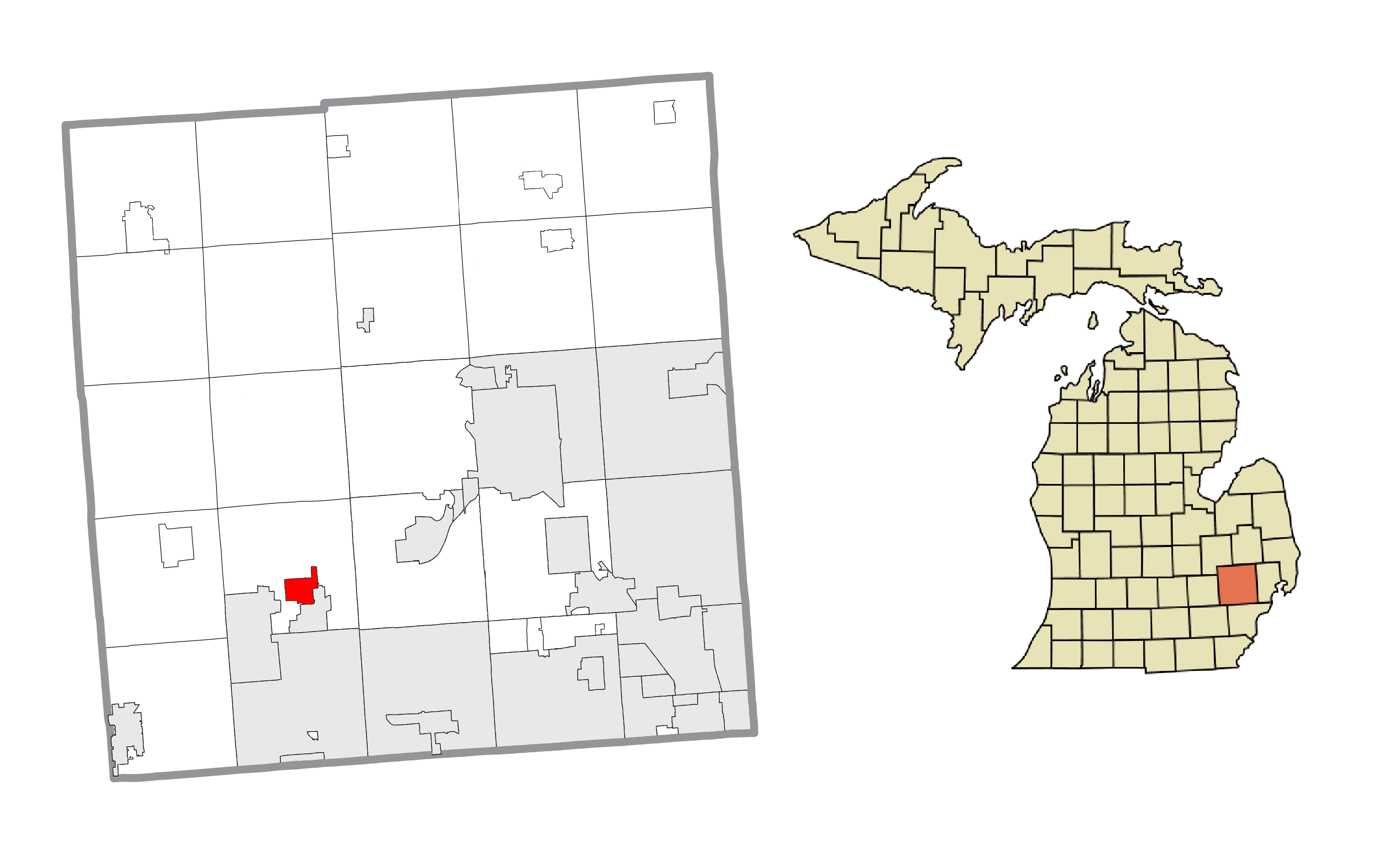
- Location within Oakland County

- Location within the state of Michigan Location within the United States
- Coordinates: 42°33′09″N 83°29′25″W
- Country: United States
- State: Michigan
- County: Oakland
- Township: Commerce
- Incorporated: 1954

Government
  - Type: Village council
  - President: Brian Nedrow
  - Clerk: David Gillam

Area
  - Village: 1.68 sq mi (4.34 km^{2})
  - Land: 1.26 sq mi (3.26 km^{2})
  - Water: 0.42 sq mi (1.09 km^{2})
- Elevation: 932 ft (284 m)

Population (2020)
  - Village: 4,544
  - Density: 3,612.6/sq mi (1,394.82/km^{2})
  - Metro: 4,285,832 (Metro Detroit)
- Time zone: UTC-5 (Eastern (EST))
  - Summer (DST): UTC-4 (EDT)
- ZIP code(s): 48390
- Area codes: 248 and 947
- FIPS code: 26-88260
- GNIS feature ID: 1616717
- Website: Official website

Wolverine Lake is a village in Oakland County in the U.S. state of Michigan. As of the 2020 census, Wolverine Lake had a population of 4,544. The village is located within Commerce Township.

== History ==
Before 1918, Howard Stuart and L. A. Green proposed the idea of damming several small streams in order to create a larger lake. The project was completed in March 1923, and the growing community was petitioned to be named Wolverine Lake by the end of the year. The name was chosen after the wolverine, which is the state animal. Wolverine Lake incorporated as a village in 1954.

== Geography ==
According to the U.S. Census Bureau, the village has a total area of 1.68 square miles (4.35 km^{2}), of which 1.26 square miles (3.26 km^{2}) is land and 0.42 square miles (1.09 km^{2}) (25.0%) is water.

== Demographics ==
Historical population
Census	Pop.	Note	%±
1960	2,404		—
1970	4,301		78.9%
1980	4,968		15.5%
1990	4,727		−4.9%
2000	4,415		−6.6%
2010	4,312		−2.3%
2020	4,544		5.4%
U.S. Decennial Census

=== 2020 census ===
As of the 2020 census, Wolverine Lake had a population of 4,544. The median age was 45.1 years. 17.8% of residents were under the age of 18 and 18.6% of residents were 65 years of age or older. For every 100 females there were 100.4 males, and for every 100 females age 18 and over there were 100.4 males age 18 and over.

100.0% of residents lived in urban areas, while 0.0% lived in rural areas.

There were 1,946 households in Wolverine Lake, of which 25.2% had children under the age of 18 living in them. Of all households, 51.3% were married-couple households, 18.8% were households with a male householder and no spouse or partner present, and 22.2% were households with a female householder and no spouse or partner present. About 26.9% of all households were made up of individuals and 10.8% had someone living alone who was 65 years of age or older.

There were 2,028 housing units, of which 4.0% were vacant. The homeowner vacancy rate was 0.6% and the rental vacancy rate was 4.6%.

Racial composition as of the 2020 census
Race	Number	Percent
White	4,041	88.9%
Black or African American	76	1.7%
American Indian and Alaska Native	6	0.1%
Asian	91	2.0%
Native Hawaiian and Other Pacific Islander	2	0.0%
Some other race	43	0.9%
Two or more races	285	6.3%
Hispanic or Latino (of any race)	147	3.2%

=== 2010 census ===
As of the census of 2010, there were 4,312 people, 1,733 households, and 1,214 families living in the village. The population density was 3,395.3 inhabitants per square mile (1,310.9/km^{2}). There were 1,840 housing units at an average density of 1,448.8 per square mile (559.4/km^{2}). The racial makeup of the village was 95.9% White, 0.7% African American, 0.4% Native American, 1.2% Asian, 0.4% from other races, and 1.4% from two or more races. Hispanic or Latino of any race were 2.4% of the population.

There were 1,733 households, of which 31.4% had children under the age of 18 living with them, 55.7% were married couples living together, 9.2% had a female householder with no husband present, 5.1% had a male householder with no wife present, and 29.9% were non-families. 24.1% of all households were made up of individuals, and 5.6% had someone living alone who was 65 years of age or older. The average household size was 2.49 and the average family size was 2.95.

The median age in the village was 42.7 years. 21.6% of residents were under the age of 18; 7.3% were between the ages of 18 and 24; 25.2% were from 25 to 44; 34.3% were from 45 to 64; and 11.6% were 65 years of age or older. The gender makeup of the village was 51.6% male and 48.4% female.

=== 2000 census ===
As of the census of 2000, there were 4,415 people, 1,671 households, and 1,253 families living in the village. The population density was 3,391.9 inhabitants per square mile (1,309.6/km^{2}). There were 1,733 housing units at an average density of 1,331.4 per square mile (514.1/km^{2}). The racial makeup of the village was 97.76% White, 0.41% African American, 0.11% Native American, 0.59% Asian, 0.07% Pacific Islander, 0.25% from other races, and 0.82% from two or more races. Hispanic or Latino of any race were 1.04% of the population.

There were 1,671 households, out of which 35.8% had children under the age of 18 living with them, 63.9% were married couples living together, 7.5% had a female householder with no husband present, and 25.0% were non-families. 20.0% of all households were made up of individuals, and 5.2% had someone living alone who was 65 years of age or older. The average household size was 2.64 and the average family size was 3.06.

In the village, the population was spread out, with 25.5% under the age of 18, 6.0% from 18 to 24, 33.2% from 25 to 44, 27.8% from 45 to 64, and 7.5% who were 65 years of age or older. The median age was 38 years. For every 100 females, there were 103.1 males. For every 100 females age 18 and over, there were 102.2 males.

The median income for a household in the village was $65,682, and the median income for a family was $70,893. Males had a median income of $50,054 versus $32,342 for females. The per capita income for the village was $30,026. About 2.2% of families and 2.7% of the population were below the poverty line, including 3.0% of those under age 18 and 4.1% of those age 65 or over.

== Education ==
It is within the Walled Lake Consolidated Schools. Guest Elementary School and Loon Lake Elementary School serve portions of Wolverine Lake. Portions are zoned to James R. Geisler Middle School, and portions are zoned to Sarah Banks Middle School. All of Wolverine Lake is zoned to Walled Lake Central High School.
