= Southfield City Centre =

Area of Southfield, Michigan, United States

- Mixed-use development
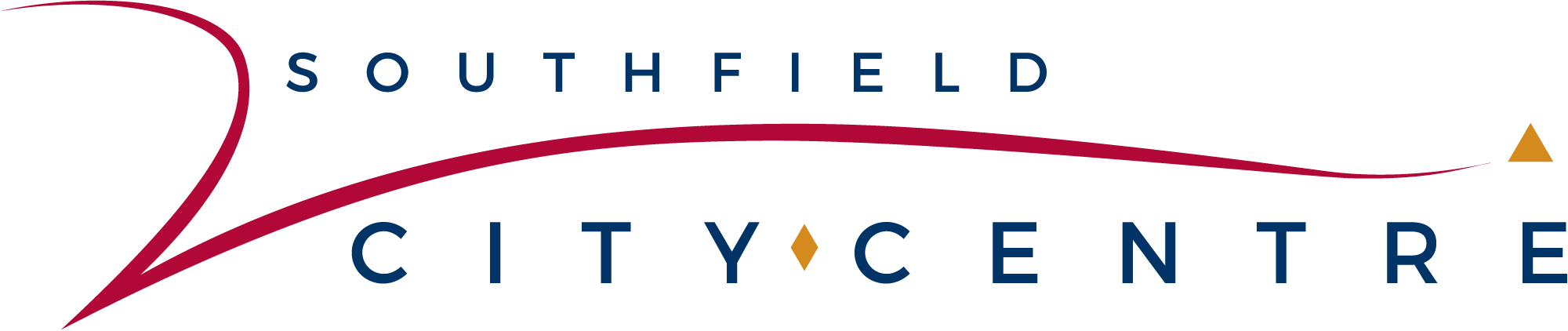
- Country: United States
- State: Michigan
- County: Oakland
- City: Southfield

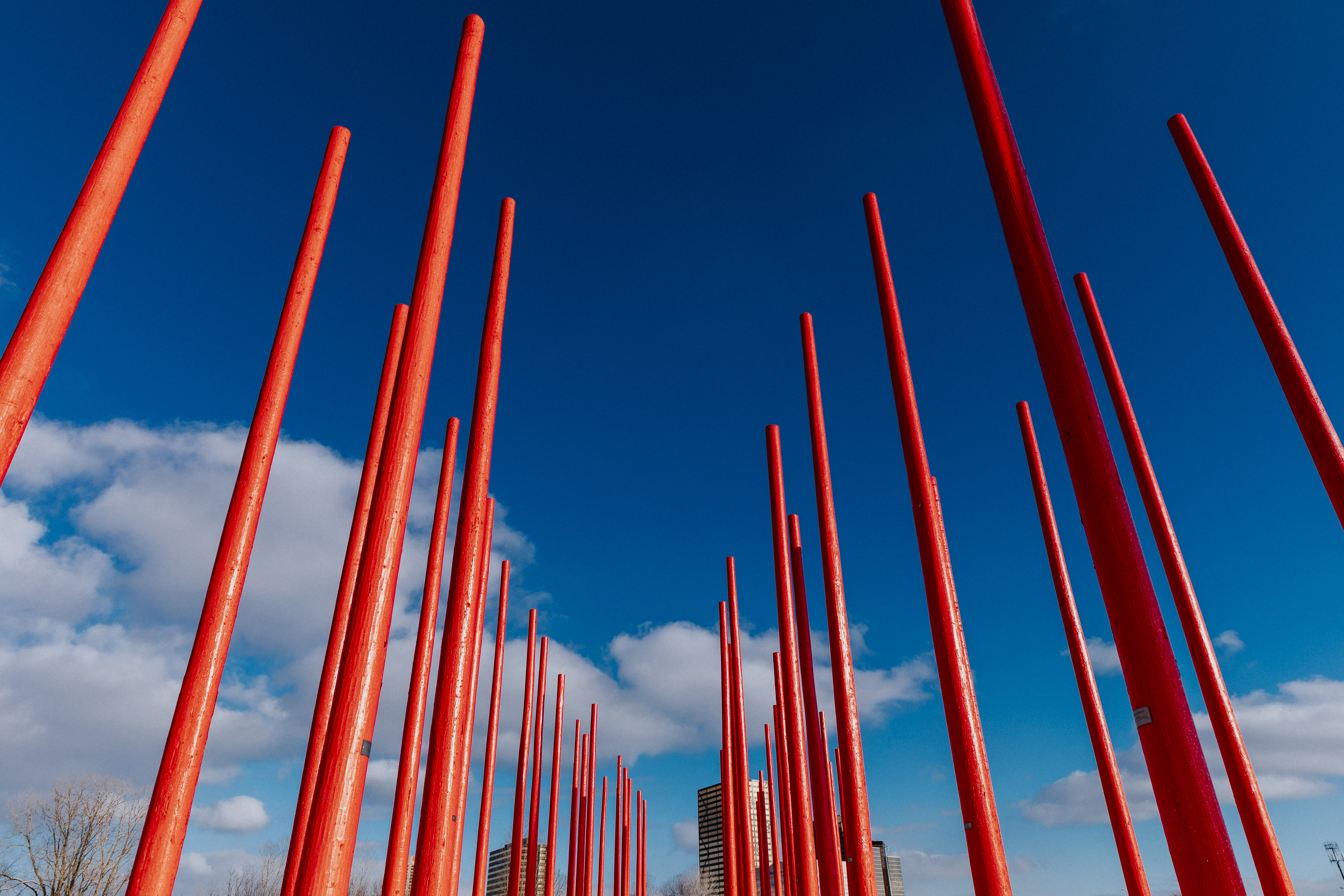
Art Installation: Red Pole Park

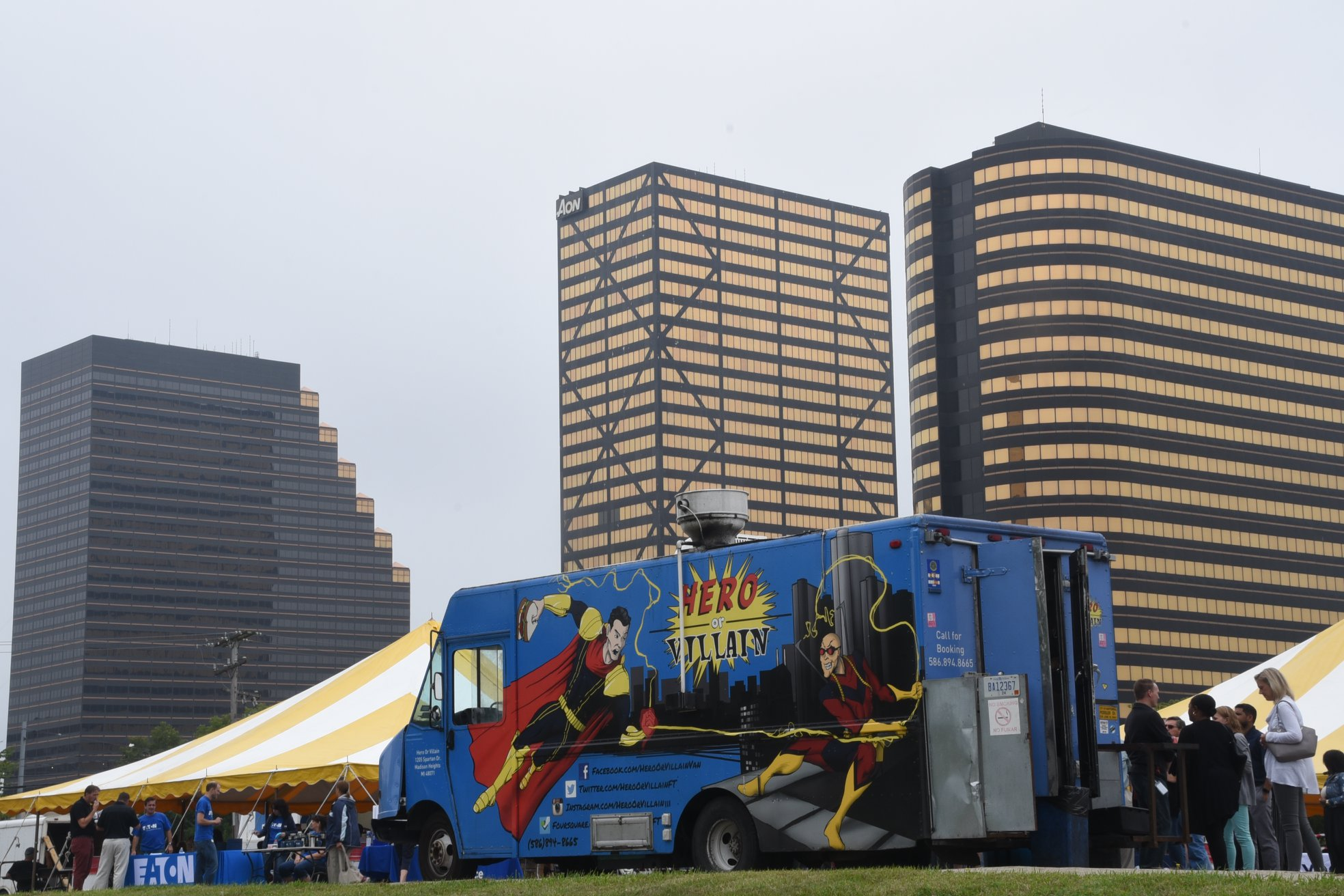
Eat to the Beat food truck and music event (Sept. 2018)

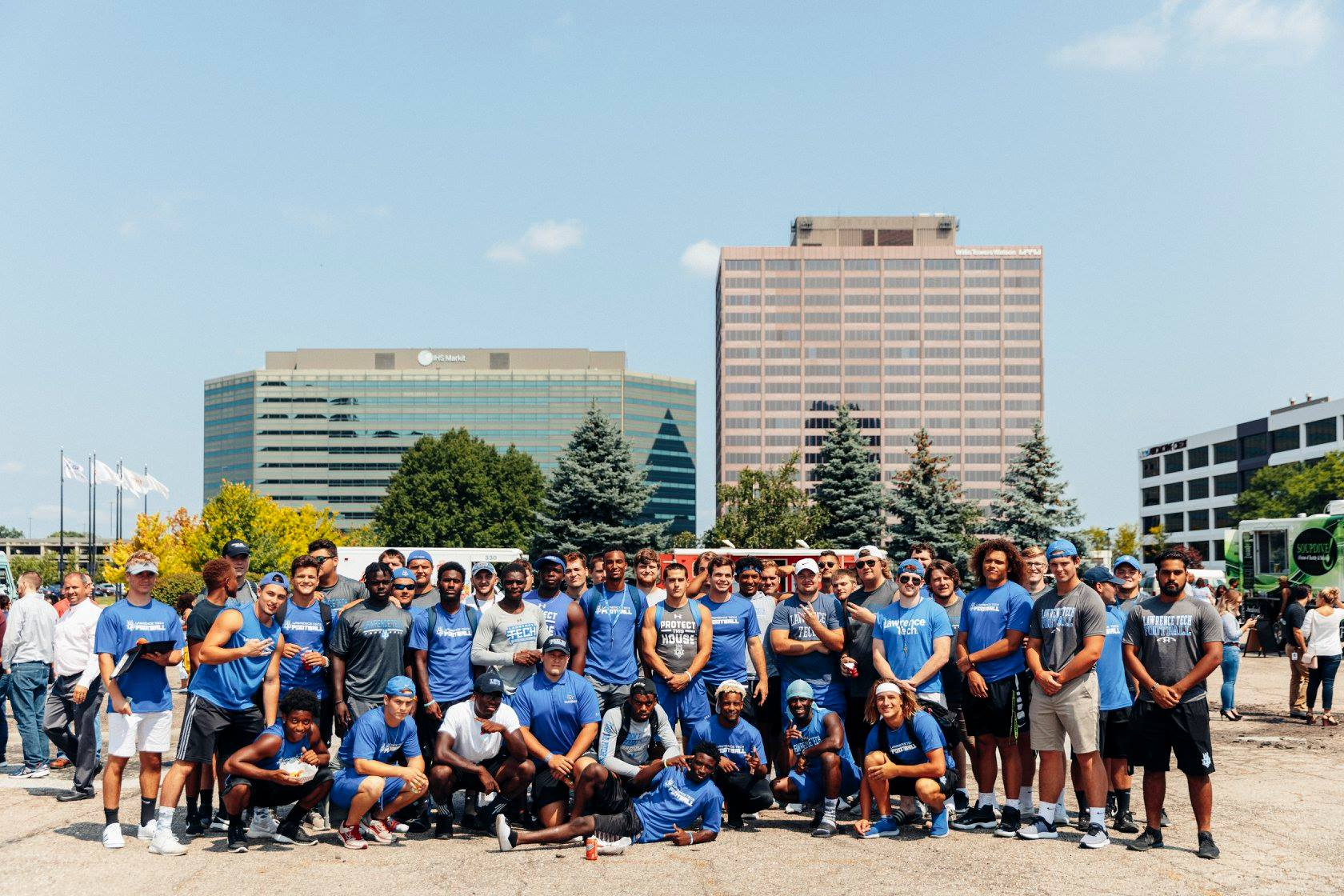
Athletes from Lawrence Technological University

Southfield City Centre is a mixed-use area consisting of a major business center, private university, and residential neighborhoods, located near the intersection of Interstate 696 (I-696, Walter P. Reuther Freeway) and the M-10 (Lodge Freeway) in Southfield, Michigan. The area spans 1.766 square miles (1,130.609 acres) and includes historical landmarks, a university campus, the Donald F. Fracassi Municipal Campus, nine-hole Evergreen Golf Course and 7.75 miles of shared-use urban trails designed to promote heart-healthy activity, encourage community interaction, creative collision and social networking.

== Overview ==
The Southfield City Centre was created in 1992 as a special assessment district, and it was originally planned to improve pedestrian amenities and facilitate economic development. The area has approximately 36,000 (including retail) office workers in finance, insurance, real estate, health care, IT, automotive, government, education, software, and other emerging industries. The City Centre is a pedestrian friendly mixed-use district for the City of Southfield.

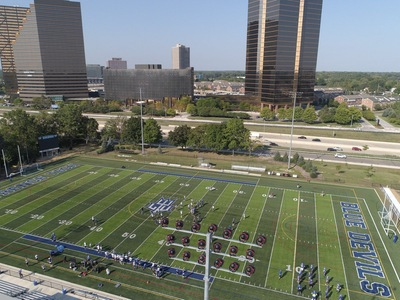
Lawrence Technological University Athletic Stadium

The main campus of Lawrence Technological University forms the western boundary of the district. Additionally, satellite campuses of Central Michigan University and Siena Heights University exist locally.

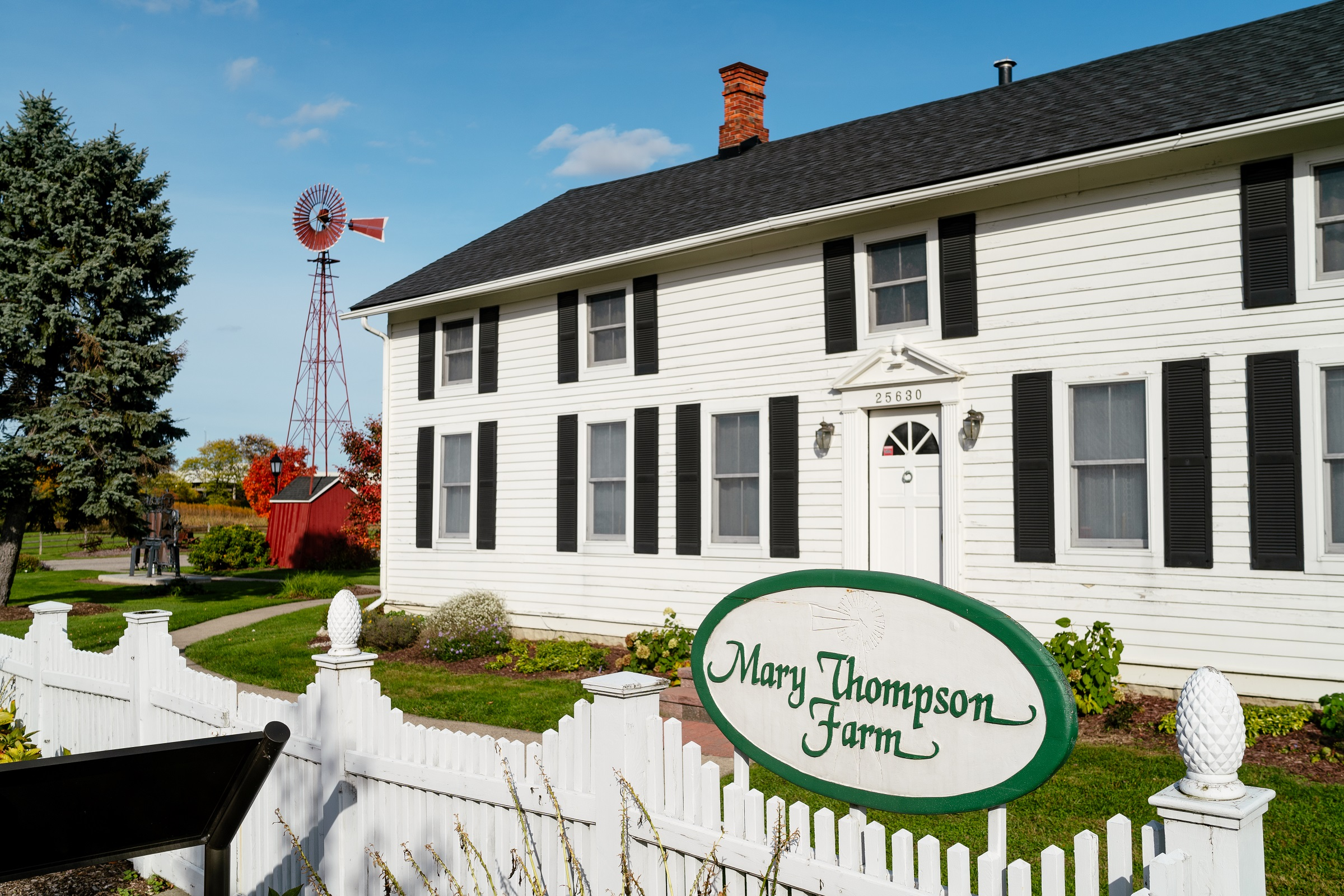
Mary Thompson Farm

Historically significant sites such as the Mary Thompson Farm and Southfield Reformed Presbyterian Church are located along the Evergreen Road corridor.

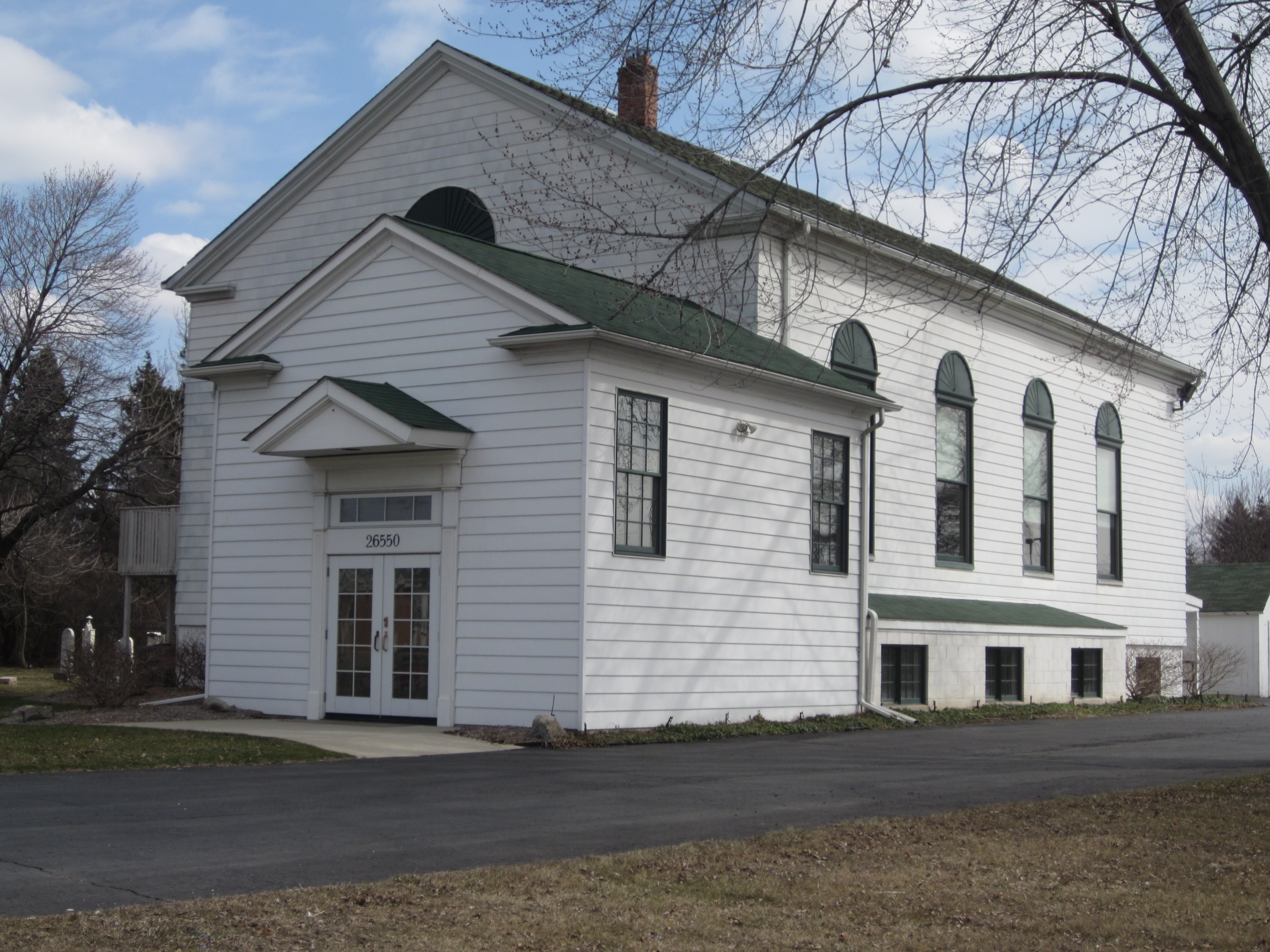
Southfield Reformed Presbyterian Church, also known as Covenanter Church, was a trusted stop on the Underground Railroad.

Southfield Public Library operates the library, which serves residents of Southfield and neighboring Lathrup Village.

== History ==
On August 24, 1992, through ordinance No.1352 and pursuant to Act No. 146 of the Public Acts of 1992 (PRINCIPAL SHOPPING DISTRICTS, Act 120 of 1961, as amended), the Southfield City Council established the City Centre Advisory Board (CCAB) “to promote economic activity in the City Centre, and to provide for the maintenance, security, and operation of the City Centre."

The City Centre Advisory Board (CCAB) currently has 11 members to oversee the special assessment district. The board members are appointed by the mayor with confirmation by the city council. As the district's geography has expanded, the board has grown from an initial nine members to its current size of 11 members.The Director of Planning and the Southfield Planning Department provide staff support and project management to the board.

The majority of CCAB members are representatives of City Centre businesses; one represents the City of Southfield (mayor), and one is a resident representative who resides in the boundaries of the City Centre. A primary goal of the CCAB is to attract and retain professionals to the City Centre district. The CCAB's overall vision for the City Centre is a vibrant pedestrian-friendly center of education, commerce, culture, entertainment, and community activity.

Since 1994, the City Council, at the request of the CCAB, has approved several special assessments to establish annual operating budgets for activities within the City Centre District. The CCAB has utilized these funds to develop, promote, and maintain the City Centre area.

Examples of the use of these funds include: 1) Placemaking through crosswalks; wayfinding signage; public art installations; sidewalk infill and new shared-use pathways; enhanced bus stop shelters; district gateways; and significant financial contribution to the reconstruction of Evergreen Road between Ten and Eleven Mile Roads; 2) Marketing of businesses and events through Social Media and the creation and maintenance of the Southfield City Centre website; and 3) Promotion of Special Events (i.e. Food Trucks, Concerts, 5K Race, etc.) in the district.

On March 14, 2017, the CCAB voted to request Council to expand the boundaries of the City Centre District to include [the properties in Exhibit A: FY 2017-2022 CITY CENTRE SAD MAP approved 4/17/17] and authorize a special assessment of five cents ($.05) per square foot of gross nonresidential building area within the newly expanded City Centre District for a period of five fiscal years effective July 1, 2017 through June 30, 2022. Monies raised will provide funds annually to the CCAB for development, operation, and maintenance, and to promote activities within the district. The council approved Special Assessment P-1174 (FY 2017-2022) on June 12, 2017.

== Mission and purpose ==
In 2016, the city adopted Sustainable Southfield, the second Master Plan to be adopted in the city's history. The plan was developed with support of the residents and businesses, and created a long-term vision for the City Centre district. The Plan is being updated in 2021.

According to Sustainable Southfield, "sustainable communities are places that balance their economic assets, natural resources, and social priorities so that residents' diverse needs can be met now and in the future." As a Comprehensive Master Plan, "Sustainable Southfield will take a holistic approach to land use and community planning, which will include environmental, social, and economic sustainability.

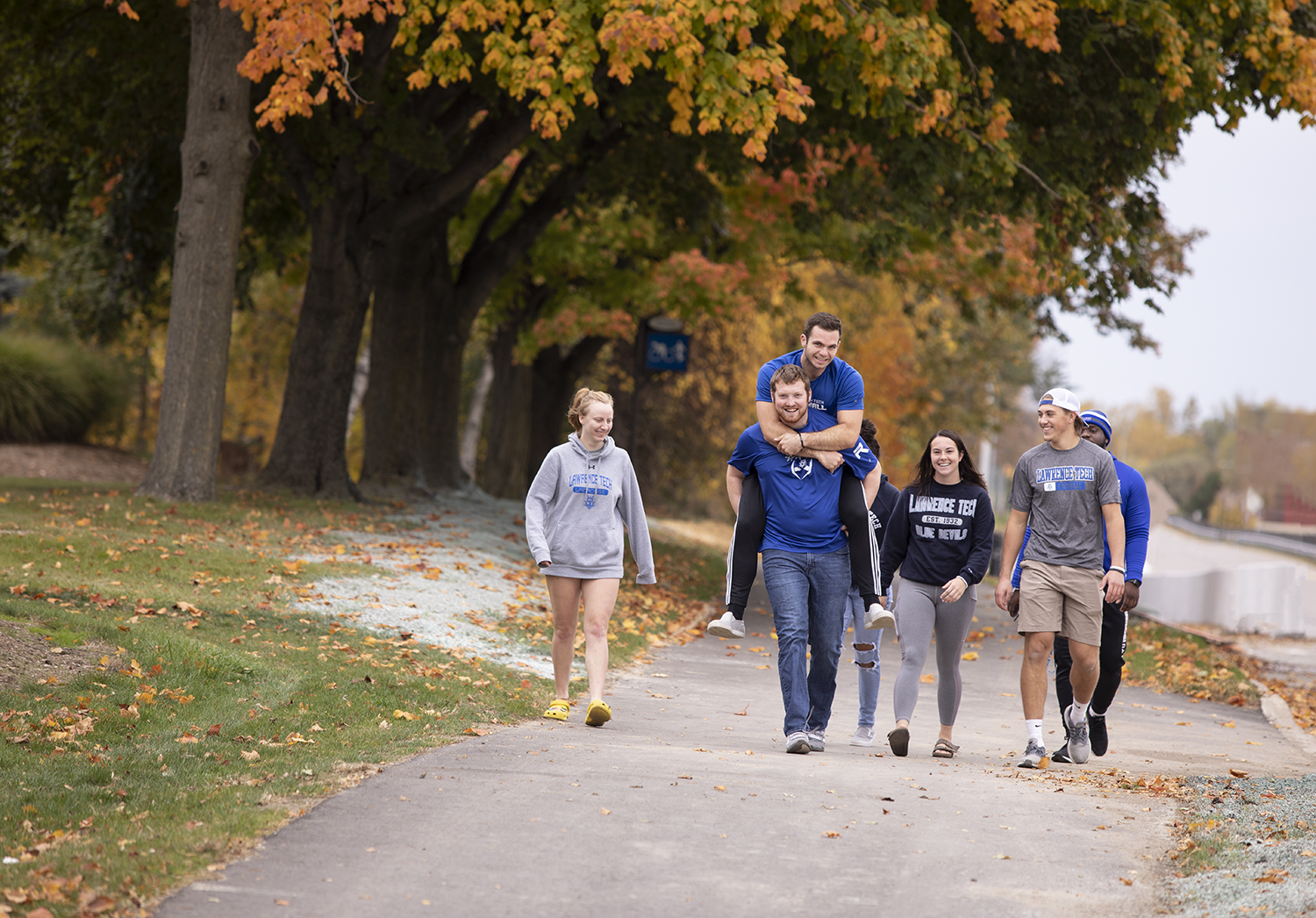
LTU Students Walking Path in Southfield City Centre

The top three priorities requested during the public input process were:

1. Walkability and connectivity throughout the City Centre (i.e. sidewalks, bike paths, increased pedestrian amenities, etc.)

2. Street and road repair.

3. Redevelopment and/or renovation of older commercial properties.

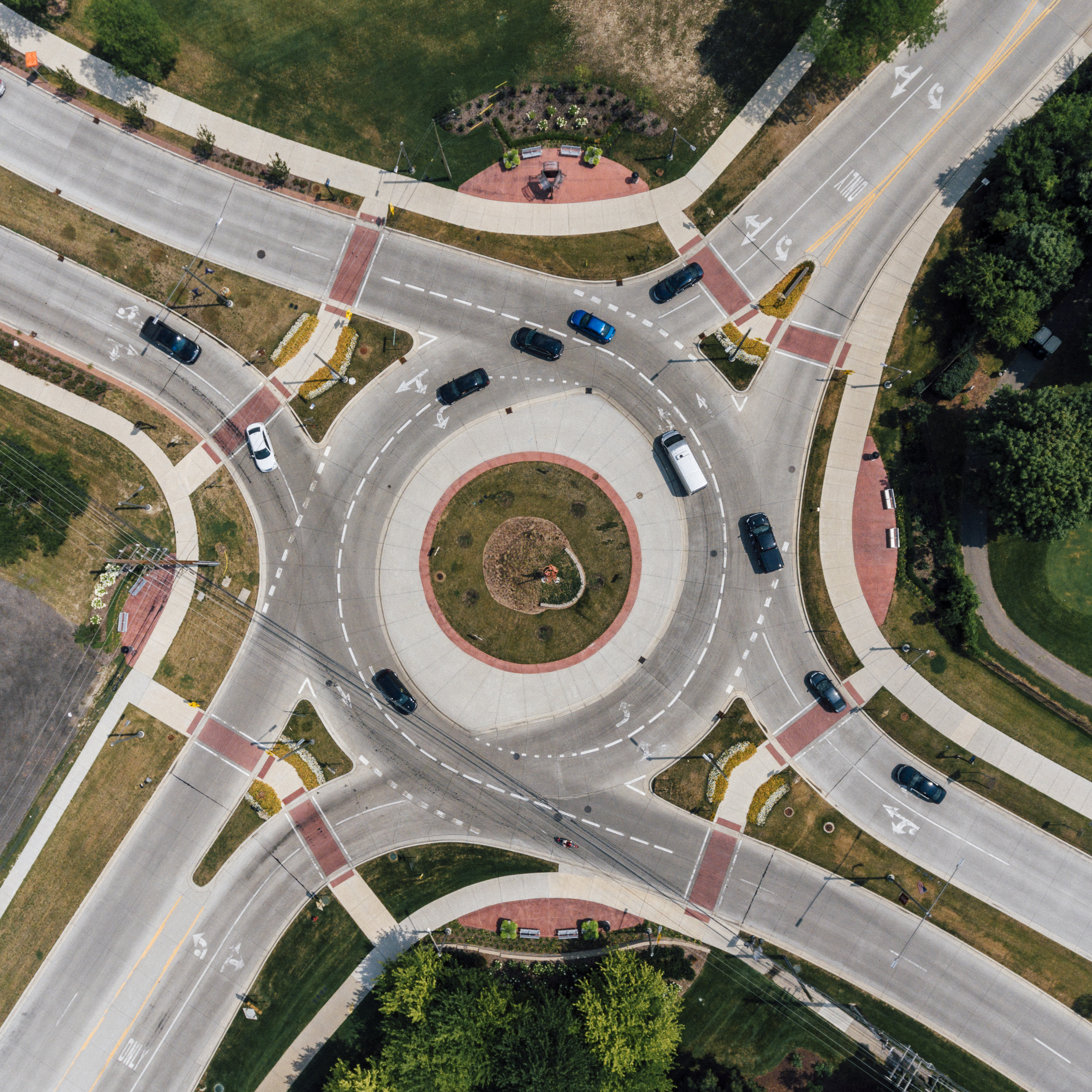
Evergreen Road roundabout, Southfield City Centre

== Evergreen Road development ==
On October 19, 2015, the City of Southfield formally completed the Evergreen Road Improvement. The project cost approximately $12 million, with $4.8 million in federal transportation funding for the road construction, and $450,000 from a Michigan Transportation Alternatives Program grant for the pedestrian amenities and stormwater mitigation features. The City's Water and Sewer Fund contributed $3.5 million, and the Major Street Fund contributed $700,000. The Metro Act Fund provided $1 million, the CCAB contributed $100,000 toward the pedestrian amenities, and the Local Improvement Revolving Fund contributed the remaining $1.5 million.

Approximately 21,500 motorists travel this road daily.

The project reconstructed a one-mile segment of Evergreen Road between 10 and 11 Mile Roads, reducing from six and seven-lane roads into a four-lane boulevard, and incorporating two roundabouts, one at Evergreen and Civic Center Drive (south roundabout) and one at Evergreen and the Municipal Campus driveway (north roundabout).

Reconstruction included enhancements of landscaping, green infrastructure, irrigation, bollards, planters, LED street lighting, electrical outlets for holiday displays, benches, trash receptacles, bus shelters, mid-block crossings, way-finding signage, historic interpretive panels, shared-use pathways, and sidewalks.

Storm water improvements included permeable pavers, bio-retention pond, native plant materials, acquisition of easement for 60-inch storm sewer to improve drainage, replacement of the City's 12-inch water main along the roadway. These improvements reduce storm water runoff by an estimated one-third, or 32,000 cubic feet, and filters the water before it reaches streams and other waterways.

Hubbell, Roth & Clark, Inc. provided design and construction engineering services, and Michael J. Dul & Associates, Inc. provided landscape architecture services. Dan's Excavating, Inc. was the construction contractor. The project was given the tagline of "The Magnificent Mile" by City officials.

== Mid-century modern architecture ==
Southfield's city hall was built in 1964 as part of the wider Civic Center Campus, and was designed by Pirscher & Jarrett. The former Federal-Mogul Staff Office building was built in 1966 and designed by Louis A. Rossetti. The Southfield Municipal Campus was renamed the "Donald F. Fracassi Municipal Campus" in 2020 to honor the long-term former Mayor and Councilman Donald F. Fracassi.

Both buildings are considered examples of the Mid-century modern movement.

In 2020, the former Federal-Mogul building underwent planned renovation to remove the exterior concrete pillars. The renovations were done to accommodate the new tenant to the building, Marelli North America, a tier one automotive supplier.

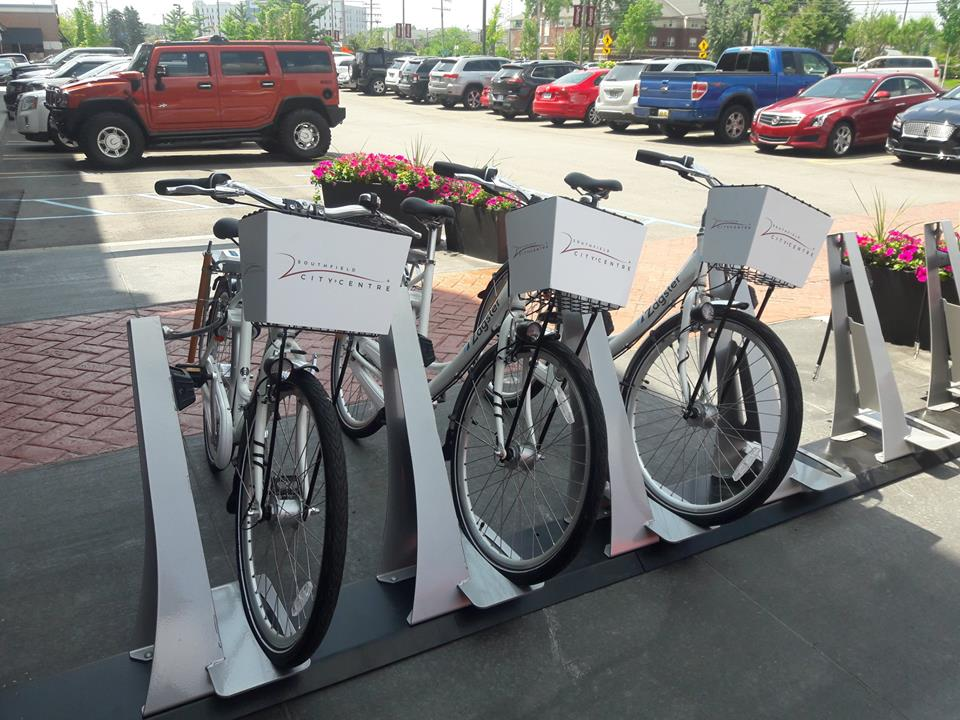
Bike share station at City Centre II building

== Bike share ==
In 2017, the Southfield City Centre launched its first bike-share program and contracted with Zagster to install seven stations with 27 cruiser-style bicycles, including a three-wheel accessible version, available for short-term use by residents, visitors, and the district workforce.

By 2019, the number of bike-share stations increased within the Southfield City Centre to nine.

Due to the economic impact of the coronavirus pandemic in spring 2020, Zagster ceased operating in the Southfield City Centre. By the third quarter of 2020, the City Centre had contracted with a replacement bike-share provider, Tandem Movatic, which placed nine bike-share stations throughout the district.

== Public art ==
In 2015, the Southfield City Council approved, through Ord. No. 1657; and Enactment of Arts Commission: Ord. No. 1630, a measure to incorporate public art in the City and established a Public Arts Commission. The city purchased 18 pieces of art, many by mid-century American artists, from the bankrupt Northland Center with a loan for $500,000. The city moved the art in April, 2015, established a Public Arts Commission and fundraised $600,000 to repay the loan and begin restoration. In 2019, Southfield Mayor Kenson Siver established the nonprofit Friends of the Southfield Public Arts to "finance the procurement, transport, installation and restoration of art for public enjoyment in the City of Southfield.

The fund also supports public engagement of the arts and arts education.

== Art from the Northland Center ==
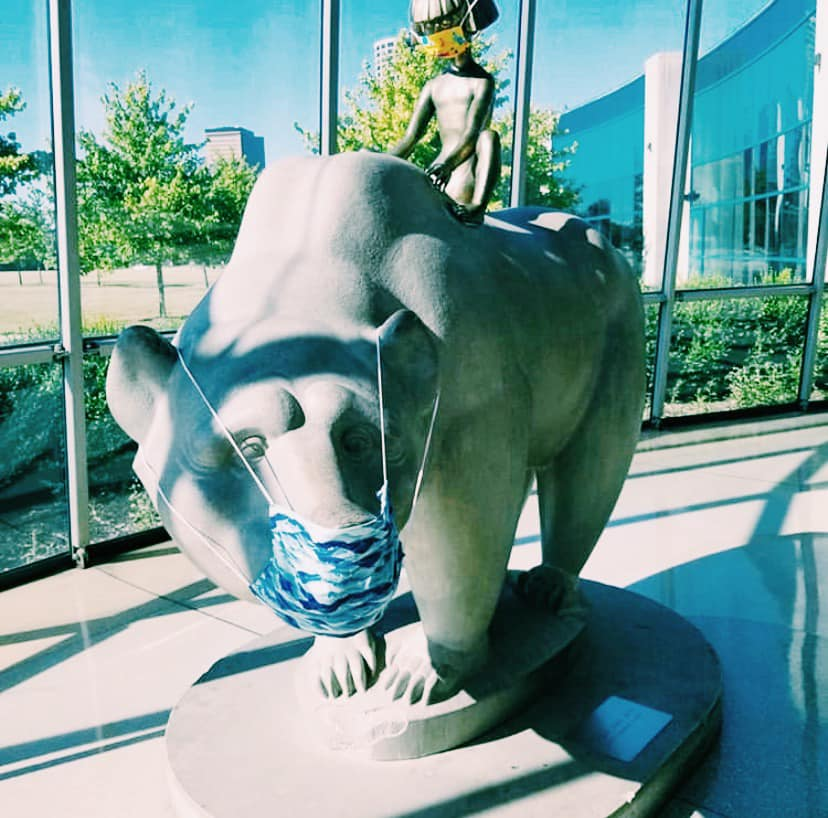
“Boy and Bear” by Marshall Fredericks

In May, 2016, Boy and Bear, a sculpture by artist Marshall Fredericks was the first piece to be placed and now sits inside the lobby entrance to the Southfield Public Library.

Prophet, a sculpture by artist Sorel Etrog was restored and installed in the side garden of the Southfield City Hall in March 2018.

The Crowd by Italian sculptor Gio Pomodoro is on loan to the 2000 Southfield Town Center building and sits in the lobby.

The Peacock, by Arthur Kraft and Gwen Lux was restored and placed in the circular drive outside the main entrance to the Southfield Public Library in October, 2018.

In February, 2019, Moby Dick, a sculpture by artist Joseph Anthony McDonnell, was placed in the fountain in the grounds of the Southfield Public Library. In the spring of 2019, the fountain was refurbished and the surrounding area landscaped to create a public park.

During the first quarter of 2021, a sculpture that once stood in the Northland Theater was purchased and restored through a plan by the Southfield Public Arts Commission and Friends of Southfield Public Arts. Seated Female Figure (artist unknown) was placed on a pedestal and installed in an existing flower bed on the Southfield Pavilion Plaza between the Southfield Police Station and the 46th District Court.

== Other public art ==
Two sculptures by local artists sit in the center of the two traffic roundabouts that are on Evergreen Road. Diversity, by John Piet, former art professor at Macomb Community College and 35-year resident of Southfield sits in the center of the northern Evergreen Road roundabout. Gratitude, by nationally-acclaimed Southfield sculptor Jay Lefkowitz, sits in the southern Evergreen Road roundabout.

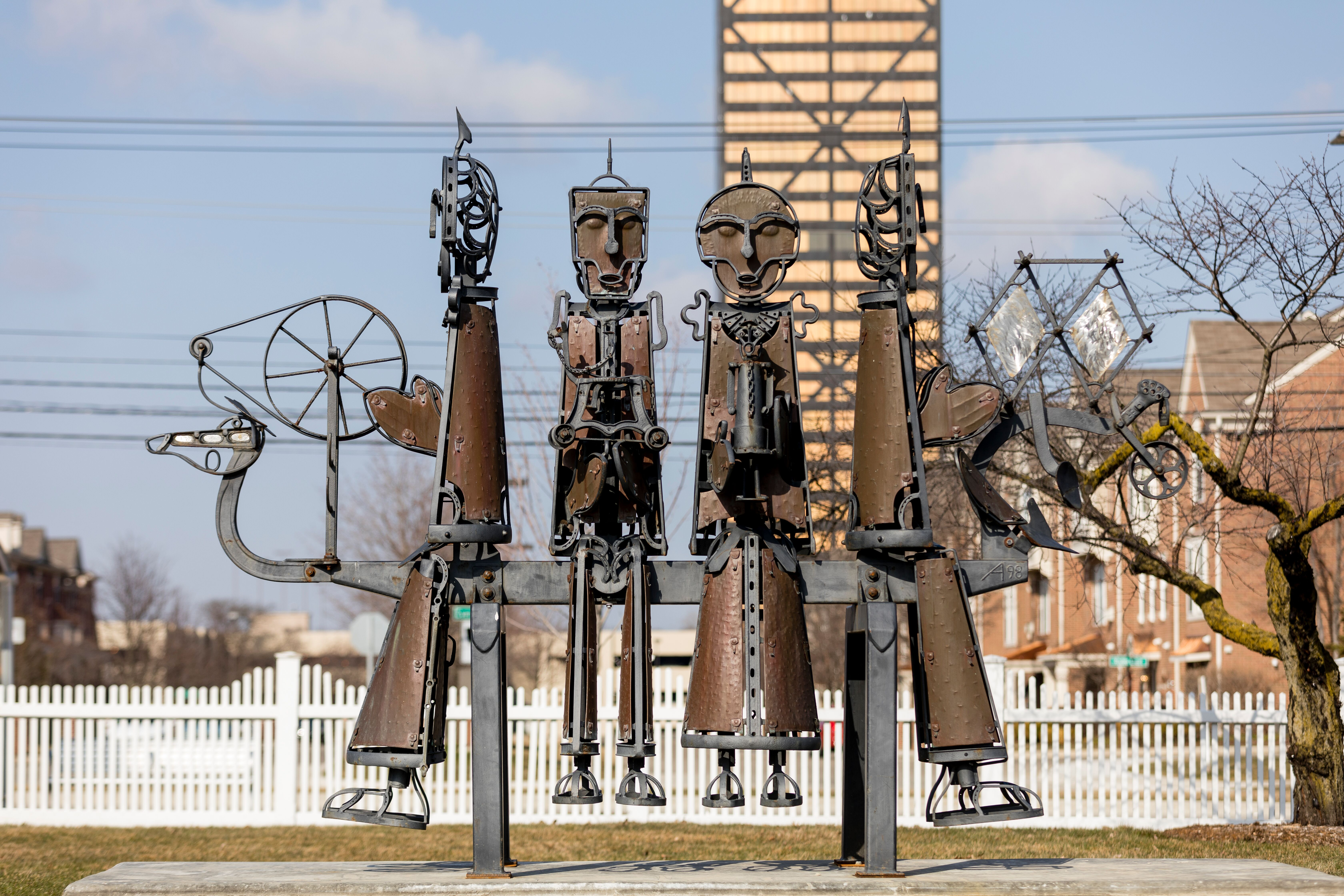
“Pioneer Family II” by Andres Drenters, located at Mary Thompson Farm.

In 2017, Pioneer Family II, a sculpture created by Belgian-Canadian artist Andreas Drenters was installed at Mary Thompson Farm, a historical farm site that complements the materials used for the sculpture.

In 2019, The City of Southfield, a steel sculpture by Melvin Leiserowitz and commissioned for the city's 25th anniversary in 1983, was removed from its former home at the rear of the Southfield Civic Center. the piece was restored to repair damage inflicted due to a water main break and replaced in 2020 south of the main entrance circle in front of Southfield City Hall.

In 2019, Friends of Southfield Public Arts purchased Yin Yang, a steel sculpture by Michigan Modernist sculptor David Barr, from the private collection of a Southfield resident who was moving to another location within the Southfield City Centre. The piece was installed in 2020 in the traffic triangle bounded by Evergreen Road, 10 Mile Road and the Northwestern Highway northbound service drive.

In 2020, three Southfield Peace Poles were installed in a landscaped garden to the north of the entrance to the Southfield City Hall. The poles declare "May Peace Prevail on Earth" in 24 world languages and Braille. With a theme of sustainability, the poles represent global peace through the May Peace Prevail on Earth International and Amig@s de la Paz (Peace Pals) nonprofit organizations. The installation was dedicated on Nov. 6, 2020.

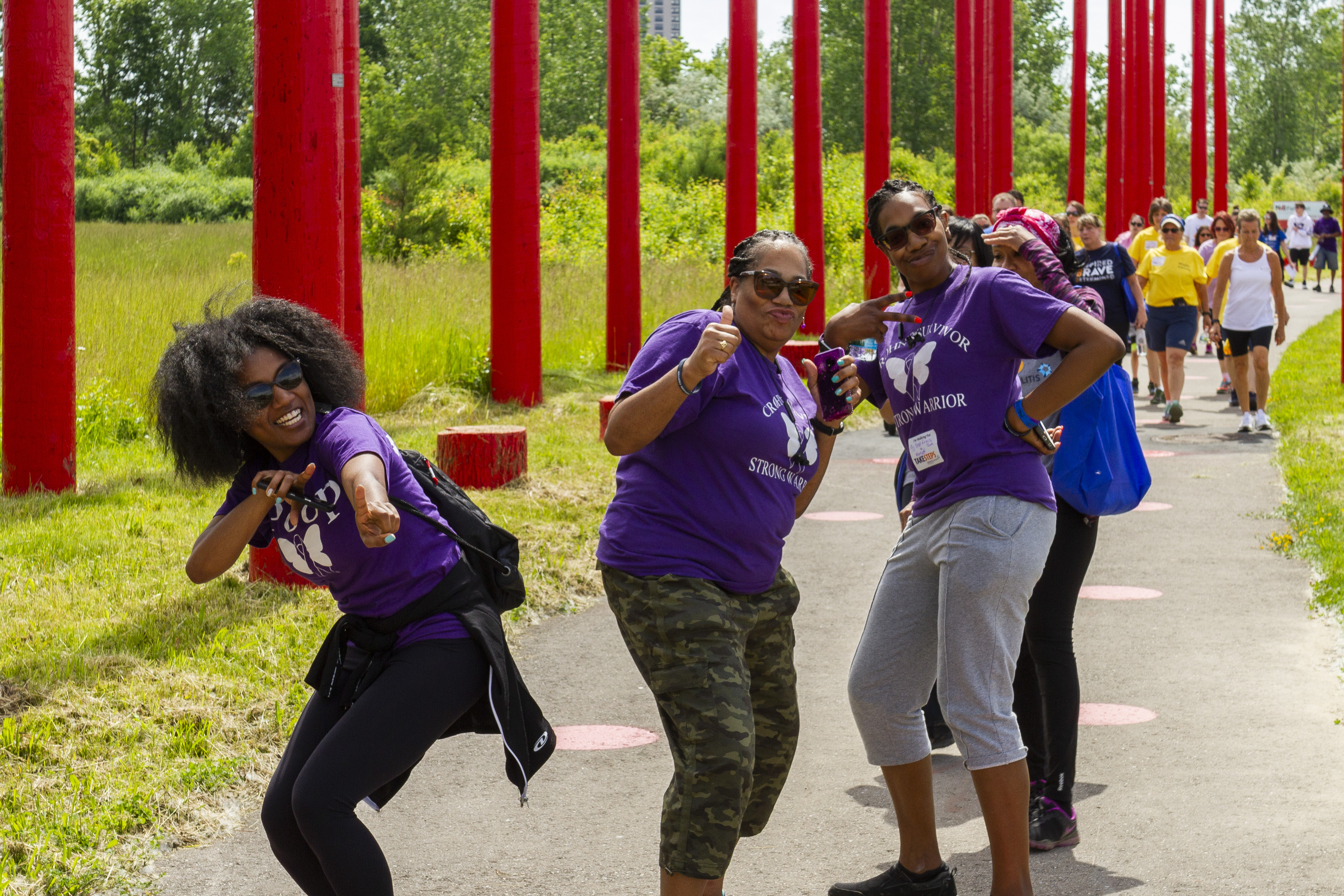
Southeast Michigan Take Steps - Crohn's & Colitis Foundation Walk (June 2019)

== Red Pole Park ==
In August 2018, Red Pole Park opened officially on the shared-use path along the Northwestern Highway service drive, north of Civic Center Drive. The 140-linear foot interactive park has 65 repurposed, 35-foot tall telephone poles painted red. In March, 2019, a majority of the poles were topped with solar-activated, battery-powered blue lights. The park was funded by 3,665 sponsors in a 2017 Patronicity crowdfunding campaign and a matched grant through the Michigan Economic Development Corporation's (MEDC) Public Spaces, Community Places initiative.

The poles represent the conscious choice of the community to embrace civic values. Throughout the city's history, the community members have prioritized and embraced values that are commonly held and which connect the community into a complex whole of sustainability, stewardship, and education.

The red, a symbol of strength and the color of energy, love, and passion, inspires action. The tallest poles are a symbol of the ancestors of the city who were rooted in civic mindfulness. The shorter poles represent new growth. Others are red circles on the pathway, which symbolize the generations to come who will continue to practice civic values.

On October 22, 2020, Red Pole Park was recognized by the Michigan Chapter of the American Association for Landscape Architects (ASLA). The recognition took place in the association's virtual State of the Chapter and Awards Ceremony.

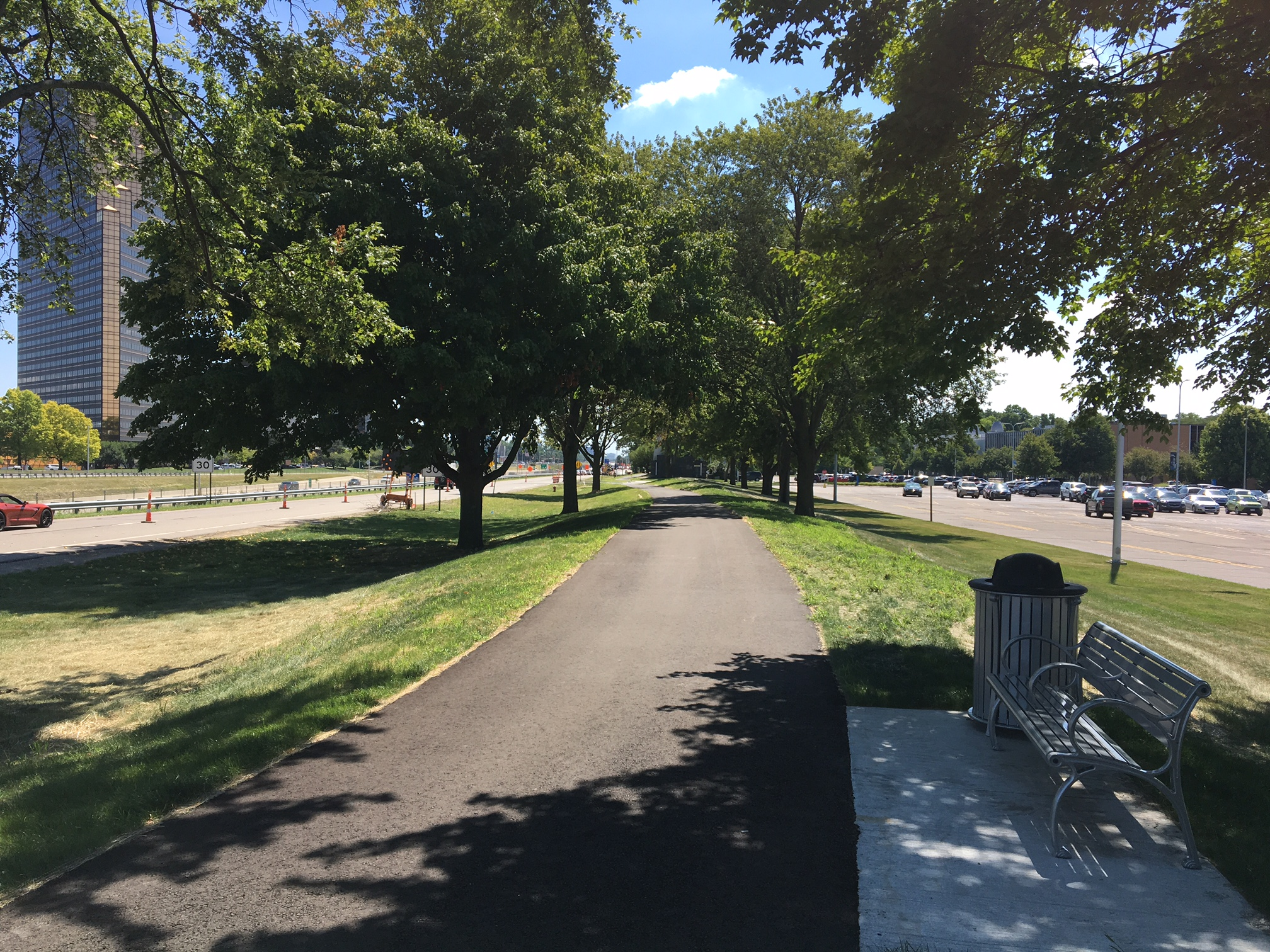
Southfield City Centre Trail, a 7.75-mile pedestrian, bike, wheelchair, stroller and pet-friendly greenway.

The General Design Merit Award was presented by ASLA President Wendy Miller to Landscape Architects Mijung Ko, ASLA, PLA, LEED GA and Mark Hieber, ASLA, LEED AP, Principal at HED, an architecture and engineering firm retained by the Southfield City Centre to design the first phase of a shared use pathway system and this environmental art feature as a centerpiece for community engagement.

The award is significant in that it was adjudicated by the Iowa Chapter of ASLA, rather than by a local panel.

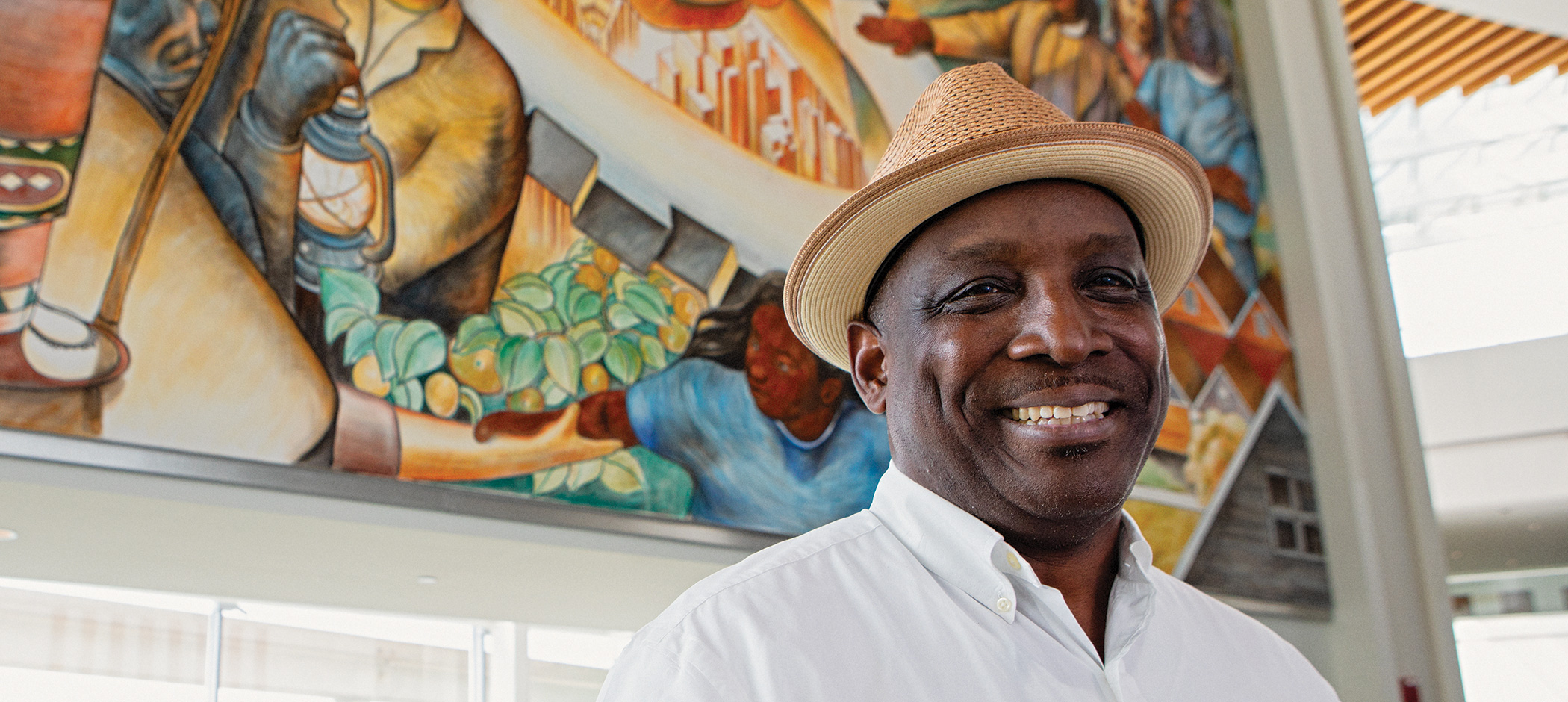
Artist, Dr. Hubert Massey

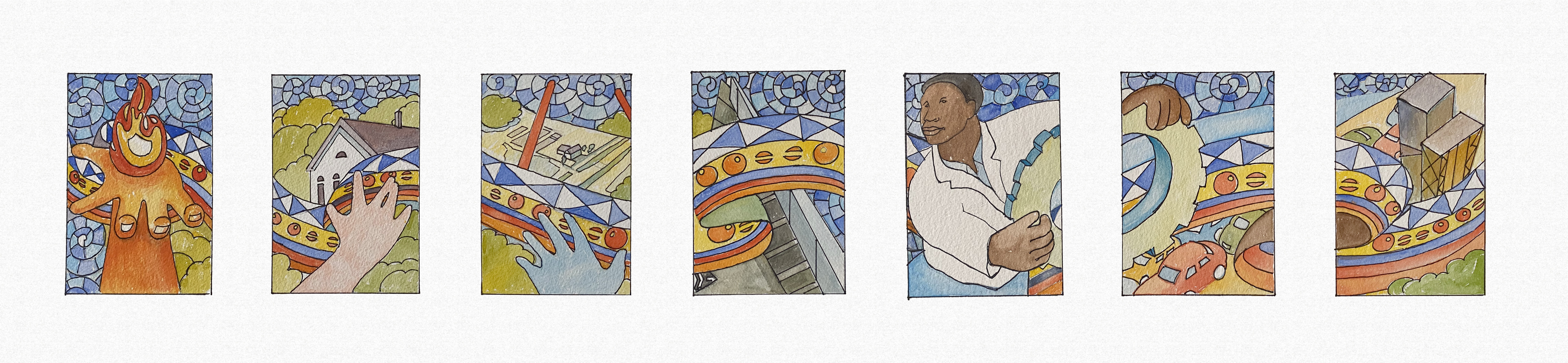
Renderings of Art Panels by Dr. Hubert Massey

== Hubert Massey art installation ==
During 2020, the Southfield City Centre Advisory Board approved funding for the installation of two triptych mural sets commissioned to renowned Detroit muralist Hubert Massey. Through public engagement in two town-hall style meetings, made virtual due to the 2019 outbreak of coronavirus, Massey gathered input from the Southfield community to develop mosaics on the panels which will line the LTU segment of the path. The community-build installation is expected to be installed in fall 2021.

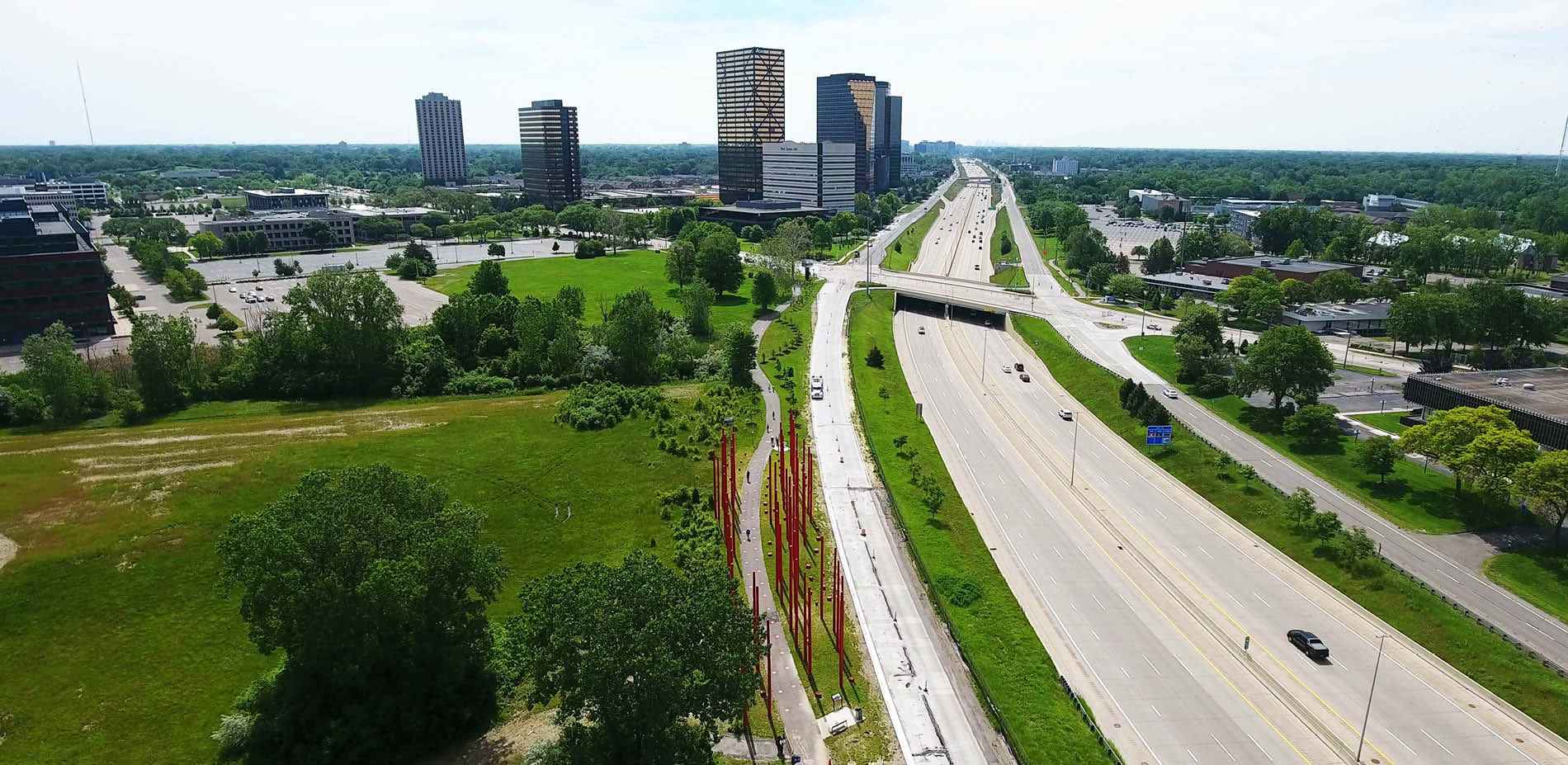
Aerial Photo of Southfield City Centre Trail

== Southfield City Centre Trail ==
Integral to the City Centre is its connected pedestrian- and bicycle-friendly shared-use path, which spans 7.75 miles. The four-season path highlights public art, historical landmarks, bike-share stations, decorative birdhouses and nature. In 2019 and 2020, the areas along northbound and southbound Northwestern Highway service drive underwent construction to expand the shared-use path and on-street bicycle lanes.

In December 2020, the most recent segment of the trail was completed and marked by a ribbon-cutting ceremony in 2021. The mid-segment of the trail runs along southbound Northwestern Highway between Civic Center Drive and W.10 Mile Road, adjacent to the campus of Lawrence Technological University. The new path connects the Southfield City Centre and LTU to the existing Southfield City Centre Trail to provide safe non-motorized access for students, faculty and staff to the City Centre.

The trail's 10-foot wide shared-use path was built to standards set forth by the American Association of State Highway and Transportation Officials Guide for the Development of Bicycle Facilities. In addition, this tree-lined portion of the trail was designed to preserve nature and includes a 14-foot concrete pathway with decorative fence adjacent to the Evans Drain.

The path section was funded in part through a Transportation Alternatives Program (TAP) grant, allocated by the Southeast Michigan Council of Governments (SEMCOG). The balance of funding was shared between the Southfield City Centre and LTU. The City of Southfield received notification of the TAP award on June 14, 2018. The estimated construction cost of the project was $847,687, and the TAP grant contribution was $455,378. Additional costs for engineering, design, contract inspection, management and administration were paid by LTU.

On April 5, 2019, the City of Southfield Planning Department presented to the City Centre Advisory Board the Southfield City Centre Trail Map which highlights the shared-used pathway throughout the district, a milestone in the movement from a vehicle-centric center to a pedestrian- and bicycle-friendly, walkable district.

The trail map has undergone several updates to the initial version, and in the fourth edition, published in October 2020, highlighted updates to public art installations and new businesses that have moved into the district.

In May 2021, the City Centre Trail was presented virtually at the National Planning Conference (NPC21) session entitled "Placemaking — When Your River Is Actually a Freeway."

== Public events and amenities ==
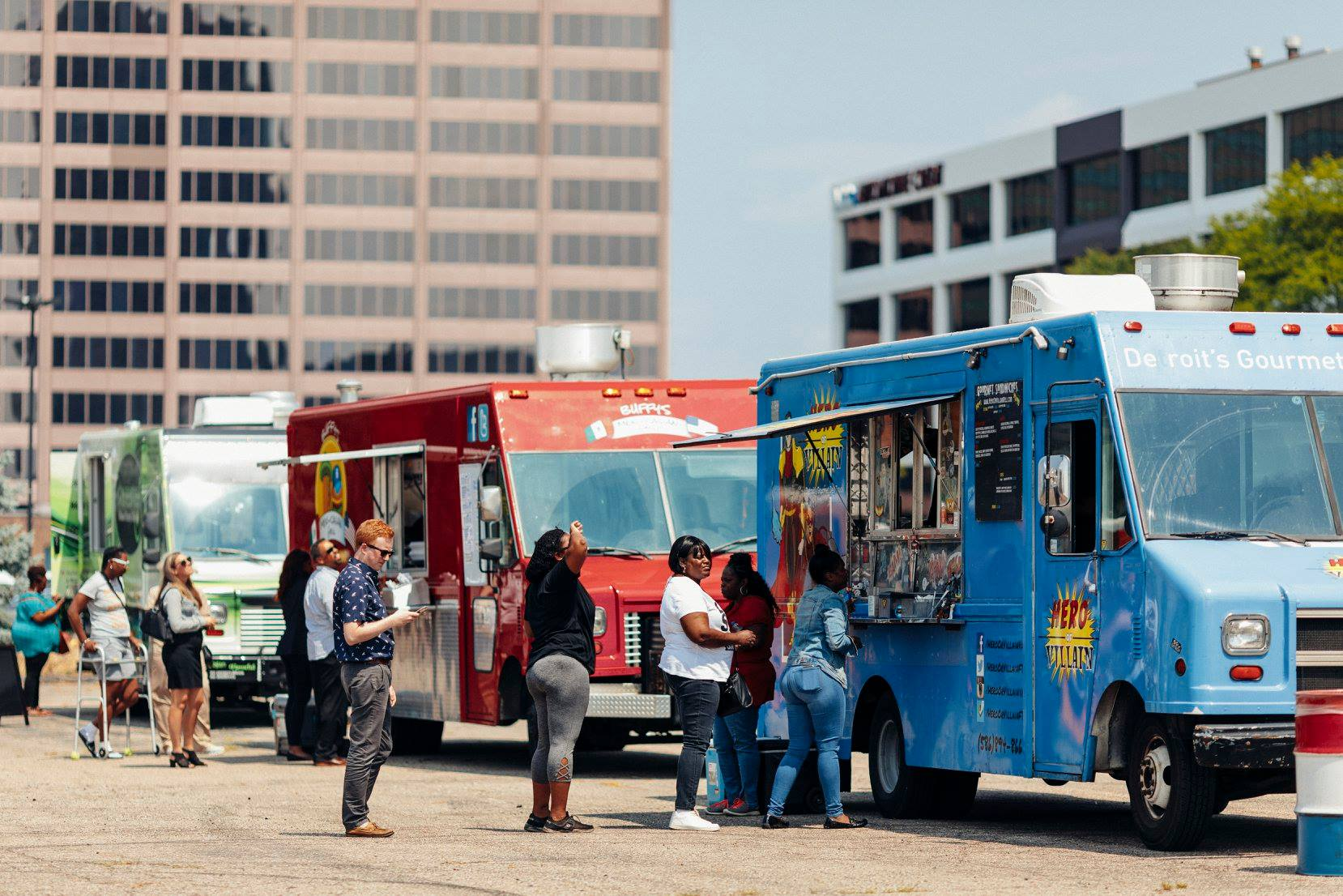
Eat to the Beat event (2018)

The Southfield City Centre hosts and sponsors public events and festivals each year, including concerts, food truck rallies, and sponsored walks. A summer-long "Eat to the Beat" concert and food truck series takes place on the 2nd Thursdays of June, July, August, and September each year at Central Park Blvd. and Civic Center Dr.

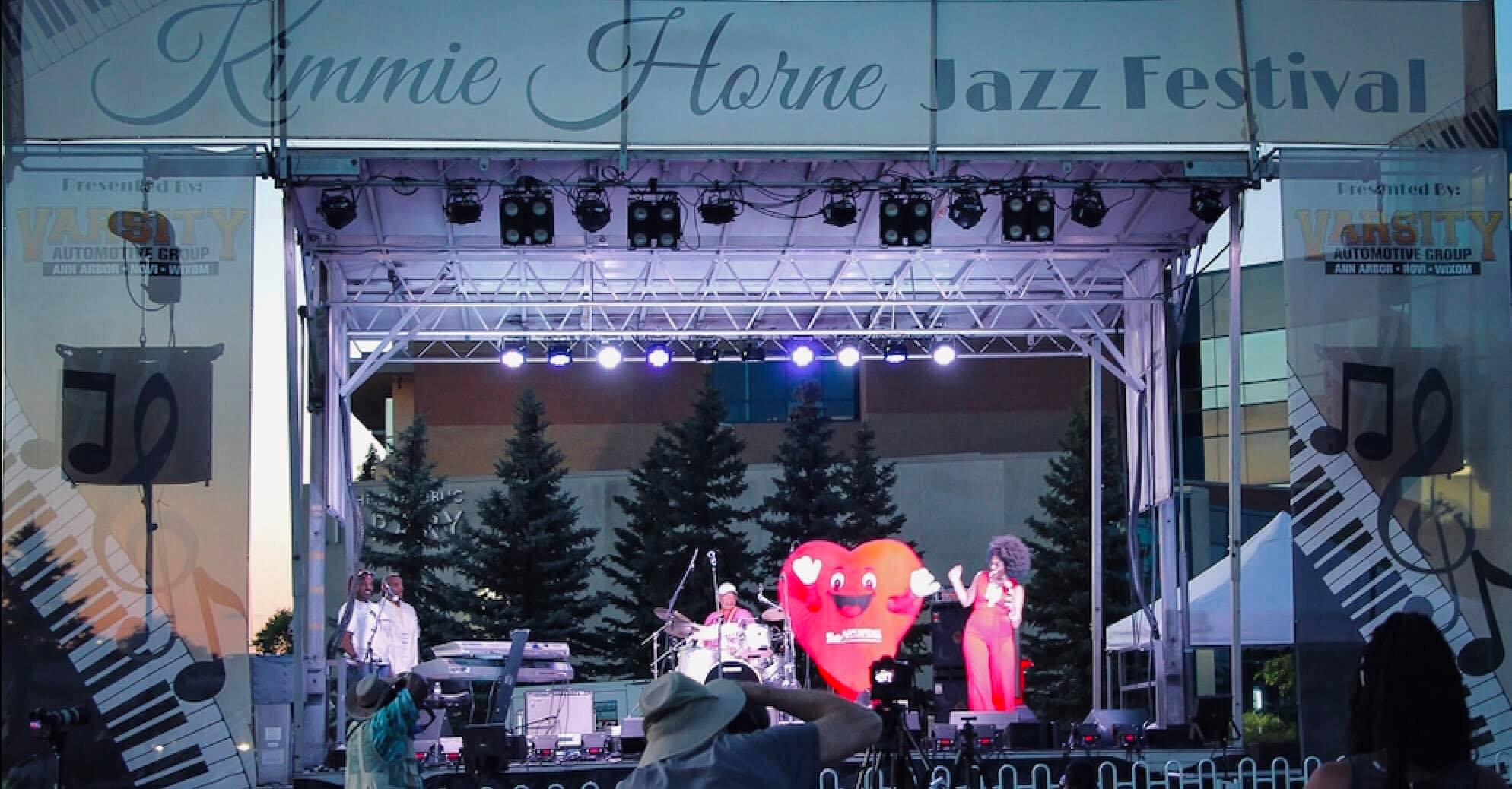
Kimmie Horne Jazz Festival

Beginning in August 2018, Southfield City Centre holds its annual Jazz Festival, featuring jazz artist Kimmie Horne. In June 2018 and 2019, the Crohn's & Colitis Foundation Michigan Chapter held its fundraising and awareness-raising events in the Southfield City Centre, utilizing the district's shared path amenities.

Amenities that exist in the City Centre district, and which complement the expanding share-used trail, include outdoor "rooms" which have art installations, nature interpretive panels, rain gardens, pedestrian respite areas, bike repair stations and additional interactive green spaces.

During 2019-2021, the City of Southfield installed whimsical bird houses along the shared-use path to provide visual interest (Placemaking) for humans and residences for birds.

Situated along the Southfield City Centre Trail, on the southwest corner of Evergreen Road and Civic Center Drive, is a Little Free Library that was installed on August 13, 2020 and dedicated on August 16, 2020 to Lucky, a black Labrador retriever that was once the pet of a former elementary school principal in the Southfield Public School District. Lucky, who accompanied the principal to school, sat as young children read to her, increasing exposure to literacy and appreciation for reading among the students. The "Lucky Little Library" was initially stocked with dog-themed books for a variety of ages and people are encouraged to take a book or leave a book when they visit.

On October 22, 2019, the Southfield City Centre held its first annual Historical Ghost Walk. On the guided tour, participants learned about pre-colonial Southfield, the days of the active Underground Railroad, and the celebration of educator and early settler Mary Thompson on the farm she bequeathed to the City of Southfield.

The tour highlighted information about how Southfield was settled, how the City Centre advanced from acres of farmland bisected by a Native American trail that led south to Detroit, how Fannie Richards worked to bring equity to education, and how the city earned its name.

The event raised funds for the Southfield Historical Society and the Friends of the Southfield Public Arts, and was made possible by the volunteer efforts of a team from Southfield Department of Planning, Southfield Business and Economic Development, Southfield Public Arts Commission, Southfield Public Library, Southfield Parks & Rec, Southfield Area Chamber of Commerce, Southfield Public Schools, Lawrence Technological University and others.

== EverCentre plan ==
A 8.6-acre parcel of land made available in 2010 by the demolition of three vacant buildings is the site of EverCentre, a conceptual development designed by Hamilton-Anderson Associates through research by Gibbs Planning Group. In 2017, EverCentre received the Planning Excellence Award for Urban Design by the Michigan Chapter of the American Planning Association.

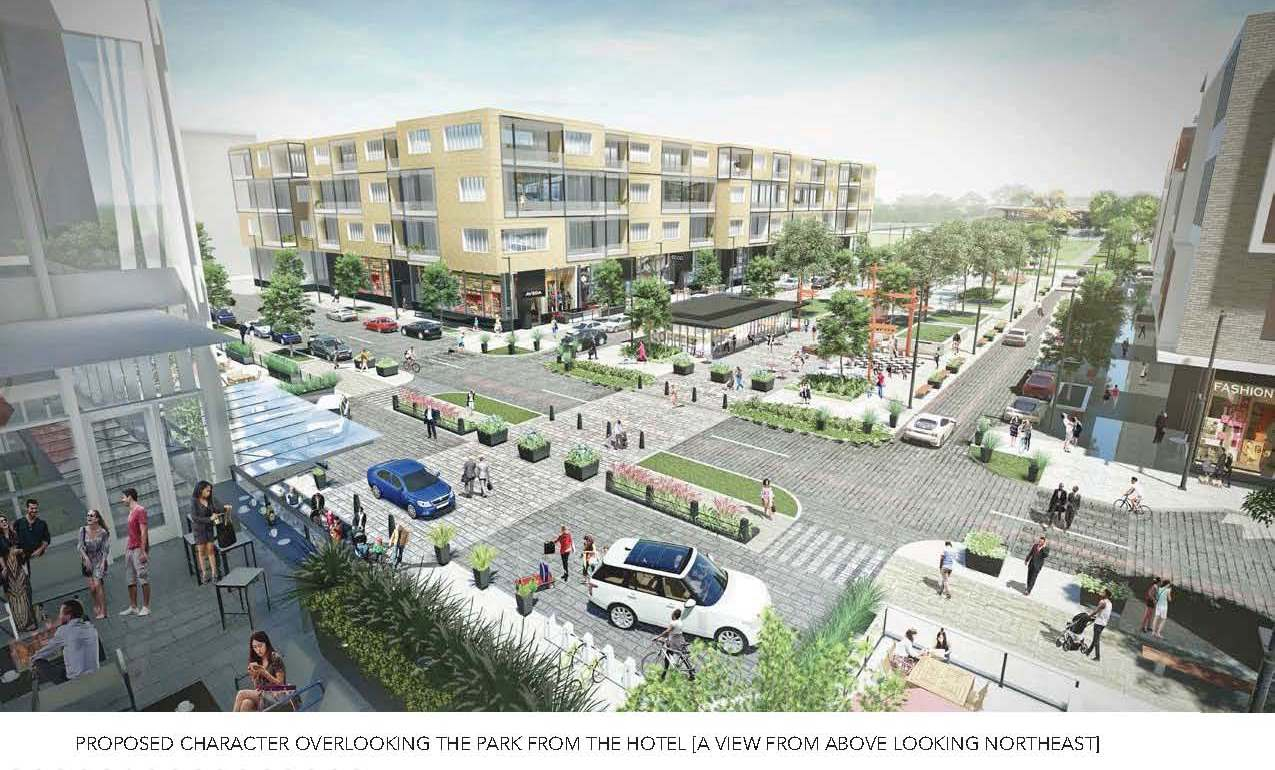
EverCentre Concept Plan

The plan proposes 184,000 square feet of retail, restaurants, and flex space, 250 units of multi-family rental and condos, a parking garage, boutique hotel and conference center, and linear public green space. The City of Southfield is currently seeking commitments from development teams to purchase and break ground on the project.

== Southfield City Centre response to COVID-19 ==
During the 2020 coronavirus pandemic, the Southfield City Centre responded by pivoting annual outdoor events to an online format.

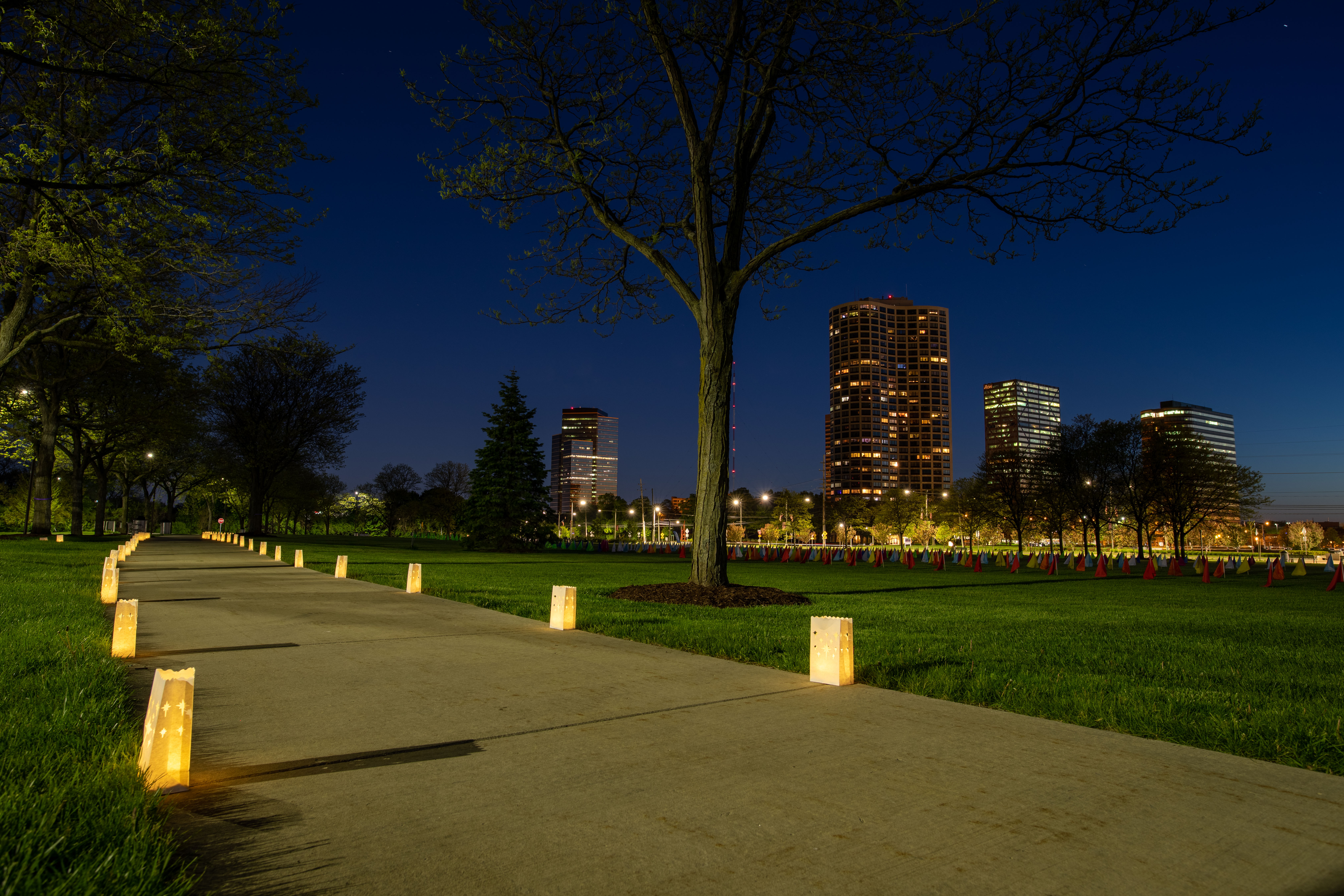
Candlelight Vigil on May 11, 2021

During June, July, August and September 2020, the signature monthly lunchtime concert Eat To The Beat events were broadcast virtually on their scheduled dates and featured two bands or artists recorded live, then broadcast through Facebook Live or on the City of Southfield's Cable 15 broadcast channel.

In June 2020, the featured artists were Angela Davis and Alise King & the Pure Nastiness Band, the latter recorded live at Aretha's Jazz Café in Detroit.

In July, the featured artists were Larry Lee & The Back In The Day Band, and Skye Island (with Mike Talley).

In August, the featured artists were Little Moses Jones and Cancel Monday.

In September, the featured artists were The Will Cyprian Experience and Larry Lee & The Back In The Day Band.

The city of Southfield held a Covid-19 memorial service and candlelight vigil on May 11, 2021 to honor the first responders and memorialize residents who lost their lives during the pandemic.

== See also ==
- Southfield Town Center
