= Southfield Pavilion =

Convention center in Michigan, United States

Coordinates: 42°28′52.7″N 83°14′17.6″W

The Southfield Pavilion is a convention center in Southfield, Michigan. It was built in 1978. The pavilion features 28,152 square feet (2,615 m^{2}) of space and can seat up to 2,000 for banquets, lectures and other special events. Adjacent are seven meeting rooms seating up to 250.

In 2023, a grant was approved from Oakland County to go towards renovations of the pavilion. The entire project was estimated to cost between $471,000 and $587,000.
