= Guardian Alarm =

Security company subsidiary

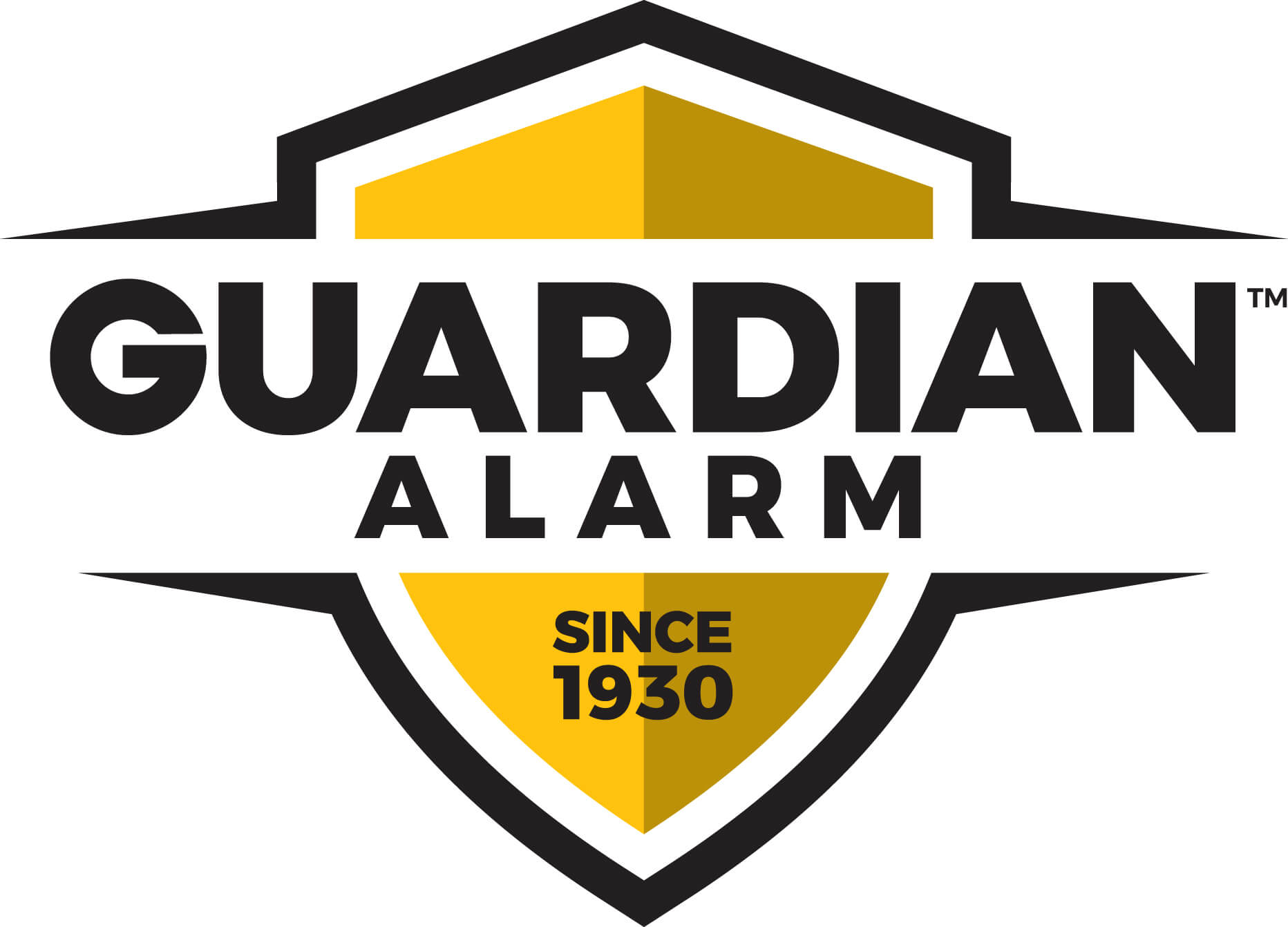
- Type: Subsidiary
- Industry: Home security
- Founded: 1930; 96 years ago
- Headquarters: Southfield, Michigan, United States
- Key people: Brent Uhl (CEO); Keith Patterson (COO)
- Products: Security systems, burglar alarm, fire alarm, motion detector, water detector, access control, video surveillance, home automation, building automation, closed-circuit television
- Owner: Certares L.P. and BlackRock
- Website: guardianalarm.com

Guardian Alarm is an American security company based in Southfield, Michigan. Founded in 1930, Guardian Alarm is the largest independently owned security company in the Midwest and continues to be ranked in the top 20 in the United States. The company has over 500 employees in various cities across the United States.

Guardian Alarm installs, monitors, and services home and business security systems. The company offers various security systems such as burglar alarm systems, 24/7 security monitoring, indoor and outdoor cameras, video surveillance, smart automation, access control systems, and fire, water, and carbon monoxide detection.

== History ==
In the 1920s, Guardian Alarm founder Milton Pierce designed and installed his first burglar alarm in his father's Detroit tailor shop and then went on to work for a local alarm company. In 1930, Pierce quickly went into business for himself when he purchased Guardian Alarm, then a fledgling company with only 60 customers.

In 1970, after the acquisition of an alarm company that also had a security guard division, Guardian Alarm launched Guardian Guard Services to customers in Michigan and Ohio. Guardian Guard provides both union and non-union security guards for facilities and special events, including Super Bowl XL at Ford Field in Detroit, MI.

Pierce's two sons, Douglas and Richard, each went on to start their own alarm companies, Automatic Alarm, and Certified Alarm, respectively. In 1975, the two merged their companies with Guardian Alarm. Guardian has continued to expand its customer base largely through purchasing smaller alarm and security companies.

In 1980, Guardian Alarm expanded into the cash-handling business with the formation of Guardian Armored Security, which grew into Michigan's largest armored car company with nearly 200 employees and annual revenue of almost $10 million.

In 2004, Guardian Alarm opened a division in Florida. As of today, the division is named Guardian Hawk Company.

In 2007, Guardian Alarm sold Guardian Armored Security to Loomis. The sale included three Michigan locations, including Flint, Grand Rapids, and Highland Park.

As of 2022, the company is owned by Certares LP and BlackRock, Inc.

== Products ==
- Security systems
- Burglar alarm
- Fire alarm
- Motion detector
- Water detector
- Access control
- Video surveillance
- Home automation
- Building automation
- Closed-circuit television
