= Southfield, Michigan =

- City
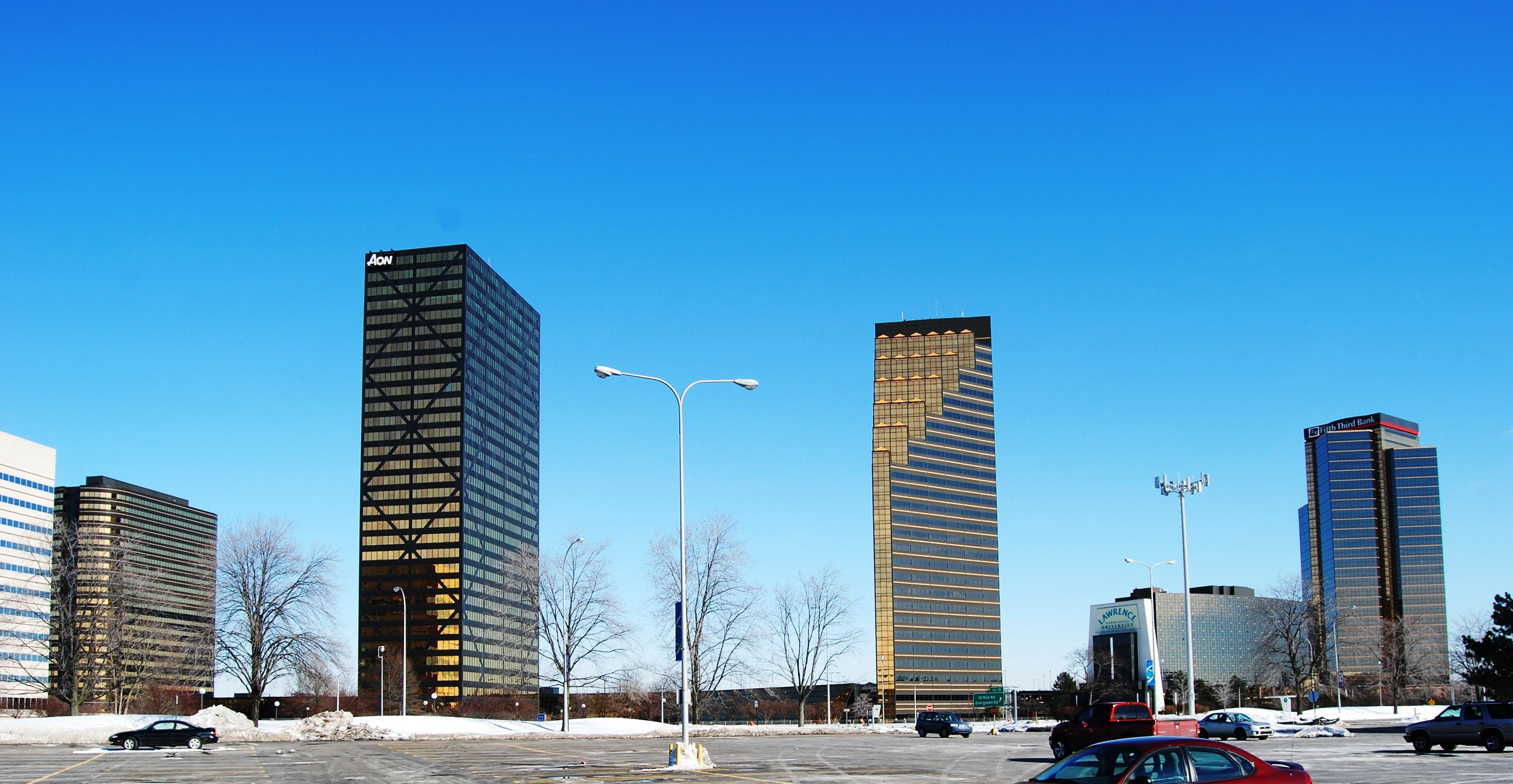
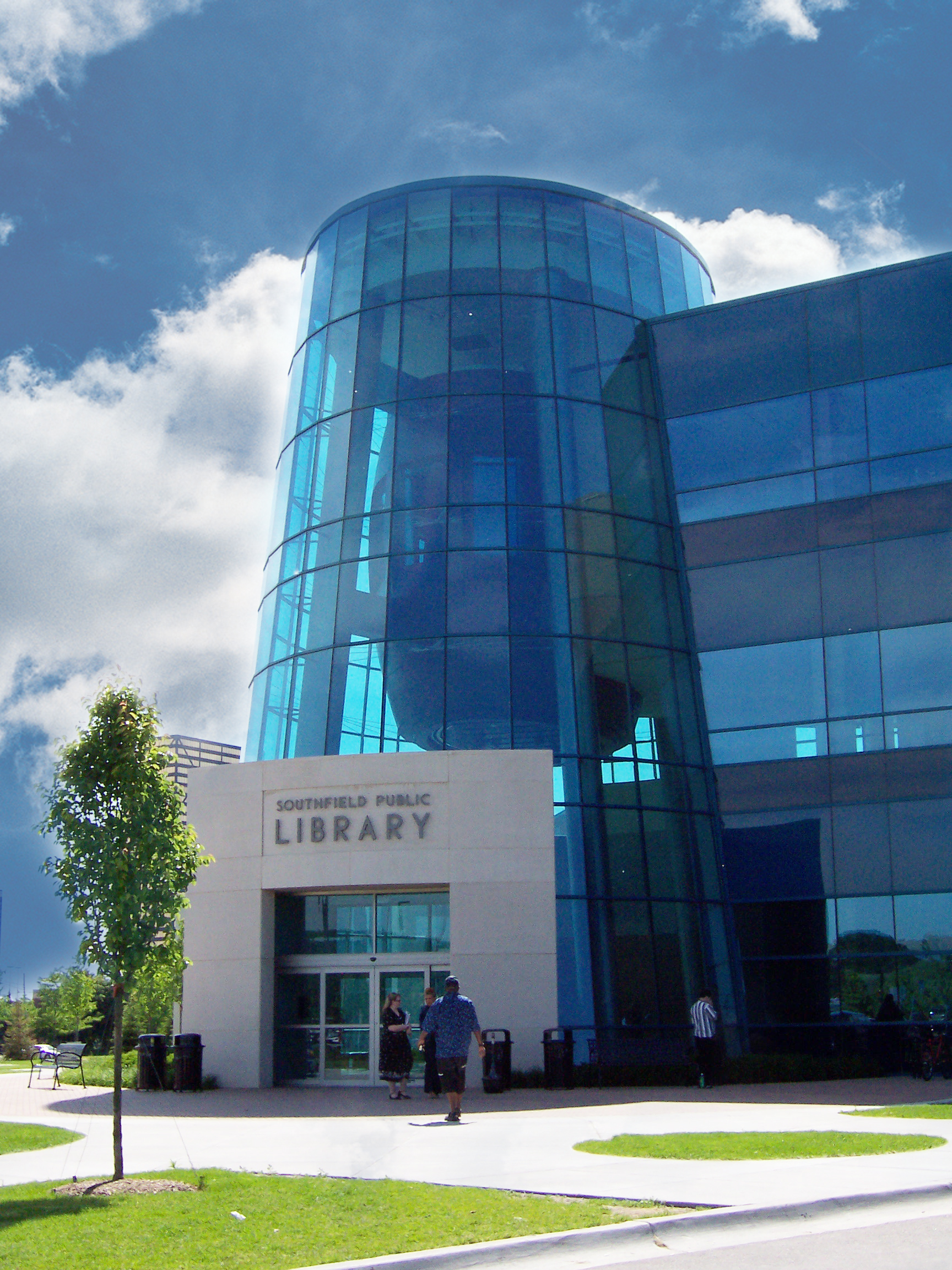
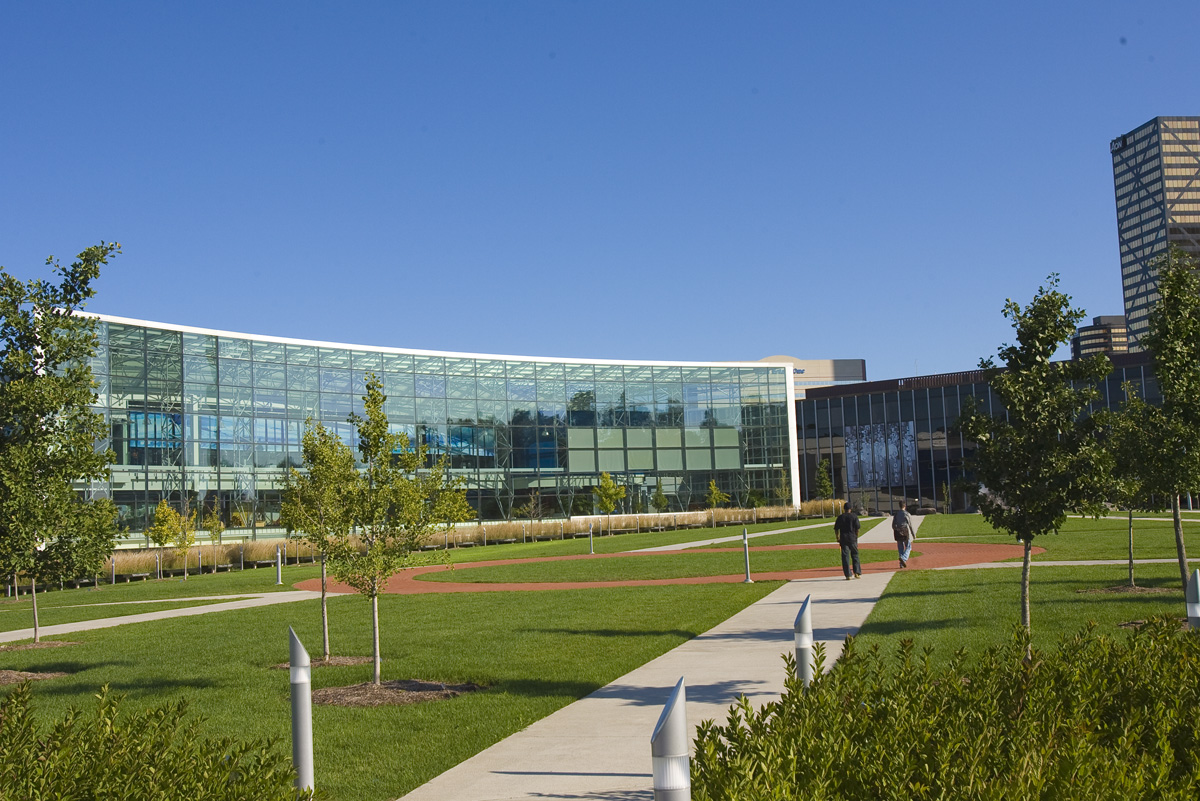
- Southfield Town Center Southfield Public Library Lawrence Technological University

- Flag Seal
- Nicknames: SFLD
- Motto: The Center of it All
- Interactive map of Southfield, Michigan
- Location within Michigan Location within the United States
- Coordinates: 42°28′47″N 83°14′42″W
- Country: United States
- State: Michigan
- County: Oakland
- Organized: 1830 (as Southfield Township)
- Incorporated: 1958

Government
  - Type: Mayor–council
  - Mayor: Kenson Siver (I)
  - Manager: Frederick Zorn

Area
  - City: 26.26 sq mi (68.01 km^{2})
  - Land: 26.25 sq mi (67.99 km^{2})
  - Water: 0.0039 sq mi (0.01 km^{2})
- Elevation: 682 ft (208 m)

Population (2020)
  - City: 76,618
  - Density: 2,918.5/sq mi (1,126.83/km^{2})
  - Metro: 4,296,250 (Metro Detroit)
- Time zone: UTC−5 (EST)
  - Summer (DST): UTC−4 (EDT)
- ZIP Codes: 48033–48034, 48037, 48075–48076, 48086
- Area codes: 248 and 947
- FIPS code: 26-74900
- GNIS feature ID: 0638439
- Website: Official website

Southfield is a city in Oakland County in the U.S. state of Michigan. An inner-ring suburb of Detroit, Southfield lies roughly 15 miles (24.1 km) northwest of downtown Detroit. The city had a population of 76,618 at the 2020 census.

Southfield home to multiple business districts, including the Southfield City Centre (an edge city which contains the tallest building in Detroit's suburbs) and the area surrounding the former Northland Center shopping mall. It is also home to Lawrence Technological University. The city was originally part of Southfield Township before incorporating in 1958. The autonomous city of Lathrup Village is an enclave within Southfield.

Southfield is also a historic center of Mid-century modern architecture in Michigan, with many examples being found across the city.

== History ==
Southfield was surveyed in 1817 according to the plan by Michigan territorial governor Lewis Cass. The first settlers came from nearby Birmingham and Royal Oak, Michigan, as well as New York and Vermont. The area that became Southfield was settled by John Daniels in 1823. Among the founders were the Heth, Stephens, Harmon, McClelland and Thompson families.

Town 1 north, 10 east was first organized as Ossewa Township on July 12, 1830, but the name was changed to Southfield Township 17 days later. The township took its name from its location in the "south fields" of Bloomfield Township. A US post office was established in 1833 and the first town hall built in 1873.

The Southfield Fire Department was formed on April 6, 1942, and the Southfield Police Department in 1953. In the 1950s, cities and villages began to incorporate within the township, including Lathrup Village in 1950, and Beverly Hills in 1957. Most of what was left of the township was formally incorporated as a city on April 28, 1958, to protect it from annexation attempts by the municipalities within it and especially by adjacent Detroit; whites who had migrated to the suburbs did not want to be associated with Detroit's expanding black community.

City Hall was built in 1964 as part of the new Civic Center complex, which also became home to Southfield's police headquarters. The Civic Center was expanded in 1971 to include a sports arena with swimming pool. Evergreen Hills Golf Course was added in 1972, and in 1978, a new public safety building, the Southfield Pavilion, and a new court building were added. In 2003, an expanded and redesigned Southfield Public Library opened to the public on the Civic Center grounds, featuring state-of-the-art facilities. Outside the Civic Center complex, Southfield has municipal parks and recreation facilities, largely developed in the 1970s, including Beech Woods Recreation Center and John Grace Community Center.

Duns Scotus College is now the home of Word of Faith Christian Center. In 2016, the site was the center of local controversy over a proposed oil drilling site. Due to sustained opposition and environmental concerns, the plan was cancelled.

== Geography ==
According to the United States Census Bureau, the city has an area of 26.28 square miles (68.06 km^{2}), of which 26.27 square miles (68.04 km^{2}) is land and 0.01 square miles (0.03 km^{2}) (0.04%) is water.

The main branch of the River Rouge runs through Southfield. The city is bounded to the south by Eight Mile Road, its western border is Inkster Road, and to the east it is bounded by Greenfield Road. Southfield's northern border does not follow a single road, but lies approximately along Thirteen Mile Road. The city is bordered by Detroit and Redford Township to the south, Farmington Hills to the west, Franklin, Bingham Farms, and Beverly Hills to the north and Royal Oak, Berkley and Oak Park to the east. The separate city of Lathrup Village sits as an enclave in the eastern part of the city, completely surrounded by Southfield.

== Demographics ==
Historical population
Census	Pop.	Note	%±
1960	31,531		—
1970	69,298		119.8%
1980	75,608		9.1%
1990	75,745		0.2%
2000	78,322		3.4%
2010	71,758		−8.4%
2020	76,618		6.8%
U.S. Decennial Census; 2010 2020

=== Racial and ethnic composition ===
Southfield city, Michigan – Racial and ethnic composition Note: the US Census treats Hispanic/Latino as an ethnic category. This table excludes Latinos from the racial categories and assigns them to a separate category. Hispanics/Latinos may be of any race.
Race / Ethnicity (NH = Non-Hispanic)	Pop 2000	Pop 2010	Pop 2020	% 2000	% 2010	% 2020
White alone (NH)	30,025	17,537	16,126	38.35%	24.45%	21.05%
Black or African American alone (NH)	42.259	50,181	53,713	53.97%	69.95%	70.10%
Native American or Alaska Native alone (NH)	147	135	132	0.19%	0.19%	0.17%
Asian alone (NH)	2,404	1,217	1,790	3.07%	1.70%	2.34%
Native Hawaiian or Pacific Islander alone (NH)	24	16	33	0.03%	0.02%	0.04%
Other race alone (NH)	309	154	535	0.39%	0.21%	0.70%
Mixed race or Multiracial (NH)	2,194	1,542	2,580	2.80%	2.15%	3.37%
Hispanic or Latino (any race)	934	957	1,709	1.19%	1.33%	2.23%
Total	78.296	71,739	76,618	100.00%	100.00%	100.00%

=== 2020 census ===
As of the 2020 census, Southfield had a population of 76,618. The median age was 44.0 years. 17.3% of residents were under the age of 18 and 22.4% of residents were 65 years of age or older. For every 100 females there were 80.3 males, and for every 100 females age 18 and over there were 76.7 males age 18 and over.

100.0% of residents lived in urban areas, while 0.0% lived in rural areas.

There were 34,911 households in Southfield, of which 21.6% had children under the age of 18 living in them. Of all households, 29.0% were married-couple households, 21.8% were households with a male householder and no spouse or partner present, and 44.3% were households with a female householder and no spouse or partner present. About 40.9% of all households were made up of individuals and 18.2% had someone living alone who was 65 years of age or older.

There were 37,650 housing units, of which 7.3% were vacant. The homeowner vacancy rate was 1.4% and the rental vacancy rate was 8.5%.

Racial composition as of the 2020 census
Race	Number	Percent
White	16,389	21.4%
Black or African American	53,984	70.5%
American Indian and Alaska Native	154	0.2%
Asian	1,810	2.4%
Native Hawaiian and Other Pacific Islander	35	0.0%
Some other race	999	1.3%
Two or more races	3,247	4.2%

=== 2010 census ===
As of the census of 2010, there were 71,739 people, 31,778 households, and 18,178 families residing in the city. The population density was 2,730.8 inhabitants per square mile (1,054.4/km^{2}). There were 35,986 housing units at an average density of 1,369.9 units per square mile (528.9 units/km^{2}). The racial makeup of the city was 70.3% African American, 24.9% White, 0.2% Native American, 1.7% Asian, 0.4% from other races, and 2.4% from two or more races. Hispanic or Latino of any race were 1.3% of the population.

There were 31,778 households, of which 26.7% had children under the age of 18 living with them, 33.5% were married couples living together, 19.4% had a female householder with no husband present, 4.4% had a male householder with no wife present, and 42.8% were non-families. 37.9% of all households were made up of individuals, and 13.7% had someone living alone who was 65 years of age or older. The average household size was 2.22 and the average family size was 2.96.

The median age in the city was 42. 20.5% of residents were under the age of 18; 8.5% were between the ages of 18 and 24; 24.7% were from 25 to 44; 29.2% were from 45 to 64; and 16.9% were 65 years of age or older. The gender makeup of the city was 44.7% male and 55.3% female.

=== 2000 census ===
As of the census of 2000, there were 78,296 people, 33,987 households, and 19,780 families residing in the city. The population density was 2,984.6 inhabitants per square mile (1,152.4/km^{2}). There were 35,698 housing units at an average density of 1,360.8 units per square mile (525.4 units/km^{2}). The racial makeup of the city was 54.22% African American, 38.83% White, 3.09% Asian, 0.20% Native American, 0.03% Pacific Islander, 0.64% from other races, and 2.99% from two or more races. 1.19% of the population were Hispanic or Latino of any race.

Of the city's 33,987 households, 25.3% had children under the age of 18 living with them, 40.2% were married couples living together, 14.3% had a female householder with no husband present, and 41.8% were non-families. 36.2% of all households were made up of individuals, and 11.9% had someone living alone who was 65 years of age or older. The average household size was 2.27 and the average family size was 3.01.

The age distribution in the city's population was spread out, with 21.6% under the age of 18, 7.9% from 18 to 24, 30.6% from 25 to 44, 24.8% from 45 to 64, and 15.2% who were 65 years of age or older. The median age was 38. For every 100 females there were 84.9 males. For every 100 females age 18 and over, there were 80.9 males.

The median income for a household in the city was $51,802, and the median income for a family was $64,543. Males had a median income of $48,341 versus $37,949 for females. The per capita income for the city was $28,096. About 5.8% of families and 7.4% of the population were below the poverty line, including 8.2% of those under age 18 and 10.2% of those age 65 or over.

=== Socioeconomic status ===
The most common occupations for people in Southfield are a mix of both white- and blue-collar jobs. Overall, Southfield is a city of sales and office workers, professionals and managers. A relatively large number of people living in Southfield work in office and administrative support (16.00%), sales jobs (10.93%), and management occupations (9.72%). Southfield's populace is very well-educated relative to most cities and towns in the nation. Whereas 21.84% of the average community's adult population holds a 4-year degree or higher, 38.73% of Southfield's adults have a bachelor's degree or advanced degree. Southfield's per capita income in 2010 was $28,995.

=== Ethnic groups ===
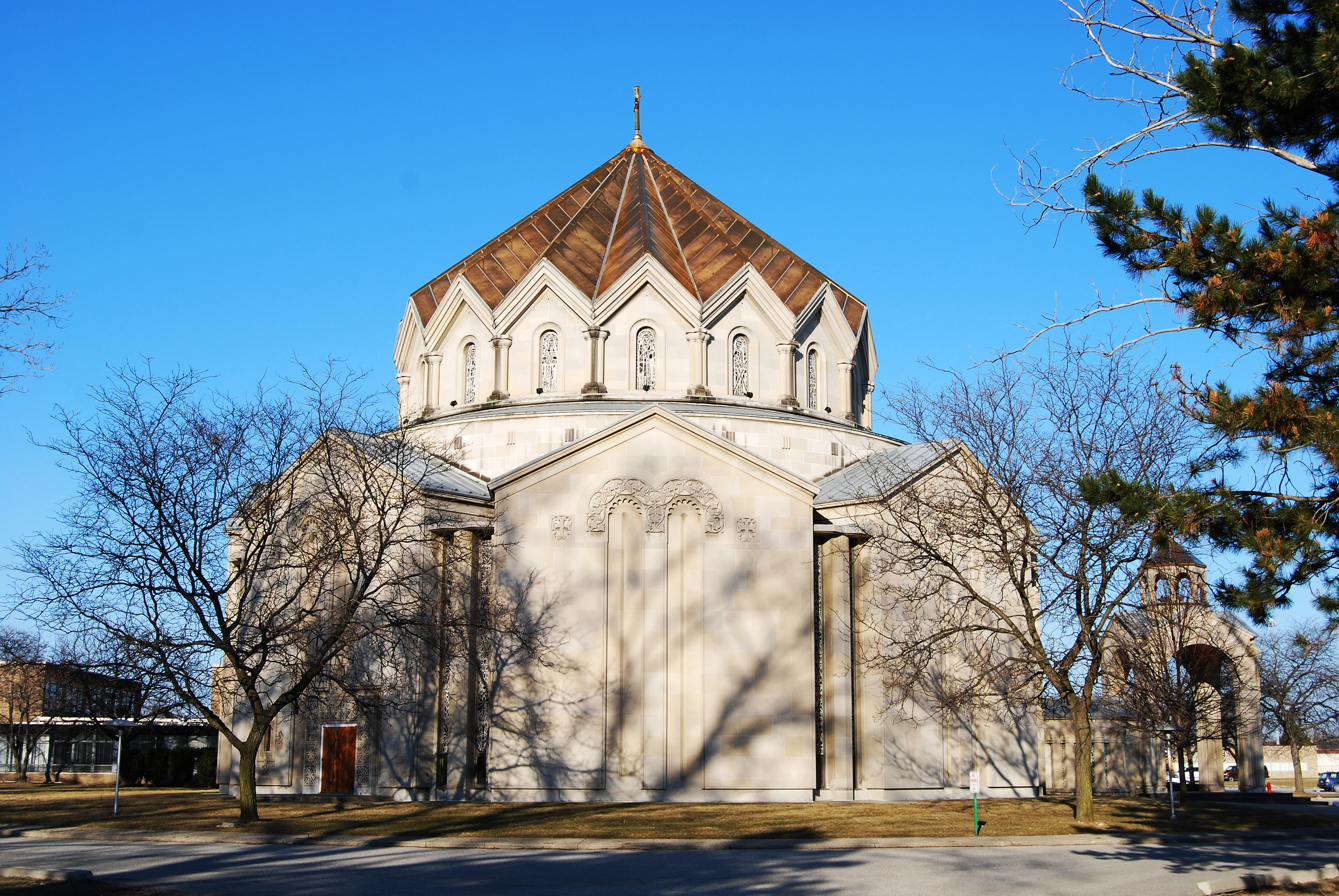
St. John Armenian Church in Southfield, founded by Alex Manoogian

In 2002 Southfield had 42,259 black people, the second-largest black population in Metro Detroit and third-largest in Michigan. As of 2011, many African Americans from Detroit were moving into Southfield and other suburbs of Oakland and Macomb counties. Tensions have occurred between existing middle-class blacks in Southfield and incoming Detroiters.

As of 2001 many Chaldo-Assyrians live in Southfield; they are descended from the ancient Nineveh region of the Assyrian homeland in North Iraq. The Chaldean Federation of America, an umbrella organization for most regional Chaldean groups, is in Southfield. As of that year, the largest Chaldean church, by number of congregants, was based here. The city also had the area's sole Chaldean retirement home. Southfield is also home to the Detroit area's Consulate-General of Iraq.

Since the rapid suburbanization of the 1950s and 1960s, many Jewish Americans from Northwest Detroit (particularly the Dexter-Davison neighborhood) moved to Southfield and other inner-ring suburbs such as Oak Park and Huntington Woods. Congregation Shaarey Zedek moved from Detroit to Southfield in 1962 to a modernist synagogue building designed by Percival Goodman. The city was also previously home to Congregation Beth Achim on 12 Mile Road until its merger with Congregation Adat Shalom. The building was later purchased and demolished by a Jewish day school. Though much of the Conservative and Reform Jewish population has since spread out to suburbs such as West Bloomfield and Farmington Hills, the city maintains a thriving Orthodox Jewish and Lubavitch community. It is also home to Farber Hebrew Day School – Yeshivat Akiva, a kosher grocery store, and many independent synagogues.

=== Religion ===
The Roman Catholic Archdiocese of Detroit formerly operated the Church of St. Bede. By 2013 there was a debate on how the property should be rezoned, and therefore reused.

Jewish places of worship in Southfield include Congregation Shaarey Zedek, Ahavas Olam, Congregation Yagdil Torah, Young Israel of Southfield, Congregation Beth Tefilo Emanuel Tikvah, Ahavas Yisrael Society, Congregation Shomrey Emunah, and the F.R.E.E. Russian Jewry Center.

== Economy ==
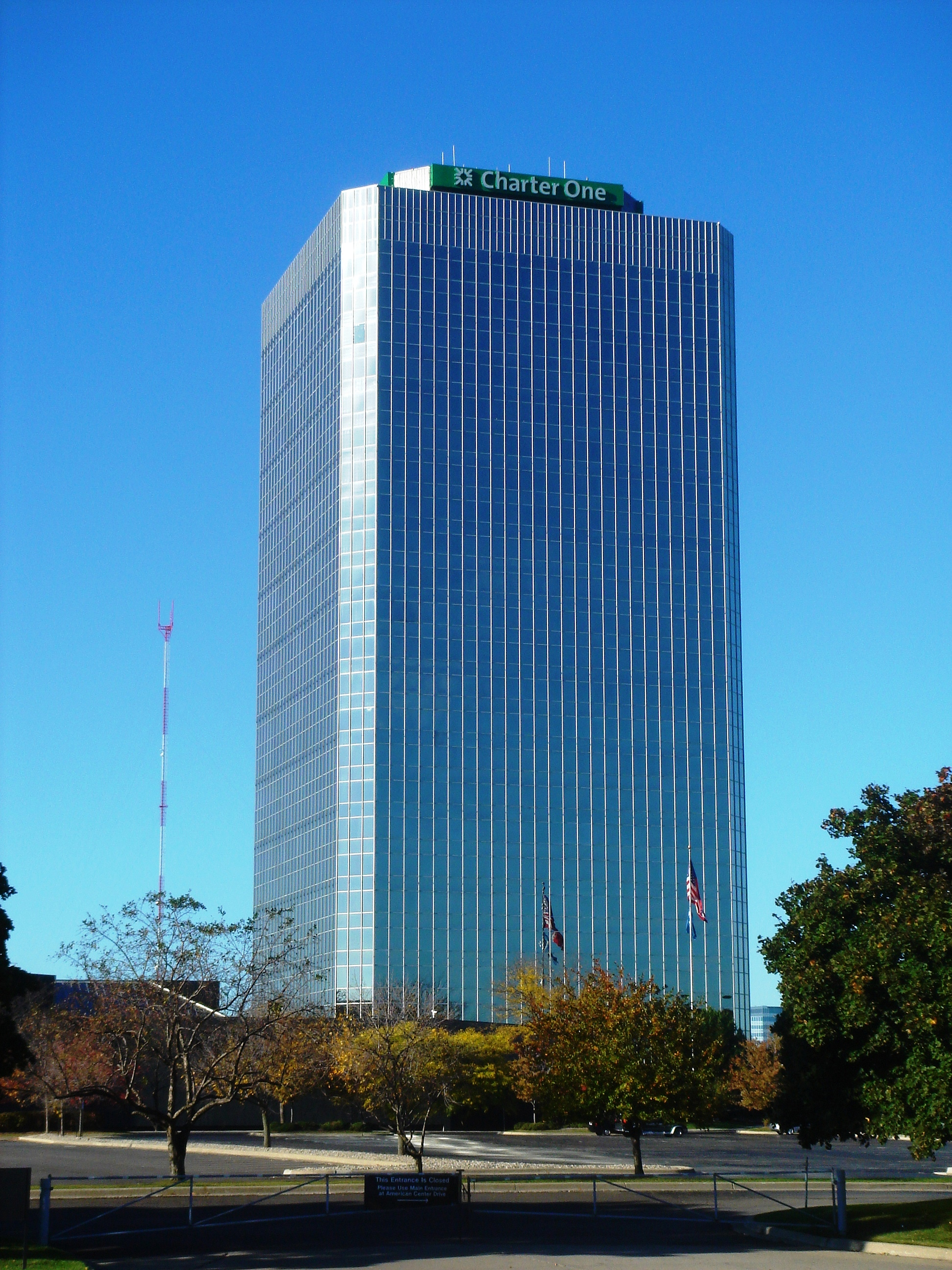
American Center

Southfield is a commercial and business center for the metropolitan Detroit area, with 27,000,000 square feet (2,508,400 m^{2}) of office space, second in the Detroit metro area to Detroit's central business district of 33,251,000 square feet (3,089,100 square meters). Several internationally recognized corporations have major offices and headquarters in Southfield, including Veoneer, Huf Hülsbeck and Fürst, Denso, Peterson Spring, Federal-Mogul, Lear, R.L. Polk & Co., International Automotive Components, Stefanini, Inc., and Guardian Alarm. More than 100 Fortune 500 companies have offices in Southfield.

Prominent in Southfield is Southfield City Centre, a mixed-use area consisting of a major business center, private university, and residential neighborhoods, near the intersection of Interstate 696 (I-696, Walter P. Reuther Freeway) and the M-10 (Lodge Freeway). Southfield City Centre was created in 1992 as a special assessment district, and was originally planned to improve pedestrian amenities and facilitate economic development.

On October 28, 2014, Fifth Third Bank announced plans to move its Michigan regional headquarters from Southfield to downtown Detroit in what will be named the Fifth Third Bank Building at One Woodward. The office had 150 employees.

Northland Center, one of the nation's first shopping malls, opened in Southfield in 1954 and closed in 2015. As of 2022, the property is being redeveloped as a mixed-use residential and commercial complex. Southfield is home to over 780 acres (3.2 km^{2}) of parkland and a nationally recognized public school district.

The Consulate of Macedonia in Detroit and Consulate of Lebanon in Detroit are located in the Southfield Town Center, and the Consulate of Iraq in Detroit is in Southfield.

== Arts and culture ==
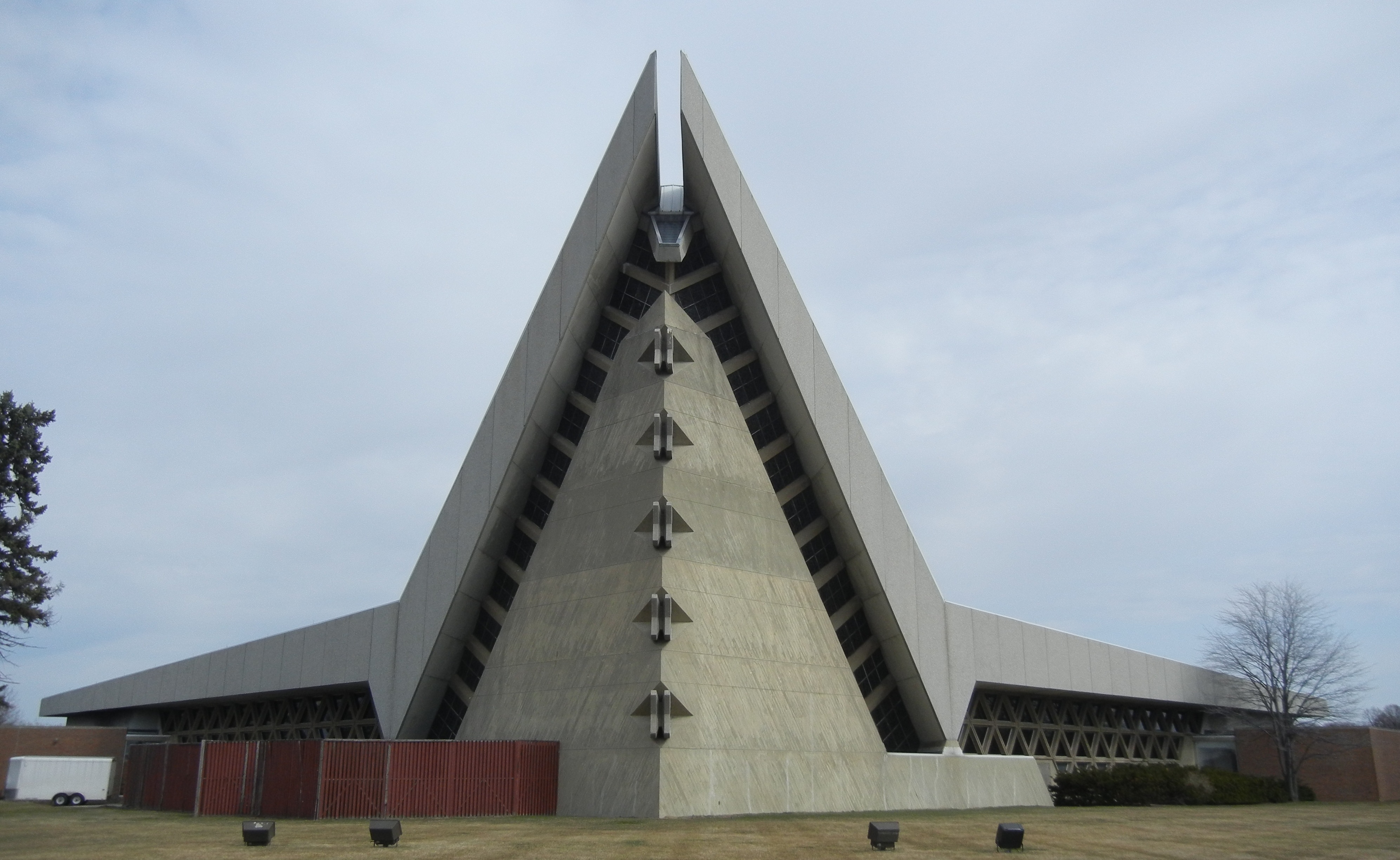
Congregation Shaarey Zedek, designed by Percival Goodman, opened in 1962.

Southfield has various Mid-century modern style architecture buildings including Percival Goodman's brutalist Congregation Shaarey Zedek and many early works by Minoru Yamasaki, including his Reynolds Aluminum building.

Penguicon has been held in Southfield regularly since 2014.

== Parks and recreation ==
The Southfield Parks and Recreation Department is responsible for 775 acres of parks, nature preserves and open space and historic properties at 33 sites within the city. There are numerous ball fields, tennis and handball courts, picnic areas and shelters. There are soccer fields, play lots and sand volleyball courts throughout the city.

- Bauervic Woods Park
- Bedford Woods Park
- Beech Woods Park
- Brace Park
- Burgh Historical Park
- Carpenter Lake Nature Preserve
- Civic Center Park
- Freeway Park
- Inglenook Park
- John Grace Park & Community Center
- John R. Miller Park
- Lahser Woods Park
- Lincoln Woods
- Mary Thompson House & Farm
- Pebble Creek Park
- Simms Park
- Stratford Woods Commons
- Valley Woods Nature Preserve

== Government ==
Southfield uses the council-manager form of government, and thus is governed by a City Council consisting of seven council members. The city council appoints a City Administrator, who manages the day-to-day operations of the city. The popularly elected mayor, who does not vote on council actions, has the right to veto council actions and appoints the city's planner, assessor, attorney, and members of various commissions. The city's clerk and treasurer are also popularly elected officials. All these officials hold nonpartisan positions.

=== Federal, state, and county legislators ===
United States House of Representatives
District	Representative	Party	Since
12th	Rashida Tlaib	Democratic	2023

Michigan Senate
District	Senator	Party	Since
7th	Jeremy Moss	Democratic	2019 (Note: Moss has represented Southfield since 2019, but has only represented the 7th district since 2023.)

Michigan House of Representatives
District	Representative	Party	Since
5th	Natalie Price	Democratic	2023
18th	Jason Hoskins	Democratic	2023
19th	Samantha Steckloff	Democratic	2023

Oakland County Board of Commissioners
District	Commissioner	Party	Since
17	Yolanda Smith Charles	Democratic	2023
18	Linnie Taylor	Democratic	2023

== Education ==
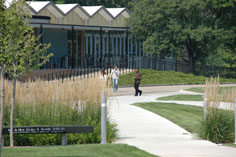
Lawrence Technological University campus

Southfield Public Schools operates area public schools. Southfield Senior High School for the Arts and Technology (commonly known as Southfield A&T) is the district's sole high school. There were originally two high schools in the district, Southfield and Southfield-Lathrup, but they were consolidated after the 2015–16 school year. Students living in parts of Northern Southfield attend schools in the Birmingham City School District, while students living in the southeast corner of Southfield attend schools in the Oak Park School District. Southfield A&T also competes in the Oakland Activities Association in the Red Division for high school sports, and has membership in the MHSAA.

AGBU Alex and Marie Manoogian School is an Armenian charter school in Southfield. Farber Hebrew Day School – Yeshivat Akiva and Southfield Christian School are private schools in the city.

Southfield Public Library operates public libraries in the city.Providence Medical Center offers residency training in various fields of medicine.

Southfield is home to Lawrence Technological University and Oakland Community College. The Specs Howard School of Media Arts is in also Southfield.

== Media ==
Southfield is the broadcast media center for the Detroit area, with studios and broadcast facilities for several television stations, including WXYZ-TV, WJBK, WKBD-TV, WMYD-TV, WWJ-TV, and City Cable 15. Metro Detroit's regional sports network Bally Sports Detroit is in Southfield on 11 Mile and Evergreen roads. A transmitter for WDIV-TV is in the city; it is the only television station based in downtown Detroit.

The city is home to Audacy's Detroit studios. Southfield is also served by WSHJ 88.3 FM, a student-run radio station sponsored by Southfield Public Schools.

In 1970, radio pioneer and entertainer Specs Howard founded the Specs Howard School of Media Arts in Southfield.

In addition to The Detroit News and Free Press, Detroit's two metropolitan daily newspapers, Southfield is served by the Southfield Eccentric, a suburban paper that reports on local and community events, which is published twice a week, on Sunday and Thursday. The headquarters of The Detroit Jewish News is in Southfield. The Chaldean News is also headquartered in Southfield.

== Transportation ==
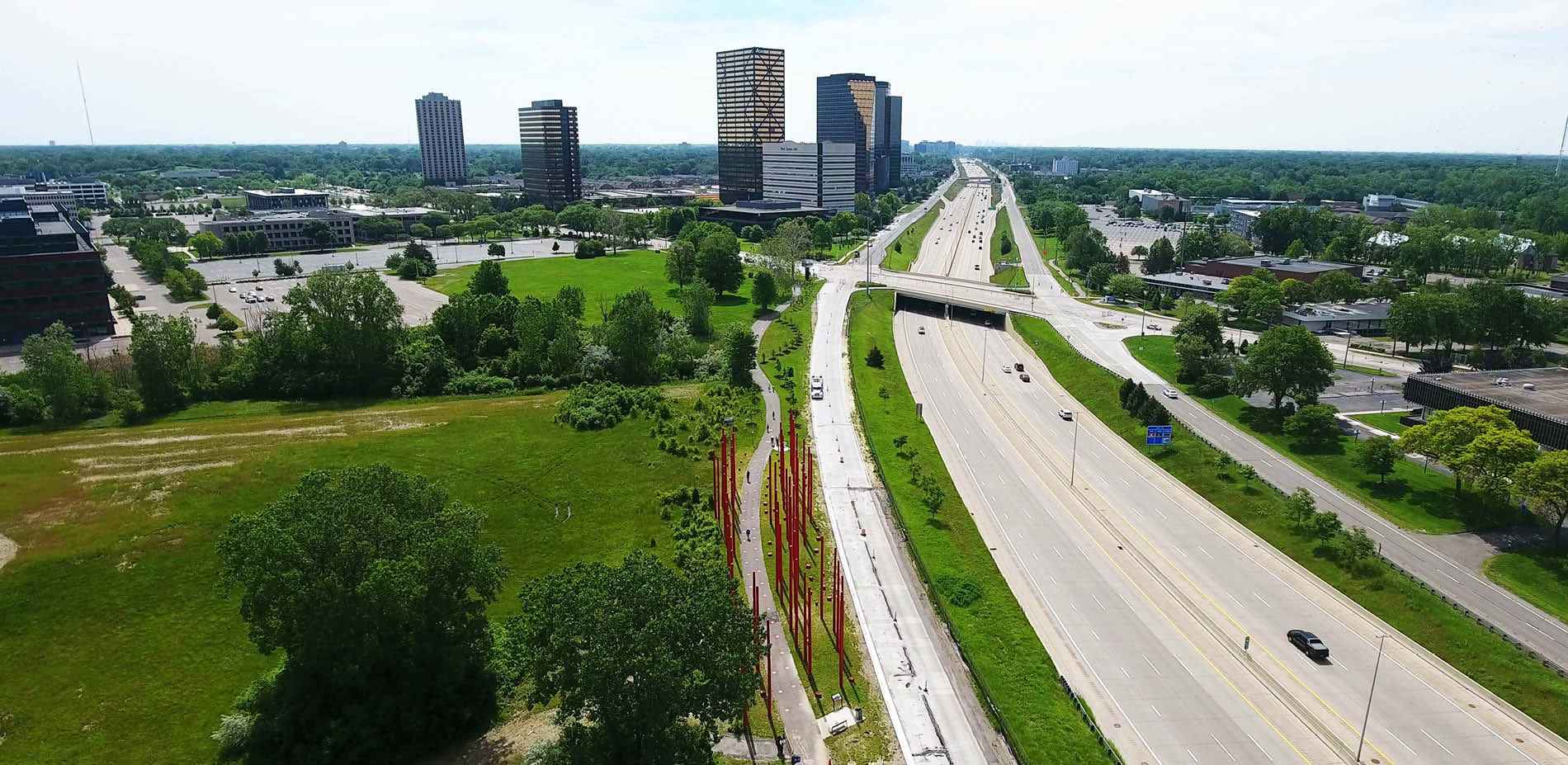
Aerial view of the Southfield City Centre Trail

Suburban Mobility Authority for Regional Transportation (SMART) operates local and regional bus transit. The major thoroughfares in the city include the John C. Lodge Freeway (M-10), which is among the first urban to suburban highways constructed in the United States. The city also contains I-696, Southfield Freeway (M-39), and US 24 (Telegraph Road). The city has several freeway interchanges connecting local roads to the freeways. Most prominently, "The Lodge" freeway connects downtown Detroit to "The Mixing Bowl," the sprawling interchange of I-696, US 24, M-10, Lahser Road, and Franklin Road, all of which are in Southfield.

Most major streets adhere to a north–south/east–west orientation, forming a grid of major streets spaced one mile (1.6 km) apart from each other. The major east–west streets are 8 Mile Road (which forms the southern boundary of the city), 9 Mile Road, 10 Mile Road, 11 Mile Road (which is split by the Lodge and Telegraph), and 12 Mile Road. Major north–south streets are Telegraph Road, Lahser Road, Evergreen Road, Southfield Road (the northern extension of the Southfield Freeway) and Greenfield Road (which forms the eastern boundary of the city).

== Notable people ==
- Jay Adelson, entrepreneur
- Fatai Alashe, soccer player
- Ingrid Andress, country singer-songwriter (born in Southfield, Michigan)
- Johnathon Banks, boxer
- Tom Barrett, U.S. representative for Michigan
- Jeff Blashill, professional ice hockey head coach
- Selma Blair, actress
- Harry J. Brooks (1902-1927), test pilot
- Jimmy Carson, professional hockey player
- Mike Chappell, professional basketball player
- Elijah Connor, singer
- Emilia Cundari, soprano
- Billy Davis, musician currently living in Southfield
- Erin Dilly, actress raised in Southfield
- Glenn Earl, professional football player
- Geoffrey Fieger, attorney for Jack Kevorkian based in Southfield
- Susie Garrett (1929-2002), actress
- Chris Getz, professional baseball player
- Nicole Gibbons, TV personality
- Dan Gilbert, businessman raised in Southfield
- Jon Glaser, actor raised in Southfield
- GRiZ, American DJ and electronic producer
- Yasmine Hanani, actress
- Carla Harvey, musician
- Thomas Hearns, retired boxer living in Southfield
- John James, politician
- I Prevail, metal band from Southfield
- Ben Kelso, professional basketball player
- Keegan-Michael Key, actor
- Byron Krieger (1920-2015), Olympic fencer
- Tony Leech, director, screenwriter, editor
- Eric Lefkofsky, businessman
- Viola Liuzzo, civil rights activist (assassinated, March 1965)
- Raynetta Mañees, novelist, entertainer
- Devyn Marble (born 1992), basketball player for Maccabi Haifa of the Israeli Basketball Premier League
- Howard Markel, medical historian
- Roya Megnot (1962-2009), actress
- Jeremy Moss, politician
- Colette Nelson, body builder
- Chukwuma Okorafor, professional football player
- Lawrence Payton (1938-1997), musician
- Matt Pike, musician
- Steven Pitt (1959-2018), American forensic psychiatrist
- Mike Posner, singer-songwriter
- Bill Prady, television writer raised in Southfield
- Emily Samuelson, ice dancer
- Debbie Schlussel, film critic
- Jay Sebring (1933-1969), celebrity hair stylist and victim of the Manson Family
- Jason Stollsteimer, musician
- Jennifer Laura Thompson, actress
- Malaya Watson, singer
- Rick Worthy, actor
- Sheldon Yellen, entrepreneur

== See also ==
- Architecture of metropolitan Detroit
- Lawrence Technological University
- Metro Detroit
- Tourism in metropolitan Detroit
- History of the African-Americans in Metro Detroit
- Specs Howard School of Media Arts
