= Southfield Public Library =

Public library in Southfield, Michigan

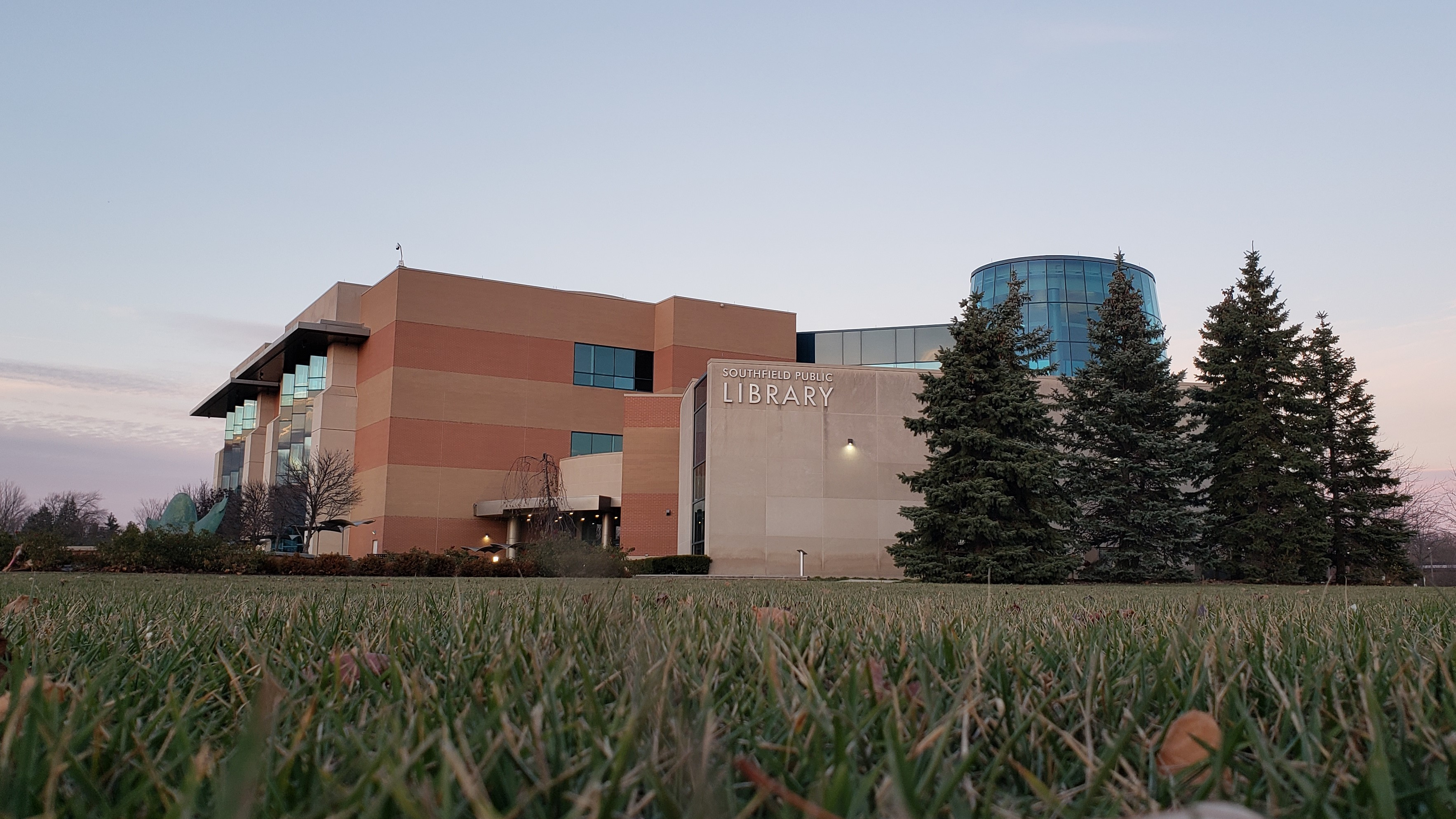
- 42.4827°N 83.2401°W
- Location: 26300 Evergreen Road Southfield, Michigan, United States
- Established: 1844

Collection
- Size: 280,000 volumes

Access and use
- Population served: 82,000

Other information
- Director: Mary Beall
- Website: www.southfieldlibrary.org

The Southfield Public Library is a public library in Southfield, Michigan. The library serves the communities of Southfield and Lathrup Village.

== History ==
Library services began for the people living in the Township of Southfield in 1844. The services proved so popular that by 1845, Township rules were adopted for the Southfield Township Library. The early Library system relied heavily on school districts. Every three months, the Township librarian took a rotating collection of books to each school.

In the 1950s, a group of citizens began a campaign for a public library in the newly formed City of Southfield. This group eventually became known as the Friends of the Southfield Public Library. Their efforts were successful, and on February 3, 1960 the first Southfield Public Library opened its doors in a renovated two-room school house.

It quickly became apparent that the Library would need a new building in order to keep up with the rapid growth and vitality of the new City of Southfield. In 1964, the Library moved to a new building in the Southfield Civic Center complex. The 1960s and 1970s were years of continued growth for the City of Southfield and its Library. To keep pace with the City's expansion, an enlarged and renovated Southfield Public Library was made available to the community in 1980.

In 1999, Southfield voters approved a millage increase to build and operate a new library building. The new Southfield Public Library opened on June 15, 2003.

On May 3, 2011 Southfield voters approved a millage for police and fire protection, library operations, street maintenance and parks and recreation programming. The millage was passed with over 83% of the vote.

On September 4, 2012, the library began shortened hours due to property tax revenue decreases.

During the COVID 19 pandemic the library shifted its focus to online offerings as the building was closed. Services were gradually brought back and as of 2022 the hours are expanded to full hours.

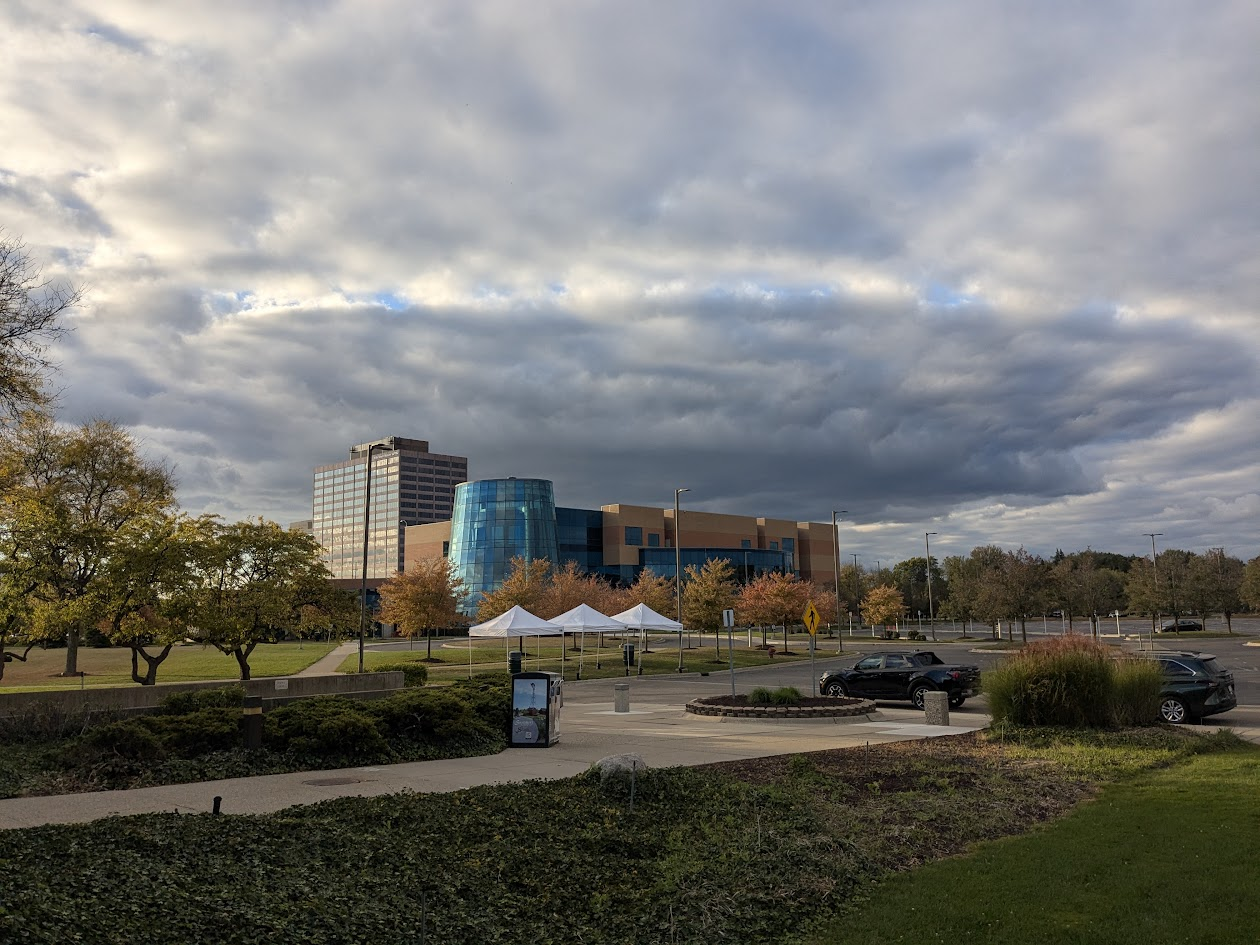
Southfield Public seen from the east.

== Services & collections ==
Southfield Public Library provides a book collection of over 280,000 volumes and subscribes to numerous print magazines and newspapers. Large print titles as well as video magnifiers and computer enhancements are available for individuals with limited vision.

A Small Business StartUp Center provides resources for small businesses and non-profits.

The Southfield Public Library also offers a collection of audio books, DVDs, videocassettes, music CDs, electronic books and downloadable audio books for users.

The Library offers numerous public computers in addition to wireless access throughout the building. Public computers offer free access to the Library catalog, research sources and the Internet. Hands-on computer classes in two computer labs give participants assistance with the basics of the Internet, email and popular software.

The Southfield Public Library hosts numerous educational and informational programs and exhibits. Regular programs are story times, Summer Reading program, Jazz & Blues @ Your Library, book discussions, author events and more special programs. The library also has four different exhibit areas with rotating exhibits.

== Art collection ==
The Library is home to numerous artworks. Many were relocated from the city's former Northland Center shopping mall following its closure in 2015.

- Mark Twain Bench by Gary Lee Price Studios
- Boy and Bear, bronze sculpture by Marshall Fredericks
- Two Bears, bronze sculpture by Marshall Fredericks
- Martin Luther King Jr. bust by James Spearman
- Journeys of the Imagination by Gary Lee Price Studios
- Seasons of the Imagination, tiles by Laurie Eisenhardt
- Birdhouses from Maine by Naturally Wood
- Book sculpture and Butterfly Bench
- Wind Blowing by Jerry Pinkney
- Sophie and Rose by Wendy Anderson Halperin
- Bedtime Stories by Jane Dyer
- Brown Honey in Broomwheat Tea by Floyd Cooper
- The Voyage Begins by Anthony Bacon Venti
- Dave the Potter by Bryan Collier
- Cat in the Hat by David McKnight, Emerald City Designs
- Dr. Seuss sculptures: The Tufted Gustard, Two Horned Drouberhannis, Andulovian Grackler, Blue-Green Abelard, Seuss Sawfish, Mulberry Street Unicorn, Semi-Normal Green Lidded Fawn, Flaming Herring, Carbonic Walrus, Gimlet Fish, Sea Going Dilemma Fish, Powerless Puffer and Sludge Tarpon
- Dr. Seuss prints: Singing Cats; Oh, the Places You’ll Go; Fox in Socks; A Plethora of Fish; Oh, The Stuff You Will Learn
- Book Quilt by the staff of the Southfield Public Library
- Twist Sculpture by Rollin Karg Glass Studio
- Les Fleurs de Babylone Art Quilt by Joy Saville
- Transformation Art Glass by Janet Kelman
- Still Water Reflections Fiber Wall Piece by Tim Harding
