= Hertel =

Hertel is a German surname. Notable people with the name include:

- Aage Hertel (1873–1944), Danish actor
- Benedikt Hertel (born 1996), German bobsledder
- Curtis Hertel (1953–2016), U.S. politician from Michigan
- Curtis Hertel Jr. (born 1978), U.S. politician from Michigan
- Dennis Hertel (born 1948), U.S. Representative from Michigan
- Eberhard Hertel (1938–2024), German singer
- Hannes Hertel (born 1939), German botanist and taxonomist
- Heinrich Hertel (1902–1982), German engineer
- Jean-Baptiste Hertel de Rouville (1668–1722), seigneur and military officer of New France
- Jean-Baptiste-René Hertel de Rouville (1789–1859), seigneur of New France, son of Jean-Baptiste-Melchior
- Jean-Baptiste-Melchior Hertel de Rouville (1748–1817), seigneur of New France, grandson of Jean-Baptiste
- Johann Christian Hertel (1697–1754), German musician
- Johann Wilhelm Hertel (1727–1789), German musician
- Johannes Hertel (1872–1955), Indologist
- John C. Hertel (born 1946), U.S. politician from Michigan
- Kevin Hertel (born 1985), U.S. politician from Michigan
- Paul Hertel (born 1953), Austrian composer
- Peter Ludwig Hertel (1817–1899), German ballet music composer
- Stefanie Hertel (born 1979), German singer
- Thomas Hertel (1951–2024), German composer
