= Representative Hertel =

Representative Hertel may refer to numerous representatives.

- Curtis Hertel (1953–2016), Michigan state representative
- Curtis Hertel Jr. (born 1978), Michigan state representative
- Dennis Hertel (born 1948), U.S. Representative from Michigan
- Kevin Hertel (born 1985), Michigan state representative
