= Johann Hertel =

Johann Hertel may refer to one of these persons:

- Johann Christian Hertel (1697 or 1699 - 1754), German composer, virtuoso performer
- Johann Wilhelm Hertel (1727 – 1789), German composer, harpsichord player

== See also ==
- Johannes Hertel (1872 – 1955), German Indologist
- John Hertel (born. 1946), Detroit politician
