= Senator Hertel =

Senator Hertel may refer to:

- Curtis Hertel Jr. (born 1978), Michigan State Senate
- John C. Hertel (born 1946), Michigan State Senate
- Kevin Hertel (born 1985), Michigan State Senate
