= Senator Sheldon =

Senator Sheldon may refer to:

- George L. Sheldon (1870–1960), Nebraska State Senate
- Herbert Franklin Sheldon (1831–1917), Kansas State Senate
- Suel A. Sheldon (1850–1926), Michigan State Senate
- Tim Sheldon (born 1947), Washington State Senate

== See also ==
- Carlos D. Shelden (1840–1904), Michigan State Senate
- Amanda Shelton (born 1990), Senate of Guam
