= Malik McDowell =

American football player (born 1996)

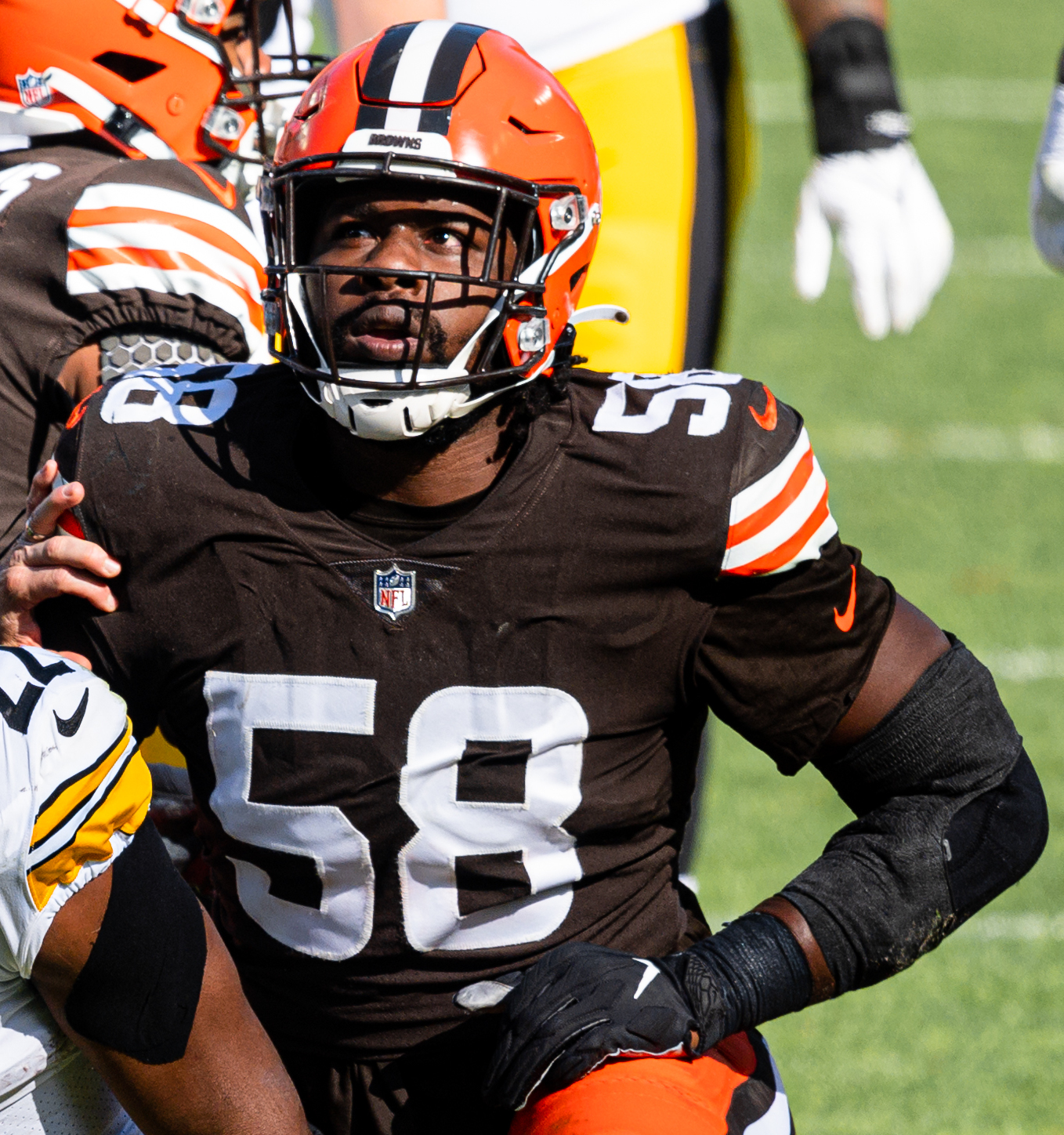
- McDowell with the Cleveland Browns in 2021

Profile
- Position: Defensive tackle

Personal information
- Born: June 20, 1996 (age 30); Detroit, Michigan, U.S.
- Listed height: 6 ft 6 in (1.98 m)
- Listed weight: 295 lb (134 kg)

Career information
- High school: Southfield (Southfield, Michigan)
- College: Michigan State (2014–2016)
- NFL draft: 2017: 2nd round, 35th overall pick

Career history
- Seattle Seahawks (2017–2018); Cleveland Browns (2021); Duke City Gladiators (2023–2024)

Awards and highlights
- Freshman All-American (2014); 2× Second-team All-Big Ten (2015, 2016)

Career NFL statistics
- Total tackles: 33
- Sacks: 3.0
- Fumble recoveries: 1
- Pass deflections: 1
- Stats at Pro Football Reference

Malik Devon McDowell (born June 20, 1996) is an American professional football defensive tackle. After playing college football for Michigan State, he was selected by the Seattle Seahawks in the second round of the 2017 NFL draft. He sustained injuries from an all-terrain vehicle (ATV) accident shortly after being drafted and never played in a game for the Seahawks. His career was further complicated by a legal issue which ultimately resulted in him being sentenced to prison for 11 months in November 2019. In 2021, McDowell returned to the NFL and played for the Cleveland Browns that year.

== Early life ==
McDowell attended Loyola High School in Detroit, Michigan, and then Southfield High School in Southfield, Michigan. As a high school football player, he was rated by Rivals.com as a five-star recruit, and was ranked as the second best defensive end in his class and the 26th best player overall. He committed to play football at Michigan State University.

== College career ==
McDowell played college football at Michigan State under head coach Mark Dantonio. In the 2014 season, McDowell played in all 13 games as a true freshman and had 15 tackles and 1.5 sacks. As a sophomore in 2015, he was named an All-American by Fox Sports. On November 29, 2016, McDowell was named Second-team All-Big Ten Conference. On December 5, 2016, McDowell announced that he had signed with an agent and would enter the 2017 NFL draft.

== Professional career ==
McDowell received an invitation to the NFL Combine and completed every combine drill, except for the short shuttle and three-cone drill. He also participated at Michigan State's Pro Day, but chose to run only positional drills for scouts and team representatives in attendance. McDowell attended nine private workouts and visits with the Baltimore Ravens, Dallas Cowboys, Detroit Lions, Indianapolis Colts, Miami Dolphins, Minnesota Vikings, Philadelphia Eagles, Seattle Seahawks, and Washington Redskins. NFL draft experts and analysts projected McDowell to be a first round pick. He was ranked the top defensive tackle available in the draft by ESPN and NFL analyst Bucky Brooks, the second best defensive tackle by Sports Illustrated and Pro Football Focus, and was ranked the third best interior defensive lineman by NFL media analyst Mike Mayock.

Pre-draft measurables
Height	Weight	Arm length	Hand span	40-yard dash	10-yard split	20-yard split	20-yard shuttle	Three-cone drill	Vertical jump	Broad jump	Bench press
6 ft 6 1/4 in (1.99 m)	295 lb (134 kg)	34 3/4 in (0.88 m)	10 1/2 in (0.27 m)	4.85 s	1.69 s	2.84 s	4.53 s	7.69 s	28.5 in (0.72 m)	9 ft 4 in (2.84 m)	23 reps
All values from NFL Combine

=== Seattle Seahawks ===
The Seattle Seahawks selected McDowell in the second round (35th overall) of the 2017 NFL draft. On May 25, 2017, the Seahawks signed McDowell to a four-year, $6.95 million contract with $4.40 million guaranteed and a signing bonus of $3.19 million.

A few weeks prior to training camp, McDowell was involved in an ATV accident and was placed on the reserve/did not report list on July 30, 2017. He later returned to practice and was placed on the non-football injury list on August 3 due to the injuries from the accident. He was arrested for driving under the influence of alcohol on September 22, 2017, and was sentenced to 12 months of probation on March 20, 2018. He was arrested again in December 2017 for disorderly conduct.

On July 26, 2018, McDowell was waived by the Seahawks with a non-football injury designation, and subsequently placed on the reserve/non-football injury list the next day.

On February 18, 2019, McDowell got into an altercation with police in Lathrup Village, Michigan, and was charged with assault, resisting arrest, and operating a vehicle while intoxicated (OVI). During the incident and while resisting arrest, McDowell constantly and for several minutes shouted demands for seeing the police officers' "supervisor." He was released by the Seahawks on March 2, 2019. In April 2019, he was arrested for receiving and concealing stolen property after police found a stolen car in his possession. The Seahawks filed a lawsuit against him in May 2019, after he failed to repay $799,238 of his signing bonus. McDowell was suspended for the first two weeks of the 2019 NFL season as a result of the February 2019 incident on July 12, 2019. He was reinstated from suspension on September 17, 2019. On October 23, 2019, he pleaded guilty to all of the criminal charges. He was sentenced to 11 months in prison on November 13, 2019. His agent said in May 2020 that he was medically cleared to return to football, and McDowell worked out for the Dolphins on October 21, 2020. In March 2021, his agent said he was looking to return to the NFL.

=== Cleveland Browns ===
McDowell signed with the Cleveland Browns on May 3, 2021.

=== Duke City Gladiators ===
On June 16, 2023, McDowell signed with the Duke City Gladiators of the Indoor Football League. He was released on May 24, 2024.

== Legal issues ==
On January 17, 2022, McDowell was arrested in Deerfield Beach, Florida, and charged with public exposure, assaulting a police officer, and resisting arrest, after police received a call about a man walking naked on the property of a learning center for children. The Cleveland Browns released a statement indicating they were investigating the matter.
