= Southfield-Lathrup High School =

Location
- 19301 West Twelve Mile Road; Southfield, Michigan; United States; 42.5°N 83.235°W

Information
- Type: Public school
- Established: 1967
- Closed: 2016
- School district: Southfield Public Schools
- Grades: 9–12
- Colors: Red and White
- Mascot: The Chargers
- Yearbook: The Synthesis

Southfield-Lathrup High School was a senior high school in Lathrup Village, Michigan, United States. It was the second oldest of three high schools in the Southfield Public Schools district, the oldest being Southfield High School, and the youngest being University High School Academy.

Southfield-Lathrup High School was well known for its extensive and well-supported music program. It was also known locally for its girls' basketball team State Title in 2005.

== History, milestones, and awards ==
Southfield-Lathrup High School (SLHS) opened in 1967 to accommodate the growing Southfield and Lathrup Village populations. SLHS opened with the 1967-68 school year, accommodating Freshmen and Sophomores only from Birney Junior High School, one of four junior high schools in Southfield. Adding a Freshman class in each of the following two school years, 1968–69 and 1969–70, it graduated its first Senior class in 1970. Located in Lathrup Village, the high school was part of the Southfield Public School District.

Southfield-Lathrup High School closed at the end of the 2015-16 school year, and its students were divided between Southfield High School and University High School Academy, which moved into Lathrup's campus. Berkley High School, Groves High School, Shrine Catholic High School and Oak Park High School were also expected to receive some Southfield-Lathrup students.

=== Dress code ===
Beginning with the 2005–2006 school year, a dress code was instituted at the high school level, finalizing the process of bringing all of the Southfield Public Schools district under a dress code policy. All members of the board supported the measure and voted aye, except for Trustee Karen Miller. Ms. Miller voted no because she didn't feel that there was enough input from students in the development of the dress code.

== Campus ==
The campus consists of the main building, a soccer field, a football field, and various parking lots. Students park in the west parking lot. The building is divided into several distinct zones called "houses".

== Extracurricular activities ==
- Newspaper – The Charger Chronicle
- Yearbook – The Synthesis
- Art Club
- Gay-Straight Alliance
- Embrace The Difference
- Lathrup's Lovely Ladies
- Southfield-Lathrup High School Marching Band "Marching Chargers"
- Chess Club
- DECA
- Fashion Club
- Student Congress
- National Honor Society, http://www.southfield.k12.mi.us/education/club/club.php?sectionid=1511
- Scholars Plus

Graduates "Distinguished Scholars" from the Southfield Public School System

- Spanish Club
- French Club
- Intramural Sports Program
- Anime Club

== Curriculum ==
=== Academy learning ===
Southfield-Lathrup Senior High School is home to two of four Academies serving the Southfield Public Schools district, specifically the Medical and Natural Sciences Academy and the Arts and Communications Academy. Both academies have separate entry requirements from the mainstream curriculum. Most students apply at the end of their tenth grade year and take classes in their eleventh and twelfth grade years. The other two academies are the Engineering & Manufacturing Sciences Academy and the Global Business & Information Technology Academy, are located at Southfield High School

The Louise Ward Memorial Scholarship was established in 2001 for Southfield-Lathrup Students for continued studies in vocal music. The Fund was initiated by alumni of the Southfield Lathrup High School Madrigal Singers in grateful memory of Louise Ward who was, at once, their teacher, mentor, role model, and friend.

The Academy also won the 2000 GRAMMY signature award.

=== Advanced placement options ===
Southfield-Lathrup High also offered Advanced Placement (AP) courses in several different subjects including:

- United States History
- United States Government & Politics
- Biology
- Calculus
- Physics
- Environmental Science
- Chemistry
- Spanish Language
- English Language and Composition
- English Literature and Composition

In its final years, Southfield-Lathrup High School also offered Advanced Placement Physics, Statistics, European History, Spanish, and French. Though these courses weren't offered, students were encouraged to independently study the subject material and take the test.

== Notable alumni ==
- Willie Beavers, c/o 2011, professional football player
- Mike Chappell, c/o 1996, international professional basketball player
- Daniel Gilbert, owner of the Cleveland Cavaliers, founder of Quicken Loans
- Jon Glaser, c/o 1986, actor, comedian, and TV writer/producer
- Mark Howe, retired NHL defenseman
- Marty Howe, former professional ice hockey player
- Jason Jones, c/o 2004, professional American football player for the Detroit Lions
- Eric Lefkofsky, c/o 1987, internet entrepreneur and co-founder of Groupon
- Roy Devyn Marble, c/o 2010, basketball player for Maccabi Haifa of the Israeli Basketball Premier League
- Steven Pitt (psychiatrist)
- Michael Stone, retired safety for the New England Patriots and New York Giants
- Joe Tate, politician
- Mamadou Bah, c/o 2012, Fashion Designer
