= Michigan's 18th House of Representatives district =

American legislative district

Michigan's 18th State House of Representatives district
Representative
Jason Hoskins; D–Southfield
- Demographics: 40.6% White; 47.5% Black; 2.2% Hispanic; 3.6% Asian; 0.1% Native American; 0.2% Hawaiian/Pacific Islander; 0.3% Other; 5.5% Multiracial
- Population (2024): 90,885

Michigan's 18th House of Representatives district is a legislative district within the Michigan House of Representatives located in Oakland County. The district was created in 1965, when the Michigan Supreme Court ordered the reapportionment of state legislative districts from a county-based system to a proportional one following the Supreme Court case Reynolds v. Sims. It is currently represented by Democrat Jason Hoskins of Southfield.

== List of representatives ==
Representative	Party	Years	Residence	Notes
Leonard S. Walton	Democratic	1965–1972	Detroit	Reapportioned from the former Wayne County, 12th district.
Jackie Vaughn III	Democratic	1973–1978	Detroit	Redistricted from the 23rd district; resigned September 1978 after being elected to the Michigan Senate.
Carolyn Cheeks Kilpatrick	Democratic	1979–1982	Detroit	Redistricted to the 8th district.
Sidney Ouwinga	Republican	1983–1991	Marion	Died July 1991.
John Gernaat	Republican	1991 (Note: Elected in a 1991 special election to replace Rep. Sidney Ouwinga, who died.)–1992	McBain	Redistricted to the 102nd district.
Justine Barns	Democratic	1993–1994	Westland	Redistricted from the 38th district.
Eileen DeHart	Democratic	1995–2000	Westland	Term limited.
Glenn S. Anderson	Democratic	2001–2006	Westland	Term limited.
Richard LeBlanc	Democratic	2007–2012	Westland	Term limited.
Sarah B. Roberts	Democratic	2013–2016	St. Clair Shores	Previously served in the 24th district; term limited.
Kevin Hertel	Democratic	2017–2022	St. Clair Shores	Term limited.
Jason Hoskins	Democratic	2023–present	Southfield	
Kelly Garrett	Democratic	(Note: Member-elect.)	Lathrup Village	

== Historical district boundaries ==
Map	Description	Apportionment Plan	Notes
	Wayne County (part): Detroit (part)	1964 Apportionment Plan (Note: Referred to as the Austin-Kleiner plan.)	
	Wayne County (part): Detroit (part)	1972 Apportionment Plan (Note: Referred to as the Hatcher-Kleiner plan.)	
	Clare County; Lake County; Missaukee County; Osceola County; Wexford County	1992 Apportionment Plan	
	Wayne County (part): Canton Township (part); Westland (part)	2001 Apportionment Plan	
	Wayne County (part): Westland	2001 Apportionment Plan	
	Macomb County (part): Eastpointe; Grosse Pointe Shores (part); St. Clair Shores	2011 Apportionment Plan	
	Oakland County (part): Farmington (part); Farmington Hills (part); Lathrup Village; Oak Park (part); Southfield (part)	2021 Apportionment Plan (Note: Referred to as the Hickory plan.)	

== Recent elections ==
=== 2020s ===
2026 Michigan House of Representatives election
Party	Candidate	Votes	%
Democratic	Kelly Garrett	38,400	81.25
Republican	Ryan Foster	8,864	18.75
Total votes		47,264	100
Democratic hold			

2024 Michigan House of Representatives election
Party	Candidate	Votes	%
Democratic	Jason Hoskins (incumbent)	41,742	78.93
Republican	Mordechai Klainberg	11,144	21.07
Total votes		52,886	100
Democratic hold			

2022 Michigan House of Representatives election
Party	Candidate	Votes	%
Democratic	Jason Hoskins	34,419	79.63
Republican	Wendy Webster Jackson	8,803	20.37
Total votes		43,222	100
Democratic hold			

2020 Michigan House of Representatives election
Party	Candidate	Votes	%
Democratic	Kevin Hertel (incumbent)	32,569	60.27
Republican	Michael Babat	21,462	39.72
Write-In	Christine Timmon	7	0.01
Total votes		54,038	100
Democratic hold			

=== 2010s ===
2018 Michigan House of Representatives election
Party	Candidate	Votes	%
Democratic	Kevin Hertel (incumbent)	25,820	62.65
Republican	Kyle McKee	15,394	37.35
Total votes		41,214	100
Democratic hold			

2016 Michigan House of Representatives election
Party	Candidate	Votes	%
Democratic	Kevin Hertel	29,247	63.31
Republican	Renata Polonaise	16,953	36.69
Total votes		46,200	100
Democratic hold			

2014 Michigan House of Representatives election
Party	Candidate	Votes	%
Democratic	Sarah Roberts (incumbent)	18,854	62.06
Republican	Roland R. Fraschetti	11,524	37.94
Total votes		30,378	100
Democratic hold			

2012 Michigan House of Representatives election
Party	Candidate	Votes	%
Democratic	Sarah Roberts	29,438	63.54
Republican	Candice B. Rusie	15,671	33.82
Libertarian	Daniel J. Flamand	1,223	2.64
Total votes		46,332	100
Democratic hold			

2010 Michigan House of Representatives election
Party	Candidate	Votes	%
Democratic	Richard LeBlanc (incumbent)	14,792	67.52
Republican	Floyd S. Collins	6,645	30.33
U.S. Taxpayers'	Harold "Hal" Dunn	471	2.15
Total votes		21,908	100
Democratic hold			

=== 2000s ===
2008 Michigan House of Representatives election
Party	Candidate	Votes	%
Democratic	Richard LeBlanc (incumbent)	28,955	88.59
U.S. Taxpayers'	Harold "Hal" Dunn	3,730	11.41
Total votes		32,685	100
Democratic hold			

2006 Michigan House of Representatives election
Party	Candidate	Votes	%
Democratic	Richard LeBlanc	19,067	73.12
Republican	Sam Durante	6,298	24.15
U.S. Taxpayers'	Harold "Hal" Dunn	710	2.72
Total votes		26,075	100
Democratic hold			

2004 Michigan House of Representatives election
Party	Candidate	Votes	%
Democratic	Glenn S. Anderson (incumbent)	22,773	66.73
Republican	Kip R. Lipford	10,811	31.68
U.S. Taxpayers'	Harold "Hal" Dunn	541	1.59
Total votes		34,125	100
Democratic hold			

2002 Michigan House of Representatives election
Party	Candidate	Votes	%
Democratic	Glenn S. Anderson (incumbent)	14,619	70.16
Republican	Kip R. Lipford	6,218	29.84
Total votes		20,837	100
Democratic hold			

2000 Michigan House of Representatives election
Party	Candidate	Votes	%
Democratic	Glenn S. Anderson	19,176	62.52
Republican	Patricia A. Gibbons	10,571	34.46
Libertarian	David A. Nagy	926	3.02
Total votes		30,673	100
Democratic hold			

=== 1990s ===
1998 Michigan House of Representatives election
Party	Candidate	Votes	%
Democratic	Eileen DeHart (incumbent)	12,516	62.29
Republican	Steve Conley	7,004	34.86
Libertarian	Michael R. Corliss	572	2.85
Total votes		20,092	100
Democratic hold			
