= Michigan's 23rd Senate district =

American legislative district

Michigan's 23rd State Senate district
Senator
| Jim Runestad; R–White Lake |
- Demographics: 83.1% White; 4% Black; 4.7% Hispanic; 3.1% Asian; 0.1% Native American; 0.4% Other; 4.6% Multiracial
- Population (2024): 271,471

Michigan's 23rd Senate district is one of 38 districts in the Michigan Senate. The 23rd district was created by the 1850 Michigan Constitution, as the 1835 constitution only permitted a maximum of eight senate districts. It has been represented by Republican Jim Runestad since 2023, succeeding Democrat Curtis Hertel Jr.

== Geography ==
District 23 encompasses part of Oakland County.

=== 2011 Apportionment Plan ===
District 23, as dictated by the 2011 Apportionment Plan, was based in Lansing and covered most of Ingham County, also included the surrounding communities of East Lansing, Mason, Haslett, Holt, Okemos, Edgemont Park, Meridian Township, and Delhi Township.

The district was located entirely within Michigan's 8th congressional district, and overlapped with the 67th, 68th, and 69th districts of the Michigan House of Representatives.

== List of senators ==
| Senator | Party | Dates | Residence | Notes |
|---|---|---|---|---|
| Israel V. Harris | Democratic | 1853–1854 | Tallmadge | |
| Mordecai L. Hopkins | Democratic | 1855–1856 | Ottawa County | |
| Marcus B. Wilcox | Republican | 1857–1858 | Pinckney | |
| Robert Crouse | Republican | 1859–1860 | Hartland | |
| John H. Galloway | Republican | 1861–1862 | Howell | |
| William A. Clark | Democratic | 1863–1864 | Howell | |
| Hugh McCurdy | Democratic | 1865–1866 | Corunna | |
| Willard B. Arms | Republican | 1867–1868 | Fentonville | |
| Thaddeus G. Smith | Republican | 1869–1870 | Fentonville | |
| Josiah W. Begole | Republican | 1871–1872 | Flint | |
| Ira H. Butterfield | Republican | 1873–1874 | Lapeer | |
| Jeremiah Jenks | Republican | 1875–1876 | Huron County | |
| Dan P. Foote | Democratic | 1877–1878 | Saginaw | |
| William H. P. Benjamin | Democratic | 1879–1880 | Bridgeport | |
| John Welch | Republican | 1881–1882 | East Saginaw | |
| John Roost | Democratic | 1883–1884 | Holland | |
| John W. Moon | Republican | 1885–1886 | Muskegon | |
| Lewis G. Palmer | Republican | 1887–1890 | Big Rapids | |
| Aaron B. Brown | Patrons (Note: The Patrons of Industry were a farming organization founded in Port Huron, Michigan which, by 1890, had begun participating in political action independent of other political parties at the state level.) | 1891–1892 | Sheridan | |
| Charles L. Brundage | Republican | 1893–1896 | Muskegon | |
| William Savidge | Republican | 1897–1898 | Spring Lake | |
| Suel A. Sheldon | Republican | 1899–1900 | Berlin | |
| William D. Kelly | Republican | 1901–1904 | Muskegon | |
| Suel A. Sheldon | Republican | 1905–1906 | Berlin | |
| Luke Lugers | Republican | 1907–1908 | Holland | |
| Tom J. G. Bolt | Republican | 1909–1910 | Ravenna | |
| John Vanderwerp | Republican | 1911–1912 | Muskegon | |
| Joseph B. Hadden | Progressive | 1913–1914 | Holland | |
| Edward Hofma | Republican | 1915–1916 | Spring Lake | |
| Vincent A. Martin | Republican | 1917–1918 | Fruitport | |
| William M. Connelly | Republican | 1919–1920 | Spring Lake | |
| Arthur J. Bolt | Republican | 1921–1922 | Muskegon | |
| William M. Connelly | Republican | 1923–1924 | Spring Lake | |
| Vincent A. Martin | Republican | 1925–1928 | Fruitport | |
| Gordon F. Van Eenenaam | Republican | 1929–1936 | Muskegon | |
| Earnest C. Brooks | Democratic | 1937–1938 | Holland | |
| John Vanderwerp | Republican | 1939 | Muskegon | Died in office. |
| Earnest C. Brooks | Democratic | 1941–1942 | Holland | |
| Frank E. McKee | Republican | 1943–1944 | Muskegon | |
| William C. Vandenberg | Republican | 1945–1950 | Holland | |
| Frank E. McKee | Republican | 1951 | Muskegon | Died in office. |
| Clyde H. Geerlings | Republican | 1951–1964 | Holland | |
| Harold J. Volkema | Republican | 1965–1967 | Holland | Died in office. |
| Gary Byker | Republican | 1968–1978 | Hudsonville | |
| Edgar Fredricks | Republican | 1979–1990 | Holland | |
| William Van Regenmorter | Republican | 1991–1994 | Jenison | |
| Joanne G. Emmons | Republican | 1995–2002 | Big Rapids | |
| Virgil Bernero | Democratic | 2003–2005 | Lansing | Resigned after elected mayor of Lansing. |
| Gretchen Whitmer | Democratic | 2006–2014 | East Lansing | |
| Curtis Hertel Jr. | Democratic | 2015–2022 | East Lansing | |
| Jim Runestad | Republican | 2023–present | White Lake | |

== Recent election results ==
=== 2020s ===
2026 Michigan Senate election
Primary election
| Party | Candidate | Votes | % |
|---|---|---|---|
| Republican | Donni Steele | 23,150 | 62 |
| Republican | Daniel Lawless | 14,188 | 38 |
| Total votes | | 37,338 | 100 |
| Democratic | Greg Hill | 18,471 | 56.41 |
| Democratic | Margarette Gupta | 14,273 | 43.59 |
| Total votes | | 32,744 | 100 |
General election
| Republican | Donni Steele | 84,995 | 58.77 |
| Democratic | Greg Hill | 59,619 | 41.23 |
| Total votes | | 144,614 | 100 |
| Republican hold | | | |

2022 Michigan Senate election, District 23
Primary election
| Party | Candidate | Votes | % |
|---|---|---|---|
| Democratic | Una Hepburn | 12,943 | 57.4 |
| Democratic | Michael J. Wiese | 9,602 | 42.6 |
| Total votes | | 22,545 | 100 |
General election
| Republican | Jim Runestad (incumbent) | 78,175 | 59.4 |
| Democratic | Una Hepburn | 53,474 | 40.6 |
| Total votes | | 131,649 | 100 |
| Republican gain from Democratic | | | |

=== 2018 ===
2018 Michigan Senate election, District 23
Primary election
| Party | Candidate | Votes | % |
|---|---|---|---|
| Republican | Andrea Pollock | 6,811 | 53.9 |
| Republican | Nancy Denny | 5,833 | 46.1 |
| Total votes | | 12,644 | 100 |
General election
| Democratic | Curtis Hertel Jr. (incumbent) | 73,189 | 68.5 |
| Republican | Andrea Pollock | 33,721 | 31.5 |
| Total votes | | 106,910 | 100 |
| Democratic hold | | | |

=== 2014 ===
2014 Michigan Senate election, District 23
Primary election
| Party | Candidate | Votes | % |
|---|---|---|---|
| Democratic | Curtis Hertel Jr. | 10,963 | 69.8 |
| Democratic | Larry Hutchinson | 2,436 | 15.5 |
| Democratic | Harold Leeman Jr. | 2,299 | 14.6 |
| Total votes | | 15,698 | 100 |
General election
| Democratic | Curtis Hertel Jr. | 50,824 | 66.1 |
| Republican | Darrell McNeill | 26,076 | 33.9 |
| Total votes | | 76,900 | 100 |
| Democratic hold | | | |

=== Federal and statewide results ===
| Year | Office | Results |
|---|---|---|
| 2020 | President | Biden 66.6 – 31.5% |
| 2018 | Senate | Stabenow 66.9 – 31.2% |
| 2018 | Governor | Whitmer 68.7 – 28.4% |
| 2016 | President | Clinton 61.9 – 32.2% |
| 2014 | Senate | Peters 66.0 – 30.7% |
| 2014 | Governor | Schauer 58.8 – 39.3% |
| 2012 | President | Obama 64.8 – 34.2% |
| 2012 | Senate | Stabenow 68.3 – 28.5% |

== Historical district boundaries ==
| Map | Description | Apportionment Plan | Notes |
|---|---|---|---|
| | Allegan County; Barry County (part); Yankee Springs Township; Ottawa County; Van Buren County | 1964 Apportionment Plan | |
| | Allegan County; Barry County (part); Prairieville Township; Kalamazoo County (part); Alamo Township; Kent County (part); Grandville; Ottawa County; Van Buren County (part); Arlington Township; Bangor; Bloomingdale Township; Columbia Township; Covert Township; Geneva Township; Gobles; South Haven; South Haven Township | 1972 Apportionment Plan | |
| | Allegan County; Ottawa County (part); Allendale Township; Blendon Township; Chester Township; Coopersville; Crockery Township; Ferrysburg; Georgetown Township; Grand Haven; Grand Haven Township; Holland; Holland Township; Hudsonville; Olive Township; Park Township; Polkston Township; Port Sheldon Township; Robinson Township; Spring Lake Township; Tallmadge Township; Wright Township; Zeeland; Zeeland Township | 1982 Apportionment Plan | |
| | Barry County; Ionia County; Isabella County; Mecosta County; Montcalm County | 1992 Apportionment Plan | |
| | Ingham County (part); Alaiedon Township; Aurelius Township; Delhi Township; East Lansing (part); Ingham Township; Lansing (part); Lansing Township; Leroy Township; Locke Township; Meridian Township; Onondaga Township; Wheatfield Township; White Oak Township; Williamston; Williamstown Township | 2001 Apportionment Plan | |
| | Ingham County (part); Alaiedon Township; Aurelius Township; Bunker Hill Township; Delhi Township; East Lansing; Ingham Township; Lansing; Lansing Township; Leslie; Leslie Township; Mason; Meridian Township; Onondaga Township; Stockbridge Township; Vevay Township; White Oak Township | 2011 Apportionment Plan | |
