= SPSD =

SPSD can refer to:

- Southfield Public School District
- Saskatoon Public School Division
- Symmetric Positive Semi-Definite matrix, in linear algebra
