= Senator Frederick =

Senator Frederick may refer to:

- Lew Frederick (born 1951), Oregon State Senate
- Mel Frederick (1929–2019), Minnesota State Senate

== See also ==
- Edgar Fredricks (1942–2016), Michigan State Senate
