= George Cromwell =

American politician (1860–1934)

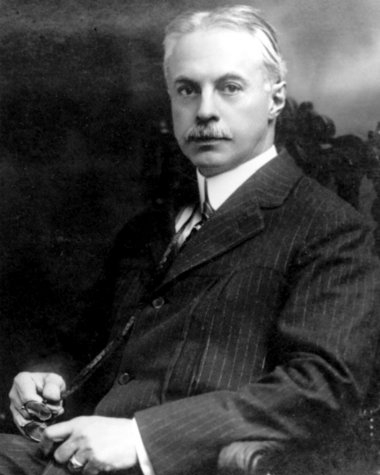

Member of the New York Senate from the 23rd district
- In office January 1, 1915 – December 31, 1918
- Preceded by: George A. Blauvelt
- Succeeded by: John J. Dunnigan

1st Borough President of Staten Island
- In office January 1, 1898 – December 31, 1913
- Preceded by: None (office created)
- Succeeded by: Charles J. McCormack

Member of the New York State Assembly from Richmond County
- In office January 1, 1888 – December 31, 1888
- Preceded by: Edward A. Moore
- Succeeded by: Hubbard R. Yetman

Personal details
- Born: George Cromwell; July 3, 1860 Brooklyn, New York, U.S.
- Died: September 17, 1934 (aged 74) Staten Island, New York, U.S.
- Party: Republican
- Spouse: Hermine de Rouville
- Education: Brooklyn Polytechnic Institute; Yale University; Columbia Law School

George Cromwell (July 3, 1860 – September 17, 1934) was an American lawyer and politician from New York.

== Life ==
He was the son of Henry Bowman Cromwell, founder of the Cromwell Shipping Line, and Sarah (Seaman) Cromwell. He attended Brooklyn Polytechnic Institute, and graduated from Yale College in 1883. He graduated from Columbia Law School in 1886, and practiced law with the firm of Elihu Root until 1889. He was a member of the New York State Assembly (Richmond County) in 1888.

From 1889 to 1897, he practiced law with the firm of Butler, Stillman & Hubbard, and was in charge of the admiralty law branch. In 1897, he opened his own law office on Broadway (Manhattan).

After the consolidation of New York City, he was elected the first Borough President of Richmond in a very close and contested election, with a margin of only six votes, that was decided by the New York State Court of Appeals. He was elected three times, and served from 1898 to 1913.

He was a member of the New York State Senate (23rd D.) from 1915 to 1918, sitting in the 138th, 139th, 140th and 141st New York State Legislatures. He declined to run for re-election in 1918. On June 1, 1915, in his first senate term, he married Hermine de Rouville, a member of the noted Hertel de Rouville family of Quebec. They had no children.

On September 11, 1934, he suffered a stroke, and died six days later in Dongan Hills, Staten Island. He was buried at the Moravian Cemetery in New Dorp, Staten Island.

New York State Assembly
Preceded by Edward A. Moore	New York State Assembly; Richmond County; 1888	Succeeded by Hubbard R. Yetman
Political offices
Preceded by new office	Borough President of Richmond; 1898–1913	Succeeded by Charles J. McCormack
New York State Senate
Preceded by George A. Blauvelt	New York State Senate; 23rd District; 1915–1918	Succeeded by John J. Dunnigan
