= Lathrup Village Historic District =

- U.S. National Register of Historic Places
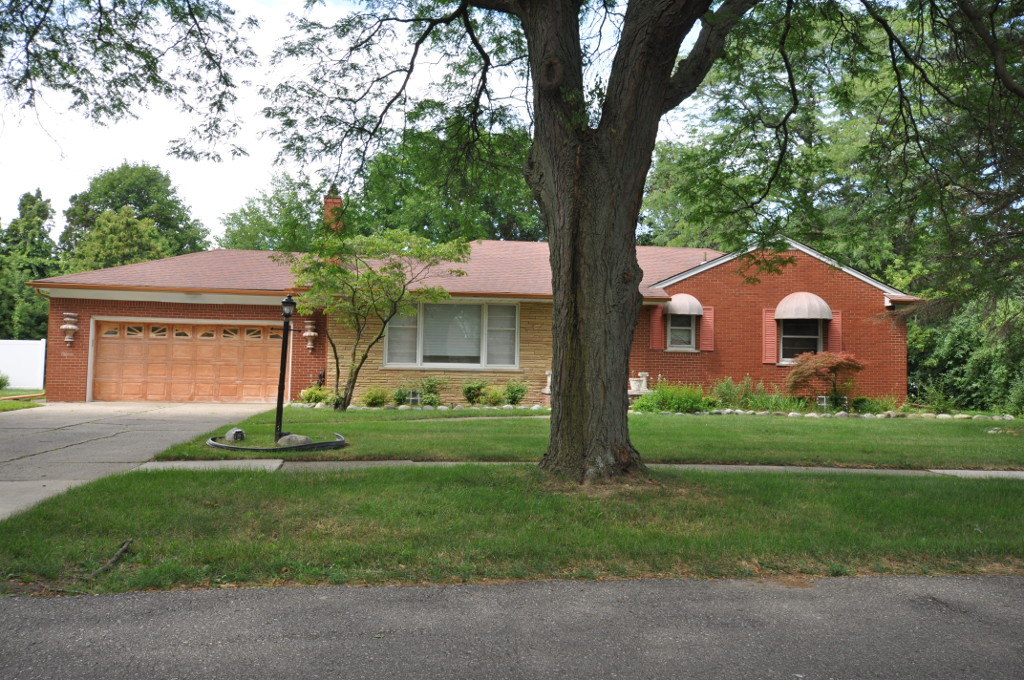
- Interactive map
- Location: Roughly bounded by city limit, Red River Dr., I-696, Middlesex Ave., Meadowbrook Way, and Margate Ave., Lathrup Village, Michigan
- Coordinates: 42°29′35″N 83°13′35″W
- Area: 680 acres (280 ha)
- Architect: J.H.G. Steffens, John B. Jewell, J. Ivan Dise and F. Orla Varney
- Architectural style: Mission/Spanish Revival, Tudor Revival, Colonial Revival
- NRHP reference No.: 98000150
- Added to NRHP: March 16, 1998

The Lathrup Village Historic District is a residential historic district located in Lathrup Village, Michigan and roughly bounded by city limit, Red River Drive, I-696, Middlesex Avenue, Meadowbrook Way, and Margate Avenue. The district was listed on the National Register of Historic Places in 1998.

== History ==
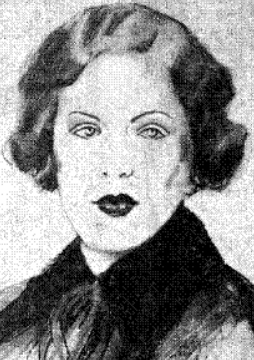
Louise Lathrup Kelley

Lathrup Village was conceived as a model community by developer Louise Lathrup Kelley, who platted the village in 1924. The first house was constructed that same year, and development continued into the 1960s. Development had to adhere to a number of restrictions, particularly that all buildings were to be single family homes, of low design, and faced with brick, stone, or stucco. The community existed with no government, save for the local township, until the 1950s. After 1945, more development came to the area, and primarily ranch houses were constructed.

== Description ==
The Lathrup Village Historic District is a residential district, with streets laid out in a geometric and curvilinear street pattern that produces octagonal, circular and semi-circular focal groupings, and a series of small triangular parks scattered throughout the district. The district covers most of Lathrup Village, and includes 1156 buildings, of which 994 contribute to the historic character of the district.

Nearly all of the district's houses were constructed between 1930 and 1940, and 1945 and 1960. The district includes various historical revival styles, including Colonial, English Tudor, English Cottage, and Spanish Colonial, as well as a few later Modern houses and a number of post-World War II split-level houses.

== Gallery ==
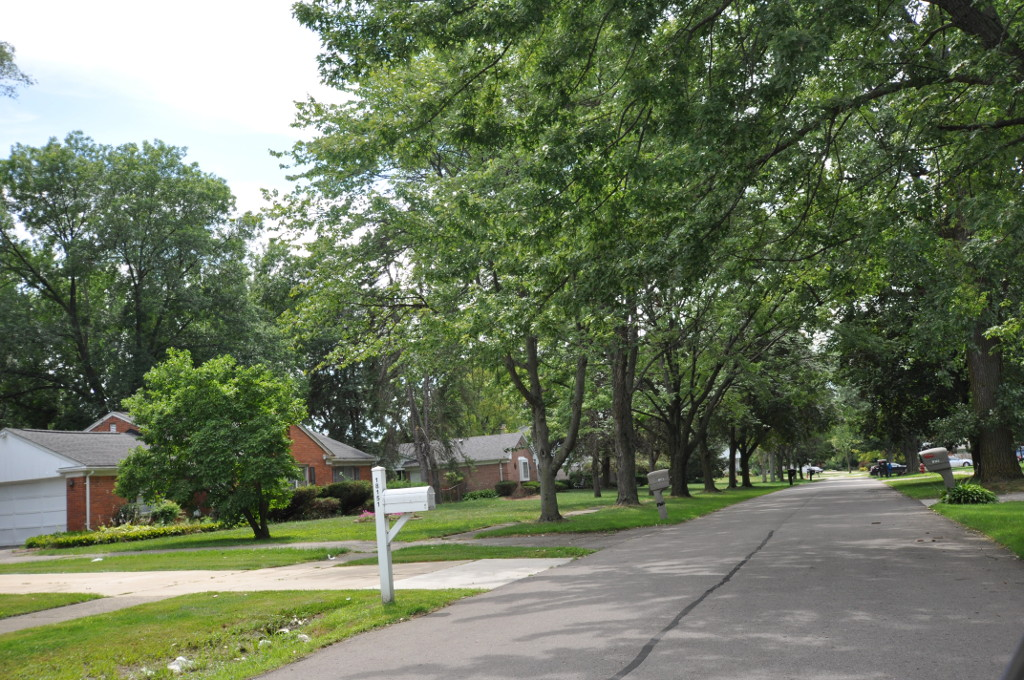

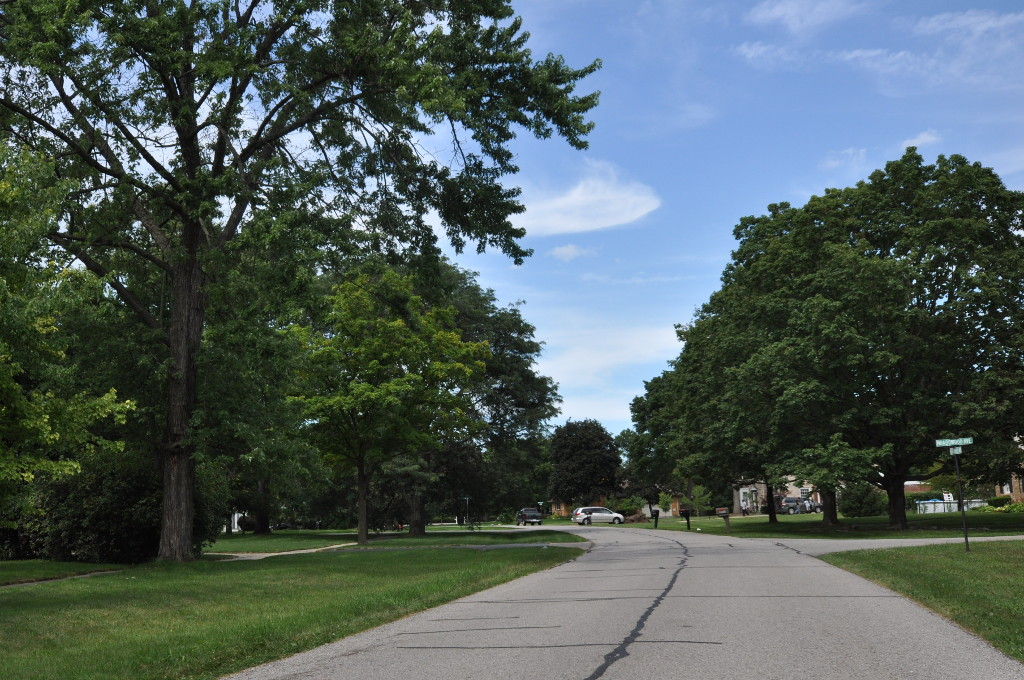

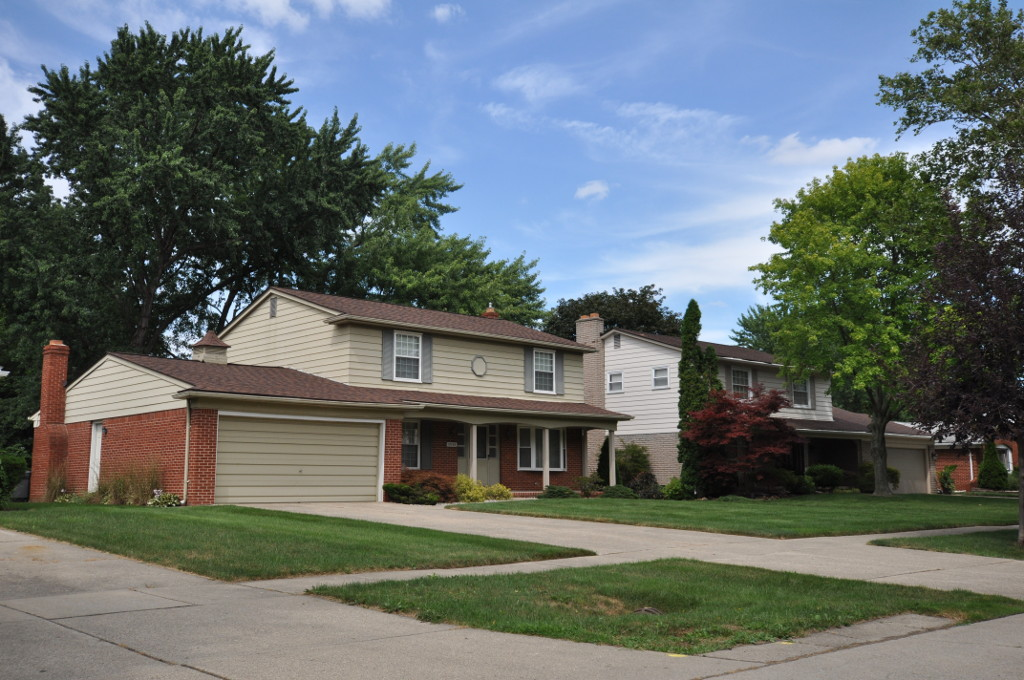

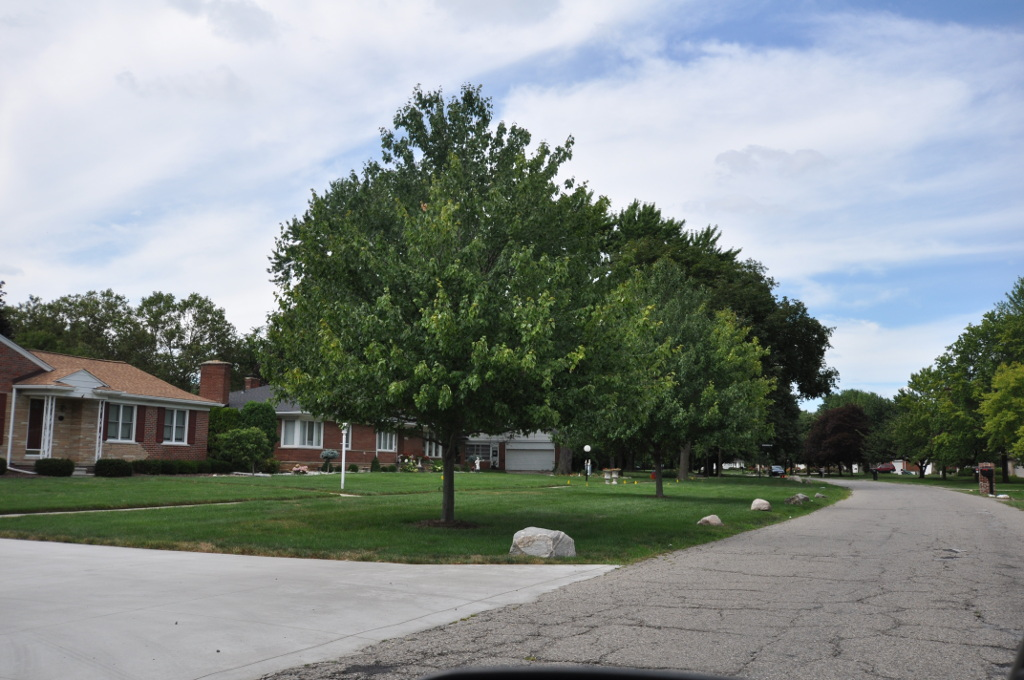

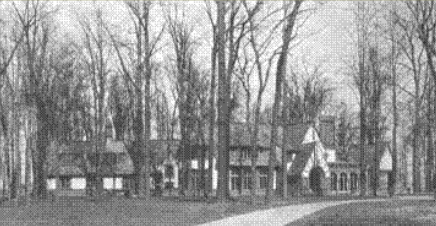
House in the Woods

== See also ==
- National Register of Historic Places listings in Oakland County, Michigan
