= Markus Heinrich Grauel =

German composer and cellist

Markus Heinrich Grauel (sometimes Marcus Heinrich Graul; 17?? – 1799) was a German composer and cellist of the classical period.

== Life ==
Grauel was born in Eisenach, though his birth year remains unknown. The earliest available information concerning Grauel's career is a mention of him working alongside his father-in-law, Johann Christian Hertel, at the court of the duchy of Mecklenburg-Strelitz in Neustrelitz at the time of the Hofkapelle's dissolution in 1753, when he was forced to search for employment elsewhere.

After leaving Neustrelitz, Grauel was employed by Johann Nepomuk Gotthard Graf von Schaffgotsch in Berlin. He began his employment at the Prussian court in Berlin on 1 December 1763, where he remained until his death in 1799.

The majority of contemporary accounts concerning Grauel date from his time in Berlin. Most notably, Charles Burney, after his visit to Berlin in 1772 wrote: "M. Grauel, a violoncello performer in the King’s band, played a concerto; it was but ordinary music; however, it was well executed, though in the old manner, with the hand under the bow." On the contrary, his compositional skill was mentioned favourably by two contemporary commentators, Ernst Ludwig Gerber: "He is said to be a skilled and competent performer and composer for his instrument" and Johann Adam Hiller: "[Grauel] plays his instrument very well and sets beautiful concertos and solos for it."

Like the majority of composers working in Berlin during the second half of the 18th century, Grauel's compositions are highly representative of the Empfindsamer Stil and retain many characteristics of the Baroque compositional style. There are only six surviving works which bear Grauel's name and many of his pieces are thought to have been lost, with several others probably misattributed. It seems that some confusion arose due to the similarity of the name 'Grauel' to his contemporaries Johann Gottlieb and Karl Heinrich Graun, also musicians at the Berlin court. Further confusion has been caused by the various spellings of Grauel's name, most commonly "Graul", but also "Gravel".

== Works ==
Concerto in A major for violin, strings and basso continuo
Concerto in C major for viola, strings and basso continuo
Concerto in E-flat major for viola, strings and basso continuo
Concerto in E-flat major for viola, strings and basso continuo (also attributed to "Graun" in one manuscript)
Concerto in A major for cello, strings and basso continuo
Sonata in G major for violin and obbligato keyboard

"Solo di Gravel a Viola con Basso" (Lost)
