= Kelly Garrett (politician) =

American politician

Member-elect of the Michigan House of Representatives from the 18th district
- Assuming office January 1, 2027
- Succeeding: Jason Hoskins

Personal details
- Born: Detroit, Michigan, USA
- Party: Democratic
- Education: Rochester Christian University; University of Rochester; University of Phoenix
- Website: Campaign website

Mykale (Kelly) Garrett is an American politician who is the member-elect for the 18th district of the Michigan House of Representatives. She was elected at the 2026 election. She is the first African American mayor of Lathrup Village.
