= Chukwuma Okorafor =

Nigerian American football player (born 1997)

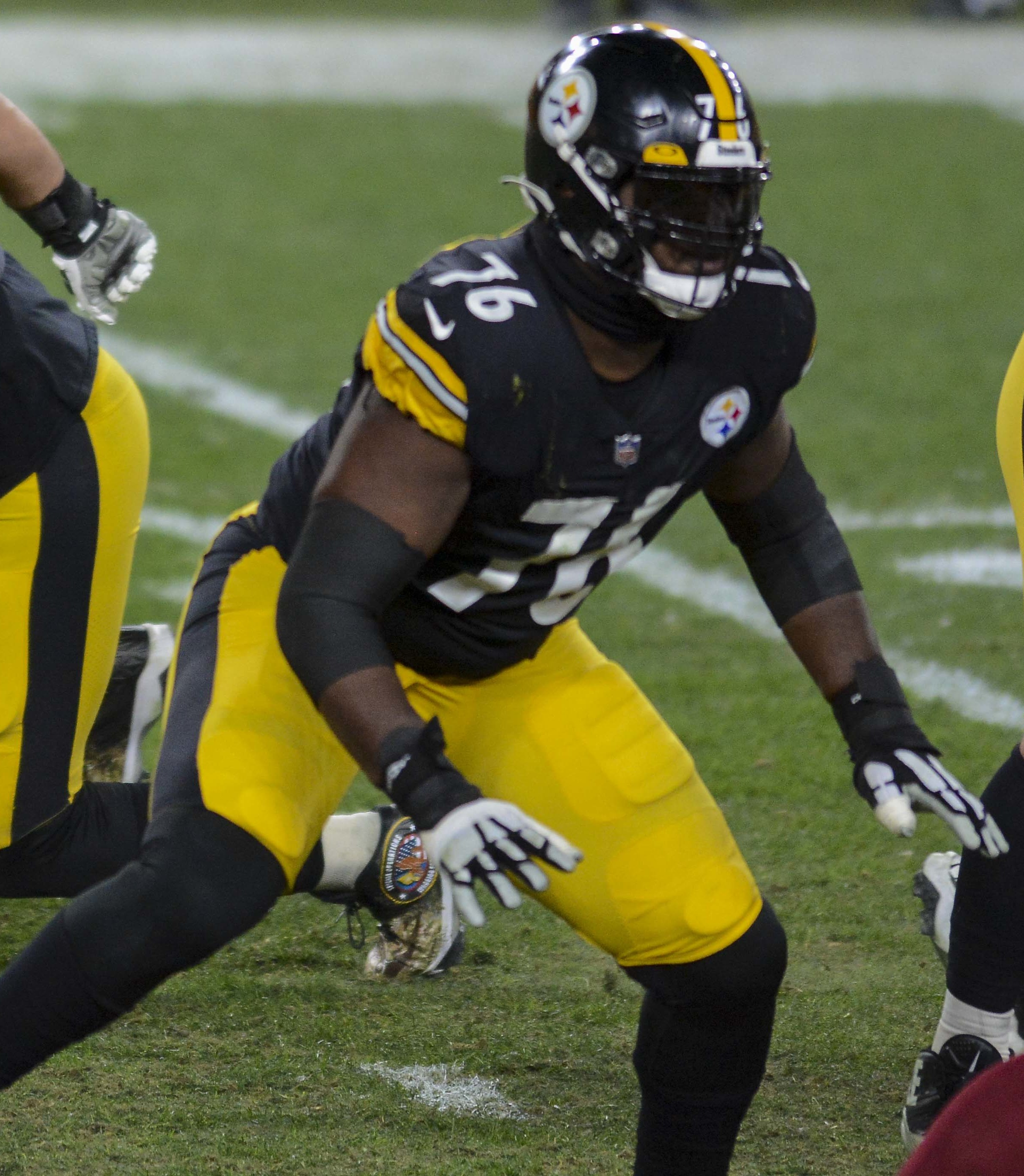
- Okorafor with the Pittsburgh Steelers in 2020

No. 79 – New York Jets
- Position: Offensive tackle
- Roster status: Active

Personal information
- Born: August 8, 1997 (age 29); Ibadan, Nigeria
- Listed height: 6 ft 6 in (1.98 m)
- Listed weight: 320 lb (145 kg)

Career information
- High school: Southfield (Southfield, Michigan, U.S.)
- College: Western Michigan (2014–2017)
- NFL draft: 2018: 3rd round, 92nd overall pick

Career history
- Pittsburgh Steelers (2018–2023); New England Patriots (2024); New York Jets (2025–present)

Awards and highlights
- First-team All-American (2017); 2× First-team All-MAC (2016–2017)

Career NFL statistics as of 2025
- Games played: 92
- Games started: 60
- Stats at Pro Football Reference

Chukwuma Okorafor (born August 8, 1997) is a Nigerian professional American football offensive tackle for the New York Jets of the National Football League (NFL). He has also played for the Pittsburgh Steelers and New England Patriots. He played college football for the Western Michigan Broncos.

== Early life ==
Okorafor was born in Nigeria, and lived in South Africa and Botswana before his family emigrated to the United States in 2010. He attended Southfield High School in Southfield, Michigan and started at both offensive and defensive line. He was named a 3-star recruit by 247Sports and was considered the 11th best football recruit in Michigan as a senior. Chukwuma received offers from numerous programs, some of which included Arkansas, Florida, Iowa, Nebraska, North Carolina State, Ohio State, and Oklahoma, but chose to play at Western Michigan due to its close proximity to home and the school's promise to start him as a true freshman.

== College career ==
Okorafor played college football for Western Michigan from 2014 to 2017. In 2016 and 2017, he was named to the All-Mid-American Conference first-team. In 2017, he was named a Football Writers Association of America First Team All-American. On January 27, 2018, Okorafor played in the 2018 Reese's Senior Bowl and was a part of the North team that lost 45–16 to the South team.

== Professional career ==
External videos
- Okorafor's NFL Combine Workout

Okorafor attended private workouts and visits with the Washington Redskins and Philadelphia Eagles. He was ranked as the sixth-best offensive tackle in the draft by Sports Illustrated, the ninth-best offensive tackle by DraftScout.com, and the 11th best-offensive tackle by Scouts Inc.

Pre-draft measurables
Height	Weight	Arm length	Hand span	Wingspan	40-yard dash	10-yard split	20-yard split	20-yard shuttle	Three-cone drill	Vertical jump	Broad jump	Bench press
6 ft 6 in (1.98 m)	320 lb (145 kg)	34 1/2 in (0.88 m)	10 1/4 in (0.26 m)	6 ft 11 3/8 in (2.12 m)	5.31 s	1.85 s	3.07 s	4.80 s	7.87 s	23.5 in (0.60 m)	8 ft 6 in (2.59 m)	20 reps
All values from NFL Combine/Pro Day

=== Pittsburgh Steelers ===
External videos
- Steelers draft Okorafor 92nd overall

The Pittsburgh Steelers selected Okorafor in the third round (92nd overall) of the 2018 NFL draft. Okorafor was the 11th offensive tackle drafted in 2018. On May 22, 2018, the Steelers signed Okorafor to a four-year, $3.40 million contract that included a signing bonus of $812,364.

On November 25, 2018, against the Denver Broncos, Okorafor made his first NFL start at right tackle due to injuries to Marcus Gilbert and Matt Feiler. During the 2018 NFL season, he also made two starts as a tight end, being used by the Steelers as an extra tackle.

On November 10, 2019, against the Los Angeles Rams, Okorafor made his first start of the 2019 NFL season due to an injury to Ramon Foster.

On March 14, 2022, Okorafor signed a three-year, $29.25 million contract extension with the Steelers.

On February 20, 2024, the Steelers released Okorafor.

=== New England Patriots ===
On March 7, 2024, Okorafor signed a one-year contract with the New England Patriots. He was named the Week 1 starting left tackle, but was benched midgame due to poor play. He was placed on the exempt/left squad list before Week 2. He would not return to the team after the five-day exemption period expired, meaning that he would not be allowed to play for the rest of the season. On February 10, 2025, Okorafor was cut by the Patriots.

=== New York Jets ===
On March 12, 2025, Okorafor signed a one-year, $1.33 million contract with the New York Jets.

On March 17, 2026, Okorafor re-signed with the Jets on a one-year, $1.48 million contract.
