= Charles J. McCormack =

New York City politician

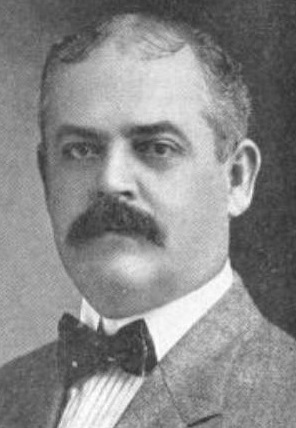
- Real Estate Record and Builders Guide, July 17, 1915

2nd Borough President of Staten Island
- In office January 1, 1914 – July 11, 1915
- Preceded by: George Cromwell
- Succeeded by: Spire Pitou, Jr. (acting)

New York State Assemblyman from Richmond County
- In office 1903–1903
- Preceded by: Ferdinand C. Townsend
- Succeeded by: George Bechtel
- Constituency: Richmond County

Personal details
- Born: 1865 New York City, New York (state)
- Died: July 11, 1915 (aged 49–50) Rosebank, Staten Island
- Cause of death: Bright's disease
- Resting place: St. Peter's Cemetery
- Party: Democratic
- Children: Vincent (son), May (daughter)

Charles J. McCormack (1865 – July 11, 1915) was an American businessman who was a New York City politician in the early part of the 20th century.

== Early life and career ==
McCormack was born in Manhattan in 1865, and attended local public schools. He started his working career at the real estate concern of Hugh Grant before the latter became Mayor of New York City. In 1895, McCormack moved to Staten Island, where he worked for lawyers as a searcher of title deeds.

== Political career ==
McCormack became active in local politics, and was elected to the New York State Assembly in 1902, representing Richmond County in the 126th New York State Legislature. From 1904 to 1907 he was Sheriff of Richmond County, and in 1907, with the backing of Mayor George McClellan, he became the leader of the Democratic Party on Staten Island, replacing long-time local Democratic boss Nicholas Muller. In 1908, McClellan removed Muller as Commissioner of Taxes and Assessments because of the latter's own large tax delinquency and appoint McCormack in his place. McCormack also served as a deputy water commissioner. In November 1913 he was elected to the Staten Island borough presidency, and served until his death in 1915.

== Death ==
In early 1915 McCormack became ill with Bright's disease. His case was not curable, and he died early in the morning of July 11, 1915, at Mount Manresa, a retreat for Catholic laymen, at Rosebank, on Staten Island. He was survived by his wife, his son Vincent, and his daughter May. McCormack was very popular as borough president, and his funeral was described at that time as the largest throng ever on Staten Island. After lying in state at Staten Island Borough Hall, his body was taken to St. Peter's Church for the funeral service, and then to St. Peter's Cemetery on Staten Island for burial.

Political offices
Preceded by Ferdinand C. Townsend	New York State Assembly; Richmond County; 1903	Succeeded by George Bechtel
Preceded by George Cromwell	Staten Island Borough President; 1914–1915	Succeeded by Spire Pitou, Jr. (acting)
