= Jason Hoskins (politician) =

American politician

Member of the Michigan House of Representatives from the 18th district
- Incumbent
- Assumed office January 1, 2023
- Preceded by: Kevin Hertel
- Succeeded by: Kelly Garrett (elect)

Southfield, Michigan city council
- In office November 2019 – December 2022
- Preceded by: Sarah Roberts
- Succeeded by: Jason Hoskins

Personal details
- Born: Michigan
- Party: Democratic
- Education: Eastern Michigan University (BA, MPA); University of Detroit Mercy (JD)

Jason Hoskins is an American politician serving as a member of the Michigan House of Representatives since 2023, representing the 18th district. He is a member of the Democratic Party.

== Career ==
Hoskins worked as a policy intern for Governor Jennifer Granholm and an intern for both Washtenaw County and the Third Judicial Circuit of Michigan while in college for his MBA from Eastern Michigan University and his JD from University of Detroit Mercy. During his time at University of Detroit Mercy he founded and later served as the president of the University of Detroit Mercy chapter of the American Civil Liberties Union because of this he would become a board member and vice president of the Metro Detroit branch of the American Civil Liberties Union.

After graduating from college he would become a part of Jeremy Moss's 2014 House campaign and Mark Totten's 2014 Michigan Attorney General campaign, after which he would become a professor at Lawrence Technological University from August 2016 to January 2017 from 2015 to when he was sworn into the state house in 2023 he worked as a member of Jeremy Moss's staff. In 2019 he would be elected to the Southfield City council serving in the role until 2023. In 2022 he ran for the 18th district winning the Democratic Primary by 55% to 44% then proceeding to easily win the general election by 79% to 20% becoming the first LGBTQ Person of color to be elected to the Michigan House of Representatives.

Hoskins was reelected in 2024.

Hopkins ran for the Democratic nomination in the 2026 Michigan Senate election in the 7th district. He won the nomination with 57% of the vote.
