= Southfield Public Schools =

School district in Michigan, United States

Address
- 24661 Lahser Rd. Southfield, Oakland County, Michigan, 48033; United States

District information
- Type: Public school district
- Grades: Prekindergarten-12
- Superintendent: Dr. Jennifer Martin-Green
- Schools: 11
- Budget: $115,878,000 2022-2023 expenditures
- NCES District ID: 2632310

Students and staff
- Students: 4,491 (2024-2025)
- Teachers: 284.16 (on an FTE basis) (2024-2025)
- Staff: 857.08 FTE (2024-2025)
- Student–teacher ratio: 15.8 (2024-2025)

Other information
- Website: www.southfieldk12.org

Southfield Public Schools is a public school district in Metro Detroit in the U.S. state of Michigan, serving most of Southfield and all of Lathrup Village.

While the city of Southfield lost about 2.2 percent of its total population between 2000 and 2020, Southfield Public Schools lost about 55 percent of its enrollment between the 2002-2003 and 2023-2024 school years. In 2022, voters in the district passed a $345 million bond issue to improve and "right-size" district facilities.

== History ==
Between 1900 and 1920, Southfield Township (precursor to Southfield) had a steady population of about 1,300 and several one-room schoolhouse districts such as Angling, Beddow, Klett, McKinley, and Stone.

One of the first multi-classroom brick school buildings in Southfield was the 1921 John Grace School at 21030 Indian Street. Subdivisions were developed in the southern part of the township in the late 1920s, and four schools from that era were the 1927 Annie Lathrup School on Southfield Road, the 1929 McKinley School at 18330 George Washington Drive, and the 1927 Magnolia School on Dorset Avenue. Southfield No. 10 School was built in 1928 at Berg and Ten Mile Roads.

Southfield High School was built during 1949 and 1950. Previously, high school students had attended other districts' high schools, such as Highland Park Community High School.

Southfield gained nearly 38,000 residents between 1960 and 1970, and the district undertook an expansion program. In 1963, Levey Junior High, Schoenhalls Elementary, and additions at Southfield High were completed. In fall 1965, Thompson Junior High School, Stevenson Elementary, and Vandenberg Elementary opened, though incomplete due to construction delays, as were additions at Kennedy Elementary and Southfield High. Southfield-Lathrup High School opened in 1967.

== Schools ==
Schools in Southfield Public Schools district
| School | Address | Grades | Notes |
|---|---|---|---|
| Morris Adler Elementary School | 19100 Filmore St., Southfield | K-5 | |
| Alice M. Birney K-8 School | 27225 Evergreen Road, Southfield | K-8 | Formerly Birney Middle School. Opened fall 1959. |
| Bussey Center For Early Childhood Education | 24501 Fredrick Street, Southfield | Preschool | Formerly Northbrook Elementary School |
| Kennedy Learning Center | 16299 Mt. Vernon, Southfield | K-12 | Formerly Kennedy Elementary School. School for students with special needs. |
| Glenn W. Levey Middle School | 25300 W. 9 Mile Road, Southfield | 6-8 | Opened fall 1964, named for assistant superintendent Glenn W. Levey. |
| McIntyre Elementary School | 19600 Saratoga Boulevard, Southfield | K-5 | |
| Southfield High School | 24675 Lahser Rd., Southfield | 9-12 | |
| Adlai Stevenson Elementary School | 27777 Lahser Road, Southfield | K-5 | Opened fall 1965. |
| Thompson K-8 International Academy | 16300 Lincoln Drive, Southfield | K-8 | Foreign language focus. Formerly Thompson Middle School. Opened fall 1965. |
| University K-12 Academy | 19301 W. 12 Mile Rd., Lathrup Village | K-12 | Formerly Southfield-Lathrup High School, college-preparatory STEM school |

=== Defunct schools ===
| School | Address | Notes |
|---|---|---|
| Angling Road Elementary School | 27800 Franklin, Southfield | Closed 1976, converted to office space around 1981. |
| Brace-Lederle School | 18575 West Nine Mile, Southfield | Formerly Lederle Middle School. Sold 2024. |
| Brooks School | Eleven Mile Road at Lasher, Southfield | Housed Southfield Public Library between 1960 and 1964. Currently Greyhound bus station. |
| Eisenhower Elementary School | 24500 Larkins, Southfield | Built 1970, closed 2010. |
| John Grace School | 21030 Indian Road, Southfield | Converted to the John Grace Community Center |
| John F. Kennedy Elementary School | 16299 Mt. Vernon, Southfield | Converted to the Southfield Education Center/Kennedy Learning Center |
| Annie Lathrup Elementary School | 27700 Southfield Road, Lathrup Village | Built 1927. Became Yeshivat Akiva around 1980. Building is to undergo redevelopment. |
| Fred D. Leonhard Elementary School | 20900 Independence Drive, Southfield | Closed in 2011, sold 2024 to Yeshiva Beth Yehudah. |
| MacArthur Primary & Early Education Center | 19080 West Twelve Mile Road, Southfield | Built 1957. Program moved to Bussey Center in 2020. |
| Magnolia Community Center / Preschool | 16050 Dorset, Southfield | Formerly Magnolia Elementary School. Built 1927. Sold 2024 to Yeshiva Beth Yehudah. |
| McKinley Elementary School | 18330 George Washington, Southfield | Built 1929. Being converted to residential space as of 2024. |
| Marion Simms Elementary School | Pierce Street near Wiltshire, Southfield | Originally called East Southfield Elementary. Closed 1980. Razed 1982 for Simms Park. |
| Glenn Schoenhals Elementary School | 16500 Lincoln, Southfield | Built 1963. Closed 2010. |
| Southfield No. 10 Elementary School | Berg at Ten Mile Road, Southfield | Built 1928. Converted to office space. |
| Southfield Regional Academic Campus (SRAC) | 21705 Evergreen, Southfield | Formerly Brace Elementary School. Being used as temporary site for high school students from University K-12 Academy while it undergoes reconstruction. |
| Vandenberg World Cultures Academy | 16100 Edwards, Southfield | Formerly Vandenberg Elementary School, closed around 2023. Being used as temporary site for elementary students from University K-12 Academy while it undergoes reconstruction. |
