= Glenn S. Anderson =

American politician from Michigan

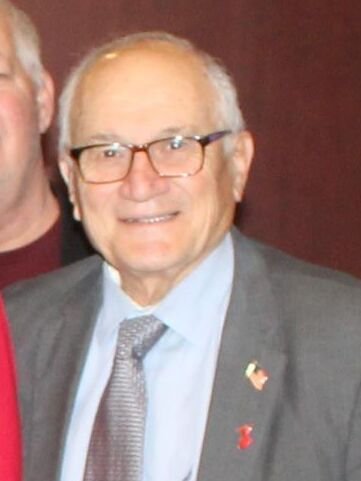
- Anderson in 2024

Member of the Wayne County Commission from the 12th district
- Incumbent
- Assumed office January 7, 2016
- Preceded by: Richard LeBlanc

Member of the Michigan Senate from the 6th district
- In office January 1, 2007 – December 31, 2014
- Preceded by: Laura M. Toy
- Succeeded by: Hoon-Yung Hopgood

Member of the Michigan House of Representatives from the 18th district
- In office January 1, 2001 – December 31, 2006
- Preceded by: Eileen DeHart
- Succeeded by: Richard LeBlanc

Personal details
- Born: February 8, 1954 (age 72) Carthage, Tennessee
- Party: Democratic
- Spouse: Gail
- Profession: realtor and auto worker

Glenn S. Anderson (born February 8, 1954) is a politician from the U.S. state of Michigan. A Democratic, he has served on the Wayne County Commission since 2016. He was previously member of the Michigan Senate from 2007 to 2015 and the Michigan House of Representatives from 2001 to 2007. In the 2012 election, Anderson challenged U.S. House of Representatives member John Conyers in a primary election, after Conyers lost part of his district to redistricting after the 2010 U.S. census.

Anderson lives in Westland with his wife Gail, where they have lived for over 37 years. They have two adult children, Melissa and Kyle, and two grandchildren, Mackenzie and Logan.

== Political career ==
Before entering public service, Anderson was employed by Ford Motor Company and has been a member of the UAW since 1972. He has also been a licensed Realtor since 1979. Prior to his election to the Senate, Anderson represented Michigan's 18th District in the Michigan House of Representatives for six years. Before beginning his tenure in the legislature, Anderson served as Councilman for the City of Westland for nine years.

Over the years Senator Anderson has been active in a number of local organizations, including the Churchill High School PTA, Western Wayne NAACP, Westland Jaycees, Goodfellows, Rouge River Rescue, and Westland Hockey Association. Senator Anderson's focus as a legislator centered on ending bullying in schools, protecting children, strengthening consumer protection and state government transparency and reform of the redistricting process. Anderson was chosen as "Legislator of the Year" by the Michigan Association of Chiefs of Police, the Police Officers Association of Michigan, and the Michigan Hemophilia Association. In addition, he has been recognized by numerous other organizations for his legislative work including the Michigan Association of School Psychologists and the Michigan Municipal League. Anderson is also an alumnus of the National Conference of State Legislature's Bowhay Institute for Legislative Leadership Development and Toll Fellowships.

Anderson was a member of the National Caucus of Environmental Legislators and the Council of State Governments Great Lakes Caucus throughout his legislative career. In 2014, Senator Anderson was invited by the British Embassy, along with four other state legislators from across the United States, to see first-hand the efforts of the United Kingdom to combat global warming.

Anderson left the State Senate on January 1, 2015, due to term limits.

In January, 2016, he was sworn-in as a member of the Wayne County Commission after the Commission's members voted to appoint him to the 12th district seat which had been vacated by Richard LeBlanc. He was elected to a full term in 2016. He was reelected again in 2018, 2020, and 2022.
