= Ross Weaver =

American football player (born 1987)

No. 37
- Position: Cornerback

Personal information
- Born: January 9, 1987 (age 39); Southfield, Michigan, U.S.
- Listed height: 6 ft 1 in (1.85 m)
- Listed weight: 210 lb (95 kg)

Career information
- High school: Southfield (MI)
- College: Michigan State
- NFL draft: 2010: undrafted

Career history
- Miami Dolphins (2010)*; Seattle Seahawks (2010)*; Jacksonville Sharks (2010); Dallas Cowboys (2010–2011)*; Jacksonville Sharks (2011); Detroit Lions (2011−2013)*; New York Giants (2013–2014)*; Arizona Cardinals (2014–2015)*
- * Offseason or practice squad member only
- Stats at Pro Football Reference
- Stats at ArenaFan.com

Ross Weaver (born January 9, 1987) is an American former football cornerback in the National Football League (NFL) for the Seattle Seahawks, Dallas Cowboys, Detroit Lions, New York Giants, and Arizona Cardinals. He was signed by the Miami Dolphins as an undrafted free agent in 2010. He played college football at Michigan State.

== Early life ==
Weaver attended Southfield High School, where he was a three-year starter at free safety. As a junior, he tallied 65 tackles and 2 interceptions. As a senior, he posted 62 tackles, 2 interceptions, 8 passes defensed, 4 receptions for 108 yards (27.0-yard avg.) and one touchdown. He received All-state, All-North, The Detroit News Dream Team and All-Metro Team honors.

== College career ==
Weaver attended Michigan State University. As a freshman, he appeared in 9 out of 11 games, making 8 solo tackles and playing mainly on special teams.

As a sophomore in 2006, he suffered a broken ankle in preseason camp and was granted a medical redshirt. As a redshirt sophomore in 2007, he appeared in 8 games, missing 5 contests with a foot injury. He started 5 games at cornerback. He registered 19 tackles.

As a junior, he started 11 games at cornerback, recording 28 tackles (2.5 for loss) and 7 passes defensed.

As a senior, he appeared in 13 games with one start at cornerback, collecting 31 tackles. In the 2010 Valero Alamo Bowl against Texas Tech, he had 9 tackles, one interception and one forced fumble. He finished his college career after playing in 41 games with 17 starts, making 86 tackles and 12 passes defensed.

== Professional career ==
=== Miami Dolphins ===
Weaver was signed as an undrafted free agent by the Miami Dolphins after the 2010 NFL draft on April 30. He was waived on September 4.

=== Seattle Seahawks ===
On September 6, 2010, he was signed to the Seattle Seahawks practice squad. He was released on September 14.

=== Jacksonville Sharks (first stint) ===
On October 29, 2010, he was signed by the Jacksonville Sharks of the Arena Football League. On November 4, Weaver was placed on league exemption because he was signed by the Dallas Cowboys of the NFL.

=== Dallas Cowboys ===
On November 4, 2010, he was signed to the practice squad of the Dallas Cowboys.

=== Jacksonville Sharks (second stint) ===
On September 29, 2011, he signed with the Jacksonville Sharks of the Arena Football League.

=== Detroit Lions ===
On December 27, 2011, he was signed to the Detroit Lions practice squad. On January 10, 2012, he was signed to a reserve/future contract. On July 26, he was released and later re-signed on July 31. On August 31, he was cut by the Lions. On September 2, he was signed to the practice squad. On September 5, he was released from the practice squad. On December 18, he was re-signed to the practice squad.

On January 1, 2013, he signed a futures contract with the Detroit Lions. On August 23, he was waived/injured by the Lions.

=== New York Giants ===
On November 27, 2013, Weaver was signed by the New York Giants to their practice squad. On December 30, he was signed to a reserve/futures contract by the Giants. He was waived on August 26, 2014.

=== Arizona Cardinals ===
On October 14, 2014, he was signed to the Arizona Cardinals practice squad. On August 29, 2015, he was released by the Cardinals.
