= George A. Blauvelt =

American lawyer and politician

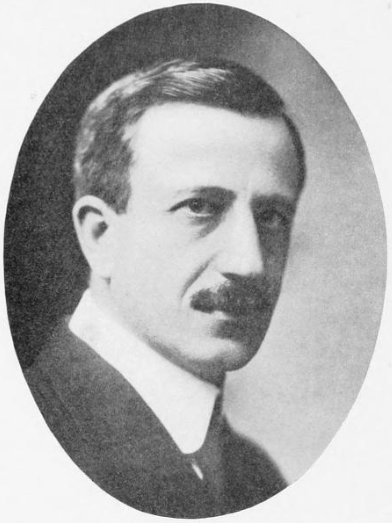

Member of the New York State Senate
- In office 1913–1914

Member of the New York State Assembly
- In office 1911–1912

Personal details
- Born: George Alanson Blauvelt; November 11, 1866 Ramapo, New York, US
- Died: October 16, 1924 (aged 57) Monsey, New York, US
- Party: Democratic
- Education: Cornell University; Columbia Law School
- Occupation: Lawyer, politician

George Alanson Blauvelt (November 11, 1866 – October 16, 1924) was an American lawyer and politician from New York.

== Life ==
He was born in Ramapo, New York, to John Lewis Blauvelt and Lucinda (née Gurnee) Blauvelt. He attended Mt. Chappaqua Institute and graduated from Cornell University in 1890, and from Columbia Law School in 1892.

In 1897, he was sued by William R. Thompson for $50,000 in damages, because Blauvelt had "alienated Thompson's wife's affections".

Blauvelt was a member of the New York State Assembly (Rockland County) in 1911 and 1912, and of the New York State Senate (23rd District) in 1913 and 1914.

In September 1914, he opened a law firm in Manhattan with the New York attorney general, Thomas Carmody, and deputy attorney general, Joseph A. Kellogg, who both had just resigned, but left the firm in October 1915. He was a delegate to the New York State Constitutional Convention of 1915.

He was a trustee of Cornell University from 1919 until his death, on October 16, 1924, at his home in Monsey, New York, of pneumonia.

== Sources ==
- Charles Elliott Fitch, ed. (1911). Official New York from Cleveland to Hughes. Vol. IV. New York and Buffalo: Hurd Publishing Co. p. 360 – via Internet Archive.
- "A Correction for George A. Blauvelt" (PDF). The New York Times. December 20, 1916. p. 12.

New York State Assembly
Preceded by Rutledge I. Odell	New York State Assembly; Rockland County; 1911–1912	Succeeded by Frederick George Grimme
New York State Senate
Preceded by Howard R. Bayne	New York State Senate; 23rd District; 1913–1914	Succeeded by George Cromwell
