= Richard LeBlanc =

American police officer and politician from Michigan

Member of the Michigan House of Representatives from the 18th district
- In office January 1, 2007 – December 31, 2012
- Preceded by: Glenn S. Anderson
- Succeeded by: Sarah Roberts

Personal details
- Born: Westland, Michigan
- Spouse: Cheryl LeBlanc
- Children: 2
- Occupation: Police officer, politician

Richard LeBlanc (born September 1, 1958) is an American politician from Michigan. LeBlanc was a member of the Michigan House of Representatives. In 2006 he was elected to represent Michigan's 18th State House District, which is located in Wayne County and includes the entire city of Westland. Prior to serving in the State House, LeBlanc served as a Westland City Councilman. Following state service, LeBlanc was elected a Wayne County Commissioner for two terms and then as Westland City Clerk for three terms. He also served the Canton Michigan and Walled Lake Michigan Police Departments.

== Early life ==
On September 1, 1958, LeBlanc was born in Westland, Michigan. He is Catholic.

== Career ==
LeBlanc started his career as a police officer in Canton, Michigan.

LeBlanc served as a trustee for Wayne/Westland Community Schools, Board of Education from 1992 to 1995. He was elected to the Westland City Council, where he served from 1995 to 2001 and 2003 to 2006.

In 2006 he filed to run for the seat being vacated by Rep. Glenn S. Anderson, who ran successfully for the Michigan State Senate. LeBlanc won easily in 18th District, which is located in Wayne County and includes the Detroit suburb of Westland. In the House, LeBlanc sits on the Appropriations Committee and was Chairman of the Michigan State Police and the Military and Veterans Affairs Committee.

== Personal life ==
LeBlanc's wife is Cheryl LeBlanc. They have two children. LeBlanc and his family live in Westland, Michigan.

Michigan House of Representatives
Preceded by Incumbent	Michigan House of Representatives for District 18 Richard LeBlanc (D); 2007–Present	Succeeded by Incumbent
