= Lathrup Village, Michigan =

- City
- City of Lathrup Village
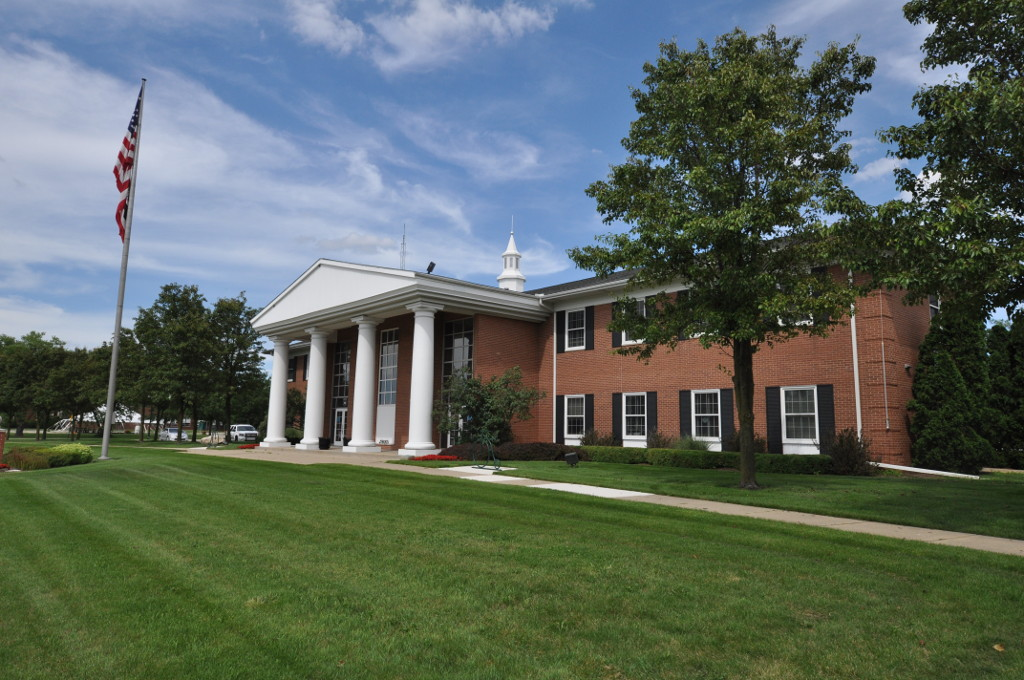
- Lathrup Village City Hall

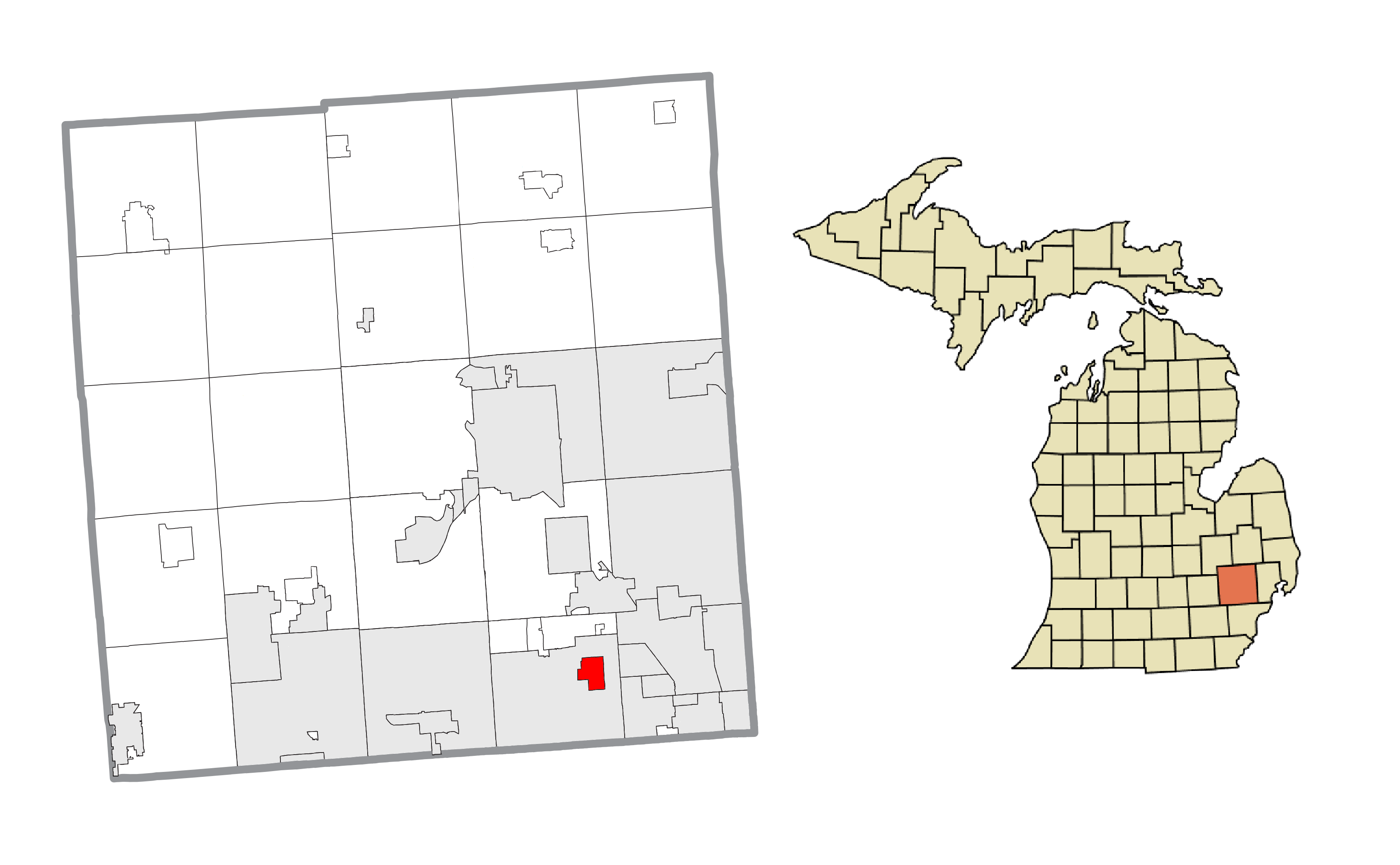
- Location within Oakland County

- Location within the state of Michigan
- Coordinates: 42°29′47″N 83°13′22″W
- Country: United States
- State: Michigan
- County: Oakland
- Organized: 1923
- Incorporated: 1953

Government
  - Type: Council–manager
  - Mayor: Kelly Garrett
  - Clerk: Yvette Talley

Area
  - City: 1.51 sq mi (3.90 km^{2})
  - Land: 1.51 sq mi (3.90 km^{2})
  - Water: 0 sq mi (0.00 km^{2})
- Elevation: 705 ft (215 m)

Population (2020)
  - City: 4,088
  - Density: 2,713.6/sq mi (1,047.74/km^{2})
  - Metro: 4,296,250 (Metro Detroit)
- Time zone: UTC-5 (EST)
  - Summer (DST): UTC-4 (EDT)
- ZIP code(s): 48076 (Southfield)
- Area code: 248
- FIPS code: 26-46320
- GNIS feature ID: 0630184
- Website: Official website

The City of Lathrup Village (/ˈleɪθrəp/ LAY-thrəp) is a city in Oakland County in the U.S. state of Michigan. An inner-ring suburb of Detroit, Lathrup Village lies roughly 17 miles (27.4 km) north of downtown Detroit, and is entirely surrounded by the larger city of Southfield. As of the 2020 census, the city had a population of 4,088.

== History ==
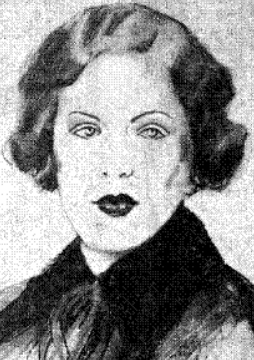
Louise Lathrup Kelley

The city of Lathrup Village is an outgrowth of the development known as Lathrup Townsite, the dream of its developer Louise Lathrup Kelley. In 1923 she purchased a tract of 1,000 acres (4 km^{2}) in Southfield Township, in southern Oakland County, and proceeded to plant a residential neighborhood that encompasses the city of 1.5 square miles (3.9 km^{2}). Lathrup Townsite was conceived as a controlled community with rigorous standards, including houses built only of masonry construction; early integration of attached garages; as well as established minimums for construction cost to ensure quality. The community also had housing covenants to prevent the sale of homes to African American families, part of a larger trend in the mid-20th century of white Detroiters fleeing to the suburbs to avoid living near black residents (see white flight). As the community developed, Mrs. Kelley implemented numerous innovative directives, including operating a shuttle service to local shopping areas, and allowing the financing of automobiles as part of the financing of houses, which created a stronger connection between the relatively isolated townsite and more established suburbs, as well as the city of Detroit. Mr. Charles Kelley, who had been a real estate writer for the Detroit News, assisted his wife in bringing talented architects to the community to design many of the custom homes that are features of the community. The City of Lathrup Village was incorporated in 1953 as the first incorporated community in Southfield Township. The residents thwarted an attempt by township residents to include Lathrup Townsite in their planned incorporation of the city of Southfield, resulting in Southfield's incorporation being delayed until 1958. Louise Lathrup Kelley played an active role in the new city until her death in 1963, after which her remaining real estate holdings in the city were sold and developed.

=== Lathrup Village Historic District ===
In 1998 much of Lathrup Village was included on the National Register of Historic Places as the Lathrup Village Historic District. The district includes approximately 1,200 properties, primarily residential, that reflect characteristic housing styles from the first half of the 20th century. These include Colonial Revival, Tudor and ranch houses. According to the Michigan State Historic Preservation Office: “The district possesses a strong geometric street pattern integrated with curvilinear patterns that provide a rural character. This layering of patterns produces octagonal, circular and semi-circular focal points and a series of small triangular parks scattered throughout the district. It also creates unique and changing perspectives, as views of significant buildings suddenly appear at surprising moments. Likewise, at the uniquely configured intersections of many streets, one is met with a new perspective as suddenly several sections of the district become visible.” The developer of the district was Louise Lathrup Kelley. According to the Michigan State Historic Preservation Office “As a woman acting as developer starting in the 1920s, she was essentially alone, however her dogged persistence and insistence on quality resulted in a unique community that was the summation of her career.”

== Geography ==
According to the United States Census Bureau, the city has a total area of 1.50 square miles (3.88 km^{2}), all land.

== Demographics ==
Historical population
Census	Pop.	Note	%±
1960	3,556		—
1970	4,676		31.5%
1980	4,639		−0.8%
1990	4,329		−6.7%
2000	4,236		−2.1%
2010	4,075		−3.8%
2020	4,088		0.3%
U.S. Decennial Census; 2010 2020

=== Racial and ethnic composition ===
Lathrup Village city, Michigan – Racial and ethnic composition Note: the US Census treats Hispanic/Latino as an ethnic category. This table excludes Latinos from the racial categories and assigns them to a separate category. Hispanics/Latinos may be of any race.
Race / Ethnicity (NH = Non-Hispanic)	Pop 2000	Pop 2010	Pop 2020	% 2000	% 2010	% 2020
White alone (NH)	1,963	1,373	1,236	46.34%	33.69%	30.23%
Black or African American alone (NH)	2,106	2,481	2,548	49.72%	60.88%	62.33%
Native American or Alaska Native alone (NH)	4	4	9	0.09%	0.10%	0.22%
Asian alone (NH)	26	24	34	0.61%	0.59%	0.83%
Native Hawaiian or Pacific Islander alone (NH)	0	0	2	0.00%	0.00%	0.05%
Other race alone (NH)	5	13	17	0.12%	0.32%	0.42%
Mixed race or Multiracial (NH)	92	119	151	2.17%	2.92%	3.69%
Hispanic or Latino (any race)	40	61	91	0.94%	1.50%	2.23%
Total	4,236	4,075	4,088	100.00%	100.00%	100.00%

=== 2020 census ===
As of the 2020 census, Lathrup Village had a population of 4,088. The median age was 49.6 years. 15.9% of residents were under the age of 18 and 23.8% were 65 years of age or older. For every 100 females, there were 88.9 males, and for every 100 females age 18 and over, there were 86.7 males age 18 and over.

100.0% of residents lived in urban areas, while 0.0% lived in rural areas.

There were 1,651 households, of which 25.4% had children under the age of 18 living in them. Of all households, 52.2% were married-couple households, 14.1% were households with a male householder and no spouse or partner present, and 29.3% were households with a female householder and no spouse or partner present. About 23.7% of all households were made up of individuals, and 11.5% had someone living alone who was 65 years of age or older.

There were 1,708 housing units, of which 3.3% were vacant. The homeowner vacancy rate was 1.1%, and the rental vacancy rate was 9.1%.

=== 2010 census ===
As of the census of 2010, there were 4,075 people, 1,610 households, and 1,157 families residing in the city. The population density was 2,716.7 inhabitants per square mile (1,048.9/km^{2}). There were 1,698 housing units at an average density of 1,132.0 per square mile (437.1/km^{2}). The racial makeup of the city was 34.6% White, 61.2% African American, 0.1% Native American, 0.6% Asian, 0.5% from other races, and 3.1% from two or more races. Hispanic or Latino of any race were 1.5% of the population.

There were 1,610 households, of which 30.4% had children under the age of 18 living with them, 55.1% were married couples living together, 13.3% had a female householder with no husband present, 3.5% had a male householder with no wife present, and 28.1% were non-families. 22.4% of all households were made up of individuals, and 8.4% had someone living alone who was 65 years of age or older. The average household size was 2.53 and the average family size was 2.99.

The median age in the city was 45.8 years. 20.9% of residents were under the age of 18; 6.4% were between the ages of 18 and 24; 21.2% were from 25 to 44; 36.1% were from 45 to 64; and 15.3% were 65 years of age or older. The gender makeup of the city was 48.0% male and 52.0% female.

=== 2000 census ===
As of the census of 2000, there were 4,236 people, 1,621 households, and 1,207 families residing in the city. The population density was 2,806.1 inhabitants per square mile (1,083.4/km^{2}). There were 1,647 housing units at an average density of 1,091.0 per square mile (421.2/km^{2}). The racial makeup of the city was 49.81% African American, 47.03% White, 0.09% Native American, 0.61% Asian, 0.21% from other races, and 2.24% from two or more races. Hispanic or Latino of any race were 0.94% of the population.

There were 1,621 households, out of which 33.6% had children under the age of 18 living with them, 60.9% were married couples living together, 9.9% had a female householder with no husband present, and 25.5% were non-families. 21.5% of all households were made up of individuals, and 8.1% had someone living alone who was 65 years of age or older. The average household size was 2.60 and the average family size was 3.05.

In the city, the population was spread out, with 24.6% under the age of 18, 5.4% from 18 to 24, 28.8% from 25 to 44, 29.0% from 45 to 64, and 12.2% who were 65 years of age or older. The median age was 40 years. For every 100 females, there were 95.8 males. For every 100 females age 18 and over, there were 90.6 males. The median income for a household in the city was $89,303, and the median income for a family was $98,213. Males had a median income of $65,641 versus $49,375 for females. The per capita income for the city was $35,998. About 1.5% of families and 2.7% of the population were below the poverty line, including 3.8% of those under age 18 and none of those age 65 or over.

== Education ==
The city is within Southfield Public School District; it formerly housed Southfield-Lathrup High School. University High School and MacArhur K-8 School are located in Lathrup Village. Southfield High School for the Arts & Technology and McIntyre Elementary, in Southfield, are in the District.

=== Annie Lathrup School ===
Lathrup Village was formerly served by the Annie Lathrup School, an elementary school located on Southfield Rd. in the center of the city. The school was built in 1926 and opened in 1927, opposite the Town Hall Sales Office, in an effort to give Lathrup Village a focal point. The building originally had four classrooms, a kindergarten, and a gymnasium. Additional classrooms were built in the 1950s. It was incorporated into the Southfield Public School system, and eventually closed in the late 1970s.

The school building is Lathrup Village's only historical landmark. According to the city's Economic Development Strategy, "With the demolition of the town hall in the 1990s, the school remains the only historic structure on Southfield Road." The Lathrup Village Redevelopment Report relates that "The Annie Lathrup School was included in the Lathrup Village Local Historic District when it was established in 1999" and "is listed on the National Register of Historic Places." All existing efforts to redevelop the city center of Lathrup Village must contend with the difficult question of how to treat this building, and as such none of the many redevelopment plans have been accepted.

The school was named for Annie Lathrup (1861–1954), mother of developer Louise Lathrup Kelley. The school mascot was a beaver, and the sports teams were known as the Lathrup Beavers. Muriel Stacey established the library at the school.

Mark Howe, Marty Howe, and the rest of Gordie Howe's children attended the school.

After the school was closed, the building was purchased by Yeshivat Akiva, which was based there until 1999. In the late 1990s the building was sold to a real estate developer, who hoped to use the land for a shopping center. The residents of Lathrup Village protested against this plan and instead another academic organization, the Academy of America, rented the building and opened a branch called The Academy of Lathrup Village. As of December 2013 the building was up for lease.

== Notable people ==
- Kelly Garrett is the first African-American mayor of Lathrup Village.
- Nick Plummer (born 1996) is a professional baseball outfielder for the New York Mets of Major League Baseball (MLB).
