= Herbert Franklin Sheldon =

American politician

Herbert Franklin Sheldon (c. 1831–1917) was an American politician and real estate businessman in Ottawa, Kansas. He served as Ottawa's mayor and was a state senator.

Sheldon arrived in Ottawa in 1864. He was elected mayor of Ottawa in 1872. He also served as county clerk and register of deeds.

Panoramic map of Ottawa, Kansas from 1872 with image of Ludington House inset

Sheldon rescued the hotel project that became Henry Hutchins Ludington's Ludington House Hotel in Ottawa and funded the building's completion. He built his residence next to it. It is now known as Gillette House and is part of Ottawa University. Built as a residence for Sheldon, it was used as a dormitory by the university and called Sheldon Hall. It is at 718 South Cedar Street.

Ludington House housed the First National Bank and a post office.

Sheldon was president of the Temperance League and was an advocate for prohibition, helping lead the effort that made the county "dry" in his lifetime.

The H. F. Sheldon building in Ottawa is 2-story Italianate brick building at 324 South Main Street was built in 1887. It is a contributing property to a historic district.

Sheldon wrote Reminiscences of My Dealings with Criminals in the Early History of Franklin County, Kansas in 1916.

He was a member of the Kansas State Senate in 1899. He was a Republican.

His first two wives and several children died. He was a trustee of Ottawa University. His brother Dwin M. Sheldon was a prominent businessman in Ottawa.
