= John Grace School =

- U.S. National Register of Historic Places
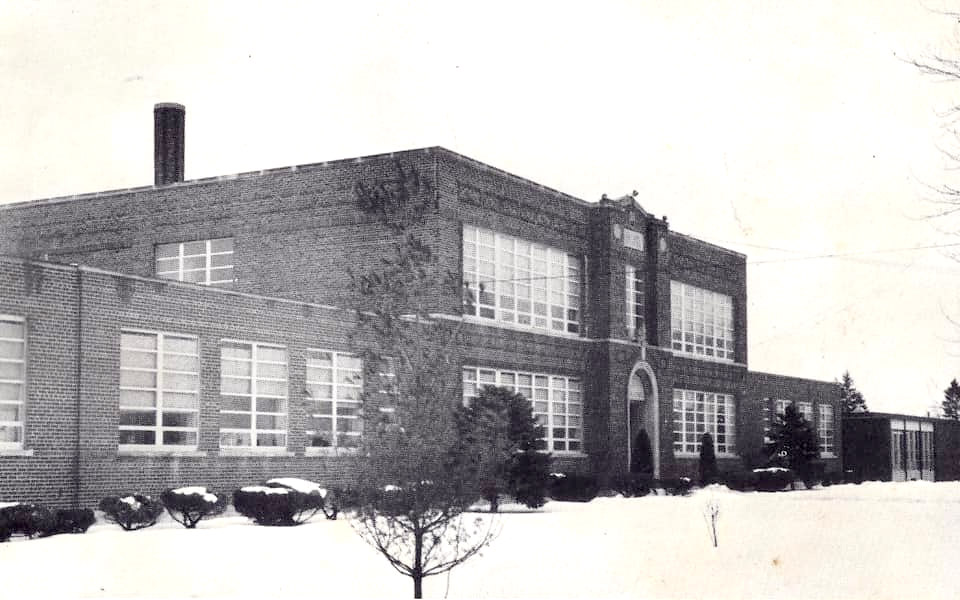
- John Grace School in 1969

- Location within Michigan Location within the United States
- Interactive map
- Location: 21030 Indian St., Southfield, Michigan
- Coordinates: 42°26′44″N 83°18′42″W
- Built: 1921
- Architect: Van Leyen, Schilling, & Keough; Jensen & Keough; Dolgner, Rollason & Rokicki
- Architectural style: Colonial Revival
- NRHP reference No.: 100008828
- Added to NRHP: April 6, 2023

The John Grace School, also known as the District No. 9 Public School or the John Grace Park and Community Center, is a former school located at 21030 Indian Street in Southfield, Michigan. It was listed on the National Register of Historic Places in 2023.

== History ==
The residents of Southfield Township first organized their school districts in 1824. The township was divided into ten separate districts, plus four fractional districts eventually combined with neighboring townships. Each district built their own one-room schoolhouse for students through grade 8; District 9 constructed its school on Beech Road. In 1921, District 9 decided to replace the previous school with a new brick building designed by the Detroit architectural firm Van Leyen, Shilling, & Keough. This original building was a single story tall and contained four ungraded classrooms.

In 1929, a second story containing an additional four classrooms was added onto the existing building. A rear addition was constructed in 1942. In 1947, the Southfield school districts were consolidated, and the John Grace School was used as an elementary school by the consolidated district. A 1949 addition added a kindergarten room, kitchen, and storage to the building. Due to expanding population in the area, more additions were constricted in 1953, 1958, and 1962.

However, by the 1970s, declining population in the area decreased the student attendance, and the school was closed in 1980. The City of Southfield took possession of the building in 1985, and turned it into a branch library and community center. The community center was closed in 2017.

As of 2022, the city of Southfield was considering renovating the building into affordable senior housing.

== Description ==
The John Grace School is a red brick Colonial Revival structure, composed of a central two-story section and six one-story additions. The main structure and the additions create an E-shaped footprint.

The front of the two-story section has a narrow, slightly protruding central bay containing the entrance. Wide classroom bays are on each side. Brick soldier courses run across the facade at the second-floor windowsill and lintel levels; an additional limestone band is at the second-floor windowsill level. Limestone also caps the parapet wall.

The central entrance bay contains a limestone arched opening housing two doors. A limestone arched spandrel, engraved with "District No. 9 Public School," is above the door transoms. The second floor level contains a pair of windows. A pediment above contains and engraved limestone plaque reading "John Grace School." The wide classroom bays on each side contain large openings on both floors with seven windows each.

== See also ==
- National Register of Historic Places listings in Oakland County, Michigan
