= Suel A. Sheldon =

American politician

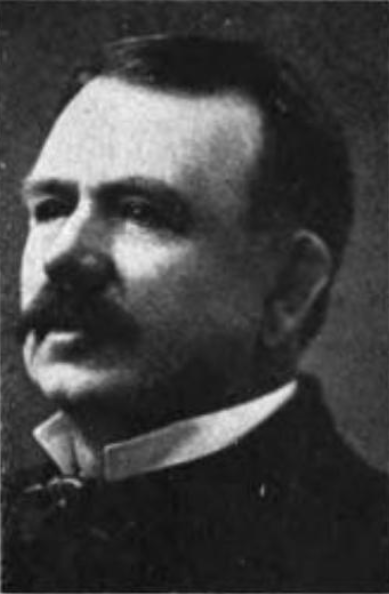

Member of the Michigan Senate from the 23rd district
- In office 1899–1900
- Preceded by: William Savidge
- Succeeded by: William D. Kelly
- In office 1905–1906
- Preceded by: William D. Kelly
- Succeeded by: Luke Lugers

Personal details
- Born: December 6, 1850 Hustisford, Wisconsin
- Died: October 28, 1926 (aged 75) Grand Rapids, Michigan
- Party: Republican
- Spouse: Eleanor Gear

Suel Andrews Sheldon (December 6, 1850 – October 28, 1926) was a member of the Michigan Senate.

== Biography ==
Suel Andrews Sheldon was born in the Town of Hustisford, Wisconsin. In 1879, he married Eleanor Gear.

== Career ==
Sheldon was a member of the Senate from 1899 to 1900 and again from 1905 to 1906. In 1912, he ran for the United States House of Representatives from Michigan's 5th congressional district, losing to Carl E. Mapes.

Sheldon later operated several farms to the west of Grand Rapids, Michigan. He died at Butterworth Hospital in that city on October 28, 1926.
