= Edgar Fredricks =

American politician and diplomat

Edgar J. Fredricks
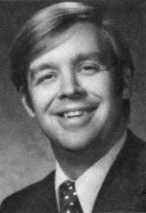

Member of the Michigan Senate from the 23rd district
- In office January 1, 1979 – December 31, 1990
- Preceded by: Gary Byker

Member of the Michigan House of Representatives from the 54th district
- In office January 1, 1975 – December 31, 1978
- Preceded by: James S. Farnsworth
- Succeeded by: Paul Hillegonds

Personal details
- Born: June 27, 1942 Holland, Michigan
- Died: March 31, 2016 (aged 73)
- Party: Republican
- Education: Western Michigan University; Calvin College

Edgar J. Fredricks (June 27, 1942 – March 31, 2016) was a Republican member of the Michigan Legislature from 1975 through 1990.

Fredricks was an aide to Congressman Guy Vander Jagt, and was executive director of President Richard Nixon's Michigan campaign in 1968. He was later in diplomatic service, as vice consul in the U.S. Embassy in South Korea and as a political officer in the Bureau of International Organization Affairs at the State Department.

Fredricks unsuccessfully challenged Fred Upton in the primary for Congress in 1990.
