= Southfield High School =

High school in Southfield, Michigan, United States

Southfield High School for the Arts and Technology

Location
- 24675 Lahser Road; Southfield, Michigan; United States; 42°28′12″N 83°15′43″W

Information
- Type: Public school
- Established: 1951 as Southfield High School
- School district: Southfield Public Schools
- Principal: David Reese
- Teaching staff: 61.74 (FTE)
- Grades: 9–12
- Enrollment: 1,190 (2023–2024)
- Student to teacher ratio: 19.27
- Colors: Red, white and blue
- Nickname: Warriors (previously Blue Jays)
- Website: southfieldat.southfieldk12.org

Student assessments
- 2021–22 school year Change vs. prior year

M-STEP 11th grade proficiency rates (Science / Social Studies)
- Advanced %: ≤5 / ≤5
- Proficient %: – / –
- PR. Proficient %: 13.3 / 55.7
- Not Proficient %: 79.1 / 35.1

Average test scores
- SAT Total: 810.5 (▼ −58.8)

Southfield High School for the Arts and Technology is a public high school located in Southfield, Michigan. The school was founded in 1951. It serves grades 9–12 for the Southfield Public Schools.

== Notable alumni ==
- Rose Abdoo (Class of 1980), actress known for Gilmore Girls
- Bill Adler (Class of 1969), music journalist and former publicist
- Caleb Banks (Class of 2021), NFL defensive end for the Minnesota Vikings
- Andrew Bowler (Class of 1991), filmmaker known for writing and directing the short Time Freak and the its 2018 film adaption
- Torin Dorn (Class of 1986), former NFL player selected by the Los Angeles Raiders in the 4th round of the 1990 draft
- Michael Flowers (Class of 2017), basketball player
- Amauri Hardy (9th and 10th grade), NBA G League basketball player
- Nic Jones, NFL cornerback for the New York Giants
- Kathy Kosins, singer and artist
- Lawrence Lamont, filmmaker known for directing One of Them Days and co-writing CornerStore
- Keith Lee (Class of 2014), social media personality, food critic, and mixed martial artist
- Kevin Lee (Class of 2010), MMA fighter and UFC lightweight contender
- Isaiah Marshall (Class of 2024), NCAA quarterback for the Kansas Jayhawks
- Renisha McBride (Class of 2012), victim of gun violence in 2013
- Malik McDowell (Class of 2014), NFL defensive tackle selected in the second round of the 2017 draft
- Rob Meyerson (Class of 1983), aerospace engineer
- Ira Newble (Class of 1993), former NBA player
- Chukwuma Okorafor (Class of 2014), NFL offensive tackle for the New York Jets
- Spencer Overton (Class of 1986), law professor and voting rights expert
- Karriem Riggins (dropped out in 11th grade c. 1992), jazz drummer, record producer, DJ, and songwriter
- Bobby Scales, former MLB second baseman
- Debbie Schlussel (Class of 1986), attorney and political commentator
- Freddie Scott Jr., former NFL wide receiver
- Robert Shiller (Class of 1963), economist and 2013 Nobel Prize in Economics winner
- Ted Simmons (Class of 1967), former MLB player and 2020 inductee into the Baseball Hall of Fame. SHS' athletic field (baseball diamond) is dedicated to Simmons.
- Rick Titsworth aka Rick Worthy (Class of 1985), actor known for The Magnificent Seven
- Nayo Wallace, actress
- Gabriel Watson (Class of 2002), former NFL defensive tackle selected by the Arizona Cardinals in the 4th round of the 2006 draft
- Ross Weaver (Class of 2005), former NFL player
