= Johann Wilhelm Hertel =

German composer, harpsichordist and violinist (1727 - 1789)

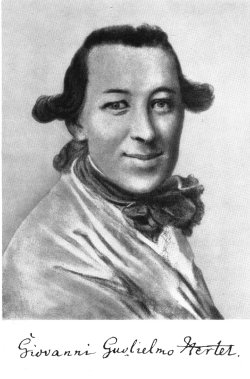
Johann Wilhelm Hertel.

Johann Wilhelm Hertel (9 October 1727 – 14 June 1789) was a German composer, harpsichord and violin player.

He was born in Eisenach, into a family of musicians. His father, Johann Christian Hertel (1697–1754) was Konzertmeister (from 1733) and director of music at the Eisenach court, while his grandfather, Jakob Christian Hertel (c. 1667-c. 1726), had been Kapellmeister in Oettingen and later Merseburg. At an early age Johann Wilhelm accompanied his father, an accomplished viola da gamba player, on tour at the harpsichord. He also learned the violin, which he studied with Franz Benda. In 1742 he came with his father to Mecklenburg-Strelitz where he was active playing both instruments. Among his pupils there was Carl Friedrich Christian Fasch (1736–1800). After further music studies in Zerbst and Berlin, Hertel moved to the Duchy of Mecklenburg-Schwerin, where he made a successful career, initially as principal and later becoming court composer, and likewise undertaking teaching. During the reign of Duke Christian Ludwig II, Hertel wrote primarily representative instrumental music, while during the reign of his successor, Frederick II (called 'the pious') he focused on sacred music. In 1770 he was appointed court counsellor and served also as private secretary to princess Ulrike. He died in Schwerin.

Hertel wrote a great number of symphonies, solo concertos, harpsichord sonatas, songs, hymns, cantatas, and oratorios. Much of his work is in the galant style, transitional between Baroque and Classical, and he is considered an important representative of the 'emotional style' (empfindsamer Stil) of the German pre-Classical era.

== Works ==
- Sei Sonate per Cembalo, Op. 1, Nürnberg, 1756
- Concerto for trumpet and oboe (double concerto) in E flat major
- Bassoon Concerto in A minor
- Oboe Concerto in G minor
- Trumpet Concerto in E-flat major
- Sonata a Quattro for two horns and two bassoons (in E flat)
- Concerto for 8 kettledrums, wind and strings
- Concerto a cinque in D for trumpet, two oboes and two bassoons
- Christmas oratorio "Die Geburt Jesu Christi" recorded by Die Kölner Akademie, conducted by Michael Alexander Willens on CPO
- Easter Passion cantata "Der sterbende Heiland" recorded by Die Kölner Akademie, conducted by Michael Alexander Willens on CPO
- Concerto per la Harpa ó Cembalo F-Major
- Concerto per la Harpa ó Cembalo D-Major
- Concerto per la Harpa ó Cembalo G-Major
- Cello Concerto in A major (1755), recorded by Musica Viva and Alexander Rudin on CHANDOS
- Cello Concerto in A minor (1759), recorded by Musica Viva and Alexander Rudin on CHANDOS

== See also ==
- Carl Heinrich Graun
