= Johann Christian Hertel =

German composer, violinist and a virtuoso performer

Johann Christian Hertel (born 25 June 1697 or 1699 in Oettingen; died October 1754 in Strelitz) was a German composer, violinist and a virtuoso performer on the viola da gamba.

== Life ==
Hertel was the only son of Jakob Christian Hertel, who was kapellmeister in Oettingen and later Merseburg. He taught himself to play the violin, and learned to play the keyboard from the court organist in Merseburg, Georg Friedrich Kauffmann. After quitting his studies of theology in Halle (Saale), he was awarded a scholarship from Duke Moritz Wilhelm of Saxe-Merseburg to travel to Darmstadt to study with the famous viola da gamba virtuoso Ernst Christian Hesse. From 1718 to 1741 he was concertmaster in Eisenach. Later, from 1742 to its dissolution in 1753, he was concertmaster at the court of the duchy of Mecklenburg-Strelitz in Neustrelitz. As a player of the viola da gamba, he traveled to Dresden, Kassel, Weimar, Braunschweig, Meiningen, Gotha, and Berlin, to name a few. His compositions include many violin concerti, keyboard concerti, symphonies, overture-suites and trio sonatas. Much of his work is either lost or has not been printed.

Hertel's exact date of death is not ascertainable due to missing church records from both Strelitz and Neustrelitz. As a place of death, the royal residence town of Neustrelitz would be more plausible, where the court and court orchestra were located. Both the town of Neustrelitz and the entire region of Mecklenburg-Strelitz were abbreviated to "Strelitz" in contemporary usage.

Hertel's son, Johann Wilhelm also became a composer, as did his son-in-law Markus Heinrich Grauel.
