= Curtis Hertel Jr. =

American politician (born 1978)

Curtis Hertel
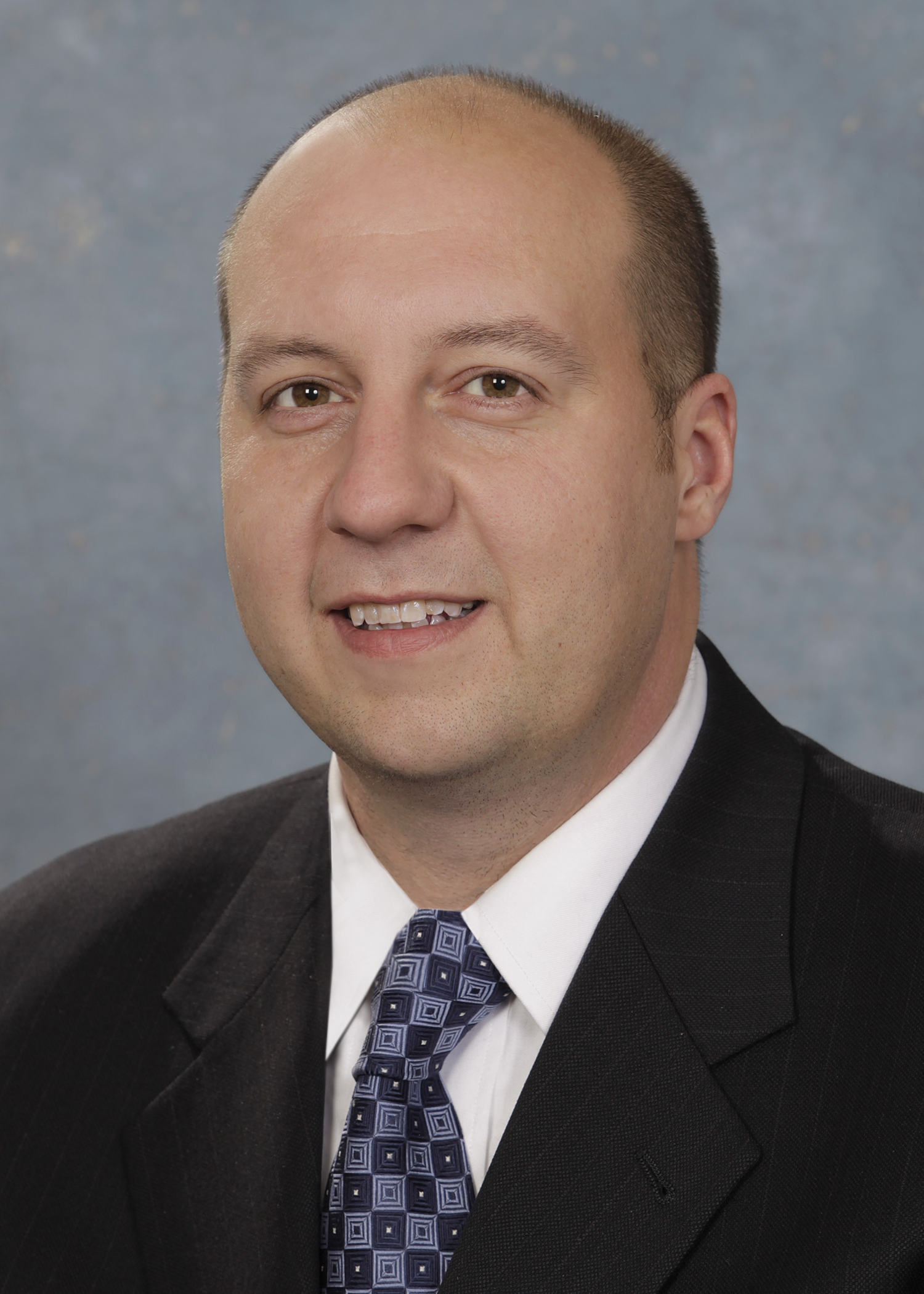
- Hertel in 2014

Chair of the Michigan Democratic Party
- Incumbent
- Assumed office February 22, 2025
- Preceded by: Lavora Barnes

Member of the Michigan Senate from the 23rd district
- In office January 1, 2015 – December 31, 2022
- Preceded by: Gretchen Whitmer
- Succeeded by: Jim Runestad

Personal details
- Born: January 9, 1978 (age 48) Detroit, Michigan, U.S.
- Party: Democratic
- Spouse: Elizabeth Hertel
- Children: 4
- Relatives: Curtis Hertel (father); Kevin Hertel (brother); Dennis Hertel (uncle); John Hertel (uncle)
- Education: Michigan State University (BA)
- Website: Campaign website

Curtis Hertel Jr. (born January 9, 1978) is an American politician currently serving as the chair of the Michigan Democratic Party. He previously served as a state senator from 2015 to 2023 for the 23rd district, representing the Greater Lansing Area.

Hertel is a member of the Democratic Party. He previously served two terms as the Ingham County Register of Deeds, and more recently served as Governor Gretchen Whitmer's top lobbyist. He was the Democratic nominee for Michigan's 7th congressional district in the 2024 election, losing the general election to Tom Barrett.

He is the son of Curtis Hertel, who was co-speaker of the Michigan House of Representatives from 1993 to 1994. Hertel's brother, Kevin Hertel, was elected to the Michigan State Senate in November 2022.

== Education and early career ==
Hertel holds a bachelor's degree from James Madison College at Michigan State University, where he attended from 1996 to 2000. Hertel served on the Ingham County Board of Commissioners from 2001 to 2008, representing the north half of East Lansing and Meridian Township. From 2005 to 2008, Hertel worked as a Legislative Liaison for the Department of Community Health under Governor Jennifer Granholm.

Hertel was elected Ingham County Register of Deeds in 2008, and re-elected to a second term in 2012. As Register of Deeds, Hertel filed a lawsuit against mortgage firms Fannie Mae and Freddie Mac in 2011, seeking millions in unpaid taxes on property transfers in the county. The outcome is still pending.

== State senate ==
Hertel was elected to the Michigan State Senate in 2014, where he served as the Minority Whip and Chairperson for the Democratic Caucus Campaign Committee. He served as senator for the 23rd district in Michigan, which represented the cities of Lansing and East Lansing, as well as the townships of Alaiedon Township, Michigan, Aurelius, Bunker Hill, Delhi, Ingham, Lansing, Leslie, Meridian, Onondaga, Vevay, Stockbridge, and White Oak.

He introduced bills to offer tax credits to Michigan college graduates who elected to remain residents of the state after graduation. He also introduced legislation to require discussions on affirmative consent in high school sex education classes. In March 2016, he introduced a bill to put $3 million into the First Responder Presumed Coverage Fund, which would give money to firefighters who develop cancer due to chemical exposure on the job.

In November 2018, Hertel was re-elected to the 23rd district in the Michigan State Senate, where he served four more years. Hertel served as the top-ranking Democrat on the Senate Appropriations Committee.

== Political career ==
Due to term limits, Hertel was ineligible for re-election in 2022. He joined the gubernatorial administration of Gretchen Whitmer as Whitmer's top lobbyist in the role of director of legislative affairs. He announced his resignation from the Whitmer administration on June 30, 2023. Less than a week after resigning from the Whitmer administration, where he had negotiated the state's $82 billion budget, Hertel took a role at the nonprofit Greater Flint Health Coalition, which was expected to benefit from the state budget in the form of a $1.5 million grant. Hertel denied that his involvement in the state budget included knowledge of the $1.5 million budget appropriation earmarked for the Greater Flint Health Coalition. According to The Detroit News, the arrangement "puts a spotlight on the close, behind-the-scenes relationships between groups seeking assistance from state government and officials in positions to provide it."

On July 10, 2023, Hertel announced his candidacy for Michigan's 7th congressional district, which was held by Elissa Slotkin, who had already announced her candidacy for the U.S. Senate. Hertel was defeated in the general election by Tom Barrett.

In February 2025, Hertel was elected chair of the Michigan Democratic Party. Hertel ran unopposed after his only opponent dropped out due to not collecting enough signatures. Responding to efforts to reduce the impact of money in politics, Hertel expressed he could not see how the party could deny a voice to people with money under First Amendment grounds, saying "Citizens United was pretty specific about what the laws are."

On November 1, 2026, Hertel announced that Haley Stevens was no longer a member of the Michigan Democratic Party.

== Personal life ==
His wife, Elizabeth, serves as Michigan's Department of Health and Human Services director.

Party political offices
Preceded by Lavora Barnes	Chair of the Michigan Democratic Party; 2025–present	Incumbent
