= Aurelius Township, Michigan =

- Civil township
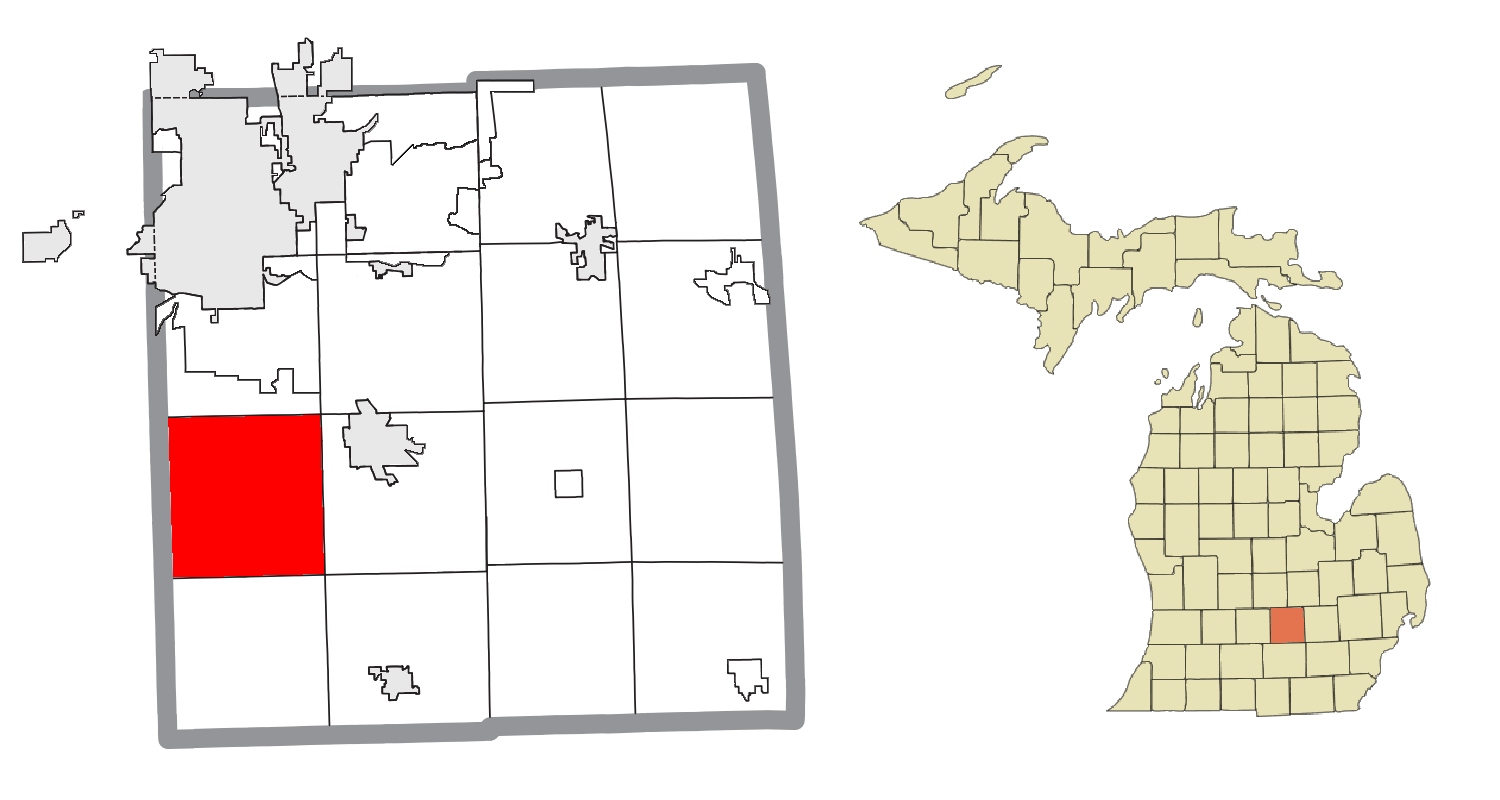
- Location within Ingham County

- Location within the state of Michigan Location within the United States
- Coordinates: 42°33′22″N 84°32′47″W
- Country: United States
- State: Michigan
- County: Ingham
- Established: 1837

Government
  - Supervisor: Larry Silsby
  - Clerk: Tracy Ayres

Area
  - Total: 36.47 sq mi (94.46 km^{2})
  - Land: 36.41 sq mi (94.30 km^{2})
  - Water: 0.062 sq mi (0.16 km^{2})
- Elevation: 915 ft (279 m)

Population (2020)
  - Total: 4,354
  - Density: 119.6/sq mi (46.17/km^{2})
- Time zone: UTC-5 (Eastern (EST))
  - Summer (DST): UTC-4 (EDT)
- ZIP code(s): 48827 (Eaton Rapids); 48854 (Mason)
- Area code: 517
- FIPS code: 26-04240
- GNIS feature ID: 1625864
- Website: Official website

Aurelius Township is a civil township of Ingham County in the U.S. state of Michigan. As of the 2020 census, the township population was 4,354, a significant increase from 3,525 at the 2010 census.

== Communities ==
- Aurelius is an unincorporated community in the township at 42°31′27″N 84°31′20″W.
- North Aurelius is an unincorporated community in the township at 42°34′55″N 84°32′35″W.

== Geography ==
According to the United States Census Bureau, the township has a total area of 36.47 square miles (94.46 km^{2}), of which 36.41 square miles (94.30 km^{2}) is land and 0.06 square miles (0.16 km^{2}) (0.16%) is water.

== Demographics ==
As of the census of 2000, there were 3,318 people, 1,130 households, and 939 families residing in the township. The population density was 90.9 inhabitants per square mile (35.1/km^{2}). There were 1,153 housing units at an average density of 31.6 per square mile (12.2/km^{2}). The racial makeup of the township was 96.50% White, 0.63% African American, 0.39% Native American, 0.27% Asian, 0.81% from other races, and 1.39% from two or more races. Hispanic or Latino of any race were 3.62% of the population.

There were 1,130 households, out of which 40.2% had children under the age of 18 living with them, 74.4% were married couples living together, 5.3% had a female householder with no husband present, and 16.9% were non-families. 13.7% of all households were made up of individuals, and 4.4% had someone living alone who was 65 years of age or older. The average household size was 2.93 and the average family size was 3.24.

In the township the population was spread out, with 29.0% under the age of 18, 6.8% from 18 to 24, 28.8% from 25 to 44, 27.3% from 45 to 64, and 8.0% who were 65 years of age or older. The median age was 38 years. For every 100 females, there were 101.3 males. For every 100 females age 18 and over, there were 100.1 males.

The median income for a household in the township was $62,750, and the median income for a family was $69,712. Males had a median income of $45,341 versus $30,959 for females. The per capita income for the township was $22,983. About 1.9% of families and 3.9% of the population were below the poverty line, including 3.1% of those under age 18 and 1.3% of those age 65 or over.
