= Curtis Hertel =

American politician

64th Speaker of the Michigan House of Representatives
- In office January 8, 1997 – December 31, 1998
- Preceded by: Paul Hillegonds
- Succeeded by: Charles R. Perricone

Co-Speaker of the Michigan House of Representatives
- In office January 13, 1993 – December 31, 1994 Serving with Paul Hillegonds
- Governor: John Engler
- Preceded by: Lew Dodak
- Succeeded by: Paul Hillegonds

Member of the Michigan House of Representatives
- In office January 1, 1981 – December 31, 1998
- Preceded by: Dennis M. Hertel
- Succeeded by: LaMar Lemmons III
- Constituency: 12th district (1981–1992); 2nd district (1993–1998)

Personal details
- Born: March 7, 1953 Detroit, Michigan, U.S.
- Died: March 27, 2016 (aged 63)
- Party: Democratic
- Spouse: Vicki Hertel
- Children: Curtis, Matthew, Lisa, Kevin
- Relatives: Dennis Hertel (brother); John Hertel (brother)
- Education: Wayne State University

Curtis Hertel Sr. (March 7, 1953 – March 27, 2016) was an American politician. He was the co-speaker of the Michigan House of Representatives from 1993–1994, during the time when the house was split evenly between Republicans and Democrats. He was a Democrat. He shared the speakership with Republican Paul Hillegonds.

Hertel held a bachelor's degree from Wayne State University.

Hertel was first elected to the State House of Representatives in 1980. His predecessor as speaker of the Michigan House, Lew Dodak, was voted out of office in the 1992 election.

In all Hertel served in the Michigan House of Representatives from 1980 until 1998.

Curtis Hertel's son, Curtis Hertel Jr., was elected to the Michigan State Senate in 2014, serving from 2015 to 2022. His youngest son, Kevin Hertel was elected to the Michigan House of Representatives in 2016. Hertel died on March 27, 2016.
