= Dennis Hertel =

American politician (born 1948)

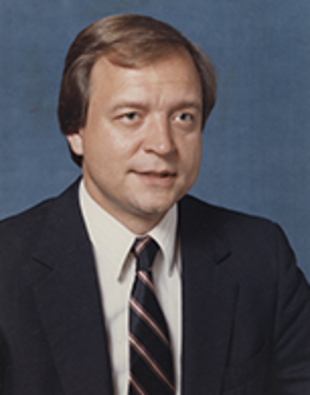

Member of the U.S. House of Representatives from Michigan's 14th district
- In office January 3, 1981 – January 3, 1993
- Preceded by: Lucien Nedzi
- Succeeded by: John Conyers

Member of the Michigan House of Representatives from the 12th district
- In office January 8, 1975 – January 14, 1981
- Preceded by: William B. Fitzgerald Jr.
- Succeeded by: Curtis Hertel

Personal details
- Born: Dennis Mark Hertel; December 7, 1948 (age 77) Detroit, Michigan, U.S.
- Party: Democratic
- Relatives: Curtis Hertel (brother); John Hertel (brother); Curtis Hertel Jr. (nephew); Kevin Hertel (nephew)
- Education: Eastern Michigan University (BA); Wayne State University (JD)

Dennis Mark Hertel (born December 7, 1948) is an American politician and lawyer from Michigan. From 1981 to 1993, he served six terms in the U.S. House of Representatives.

== Early life and education ==
Hertel was born in Detroit, Michigan, where he attended the public schools, graduating from Denby High School in 1967. He received a B.A. from Eastern Michigan University in 1971 and a J.D. from Wayne State University in 1974. He was admitted to the Michigan bar in 1975 and commenced practice in Detroit.

== Political career ==
He served in the Michigan House of Representatives, 1975–1980, representing the 12th district.

=== Congress ===
Hertel was elected as a Democrat from Michigan's 14th congressional district to the 97th United States Congress and to the five succeeding Congresses, serving from January 3, 1981 to January 3, 1993. He was not a candidate for renomination in 1992, primarily because his old district was split into four other districts which all had Democratic incumbents.

== Post-political career ==
Since leaving the Congress he has practiced law with the firm of Johnson, Rosati, Galica, Labarge, Aseltyne, Sugameli & Field, P.C. Hertel is now a Senior Counselor with The Livingston Group in Washington, D.C.

After leaving office, he became involved in political reform efforts, including joining nine other former members of Congress to co-author a 2021 opinion editorial advocating reforms of Congress. He is also a member of the ReFormers Caucus of Issue One.

== Personal life ==
He is a resident of Harper Woods, Michigan.

U.S. House of Representatives
Preceded by Lucien Nedzi	Member of the U.S. House of Representatives from Michigan's 14th congressional district 1981–1993	Succeeded by John Conyers
U.S. order of precedence (ceremonial)
Preceded by Mike Ross as Former U.S. Representative	Order of precedence of the United States as Former U.S. Representative	Succeeded by Nick Smith as Former U.S. Representative
