= John C. Hertel =

American politician (born 1946)

The Honorable John C. Hertel
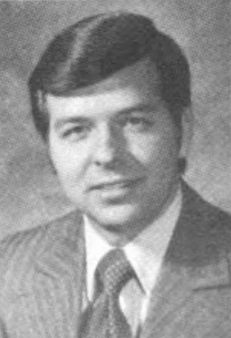

Member of the Huron-Clinton Metroparks Authority Board of Commissioners
- In office 1983 – May 2, 2017
- Succeeded by: Kurt Heise

Member of the Michigan Senate from the 2nd district
- In office March 1974 – December 31, 1982
- Preceded by: Charles N. Youngblood, Jr.
- Succeeded by: Basil W. Brown

Member of the Macomb County Board of Commissioners from the 14th district
- In office January 1, 1989 – December 31, 2002
- Preceded by: Walter Franchuk
- Succeeded by: Kurt S. Kramer

Member of the Wayne County Commission from the 1st district
- In office January 1, 1983 – December 31, 1986
- Succeeded by: David P. Cavanagh

Personal details
- Born: John Charles Hertel; December 4, 1946 (age 79) Detroit, Michigan
- Party: Democratic
- Relatives: Curtis Hertel (brother); Dennis Hertel (brother); Curtis Hertel Jr. (nephew); Kevin Hertel (nephew)
- Education: Wayne State University

John Charles Hertel (born December 4, 1946) is a former chairman of the Huron–Clinton Metroparks, chairman of the Detroit Metro Convention & Visitors Bureau, and general manager of Suburban Mobility Authority for Regional Transportation. He served three terms as state senator for the 2nd District in Michigan from 1974 to 1982, was appointed by Governor John Engler to run the Michigan State Fair from 1993 to 2006, and is the only person in Michigan history to serve as chairman of the county boards of commissioners in two different counties (Wayne and Macomb).

== Personal life ==
Hertel grew up in Detroit, Michigan, and attended Denby High School. His brothers Dennis Hertel and Curtis Hertel, and nephews Curtis Hertel Jr. and Kevin Hertel have also been elected to legislative seats. He raised his family in Harper Woods, Michigan, where he served in the state senate and Wayne County Board of Commissioners, before moving to his current home in Lenox Township, Michigan, where he served as Macomb County Commissioner. Hertel raises Percheron horses on his farm in Lenox Township.

== Elected office ==
Hertel has held three elected offices during his career:

- Macomb County Board of Commissioners (chairman from 1997 to 2002)
- Wayne County Board of Commissioners (chairman from 1985 to 1986)
- Michigan State Senator, 2nd District (1974–1982 - Three Terms)

== Huron-Clinton Metroparks ==
Hertel was appointed as a Huron-Clinton Metroparks Commissioner five times:

- 2013 by Governor Rick Snyder
- 2005 and 2009 by Governor Jennifer Granholm
- 1999 by Macomb County
- 1995 by Governor John Engler
- 1983 by Wayne County

== Michigan State Fair ==
Hertel was appointed General Manager of the Michigan State Fair by Governor John Engler (R) and reappointed by Governor Jennifer Granholm (D) from 1993 to 2006. He inherited the fair after its lowest attendance in decades, and was credited by many including Governor Granholm for, "directing the rebirth of the State Fair."

== Southeast Michigan Transit ==
Hertel was CEO of the Regional Transit Coordinating Council (RTCC) from 2006 to 2010, where he successfully developed and shepherded the Regional Mass Transit Plan to gain approval of Macomb, Oakland, Wayne counties and the City of Detroit. In 2010, Hertel was hired as General Manager of the Suburban Mobility Authority for Regional Transportation (SMART).

== Other notable positions ==
- Professor of Government, Environment and Technology at Lawrence Technological University, 1983–1995.
- Public Affairs Producer and Editorial Director of Channel 7 WXYZ-TV, 1987–1988.
