= Kevin Hertel =

American politician (born 1985)

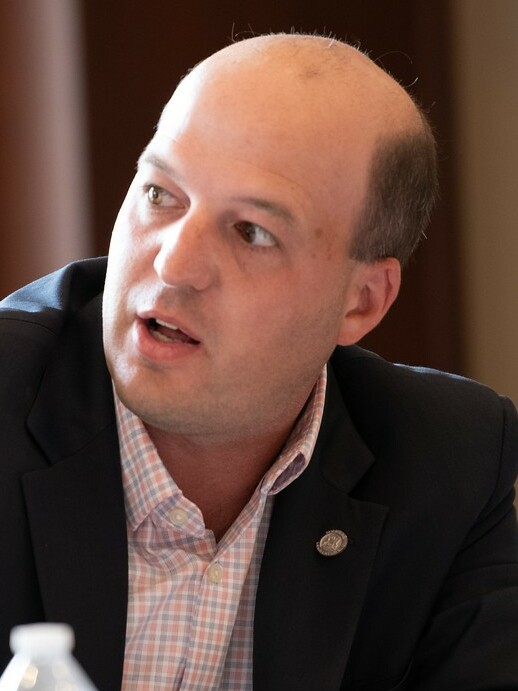

Member of the Michigan Senate from the 12th district
- Incumbent
- Assumed office January 1, 2023
- Preceded by: Rosemary Bayer

Member of the Michigan House of Representatives from the 18th district
- In office January 1, 2017 – January 1, 2023
- Preceded by: Sarah Roberts
- Succeeded by: Jason Hoskins

Personal details
- Party: Democratic
- Spouse: Ann
- Relatives: Curtis Hertel (father); Curtis Hertel Jr. (brother); Dennis Hertel (uncle); John Hertel (uncle)
- Education: Michigan State University (BA)

Kevin Hertel (born May 1985) is an American Democratic politician who has represented Michigan's 12th Senate district since January 2023. Prior to being elected to the Michigan Senate, Hertel represented the 18th district in the Michigan House of Representatives from 2017 to 2022.

== Education ==
Hertel attended Michigan State University, where he studied political science. He was active in an effort among Michigan public university students to advocate for increased higher education funding. He interned for State Senator Deb Cherry.

== Career ==
Before serving in the House, Hertel worked for Blue Cross Blue Shield of Michigan as a legislative analyst and then as a special assistant in the office of the president. He is the son of former House Speaker Curtis Hertel, and the brother of State Senator Curtis Hertel Jr.
