= Michigan's 24th House of Representatives district =

American legislative district

Michigan's 24th State House of Representatives district
Representative
Ranjeev Puri; D–Canton Township
- Demographics: 61.4% White; 9% Black; 4.1% Hispanic; 21.3% Asian; 0.1% Native American; 0.1% Other; 4% Multiracial
- Population (2024): 92,877

Michigan's 24th House of Representatives district is a legislative district within the Michigan House of Representatives located in Wayne County. The district was created in 1965, when the Michigan Supreme Court ordered the reapportionment of state legislative districts from a county-based system to a proportional one following the Supreme Court case Reynolds v. Sims. It is currently represented by Democrat Ranjeev Puri of Canton Township.

== List of representatives ==
Representative	Party	Years	Residence	Notes
James Del Rio	Democratic	1965–1972	Detroit	
Clifford H. Smart	Republican	1973–1974	Walled Lake	Redistricted from the 60th district.
Richard D. Fessler	Republican	1975–1982	Union Lake (until around 1980); West Bloomfield Township	
Robert D. McGee	Republican	1983–1984	Union Lake	
David M. Honigman	Republican	1985–1990	West Bloomfield Township	
Barbara Jeane Dobb	Republican	1991–1992	Union Lake	Redistricted to the 39th district.
Joseph Palamara	Democratic	1993–1998	Wyandotte	Redistricted from the 30th district; term limited.
William J. O'Neil	Democratic	1999–2002	Allen Park	Redistricted to the 14th district.
Jack Brandenburg	Republican	2003–2008	Harrison Township	Term limited.
Sarah B. Roberts	Democratic	2009–2010	St. Clair Shores	
Anthony Forlini	Republican	2011–2016	Harrison Township	Term limited.
Steve Marino	Republican	2017–2022	Harrison Township	Term limited.
Ranjeev Puri	Democratic	2023–present	Canton Township	Redistricted from the 21st district.

== Historical district boundaries ==
Map	Description	Apportionment Plan	Notes
	Wayne County (part): Detroit (part)	1964 Apportionment Plan (Note: Referred to as the Austin-Kleiner plan.)	
	Oakland County (part): Commerce Township; Lyon Township; Keego Harbor; Milford Township; Northville (part); Novi; Novi Township; Orchard Lake Village; South Lyon; Walled Lake; West Bloomfield Township (part); White Lake Township; Wixom	1972 Apportionment Plan (Note: Referred to as the Hatcher-Kleiner plan.)	
	Oakland County (part): Commerce Township; Orchard Lake Village; Walled Lake; West Bloomfield Township; Wixom	1982 Apportionment Plan	
	Wayne County (part): Allen Park (part); Riverview; Southgate; Wyandotte	1992 Apportionment Plan	
	Macomb County (part): Harrison Township; Lake Township; St. Clair Shores	2001 Apportionment Plan	
	Macomb County (part): Clinton Township (part); Harrison Township; Macomb Township (part)	2011 Apportionment Plan	
	Wayne County (part): Canton Township (part)	2021 Apportionment Plan (Note: Referred to as the Hickory plan.)	

== Recent elections ==
=== 2020s ===
2026 Michigan House of Representatives election
Party	Candidate	Votes	%
Democratic	Ranjeev Puri (incumbent)	31,029	66.18
Republican	Allison Kay Fuller	15,857	33.82
Total votes		46,886	100
Democratic hold			

2024 Michigan House of Representatives election
Party	Candidate	Votes	%
Democratic	Ranjeev Puri (incumbent)	30,675	59.82
Republican	Leonard C. Scott	20,602	40.18
Total votes		51,277	100
Democratic hold			

2022 Michigan House of Representatives election
Party	Candidate	Votes	%
Democratic	Ranjeev Puri	24,866	60.9
Republican	John Anthony	15,968	39.1
Total votes		40,834	100
Democratic gain from Republican			

2020 Michigan House of Representatives election
Party	Candidate	Votes	%
Republican	Steve Marino (incumbent)	29,394	57.54
Democratic	Michelle Woodman	21,692	42.46
Total votes		51,086	100
Republican hold			

=== 2010s ===
2018 Michigan House of Representatives election
Party	Candidate	Votes	%
Republican	Steve Marino (incumbent)	21,391	55.54
Democratic	Laura Winn	17,125	44.46
Total votes		38,516	100
Republican hold			

2016 Michigan House of Representatives election
Party	Candidate	Votes	%
Republican	Steve Marino	23,968	55.07
Democratic	Dana Camphous-Peterson	19,553	44.93
Total votes		43,521	100
Republican hold			

2014 Michigan House of Representatives election
Party	Candidate	Votes	%
Republican	Anthony G. Forlini (incumbent)	16,358	58.54
Democratic	Philip Kurczewski	10,893	38.99
U.S. Taxpayers'	Daryl L. Smith	690	2.47
Total votes		27,941	100
Republican hold			

2012 Michigan House of Representatives election
Party	Candidate	Votes	%
Republican	Anthony G. Forlini (incumbent)	22,360	54.71
Democratic	Philip Kurczewski	18,508	45.29
Total votes		40,868	100
Republican hold			

2010 Michigan House of Representatives election
Party	Candidate	Votes	%
Republican	Anthony G. Forlini	16,552	50.18
Democratic	Sarah Roberts (incumbent)	15,516	47.04
Libertarian	Keith P. Edwards	919	2.79
Total votes		32,987	100
Republican gain from Democratic			

=== 2000s ===
2008 Michigan House of Representatives election
Party	Candidate	Votes	%
Democratic	Sarah Roberts	23,495	49.36
Republican	Bryan Brandenburg	22,430	47.12
Green	Jody Beaubien	1,678	3.52
Total votes		47,603	100
Democratic gain from Republican			

2006 Michigan House of Representatives election
Party	Candidate	Votes	%
Republican	Jack Brandenburg (incumbent)	22,256	59.34
Democratic	Karen A. Abella	14,645	39.04
U.S. Taxpayers'	Frederick W. Powell	608	1.62
Total votes		37,509	100
Republican hold			

2004 Michigan House of Representatives election
Party	Candidate	Votes	%
Republican	Jack Brandenburg (incumbent)	29,111	62.7
Democratic	Dan Foukes	17,317	37.3
Total votes		46,428	100
Republican hold			

2002 Michigan House of Representatives election
Party	Candidate	Votes	%
Republican	Jack Brandenburg	17,697	53.56
Democratic	Frank P. Benson	14,296	43.27
Libertarian	Erin Stahl	1,049	3.17
Total votes		33,042	100
Republican gain from Democratic			

2000 Michigan House of Representatives election
Party	Candidate	Votes	%
Democratic	William J. O'Neil (incumbent)	22,466	70.98
Republican	Joseph M. Lenard	8,594	27.15
Libertarian	Eric B. Gordon	593	1.87
Total votes		31,653	100
Democratic hold			

=== 1990s ===
1998 Michigan House of Representatives election
Party	Candidate	Votes	%
Democratic	William J. O'Neil	16,119	67.02
Republican	Madeline D. Martin	7,454	30.99
Libertarian	Kathie Orvis	479	1.99
Total votes		24,052	100
Democratic hold			
