= Anthony Forlini =

American politician

Tony Forlini

Macomb County Clerk/Register of Deeds
- Incumbent
- Assumed office January 1, 2021
- Preceded by: Fred Miller

Member of the Michigan House of Representatives from the 24th district
- In office January 1, 2011 – December 2016
- Preceded by: Sarah Roberts
- Succeeded by: Steve Marino

Personal details
- Born: February 4, 1962 (age 64) Detroit, Michigan, U.S.
- Party: Republican
- Spouse: Diane Forlini
- Children: 3
- Education: Western Michigan University (BA)

Anthony G. Forlini (born February 4, 1962) is an American businessman and politician serving as the county clerk of Macomb County, Michigan since 2021. A member of the Republican Party, Forlini previously served as a member of the Michigan House of Representatives from 2011 through 2016, and as the supervisor of Harrison Township, Michigan from 2004 to 2011. He was the Republican nominee for the 2026 Michigan Secretary of State election, losing to Democratic nominee Garlin Gilchrist.

== Early life ==
On February 4, 1962, Forlini was born in Detroit, Michigan. Forlini's father was an Italian from the town of Cassino, Italy. Forlini grew up in St. Clair Shores. Forlini attended St. Germaine Elementary School.

== Education ==
In 1984, Forlini earned a degree in Business from Western Michigan University. Forlini is a Certified Financial Planner.

== Career ==
As a businessman, Forlini is the owner of Design Financial Inc.

In 2004, Forlini became a township supervisor in Harrison Township, Michigan, until 2011.

On November 2, 2010, Forlini won the election and became a Republican member of Michigan House of Representatives for District 24. Forlini defeated Sarah Roberts and Keith P. Edwards with 50.18% of the votes. On November 6, 2012, as an incumbent, Forlini won the election and continued serving District 24. Forlini defeated Philip Kurczewski with 54.71% of the votes. District 24 covers Harrison Township as well as portions of Clinton Township and Macomb Township.

In 2016, Forlini announced that he was running for Congress in Michigan's 10th District as Candice Miller, the then current Representative, was not running for another term. He later came in fourth in the primary, getting 10% of the vote.

In 2017, Forlini became an Operations Manager with Macomb County Public Works.

Since 2021, he has served as the Macomb County clerk.

On September 24, 2025, Forlini entered the 2026 Michigan Secretary of State election, seeking the Republican nomination. He later lost the election in November to Democratic nominee Garlin Gilchrist.

== Awards ==
- 2016 Knighted. Order of the Star of Italy. Presented by Maria Luisa Lapresa, the Consul of Italy in Detroit, Michigan.

== Personal life ==
Forlini's wife is Diane Forlini. They have three children and four grandchildren. Forlini's family currently live in Harrison Township, Michigan. Forlini is a Roman Catholic.

Party political offices
Preceded by Kristina Karamo	Republican nominee for Secretary of State of Michigan; 2026	Most recent
