= 2026 Michigan Secretary of State election =

- November 3, 2026

Nominee	Garlin Gilchrist	Anthony Forlini
Party	Democratic	Republican
Popular vote	2,551,527	2,064,462
Percentage	53.79%	43.53%
- Gilchrist: 40–50% 50–60% 60–70% 70–80% Forlini: 40–50% 50–60% 60–70% 70–80%
Secretary of State before election
Jocelyn Benson
Democratic
Elected Secretary of State
Garlin Gilchrist
Democratic

The 2026 Michigan Secretary of State election took place on November 3, 2026, to elect the secretary of state of Michigan. Incumbent Democratic secretary of state Jocelyn Benson was term-limited and ineligible to seek a third term, and she instead ran successfully for governor of Michigan. The major-party nominees were decided at state party conventions in August 2026. Democratic lieutenant governor Garlin Gilchrist and Republican Macomb County clerk Anthony Forlini were the nominees for their respective parties, with Gilchrist winning the general election.

== Democratic convention ==
=== Candidates ===
==== Nominee ====
- Garlin Gilchrist, lieutenant governor of Michigan (2019–present) (previously ran for governor)

==== Eliminated at convention ====
- Suzanna Shkreli, former Michigan Lottery commissioner (2024–2025) and nominee for Michigan's 8th congressional district in 2016

==== Withdrawn ====
- Barbara Byrum, Ingham County clerk (2013–present) and former state representative from the 67th district (2007–2012)
- Aghogho Edevbie, deputy secretary of state (2023–present) (endorsed Gilchrist)
- Adam Hollier, former state senator from the 2nd district (2018–2022) and candidate for Michigan's 13th congressional district in 2022 and 2024 (ran for state senate)

==== Declined ====
- Jeremy Moss, president pro tempore of the Michigan Senate (2023–present) from the 7th district (2019–present) (ran for U.S. House)

=== Endorsements ===
Garlin Gilchrist

U.S. representatives

- Rashida Tlaib, MI-12 (2019–present)

State legislators

- Brenda Carter, HD-53 (2019–present)
- Kimberly Edwards, HD-12 (2023–present)
- Morgan Foreman, HD-33 (2025–present)
- Donavan McKinney, HD-11 (2023–present)

Local officials

- Abdullah Hammoud, mayor of Dearborn (2022–present)

Party chapters

- 12th Congressional District Democratic Party
- 13th Congressional District Democratic Party

Labor unions

- American Federation of Teachers Michigan
- Laborers' International Union of North America Michigan
- Michigan AFL-CIO
- Michigan Education Association
- Michigan Nurses Association
- Northwest Midwest Regional Council of Carpenters
- UNITE HERE Local 24
- United Auto Workers

Organizations

- End Citizens United (previously endorsed Edevbie)
- Equality Michigan
- Reproductive Freedom for All
- Wayne State College Democrats

Political parties

- Michigan Democratic Party

Newspapers

- Michigan Chronicle
Barbara Byrum (withdrawn)

U.S. representatives

- James Barcia, former MI-5 (1993–2003) and Bay County Executive (2017–present)
- Mark Schauer, former MI-7 (2009–2011) and nominee for governor in 2014
- Joe Schwarz, former MI-7 (2005–2007) (Independent; elected as a Republican) (Deceased)

State legislators

- Dianne Byrum, former minority leader of the Michigan House of Representatives from HD-67 (2003–2006) (candidate's mother)
- Kara Hope, HD-74 (2019–present)
- Jeff Irwin, SD-15 (2019–present)
- Tullio Liberati Jr., HD-2 (2021–present)
- Laurie Pohutsky, HD-17 (2019–present)
- Will Snyder, HD-87 (2023–present)
- Penelope Tsernoglou, HD-75 (2023–present)
- 12 other former state representatives

Local officials

- Richard LeBlanc, Westland city clerk (2016–present)
- Mary Waters, at-large Detroit city councilor (2022–present)
- 12 county clerks

Party officials

- Lavora Barnes, former chair of the Michigan Democratic Party (2019–2025)
- Mark Brewer, former chair of the Michigan Democratic Party (1995–2013)
- Lon Johnson, former chair of the Michigan Democratic Party (2013–2015)

Labor unions

- International Brotherhood of Electrical Workers Michigan
- United Association Locals 85, 333, 370, 636, and 671
- United Food and Commercial Workers Local 951
Aghogho Edevbie (withdrawn)

State legislators

- Jimmie Wilson Jr., HD-32 (2023–present)
- Stephanie Young, HD-16 (2021–present)

Labor unions

- International Brotherhood of Teamsters Locals 243, 247, 406, and 1038

Organizations

- ~~End Citizens United~~ (endorsed Gilchrist after withdrawal)
Adam Hollier (withdrawn)

State legislators

- Peter Herzberg, HD-25 (2024–present)
- Joe Tate, former speaker of the Michigan House of Representatives (2023–2025) from HD-9 (2019–present)

Local officials

- David Coulter, Oakland County Executive (2019–present)
Declined to endorse

Statewide officials

- Gretchen Whitmer, governor of Michigan (2019–present)

=== Fundraising ===
Italics indicate a withdrawn candidate.

Campaign finance reports as of August 13, 2026
Candidate	Raised	Spent	Cash on hand
Barbara Byrum (D)	$338,912	$338,912	$0
Aghogho Edevbie (D)	$331,662	$330,507	$1,155
Garlin Gilchrist (D)	$1,763,060	$727,600	$1,035,459
Adam Hollier (D)	$458,741 (Note: $244,000 of this total was transferred from Hollier's congressional campaign account)	$458,741	$0
Suzanna Shkreli (D)	$302,498	$225	$302,273
Source: Michigan Secretary of State

== Republican convention ==
=== Candidates ===
==== Nominee ====
- Anthony Forlini, Macomb County clerk (2020–present)

==== Eliminated at convention ====
- Amanda Love, Clarkston Community Schools trustee
- Monica Yatooma, strategic partnerships director
- Timothy Smith

==== Withdrawn ====
- Articia Bomer (endorsed Forlini)

=== Endorsements ===
Anthony Forlini

Statewide officials

- Candice Miller, Macomb County Public Works Commissioner (2017–present), former Michigan Secretary of State (1995–2003), and former U.S. representative for Michigan's 10th congressional district (2003–2016)

State legislators

- Bruce Rendon, HD-103 (2011–2016)

Organizations

- Michigan Fraternal Order of Police

Political parties

- Michigan Republican Party

=== Fundraising ===
Campaign finance reports as of August 6, 2026
Candidate	Raised	Spent	Cash on hand
Anthony Forlini (R)	$494,975	$198,372	$296,603
Amanda Love (R)	$138,606 (Note: $53,811 of this total has been self-funded by Love)	$138,606	$0
Timothy Smith (R)	$23.70	$0	$23.70
Monica Yatooma (R)	$151,455	$76,781	$74,674
Source: Michigan Secretary of State

== Third-party candidates ==
=== Libertarian Party ===
==== Nominee ====
- Christine Sloan

=== Green Party ===
==== Nominee ====
- Eric Borregard, visual artist

=== U.S. Taxpayers Party ===
==== Nominee ====
- Scott E. Aughney

== General election ==
=== Predictions ===
Source	Ranking	As of
Sabato's Crystal Ball	Lean D	October 29, 2026

=== Post-convention endorsements ===
Anthony Forlini (R)

Newspapers

- The Detroit News
Garlin Gilchrist (D)

Organizations

- Detroit Regional Chamber PAC
- Everytown for Gun Safety

Newspapers

- Detroit Free Press

=== Debates ===
2026 Michigan Secretary of State election debates and forums
No.	Date	Host	Moderator	Link	Democratic	Republican	Libertarian	U.S. Taxpayers	Green
Key: P Participant A Absent N Not invited I Invited W Withdrawn									
Key: P Participant A Absent N Not invited I Invited W Withdrawn					Gilchrist	Forlini	Sloan	Aughney	Borregard
1	September 29, 2026	League of Women Voters of Michigan	Judy Florian	YouTube	P	P	P	P	P
2	October 8, 2026	UM Ford School of Public Policy	Jordyn Hermani; Zach Gorchow	YouTube	P	P	N	N	N

=== Fundraising ===
Campaign finance reports as of October 18, 2026
Candidate	Raised	Spent	Cash on hand
Anthony Forlini (R)	$810,658	$752,685	$57,972
Garlin Gilchrist (D)	$3,051,579	$2,301,078	$750,500
Source: Michigan Secretary of State

=== Polling ===
Poll source	Date(s) administered	Sample size (Note: Key: A – all adults RV – registered voters LV – likely voters V – unclear)	Margin of error	Garlin Gilchrist (D)	Anthony Forlini (R)	Undecided
Glengariff Group	October 19–22, 2026	600 (LV)	± 4.0%	51%	39%	10%
Cygnal (R)/Beacon Research (D) (Note: Poll sponsored by Michigan Enjoyer)	September 18–21, 2026	600 (LV)	± 4.0%	41%	38%	20%
Glengariff Group (Note: Poll sponsored by The Detroit News and WDIV-TV)	August 31 – September 3, 2026	600 (LV)	± 4.0%	42%	36%	22%

=== Results ===
2026 Michigan Secretary of State election
Party	Candidate	Votes	%	±%
Democratic	Garlin Gilchrist	2,551,527	53.79	
Republican	Anthony Forlini	2,064,462	43.53	
Libertarian	Christine Sloan	77,431	1.63	
U.S. Taxpayers	Scott E. Aughney	28,278	0.60	
Green	Eric Borregard	21,544	0.45	
Total votes		4,743,242	100.0	
Democratic hold				

== See also ==
- 2026 United States secretary of state elections
- 2026 Michigan elections

== Notes ==
Partisan clients
