= Medical amnesty policy =

Type of law

Medical amnesty policies are laws or acts enacted protecting from liability those who seek medical attention as a result of illegal actions. Such policies have been developing most notably in colleges in the United States regarding alcohol use by students. Schools such as Cornell University have implemented such policies to protect students seeking medical attention from illegal action for underage drinking and possession of alcohol and/or other drugs. The purpose of such policies is to reduce the hesitation caused by fear of legal action to seek medical attention. Similar policies are applicable at many levels: colleges and universities, local communities, as well as state governments. In 2012, The Medical Amnesty Initiative was started with the specific purpose of advocating for the introduction, passage, and education of medical amnesty legislation throughout the United States.

== Development ==
Medical amnesty policies were first present in the university setting. Although failure to seek medical assistance in cases of alcohol poisoning can lead to fatal outcomes, evidence suggests that the threat of judicial consequences resulting from enforcement of the minimum drinking age or other law or policy violations leads some students to refrain from calling for emergency medical services. A study was initiated in 2002 at Cornell University to investigate if implementation of a Medical amnesty policy increase the likelihood that students will call for help in alcohol-related medical emergencies; and increase the likelihood that students treated for alcohol-related medical emergencies will receive a brief psycho-educational intervention at the university health center as a follow-up to their medical treatment.

In April 2009, more than 100 college and university presidents signed the Amethyst Initiative. The Amethyst Initiative seeks to spark discussion about the current drinking age, problems related to underage drinking, and to develop new ideas about the best ways to prepare young adults to make responsible decisions about alcohol. One preventative component of this that many campuses have adopted is requiring an online alcohol education course before registering for classes. Another option to better handle underage drinking is the introduction of medical amnesty policies.

== Levels of protection ==
Medical amnesty policies can extend legal protection to varying degrees.

=== Individual amnesty ===
Individual amnesty is the most limited level of protection. This level protects individuals who are seeking medical attention for themselves as a result of an illegal action. Individual amnesty does not extend to organizations that person may be a part of or peers also present with the individual at that time.

=== Victim Amnesty ===
Amnesty for victims offers more protection than individual amnesty, as it protects individuals requiring medical attention regardless of whether it was the victim or another party who sought help. Victim amnesty does not address the sanctions possible for violating parties besides the victim.

=== Caller amnesty ===
These policies, also known as Good Samaritan policies, protects individuals who call for another person seeking medical attention as a result of an illegal action. Liability protection in medical amnesty policies can often extend to those seeking help regardless if they are the one who is given medical assistance. This policy builds on individual amnesty but does not guarantee protection from legal prosecution for an organization the persons are a part of or attending. See also Good Samaritan law.

=== Organizational amnesty ===
Protects an organization that is related to the event at which medical attention is sought as a result of an illegal action. Organizational amnesty would extend liability protection to fraternities, sororities, clubs and other social venues that may have people at their location who are under the influence of certain intoxicants. This level of amnesty allows for the largest level of protection and is subsequently the most controversial as well. Various institutions provide medical amnesty to individuals and callers but do not extend amnesty to organizations that may be involved.

== Levels of implementation ==
=== Colleges and Universities ===
Many colleges and universities hold some level of a medical amnesty policy. Medical amnesty at the university level most often pertains to exemption from punishment for an intoxicated or impaired underage student if medical assistance is called to help him or her in an emergency situation. Instead of a harsher penalty for underage drinking or drug use, a student usually receives some sort of counseling by a professional following an incident to help identify if the student has a more serious alcohol or drug problem and to provide the student with suggestions on how to stay safe in the future.

Ultimately universities seek to encourage students to call for help, valuing the student's well-being as the primary concern and forgoing punishment for the student's mistake, instead referring students involved to education, community service, and rehabilitation services. Richmond University compiled a list in February 2010 of colleges and universities that have a medical amnesty policy in place as of that time. The organization, Students for Sensible Drug Policy, is an extremely strong advocate for expanding medical amnesty policies on college campuses. The organization provides a list of schools who currently have a medical amnesty policy and a description of what the policy includes as well as a brief description of the school.

=== States ===
The specifics of Medical Amnesty Acts, or sometimes titled 911 Good Samaritan or 911 Lifeline, vary from state to state. The laws are also in varying stages of development and implementation. The following states have passed a Medical Amnesty law: Alabama, Arkansas, Arizona, California, Colorado, Delaware, Florida, Georgia, Hawaii, Illinois, Indiana, Kansas, Kentucky, Louisiana, Maine, Maryland, Michigan, Minnesota, Montana, Nebraska, Nevada, North Carolina, North Dakota, New Jersey, New Mexico, New York, Oklahoma, Oregon, Pennsylvania, Texas, Utah, Vermont, Virginia, Washington, West Virginia. Washington, D.C. also provides Medical Amnesty protection. Several states also have a Medical Amnesty bill moving through the legislative process.

Michigan’s Medical Amnesty Legislation, House Bill 4393, was signed into law by Governor Rick Snyder on 8 May 2012, and took effect on 1 June 2012. The bill was sponsored by Representative Anthony G. Forlini at the request of Steve Marino, Aaron Letzeiser, and the Associated Students of Michigan State University.

On 4 January 2017 the superseding Michigan House Bill 5649 of 2016 was signed into law by Governor Snyder and became effective as Public Act 307 of 2016. This superseding act expands Michigan's medical amnesty protection to any person, regardless of age, who requests medical assistance for someone who is suffering the effects of a drug or alcohol emergency, as well as anyone else who is with them. The person suffering from the medical emergency is also protected. The protection from prosecution only covers violations of Michigan's controlled substance and alcohol laws. They still may be prosecuted for non-drug or alcohol related offenses that may be discovered in the course of providing medical assistance.

Indiana's medical amnesty legislation, called the Lifeline Law, was signed into law by Governor Mitch Daniels on 16 March 2024 and took effect 1 June 2012. The bill was sponsored by Senator Jim Merrit at the request of a coalition of students from across the state of Indiana led by Purdue students Brett Highley and David Rosenthal.

=== Federal ===
No federal legislation has been introduced to date concerning medical amnesty.

== The Medical Amnesty Initiative ==
Following the successful passage of Michigan's Medical Amnesty law, advocate Aaron Letzeiser created The Medical Amnesty Initiative; a non-profit organization dedicated to the introduction, passage, and education of Medical Amnesty legislation throughout the United States.

== Effectiveness ==
Cornell University completed one of the most extensive studies on Medical Amnesty Policies to date. The study found that within two years of implementing a Medical Amnesty (MAP)/Good Samaritan Policy, “students were less likely to report fear of getting an intoxicated person in trouble as a barrier to calling for help. Furthermore, the percentage of students seen by health centre staff for a brief psycho-educational intervention after an alcohol-related emergency more than doubled (from 22% to 52%) by the end of the second year.”

“This finding, combined with the survey data indicating a slight decrease in students’ barriers to calling for help, suggests that the increase in calls for help in an alcohol-related emergency was a function of the MAP and related educational efforts rather than changes in drinking practices.”

“While well-intended, policies and practices at institutions of higher education that are designed to enforce minimum legal drinking age laws and restrict other aspects of alcohol possession and consumption may have negative consequences. For example, such policies may actually deter some students from calling for emergency medical services in dangerous circumstances caused by heavy alcohol use (Colby, Raymond, & Colby, 2000). When alcohol is present, students may be reluctant to seek help in these emergencies because of potential judicial consequences for themselves, the person in need of assistance, or the hosting organization (Meilman, 1992). Often the decision whether to call for help happens late at night and becomes the responsibility of student bystanders whose judgment may be impaired because of their own alcohol consumption.”

“Research suggests that when individuals who are treated for alcohol-related emergencies receive, as part of their follow-up care after the emergency, a brief psycho-educational intervention examining their alcohol use, the likelihood of recurrence is reduced (Longabaughet al., 2001). At Cornell, students are unlikely to avail themselves of such services on a voluntary basis, even when they receive written requests to do so from the director of health services. In contrast, students who are required to participate in such education as a result of judicial action do so consistently. Since September 2001, the standard requirement for students with a first-time judicial violation has been participation in the Cornell BASICS (Brief Alcohol and Screening Intervention for College Students) program. The Cornell BASICS program was modeled on research that found a two-session screening and feedback process, with elements of motivational interviewing and cognitive-behavioral skills training, to be effective in reducing drinking and the harm associated with high-risk alcohol consumption in the college environment (Baer, Kivlahan, Blume, McKnight, & Marlatt, 2001; Barnett et al., 2004; Borsari & Carey, 2000; Dimeff, Baer, Kivlahan, & Marlatt, 1999; Marlatt et al., 1998).”

"A random sample survey of Cornell undergraduates conducted in the spring of 2000 found that 19% of respondents reported thinking about calling for help because they were concerned about someone who was severely intoxicated, though only 4% actually called for help. The most frequently cited reason for not calling for help was that the respondent was not sure if the person was sick enough (9.3%). The next highest reason given was because the respondent did not want to get the distressed individual in trouble (3.8%).”

== Criticisms ==
Many people have criticized medical amnesty policies as policies that perpetuate underage drinking. Critics note that the goal of ameliorating the issue of youth alcohol consumption and drug abuse should focus more on preventing such activities rather than simply providing a more open course of action once choices have been made. An alternative explanation could be that the increase in calls for help reflects an increase in heavy drinking among the student population resulting in a larger percentage of students in need of emergency assistance.

== See also ==
- Good Samaritan Law
- Alcohol consumption by youth in the United States
- Controlled Substances Act
- Emergency medical services
- Amethyst Initiative
- Substance abuse
- Drug overdose
