= Sarah Roberts (politician) =

American politician from Michigan

Member of the Michigan House of Representatives from the 18th district
- In office January 1, 2013 – December 31, 2016
- Preceded by: Richard LeBlanc
- Succeeded by: Kevin Hertel

Member of the Michigan House of Representatives from the 24th district
- In office January 1, 2009 – December 31, 2010
- Preceded by: Jack Brandenburg
- Succeeded by: Anthony G. Forlini

Personal details
- Born: December 9, 1974 (age 51) St. Clair Shores, Michigan
- Party: Democratic
- Profession: Politician

Sarah Roberts (born December 9, 1974) is an American politician from the state of Michigan. Since 2009, she has served in the Michigan State House of Representatives. A Democrat, Roberts represents the 24th State House District, which is located in eastern Macomb County and includes the city of St. Clair Shores and Harrison Township, as well as the small portion of Grosse Pointe Shores that is located within Macomb County. Prior to being elected in 2008, Roberts represented Northern St. Clair Shores in the Macomb County Commission.

== Biography ==
Sarah Roberts was born on December 9, 1974, in Michigan to Helen and Charles Roberts. She graduated from the University of Iowa, receiving her bachelor's degree in 2000. She served as a community organizer for Clean Water Action of Macomb County from 2003 to 2005. She worked in the communications department of the House Democratic Caucus in the Michigan State House of Representatives from 2005 to 2006 before being elected to the Macomb County Board of Commissioners.

== Political career ==
In 2006, Roberts announced her candidacy for the Macomb County Commission. She ran for the 24th District, located in Northern St. Clair Shores. The 24th district, which leans Democratic, was being vacated by Democrat Peggy Kennard. Roberts defeated Republican Richard Doan by a large margin. She served on the commission for two years before being elected to the State House of Representatives.

In January 2008, Roberts filed to run as a Democrat for the 24th State House District, which was being vacated by Republican Jack Brandenburg, who was barred from running for re-election due to term limits. She faced seven other Democrats in the primary election, but still carried 63% of the vote. The 24th District is a narrow district that runs north-to-south along Lake St. Clair. It includes the city of St. Clair Shores, Harrison Township, and a small portion of Grosse Pointe Shores, and is normally a battleground district, although it historically favored Democrats (prior to Jack Brandenburg, the seat had been held by a Democrat going back to the 1970s). In the general election, Roberts faced Republican Bryan Brandenburg, an unsuccessful candidate for Macomb County Commission and son of then-current Representative Jack Brandenburg.

The race for the 24th District was one of the most competitive in Michigan. The state Democratic Party alone invested over $220,000 in the race, an unusually high number for a state house race. The race featured a large amount of negative campaigning, including adds that raised questions about four incidents involving Brandenburg in which the police investigated but no charges were filed, including an assault accusation at a party. On election day, Roberts emerged narrowly victorious by just over 1,000 votes, or about 2%. President Obama carried the 24th District by a similarly narrow 51.5%-46.4% margin.

Roberts took office on January 1, 2009. She sits on the Education, Energy and Technology, Great Lakes and Environment, and Military, Vet. Affairs, and Homeland Security Committees.

== Electoral history ==
- 2008 campaign for State House
  - Sarah Roberts (D), 49.4%
  - Bryan Brandenburg (R), 47.1%
- 2006 campaign for Macomb County Commission
  - Sarah Roberts (D), 59.2%
  - Richard A. Doan (R), 39.2%
