= Steve Marino (politician) =

American politician from Michigan

Member of the Michigan House of Representatives from the 24th district
- In office January 1, 2017 – January 1, 2023
- Preceded by: Anthony G. Forlini
- Succeeded by: Alicia St. Germaine

Macomb County Commissioner from the 10th district
- In office January 1, 2015 – December 31, 2016
- Preceded by: Michael A. Boyle
- Succeeded by: Robert Leonetti

Personal details
- Born: March 24, 1989 (age 37) Detroit, Michigan
- Party: Republican
- Education: Michigan State University (BA); Northwestern University (MPPA)
- Website: www.steve-marino.com

Steve Marino (born March 24, 1989, in Detroit, Michigan) is a former Republican member of the Michigan House of Representatives and the Macomb County Board of Commissioners.

== Personal life and education ==
Marino was born on March 24, 1989, in Detroit, Michigan. He spent much of his early life in nearby Harrison Township on Lake St. Clair.

Marino graduated from L’Anse Creuse High School, where he was honored with numerous academic and athletic accolades, including the Wendy's High School Heisman award.

After high school, he attended the Michigan State University, where he played lacrosse and graduated with degrees in economics, public policy and public administration, and political theory and constitutional democracy.

While student body president and chairman of the Associated Students of Michigan State University, Marino successfully advocated for the passage of Medical Amnesty legislation, which protected minors from legal consequences if they sought medical help during alcohol-related emergencies, through the Michigan Legislature in 2012.

In 2025, Marino graduated with a Master of Public Policy and Administration (M.P.P.A.) degree from Northwestern University.

== Election results ==
=== 2014 election ===
Marino decided to challenge long-time incumbent Macomb County Commissioner Michael A. Boyle for the 10th District of the 13-member Macomb County Board of Commissioners.

Marino ran unopposed in the Republican primary, as did incumbent Michael A. Boyle in the Democratic primary. In the November 4 election, Marino received 10,669 votes (50.9%), while his opponent, Boyle, received 10,275 votes (49.1%).

2014 Macomb County Commission – 10th District election
| Party | Candidate | Votes | % | ±% |
|---|---|---|---|---|
| Republican | Steve Marino | 10,669 | 50.9% | N/A |
| Democratic | Michael A. Boyle | 10,275 | 49.1% | N/A |
| Total votes | | 20,944 | 100.00% | N/A |
| Republican hold | | | | |

=== 2016 election ===
Anthony G. Forlini, the representative of District 24, did not seek-reelection because of term limit restrictions. Steve Marino, 27 at the time, secured more than 75% (4,991) of the 6,274 votes cast in the August 2 Republican primary election for the position, securing his nomination. His opponent, Dana Camphous-Peterson, ran unopposed in the Democratic primary. In the November 8 election, Marino received 23,968 votes (55.07%), while Camphous-Peterson received 19,553 votes (44.93%) and was elected to his first term.

2016 Michigan House of Representatives election
| Party | Candidate | Votes | % |
|---|---|---|---|
| Republican | Steve Marino | 23,968 | 55.07% |
| Democratic | Dana Camphous-Peterson | 19,553 | 44.93% |
| Total votes | | 43,521 | 100.00% |
| Republican hold | | | |

=== 2018 election ===
Marino ran for reelection unopposed in the Republican primary, as did Laura Winn in the Democratic primary. In the November 6 election, Marino received 21,391 votes (55.54%), while his opponent, Winn, received 17,125 votes (44.46%).

2018 Michigan House of Representatives election
| Party | Candidate | Votes | % |
|---|---|---|---|
| Republican | Steve Marino | 21,391 | 55.54 |
| Democratic | Laura Winn | 17,124 | 44.46 |
| Total votes | | 38,515 | |
| Republican hold | | | |

=== 2020 election ===
Steve Marino successfully ran for his third and final term, due to term limits, in 2020. 31 at the time, Marino secured more than 83% (9,861) of the 11,781 votes cast in the August 4 Republican primary election for the position, securing his nomination. In the November 8 election, Marino received 29,394 votes (57.54%), while Woodman received 21,692 votes (42.46%).

2020 Michigan House of Representatives election
| Party | Candidate | Votes | % |
|---|---|---|---|
| Republican | Steve Marino | 29,394 | 57.54 |
| Democratic | Michelle Woodman | 21,692 | 42.46 |
| Total votes | | 51,086 | 100 |
| Republican hold | | | |
