= Jack Brandenburg =

American politician (born 1951)

Member of the Michigan Senate
- In office January 1, 2011 – January 9, 2019
- Preceded by: Alan Sanborn
- Succeeded by: Peter Lucido
- Constituency: 11th district (2011–2014); 8th district (2015–2019)

Member of the Michigan House of Representatives from the 24th district
- In office January 1, 2003 – December 31, 2008
- Preceded by: William O'Neill
- Succeeded by: Sarah Roberts

Personal details
- Born: October 22, 1951 (age 74) Canton, Ohio, US
- Party: Republican

Jack Brandenburg (born October 22, 1951) is a retired Republican Michigan state senator. He was elected to office in 2010. Previously he had served for six years as a member of the Michigan House of Representatives and a member of that body's appropriations committee.

Brandenburg was born in Canton, Ohio. He has a bachelor's degree from Ashland University.

Brandenburg is a businessman who founded and owns Blue Water Industrial Supply, a company headquartered in Mount Clemens, Michigan. Brandenburg lives in Harrison Township, Michigan.

Prior to his election to the state house in 2002, Brandenburg had served as a member of the board of the Huron-Clinton Metro Parks Authority.

Brandenburg and his wife Karen Linenger are the parents of four children. Brandenburg is a Roman Catholic.
