= 2016 United States House of Representatives elections in Michigan =

- November 8, 2016

All 14 Michigan seats to the United States House of Representatives
	Majority party	Minority party
Party	Republican	Democratic
Last election	9	5
Seats won	9	5
Seat change	Steady	Steady
Popular vote	2,243,402	2,193,980
Percentage	48.03%	46.97%
Swing	▲0.55%	▼2.20%

Republican
40–50%
50–60%
60–70%
70–80%
Democratic
40–50%
50–60%
60–70%
70–80%

The 2016 United States House of Representatives elections in Michigan were held on November 8, 2016, to elect the 14 U.S. representatives from the state of Michigan, one from each of the state's 14 congressional districts. The elections coincided with the 2016 U.S. presidential election, as well as other elections to the House of Representatives, elections to the United States Senate in 33 other states and various state and local elections. The deadline for candidates to file for the August 2 primary election was April 19.

== Results summary ==
Results of the 2016 House of Representatives elections in Michigan by district:

District	Democratic		Republican		Others		Total		Result
District	Votes	%	Votes	%	Votes	%	Votes	%	Result
District 1	144,334	40.1%	197,777	54.9%	13,386	3.7%	355,497	100.00%	Republican hold
District 2	110,391	32.5%	212,508	62.6%	8,154	2.4%	331,053	100.00%	Republican hold
District 3	128,400	37.5%	203,545	59.5%	10,420	3.0%	342,365	100.00%	Republican hold
District 4	101,277	32.1%	194,572	61.6%	8,516	2.7%	304,365	100.00%	Republican hold
District 5	195,279	61.2%	112,102	35.1%	7,006	2.2%	314,387	100.00%	Democratic hold
District 6	119,580	36.4%	193,259	58.7%	10,420	3.0%	323,259	100.00%	Republican hold
District 7	134,010	40.0%	184,321	55.1%	16,476	4.9%	334,807	100.00%	Republican hold
District 8	143,791	39.2%	205,629	56.0%	9,619	2.6%	359,039	100.00%	Republican hold
District 9	199,661	57.9%	128,937	37.4%	9,563	2.8%	338,161	100.00%	Democratic hold
District 10	110,112	32.3%	215,132	63.1%	15,739	4.6%	340,983	100.00%	Republican hold
District 11	152,461	40.2%	200,872	52.9%	16,610	4.4%	369,943	100.00%	Republican hold
District 12	211,378	64.3%	96,104	29.3%	9,183	2.8%	316,665	100.00%	Democratic hold
District 13	198,771	77.1%	40,541	15.7%	9,648	3.7%	248,960	100.00%	Democratic hold
District 14	244,135	78.5%	58,103	18.7%	4,893	1.6%	307,131	100.00%	Democratic hold
Total	2,193,980	47.8%	2,243,402	48.9%	149,633	3.3%	4,587,015	100.00%	

== District 1 ==
2016 Michigan's 1st congressional district election
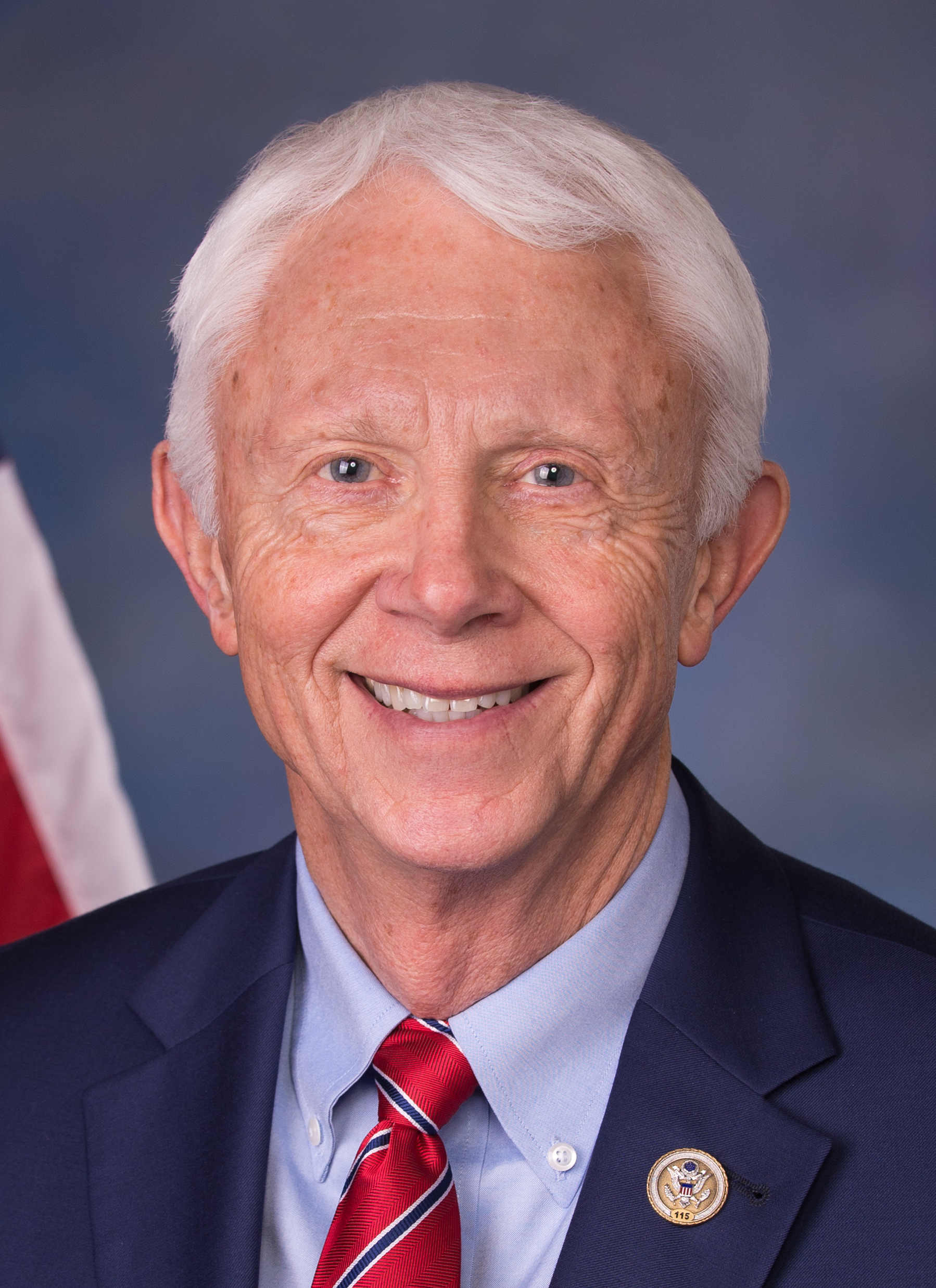

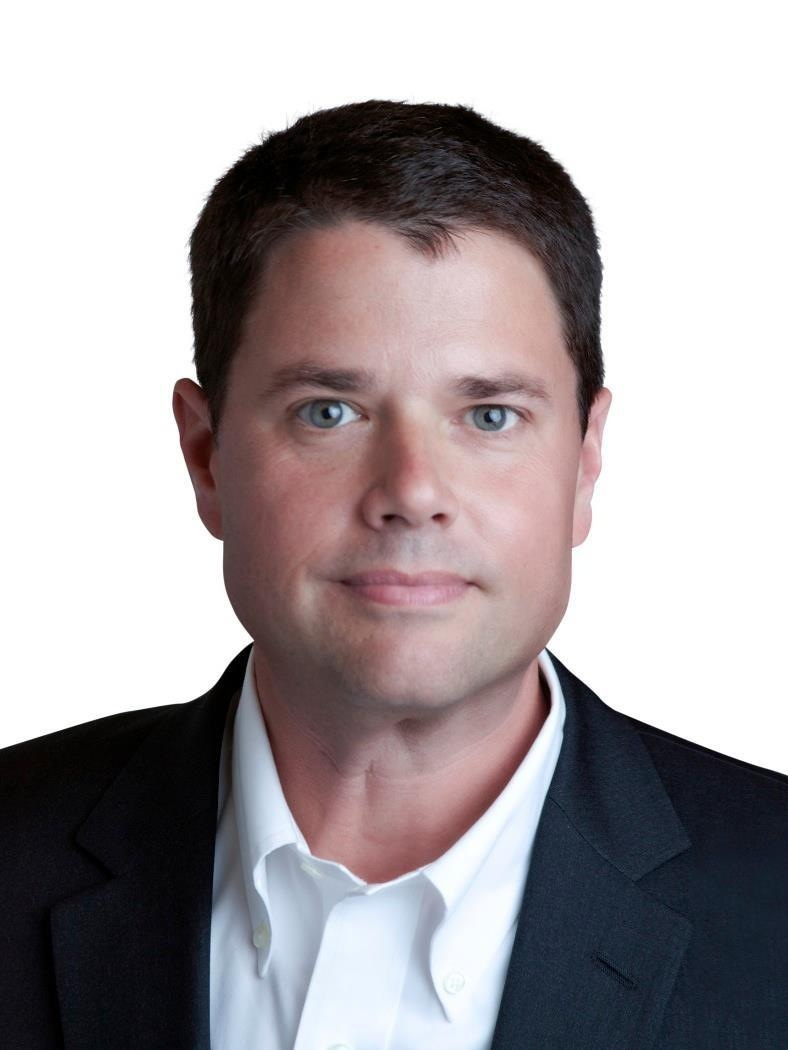
Nominee	Jack Bergman	Lon Johnson
Party	Republican	Democratic
Popular vote	197,777	144,334
Percentage	54.9%	40.1%
- Bergman: 40–50% 50–60% 60–70% 70–80% Johnson: 40–50% 50–60% 60–70% 70–80% Tie 40–50%
U.S. Representative before election
Dan Benishek
Republican
Elected U.S. Representative
Jack Bergman
Republican

When Republican Dan Benishek first ran to represent Michigan's 1st congressional district in the 2010 elections, he pledged to serve no more than three terms. In March 2015, he decided to run for a fourth term as the district's representative. However, he changed his mind in September and decided not to seek re-election.

On June 24, Michigan Democratic Party chairman Lon Johnson declared his run for the seat. Former Democratic nominee Jerry Cannon also announced his candidacy. Republican state senator Tom Casperson announced his run in November 2015. Casperson was challenged in the Republican primary by former state legislator Jason Allen, who announced he was running in January 2016, and retired U.S. Marine Jack Bergman, who declared in March. In January 2016, Benishek endorsed Casperson's candidacy.

In the August 2 primary, Jack Bergman won the GOP nomination and Lon Johnson won the Democratic nomination.

=== Republican primary ===
==== Candidates ====
===== Nominee =====
- Jack Bergman, retired United States Marine Corps lieutenant general

===== Eliminated in primary =====
- Jason Allen, former state senator and candidate for this district in 2010
- Tom Casperson, state senator

===== Declined =====
- Dan Benishek, incumbent U.S. Representative (endorsed Casperson)

==== Endorsements ====
Tom Casperson

U.S. representatives

- Dan Benishek, incumbent U.S. representative for this district

==== Results ====
Republican primary results
Party	Candidate	Votes	%
Republican	Jack Bergman	33,632	38.6
Republican	Tom Casperson	27,813	32.0
Republican	Jason Allen	25,607	29.4
Total votes		87,052	100.0

=== Democratic primary ===
==== Candidates ====
===== Nominee =====
- Lon Johnson, former Michigan Democratic Party chairman

===== Eliminated in primary =====
- Jerry Cannon, retired Michigan Army National Guard Major General, former Kalkaska County Sheriff and nominee for this seat in 2014

===== Declined =====
- Scott Dianda, state representative

==== Endorsements ====
Lon Johnson

U.S. representatives

- Bart Stupak, former U.S. representative for this district (1993–2011)

==== Results ====
Democratic primary results
Party	Candidate	Votes	%
Democratic	Lon Johnson	31,677	71.6
Democratic	Jerry Cannon	12,539	28.4
Total votes		44,216	100.0

=== Libertarian convention ===
==== Nominated ====
- Diane Bostow, Gwinn resident

=== General election ===
==== Debate ====
2016 Michigan's 1st congressional district debate
No.	Date	Host	Moderator	Link	Republican	Democratic	Libertarian	Green
Key: P Participant A Absent N Not invited I Invited W Withdrawn								
Key: P Participant A Absent N Not invited I Invited W Withdrawn					Jack Bergman	Lon Johnson	Diane Bostow	Ellis Boal
1	Oct. 18, 2016	The Mining Journal; Peter White Public Library			P	P	P	A

==== Endorsements ====
Lon Johnson (D)

Labor unions

- AFL-CIO

Newspapers

- Detroit Free Press

==== Predictions ====
Source	Ranking	As of
The Cook Political Report	Lean R	November 7, 2016
Daily Kos Elections	Tossup	November 7, 2016
Rothenberg	Tilt R	November 3, 2016
Sabato's Crystal Ball	Lean R	November 7, 2016
RCP	Tossup	October 31, 2016

==== Results ====
Michigan's 1st congressional district, 2016
Party	Candidate	Votes	%
Republican	Jack Bergman	197,777	54.9
Democratic	Lon Johnson	144,334	40.1
Libertarian	Diane Bostow	13,386	3.7
Green	Ellis Boal	4,774	1.3
Total votes		360,271	100.0
Republican hold			

== District 2 ==
2016 Michigan's 2nd congressional district election
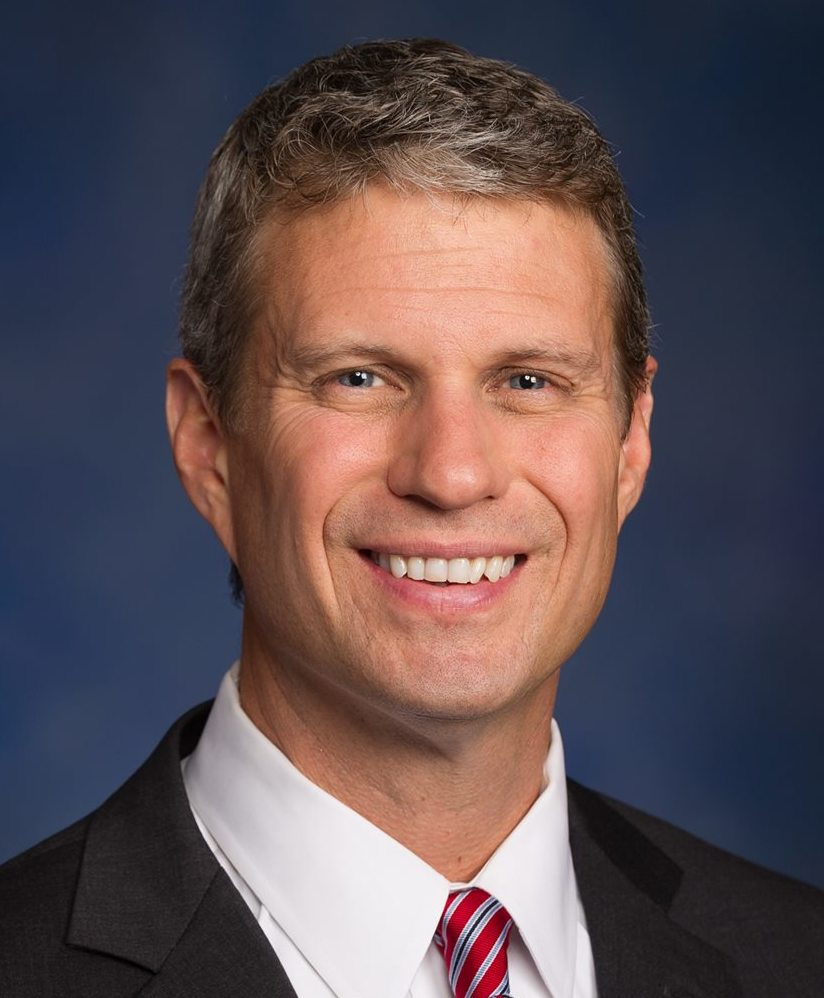

Nominee	Bill Huizenga	Dennis Murphy
Party	Republican	Democratic
Popular vote	212,508	110,391
Percentage	62.6%	32.5%
- Huizenga: 40–50% 50–60% 60–70% 70–80% 80–90% >90% Murphy: 40–50% 50–60% 60–70% 70–80% 80–90% >90% Tie: 40–50% No votes
U.S. Representative before election
Bill Huizenga
Republican
Elected U.S. Representative
Bill Huizenga
Republican

Republican incumbent Rep. Bill Huizenga ran for re-election. His Democratic opponent was Dennis Murphy, and his Libertarian opponent was Kentwood City Commissioner Erwin Haas.

=== Republican primary ===
==== Candidates ====
===== Nominee =====
- Bill Huizenga, incumbent U.S. Representative

==== Results ====
Republican primary results
Party	Candidate	Votes	%
Republican	Bill Huizenga (incumbent)	60,844	100.0
Total votes		60,844	100.0

=== Democratic primary ===
==== Candidates ====
===== Nominee =====
- Dennis Murphy, engineer

==== Results ====
Democratic primary results
Party	Candidate	Votes	%
Democratic	Dennis Murphy	26,498	100.0
Total votes		26,498	100.0

=== General election ===
==== Endorsements ====
Dennis Murphy (D)

Labor unions

- AFL-CIO

==== Predictions ====
Source	Ranking	As of
The Cook Political Report	Safe R	November 7, 2016
Daily Kos Elections	Safe R	November 7, 2016
Rothenberg	Safe R	November 3, 2016
Sabato's Crystal Ball	Safe R	November 7, 2016
RCP	Safe R	October 31, 2016

==== Results ====
Michigan's 2nd congressional district, 2016
Party	Candidate	Votes	%
Republican	Bill Huizenga (incumbent)	212,508	62.6
Democratic	Dennis Murphy	110,391	32.5
Libertarian	Erwin Haas	8,154	2.4
Green	Matthew A. Brady	5,353	1.6
U.S. Taxpayers'	Ronald Graeser	2,904	0.9
Independent	Joshua Arnold (write-in)	18	0.0
Total votes		339,328	100.0
Republican hold			

== District 3 ==
2016 Michigan's 3rd congressional district election
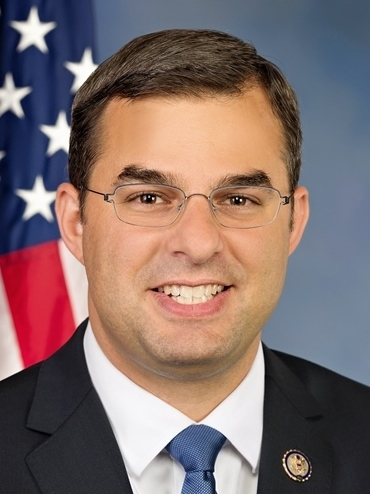

Nominee	Justin Amash	Douglas Smith
Party	Republican	Democratic
Popular vote	203,545	128,400
Percentage	59.5%	37.5%
- Amash: 40–50% 50–60% 60–70% 70–80% 80–90% Smith: 40–50% 50–60% 60–70% 70–80% 80–90% >90% Gerrard: >90% Tie: 50% No votes
U.S. Representative before election
Justin Amash
Republican
Elected U.S. Representative
Justin Amash
Republican

Republican incumbent Rep. Justin Amash ran for re-election. His Democratic opponent was Douglas Smith.

=== Republican primary ===
==== Candidates ====
===== Nominee =====
- Justin Amash, incumbent U.S. Representative

==== Results ====
Republican primary results
Party	Candidate	Votes	%
Republican	Justin Amash (incumbent)	55,889	100.0
Total votes		55,889	100.0

=== Democratic primary ===
==== Candidates ====
===== Nominee =====
- Douglas Smith

==== Results ====
Democratic primary results
Party	Candidate	Votes	%
Democratic	Douglas Smith	20,352	100.0
Total votes		20,352	100.0

=== General election ===
==== Predictions ====
Source	Ranking	As of
The Cook Political Report	Safe R	November 7, 2016
Daily Kos Elections	Safe R	November 7, 2016
Rothenberg	Safe R	November 3, 2016
Sabato's Crystal Ball	Safe R	November 7, 2016
RCP	Safe R	October 31, 2016

==== Results ====
Michigan's 3rd congressional district, 2016
Party	Candidate	Votes	%
Republican	Justin Amash (incumbent)	203,545	59.5
Democratic	Douglas Smith	128,400	37.5
U.S. Taxpayers'	Ted Gerrard	10,420	3.0
Total votes		342,365	100.0
Republican hold			

== District 4 ==
2016 Michigan's 4th congressional district election
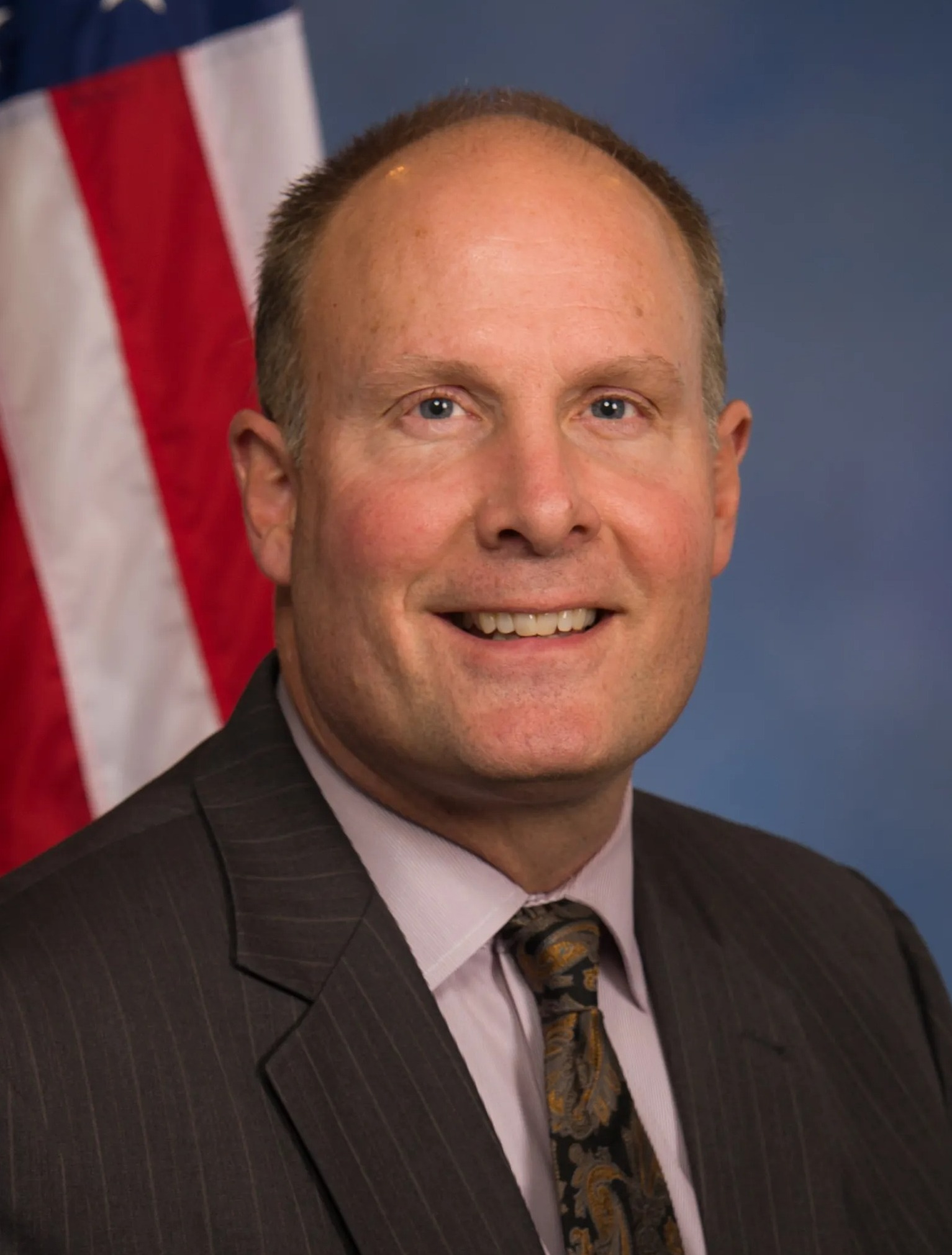

Nominee	John Moolenaar	Debra Friedell Wirth
Party	Republican	Democratic
Popular vote	194,572	101,277
Percentage	61.6%	32.1%
- Moolenaar: 40–50% 50–60% 60–70% 70–80% 80–90% Wirth: 40–50% 50–60% 60–70%
U.S. Representative before election
John Moolenaar
Republican
Elected U.S. Representative
John Moolenaar
Republican

Republican incumbent Rep. John Moolenaar ran for re-election. His Libertarian opponent was Leonard Schwartz. Keith Butkovich was the candidate for the Natural Law Party, George Zimmer for the U.S. Taxpayers Party and George Salvi for the Green Party. There was no Democratic opponent on the August primary ballot, but Debra Wirth launched a successful write-in campaign to be the Democratic nominee for the November election.

=== Republican primary ===
==== Candidates ====
===== Nominee =====
- John Moolenaar, incumbent U.S. Representative

==== Results ====
Republican primary results
Party	Candidate	Votes	%
Republican	John Moolenaar (incumbent)	57,886	100.0
Total votes		57,886	100.0

=== Democratic primary ===
==== Candidates ====
===== Nominee =====
- Debra Friedell Wirth, attorney and nominee for this seat in 2012 (write-in)

==== Results ====
Democratic primary results
Party	Candidate	Votes	%
Democratic	Debra Wirth (write-in)	2,013	100.0
Total votes		2,013	100.0

=== General election ===
==== Predictions ====
Source	Ranking	As of
The Cook Political Report	Safe R	November 7, 2016
Daily Kos Elections	Safe R	November 7, 2016
Rothenberg	Safe R	November 3, 2016
Sabato's Crystal Ball	Safe R	November 7, 2016
RCP	Safe R	October 31, 2016

==== Results ====
Michigan's 4th congressional district, 2016
Party	Candidate	Votes	%
Republican	John Moolenaar (incumbent)	194,572	61.6
Democratic	Debra Wirth	101,277	32.1
Libertarian	Leonard Schwartz	8,516	2.7
U.S. Taxpayers'	George M. Zimmer	5,595	1.8
Green	Jordan Salvi	3,953	1.2
Natural Law	Keith Butkovich	1,838	0.6
Total votes		315,751	100.0
Republican hold			

== District 5 ==
2016 Michigan's 5th congressional district election
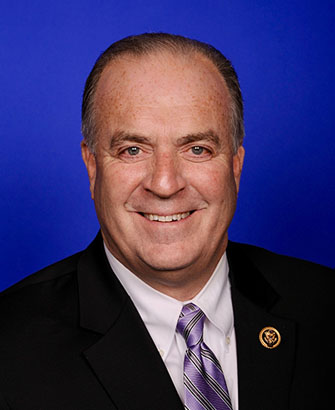

Nominee	Dan Kildee	Allen Hardwick
Party	Democratic	Republican
Popular vote	195,279	112,102
Percentage	61.2%	35.1%
- Kildee: 40–50% 50–60% 60–70% 70–80% 80–90% >90% Hardwick: 40–50% 50–60% 60–70% 70–80% Tie: 40–50%
U.S. Representative before election
Dan Kildee
Democratic
Elected U.S. Representative
Dan Kildee
Democratic

Democratic incumbent Rep. Dan Kildee ran for re-election. His Republican opponent was Al Hardwick.

=== Democratic primary ===
==== Candidates ====
===== Nominee =====
- Dan Kildee, incumbent U.S. Representative

==== Results ====
Democratic primary results
Party	Candidate	Votes	%
Democratic	Dan Kildee (incumbent)	59,090	100.0
Total votes		59,090	100.0

=== Republican primary ===
==== Candidates ====
===== Nominee =====
- Allen Hardwick, computer repairman and nominee for this seat in 2014

==== Results ====
Republican primary results
Party	Candidate	Votes	%
Republican	Al Hardwick	18,246	100.0
Total votes		18,246	100.0

=== Libertarian convention ===
==== Nominated ====
- Steve Sluka

=== General election ===
==== Endorsements ====
Dan Kildee (D)

Labor unions

- AFL-CIO

==== Predictions ====
Source	Ranking	As of
The Cook Political Report	Safe D	November 7, 2016
Daily Kos Elections	Safe D	November 7, 2016
Rothenberg	Safe D	November 3, 2016
Sabato's Crystal Ball	Safe D	November 7, 2016
RCP	Safe D	October 31, 2016

==== Results ====
Michigan's 5th congressional district, 2016
Party	Candidate	Votes	%
Democratic	Dan Kildee (incumbent)	195,279	61.2
Republican	Al Hardwick	112,102	35.1
Libertarian	Steve Sluka	7,006	2.2
Green	Harley Mikkelson	4,904	1.5
Total votes		319,291	100.0
Democratic hold			

== District 6 ==
2016 Michigan's 6th congressional district election
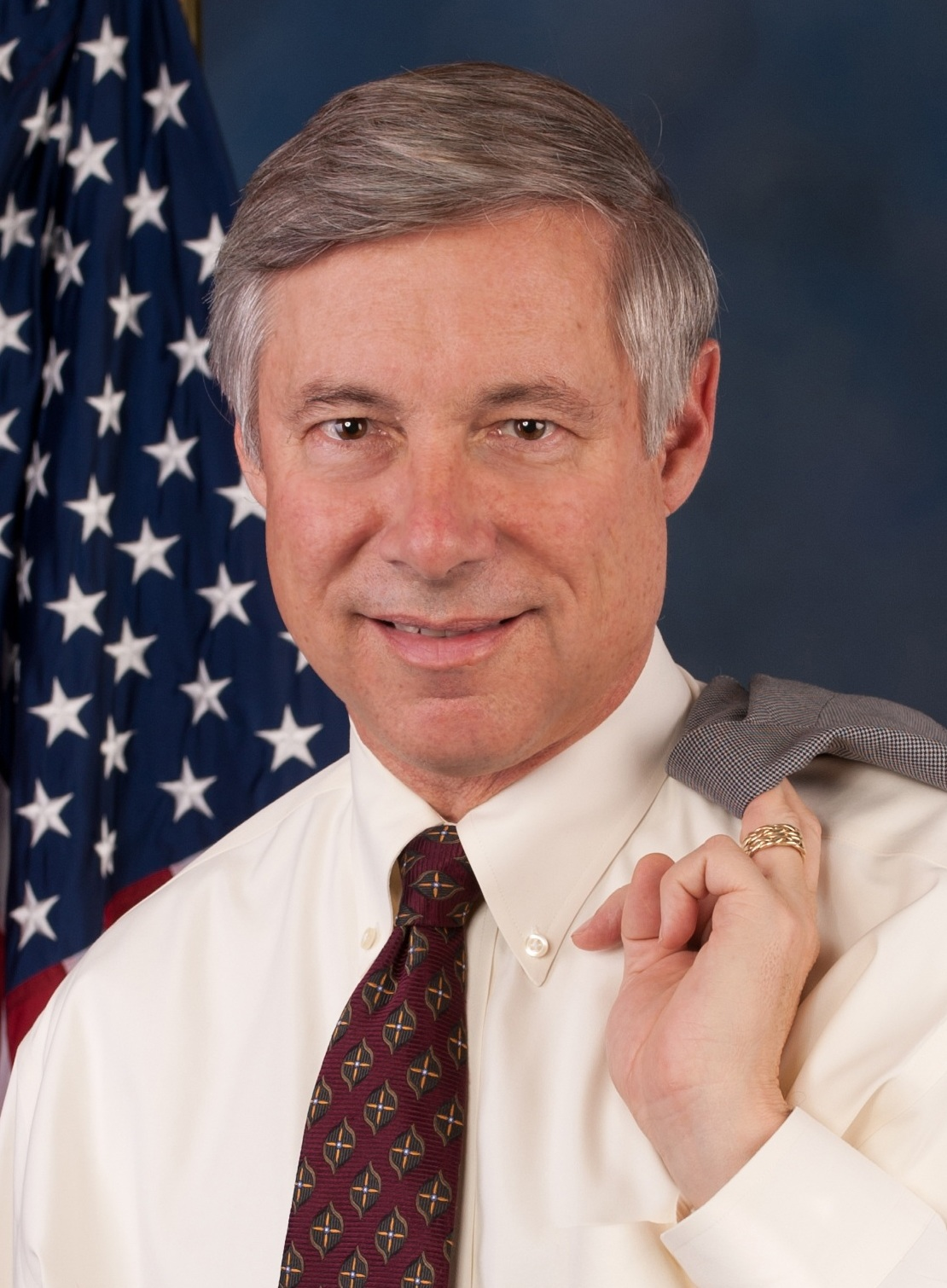

Nominee	Fred Upton	Paul Clements
Party	Republican	Democratic
Popular vote	193,259	119,980
Percentage	58.6%	36.5%
- Upton: 40–50% 50–60% 60–70% 70–80% 80–90% Clements: 40–50% 50–60% 60–70% 70–80% 80–90% No votes
U.S. Representative before election
Fred Upton
Republican
Elected U.S. Representative
Fred Upton
Republican

Incumbent Fred Upton sought re-election to his House seat. His Democratic challenger in 2014, Paul Clements, ran again.

=== Republican primary ===
==== Candidates ====
===== Nominee =====
- Fred Upton, incumbent U.S. Representative

==== Results ====
Republican primary results
Party	Candidate	Votes	%
Republican	Fred Upton (incumbent)	49,733	100.0
Total votes		49,733	100.0

=== Democratic primary ===
==== Candidates ====
===== Nominee =====
- Paul Clements, political science professor and nominee for this seat in 2014

==== Results ====
Democratic primary results
Party	Candidate	Votes	%
Democratic	Paul Clements	21,622	100.0
Total votes		21,622	100.0

=== Libertarian convention ===
==== Nominated ====
- Lorence Wenke, former state representative

=== General election ===
==== Endorsements ====
Paul Clements (D)

Labor unions

- AFL-CIO

==== Predictions ====
Source	Ranking	As of
The Cook Political Report	Safe R	November 7, 2016
Daily Kos Elections	Safe R	November 7, 2016
Rothenberg	Safe R	November 3, 2016
Sabato's Crystal Ball	Safe R	November 7, 2016
RCP	Likely R	October 31, 2016

==== Results ====
Michigan's 6th congressional district, 2016
Party	Candidate	Votes	%
Republican	Fred Upton (incumbent)	193,259	58.6
Democratic	Paul Clements	119,980	36.5
Libertarian	Lorence Wenke	16,248	4.9
Independent	Richard Miller Overton (write-in)	78	0.0
Total votes		329,565	100.0
Republican hold			

== District 7 ==
2016 Michigan's 7th congressional district election
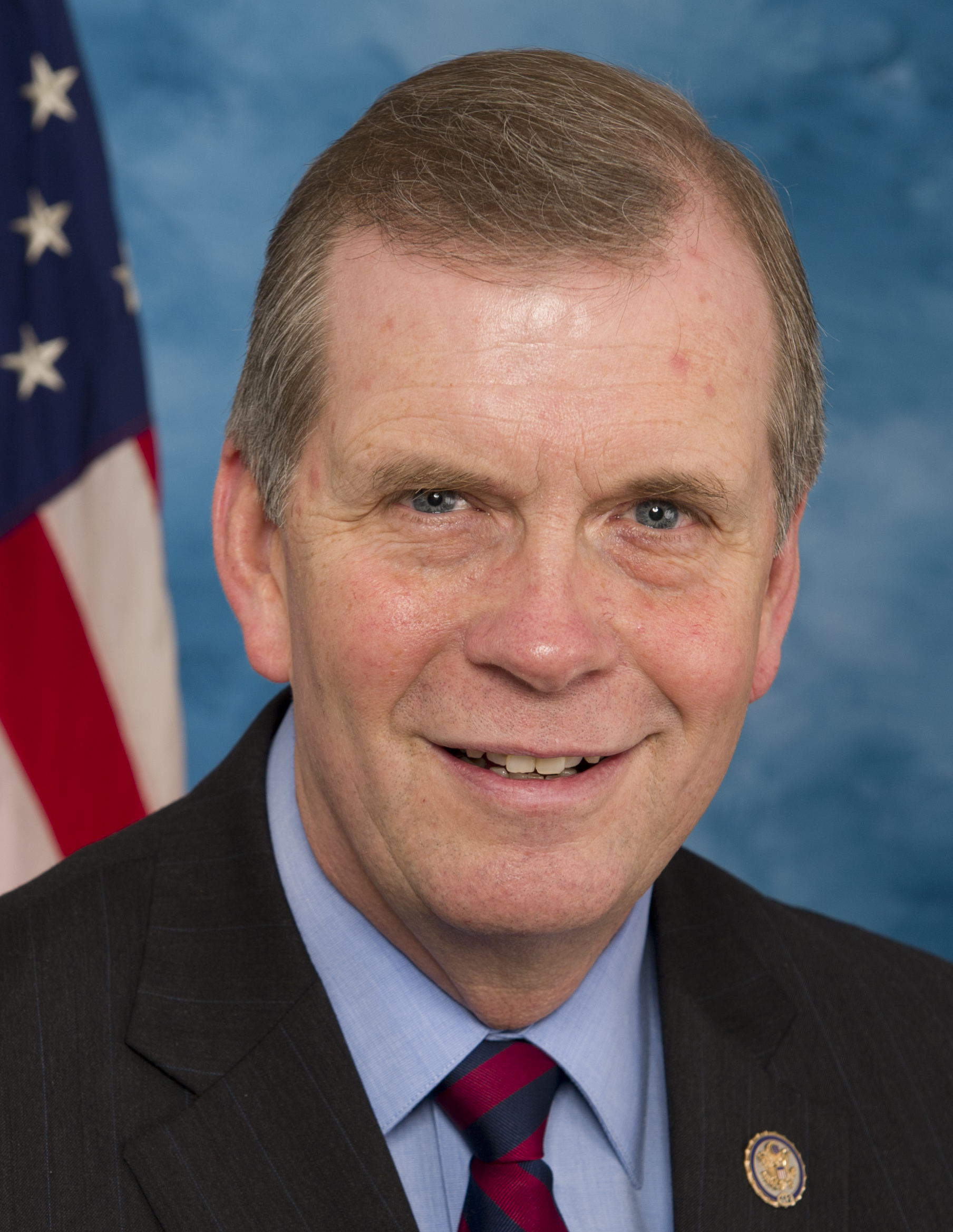

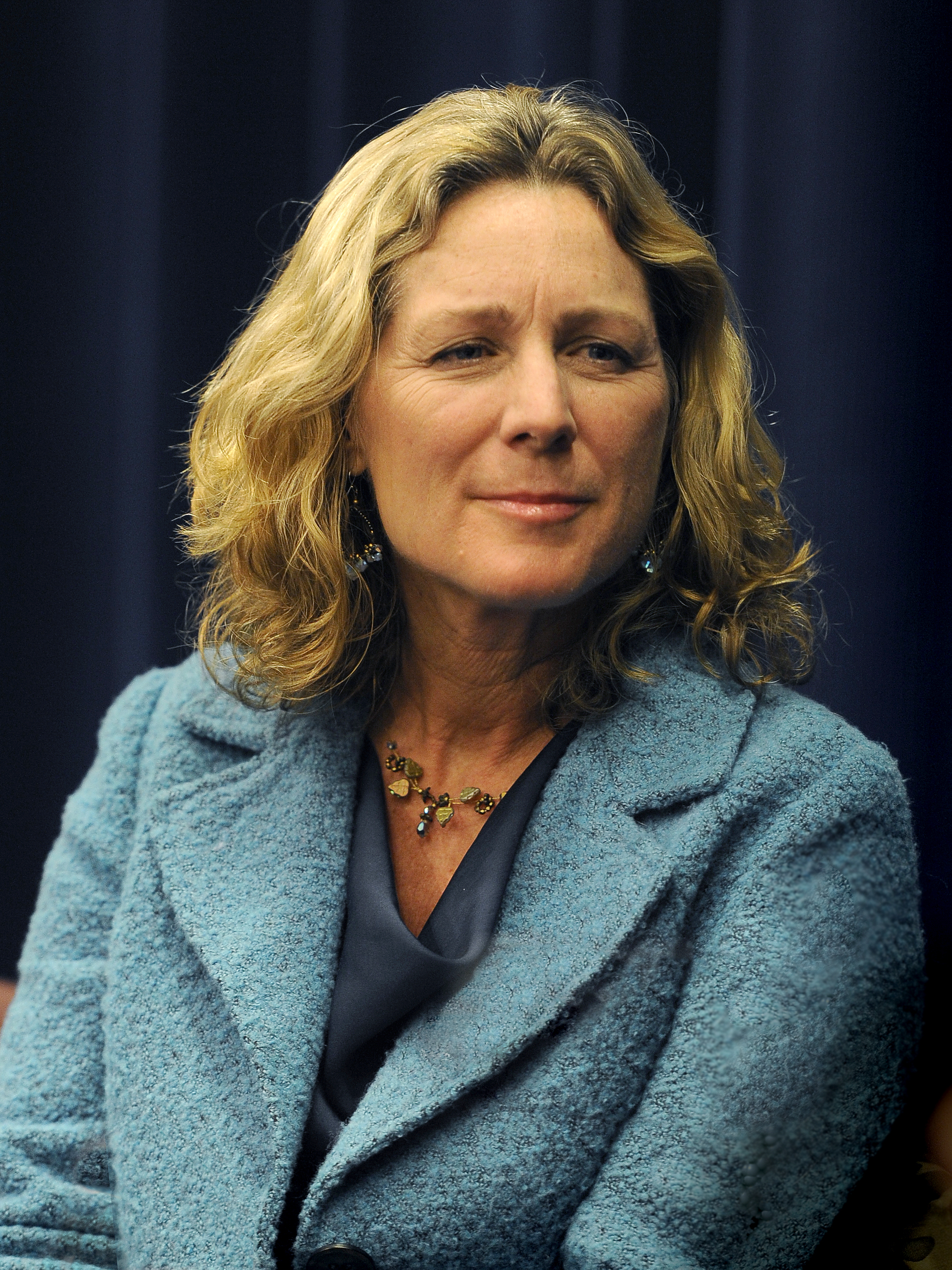
Nominee	Tim Walberg	Gretchen Driskell
Party	Republican	Democratic
Popular vote	184,321	134,010
Percentage	55.1%	40.0%
- Walberg: 40–50% 50–60% 60–70% 70–80% 80–90% Driskell: 40–50% 50–60% 60–70% 70–80% 80–90% No votes
U.S. Representative before election
Tim Walberg
Republican
Elected U.S. Representative
Tim Walberg
Republican

The 7th district is located in Southern Michigan. The incumbent was Republican Tim Walberg, who had represented the district since 2011 and previously represented the district from 2007 to 2009. He was re-elected with 53% of the vote in 2014, and the district has a PVI of R+3. Walberg was challenged by Doug North. Democratic state representative Gretchen Driskell, the former mayor of Saline, announced that she would run against Walberg in 2016, as would Libertarian Ken Proctor. Walberg won the Republican nomination.

=== Republican primary ===
==== Candidates ====
===== Nominee =====
- Tim Walberg, incumbent U.S. Representative

===== Eliminated in primary =====
- Doug North

==== Results ====
Republican primary results
Party	Candidate	Votes	%
Republican	Tim Walberg (incumbent)	43,120	75.2
Republican	Doug North	14,247	24.8
Total votes		57,367	100.0

=== Democratic primary ===
==== Candidates ====
===== Nominee =====
- Gretchen Driskell, state representative

===== Declined =====
- Pam Byrnes, former state representative and nominee for this seat in 2014

==== Results ====
Democratic primary results
Party	Candidate	Votes	%
Democratic	Gretchen Driskell	25,611	100.0
Total votes		25,611	100.0

=== Libertarian convention ===
==== Nominated ====
- Ken Proctor

=== General election ===
==== Endorsements ====
Gretchen Driskell (D)

Labor unions

- AFL-CIO

Organizations

- EMILY's List

Newspapers

- Detroit Free Press

==== Polling ====
Poll source	Date(s) administered	Sample size	Margin of error	Tim Walberg (R)	Gretchen Driskell (D)	Undecided
Harper Polling (R)	September 12–13, 2015	404	± 5.0%	49%	32%	20%
IMP/Revsix/Change Media	March 13–16, 2015	422	± 5.0%	37%	42%	21%

==== Predictions ====
Source	Ranking	As of
The Cook Political Report	Likely R	November 7, 2016
Daily Kos Elections	Lean R	November 7, 2016
Rothenberg	Likely R	November 3, 2016
Sabato's Crystal Ball	Lean R	November 7, 2016
RCP	Lean R	October 31, 2016

==== Results ====
Michigan's 7th congressional district, 2016
Party	Candidate	Votes	%
Republican	Tim Walberg (incumbent)	184,321	55.1
Democratic	Gretchen Driskell	134,010	40.0
Libertarian	Ken Proctor	16,476	4.9
Total votes		334,807	100.0
Republican hold			

== District 8 ==
2016 Michigan's 8th congressional district election
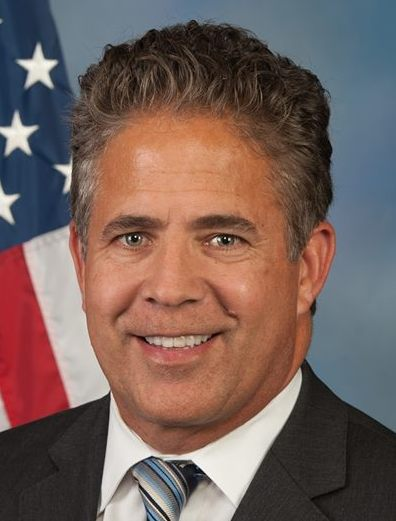

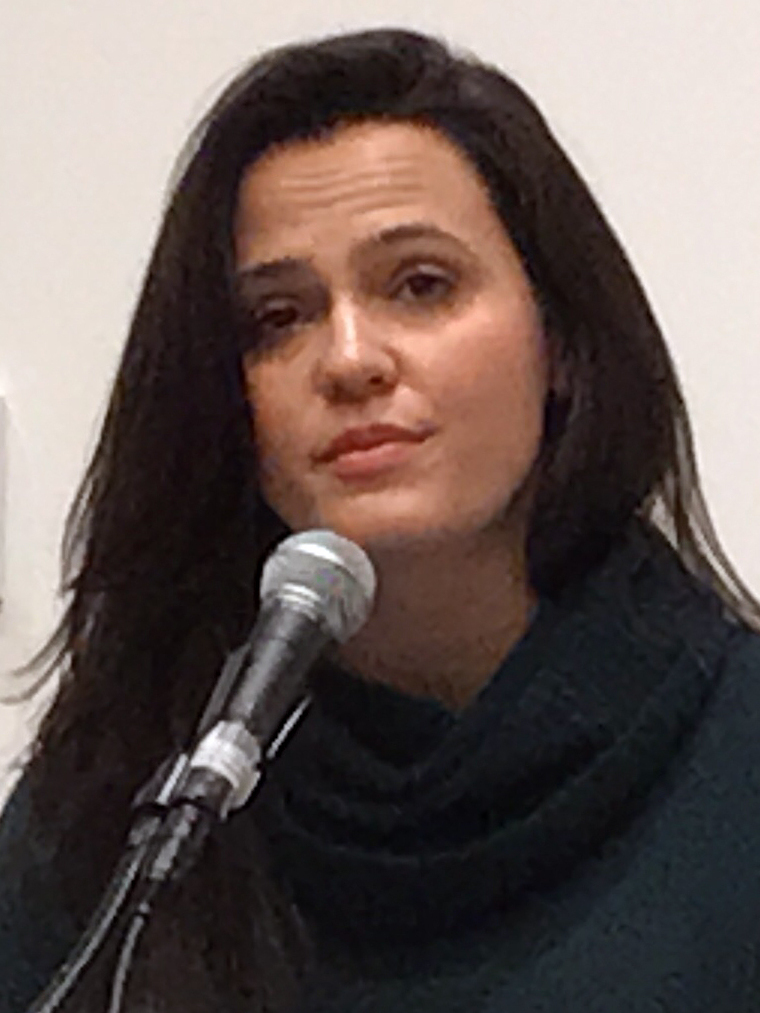
Nominee	Mike Bishop	Suzanna Shkreli
Party	Republican	Democratic
Popular vote	205,629	143,791
Percentage	56.0%	39.2%
- Bishop: 40–50% 50–60% 60–70% 70–80% Shkreli: 40–50% 50–60% 60–70% 70–80% 80–90%
U.S. Representative before election
Mike Bishop
Republican
Elected U.S. Representative
Mike Bishop
Republican

Freshman Republican incumbent Mike Bishop ran for re-election. He ran unopposed in the Republican primary.

=== Republican primary ===
==== Candidates ====
===== Nominee =====
- Mike Bishop, incumbent U.S. Representative

==== Results ====
Republican primary results
Party	Candidate	Votes	%
Republican	Mike Bishop (incumbent)	56,424	100.0
Total votes		56,424	100.0

=== Democratic primary ===
Two candidates were originally slated to face each other in the Democratic primary. They were former actress Melissa Gilbert (Little House on the Prairie) and a former president of the Screen Actors Guild, and Linda Keefe.

Gilbert withdrew from the race in May 2016 due to health issues, and at that time Keefe did not appear to have collected enough valid petition signatures to be placed on the ballot.

On July 6, 2016, Democrats introduced 29-year-old Suzanna Shkreli, an Assistant Macomb County Prosecutor to be the party's nominee. At the time of Shkreli's announcement, it was still unclear if Michigan Secretary of State Ruth Johnson would allow Gilbert to be removed from the ballot. Johnson said that the Office of the Secretary of State would not make a ruling until after the state's August 2 primary. Gilbert's name remained on the ballot.

On August 2, Gilbert received the most votes in the Democratic primary, receiving 28,810 votes, despite previously announcing her withdrawal from the race. Michigan Democratic Party Chairman Brandon Dillon said the day after that the party would begin the process to remove Gilbert from the November ballot and replace her with Shkreli within 48 hours. Bishop's campaign described Gilbert's attempt to be removed from the ballot as unprecedented. A Democratic campaign spokesman said they had retained legal counsel for the process.

The Michigan state elections director said that Gilbert's name could be removed from the ballot in the general election. On August 22, 2016, the state board of canvassers allowed Gilbert's name to be replaced on the November ballot with that of Shkreli.

==== Nominee ====
- Suzanna Shkreli, Assistant Macomb County Prosecutor

==== Failed to qualify ====
- Linda Keefe, former Windsor Township Clerk (disqualified from primary ballot for lack of signatures)

===== Withdrawn =====
- Melissa Gilbert, actress and former president of the Screen Actors Guild

==== Results ====
Democratic primary results
Party	Candidate	Votes	%
Democratic	Melissa Gilbert	28,810	100.0
Total votes		28,810	100.0

=== Libertarian convention ===
==== Nominated ====
- Jeff Wood

=== General election ===
==== Endorsements ====
Suzanna Shkreli (D)

Organizations

- EMILY's List

==== Predictions ====
Source	Ranking	As of
The Cook Political Report	Likely R	November 7, 2016
Daily Kos Elections	Likely R	November 7, 2016
Rothenberg	Safe R	November 3, 2016
Sabato's Crystal Ball	Likely R	November 7, 2016
RCP	Likely R	October 31, 2016

==== Polling ====
Poll source	Date(s) administered	Sample> size	Margin of error	Mike Bishop (R)	Suzanna Shkreli (D)	Undecided
Public Opinion Strategies (R-Bishop)/NRCC	September 10–12, 2016	400	± 4.9%	53%	34%	—

==== Results ====
Michigan's 8th congressional district, 2016
Party	Candidate	Votes	%
Republican	Mike Bishop (incumbent)	205,629	56.0
Democratic	Suzanna Shkreli	143,791	39.2
Libertarian	Jeff Wood	9,619	2.6
Green	Maria Green	5,679	1.6
Natural Law	Jeremy Burgess	2,250	0.6
Total votes		366,968	100.0
Republican hold			

== District 9 ==
2016 Michigan's 9th congressional district election
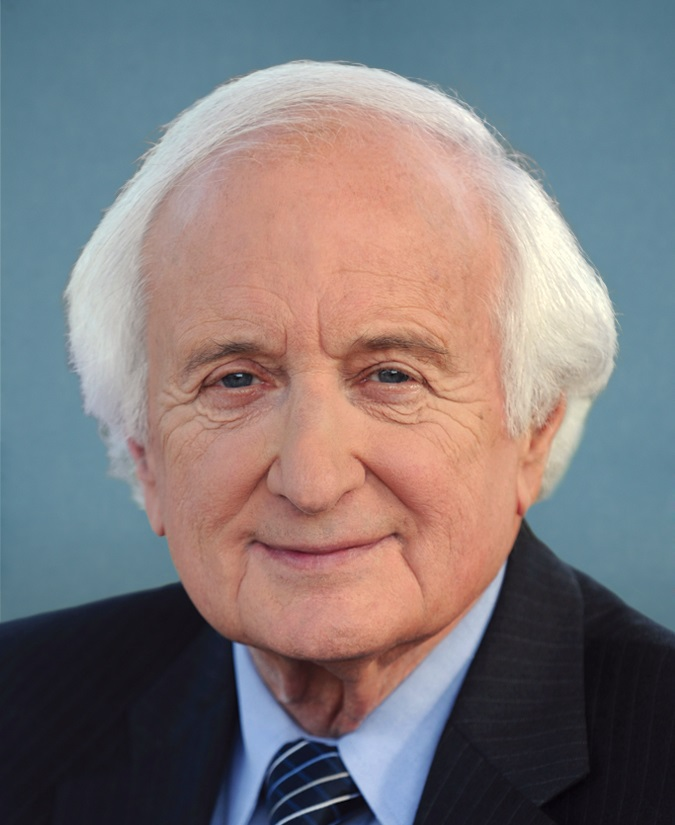

Nominee	Sander Levin	Christopher Morse
Party	Democratic	Republican
Popular vote	199,661	128,937
Percentage	57.9%	37.4%
- Levin: 40–50% 50–60% 60–70% 70–80% 80–90% >90% Morse: 40–50% 50–60% 60–70% No votes
U.S. Representative before election
Sander Levin
Democratic
Elected U.S. Representative
Sander Levin
Democratic

Democratic incumbent Rep. Sander Levin ran for re-election. His Republican challenger was Christopher Morse, and his Libertarian opponent was Matt Orlando.

=== Democratic primary ===
==== Candidates ====
===== Nominee =====
- Sander Levin, incumbent U.S. Representative

==== Results ====
Democratic primary results
Party	Candidate	Votes	%
Democratic	Sander Levin (incumbent)	48,393	100.0
Total votes		48,393	100.0

=== Republican primary ===
==== Candidates ====
===== Nominee =====
- Christopher Morse

==== Results ====
Republican primary results
Party	Candidate	Votes	%
Republican	Christopher Morse	32,964	100.0
Total votes		32,964	100.0

=== Libertarian convention ===
==== Nominated ====
- Matthew Orlando

=== General election ===
==== Predictions ====
Source	Ranking	As of
The Cook Political Report	Safe D	November 7, 2016
Daily Kos Elections	Safe D	November 7, 2016
Rothenberg	Safe D	November 3, 2016
Sabato's Crystal Ball	Safe D	November 7, 2016
RCP	Safe D	October 31, 2016

==== Endorsements ====
Sander Levin (D)

Labor unions

- AFL-CIO

==== Results ====
Michigan's 9th congressional district, 2016
Party	Candidate	Votes	%
Democratic	Sander Levin (incumbent)	199,661	57.9
Republican	Christopher Morse	128,937	37.4
Libertarian	Matthew Orlando	9,563	2.8
Green	John V. McDermott	6,614	1.9
Total votes		344,775	100.0
Democratic hold			

== District 10 ==
2016 Michigan's 10th congressional district election
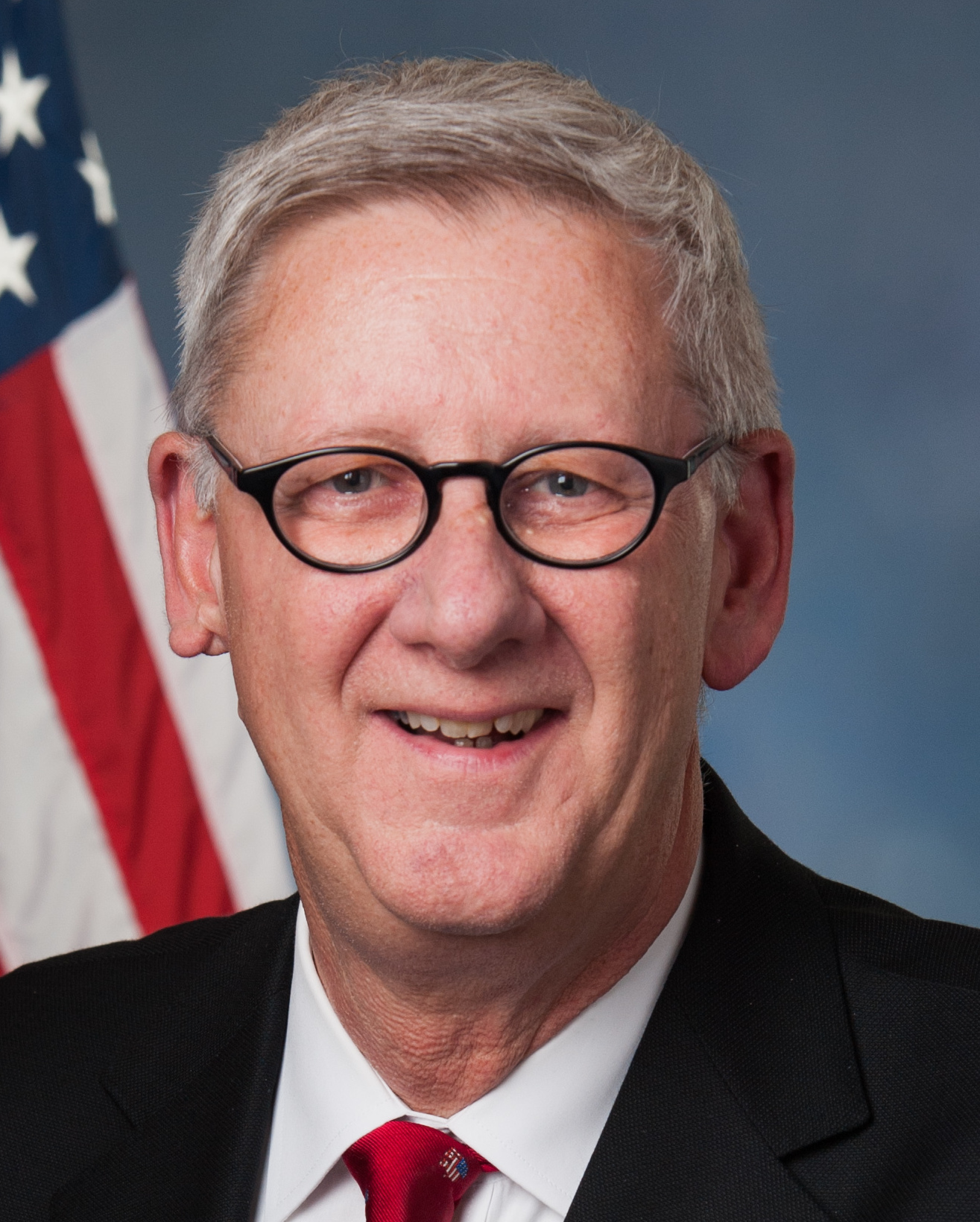

Nominee	Paul Mitchell	Frank Acavitti, Jr.
Party	Republican	Democratic
Popular vote	215,132	110,112
Percentage	63.1%	32.3%
- Mitchell: 40–50% 50–60% 60–70% 70–80% 80–90% >90% Acavitti: 40–50% 50–60% 60–70% Tie: 40–50% No votes
U.S. Representative before election
Candice Miller
Republican
Elected U.S. Representative
Paul Mitchell
Republican

Republican incumbent Candice Miller, who had represented the 10th district since 2003, did not run for reelection. State representative Tony Forlini, State Senator Phil Pavlov, businessman Paul Mitchell, former state senator Alan Sanborn, and retired military veteran David VanAssche were seeking the Republican nomination to succeed Miller. State Senator Jack Brandenburg considered entering the race, but declared in January 2016 that he would not run. Paul Mitchell won the Republican nomination.

=== Republican primary ===
==== Candidates ====
===== Nominee =====
- Paul Mitchell, businessman

===== Eliminated in primary =====
- Tony Forlini, state representative
- Phil Pavlov, state senator
- Alan Sanborn, former state senator
- David VanAssche

===== Withdrew =====
- Michael Flynn, Shelby Township Treasurer

==== Results ====
Republican primary results
Party	Candidate	Votes	%
Republican	Paul Mitchell	30,114	38.0
Republican	Phil Pavlov	22,018	27.8
Republican	Alan Sanborn	12,640	15.9
Republican	Tony Forlini	7,888	9.9
Republican	David VanAssche	6,690	8.4
Total votes		79,350	100.0

=== Democratic primary ===
==== Candidates ====
===== Nominee =====
- Frank Acavitti Jr.

==== Results ====
Democratic primary results
Party	Candidate	Votes	%
Democratic	Frank Acavitti, Jr.	20,710	100.0
Total votes		20,710	100.0

=== Libertarian convention ===
==== Nominated ====
- Lisa Gioia

=== General election ===
==== Endorsements ====
Frank Accavitti, Jr. (D)

Labor unions

- AFL-CIO

==== Predictions ====
Source	Ranking	As of
The Cook Political Report	Safe R	November 7, 2016
Daily Kos Elections	Safe R	November 7, 2016
Rothenberg	Safe R	November 3, 2016
Sabato's Crystal Ball	Safe R	November 7, 2016
RCP	Safe R	October 31, 2016

==== Results ====
Michigan's 10th congressional district, 2016
Party	Candidate	Votes	%
Republican	Paul Mitchell	215,132	63.1
Democratic	Frank Accavitti, Jr.	110,112	32.3
Libertarian	Lisa Lane Gioia	10,612	3.1
Green	Benjamin Nofs	5,127	1.5
Total votes		340,983	100.0
Republican hold			

== District 11 ==
2016 Michigan's 11th congressional district election
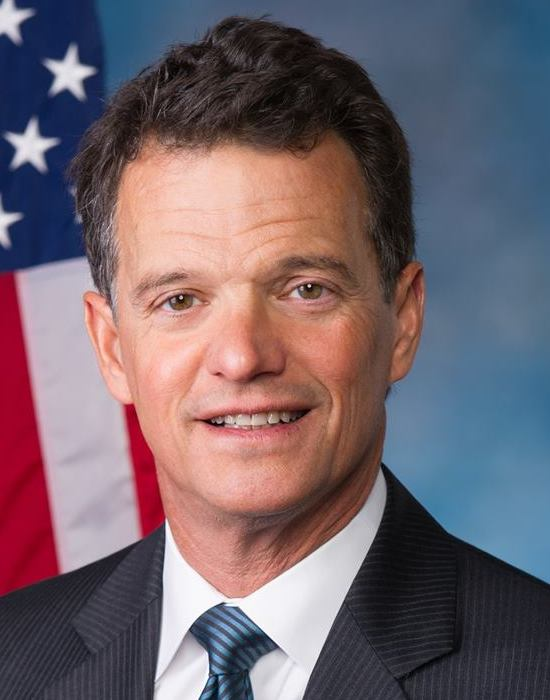

Nominee	Dave Trott	Anil Kumar
Party	Republican	Democratic
Popular vote	200,872	152,461
Percentage	52.9%	40.2%
- Trott: 40–50% 50–60% 60–70% 70–80% Kumar: 40–50% 50–60% 60–70% 70–80% Tie: 40–50% No votes
U.S. Representative before election
Dave Trott
Republican
Elected U.S. Representative
Dave Trott
Republican

The 11th district is located northwest of Detroit. The incumbent was Republican Dave Trott, who had represented the district since 2015. He was elected in 2014, winning the general election with 55.9% of the vote. He ran for re-election. Anil Kumar was his Democratic opponent, and Jonathan Osment was his Libertarian opponent. Kerry Bentivolio, who represented the 11th District from 2013 to 2015 and lost to Trott in the 2014 Republican primary, announced on July 21, 2016, that he planned to seek the seat as an independent after losing to Osment in the Libertarian convention.

=== Republican primary ===
==== Candidates ====
===== Nominee =====
- Dave Trott, incumbent U.S. Representative

==== Results ====
Republican primary results
Party	Candidate	Votes	%
Republican	Dave Trott (incumbent)	51,221	100.0
Total votes		51,221	100.0

=== Democratic primary ===
==== Candidates ====
===== Nominee =====
- Anil Kumar, physician

==== Results ====
Democratic primary results
Party	Candidate	Votes	%
Democratic	Anil Kumar	29,349	100.0
Total votes		29,349	100.0

=== Libertarian convention ===
==== Nominated ====
- Jonathan Osment

=== Independent ===
- Kerry Bentivolio, former U.S. Representative

=== General election ===
==== Predictions ====
Source	Ranking	As of
The Cook Political Report	Safe R	November 7, 2016
Daily Kos Elections	Safe R	November 7, 2016
Rothenberg	Safe R	November 3, 2016
Sabato's Crystal Ball	Safe R	November 7, 2016
RCP	Safe R	October 31, 2016

==== Endorsements ====
Anil Kumar (D)

Labor unions

- AFL-CIO

==== Results ====
Michigan's 11th congressional district, 2016
Party	Candidate	Votes	%
Republican	Dave Trott (incumbent)	200,872	52.9
Democratic	Anil Kumar	152,461	40.2
Independent politician	Kerry Bentivolio	16,610	4.4
Libertarian	Jonathan Ray Osment	9,545	2.5
Total votes		379,488	100.0
Republican hold			

== District 12 ==
2016 Michigan's 12th congressional district election
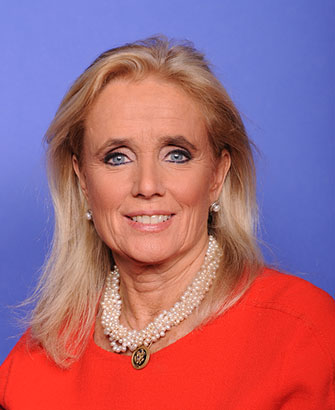

Nominee	Debbie Dingell	Jeff Jones
Party	Democratic	Republican
Popular vote	211,378	96,104
Percentage	64.3%	29.3%
- Dingell: 40–50% 50–60% 60–70% 70–80% 80–90% >90% Jones: 40–50% 50–60% Tie: 40–50% No votes
U.S. Representative before election
Debbie Dingell
Democratic
Elected U.S. Representative
Debbie Dingell
Democratic

Democratic first term congresswoman Debbie Dingell ran for re-election and was unopposed in the primary. Jeff Jones was the Republican challenger, a Taylor resident, a former independent United States Senate candidate in 2014. Also running was Tom Bagwell of Wyandotte, libertarian activist and former Ypsilanti Township Park Commissioner who won the Libertarian Party nomination for District 12 on May 14, 2016, in Lansing, Michigan.

=== Democratic primary ===
==== Candidates ====
===== Nominee =====
- Debbie Dingell, incumbent U.S. Representative

==== Results ====
Democratic primary results
Party	Candidate	Votes	%
Democratic	Debbie Dingell (incumbent)	55,046	100.0
Total votes		55,046	100.0

=== Republican primary ===
==== Candidates ====
===== Nominee =====
- Jeff Jones

==== Results ====
Republican primary results
Party	Candidate	Votes	%
Republican	Jeff Jones	15,115	100.0
Total votes		15,115	100.0

=== Libertarian convention ===
==== Nominated ====
- Tom Bagwell

=== General election ===
==== Endorsements ====
Debbie Dingell (D)

Labor unions

- AFL-CIO

==== Predictions ====
Source	Ranking	As of
The Cook Political Report	Safe D	November 7, 2016
Daily Kos Elections	Safe D	November 7, 2016
Rothenberg	Safe D	November 3, 2016
Sabato's Crystal Ball	Safe D	November 7, 2016
RCP	Safe D	October 31, 2016

==== Results ====
Michigan's 12th congressional district, 2016
Party	Candidate	Votes	%
Democratic	Debbie Dingell (incumbent)	211,378	64.3
Republican	Jeff Jones	96,104	29.3
Working Class	Gary Walkowicz	9,183	2.8
Libertarian	Tom Bagwell	7,489	2.3
Green	Dylan Calewarts	4,377	1.3
Independent	Ejaz Virk (write-in)	11	0.0
Total votes		328,542	100.0
Democratic hold			

== District 13 ==
2016 Michigan's 13th congressional district election
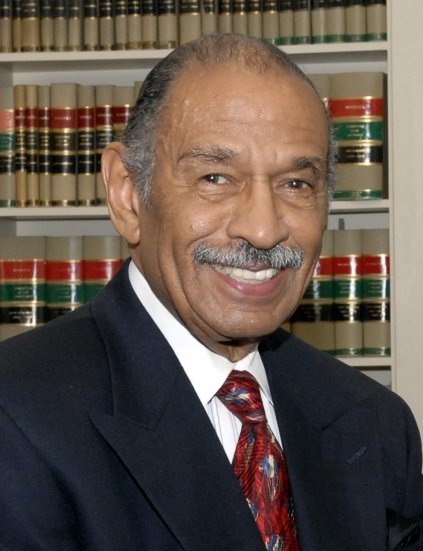

Nominee	John Conyers	Jeff Gorman
Party	Democratic	Republican
Popular vote	198,771	40,541
Percentage	77.1%	15.7%
- Precinct results Conyers: 40–50% 50–60% 60–70% 70–80% 80–90% >90% Gorman: 40–50% 50–60% No votes
U.S. Representative before election
John Conyers
Democratic
Elected U.S. Representative
John Conyers
Democratic

John Conyers, a Democrat, the incumbent representative in the 13th district, had served 26 terms in Congress and was the Dean of the United States House of Representatives. Detroit and City Clerk Janice Winfrey ran against Conyers in the Democratic Party primary election. Jeff Gorman ran on the Republican side, and Tiffany Hayden ran on the Libertarian side. Conyers won the nomination.

=== Democratic primary ===
==== Candidates ====
===== Nominee =====
- John Conyers, incumbent U.S. Representative

===== Defeated in primary =====
- Janice Winfrey, Detroit city clerk

===== Failed to qualify =====
- Kenneth Garner

==== Results ====
Democratic primary results
Party	Candidate	Votes	%
Democratic	John Conyers (incumbent)	30,971	60.8
Democratic	Janice Winfrey	19,965	39.2
Total votes		50,936	100.0

=== Republican primary ===
==== Candidates ====
===== Nominee =====
- Jeff Gorman

==== Results ====
Republican primary results
Party	Candidate	Votes	%
Republican	Jeff Gorman	4,894	100.0
Total votes		4,894	100.0

=== Libertarian convention ===
==== Nominated ====
- Tiffany Hayden

=== General election ===
==== Predictions ====
Source	Ranking	As of
The Cook Political Report	Safe D	November 7, 2016
Daily Kos Elections	Safe D	November 7, 2016
Rothenberg	Safe D	November 3, 2016
Sabato's Crystal Ball	Safe D	November 7, 2016
RCP	Safe D	October 31, 2016

==== Endorsements ====
John Conyers (D)

Labor unions

- AFL-CIO

==== Results ====
Michigan's 13th congressional district, 2016
Party	Candidate	Votes	%
Democratic	John Conyers (incumbent)	198,771	77.1
Republican	Jeff Gorman	40,541	15.7
Libertarian	Tiffany Hayden	9,648	3.8
Working Class	Sam Johnson	8,835	3.4
Independent	Clyde Darnell Lynch (write-in)	2	0.0
Total votes		257,797	100.0
Democratic hold			

== District 14 ==
2016 Michigan's 14th congressional district election
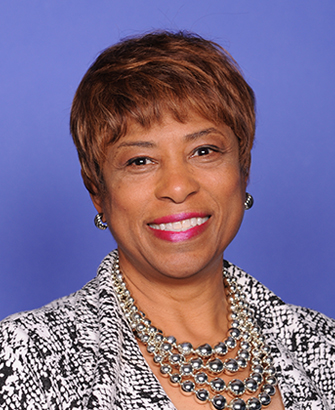

Nominee	Brenda Lawrence	Howard Klausner
Party	Democratic	Republican
Popular vote	244,135	58,103
Percentage	78.5%	18.7%
- Lawrence: 40–50% 50–60% 60–70% 70–80% 80–90% >90% Klausner: 40–50% 50–60% 60–70% 70–80% No votes
U.S. Representative before election
Brenda Lawrence
Democratic
Elected U.S. Representative
Brenda Lawrence
Democratic

Democratic incumbent Rep. Brenda Lawrence sought re-election and had two Democratic challengers, Terrance Morrison and Vanessa Moss. Lawrence won the Democratic nomination. The Republican candidate was Howard Klausner and the Libertarian candidate was Gregory Creswell.

=== Democratic primary ===
==== Candidates ====
===== Nominee =====
- Brenda Lawrence, incumbent U.S. Representative

===== Defeated in primary =====
- Terrance Morrison
- Vanessa Moss

==== Results ====
Democratic primary results
Party	Candidate	Votes	%
Democratic	Brenda Lawrence (incumbent)	55,544	87.4
Democratic	Vanessa Moss	5,253	8.3
Democratic	Terrance Morrison	2,770	3.6
Total votes		63,567	100.0

=== Republican primary ===
==== Candidates ====
===== Nominee =====
- Howard Klausner

==== Results ====
Republican primary results
Party	Candidate	Votes	%
Republican	Howard Klausner	10,964	100.0
Total votes		10,964	100.0

=== Libertarian convention ===
==== Nominated ====
- Gregory Creswell

=== General election ===
==== Endorsements ====
Brenda Lawrence (D)

Labor unions

- AFL-CIO

==== Predictions ====
Source	Ranking	As of
The Cook Political Report	Safe D	November 7, 2016
Daily Kos Elections	Safe D	November 7, 2016
Rothenberg	Safe D	November 3, 2016
Sabato's Crystal Ball	Safe D	November 7, 2016
RCP	Safe D	October 31, 2016

==== Results ====
Michigan's 14th congressional district, 2016
Party	Candidate	Votes	%
Democratic	Brenda Lawrence (incumbent)	244,135	78.5
Republican	Howard Klausner	58,103	18.7
Libertarian	Gregory Creswell	4,893	1.6
Green	Marcia Squier	3,843	1.2
Total votes		310,974	100.0
Democratic hold			
