= Union Lake, Michigan =

- Unincorporated community
- Location within the state of Michigan
- Coordinates: 42°36′53″N 83°26′48″W
- Country: United States
- State: Michigan
- County: Oakland
- Townships: Commerce, Waterford, West Bloomfield, and White Lake
- Time zone: UTC-5 (EST)
  - Summer (DST): UTC-4 (EDT)
- ZIP code(s): 48327 (Waterford); 48387
- Area code: 248
- FIPS code: 26-84240
- GNIS feature ID: 1627218

Union Lake is an unincorporated community in Oakland County in the U.S. state of Michigan. It is located at the junction of four townships: Commerce, Waterford, West Bloomfield, and White Lake.

As an unincorporated community, Union Lake has no legally defined area or population statistics of its own, but it does have its own post office with the 48387 ZIP Code, which is used for P.O. Boxes only. Otherwise, the area uses the 48327 Waterford ZIP Code.
