= Garlin Gilchrist =

American politician (born 1982)

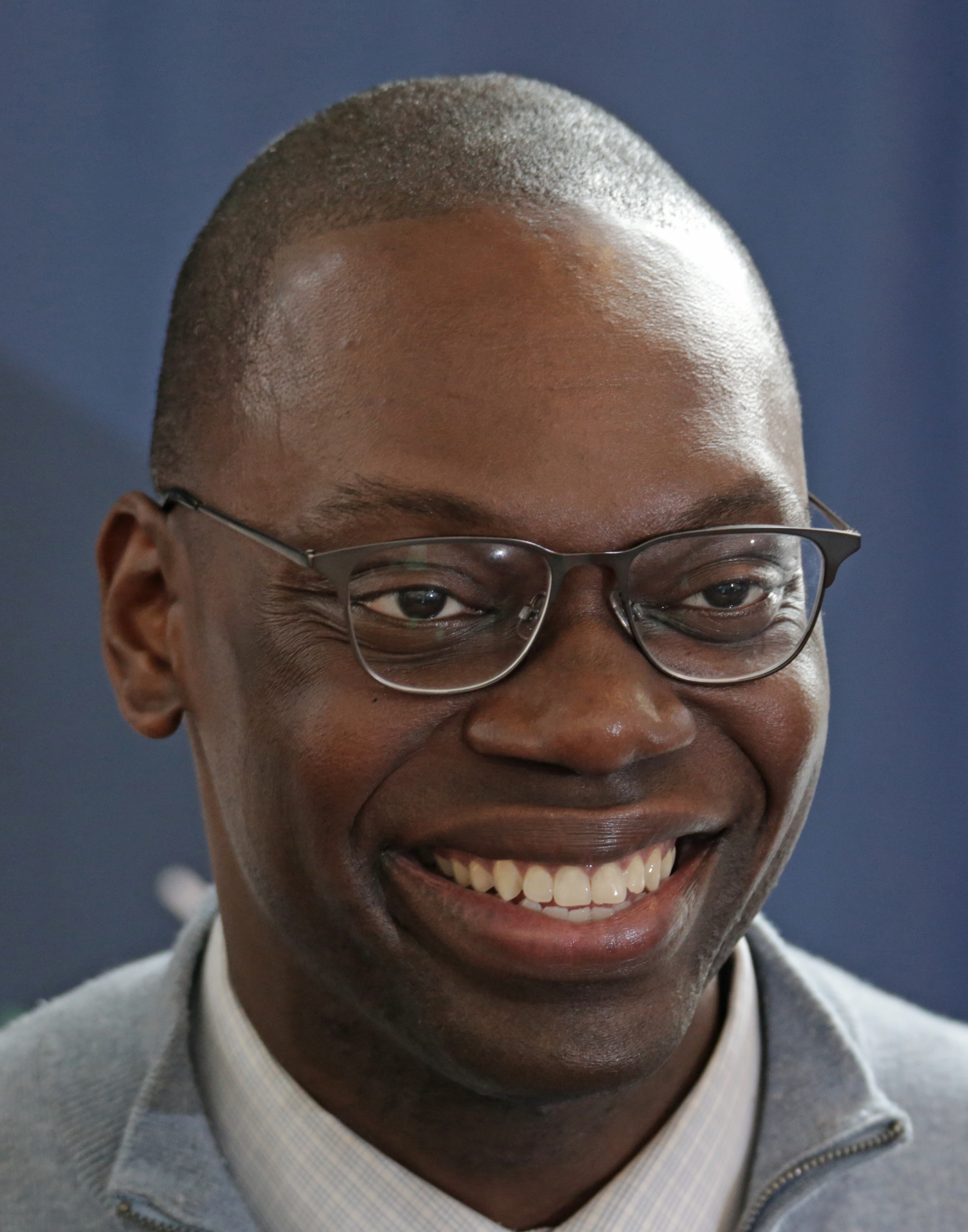
- Gilchrist in 2019

Secretary of State-elect of Michigan
- Assuming office January 1, 2027
- Governor: Jocelyn Benson (elect)
- Succeeding: Jocelyn Benson

64th Lieutenant Governor of Michigan
- Incumbent
- Assumed office January 1, 2019
- Governor: Gretchen Whitmer
- Preceded by: Brian Calley

65th Chair of the National Lieutenant Governors Association
- In office 2024–2025
- Preceded by: Adam Gregg
- Succeeded by: Pamela Evette

Personal details
- Born: Garlin Dorell Gilchrist II; September 25, 1982 (age 44) Detroit, Michigan, U.S.
- Party: Democratic
- Spouse: Ellen Gilchrist
- Children: 3
- Education: University of Michigan (BS)
- Website: Office website Campaign website

Garlin Dorell Gilchrist II (born September 25, 1982) is an American politician and engineer serving as the 64th Lieutenant Governor of Michigan since 2019. A member of the Democratic Party, formerly a candidate for the Democratic nomination in the 2026 Michigan gubernatorial election, he will serve as the next Secretary of State of Michigan following the 2026 Michigan Secretary of State election.

== Early life and education ==
Gilchrist was born in Detroit. In 1982, his family moved to Farmington, Michigan. His mother worked at General Motors for 32 years, and his father worked in defense contract management for the United States Department of Defense.

Gilchrist earned a Bachelor of Science in Engineering with majors in computer science and computer engineering from the University of Michigan in 2005.

== Early career ==
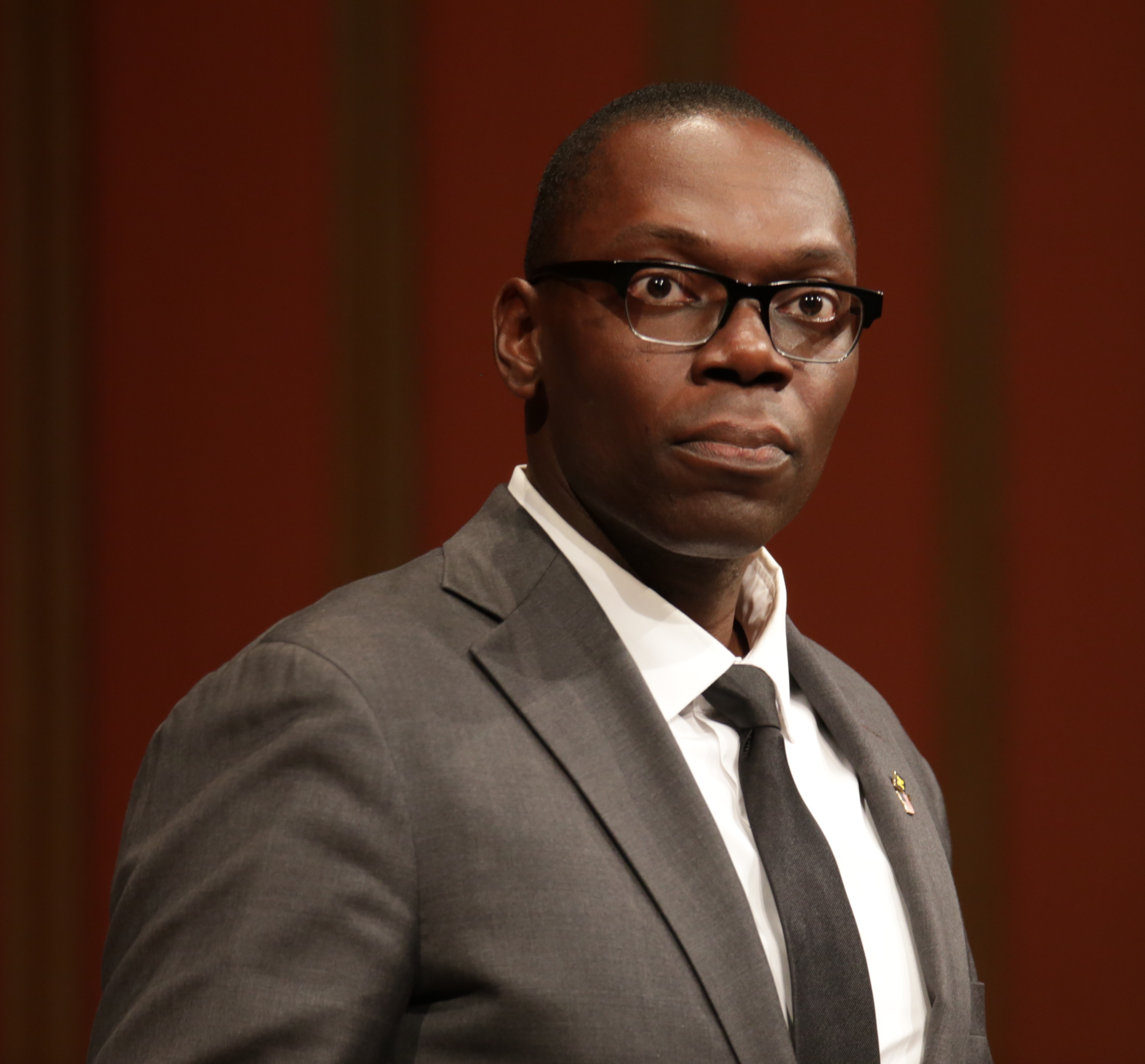
Gilchrist in 2018

Gilchrist moved to Redmond, Washington, and worked for Microsoft for four years as a software engineer, where he helped build SharePoint. He later worked as a community organizer and director of new media for the Center for Community Change, now known as Community Change. Later, Gilchrist worked for MoveOn.org in Washington, D.C., as national campaign director.

In July 2014, Gilchrist moved back to Detroit and entered a position for the city government under chief information officer Beth Niblock as the director of innovation and emerging technology. He created the Improve Detroit smartphone app that allows residents to report issues to the city. He served as founding executive director of the Center for Social Media Responsibility, within the University of Michigan School of Information, from the University of Michigan Detroit Center.

In 2017, Gilchrist ran for Detroit City Clerk against incumbent Janice Winfrey but lost by 1,482 votes.

== Lieutenant Governor of Michigan ==
Gretchen Whitmer selected Gilchrist as her running mate in the 2018 Michigan gubernatorial election. The pair defeated the Republican ticket of Bill Schuette and Lisa Posthumus Lyons. With Whitmer's victory, Gilchrist became the first African American to serve as the lieutenant governor of Michigan, as well as the first born in the 1980s. He took office on January 1, 2019.

Gilchrist was named a vice-chair of the 2020 Democratic National Convention.

On November 8, 2022, Whitmer and Gilchrist were re-elected by a wide margin in the 2022 Michigan gubernatorial election, defeating the Republican ticket of Tudor Dixon and Shane Hernandez.

=== Michigan Coronavirus Task Force on Racial Disparities ===
On April 9, 2020, Whitmer named Gilchrist as the chair of a statewide task force examining racial disparities in the COVID-19 pandemic. Gilchrist, later, claimed victory in reducing the racial disparities in COVID-19 deaths. According to a March 2021 study from the Duke-Margolis Center for Health Policy and the National Governors Association Center for Best Practices, the Michigan Coronavirus Racial Disparities Task Force “paved the way” for tacking racial inequities and reduced COVID-19 cases and mortality among Black residents. The study further remarked that the task force helped reduce the average number of cases for Black residents “from 176 per million...per day in March 2020 to 59 per million...per day in October 2020.”

=== Michigan Joint Task Force on Jail and Pretrial Incarceration ===
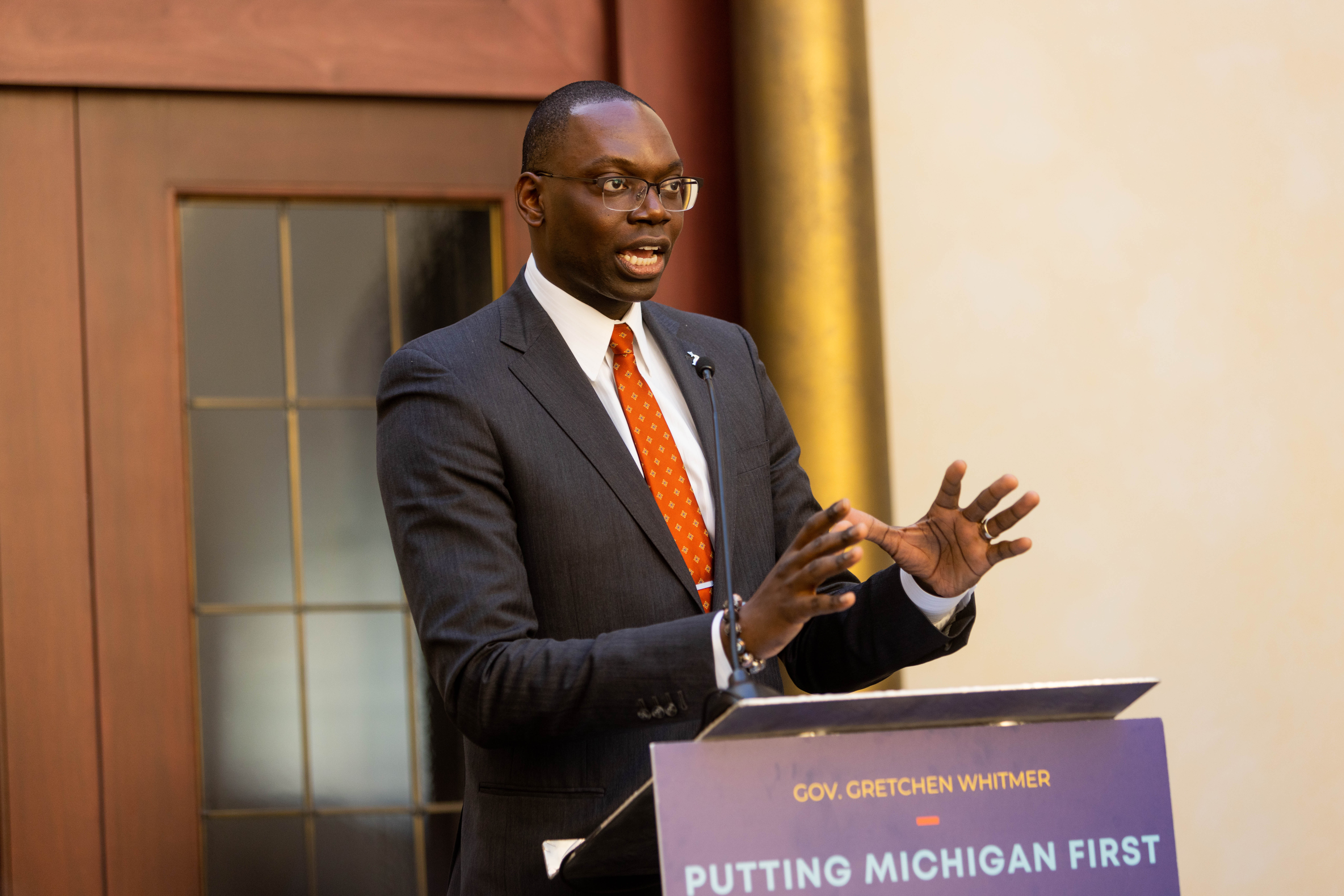
Lieutenant Governor Garlin Gilchrist in 2023

Gilchrist served as co-chair of the Michigan Joint Task Force on Jail and Pretrial Incarceration, a bipartisan working group of officeholders, law enforcement officials, and stakeholders that Governor Whitmer assembled in 2019 to examine the growing jail populations, which had tripled in 30 years, despite historically low crime rates. The group held over a dozen meetings with the public and stakeholders across Michigan in “one of the state's largest bipartisan collaborations on criminal justice reform to date.” The task force issued a final report with 18 recommendations, many of which included a large package of dozens of bipartisan criminal justice reform bills that passed and became law in January 2021.

The “historic” bipartisan package was dubbed “a model for state-level policy change affecting local jail populations” by Pew Charitable Trusts.

Republican leaders of both legislative chambers praised the bipartisan package as an example of "putting people before politics" and "thoughtful and purposeful policies built on the consensus and compromise of a diverse group of stakeholders." The legislation was aimed at protecting public safety, while helping thousands avoid arrest and incarceration for low-level nonviolent offenses. The bipartisan package included bills to:

- Eliminate license suspensions for violations unrelated to dangerous driving
- Classify traffic misdemeanors as civil violations
- Provide discretion to officers to issue tickets, instead of making arrests for many misdemeanors
- Limit occupational licensing boards’ consideration of applicants’ previous low-level offenses
- Seal juvenile records from public view and create a process to automatically expunge juvenile records for those who don't commit future offenses
- Limit the use of warrants for first time failure to appear for low level criminal violations
- Eliminate mandatory minimum prison sentences for violations of driving, environmental and public health state codes

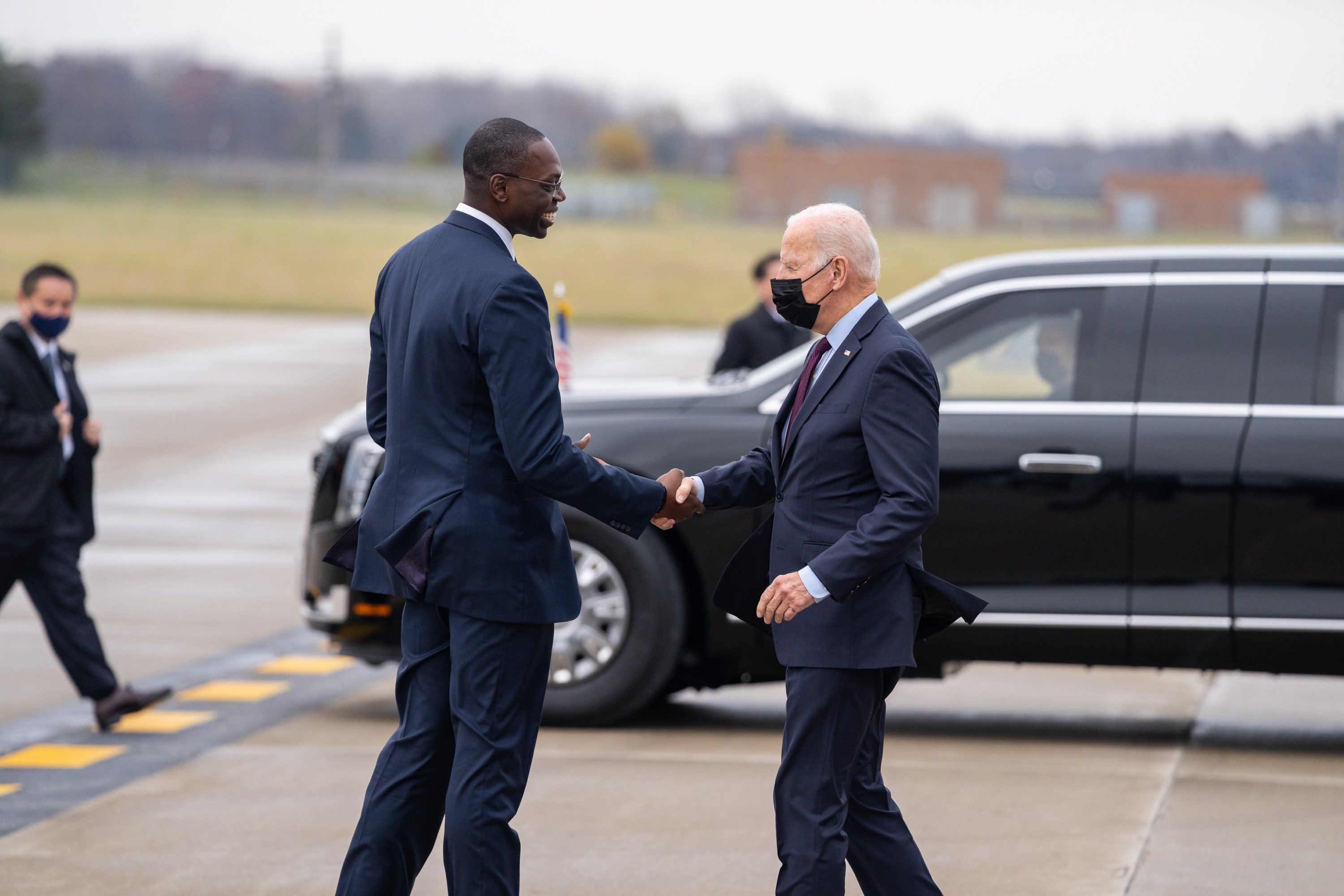
Gilchrist greets President Joe Biden at Detroit Metropolitan Wayne County Airport in November 2021

Gilchrist was selected as a Community Change Champion in Community Organizing in 2019 for his work to advance social and racial justice in the United States.

=== 2026 elections ===
On March 11, 2025, Gilchrist announced his candidacy for the 2026 Michigan gubernatorial election. He was endorsed by U.S. Representative Rashida Tlaib and by multiple Michigan state legislators. On January 12, 2026, Gilchrist withdrew from the governor's race and announced his candidacy for the 2026 Michigan Secretary of State election.

== Personal life ==
Gilchrist and his wife have three children.

== Electoral history ==
2017 City Clerk of Detroit election
Party	Candidate	Votes	%	±%
Nonpartisan	Janice Winfrey (incumbent)	49,874	50.57%	
Nonpartisan	Garlin Gilchrist	48,388	49.06%	
Majority		1,486	1.51%	
Turnout		98,621		

2018 Michigan gubernatorial election
Party	Candidate	Votes	%	±%
Democratic	Gretchen Whitmer Garlin Gilchrist	2,256,791	53.34%	+6.48%
Republican	Bill Schuette Lisa Posthumus Lyons	1,853,650	43.81%	−7.11%
Libertarian	Bill Gelineau Angelique Chaiser Thomas	56,752	1.34%	+0.21%
Constitution	Todd Schleiger Earl P. Lackie	24,701	0.58%	−0.03%
Green	Jennifer V. Kurland Charin H. Davenport	28,857	0.68%	+0.21%
Natural Law	Keith Butkovitch Raymond Warner	10,258	0.24%	−
Majority		403,141	9.53%	+5.47%
Turnout		4,231,009		34.04%
Democratic gain from Republican		Swing		

2022 Michigan gubernatorial election
Party	Candidate	Votes	%	±%
Democratic	Gretchen Whitmer (incumbent); Garlin Gilchrist (incumbent)	2,430,505	54.47%	+1.16%
Republican	Tudor Dixon; Shane Hernandez	1,960,635	43.94%	+0.19%
Libertarian	Mary Buzuma; Brian Ellison	38,800	0.87%	−0.46%
Constitution	Donna Brandenburg; Mellissa Carone	16,246	0.36%	−0.33%
Green	Kevin Hogan; Destiny Clayton	10,766	0.24%	−0.44%
Natural Law	Daryl M. Simpson; Doug Dern	4,973	0.11%	−0.13%
Write-in		47	0.00%	±0.0%
Total votes		4,461,972	100.0%	
Turnout		4,461,972	%	
Registered electors				
Democratic hold				

== See also ==
- List of minority governors and lieutenant governors in the United States

Party political offices
Preceded by Lisa Brown	Democratic nominee for Lieutenant Governor of Michigan; 2018, 2022	Succeeded by Winnie Brinks
Preceded by Jocelyn Benson	Democratic nominee for Secretary of State of Michigan; 2026	Most recent
Political offices
Preceded by Brian Calley	Lieutenant Governor of Michigan; 2019–present	Incumbent
Preceded by Jocelyn Benson	Secretary of State of Michigan; Taking office 2027	Elect
