= Harrison Township, Michigan =

- Charter township
- Harrison Charter Township
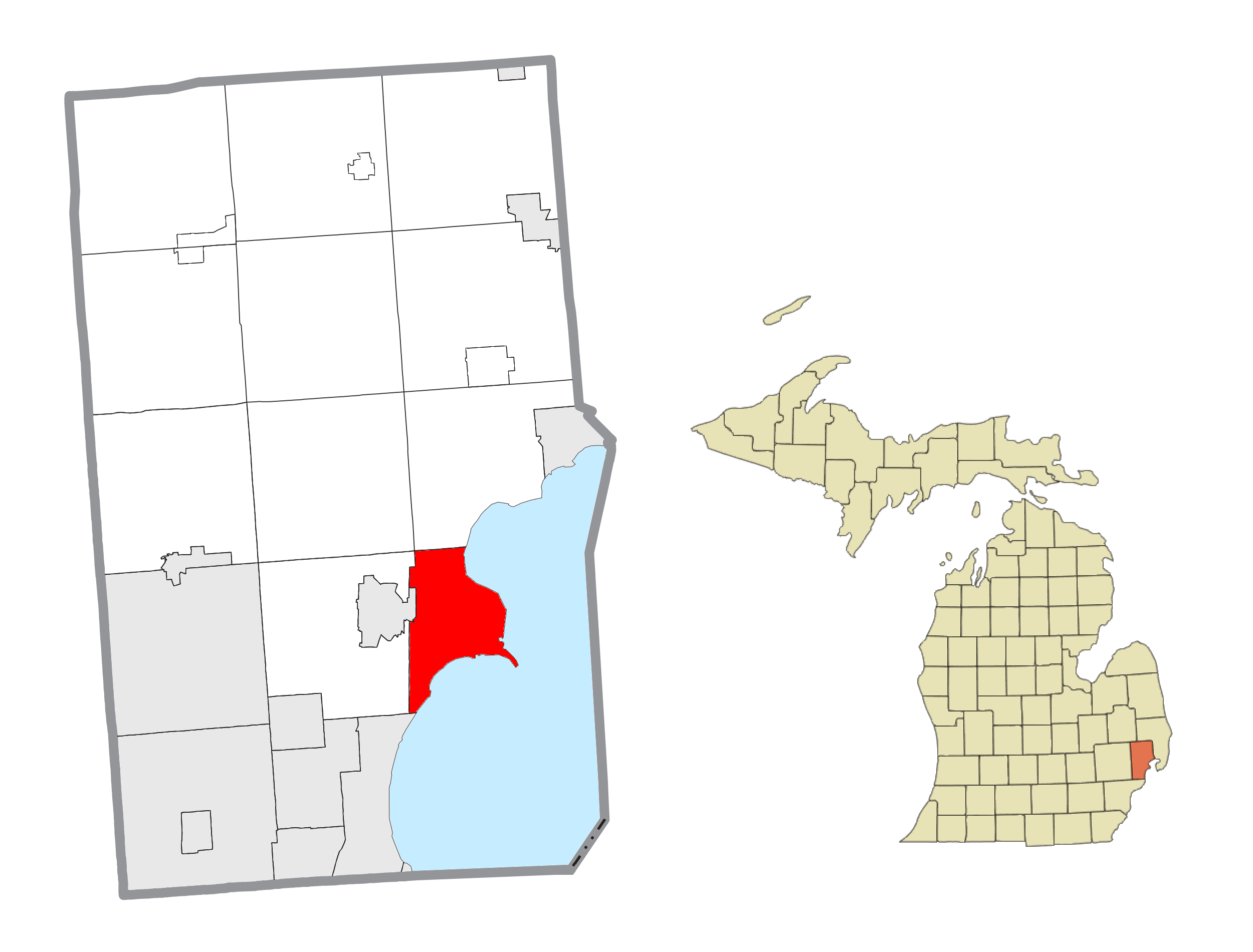
- Location within Macomb County

- Location within the state of Michigan Location within the United States
- Coordinates: 42°35′01″N 82°49′45″W
- Country: United States
- State: Michigan
- County: Macomb
- Established: 1827

Government
  - Supervisor: Kenneth Verkest
  - Clerk: Adam Wit

Area
  - Total: 23.76 sq mi (61.5 km^{2})
  - Land: 14.25 sq mi (36.9 km^{2})
  - Water: 9.51 sq mi (24.6 km^{2})
- Elevation: 577 ft (176 m)

Population (2020)
  - Total: 24,314
  - Density: 1,706.5/sq mi (658.9/km^{2})
- Time zone: UTC-5 (Eastern (EST))
  - Summer (DST): UTC-4 (EDT)
- ZIP Code: 48045
- Area code: 586
- FIPS code: 26-36820
- GNIS feature ID: 1626439
- Website: www.harrisontownshipmi.gov

Harrison Charter Township is a charter township of Macomb County in the U.S. state of Michigan. The population was 24,314 at the 2020 census.

Harrison Township was formed in 1827 in the Michigan Territory along the shores of Lake St. Clair. The township became a charter township in 1978.

== Geography ==
The township is in southeastern Macomb County, along the northwestern shores of Lake St. Clair. The Clinton River has its mouth in the lake within Harrison Township, and Lake St. Clair Metropark is within the township, along the lakeshore. The township is partially bordered to the west by the city of Mount Clemens, the Macomb county seat.

According to the U.S. Census Bureau, the township has a total area of 23.76 square miles (61.5 km^{2}), of which 14.25 square miles (36.9 km^{2}) are land and 9.51 square miles (24.6 km^{2}), or 40.03%, are water.

Selfridge Air National Guard Base, which was first built in 1917, is an Air National Guard installation that occupies a large portion of the northern section of the township.

== Communities ==
- Belvidere, originally called Huron Point, was a historic settlement formed within the township in 1835 by David and James Conger from Cleveland, who bought land near the mouth of the Clinton River. It was platted the next year and given a post office in 1837. Many lots of land were sold to future settlers, but the area had to be abandoned soon after, when it was flooded in 1838.
- Harrison Township was part of the original Michigan Territory, formed in 1827. It became a charter township government on November 13, 1978.
- Lakeside is an unincorporated community located in the southern portion of the township at 42°33′54″N 82°50′21″W. The community was settled around 1900 by Pittsburgh capitalists who anticipated creating a coastal city east of Mount Clemens along L'Anse Creuse Bay (French for "Little Bay"). The community never really developed on its own and merely succeeded due to its proximity to Mount Clemens.
- Liverpool is a former community located within the township along L'Anse Creuse Bay. It began in 1856 when Edward Shook platted the village with the hopes of making it similar to Liverpool, England. He built a hotel and a dock along the lake, but the project failed.
- Saint Clair Haven is an unincorporated community located along the shores of Lake St. Clair at 42°35′00″N 82°47′25″W.

== Major highways ==
- I-94 runs south–north along the western edge of the township.
- M-59 enters briefly in the northwest corner of the township before having its eastern terminus at I-94.

== Demographics ==
As of the census of 2000, there were 24,461 people, 10,720 households, and 6,421 families residing in the township. The population density was 1,710.2 inhabitants per square mile (660.3/km^{2}). There were 11,486 housing units at an average density of 803.0 per square mile (310.0/km^{2}). The racial makeup of the township was 94.53% White, 2.47% African American, 0.38% Native American, 0.58% Asian, 0.04% Pacific Islander, 0.45% from other races, and 1.55% from two or more races. Hispanic or Latino residents of any race were 1.48% of the population.

There were 10,720 households, out of which 26.9% had children under the age of 18 living with them, 47.5% were married couples living together, 8.1% had a female householder with no husband present, and 40.1% were non-families. 33.1% of all households were made up of individuals, and 8.2% had someone living alone who was 65 years of age or older. The average household size was 2.28 and the average family size was 2.94.

In the township, 21.9% of the population was under the age of 18, 8.7% was from 18 to 24, 32.5% from 25 to 44, 26.0% from 45 to 64, and 10.9% was 65 years of age or older. The median age was 38 years. For every 100 females, there were 101.2 males. For every 100 females age 18 and over, there were 100.7 males.

The median income for a household in the township was $51,892, and the median income for a family was $67,129. Males had a median income of $47,444 versus $31,561 for females. The per capita income for the township was $29,491. About 3.6% of families and 5.7% of the population were below the poverty line, including 7.0% of those under age 18 and 5.9% of those age 65 or over.

== Education ==
The entire township is served by L'Anse Creuse Public Schools, which is headquartered in Clinton Township to the west.

== Notable people ==
- Dino Ciccarelli, retired professional ice hockey player
- Uncle Kracker, singer and musician
- David Legwand, retired professional ice hockey player
- Candice Miller, county and state politician
- Angela Ruggiero, retired professional ice hockey player and Olympian
