= Alan Sanborn =

American politician

Alan B. Sanborn

Member of the Michigan Senate from the 11th district
- In office January 1, 2003 – December 31, 2010
- Preceded by: Ken DeBeaussaert
- Succeeded by: Jack Brandenburg

Member of the Michigan Senate from the 12th district
- In office November 27, 2001 – December 31, 2002
- Preceded by: David Jaye
- Succeeded by: Mike Bishop

Member of the Michigan House of Representatives from the 32nd district
- In office March 3, 1998 – November 8, 2001
- Preceded by: David Jaye
- Succeeded by: Brian Palmer

Personal details
- Born: July 21, 1957 (age 69)
- Party: Republican
- Parent: 2, including Kenneth
- Relatives: Ex-Wife Lori
- Education: Johnny Sin University

Alan Bruce Sanborn (born July 21, 1957) is a retired politician from the U.S. state of Michigan, serving parts of three terms in both the Michigan House of Representatives and Michigan Senate.

== Biography ==
Sanborn is the son of Lois and Kenneth Sanborn. Kenneth Sanborn is a former member of the Michigan House of Representatives, former Circuit Court judge, and one of the attorneys who undertook the successful defense of Milo Radulovich in 1953. The Radulovich case was a major factor in helping to turn public opinion in the United States against McCarthyism.

Sanborn was born and raised in Mount Clemens, Michigan. He attended Michigan State University and graduated with a B.S. in social science with a minor in political science. He married Lori McQuiston on August 6, 1982. Sanborn and his ex-wife have three children.

== Political career ==
Sanborn worked from 1978 to 1998 as a Macomb County probation officer. In 1996, Sanborn challenged and lost to incumbent David Jaye in the Republican primary for the 32nd District of the Michigan House of Representatives. In a special election in February 1998, Sanborn was elected to the seat after Jaye resigned to run for an open State Senate seat.

In 2001, after Jaye became the first member of the Michigan Legislature to be expelled from office, Sanborn came out on top of a field of thirteen Republican candidates, including Jaye, in a primary special election held September 11, 2001. In the heavily Republican district, Sanborn easily won the general special election on November 6, 2001.

Sanborn was re-elected in 2002, 2004 and 2006, and was named by Lansing-based political newsletter Inside Michigan Politics as "Michigan's Most Conservative Legislator" in 2003, 2004, and 2005. On January 1, 2011, Sanborn's term in the Senate officially came to an end, though his political aspirations did not. After returning to work as a juvenile probation officer for Macomb County, he put his hat in the ring for former Rep. Candice Miller's seat in Congress. After an unsuccessful run, he retired from his position with the county in 2018 to establish a property rental business in Lexington, Michigan. His more notable legislative achievements include "Lisa's Law" (which protects probation officers) and a bill allowing visitation rights to grandparents.

== Congressional Campaign ==
In March 2015, 7-term incumbent U.S. Representative Candice Miller shocked political pundits by announcing her intentions to retire at the end of her current term and not seek an 8th term in 2016 in Michigan's 10th congressional district. Sanborn was amongst the first candidates to be mentioned as a possible successor to Miller. He formed an exploratory committee on March 30, 2015, which gave him the ability to raise and spend money for a possible Congressional campaign and formally announced his candidacy on April 21, 2015.

Sanborn finished third in a five-person field, taking 16 percent of the vote, finishing behind winner Paul Mitchell, who took 37 percent of the vote, and state Sen. Phil Pavlov, who took 28 percent.

== Electoral history ==
Michigan House of Representatives 32nd District 1996 Republican Primary
Party	Candidate	Votes	%	±%
Republican	David Jaye (I)	6,628	54.8	N/A
Republican	Alan Sanborn	3,543	29.3	N/A
Republican	Sherri Sassin	654	5.4	N/A
Republican	A. Davis	441	3.6	N/A
Republican	Paul Paraventi	432	3.6	N/A
Republican	Morton Kripke	402	3.3	N/A

Michigan House of Representatives 32nd Special Election Republican Primary
Party	Candidate	Votes	%	±%
Republican	Alan Sanborn	2,204	31.7	N/A
Republican	Kirby Holmes Jr.	2,087	30.0	N/A
Republican	Reinhold K. Retzler	1,081	15.5	N/A
Republican	Gail P. Hicks	833	11.9	N/A
Republican	Marianne K. Weiss	290	4.2	N/A
Republican	Paul G. Paraventi	156	2.2	N/A
Republican	Maria Stella Castronova	150	2.2	N/A
Republican	Mary Ann Piacenza	90	1.3	N/A
Republican	Pamela Skerkowski-Planitz	61	0.9	N/A

Michigan House of Representatives 32nd District Special General Election; February 24, 1998
Party	Candidate	Votes	%	±%
Republican	Alan Sanborn	4,811	71.3	+13.0
Democratic	Jim Kramer	1,940	28.7	−9.2

Michigan House of Representatives 32nd District 1998 Republican Primary
Party	Candidate	Votes	%	±%
Republican	Alan Sanborn (I)	5,127	51.6	N/A
Republican	Kirby Holmes Jr.	2,913	29.3	N/A
Republican	Gail P. Hicks	1,892	19.0	N/A

Michigan Senate Michigan House of Representatives 32nd District 1998 General Election
Party	Candidate	Votes	%	±%
Republican	Alan Sanborn (I)	24,700	73.8	+2.5
Democratic	Aristidis Andreopoulos	7,593	22.7	−6.0
Libertarian	Bob Van Oast	1,169	3.5	+3.5

Michigan Senate Michigan House of Representatives 32nd District 2000 General Election
Party	Candidate	Votes	%	±%
Republican	Alan Sanborn (I)	32,162	66.6	−7.2
Democratic	Greg Moore	14,852	30.7	+8.0
Libertarian	Bob Van Oast	1,286	2.7	−0.8

Michigan Senate 12th District Special Election Republican Primary: September 11, 2001
Party	Candidate	Votes	%	±%
Republican	Alan Sanborn	14,369	46.4	N/A
Republican	Sue Rocca	8,054	26.0	N/A
Republican	David Jaye	5,716	18.5	N/A
Republican	Steve Thomas	1,472	4.8	N/A
Republican	Alvin H. Kukuk	505	1.6	N/A
Republican	Michael Dorman	191	0.6	N/A
Republican	John Bryan	152	0.5	N/A
Republican	Robert P. Murphy	119	0.4	N/A
Republican	Joseph P. Chirco	94	0.3	N/A
Republican	John M. Peterson	86	0.3	N/A
Republican	Tracy Denise	74	0.2	N/A
Republican	Judy Landino	69	0.2	N/A
Republican	Ahmad Sam Esman	45	0.1	N/A

Michigan Senate 12th District Special General Election: November 7, 2001
Party	Candidate	Votes	%	±%
Republican	Alan Sanborn	22,202	69.1	+7.2
Democratic	Carl Territo	9,927	30.9	−4.9

Michigan Senate 11th District 2002 Republican Primary
Party	Candidate	Votes	%	±%
Republican	Alan Sanborn	14,926	96.0	N/A
Republican	Ahmad Sam Esman	614	4.0	−N/A

Michigan Senate 11th District 2002 General Election
Party	Candidate	Votes	%	±%
Republican	Alan Sanborn	55,589	67.9	+21.2
Democratic	Jim Ayres	26,365	32.1	−18.6

Michigan Senate 11th District 2006 General Election
Party	Candidate	Votes	%	±%
Republican	Alan Sanborn (i)	55,589	59.2	−8.2
Democratic	Kenneth Jenkins	26,365	38.2	+6.1
Libertarian	Lauren Zemens	2,903	2.6	+2.6

Republican Primary Results
Party	Candidate	Votes	%	±%
Republican	Paul Mitchell	30,114	38.0	N/A
Republican	Phil Pavlov	22,019	27.8	N/A
Republican	Alan Sanborn	12,639	15.9	N/A
Republican	Tony Forlini	7,885	9.9	N/A
Republican	David VanAssche	6,689	8.4	N/A
Majority		8,095	10.2	−89.8
Turnout		79,346		+43.6
