= N. Lorraine Beebe =

American state senator

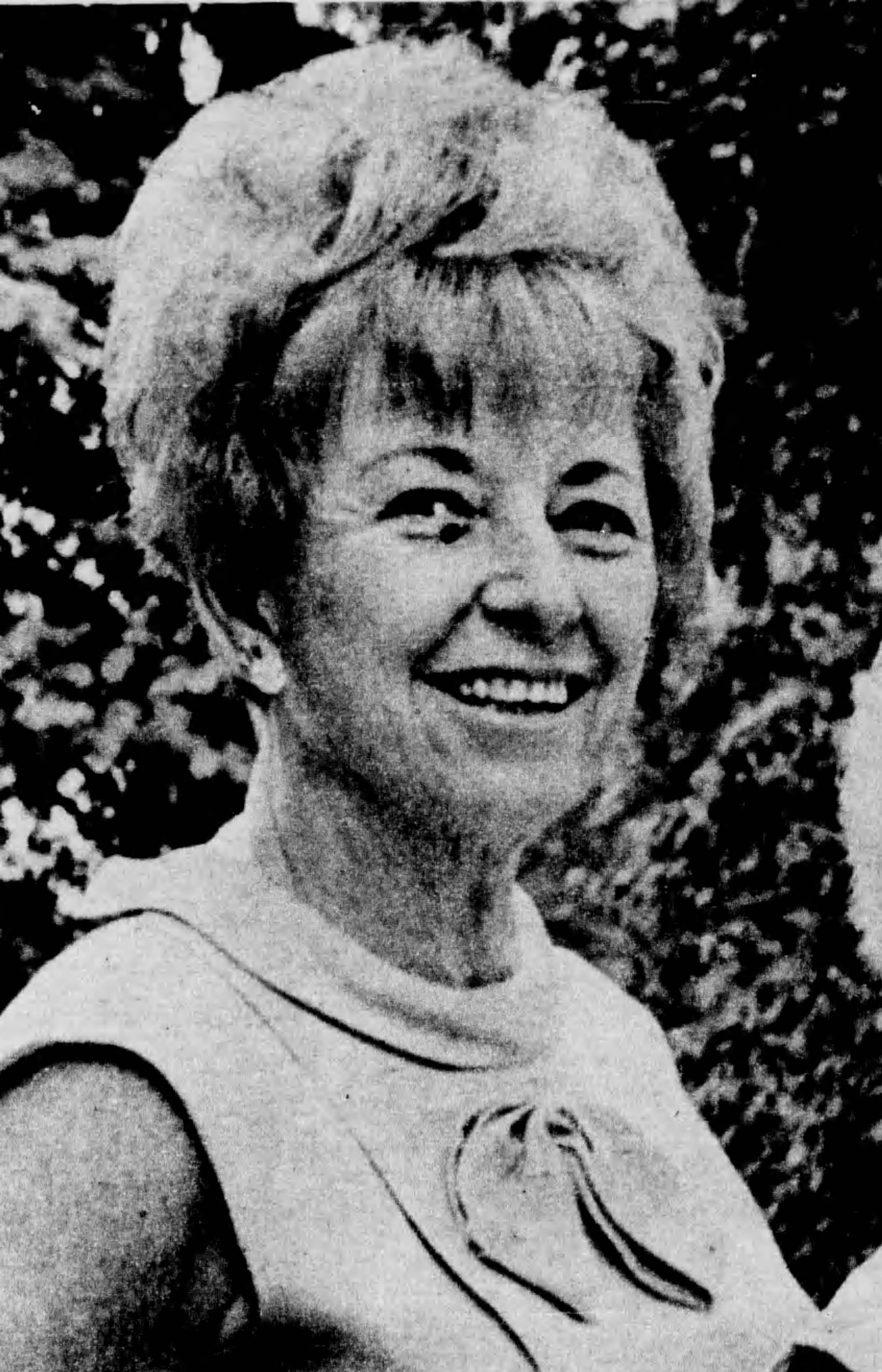
- Beebe in 1969

Member of the Michigan Senate from the 12th district
- In office 1967–1970
- Preceded by: Edward J. Robinson
- Succeeded by: David Plawecki

Personal details
- Born: June 19, 1910 Kalamazoo, Michigan
- Died: August 12, 2005 (aged 95)
- Party: Republican
- Education: Western Michigan University; Wayne State University

N. Lorraine Beebe (née Boekeloo; June 19, 1910 – August 12, 2005) was an American state senator and Michigan state coordinator of the 1980 Anderson for President campaign. She became the third woman in Michigan history to sit on the Michigan Senate after upsetting Democratic nominee Edward J. Robinson for the 12th Senate District seat. However, her advocacy for looser abortion regulations in Michigan caused her to lose her re-election campaign.

== Early life ==
Beebe was born in Kalamazoo on June 19, 1910. She attended Western Michigan University for her Bachelor of Science degree in physical education before moving to the Detroit area and enrolling at Wayne State University for her Master’s in clinical psychology. After graduation, Beebe worked for the city of Kalamazoo for three years as an assistant city recreation director, and eventually moved to Dearborn, Michigan to accept the position of director of girls' and women's recreational activities.

== Career ==
While working as a psychology teacher at Henry Ford College, Beebe upset Democratic nominee Edward J. Robinson for the state senate seat from the 12th Senate District. She was the only woman elected to the Michigan Senate and won with 800 more votes than her male counterpart. She subsequently became the third woman in Michigan history to sit on the Senate and the first from the Republican party. After being elected, Beebe served as chairman of the health, social service and retirement committee, vice chairman of the labor committee and a member of the highway committee.

In 1969, Beebe proposed a bill advocating for looser abortion regulations in Michigan. The bill would have legalized abortion of pregnancies "resulting from rape or incest, or which endangered the mother's health, or which seemed likely to result in the birth of a helplessly deformed child." While encouraging her male colleagues to pass an abortion reform bill, she admitted to undergoing a therapeutic abortion. Although the bill failed, her advocacy drew attention from the media and she was covered nationally overnight. However, her advocacy for looser abortion regulations in Michigan ultimately caused her to lose her re-election campaign.

=== Post-Senate ===
After being defeated, Beebe's family was threatened, her house was fire-bombed, and her tires were slashed. She also said that, despite being voted out, she would continue to advocate for lesser abortion restrictions. In 1972, Beebe was elected executive director of the Michigan Consumers Council over acting director Andrew Eiler Jr. She moved to resign from her position two years later, but the council did not immediately accept her resignation. Part of her resignation was due to pressure from the government and press of the ineffectiveness of the council. In the same year, she began her campaign for Secretary of State as a Republican, which she made without consulting the governor or members of the party.

Beebe died on August 17, 2005, and her cremated remains were interred at St. Barnabas Episcopal Church in Portage.

Party political offices
Preceded by Emil Lockwood	Republican nominee for Michigan Secretary of State; 1974	Succeeded by Melvin L. Larsen
