= Michigan's 12th Senate district =

American legislative district

Michigan's 12th State Senate district
Senator
| Kevin Hertel; D–St. Clair Shores |
- Demographics: 79.3% White; 11.2% Black; 3.2% Hispanic; 1.3% Asian; 0.1% Native American; 0.3% Other; 4.7% Multiracial
- Population (2024): 256,306

Michigan's 12th Senate district is one of 38 districts in the Michigan Senate. The 12th district was created by the 1850 Michigan Constitution, as the 1835 constitution only permitted a maximum of eight senate districts. It has been represented by Democrat Kevin Hertel since 2023, succeeding fellow Democrat Rosemary Bayer.

== Geography ==
District 12 encompasses parts of Macomb, St. Clair, and Wayne counties.

=== 2011 Apportionment Plan ===
District 12, as dictated by the 2011 Apportionment Plan, covered much of central Oakland County in the northern suburbs of Detroit, including Pontiac, Southfield Township, Bloomfield Township, Auburn Hills, Keego Harbor, Orion Township, Oakland Township, Addison Township, Oxford Township, and Independence Township.

The district overlapped with Michigan's 8th, 9th, 11th, and 14th congressional districts, and with the 29th, 35th, 40th, 43rd, 45th, and 46th districts of the Michigan House of Representatives.

== List of senators ==
| Senator | Party | Dates | Residence | Notes |
|---|---|---|---|---|
| Moses A. McNaughton | Free Soil | 1853–1854 | Jackson | |
| Austin Blair | Republican | 1855–1856 | Jackson | |
| Joseph E. Beebe | Republican | 1857–1858 | Jackson | |
| Ira C. Backus | Republican | 1859–1860 | Jackson | |
| Charles V. DeLand | Republican | 1861–1862 | Jackson | |
| Townsend E. Gidley | Democratic | 1863–1864 | Parma | Elected on a Fusionist ticket. |
| Richard J. Crego | Republican | 1865–1866 | Brooklyn | |
| George A. Smith | Republican | 1867–1868 | Somerset | |
| Ezra L. Koon | Republican | 1869–1870 | Hillsdale | |
| William R. Stoddard | Republican | 1871–1872 | Litchfield | |
| Levi Sparks | Republican | 1873–1874 | Buchanan | |
| Francis H. Berrick | Democratic | 1875–1876 | Buchanan | |
| William O. Packard | Republican | 1877–1878 | Covert | |
| James M. Shepard | Republican | 1879–1880 | Cassopolis | |
| Henry Ford | Republican | 1881–1882 | Lawton | |
| Charles J. Monroe | Republican | 1883–1886 | South Haven | |
| John Holbrook | Republican | 1887–1890 | Lansing | |
| Marcus Wilcox | Democratic | 1891–1892 | Corunna | Endorsed by both the Democrats and the Patrons of Industry. (Note: The Patrons of Industry were a farming organization founded in Port Huron, Michigan which, by 1890, had begun participating in political action independent of other political parties at the state level.) |
| Harvey Mellen | Democratic | 1893–1894 | Romeo | |
| Fred M. Warner | Republican | 1895–1898 | Farmington | |
| George B. Davis | Republican | 1899–1900 | Utica | |
| Jerome W. Nims | Republican | 1901–1902 | Romeo | |
| I. Roy Waterbury | Republican | 1903–1904 | Highland Station | |
| Thaddeus D. Seeley | Republican | 1905–1908 | Pontiac | |
| Frank T. Newton | Republican | 1909–1912 | Ypsilanti | |
| James E. McGregor | Democratic | 1913–1914 | Pontiac | |
| Frank L. Covert | Republican | 1915–1918 | Pontiac | |
| George W. Millen | Republican | 1919–1920 | Ann Arbor | |
| Charles A. Sink | Republican | 1921–1922 | Ann Arbor | |
| Andrew B. Glaspie | Republican | 1923–1924 | Oxford | |
| Elijah B. Howarth Jr. | Republican | 1925–1926 | Royal Oak | |
| Charles A. Sink | Republican | 1927–1930 | Ann Arbor | |
| James E. Lawson | Republican | 1931–1932 | Royal Oak | |
| Andrew L. Moore | Republican | 1933–1935 | Pontiac | Died in office. |
| George P. McCallum | Republican | 1937–1944 | Ann Arbor | |
| George N. Higgins | Republican | 1945–1946 | Ferndale | |
| Edgar F. Down | Republican | 1947–1948 | Pleasant Ridge | |
| George N. Higgins | Republican | 1949–1954 | Ferndale | |
| William Broomfield | Republican | 1955–1956 | Royal Oak | |
| L. Harvey Lodge | Republican | 1957–1960 | Waterford Township | |
| Farrell E. Roberts | Republican | 1961–1964 | Pontiac | |
| Edward J. Robinson | Democratic | 1965–1966 | Dearborn | |
| N. Lorraine Beebe | Republican | 1967–1970 | Dearborn | |
| David Plawecki | Democratic | 1971–1982 | Dearborn Heights | |
| William Faust | Democratic | 1983–1994 | Westland | |
| Doug Carl | Republican | 1995–1997 | Mount Clemens | Died in office. |
| David Jaye | Republican | 1997–2001 | Utica | Expelled. |
| Alan Sanborn | Republican | 2001–2002 | Richmond | |
| Mike Bishop | Republican | 2003–2010 | Rochester | |
| Jim Marleau | Republican | 2011–2018 | Lake Orion | |
| Rosemary Bayer | Democratic | 2019–2022 | Beverly Hills | |
| Kevin Hertel | Democratic | 2023–present | St. Clair Shores | |

== Recent election results ==
=== 2020s ===
2026 Michigan Senate election
Primary election
| Party | Candidate | Votes | % |
|---|---|---|---|
| Democratic | Kevin Hertel (incumbent) | 35,910 | 100 |
| Total votes | | 35,910 | 100 |
| Republican | John Goldwater | 11,613 | 47.01 |
| Republican | Shelley Wright | 4,958 | 20.07 |
| Republican | Joseph A. Backus | 4,199 | 17 |
| Republican | Eileen Tesch | 2,763 | 11.19 |
| Republican | Patrick Shawn Biange | 1,169 | 4.73 |
| Total votes | | 24,702 | 100 |
General election
| Democratic | Kevin Hertel (incumbent) | 70,513 | 53.45 |
| Republican | John Goldwater | 61,404 | 46.55 |
| Total votes | | 131,917 | 100 |
| Democratic hold | | | |

2022 Michigan Senate election, District 12
Primary election
| Party | Candidate | Votes | % |
|---|---|---|---|
| Republican | Pamela Hornberger | 19,198 | 64.5 |
| Republican | Michael D. Williams | 10,547 | 35.5 |
| Total votes | | 29,745 | 100 |
General election
| Democratic | Kevin Hertel | 62,772 | 50.2 |
| Republican | Pamela Hornberger | 62,368 | 49.8 |
| Total votes | | 125,140 | 100 |
| Democratic hold | | | |

=== 2018 ===
2018 Michigan Senate election, District 12
Primary election
| Party | Candidate | Votes | % |
|---|---|---|---|
| Republican | Michael McCready | 12,524 | 45.4 |
| Republican | Jim Tedder | 12,239 | 44.3 |
| Republican | Terry Whitney | 2,073 | 7.5 |
| Republican | Vernon Molnar | 770 | 2.8 |
| Total votes | | 27,606 | 100 |
General election
| Democratic | Rosemary Bayer | 59,302 | 49.4 |
| Republican | Michael McCready | 58,363 | 48.6 |
| Libertarian | Jeff Pittel | 2,404 | 2.0 |
| Total votes | | 120,071 | 100 |
| Democratic gain from Republican | | | |

=== 2014 ===
2014 Michigan Senate election, District 12
Primary election
| Party | Candidate | Votes | % |
|---|---|---|---|
| Republican | Jim Marleau (incumbent) | 14,617 | 71.3 |
| Republican | Bob Gray | 5,873 | 28.7 |
| Total votes | | 20,490 | 100 |
| Democratic | Paul Secrest | 7,649 | 68.4 |
| Democratic | Kenneth VanNorwick | 3,540 | 31.6 |
| Total votes | | 11,189 | 100 |
General election
| Republican | Jim Marleau (incumbent) | 50,117 | 57.5 |
| Democratic | Paul Secrest | 37,067 | 42.5 |
| Total votes | | 87,184 | 100 |
| Republican hold | | | |

=== Federal and statewide results ===
| Year | Office | Results |
|---|---|---|
| 2020 | President | Biden 52.2 – 46.3% |
| 2018 | Senate | Stabenow 50.6 – 48.0% |
| 2018 | Governor | Whitmer 52.0 – 45.7% |
| 2016 | President | Trump 47.9 – 47.4% |
| 2014 | Senate | Peters 50.1 – 46.5% |
| 2014 | Governor | Snyder 60.5 – 37.9% |
| 2012 | President | Romney 49.9 – 49.4% |
| 2012 | Senate | Stabenow 52.7 – 44.2% |

== Historical district boundaries ==
| Map | Description | Apportionment Plan | Notes |
|---|---|---|---|
| | Wayne County (part); Dearborn (part); Dearborn Heights (part); Inkster (part); Redford Township | 1964 Apportionment Plan | |
| | Wayne County (part); Allen Park (part); Dearborn Heights; Inkster; Southgate; Taylor (part) | 1972 Apportionment Plan | |
| | Wayne County (part); Belleville; Flat Rock; Huron Township; Romulus; Sumpter Township; Taylor; Van Buren Township; Wayne; Westland | 1982 Apportionment Plan | |
| | Macomb County (part); Armada Township; Bruce Township; Fraser; Macomb Township; Memphis; Ray Township; Richmond Township; Shelby Township; Sterling Heights; Utica; Washington Township | 1992 Apportionment Plan | |
| | Oakland County (part); Addison Township; Auburn Hills; Clarkston; Independence Township; Keego Harbor; Lake Angelus; Oakland Township; Orion Township; Oxford Township; Pontiac; Rochester; Rochester Hills; Sylvan Lake; West Bloomfield Township (part) | 2001 Apportionment Plan | |
| | Oakland County (part); Addison Township; Auburn Hills; Bloomfield Township; Clarkston; Independence Township; Keego Harbor; Oakland Township; Orion Township; Oxford Township; Pontiac; Southfield Township; Sylvan Lake | 2011 Apportionment Plan | |
