= Alexander McNaughton =

Founder of Argyle NY and judge (b. 1693, d. 1784)

Alexander McNaughton (1693 - 1784) was the leader of a Scottish immigrant group that went on to found Argyle, NY. He was also the first Justice of the Peace in the region and in this position, handled the case and issued a warrant for Ethan Allen.

== Biography ==
McNaughton was born on Islay, Argyllshire, Scotland and died in Salem, NY. He married Mary MacDonald, the daughter of Sir Donald MacDonald, 3rd Baronet of Sleat (son of Sir James Mor Macdonald, 2nd Baronet) and Lady Mary Douglas (daughter of Sir Robert Douglas, tenth Earl of Morton). McNaughton’s wife was a descendant of John MacDonald, Lord of the Isles and Margaret Stewart (daughter of Robert II King of Scotland).

McNaughton emigrated with his family first to New York City on September 22, 1738 and shortly thereafter, moved to Orange County, NY.

He was amongst over 100 other immigrants from Scotland that were promised a large amount of land that was not initially provided to the immigrants. McNaughton successfully led the effort on March 2, 1764 to petition for 47,450 acres and became presiding trustee of the Argyle Patent. The land includes part of Fort Edward and Argyle.

The settlers formed the town of Argyle, NY, where McNaughton became the region's first Justice of the Peace. After riots broke out in the region on October 29, 1771, McNaughton issued warrants for those involved, including Ethan Allen.

Alexander is also the great grandfather of Moses Archibald McNaughton, a founding member of the Republican Party and Michigan pioneer.
