= Henry Ford (Michigan legislator) =

American politician (1825–1894)

Member of the Michigan Senate from the 12th district
- In office January 1, 1881 – December 31, 1882
- Preceded by: James M. Shepard
- Succeeded by: Charles Jay Monroe

Personal details
- Born: February 11, 1825 Monroe, New York
- Died: June 20, 1894 (aged 69)
- Party: Republican

Henry Ford (February 11, 1825 – June 20, 1894) was a Michigan politician.

== Early life ==
Ford was born on February 11, 1825, in Monroe, New York.

== Career ==
Ford moved to Michigan in 1867 to oversee the erection of the Lawton Iron Works. From 1868 to 1869, Ford served as village president of Lawton, Michigan. He served as village president again in 1879. On November 2, 1880, Ford was elected to the Michigan Senate where he represented the 12th district from January 1, 1881, to December 31, 1882. Ford had also served as justice of the peace.

== Personal life ==
At some point in his life, Ford married a woman named Catherine. Together they had two children. Ford married Florence A. Smith on January 18, 1882, in Lawton.

== Death ==
Ford died on June 20, 1894, of heart failure.
