= 2024 United States presidential election in Minnesota =

- November 5, 2024
- Turnout: 76.35% (▼3.61 pp)

Nominee	Kamala Harris	Donald Trump
Party	Democratic (DFL)	Republican
Home state	California	Florida
Running mate	Tim Walz	JD Vance
Electoral vote	10	0
Popular vote	1,656,979	1,519,032
Percentage	50.92%	46.68%

Harris
40–50%
50–60%
60–70%
70–80%
80–90%
90–100%
Trump
40–50%
50–60%
60–70%
70–80%
80–90%
90–100%
Tie/No data
President before election
Joe Biden
Democratic (DFL)
Elected President
Donald Trump
Republican

The 2024 United States presidential election in Minnesota took place on Tuesday, November 5, 2024, as part of the 2024 United States elections in which all 50 states plus the District of Columbia participated. Minnesota voters chose electors to represent them in the Electoral College via a popular vote. The state of Minnesota has 10 electoral votes in the Electoral College, following reapportionment due to the 2020 United States census in which the state neither gained nor lost a seat.

Harris selected Minnesota Governor Tim Walz as her running mate. This decision was seen as a strategic effort to bolster support in the Midwest as well as among progressives. Walz's local popularity, progressive stances, and his record of addressing state-level issues were expected to positively influence voter turnout in Minnesota, and potentially secure the state for the Democratic ticket.

Harris won the state by 4.24 points, marking the thirteenth consecutive Democratic presidential win in Minnesota, the longest active such streak of any U.S. state. Prior to the election, all major news organizations considered Minnesota a state Harris would win, or otherwise a lean to likely blue state.

Although Harris won the state, the state still shifted rightward by 3% despite it being Walz's home state. Nearly all counties in the state shifted rightward, with the exceptions of Cook, Lake and Lincoln counties, which recorded minor shifts to the left. This was part of all 50 states and D.C. shifting rightward in this election, also including Harris’ home state of California. By contrast, Trump improved in his running mate's home state of Ohio and massively improved in his home state of Florida.

Republican nominee Donald Trump was able to flip four counties that Joe Biden had won four years prior: Carlton, Blue Earth, Nicollet, and Winona. This was the first presidential election since 1928 in which Carlton County voted Republican.

== Primary elections ==
=== Republican primary ===
The Minnesota Republican primary was held on Super Tuesday, March 5, 2024.

Minnesota Republican primary, March 5, 2024
Candidate	Votes	Percentage	Actual delegate count		
Candidate	Votes	Percentage	Bound	Unbound	Total
Donald Trump	232,846	68.94%	27	0	27
Nikki Haley	97,182	28.77%	12	0	12
Ron DeSantis (withdrawn)	4,085	1.21%	0	0	0
Vivek Ramaswamy (withdrawn)	1,470	0.44%	0	0	0
Chris Christie (withdrawn)	1,431	0.42%	0	0	0
Write-ins	720	0.21%	0	0	0
Total:	337,014	100.00%	39	0	39

=== Democratic primary ===
The Minnesota Democratic primary was held on Super Tuesday, March 5, 2024.

2024 Minnesota Democratic pres. primary
Candidate	Votes	%	Delegates
Joe Biden (incumbent)	171,278	70.12	64
Uncommitted	45,914	18.80	11
Dean Phillips	18,960	7.76	0
Marianne Williamson	3,459	1.42	0
Jason Palmer	758	0.31	0
Cenk Uygur	692	0.28	0
Armando Perez-Serrato	372	0.15	0
Gabriel Cornejo	323	0.13	0
Frankie Lozada	290	0.12	0
Eban Cambridge	235	0.10	0
Write-in votes	2,000	0.82	—
Total	244,281	100%	75

=== Legal Marijuana Now primary ===
The Minnesota Legal Marijuana Now primary was held on Super Tuesday, March 5, 2024.

Minnesota Legal Marijuana Now primary, March 5, 2024
Candidate	Votes	Percentage	Delegates				
Candidate	Votes	Percentage	Delegates	Krystal Gabel (withdrawn)	759	28.84%	–
Dennis Schuller	459	17.44%	7				
Vermin Supreme	397	15.08%	6				
Rudy Reyes	365	13.87%	5				
Edward Forchion	168	6.38%	2				
Willie Nelson (write-in)	19	0.72%	0				
Other write-ins	465	17.67%	–				
Total:	2,632	100.00%	20				

== General election ==
=== Candidates ===
The following presidential candidates received ballot access in Minnesota:

- Kamala Harris, Democratic Party
- Donald Trump, Republican Party
- Chase Oliver, Libertarian Party
- Jill Stein, Green Party
- Claudia De la Cruz, Party for Socialism and Liberation
- Cornel West, Independent
- Shiva Ayyadurai, Independent
- Robert F. Kennedy Jr., Independent (withdrawn)

=== Predictions ===
Source	Ranking	As of
Cook Political Report	Likely D	August 27, 2024
Inside Elections	Lean D	April 26, 2023
Sabato's Crystal Ball	Likely D	August 6, 2024
The Economist	Likely D	August 23, 2024
CNalysis	Solid D	August 6, 2024
CNN	Lean D	August 25, 2024
538	Likely D	August 23, 2024
NBC News	Likely D	October 6, 2024
YouGov	Likely D	October 16, 2024
Split Ticket	Likely D	November 1, 2024

=== Polling ===
Kamala Harris vs. Donald Trump

Aggregate polls

Source of poll aggregation	Dates administered	Dates updated	Kamala Harris Democratic	Donald Trump Republican	Undecided (Note: Calculated by taking the difference of 100% and all other candidates combined.)	Margin
270ToWin	October 16 – November 4, 2024	November 4, 2024	49.8%	43.6%	6.6%	Harris +6.2%
538	through November 4, 2024	November 4, 2024	50.0%	44.2%	5.8%	Harris +5.8%
Silver Bulletin	through November 3, 2024	November 3, 2024	50.4%	43.9%	5.7%	Harris +6.5%
The Hill/DDHQ	through November 3, 2024	November 3, 2024	49.9%	45.5%	4.6%	Harris +4.4%
Average			50.0%	44.3%	5.7%	Harris +5.7%

Poll source	Date(s) administered	Sample size (Note: Key: A – all adults RV – registered voters LV – likely voters V – unclear)	Margin of error	Kamala Harris Democratic	Donald Trump Republican	Other / Undecided
AtlasIntel	November 3–4, 2024	2,065 (LV)	± 2.0%	49%	47%	4%
Research Co.	November 2–3, 2024	450 (LV)	± 4.6%	51%	44%	5%
ActiVote	October 9 – November 1, 2024	400 (LV)	± 4.9%	52%	48%	–
SurveyUSA (Note: Poll sponsored by KSTP-TV, WDIO-TV, & KAAL-TV)	October 24–28, 2024	728 (LV)	± 4.0%	51%	43%	5% (Note: "Other" with 2%)
Rasmussen Reports (R) (Note: Poll sponsored by American Thinker)	October 24–26, 2024	959 (LV)	± 3.0%	50%	47%	3%
CES/YouGov	October 1–25, 2024	1,278 (A)	–	52%	44%	4%
CES/YouGov	October 1–25, 2024	1,275 (LV)	–	53%	43%	4%
Embold Research/MinnPost	October 16–22, 2024	1,734 (LV)	± 2.4%	48%	45%	7% (Note: "Other" with 5%)
ActiVote	September 10 – October 9, 2024	400 (LV)	± 4.9%	53%	47%	–
SurveyUSA	September 23–26, 2024	646 (LV)	± 4.3%	50%	44%	6%
Rasmussen Reports (R)	September 19–22, 2024	993 (LV)	± 3.0%	49%	46%	5%
Mason-Dixon (Note: Poll sponsored by KARE11, Minnesota Public Radio & the Star Tribune)	September 16–18, 2024	800 (LV)	± 3.5%	48%	43%	9%
Morning Consult	September 9–18, 2024	517 (LV)	± 4.0%	50%	43%	7%
Embold Research/MinnPost	September 4–8, 2024	1,616 (LV)	± 2.8%	49%	45%	6% (Note: "Another candidate" with 4%)
Morning Consult	August 30 – September 8, 2024	501 (LV)	± 4.0%	51%	44%	5%
SurveyUSA	August 27–29, 2024	635 (LV)	± 4.5%	48%	43%	9%
	August 23, 2024	Robert F. Kennedy Jr. suspends his presidential campaign and endorses Donald Trump.				
	August 19–22, 2024	Democratic National Convention				
SurveyUSA	July 23–25, 2024	656 (LV)	± 4.4%	50%	40%	10% (Note: "Other" with 4%)
Fox News	July 22–24, 2024	1,071 (RV)	± 3.0%	52%	46%	2%

Kamala Harris vs. Donald Trump vs. Cornel West vs. Jill Stein vs. Chase Oliver

Poll source	Date(s) administered	Sample size	Margin of error	Kamala Harris Democratic	Donald Trump Republican	Cornel West Independent	Jill Stein Green	Chase Oliver Libertarian	Other / Undecided
AtlasIntel	November 3–4, 2024	2,065 (LV)	± 2.0%	49%	47%	–	2%	1%	1% (Note: "Other" with 1%)
Redfield & Wilton Strategies	October 12–14, 2024	544 (LV)	–	51%	43%	–	1%	0%	5%
Redfield & Wilton Strategies	September 27 – October 2, 2024	551 (LV)	–	51%	43%	–	0%	1%	5%
Redfield & Wilton Strategies	September 16–19, 2024	703 (LV)	–	50%	44%	–	1%	0%	5%
Redfield & Wilton Strategies	September 6–9, 2024	617 (LV)	–	51%	44%	–	0%	0%	5%

Kamala Harris vs. Donald Trump vs. Robert F. Kennedy Jr. vs. Cornel West vs. Jill Stein vs. Chase Oliver

Poll source	Date(s) administered	Sample size	Margin of error	Kamala Harris Democratic	Donald Trump Republican	Robert Kennedy Jr Independent	Cornel West Independent	Jill Stein Green	Chase Oliver Libertarian	Other / Undecided
Chism Strategies	October 28–30, 2024	534 (LV)	± 4.2%	48%	43%	1%	–	1%	0%	7% (Note: "Someone else" with 2%)
Redfield & Wilton Strategies	August 12–15, 2024	592 (LV)	–	47%	40%	3%	–	0%	0%	10%
Redfield & Wilton Strategies	July 31 – August 3, 2024	538 (LV)	–	46%	41%	3%	–	0%	0%	10%
Redfield & Wilton Strategies	July 22–24, 2024	475 (LV)	–	44%	41%	6%	–	1%	0%	8%
Fox News	July 22–24, 2024	1,071 (RV)	± 3.0%	47%	41%	7%	1%	1%	–	3%

Hypothetical polling with Joe Biden and Donald Trump

Joe Biden vs. Donald Trump

Poll source	Date(s) administered	Sample size	Margin of error	Joe Biden Democratic	Donald Trump Republican	Other / Undecided
Emerson College	June 13–18, 2024	1,000 (RV)	± 3.0%	45%	45%	10%
Emerson College	June 13–18, 2024	1,000 (RV)	± 3.0%	51% (Note: With voters who lean towards a given candidate)	49%	–
SurveyUSA	June 12–16, 2024	626 (LV)	± 4.3%	47%	41%	12% (Note: "Other" with 6%)
McLaughlin & Associates (R) (Note: Poll sponsored by Trump's campaign)	June 9–11, 2024	600 (LV)	± 4.0%	45%	47%	8%
SurveyUSA	May 8–11, 2024	625 (LV)	± 4.3%	44%	42%	14% (Note: "Other" with 9%)
McLaughlin & Associates (R)	April 29 – May 1, 2024	600 (LV)	± 4.0%	46%	49%	5%
John Zogby Strategies (Note: Poll conducted for Kennedy's campaign)	April 13–21, 2024	417 (LV)	–	46%	44%	10%
SurveyUSA	April 3–7, 2024	608 (LV)	± 4.9%	44%	42%	14% (Note: "Other" with 11%)
SurveyUSA	February 23–28, 2024	1,603 (LV)	± 2.8%	42%	38%	20%
SurveyUSA	January 24–29, 2024	1,594 (LV)	± 2.8%	42%	39%	19%
Big Data Poll (R)	November 18–23, 2023	854 (RV)	± 3.4%	37%	38%	25% (Note: "Another third party candidate" with 12%; "Would not vote" with 3%)
Big Data Poll (R)	November 18–23, 2023	784 (LV)	± 3.4%	39%	39%	22% (Note: "Another third party candidate" with 13%; "Would not vote" with 1%)
Embold Research/MinnPost	November 14–17, 2023	1,519 (LV)	± 2.6%	45%	42%	13%
Emerson College	October 1–4, 2023	477 (LV)	± 4.4%	40%	38%	22%
Public Opinion Strategies (R)	May 6–8, 2023	500 (LV)	–	48%	40%	12%

Joe Biden vs. Donald Trump vs. Robert F. Kennedy Jr. vs. Cornel West vs. Jill Stein

Poll source	Date(s) administered	Sample size	Margin of error	Joe Biden Democratic	Donald Trump Republican	Robert F. Kennedy Jr. Independent	Cornel West Independent	Jill Stein Green	Other / Undecided
Emerson College	June 13–18, 2024	1,000 (RV)	± 3.0%	41%	42%	6%	1%	1%	9%
McLaughlin & Associates (R)	June 9–11, 2024	600 (LV)	± 4.0%	37%	41%	7%	2%	2%	11%
McLaughlin & Associates (R)	April 29 – May 1, 2024	600 (LV)	± 4.0%	40%	40%	9%	1%	1%	9%
Big Data Poll (R)	November 18–23, 2023	854 (RV)	± 3.4%	35%	36%	8%	2%	2%	17% (Note: "Would not vote" with 3%)
Big Data Poll (R)	November 18–23, 2023	784 (LV)	± 3.4%	37%	37%	9%	2%	2%	13%

Joe Biden vs. Donald Trump vs. Robert F. Kennedy Jr.

Poll source	Date(s) administered	Sample size	Margin of error	Joe Biden Democratic	Donald Trump Republican	Robert F. Kennedy Jr. Independent	Other / Undecided
Mason-Dixon	June 3–5, 2024	800 (LV)	± 3.5%	45%	41%	6%	9%
Big Data Poll (R)	November 18–23, 2023	854 (RV)	± 3.4%	35%	35%	9%	21% (Note: "Another third party candidate" with 8%; "Would not vote" with 3%)
Big Data Poll (R)	November 18–23, 2023	784 (LV)	± 3.4%	38%	36%	9%	17%

Hypothetical polling with other candidates

Joe Biden vs. Robert F. Kennedy Jr.

Poll source	Date(s) administered	Sample size	Margin of error	Joe Biden Democratic	Robert F. Kennedy Jr. Independent	Other / Undecided
John Zogby Strategies	April 13–21, 2024	417 (LV)	–	40%	46%	14%

Robert F. Kennedy Jr. vs. Donald Trump

Poll source	Date(s) administered	Sample size	Margin of error	Robert F. Kennedy Jr. Independent	Donald Trump Republican	Other / Undecided
John Zogby Strategies	April 13–21, 2024	417 (LV)	–	47%	36%	17%

Gretchen Whitmer vs. Donald Trump

Poll source	Date(s) administered	Sample size	Margin of error	Gretchen Whitmer Democratic	Donald Trump Republican	Other / Undecided
Fox News	July 22–24, 2024	1,071 (RV)	± 3.0%	49%	46%	5%

Josh Shapiro vs. Donald Trump

Poll source	Date(s) administered	Sample size	Margin of error	Josh Shapiro Democratic	Donald Trump Republican	Other / Undecided
Fox News	July 22–24, 2024	1,071 (RV)	± 3.0%	49%	45%	6%

Joe Biden vs. Ron DeSantis

Poll source	Date(s) administered	Sample size	Margin of error	Joe Biden Democratic	Ron DeSantis Republican	Other / Undecided
Public Opinion Strategies (R)	May 6–8, 2023	500 (LV)	–	45%	43%	12%

=== Results ===
State House district results: Trump 40–50% 50–60% 60–70% 70–80% / Harris 40–50% 50–60% 60–70% 70–80% 80–90%

2024 United States presidential election in Minnesota
Party	Candidate	Votes	%	±%
Democratic (DFL)	Kamala Harris; Tim Walz	1,656,979	50.92	−1.48%
Republican	Donald Trump; JD Vance	1,519,032	46.68	+1.40%
We the People	Robert F. Kennedy Jr.; Nicole Shanahan	24,001	0.74	N/A
Green	Jill Stein; Samson Kpadenou (Note: Placeholder for Butch Ware, Stein's vice presidential nominee.)	16,275	0.50	+0.19%
Libertarian	Chase Oliver; Mike ter Maat	15,155	0.47	−0.60%
Justice For All	Cornel West; Melina Abdullah	3,136	0.10	N/A
Socialism and Liberation	Claudia De la Cruz; Karina Garcia	2,996	0.09	+0.05%
Independent	Shiva Ayyadurai; Crystal Ellis	2,885	0.09	N/A
Socialist Workers	Rachele Fruit; Dennis Richter	457	0.01	−0.01%
Write-in		13,004	0.40	+0.10%
Total votes		3,253,920	100.00	N/A

Results by precinct in Minneapolis Harris: 70–80%; 80–90%; 90–100%

==== By county ====
County	Kamala Harris DFL		Donald Trump Republican		Various candidates Other parties		Margin		Total
County	#	%	#	%	#	%	#	%	Total
Aitkin	3,524	33.74%	6,741	64.53%	181	1.73%	-3,217	-30.80%	10,446
Anoka	97,667	46.40%	106,974	50.82%	5,840	2.77%	-9,307	-4.42%	210,481
Becker	6,435	32.60%	12,961	65.66%	343	1.74%	-6,526	-33.06%	19,739
Beltrami	11,493	46.20%	12,898	51.85%	483	1.94%	-1,405	-5.65%	24,874
Benton	7,084	31.04%	15,260	66.86%	480	2.10%	-8,176	-35.82%	22,824
Big Stone	964	34.14%	1,796	63.60%	64	2.27%	-832	-29.46%	2,824
Blue Earth	17,558	48.18%	18,001	49.40%	883	2.42%	-443	-1.22%	36,442
Brown	4,576	31.35%	9,692	66.39%	330	2.26%	-5,116	-35.05%	14,598
Carlton	9,905	47.59%	10,435	50.13%	475	2.28%	-530	-2.55%	20,815
Carver	31,869	46.08%	35,586	51.45%	1,705	2.47%	-3,717	-5.37%	69,160
Cass	6,300	32.54%	12,759	65.89%	304	1.57%	-6,459	-33.36%	19,363
Chippewa	2,026	32.07%	4,175	66.08%	117	1.85%	-2,149	-34.01%	6,318
Chisago	11,894	33.41%	23,047	64.74%	660	1.85%	-11,153	-31.33%	35,601
Clay	16,121	49.04%	15,965	48.56%	788	2.40%	156	0.47%	32,874
Clearwater	1,169	24.28%	3,575	74.26%	70	1.45%	-2,406	-49.98%	4,814
Cook	2,416	66.01%	1,142	31.20%	102	2.79%	1,274	34.81%	3,660
Cottonwood	1,705	28.47%	4,157	69.42%	126	2.10%	-2,452	-40.95%	5,988
Crow Wing	14,173	33.45%	27,423	64.73%	770	1.82%	-13,250	-31.28%	42,366
Dakota	143,267	55.14%	109,995	42.34%	6,543	2.52%	33,272	12.81%	259,805
Dodge	4,108	32.91%	8,095	64.84%	281	2.25%	-3,987	-31.94%	12,484
Douglas	7,938	31.62%	16,726	66.62%	442	1.76%	-8,788	-35.00%	25,106
Faribault	2,352	30.31%	5,247	67.61%	162	2.09%	-2,895	-37.30%	7,761
Fillmore	4,491	36.26%	7,638	61.67%	256	2.07%	-3,147	-25.41%	12,385
Freeborn	6,448	38.60%	10,003	59.88%	253	1.51%	-3,555	-21.28%	16,704
Goodhue	11,731	40.71%	16,461	57.12%	625	2.17%	-4,730	-16.41%	28,817
Grant	1,187	33.50%	2,266	63.96%	90	2.54%	-1,079	-30.45%	3,543
Hennepin	502,710	69.80%	197,244	27.39%	20,219	2.81%	305,466	42.42%	720,173
Houston	4,667	40.84%	6,547	57.29%	214	1.87%	-1,880	-16.45%	11,428
Hubbard	4,536	33.31%	8,809	64.69%	272	2.00%	-4,273	-31.38%	13,617
Isanti	7,384	28.49%	18,027	69.55%	507	1.96%	-10,643	-41.06%	25,918
Itasca	10,467	39.00%	15,863	59.10%	510	1.90%	-5,396	-20.10%	26,840
Jackson	1,581	28.01%	3,949	69.97%	114	2.02%	-2,368	-41.96%	5,644
Kanabec	2,718	28.01%	6,818	70.27%	167	1.72%	-4,100	-42.25%	9,703
Kandiyohi	7,814	33.56%	15,014	64.48%	455	1.95%	-7,200	-30.92%	23,283
Kittson	911	36.44%	1,535	61.40%	54	2.16%	-624	-24.96%	2,500
Koochiching	2,465	36.31%	4,204	61.92%	120	1.77%	-1,739	-25.61%	6,789
Lac qui Parle	1,314	32.88%	2,600	65.07%	82	2.05%	-1,286	-32.18%	3,996
Lake	3,534	50.82%	3,265	46.95%	155	2.23%	269	3.87%	6,954
Lake of the Woods	604	25.73%	1,710	72.86%	33	1.41%	-1,106	-47.12%	2,347
Le Sueur	5,636	32.26%	11,503	65.85%	330	1.89%	-5,867	-33.59%	17,469
Lincoln	972	30.05%	2,190	67.70%	73	2.26%	-1,218	-37.65%	3,235
Lyon	4,284	32.98%	8,400	64.67%	306	2.36%	-4,116	-31.69%	12,990
Mahnomen	975	44.66%	1,165	53.37%	43	1.97%	-190	-8.70%	2,183
Marshall	1,177	23.39%	3,774	75.01%	80	1.59%	-2,597	-51.62%	5,031
Martin	3,171	29.37%	7,442	68.93%	183	1.70%	-4,271	-39.56%	10,796
McLeod	6,374	30.07%	14,394	67.90%	431	2.03%	-8,020	-37.83%	21,199
Meeker	3,802	27.76%	9,645	70.43%	247	1.80%	-5,843	-42.67%	13,694
Mille Lacs	4,374	28.80%	10,570	69.59%	246	1.62%	-6,196	-40.79%	15,190
Morrison	4,306	21.20%	15,666	77.12%	341	1.68%	-11,360	-55.92%	20,313
Mower	8,312	43.82%	10,297	54.28%	360	1.90%	-1,985	-10.46%	18,969
Murray	1,329	27.87%	3,346	70.16%	94	1.97%	-2,017	-42.29%	4,769
Nicollet	9,441	48.62%	9,540	49.13%	436	2.25%	-99	-0.51%	19,417
Nobles	2,599	31.41%	5,541	66.96%	135	1.63%	-2,942	-35.55%	8,275
Norman	1,233	37.43%	1,963	59.59%	98	2.98%	-730	-22.16%	3,294
Olmsted	49,121	54.02%	39,467	43.41%	2,336	2.57%	9,654	10.62%	90,924
Otter Tail	11,752	31.99%	24,276	66.08%	708	1.93%	-12,524	-34.09%	36,736
Pennington	2,439	33.04%	4,756	64.44%	186	2.52%	-2,317	-31.39%	7,381
Pine	5,339	31.57%	11,274	66.67%	298	1.76%	-5,935	-35.10%	16,911
Pipestone	1,215	25.12%	3,537	73.12%	85	1.76%	-2,322	-48.00%	4,837
Polk	4,967	32.21%	10,162	65.91%	290	1.88%	-5,195	-33.69%	15,419
Pope	2,398	33.22%	4,677	64.80%	143	1.98%	-2,279	-31.57%	7,218
Ramsey	195,168	70.20%	75,284	27.08%	7,573	2.72%	119,884	43.12%	278,025
Red Lake	642	30.34%	1,425	67.34%	49	2.32%	-783	-37.00%	2,116
Redwood	2,300	27.62%	5,895	70.80%	131	1.57%	-3,595	-43.18%	8,326
Renville	2,280	28.29%	5,610	69.62%	168	2.08%	-3,330	-41.33%	8,058
Rice	17,353	47.66%	18,264	50.16%	795	2.18%	-911	-2.50%	36,412
Rock	1,585	29.50%	3,690	68.68%	98	1.82%	-2,105	-39.18%	5,373
Roseau	2,093	24.63%	6,279	73.88%	127	1.49%	-4,186	-49.25%	8,499
St. Louis	66,335	55.74%	50,065	42.07%	2,609	2.19%	16,270	13.67%	119,009
Scott	40,214	44.61%	47,837	53.07%	2,090	2.32%	-7,623	-8.46%	90,141
Sherburne	18,329	31.62%	38,491	66.41%	1,140	1.97%	-20,162	-34.79%	57,960
Sibley	2,351	27.54%	6,014	70.45%	172	2.01%	-3,663	-42.91%	8,537
Stearns	30,829	35.59%	53,932	62.25%	1,871	2.16%	-23,103	-26.67%	86,632
Steele	7,650	36.65%	12,742	61.05%	480	2.30%	-5,092	-24.40%	20,872
Stevens	1,827	35.55%	3,213	62.52%	99	1.93%	-1,386	-26.97%	5,139
Swift	1,618	32.01%	3,340	66.09%	96	1.90%	-1,722	-34.07%	5,054
Todd	3,072	22.39%	10,392	75.75%	254	1.85%	-7,320	-53.36%	13,718
Traverse	597	33.13%	1,165	64.65%	40	2.22%	-568	-31.52%	1,802
Wabasha	4,721	34.95%	8,523	63.09%	265	1.96%	-3,802	-28.14%	13,509
Wadena	1,898	23.59%	6,028	74.91%	121	1.50%	-4,130	-51.32%	8,047
Waseca	3,402	32.75%	6,770	65.18%	215	2.07%	-3,368	-32.43%	10,387
Washington	90,324	53.28%	75,271	44.40%	3,941	2.32%	15,053	8.88%	169,536
Watonwan	1,723	34.93%	3,087	62.58%	123	2.49%	-1,364	-27.65%	4,933
Wilkin	986	29.41%	2,290	68.30%	77	2.30%	-1,304	-38.89%	3,353
Winona	12,929	46.51%	14,288	51.40%	580	2.09%	-1,359	-4.89%	27,797
Wright	30,883	34.30%	57,211	63.54%	1,947	2.16%	-26,328	-29.24%	90,041
Yellow Medicine	1,548	28.61%	3,738	69.09%	124	2.29%	-2,190	-40.48%	5,410
Totals	1,656,979	50.92%	1,519,032	46.68%	77,909	2.39%	137,947	4.24%	3,253,920

==== Counties that flipped from Democratic to Republican ====
- Blue Earth (largest municipality: Mankato)
- Carlton (largest municipality: Cloquet)
- Nicollet (largest municipality: North Mankato)
- Winona (largest municipality: Winona)

==== By congressional district ====
Harris and Trump each won four of eight congressional districts.

District	Harris	Trump	Representative
1st	42.92%	54.88%	Brad Finstad
2nd	51.69%	45.89%	Angie Craig
3rd	59.26%	38.11%	Dean Phillips (118th Congress)
3rd	59.26%	38.11%	Kelly Morrison (119th Congress)
4th	66.43%	30.93%	Betty McCollum
5th	79.26%	17.67%	Ilhan Omar
6th	39.03%	58.62%	Tom Emmer
7th	30.84%	67.21%	Michelle Fischbach
8th	41.90%	56.14%	Pete Stauber

== Analysis ==
An upper Midwestern state at the western end of the Great Lakes, Minnesota is seen as a moderately blue state. It has the longest active streak of voting for Democratic presidential nominees of any U.S. state; the last Republican to win Minnesota was Richard Nixon in 1972, against the backdrop of his 49-state landslide reelection; and it was also the only state to not back Ronald Reagan in 1984, with favorite son Walter Mondale victorious in his home state by a slim margin. However, presidential elections in Minnesota have consistently been competitive in the 21st century, with no Democrat carrying the state by double digits with the exception of Midwesterner Barack Obama, who did so by 10.2 percentage points in 2008. Minnesota was considered to be a Democratic-leaning state in this election; in the weeks leading up to Joe Biden's withdrawal from the presidential campaign, polls indicated a somewhat tight race in the state, but when Kamala Harris became the Democratic nominee, Minnesota polls shifted somewhat more in the Democrats' favor.

Trump became the first Republican presidential nominee to win Carlton County since Herbert Hoover in 1928. With Harris narrowly winning Clay County, which houses Moorhead, this was the first presidential election since 1988 in which said county did not back the winning candidate; during that election, it favored Democrat Michael Dukakis over Republican George H. W. Bush.

Even though Harris won the majority of votes in heavily Somali precincts in Minneapolis, her margins of victory were significantly lower than those of Joe Biden in 2020. For instance, in the Somali American hub of Cedar-Riverside, support for Harris dropped by 14 percentage points compared to 2020. This was part of a nationwide loss of support for the Democrats among Muslim voters, which was attributed to anger over the War in Gaza, backlash against the Democrats over LGBTQ and other cultural issues, and perceptions of a poorly handled economy.

== See also ==
- United States presidential elections in Minnesota
- 2024 United States presidential election
- 2024 Democratic Party presidential primaries
- 2024 Republican Party presidential primaries
- 2024 United States elections

== Notes ==
Partisan clients
