= Kenneth Sanborn =

American politician and judge (1926–2018)

Member of the Michigan House of Representatives from the Macomb County 3rd district
- In office January 9, 1957 – December 1958

Justice of the Peace of Clinton Township, Macomb County, Michigan
- In office 1951–1956

Personal details
- Born: Kenneth Noble Sanborn; November 14, 1926 Detroit, Michigan, U.S.
- Died: November 20, 2018 (aged 92) Macomb Township, Michigan, U.S.
- Cause of death: Heart failure
- Party: Republican
- Spouse: Lois Leidel
- Children: 4, including Alan
- Education: Mackenzie High School; Michigan State University; University of Detroit Mercy School of Law (LLB)
- Profession: Politician, judge
- Known for: Defense of Milo Radulovich

Military service
- Allegiance: United States
- Branch/service: United States Air Force
- Rank: First lieutenant

Kenneth Noble Sanborn (November 14, 1926 – November 20, 2018) was a Michigan politician and judge best known for successfully defending his friend Milo Radulovich against charges of communism in 1953, pro bono. The case was a major factor in helping turn public opinion in the United States against McCarthyism.

== Early life ==
On November 14, 1926, Sanborn was born in Detroit, Michigan. Sanborn attended McKenzie High School in Detroit, Michigan.

Sanborn resided in Mount Clemens, Michigan, for most of his life.

== Education ==
Sanborn attended Michigan State University. In 1949, Sanborn earned a LL.B. degree from University of Detroit College of Arts and Science and the Law School.

== Career ==
After World War II, Sanborn served in the United States Air Force. He became a first lieutenant in the United States Air Force Reserves stationed at Selfridge Air Force Base in the Judge Advocate General's Corps.

In 1953, at age 26, Sanborn and Charles C. Lockwood were lawyers who represented Milo Radulovich pro bono in his fight against the U.S. Air Force. Milo Radulovich was accused of being a security risk for maintaining a "close and continuing relationship" with his father and sister, who were accused of Communist sympathies. Milo Radulovich's commission was reinstated by the U.S. Air Force.

He served as Clinton Township's Justice of the Peace from 1951 to 1956.

On November 6, 1956, Sanborn won the election and became a Republican member of Michigan House of Representatives for Macomb County's 3rd district. Sanborn was sworn in on January 9, 1957, and served until December 1958.

Sanborn served as Clinton Township Supervisor, from 1959 to 1961, and held office as the trustee and chairman of Macomb Community College until 1968.

In 1972, Sanborn became a probate judge in Mount Clemens, and then in 1978 was promoted to circuit judge for Michigan's 16th Circuit Court.

Sanborn served as circuit judge until 1990, when he retired and became a visiting judge for Macomb County.

Sanborn's role in the Radulovich trial is highlighted in the book, To Strike at a King.

== Awards ==
- 1998 Champion of Justice award. Presented by State Bar of Michigan.
- 1998 Honored with State Bar of Michigan Legal Milestone marker at Michigan State University. September 2, 1998.

== Personal life ==
Sanborn's wife is Lois Sanborn (Leidel). They had four children, Christine, Janice, Mark, and Alan.

On November 20, 2018, Sanborn died of congestive heart failure at home in Macomb Township, Michigan. Sanborn was 92 years old.

== See also ==
- McCarthyism
