= 1851 Michigan gubernatorial election =

- November 4, 1851
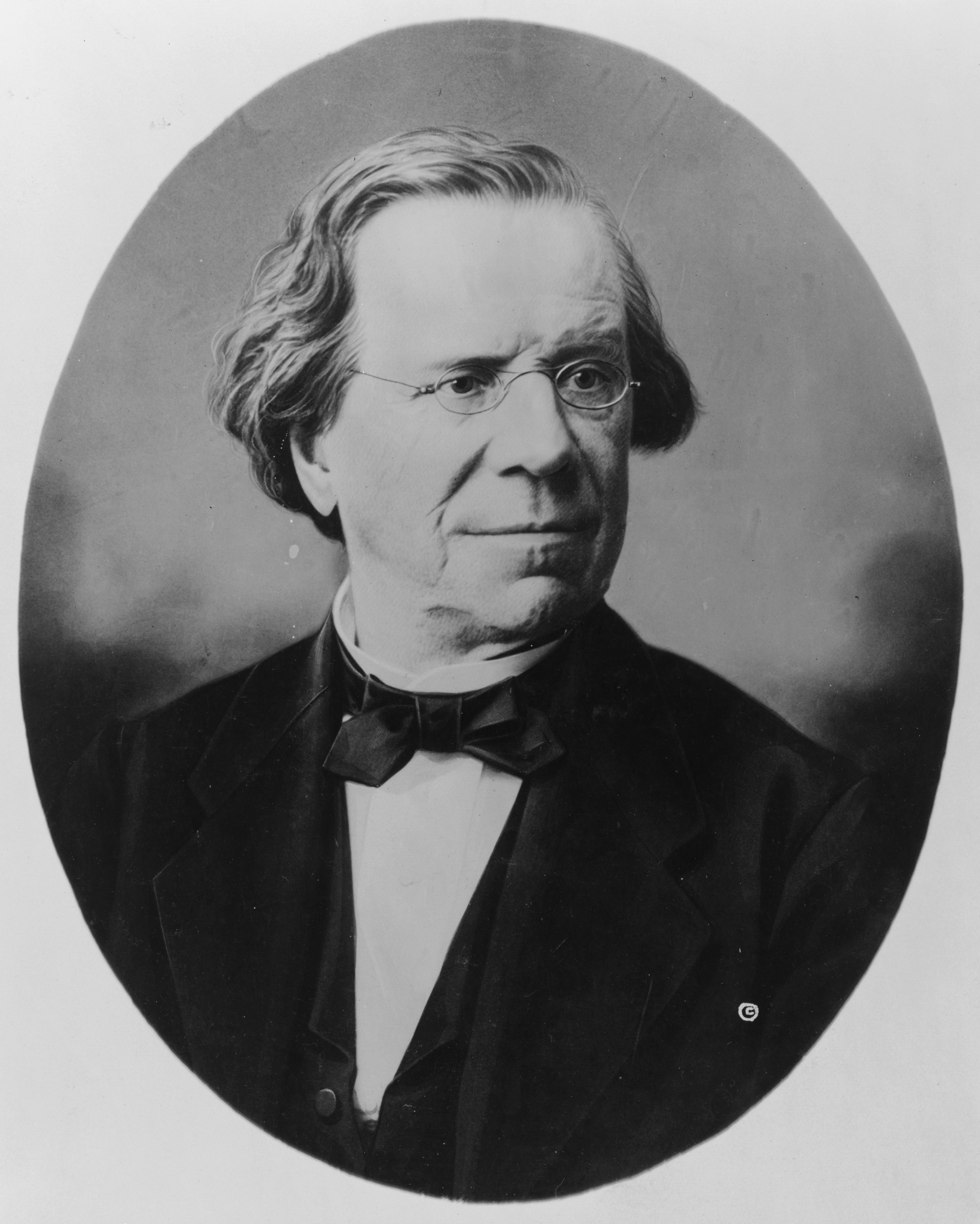

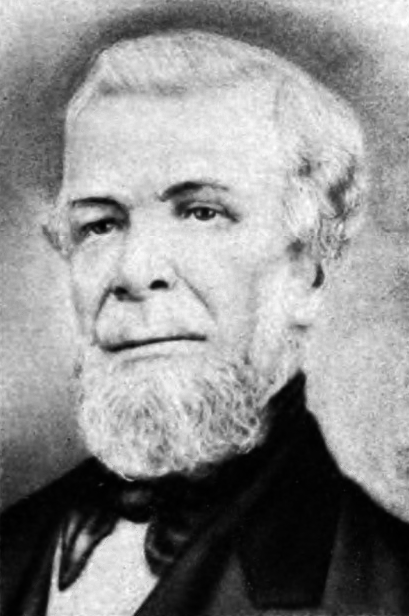
Nominee	Robert McClelland	Townsend E. Gidley
Party	Democratic	Whig
Popular vote	23,827	16,901
Percentage	58.28%	41.34%
- County results McClelland: 50–60% 60–70% 70–80% 80–90% 90–100% Gidley: 50–60% 70–80% No Data/Votes
Governor before election
John S. Barry
Democratic
Elected Governor
Robert McClelland
Democratic

The 1851 Michigan gubernatorial election was held on November 4, 1851. Democratic nominee Robert McClelland defeated Whig nominee Townsend E. Gidley with 58.28% of the vote.

== General election ==
=== Candidates ===
Major party candidates

- Robert McClelland, Democratic
- Townsend E. Gidley, Whig

=== Results ===
1851 Michigan gubernatorial election
Party	Candidate	Votes	%	±%
Democratic	Robert McClelland	23,827	58.28%	+4.30%
Whig	Townsend E. Gidley	16,901	41.34%	−4.31%
	Scattering	156	0.38%	
Majority		6,926	16.94%	
Total votes		40,884	100.00%	
Democratic hold		Swing	+8.61%	

==== Results By County ====
County	Robert McClelland Democratic		Townsend E. Gidley Whig		Scattering Write-in		Margin		Total votes cast
County	#	%	#	%	#	%	#	%	Total votes cast
Allegan	317	55.23%	239	41.64%	18	3.14%	78	13.59%	574
Allegan	399	56.52%	307	43.48%	0	0.00%	92	13.03%	706
Berrien	537	52.70%	470	46.12%	12	1.18%	67	6.58%	1,019
Branch	675	59.73%	444	39.29%	11	0.97%	231	20.44%	1,130
Calhoun	1,246 (Note: Dubin contains a typo for McCelland in this county.)	55.70%	980	43.81%	11	0.49%	266	11.89%	2,237
Cass	549	56.08%	417	42.59%	13	1.33%	132	13.48%	979
Chippewa	22	56.41%	17	43.59%	0	0.00%	5	12.82%	39
Clinton	260	57.65%	191	42.35%	0	0.00%	69	15.30%	451
Eaton	498	56.14%	386	43.52%	3	0.34%	112	12.63%	887
Genesee	640	51.99%	591	48.01%	0	0.00%	49	3.98%	1,231
Hillsdale	1,035	58.11%	744	41.77%	2	0.11%	291	16.34%	1,781
Ingham	638	55.82%	499	43.66%	6	0.52%	139	12.16%	1,143
Ionia	482	57.86%	349 (Note: Dubin contains a typo for Gidley in this county.)	41.90%	2	0.24%	133	15.97%	833
Jackson	1,284	48.33%	1,359	51.15%	14	0.53%	-75	-2.82%	2,657
Kalamazoo	638	48.19%	676	51.06%	10	0.76%	-38	-2.87%	1,324
Kent	748	54.96%	613	45.04%	0	0.00%	135	9.92%	1,361
Lapeer	460	62.16%	280	37.84%	0	0.00%	180	24.32%	740
Lenawee	1,782	58.16%	1,278	41.71%	4	0.13%	504	16.45%	3,064
Livingston	799	61.89%	488	37.80%	4	0.31%	311	24.09%	1,291
Mackinac	59	89.39%	4	6.06%	3	4.55%	55	83.33%	66
Macomb	776	66.61%	386	33.13%	3	0.26%	390	33.48%	1,165
Marquette	53	86.89%	8	13.11%	0	0.00%	45	73.77%	61
Monroe	1,418	83.61%	278	16.39%	0	0.00%	1,140	67.22%	1,696
Montcalm	67	62.04%	41	37.96%	0	0.00%	26	24.07%	108
Newaygo	72	64.86%	39	35.14%	0	0.00%	33	29.73%	111
Oakland	1,726	56.20%	1,339	43.60%	6	0.20%	387	12.60%	3,071
Ottawa	277	72.14%	105	27.34%	2	0.52%	172	44.79%	384
Saginaw	220	62.50%	129	36.65%	3	0.85%	91	25.85%	352
Sanilac	82	82.83%	14	14.14%	3	3.03%	68	68.69%	99
Shiawassee	290	52.82%	253	46.08%	6	1.09%	37	6.74%	549
St. Clair	405	57.94%	293	41.92%	1	0.14%	112	16.02%	699
St. Joseph	747	57.59%	538	41.48%	12	0.93%	209	16.11%	1,297
Tuscola	23	29.87%	54	70.13%	0	0.00%	-31	-40.26%	77
Van Buren	415	57.96%	298	41.62%	3	0.42%	117	16.34%	716
Washtenaw	1,495	52.02%	1,376	47.88%	3	0.10%	119	4.14%	2,874
Wayne	2,693	65.49%	1,418	34.48%	1	0.02%	1,275	31.01%	4,112
Total	23,827	58.28%	16,901	41.34%	156	0.38%	6,926	16.94%	40,884

===== Counties that flipped from Whig to Democratic =====
- Calhoun
- Chippewa
- Eaton
- Genesee
- Ionia
- Washtenaw

===== Counties that flipped from Democratic to Whig =====
- Kalamazoo
