= 1974 Michigan Secretary of State election =

- November 5, 1974
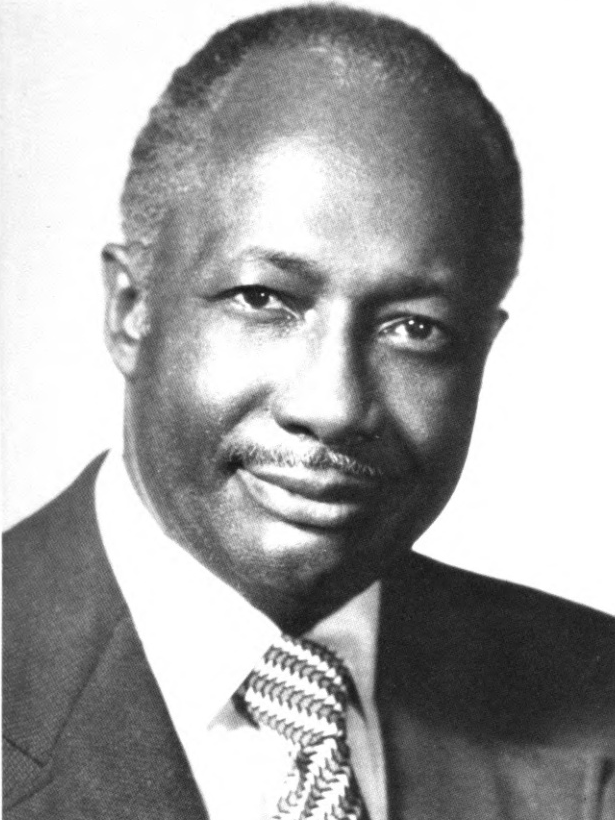

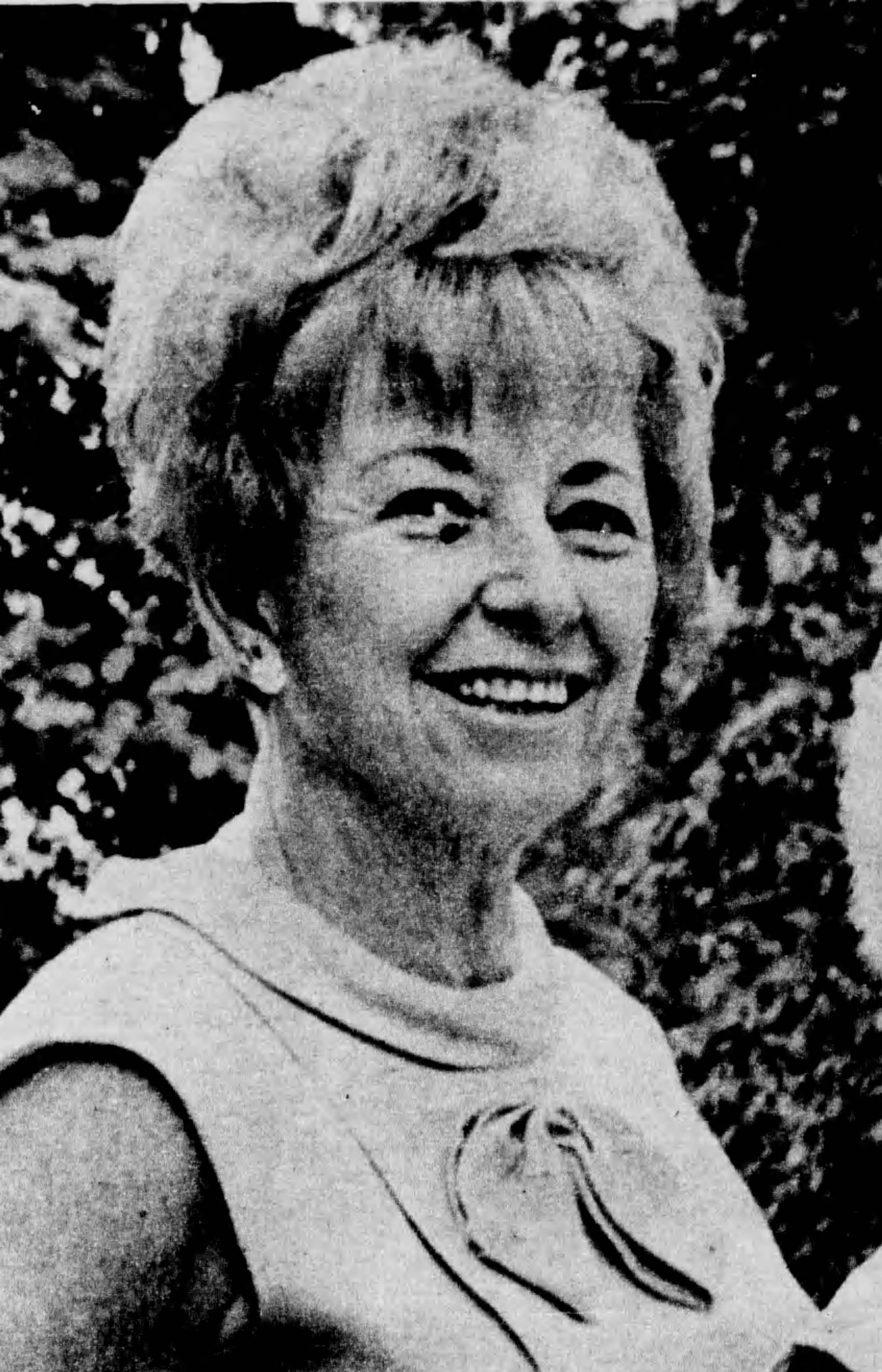
Nominee	Richard H. Austin	N. Lorraine Beebe
Party	Democratic	Republican
Popular vote	1,767,344	742,805
Percentage	69.27%	29.11%
Secretary of State before election
Richard H. Austin
Democratic
Elected Secretary of State
Richard H. Austin
Democratic

The 1974 Michigan secretary of state election was held on November 5. Incumbent Democrat Richard H. Austin defeated Republican nominee N. Lorraine Beebe.

== History ==
Incumbent Democrat Richard H. Austin was first elected state secretary of state in 1970. He was the first Black Michigan secretary of state, and sought a second term in 1974. N. Lorraine Beebe, former state senator, announced she would seek the Republican nomination for secretary of state in June 1972. She had resigned as executive director of the Michigan Consumers Council a month earlier, amidst reports of dissatisfaction with her performance from Governor William Milliken. She announced her candidacy without consulting with her party.

The Democratic state convention was held from August 24 to 25 at Civic Auditorium in Grand Rapids. The Republican state convention was held from August 23 to 24 at Cobo Hall in Detroit. Both Austin and Beebe were unopposed for nomination at their respective conventions. Beebe was reported as the first woman nominated for secretary of state in Michigan.

Beebe's campaign was underfunded compared to Austin's. Austin won re-election. He was sworn in on January 1, 1975.

== Results ==
The following are the official results as printed in the 1975–1976 Michigan Manual.

1974 Michigan secretary of state election
Party	Candidate	Votes	%
Democratic	Richard H. Austin (incumbent)	1,767,344	69.27%
Republican	N. Lorraine Beebe	742,805	29.11%
American Independent	Henry W. Kroes Jr.	16,791	0.65%
Human Rights	James F. McClure	13,990	0.54%
Conservative	Robert G. Lee	4,434	0.17%
Socialist Workers	Rachele Fruit	2,250	0.08%
U.S. Labor	Judith S. Crowell	1,858	0.07%
Socialist Labor	John Gill Motzer	1,674	0.06%
Write-in		12	0.00%
Total votes		2,551,158	100.0
Democratic hold			
