= Moses Archibald McNaughton =

American politician (1813–1901)

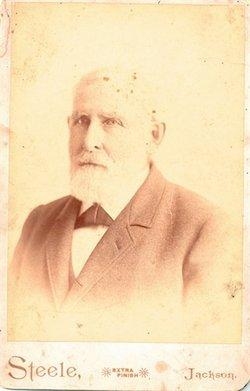

Member of the Michigan Senate from the 12th district
- In office 1853–1854
- Preceded by: District established
- Succeeded by: Austin Blair

Personal details
- Born: January 4, 1813 Argyle, New York, US
- Died: January 18, 1901 (aged 88)
- Party: Republican
- Other political affiliations: Free Soil

Moses Archibald McNaughton (January 4, 1813 – January 18, 1901) was a medical doctor, railroad developer, real estate developer, and early pioneer of Jackson, Michigan. As an anti-slavery activist, he was a founding member of the Republican Party and was honored by calling to order the first official Republican party meeting, which was held in Jackson with over 1500 people in attendance. He later represented Michigan as a delegate to the first national Republican meeting in 1856. McNaughton served in the Michigan Senate, where he represented the 12th district, in 1853 on the Free Soil ticket, which was organized to stop slavery. McNaughton also served as Mayor of Jackson from 1866 to 1867. Having held many public trust positions, he was considered to be influential in the building of the state of Michigan.

== Early life, education, and marriage ==
The youngest of 11 children, McNaughton was born in Argyle, New York in 1813 to Robert and Isabella McNaughton. Both of his parents were of Scottish ancestry. McNaughton was the great-grandson of Alexander McNaughton who helped found Argyle, NY, after immigrating to the United States in 1738. Alexander was credited with securing a large land tract with his fellow Scottish immigrants.

McNaughton first attended Wyoming Academy. He went on to spend two years at Union College and later graduated from Fairfield Medical College in 1840. To start his medical career, McNaughton then moved to Jackson in 1841.

He married his first wife Sarah Orcutt on July 1, 1835, in Wyoming, New York. Sarah gave birth to twins, Moses and Hugh. Moses died as an infant and Sarah died shortly after child birth on June 25, 1836, at the age of 23.

McNaughton married his second wife, Mary Turner, on April 6, 1848. Mary and Moses went on to have four children together, including Charles, Robert, Archie and Mary Bell.

== Medical doctor and notable businessman ==
McNaughton spent 12 years in Jackson practicing as a medical doctor and then got involved in other business activities. For example, he secured a large amount of property north of I-94 along Cooper Street—this was in addition to land he purchased in Rives Township. As a pioneer, he was the original owner of the land that the Jackson District Library's Carnegie Branch is located upon.

He was involved in building several key railroads in Michigan. In the 1860s, he was involved with the Michigan Air Line Railroad as a director and was the treasurer and investor of Grand River Valley Railroad. In addition to the active contributions to the development of land and rail around the Jackson area, he was also part owner of one gold mine and five silver mines. He was an officer of the Jackson Bonanza Mining Company.

To honor the McNaughton clan, he secured a plot in the Oaks Cemetery and imported a 30-foot marble monument from Scotland.

== Politics, anti-slavery activism and founding of the Republican Party ==
McNaughton was a recognized anti-slavery activist and was very involved in the anti-slavery movement. This included being present at an anti-slavery convention in Kalamazoo, Michigan on June 21, 1854, that led up to the first official Republican meeting that was held in Jackson on July 6, 1854. At the Kalamazoo convention, McNaughton was made President and temporary chairman.

He has been credited as one of the organizing members of the Republican Party. At the first official meeting of the Republican party, McNaughton was honored by calling this first meeting to order. Later, he was in attendance at the first national Republican meeting as one of fourteen Michigan delegates.

Due to his business successes, McNaughton built a mansion that was located on a hilltop on W. Trail Street. It was later found to have tunnels that led away from the mansion. There have been reports that these tunnels were used in the Underground Railroad during the Civil War. Though, this has not been proven and some speculate that the tunnels were a part of a coal mine or a form of ventilation.

== The Jackson legend of Little Mary ==
McNaughton's granddaughter was Mary McNaughton who was born in Jackson, Michigan. The story of Mary is considered one of Michigan's top ghost stories, and her grave is still regularly visited by locals. However, the Jackson legend and the events surrounding it have been strongly disputed by her youngest sibling (Donald McNaughton).
