= State Bar of Michigan =

Bar Association

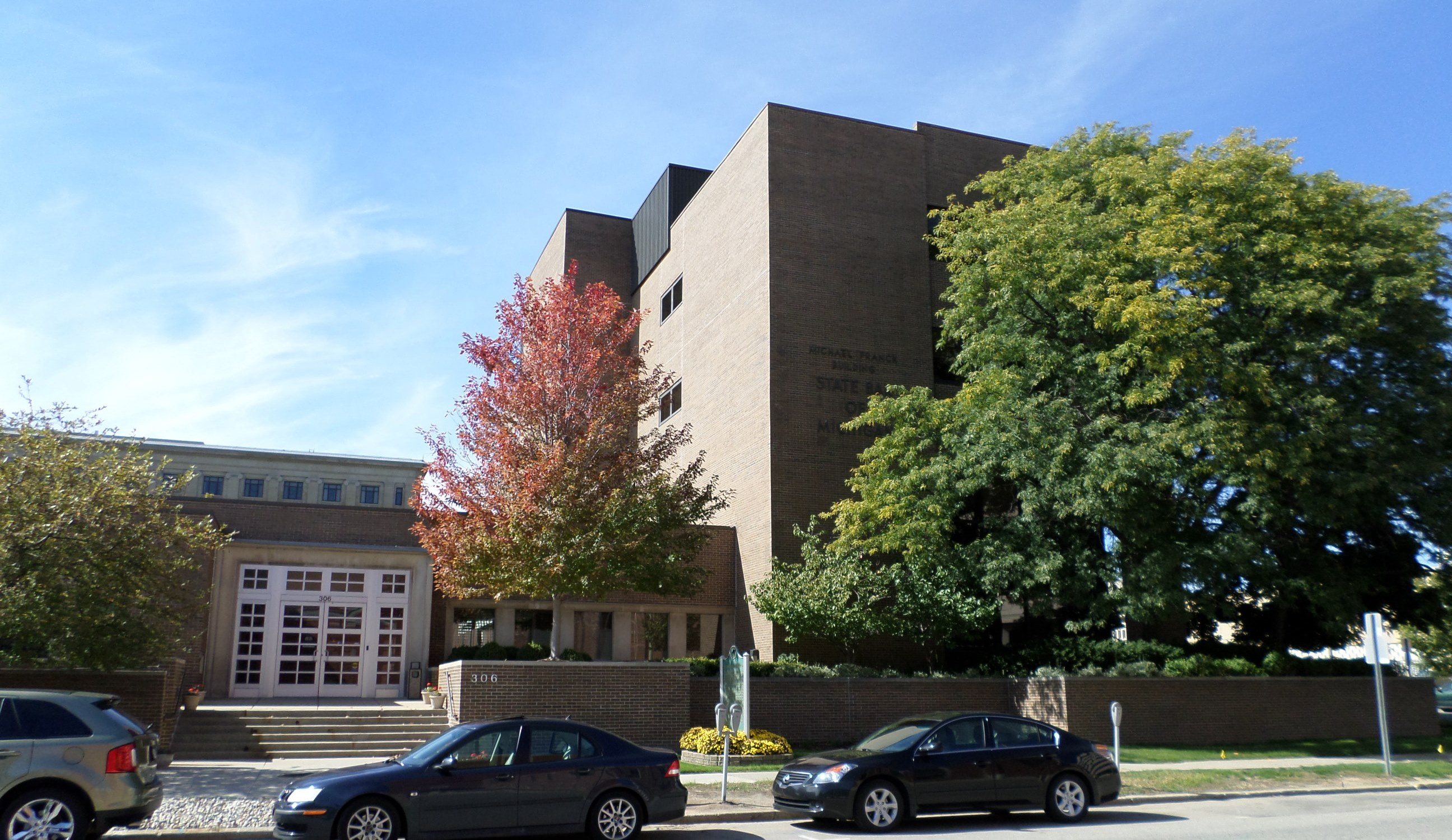
- Type: Legal Society
- Headquarters: Lansing, Michigan, U.S.
- Location: United States
- Members: 45,715 in 2018
- Website: https://www.michbar.org

The State Bar of Michigan is the governing body for lawyers in the State of Michigan. Membership is mandatory for attorneys who practice law in Michigan. The organization's mission is to aid in promoting improvements in the administration of justice and advancements in jurisprudence, improving relations between the legal profession and the public, and promoting the interests of the legal profession in Michigan.

== History & Organization ==
Under the authority of the Michigan Constitution Article 6, the Michigan Supreme Court established the State Bar of Michigan in 1935. The organization is governed by the Michigan Supreme Court Rules concerning the State Bar of Michigan.

A Board of Commissioners, number 31-33 members, governs the State Bar. The Bar's elected officers include a president, president-elect, vice president, secretary, and treasurer. A 10-member executive committee composed of the officers, a Representative Assembly chair and vice-chair, and three other commissioners chosen by the president manage the affairs of the Bar between board meetings. Standing committees of the Board provide oversight to the operations of the Bar in strategic planning, finance, public policy, member services, and other matters. A 150-member Representative Assembly is the final policy making body of the State Bar. In 2019, the Bar had more than 45,000 members.

== State Bar Programs & Services ==
The State Bar provides a wide variety of programs and services benefiting both the public interest and the attorneys in Michigan. Among them:

- Conducting the Bar's Character and Fitness investigations to ensure attorneys admitted to the bar meet appropriate professional standards.
- Investigating and prosecuting parties involved in the unauthorized practice of law (UPL), which helps ensure legal services to the public are provided only by those attorneys who are in good standing.
- Providing ethics counseling and advising lawyers and judges about the propriety of their conduct with respect to the Code of Professional Conduct and Code of Judicial Conduct.
- Providing the Practice Management Resource Center, a broad-based information clearinghouse and referral source for Michigan lawyers for all services and goods necessary to successfully manage a legal practice. Resources include a website, telephone hotline, lending library, technology training, and onsite assessments and evaluations.
- Reviewing and evaluating new laws and court rules for their impact on the administration of justice and on the profession through State Bar committees, sections, Board of Commissioners, and Representative Assembly.
- Advocating public policy positions and seeking legislative support for those positions, as permitted by AO 2004-01 (Keller).
- Publishing the Michigan Bar Journal 11 times a year and a Resource Directory issue.
- Publishing the e-Journal, which updates the legal profession daily on changes to laws and summarizes cases to help attorneys stay up to date with the law as it emerges from the courts.
- Publishing the SBM NewsLinks, a daily email summary of law-related news articles carried in major local, state, and national media.
- Operating a Public Policy Resource Center to increase awareness of public policy issues of particular interest to lawyers.
- Maintaining an internet site that serves as both a research tool and a source of information regarding the organization.
- Administering the Client Protection Fund that provides for reimbursements to members of the general public who have been victimized by the few lawyers who have misappropriated funds entrusted to them.
- Operating a lawyer referral service that provides referrals to the general public.
- Administering the Bar's justice initiatives programs, which include promoting the effective delivery of high quality legal services to all Michigan residents, especially those with lower incomes; raising both public and professional awareness of the fair delivery of justice in our state and promoting equal application of law for all citizens; and administering the Bar's Access to Justice development fundraising campaign, which supports private giving to non-profit civil legal aid programs in Michigan. Pledge Form
- Operating the Lawyers and Judges Assistance Program that provides confidential personal counseling services to the Bar's members.
- Providing affinity programs that offer discounted services including credit cards, insurance, rental cars, and other business and personal services.
- Providing annual Bar membership identification cards to attorneys and, when requested, Certificates of Good Standing.
- Providing a member orientation for the newest members of the Bar.
- Providing attorneys the opportunity to actively participate, network, and share information in Bar interest groups (sections) and Bar committees, including providing administrative support to these groups.
- Providing Bar organizations with a "print on demand" service for newsletter preparation.
- Holding an annual meeting.
- Conducting the Upper Michigan Legal Institute, which provides educational opportunities for Northern Michigan lawyers.
- Providing Casemaker, an online tool for attorneys to search for case law and related references.
- Providing attorneys and Bar organizations with meeting rooms and related meeting services at the State Bar headquarters.

== Institute of Continuing Legal Education ==
The Institute of Continuing Legal Education is the continuing legal education arm of the State Bar of Michigan. It began after a request by the State Bar's Board of Commissioners in 1959 and opened in 1960 with the cooperation of the law schools of the University of Michigan Law School and Wayne State University Law School. It is based in Ann Arbor close to the University of Michigan Law School.

The sponsors of ICLE are the State Bar of Michigan, the University of Michigan Law School, Wayne State University Law School, the University of Detroit Mercy School of Law, the Michigan State University College of Law, and Western Michigan University Cooley Law School.

ICLE operates through:

- partnering with legal professionals to provide legal resources, research and advice
- providing a series of seminars and publications
- arranging for ongoing education through a certificate program
- providing a legal library and bookstore service

== Michigan Legal Milestones ==
The organization has commemorated many Michigan Legal Milestones. Those include:

1. Ossian Sweet Trial, which was presided over by Frank Murphy and defended by Clarence Darrow.
2. Baseball's [[Reserve Clause]]
3. Thomas M. Cooley Law Office
4. Theodore Roosevelt-Newett libel trial at the Marquette County, Michigan Courthouse. Roosevelt won the verdict, but was awarded a dime.
5. Justice William A. Fletcher—the first chief justice of the Michigan Supreme Court.
6. Sojourner Truth, African-American abolitionist and women's rights activist
7. Augustus Woodward—first chief justice of the Michigan territorial court.
8. Public Access to Public Water
9. Ten Hours or No Sawdust—Michigan's largest labor strike of the 19th century.
10. 1961-62 Michigan Constitutional Convention
11. Eva Belles' Vote—an early victory for women's suffrage won in Flint, Michigan.
12. One Person, One Vote
13. Improving Justice—the idea for the American Judicature Society created in Manistee, Michigan.
14. The King's Grant—a celebrated cases of the 19th century involving a dispute over land granted by French King Louis XV in 1750.
15. The Uninvited Ear—Judge Damon Keith's decision in a 1971 case upheld the right of Americans to be free from unreasonable government intrusion.
16. Laughing Whitefish—an 1889 decision by the Michigan Supreme Court recognizing the legal validity of Native American tribal laws and customs.
17. Protecting the Impaired—a Michigan Supreme Court decision overturning as unconstitutional an act of the Michigan legislature providing for forced sterilization of the mentally impaired. Compare Buck vs. Bell.
18. Rose of Aberlone—the classic contracts case involving Hiram Walker & Sons, Rose the cow, and the principle of rescission based on mutual mistake.
19. Emelia Schaub—Michigan's first woman elected prosecutor, the first woman in the United States to successfully defend a murder trial, and a protector of "the rights and tribal existence of native Americans in northwest Michigan."
20. 1948 decision in Anderson v. Mt. Clemens Pottery Co.—Supreme Court Associate Justice Frank Murphy important decision interpreting the Fair Labor Standards Act.
21. Pond's Defense—Michigan Supreme Court Justice James Campbell authored an important decision about self-defense and defense of others in 1860 in Pond v. People.
22. Ending Jim Crow—Keith's Theatre in Grand Rapids discriminated against patrons based on their race, but that practice was found to violate Michigan's Constitution by the Michigan Supreme Court.
23. Conveying Michigan
24. Frank Murphy's Dissent in Korematsu vs. United States.
25. Striking Racial Covenants—the United States Supreme Court rejected racial restrictive covenants in deeds that would have prevented Orsel and Minnie McGhee and their family from living where they chose in Detroit.
26. Milo Radulovich and the Fall of McCarthyism—in 1953, two Michigan attorneys, the Hon. Kenneth N. Sanborn and Charles C. Lockwood assisted Milo Radulovich, a resident of Dexter, Michigan, in his fight against the United States Air Force.
27. Committee of One—Judge Henry Hart of Midland, led a "one-man campaign" for the uniform placement of yellow "No Passing Zone" signs on the left side of Michigan Roads.
28. Pioneer, Advocate, Woman—Mary Coleman, first female Michigan Supreme Court Justice and Chief Justice, who made a lasting impact on Michigan's judicial system.
29. President Gerald R. Ford—38th President of the United States was a Michigan lawyer practicing in Grand Rapids.
30. Freedom Road—In Dowagiac, Michigan residents of Cass County rallied to protect runaway slaves in the Kentucky Raid of 1847.
31. Otis Milton Smith (1922–1994) was an outstanding leader, lawyer, and dedicated public servant who overcame poverty and prejudice. He served as chair of the Michigan Public Service Commission, justice of the Michigan Supreme Court, regent of the University of Michigan, and a vice president and general counsel of the General Motors Corporation.
32. Prentiss Marsh Brown, a St. Ignace lawyer, is best remembered as the "father of the Mackinac Bridge." He was appointed chair of the Mackinac Bridge Authority.
33. Poletown & Eminent Domain
34. From a Whisper to a Rallying Cry
35. Elk, Oil, & the Environment
36. Milliken v. Bradley
37. Elliott-Larsen Civil Rights Act
38. Berrien County Courthouse
39. The Great Ferris Fire
40. The Kalamazoo Case: Establishing High School for All
