= David Jaye =

American politician

Member of the Michigan Senate from the 12th district
- In office December 12, 1997 – May 24, 2001
- Preceded by: Doug Carl
- Succeeded by: Alan Sanborn

Member of the Michigan House of Representatives
- In office January 1, 1989 – December 12, 1997
- Preceded by: Bill Browne
- Succeeded by: Alan Sanborn
- Constituency: 26th district (1989–1992); 32nd district (1993–1997)

Personal details
- Born: February 4, 1958 (age 68)
- Party: Republican
- Education: University of Michigan (B .S., M.S., public policy studies)
- Footnotes

David Jaye (born 1958) is a former Republican politician from Michigan. He was the first state senator in Michigan's history to be expelled from the State Senate. He represented a district in Macomb County from 1997 to 2001, when he was forced out of the Senate.

== Political career ==
Dave Jaye received his master's degree and bachelor's degree with honors from the University of Michigan, Ann Arbor and was elected to the Macomb County Commission in 1984.

Jaye was elected State Representative for Michigan's 32nd District in 1988 defeating then incumbent Democratic representative Bill Browne. Dave Jaye was an advocate of hunting and gun rights and led to Michigan adopting a concealed carry law. He served on the Executive Board of the Macomb County Taxpayers' Association. Dave Jaye was a leader on efforts to ban affirmative action at state educational institutions.

Jaye then served in the House until 1998, when he vacated his seat to run for the 12th State Senate district seat (representing Macomb County) to fill the seat that was vacated by Sen. Doug Carl, who died of a heart attack.

== Expulsion ==
Jaye was arrested and found guilty on three separate occasions for driving under the influence. It was also alleged that he sexually assaulted his girlfriend at the time, verbally abused his staff, and kept sexually explicit images on his state computer. He was expelled by an almost unanimous vote, the first Michigan State Senator to be ejected. Despite his expulsion, he re-ran for his seat, but placed third in the Republican primary. He was replaced by Alan Sanborn, who won the Republican primary and general election.
