= Doug Carl =

American politician (1951–1997)

Member of the Michigan Senate
- In office January 1, 1987 – August 17, 1997
- Preceded by: Kirby Holmes
- Succeeded by: David Jaye
- Constituency: 9th district (1987–1994); 12th district (1995–1997)

Member of the Michigan House of Representatives from the 26th district
- In office January 1, 1985 – December 31, 1986
- Preceded by: Mary Ellen Parrott
- Succeeded by: William S. Browne

Personal details
- Born: August 12, 1951 Almont, Michigan
- Died: August 17, 1997 (aged 46) St. Joseph Mercy Hospital, Clinton Township, Michigan
- Resting place: Romeo Village Cemetery, Romeo, Michigan
- Party: Republican
- Spouse: Maria
- Education: Michigan State University

Douglas Carl (August 12, 1951 – August 17, 1997) was a state senator in Michigan. From 1987 to 1994, he represented the 9th Senate district, and then from 1995 to his death in 1997, he represented the 12th district. He also ran as the Republican nominee in Michigan's 12th Congressional District in 1988 and in the 10th Congressional District in 1992, losing to David Bonior both times.

Carl served in the Michigan House of Representatives from 1984 to 1986 and in the Michigan State Senate from 1987 until his death.

Ronald Reagan attended a campaign rally at Macomb Community College in 1988 in which he urged people to vote for Carl.

== Family ==
In 1983 Carl married Maria. They had one daughter, Colleen.

Carl's widow, Maria Carl, ran in the 2004 Republican primary for the Michigan House of Representatives against incumbent Leon Drolet after he voted against legislation defining marriage as a union of a man and a woman. She lost the nomination to Drolet.

In November 2015, Colleen Carl, the daughter of the late state senator Doug Carl announced her candidacy for Michigan House of Representatives in the 33rd District for the primary election that occurred August 2016.

== Sources ==
- political graveyard entry for Carl
- bill to rename part of M-53 after Carl
- bio of Maria Carl
- Colleen Carl
