= David Plawecki =

American politician

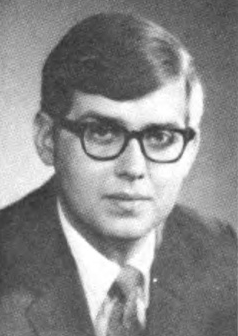

Member of the Michigan Senate from the 12th district
- In office January 1, 1971 – December 31, 1982
- Preceded by: N. Lorraine Beebe
- Succeeded by: William Faust

Personal details
- Born: November 8, 1947
- Died: August 4, 2013 (aged 65)
- Party: Democratic

David A. Plawecki (November 8, 1947 – August 4, 2013) was an American politician.

Born in Detroit, Michigan, Plawecki served in the Michigan State Senate as a Democrat during 1970–1982. While serving in the Michigan State Senate, he authored PA 267 of 1976, also known as Michigan's Open Meetings Act, which has since been a key piece of legislation for government transparency. Plawecki lived in Dearborn Heights, Michigan, and was an engineer. Later, he was deputy director of the Michigan State Department of Labor and Economic Growth. He was Polish-American.
