= Townsend E. Gidley =

American politician

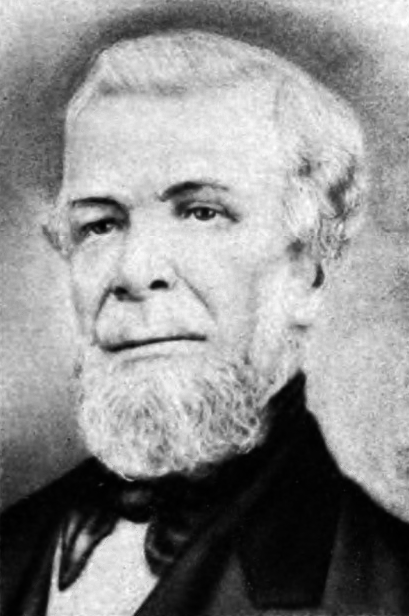

Member of the Michigan House of Representatives from the Jackson County district
- In office November 2, 1835 – January 1, 1837
- In office January 8, 1838 – January 6, 1839
- In office January 7, 1850 – January 31, 1851

Member of the Michigan Senate from the 5th district
- In office January 7, 1839 – January 2, 1842

Member of the Michigan Senate from the 4th district
- In office January 3, 1842 – January 1, 1843

Member of the Michigan Senate from the 12th district
- In office January 7, 1863 – January 3, 1865
- Preceded by: Charles V. DeLand
- Succeeded by: Richard J. Crego

Personal details
- Born: July 20, 1805 Poughkeepsie, New York
- Died: October 8, 1888 (aged 83) Grand Haven, Michigan
- Party: Whig

Townsend E. Gidley (July 20, 1805 – October 8, 1888) was an American politician who served eight terms in the Michigan Legislature and was instrumental in the drafting of the state's first constitution.

== Biography ==
Townsend E. Gidley was born in Poughkeepsie, New York, on July 20, 1805, the son of Daniel Gidley, a hatter who had retired to his farm. Gidley attended the area schools and worked on the farm until the age of 15, when he was sent away to an academy in Bethlehem, Connecticut, to study, focusing on business and mercantile matters. He then spent another year at an academy in Poultney, Vermont, then returned home and became an apprentice under an area merchant named Walter Cunningham. He stayed with Cunningham until he was 21, then went into the mercantile business with a partner, Stephen Frost, doing business as Frost & Gidley for the next eight years. Gidley had reached the rank of second lieutenant in the area militia by the age of 19, and later often told the story of being introduced to the Marquis de Lafayette when he reviewed the troops during his visit to Poughkeepsie in 1824.

In the spring of 1834, Gidley sold his share of the business and used the proceeds to buy several hundred acres of fertile land in Jackson County, Michigan Territory. He moved his family first to Detroit to purchase supplies, then to the lands in Jackson. He began farming on a larger scale than the area was used to, planting 300 acres (120 ha) of wheat in his first year; within a few years he was also the largest fruit grower in the state.

=== Political career ===
He was elected as the youngest of the 88 delegates to the state constitutional convention that began on May 11, 1835, and was appointed to a committee of 19 charged with drafting the constitution in an attempt to speed up its slow progress over its first four days. He was one of an even smaller group of five delegates who worked in secret to write a draft that was presented on May 19 to the rest of the convention, which then used it as the basis for further work. Gidley was one of two votes against the final version of the proposed constitution, on the grounds that it granted voting rights to non-citizens, which he opposed.

Gidley was one of the organizers of the Whig Party in Jackson County. His property in Parma, Michigan, was a stop on the Underground Railroad. In the election held in October 1835, which also approved the constitution, he was elected to the newly-created Michigan House of Representatives. He was re-elected multiple times over the next 28 years, serving in both the house and the Michigan Senate for a total of eight terms. He was the Whig candidate for governor in 1851, losing to Robert McClelland.

=== Later years ===
He suffered from a throat disease in 1863 that forced his retirement from politics, and he sold his farm in Jackson and purchased 2,000 acres (810 ha) near Grand Haven, Michigan, in order to take advantage of the lake breeze that he felt alleviated his symptoms. He died there on October 8, 1888.

=== Family ===
At age 25, Gidley married Emily Power of Poughkeepsie. They had a son, Sands, and a daughter, Isabella. His wife died on February 25, 1856, and he remarried around 1879, to a much younger woman named Mary Henderson.

== Notes ==
Party political offices
Preceded by Flavius J. Littlejohn	Whig nominee for Governor of Michigan; 1851	Succeeded by Zachariah Chandler
