= Rachele Fruit =

American political activist (born 1949)

- Born: October 4, 1949 (age 77); Philadelphia, Pennsylvania, U.S.
- Education: University of Pennsylvania
- Occupation: Political activist
- Political party: Socialist Workers

Rachele Fruit (born October 4, 1949) is an American, pro-Israel activist who was the Socialist Workers Party's nominee for president of the United States in the 2024 election.

== Early life and career ==
Fruit was born on October 4, 1949, in Philadelphia. Her family were secular Jews and she attended Hebrew School. Fruit has worked a series of jobs throughout her life, including as a meatpacker, trade unionist, a ramp worker for Eastern Airlines, and a Walmart employee. During the 1980s she resided in Baltimore before moving to Atlanta and then Miami.

== Activism and political candidacy ==
Fruit began involving herself in politics during the 1970s, participating in protests against the Vietnam War.

=== Elections contested ===
Fruit has run for numerous offices since the 1970s. She ran for Michigan Secretary of State in 1974.

==== 2018 Georgia gubernatorial election ====
In 2018, the Atlanta Branch of the Socialist Workers Party nominated Fruit for governor of Georgia. She initially ran as a write-in candidate to oppose Democratic nominee Stacey Abrams but withdrew from the election. She campaigned on giving ex-prisoners the right to vote.

==== 2024 presidential election ====
The Socialist Workers Party nominated Fruit alongside vice-presidential candidate Dennis Richter. The ticket appeared on the ballot in six states: Louisiana, Minnesota, New Jersey, Tennessee, Vermont, and Washington. Fruit and Richter expressed strong support for Israel in the Gaza war and branded themselves as working-class candidates.

Fruit received the following vote totals: Louisiana (361), Minnesota (745), New Jersey (1,316), Tennessee (985), Vermont (211), and Washington (607).

==== Other elections ====
Fruit had her best statistical performance in the 2013 Atlanta city council presidential election, receiving 8,598 votes (19.71%) and placing second behind Ceasar Mitchell.

== Personal life ==
Fruit resides in Miami, Florida.
