= Michael Ranville =

American political lobbyist and author (1943–2025)

Michael W. Ranville (December 3, 1943 – July 19, 2025) was an American political consultant and author.

== Background ==
Ranville was a native of Flint, Michigan, and attended St. Agnes High School. He received his bachelor's degree from Central Michigan University and served in the United States Air Force from 1966 through 1970. Ranville subsequently returned to Central Michigan University and received his master's degree in communications in 1973.

Ranville resided in Charlotte, Michigan, from 1970 until his death. He died on July 19, 2025, at the age of 81.

== Career ==
After completing his master's degree, Ranville entered the private sector specializing in public relations and corporate communications. In 1976, he joined the professional staff of the Michigan Senate where he ultimately rose to the position of Research Director for the Democratic majority staff.

In 1982, Mr. Ranville joined the Michigan political lobbying and public relations firm of Karoub Associates, eventually rising to senior partner. Significant among the clients Ranville represented was the Michigan Library Association, for whom he waged a number of highly visible political battles on behalf of librarians' First Amendment rights. He retired in 2009.

Ranville was the author of numerous articles on modern political history and sports that have appeared in publications including The Sporting News and Michigan History Magazine.

In the late 1990s, Ranville was drawn to the case of Lieutenant Milo Radulovich, a Michigan native and Air Force Reserve officer who was designated as a security risk in the early 1950s. The Air Force claimed that Radulovich presented a risk because his father and sister were leftist or Communist sympathizers. Despite the fact that Radulovich himself was never accused of any disloyalty, the Air Force sought his dismissal. The case attracted the interest of famed CBS newsmen Edward R. Murrow and Fred W. Friendly, and their colleagues at CBS News. Radulovich's plight became the subject of an episode of Murrow's "See It Now" series. The program which aired on October 20, 1953, led to an Air Force review of the matter and Radulovich's reinstatement.

Ranville's research concerning Radulovich's efforts to clear his name led him to write the book, To Strike at a King: the Turning Point in the McCarthy Witch-Hunts from Momentum Books in 1996. Ranville gave numerous interviews and speeches concerning the Radulovich case. The long-forgotten Radulovich story unearthed by Ranville also comprised a principal element of the 2005 George Clooney–produced film Good Night, and Good Luck about Edward R. Murrow and his fight against McCarthyism.

Ranville was the recipient of numerous awards and served on the Michigan Historical Commission.
