= Abortion in Michigan =

2022 Michigan Proposal 3 results map by county

Abortion in Michigan is legal throughout pregnancy. A state constitutional amendment to explicitly guarantee abortion rights was placed on the ballot in 2022 as Proposal 22–3; it passed with 57 percent of the vote, adding the right to abortion and contraceptive use to the Michigan Constitution. The amendment largely prevents the regulation of abortion before fetal viability, unless said regulations are to protect the individual seeking an abortion, and it also makes it unconstitutional to make laws restricting abortions which would protect the life and health, physical and/or mental, of the pregnant individual seeking abortion.

== History ==
=== Legislative history ===
In the 19th century, bans by state legislatures on abortion were about protecting the life of the mother given the number of deaths caused by abortions; state governments saw themselves as looking out for the lives of their citizens. In 1931, a law, Section 750.14, was passed that made abortion illegal in the state. By the end of the 19th century, all states in the Union except Louisiana had therapeutic exceptions in their legislative bans on abortions.

In 2006, the parents of Becky Bell, a girl whose death was related to the existence of parental consent rules, testified before the Michigan House of Representatives in opposition to a pending parental consent law. The state was one of 23 states in 2007 to have a detailed abortion-specific informed consent requirement. Michigan was the only state with a detailed informed consent statute that provided women seeking abortions on the state website with information about pregnancy relative to how far along the woman is. Georgia, Michigan, Arkansas and Idaho all required in 2007 that women must be provided by an abortion clinic with the option to view an image their fetus if an ultrasound is used prior to the abortion taking place. Michigan was the only state of the 23 with written informed consent materials that did not require abortion providers to give patients information about abortion alternatives.

In 2013, state Targeted Regulation of Abortion Providers (TRAP) law applied to medication induced abortions in addition to abortion clinics. The state legislature was one of ten states nationwide that tried to unsuccessfully pass a fetal heartbeat bill in 2018. Only Iowa successfully passed such a bill, but it was struck down by the courts.

In May 2019, the Republican-dominated state Legislature passed HB 4320-4321 and SB 229-230 which banned dilation and evacuation abortions. They specified criminal sentences of two years for anyone who performed this type of abortion procedure. The legislation passed 22–16 in the Senate and 58–51 in the House. Michigan Governor Gretchen Whitmer promised to veto the legislation and any similar legislation attempting to ban abortions in the state. As of May 14, 2019, the state prohibited abortions after the fetus was viable, generally some point between week 24 and 28. This period uses a standard defined by the US Supreme Court in 1973 with the Roe v. Wade ruling.

In 2022, an activist group called Reproductive Freedom for All started a ballot initiative, which sought to enshrine the right to abortion, among other pregnancy related matters, in the Michigan Constitution. On July 11, 753,759 signatures were submitted to get the proposed amendment on the ballot in the November general election. The signatures were verified by the Bureau of Elections who recommended that it be included on the ballot, but the Board of State Canvassers deadlocked along party lines, preventing the initiative from moving forward. The Republican members of the board claimed the initiative to be invalid due to formatting errors. The matter was appealed to the Michigan Supreme Court. On September 8, the state supreme court ruled in favor of the ballot initiative, and on the following day, a meeting of the Board of State Canvassers unanimously certified the initiative. The proposal was passed 57% to 43%, adding the right to abortion and contraceptive use to the Michigan constitution.

A 1931 law, Section 750.14, criminalized abortion except when the pregnant person's life was in danger, and the U.S. Supreme Court ruling in Dobbs v. Jackson Women's Health Organization would have allowed that law to go back into effect, but on September 7, 2022, a Michigan Court of Claims judge ruled that that law violated the Michigan Constitution.

The law was ruled null and voided due to the 2022 amendment, and it was formally repealed by statute on April 5, 2023.

=== Judicial history ===
The US Supreme Court's decision in 1973's Roe v. Wade ruling meant the state could no longer regulate abortion in the first trimester. However, the Supreme Court overturned Roe v. Wade in Dobbs v. Jackson Women's Health Organization, No. 19-1392, 597 U.S. ___ (2022) later in 2022.

On September 7, 2022, Judge Elizabeth Gleicher invalidated a law from 1931 that criminalized abortion in Michigan unless the mother's life was in danger. From the ruling:

“A law denying safe, routine medical care not only denies women of their ability to control their bodies and their lives — it denies them of their dignity... Michigan’s Constitution forbids this violation of due process.” it "...forces a pregnant woman to forgo her reproductive choices and to instead serve as `an involuntary vessel entitled to no more respect than other forms of collectively owned property,’”

Judge Gleicher had previously issued an injunction of the 1931 law in May 2022; the Michigan Court of Appeals later ruled that it only applied to state prosecutors, but not county prosecutors. Gleicher's September 2022 decision applies to both sets of prosecutors.

On June 25, 2024, a Michigan Court of Claims judge suspended Michigan's 24-hour waiting period, informed consent counseling law and ban on advanced practice clinicians performing abortions, stating that the laws were no longer enforceable under 2022 Michigan Proposal 3.

=== Clinic history ===
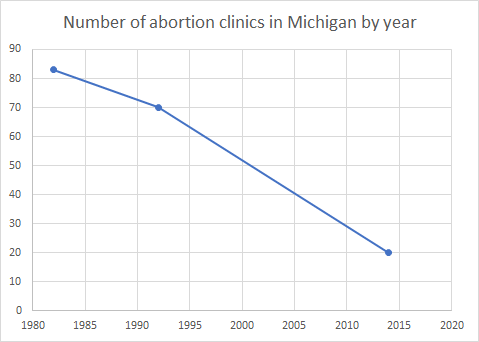
Number of abortion clinics in Michigan by year

Between 1982 and 1992, the number of abortion clinics in the state decreased by thirteen, going from 83 in 1982 to 70 in 1992. In 2014, there were twenty abortion clinics in the state. In 2014, 89% of the counties in the state did not have an abortion clinic. That year, 40% of women in the state aged 15–44 lived in a county without an abortion clinic. In March 2016, there were 21 Planned Parenthood clinics in the state. In 2017, there were 19 Planned Parenthood clinics, 8 of which offered abortion services, in a state with a population of 2,209,248 women aged 15–49. In 2025, Planned Parenthood of Michigan announced it would close 4 clinics because of funding cuts. In 2026, Planned Parenthood of Michigan announced it would close 3 clinics amid federal cuts.

== Amendment text ==
Right to Reproductive Freedom

(1) Every individual has a fundamental right to reproductive freedom, which entails the right to make and effectuate decisions about all matters relating to pregnancy, including but not limited to prenatal care, childbirth, postpartum care, contraception, sterilization, abortion care, miscarriage management, and infertility care.

An individual's right to reproductive freedom shall not be denied, burdened, nor infringed upon unless justified by a compelling state interest achieved by the least restrictive means.

Notwithstanding the above, the state may regulate the provision of abortion care after fetal viability, provided that in no circumstance shall the state prohibit an abortion that, in the professional judgment of an attending health care professional, is medically indicated to protect the life or physical or mental health of the pregnant individual.

(2) The state shall not discriminate in the protection or enforcement of this fundamental right.

(3) The state shall not penalize, prosecute, or otherwise take adverse action against an individual based on their actual, potential, perceived, or alleged pregnancy outcomes, including but not limited to miscarriage, stillbirth, or abortion. Nor shall the state penalize, prosecute, or otherwise take adverse action against someone for aiding or assisting a pregnant individual in exercising their right to reproductive freedom with their voluntary consent.

(4) For the purposes of this section:

A state interest is "compelling" only if it is for the limited purpose of protecting the health of an individual seeking care, consistent with accepted clinical standards of practice and evidence-based medicine, and does not infringe on that individual's autonomous decision-making. "Fetal viability" means: the point in pregnancy when, in the professional judgment of an attending health care professional and based on the particular facts of the case, there is a significant likelihood of the fetus's sustained survival outside the uterus without the application of extraordinary medical measures.

(5) This section shall be self-executing. Any provision of this section held invalid shall be severable from the remaining portions of this section.

— Article 1, Section 28 of the Michigan Constitution.

== Statistics ==
Between 1893 and 1932, there were 156 indictments and 40 convictions of women for having abortions. In 1990, 1,157,000 women in the state faced the risk of an unintended pregnancy. In 2010, the state had seven publicly funded abortions, of which were seven federally funded and zero were state funded. In 2013, among white women aged 15–19, there were 1,460 abortions, 1,700 abortions for black women aged 15–19, 130 abortions for Hispanic women aged 15–19, and 90 abortions for women of all other races. In 2014, 54% of adults said in a poll by the Pew Research Center that abortion should be legal in all or most cases while 42% believe it should be illegal in all or most cases. The 2023 American Values Atlas reported that, in their most recent survey, 63% of people from Michigan said that abortion should be legal in all or most cases. In 2017, the state had an infant mortality rate of 6.8 deaths per 1,000 live births. In 2017, there were 1,777 dilation and evacuation procedures among the 26,594 total abortions performed in Michigan that year.

Number of reported abortions, abortion rate and percentage change in rate by geographic region and state in 1992, 1995 and 1996
| Census division and state | Number | | | Rate | | | % change 1992–1996 |
|---|---|---|---|---|---|---|---|
| Census division and state | 1992 | 1995 | 1996 | 1992 | 1995 | 1996 | % change 1992–1996 |
| East North Central | 204,810 | 185,800 | 190,050 | 20.7 | 18.9 | 19.3 | –7 |
| Illinois | 68,420 | 68,160 | 69,390 | 25.4 | 25.6 | 26.1 | 3 |
| Indiana | 15,840 | 14,030 | 14,850 | 12 | 10.6 | 11.2 | –7 |
| Michigan | 55,580 | 49,370 | 48,780 | 25.2 | 22.6 | 22.3 | –11 |
| Ohio | 49,520 | 40,940 | 42,870 | 19.5 | 16.2 | 17 | –13 |
| Wisconsin | 15,450 | 13,300 | 14,160 | 13.6 | 11.6 | 12.3 | –9 |

Number, rate, and ratio of reported abortions, by reporting area of residence and occurrence and by percentage of abortions obtained by out-of-state residents, US CDC estimates
| Location | Residence | | | Occurrence | | | % obtained by out-of-state residents | Year | Ref |
|---|---|---|---|---|---|---|---|---|---|
| Location | No. | Rate^ | Ratio^^ | No. | Rate^ | Ratio^^ | % obtained by out-of-state residents | Year | Ref |
| Michigan | 26,646 | 14.1 | 233 | 27,629 | 14.6 | 242 | 4.7 | 2014 | |
| Michigan | 26,283 | 14 | 232 | 27,151 | 14.4 | 240 | 4.2 | 2015 | |
| Michigan | 25,572 | 13.6 | 226 | 26,395 | 14.1 | 233 | 4.0 | 2016 | |
^number of abortions per 1,000 women aged 15–44; ^^number of abortions per 1,000 live births

== Illegal and unsafe abortion deaths ==
In the period between 1972 and 1974, the state had an illegal abortion mortality rate per million women aged 15–44 of between 0.1 and 0.9. In 2005, the Detroit News reported that a 16-year-old boy beat his pregnant, under-age girlfriend with a bat at her request to abort a fetus. The young couple lived in Michigan, where parental consent is required to receive an abortion.

== Pro-abortion rights activities and views ==
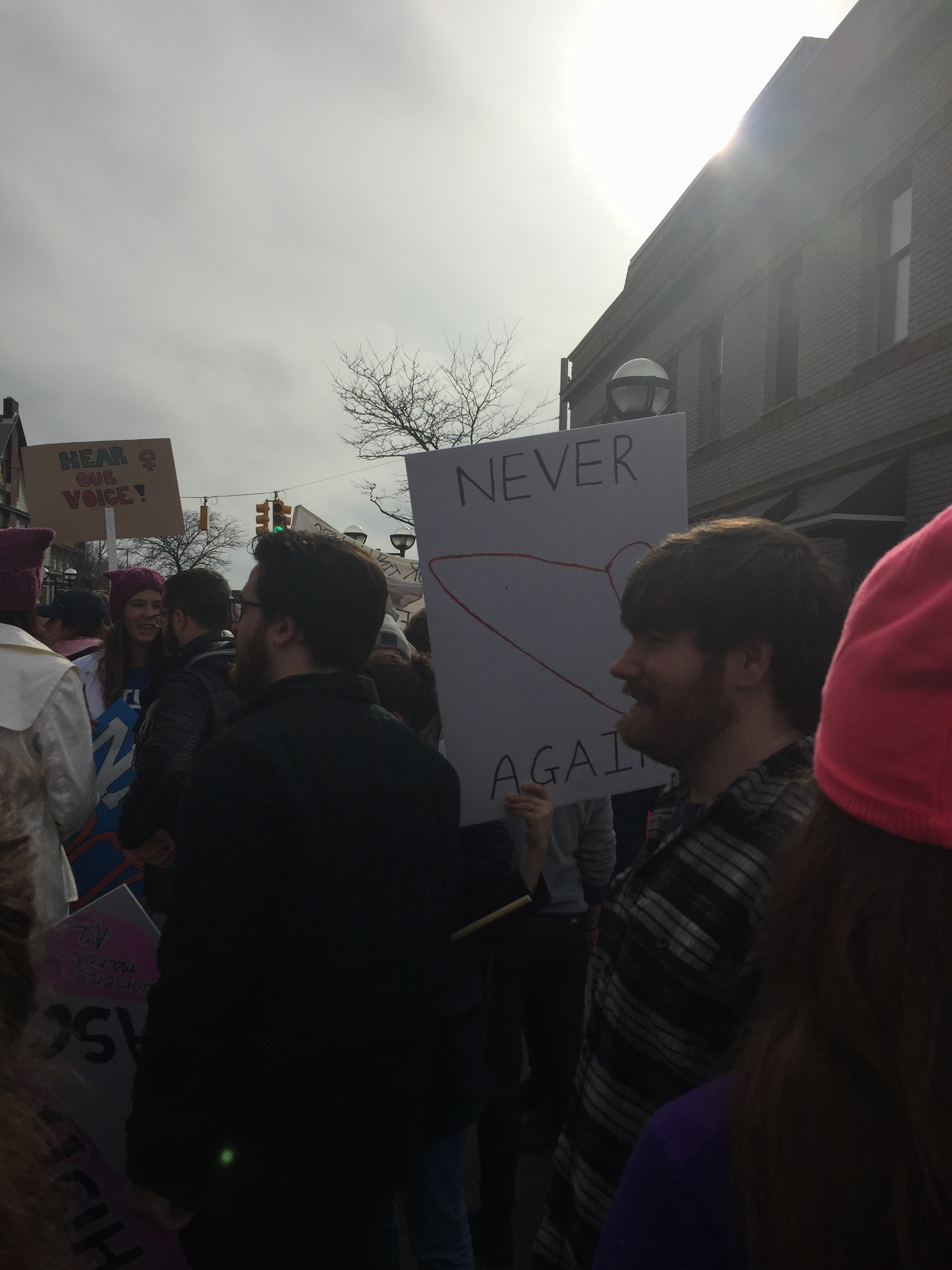
Ann Arbor Women's March in 2017

=== Views ===
Sen. Winnie Brinks (D-Grand Rapids) said during a hearing on the 2019 proposed abortion legislation, "Nearly 99% of abortions occur before 21 weeks, but when they are needed later in pregnancy, it is often in very complex circumstances, the kinds of situations where a woman and her doctor need every medical option available. [...] In fact, abortions later in pregnancy often involve rare, severe fetal abnormalities, and serious risks to women's health." Sen. Erika Geiss (D-Taylor) said during the same debate, "I can stand here and call out the hypocrisy of predominantly male legislators — most of whom, with zero medical background — who somehow decided when they took office that they are medical experts and experts of women's bodies and health care."

=== Protests ===
Women from the state participated in marches supporting abortion rights as part of a #StoptheBans movement in May 2019.

Following the overturn of Roe v. Wade on June 24, 2022, abortion rights protests took place in Ann Arbor and Detroit with Click on Detroit counting nearly 1,000 participants. Around 200 abortion rights protestors demonstrated at the Michigan State Capitol in Lansing. Abortion rights protests were also held in Grand Rapids and Kalamazoo.

On July 11, 2022, Reproductive Freedom For All submitted 753,759 signatures for their petition to get a proposed abortion rights amendment on the ballot in the November 2022 general election.

=== Violence ===
A 74-year-old man shot an 84-year-old woman on September 20, 2022. She was campaigning against Michigan's Proposition 3 which sought to make abortion a constitutional right in the state of Michigan. She survived and she received medical treatment for her wound after driving to a nearby police department. The man claimed he accidentally shot her. Prosecutors from Ionia County later charged him on September 30 with one count of felonious assault, careless discharge of a gun causing injury and reckless use of a firearm. He has been released on $10,000 bond.

The pro-abortion militant group Jane's Revenge has accepted responsibility for acts of vandalism aimed at anti-abortion crisis pregnancy centers. The organization has been linked with vandalization on the building which hosts Jackson Right to Life and the office of Congressman Tim Walberg. Other acts of vandalism in Michigan have been suspected to have the involvement of Jane's Revenge, such as vandalization of the Lennon Pregnancy Center in Dearborn Heights on June 23, 2022, the pregnancy center Pregnancy Aid Detroit in Eastpointe on December 19, 2022, as well as the home of one of the board members the same day.

== Anti-abortion activities and views ==
=== Views ===
The Democrats for Life of America are a group of anti-abortion Democrats on the political left who advocate for an anti-abortion plank in the Democratic Party's platform and for anti-abortion Democratic candidates. Former vice-presidential candidate Sargent Shriver, the late Robert Casey, a former two-term governor of Pennsylvania, and former Rep. Bart Stupak (D-Mich), a former leader of the bipartisan anti-abortion caucus in the United States House of Representatives, have been among the most well-known anti-abortion Democrats. However, following his vote in favor of the Patient Protection and Affordable Care Act, Marjorie Dannenfelser of the SBA List reported that her organization was revoking an anti-abortion award it had been planning to give to Stupak, and anti-abortion organizations accused Stupak of having betrayed the anti-abortion movement.

=== Violence ===
There was an arson attack at an abortion clinic in 1981 in Michigan that caused US$57,000 in damage.

On September 11, 2006, David McMenemy of Rochester Hills, Michigan, crashed his car into the Edgerton Women's Care Center in Davenport, Iowa. He then doused the lobby in gasoline and started a fire. McMenemy committed these acts in the belief that the center was performing abortions; however, Edgerton is not an abortion clinic. Time magazine listed the incident in a "Top 10 Inept Terrorist Plots" list.

On July 31, 2022, an anti-abortion protester set a Planned Parenthood building on fire in Kalamazoo, Michigan. A suspect was charged with arson of an organization receiving federal funding. According to investigators the suspect posted videos on YouTube railing against abortion and other topics. After pleading guilty to arson the man was sentenced to 5 years in prison.
