= Milo Radulovich =

American Air Force lieutenant

Milo Radulovich in 1996

Milo John Radulovich (October 28, 1926 – November 19, 2007) was an American reserve Air Force lieutenant who was accused of being a security risk for maintaining a "close and continuing relationship" with his father and sister, in violation of Air Force regulation 35-62 as his family members were accused of Communist sympathies. His case was publicized nationally by Edward Murrow on October 20, 1953, on Murrow's program, See It Now:

That [Air Force regulation 35-62] is a regulation which states that 'A man may be regarded as a security risk if he has close and continuing associations with communists or people believed to have communist sympathies.' Lieutenant Radulovich was asked to resign in August. He declined. A board was called and heard his case. At the end, it was recommended that he be severed from the Air Force., although it was also stated that there was no question whatever as to the lieutenant's loyalty.

— Edward R. Murrow

== Biography ==
He was born on October 28, 1926, in Detroit, Michigan, of ethnic Serb parentage from Yugoslavia.

In 1953, Radulovich, a lieutenant in the Air Force Reserve in Dexter, Michigan, was discharged because his father and sister were accused of being communists or communist sympathizers. It is believed that the basis of this determination was that his father, a Yugoslav immigrant, kept up on events in his homeland by subscribing to a number of Serbian newspapers. One of these papers was associated with the American Slav Congress, which had been labeled as Communist by the American government. His sister, Margaret Radulovich, was a supporter of liberal causes, but she maintained that she was "apolitical." Evidence against the lieutenant or his family was not shared with Radulovich or his attorney.

Radulovich demanded an Air Force hearing, aided by retired lawyer Charles Lockwood, who worked pro bono. Lockwood contacted an editor at the Detroit News, which ran a story about the situation. Among the readers was a former classmate of Radulovich, attorney Kenneth Sanborn. He also was an Air Force lieutenant and also waived fees for his services. Radulovich was granted a hearing at which a sealed manila envelope supposedly containing evidence against him was brandished and waved by the attorney for the Air Force. The envelope was never opened and neither board members nor Radulovich's defence were permitted to see its contents.

The Air Force stripped Radulovich of his commission, which came to the attention of Edward R. Murrow, host of the popular See It Now program on CBS. For months, Murrow, producer Fred Friendly and the See It Now team had debated how to address Joseph McCarthy's witch hunt, until the Radulovich affair. A crew went to Dexter and filmed impassioned interviews with the lieutenant and his family. Lockwood also appeared, and declared on national television "In my 32 years of practicing ... I have never witnessed such a farce and travesty upon justice as this thing has developed into."

The program aired on October 20, 1953. The image of the lieutenant and his immigrant father brought the impact of McCarthyite tactics to public awareness. Radulovich was reinstated one month after the broadcast.

Radulovich moved to California where, despite his reinstatement, he had trouble getting work. He was hired by a private weather forecasting business, and later worked for the National Weather Service. He was the Meteorologist In Charge of the Weather Service Office in Lansing, Michigan, when he retired in 1994.

Michael Ranville wrote a book about Radulovich's trial, To Strike at a King: The Turning Point in the McCarthy Witch-Hunt. The CBS broadcast and background to its airing were dramatized in the 1986 made-for-TV movie Murrow, the 2005 film Good Night, and Good Luck, and the 2025 live Broadway production of Good Night, and Good Luck (play) and its CNN livestream. Mr. Radulovich himself is interviewed in the "special features" segment on the Good Night, and Good Luck DVD released on March 14, 2006.

After experiencing two strokes and other more minor medical conditions, Radulovich died on November 19, 2007, in Vallejo, California.

== Legacy ==
In 2008, The Board of Regents of the University of Michigan approved a posthumous Bachelor of Science degree with a concentration in physics for Radulovich. His case is recognized by the State Bar of Michigan as one of its "Michigan Legal Milestones."
