= Lawton, Michigan =

- Village
- Seal

- Location of Lawton, Michigan
- Coordinates: 42°10′2″N 85°50′47″W
- Country: United States
- State: Michigan
- County: Van Buren

Area
  - Total: 2.32 sq mi (6.02 km^{2})
  - Land: 2.29 sq mi (5.93 km^{2})
  - Water: 0.035 sq mi (0.09 km^{2})
- Elevation: 791 ft (241 m)

Population (2020)
  - Total: 1,850
  - Density: 807.7/sq mi (311.87/km^{2})
- Time zone: UTC-5 (Eastern (EST))
  - Summer (DST): UTC-4 (EDT)
- ZIP code: 49065
- Area code: 269
- FIPS code: 26-46500
- GNIS feature ID: 0630224
- Website: www.lawtonmi.org

Lawton is a village in southeastern Van Buren County, Michigan, United States. As of the 2020 census, Lawton had a population of 1,850.

== History ==
The Village of Lawton came into existence in 1848. Nathan Lawton who the village is named after, was from Waterford, New York and had purchased property when it became available when Michigan received statehood. Upon the railroad reaching here in 1848, Mr. Lawton donated several acres of land for the construction of a depot that was originally named Paw Paw Station. In 1851 when a post office was being established the name of the town was named for Mr. Lawton. Though Nathan Lawton never lived here two of his sons, George and Charles moved here and made this town their home. Around 1860 a few local men including both of the Lawton brothers began experimenting with growing grapes. In 1868 A.B. Jones delivered the first grapes that were taken to market in Lansing, MI. From there the grape industry took off and is now one of Southwest Michigan's largest industries with several wineries in the area as well as a Welch Grape Juice Factory located in Lawton that has been part of Lawton since 1919.

== Geography ==
According to the United States Census Bureau, the village has a total area of 2.36 square miles (6.11 km^{2}), of which 2.32 square miles (6.01 km^{2}) is land and 0.04 square miles (0.10 km^{2}) is water.

== Demographics ==
Historical population
Census	Pop.	Note	%±
1860	426		—
1870	1,081		153.8%
1880	747		−30.9%
1890	788		5.5%
1900	942		19.5%
1910	1,042		10.6%
1920	1,073		3.0%
1930	1,154		7.5%
1940	1,134		−1.7%
1950	1,206		6.3%
1960	1,402		16.3%
1970	1,358		−3.1%
1980	1,558		14.7%
1990	1,685		8.2%
2000	1,859		10.3%
2010	1,900		2.2%
2020	1,850		−2.6%
U.S. Decennial Census

=== 2020 census ===
As of the 2020 census, Lawton had a population of 1,850. The median age was 39.0 years. 22.4% of residents were under the age of 18 and 21.2% of residents were 65 years of age or older. For every 100 females there were 91.9 males, and for every 100 females age 18 and over there were 85.4 males age 18 and over.

0.0% of residents lived in urban areas, while 100.0% lived in rural areas.

There were 711 households in Lawton, of which 31.5% had children under the age of 18 living in them. Of all households, 39.4% were married-couple households, 19.5% were households with a male householder and no spouse or partner present, and 33.3% were households with a female householder and no spouse or partner present. About 33.6% of all households were made up of individuals and 17.2% had someone living alone who was 65 years of age or older.

There were 764 housing units, of which 6.9% were vacant. The homeowner vacancy rate was 1.7% and the rental vacancy rate was 6.7%.

Racial composition as of the 2020 census
Race	Number	Percent
White	1,572	85.0%
Black or African American	34	1.8%
American Indian and Alaska Native	13	0.7%
Asian	5	0.3%
Native Hawaiian and Other Pacific Islander	1	0.1%
Some other race	88	4.8%
Two or more races	137	7.4%
Hispanic or Latino (of any race)	199	10.8%

=== 2010 census ===
As of the census of 2010, there were 1,900 people, 730 households, and 457 families living in the village. The population density was 819.0 inhabitants per square mile (316.2/km^{2}). There were 788 housing units at an average density of 339.7 per square mile (131.2/km^{2}). The racial makeup of the village was 91.0% White, 0.7% African American, 0.9% Native American, 0.1% Asian, 5.6% from other races, and 1.7% from two or more races. Hispanic or Latino of any race were 9.8% of the population.

There were 730 households, of which 35.2% had children under the age of 18 living with them, 40.8% were married couples living together, 16.4% had a female householder with no husband present, 5.3% had a male householder with no wife present, and 37.4% were non-families. 32.5% of all households were made up of individuals, and 18.6% had someone living alone who was 65 years of age or older. The average household size was 2.45 and the average family size was 3.07.

The median age in the village was 38.9 years. 25.4% of residents were under the age of 18; 7.6% were between the ages of 18 and 24; 24.5% were from 25 to 44; 23.1% were from 45 to 64; and 19.2% were 65 years of age or older. The gender makeup of the village was 45.1% male and 54.9% female.

=== 2000 census ===
As of the census of 2000, there were 1,859 people, 610 households, and 428 families living in the village. The population density was 823.0 inhabitants per square mile (317.8/km^{2}). There were 668 housing units at an average density of 295.7 per square mile (114.2/km^{2}). The racial makeup of the village was 90.75% White, 1.24% African-American, 0.75% Native American, 0.05% Asian, 3.98% from other races, and 3.23% from two or more races. 11.62% of the population were Hispanic or Latino of any race.

There were 610 households, out of which 38.4% had children under the age of 18 living with them, 50.7% were married couples living together, 15.6% had a female householder with no husband present, and 29.7% were non-families. 24.8% of all households were made up of individuals, and 10.8% had someone living alone who was 65 years of age or older. The average household size was 2.63 and the average family size was 3.12.

In the village, the population was spread out, with 27.2% under the age of 18, 7.1% from 18 to 24, 27.8% from 25 to 44, 18.1% from 45 to 64, and 19.8% who were 65 years of age or older. The median age was 37 years. For every 100 females, there were 83.9 males. For every 100 females age 18 and over, there were 77.0 males.

The median income for a household in the village was $36,250, and the median income for a family was $40,909. Males had a median income of $32,614 versus $25,208 for females. The per capita income for the village was $15,600. 11.5% of the population and 6.7% of families were below the poverty line. Out of the total population, 8.2% of those under the age of 18 and 16.7% of those 65 and older were living below the poverty line.

== Notable residents ==
- Henry Ford (1825–1894), Michigan state senator and Lawton village president (not to be confused with the industrialist Henry Ford)
- Charlie Maxwell Charles Richard Maxwell (1927–2024) was an American professional baseball outfielder who played 14 seasons in Major League Baseball
- W. Rae Young (October 30, 1915 – March 7, 2008) was one of the Bell Labs engineers that invented the cell phone.

== See also ==
- List of municipalities in Michigan
