= 2016 local electoral calendar =

Worldwide local elections held in 2016

This local electoral calendar for 2016 lists the subnational elections held in 2016. Referendums, retention elections, and national by-elections (special elections) are also included.

== January ==
- 1 January: Himachal Pradesh, District Councils, Township Councils and Village Councils (1st phase)
- 2 January: Nigeria, Zamfara, Local Government Councils and Chairmen
- 3 January: Himachal Pradesh, District Councils, Township Councils and Village Councils (2nd phase)
- 5 January: Himachal Pradesh, District Councils, Township Councils and Village Councils (3rd phase)
- 9 January: Nigeria, Bayelsa, Governor (revote) in Southern Ijaw)
- 10 January: India
  - Haryana, District Councils, Township Councils and Village Councils (1st phase)
  - Himachal Pradesh, Municipal Councils
- 11 January: India, Manipur, Municipal Councils and Town Councils
- 16 January: Nigeria, Niger, Local Government Councils and Chairmen
- 17 January:
  - India, Haryana, District Councils, Township Councils and Village Councils (2nd phase)
  - Mexico, Colima, Governor special election
- 18 January: Pakistan, NA-218, National Assembly by-election
- 24 January: India, Haryana, District Councils, Township Councils and Village Councils (3rd phase)
- 25 January: Bhutan, District Heads, District Agents, District Councillors, Block Heads, Block Deputies and Block Councils (1st round 1st phase)

== February ==
- 2 February: India, Telangana, Hyderabad Metropolitan Region, Greater Hyderabad Municipal Corporation
- 4 February: Bermuda, Devonshire North Central, House of Assembly by-election
- 7 February: Costa Rica, Mayors, Municipal Councils, District Councils and District Council Presidents
  - San José, Mayor, Deputy Mayors, Aldermen, Trustees and District Council
- 8 February: Rwanda, Cell Councils and Village Executive Committees
- 9 February: Rwanda, School and Business Community Representatives
- 12–13 February: Rwanda, Youth Councils
- 13 February: India, Karnataka, District Councils and Township Councils (1st phase)
- 16 February: United States, Milwaukee, Mayor and Common Council (1st round)
- 20 February:
  - India, Karnataka, District Councils and Township Councils (2nd phase)
  - Kuwait, Third District, National Assembly by-election
- 21 February: Comoros
  - Autonomous Island of Anjouan, Governor (1st round)
  - Autonomous Island of Grande Comore, Governor (1st round)
  - Autonomous Island of Mohéli, Governor (1st round)
- 22 February: Rwanda, District Councils
- 28 February:
  - Austria, Tyrol, Mayors and Municipal Councils
  - Hong Kong, New Territories East, Legislative Council by-election
  - Switzerland
    - Aargau, referendum
    - Basel-Stadt, referendums
    - Bern, referendum
    - Geneva, referendums
    - Jura, referendum
    - Lucerne, referendum
    - Neuchâtel, referendum
    - Schaffhausen, referendums
    - Schwyz, referendum
    - Solothurn, referendum
    - St. Gallen, Government (1st round) and Cantonal Council
    - Thurgau, Executive Council
    - Ticino, referendum
    - Uri, Executive Council, Landrat and referendum
    - Zürich, referendums

== March ==
- 1 March: United States, Arkansas, Supreme Court and Court of Appeals (1st round)
- 5 March: Zimbabwe, Mhondoro-Mubaira, House of Assembly by-election
- 6 March:
  - Germany, Hesse, County Councils, Mayors, Municipal Councils and Local Advisory Boards
    - Frankfurt, City Council and Borough Councils
  - Poland, senatorial constituency No. 59, Senate by-election
- 7 March: Kenya
  - Malindi, National Assembly by-election
  - Kericho, Senate by-election
- 9 March: Saint Helena, Ascension and Tristan da Cunha, Tristan da Cunha, Chief Islander and Island Council
- 12 March: Nigeria, Sokoto, Local Government Councils and Chairmen
- 13 March:
  - France, Aisne, Nord and Yvelines, National Assembly by-elections (1st round)
  - Germany
    - Baden-Württemberg, Parliament
    - Rhineland-Palatinate, Parliament
    - Saxony-Anhalt, Parliament
- 17 March: Pakistan, NA-153, National Assembly by-election
- 18 March: Guyana, Municipal Councils and Neighborhood Democratic Councils
- 19 March: Australia, Queensland, Referendum, Mayors, Regional Councils, City Councils, Aboriginal Shire Councils and Shire Councils
  - Brisbane, Lord Mayor and City Council
- 20 March:
  - France, Aisne, Nord and Yvelines, National Assembly by-elections (2nd round)
  - Kazakhstan, Regional Councils and City Councils
  - Laos, Provincial People's Councils
  - Switzerland
    - Schwyz, Executive Council and Cantonal Council
    - Vaud, referendum
  - Tanzania, Zanzibar, President, House of Representatives, District Councils, Town Councils and Municipal Council
- 22 March:
  - Bangladesh, Union Councils (1st phase)
  - Pakistan, NA-101, National Assembly by-election
- 23 March: Saint Helena, Ascension and Tristan da Cunha, Saint Helena, Legislative Council by-election
- 27 March:
  - Japan, Kumamoto, Governor
  - Kyrgyzstan, City Councils and Village Councils
  - Ukraine, Kryvyi Rih, Mayor (revote)
- 31 March: Bangladesh, Union Councils (2nd phase)

== April ==
- 3 April:
  - Abkhazia, District Assemblies and Sukhumi City Council
  - Ecuador, Las Golondrinas, Join Which Province referendum
- 4 April:
  - Canada, Saskatchewan, Legislative Assembly
  - India
    - Assam, Legislative Assembly (1st phase)
    - West Bengal, Legislative Assembly (1st phase-a)
- 5 April: United States
  - Anchorage, Assembly
  - Wisconsin, Supreme Court and Court of Appeals
    - Milwaukee, Mayor and Common Council (2nd round)
- 7 April: Pakistan, NA-245, National Assembly by-election
- 9 April: Nigeria, Federal Capital Territory, Local Government Councils and Chairmen
- 10 April:
  - Comoros
    - Autonomous Island of Anjouan, Governor (2nd round)
    - Autonomous Island of Grande Comore, Governor (2nd round)
    - Autonomous Island of Mohéli, Governor (2nd round)
  - Switzerland, Thurgau, Grand Council
- 11 April: India
  - Assam, Legislative Assembly (2nd phase)
  - West Bengal, Legislative Assembly (1st phase-b)
- 11–13 April: Sudan, Darfur, Administrative Status referendum
- 12 April: United States, Long Beach, City Council (1st round)
- 13 April: Nigeria, Federal Capital Territory, Local Government Councils and Chairmen (revotes)
- 16 April: Nigeria, Ondo, Local Government Councils and Chairmen
- 17 April:
  - France, Loire-Atlantique, National Assembly by-election (1st round)
  - India, West Bengal, Legislative Assembly (2nd phase)
- 19 April: Canada, Manitoba, Legislative Assembly
- 21 April: India, West Bengal, Legislative Assembly (3rd phase)
- 23 April: Bangladesh, Union Councils (3rd phase)
- 24 April:
  - France, Loire-Atlantique, National Assembly by-election (2nd round)
  - India, Bihar, District Councils, Township Councils and Village Councils (1st phase)
  - Japan, Hokkaido 5th district and Kyoto 3rd district, House of Representatives by-elections
  - Serbia, Municipal Assemblies
    - Vojvodina, Assembly
  - Switzerland
    - Appenzell Innerrhoden, Landsgemeinde
    - St. Gallen, Government (2nd round)
- 25 April: India, West Bengal, Legislative Assembly (4th phase)
- 28 April:
  - India, Bihar, District Councils, Township Councils and Village Councils (2nd phase)
  - Isle of Man, Local Authority Commissioners and Local Authority Councils
  - Pakistan, NA-267, National Assembly by-election
- 30 April: India, West Bengal, Legislative Assembly (5th phase)

== May ==
- 1 May: Switzerland, Glarus, Landsgemeinde
- 2 May: India, Bihar, District Councils, Township Councils and Village Councils (3rd phase)
- 5 May:
  - India, West Bengal, Legislative Assembly (6th phase)
  - United Kingdom, Local elections
    - Ogmore and Sheffield Brightside and Hillsborough, House of Commons by-elections
    - England, Metropolitan Borough Councils, Unitary Authorities, District Councils, Mayors and Police Commissioners
      - Birmingham, City Council
      - Bristol, Mayor and City Council
      - Greater London, Mayor and Assembly
      - Leeds, City Council
      - Liverpool, Mayor and City Council
      - Manchester, City Council
    - Northern Ireland, Assembly
    - Scotland, Parliament
    - Wales, National Assembly
      - Police Commissioners
- 6 May: India, Bihar, District Councils, Township Councils and Village Councils (4th phase)
- 7 May:
  - Australia, Tasmania, (Apsley and Elwick) Legislative Council
  - Bangladesh, Union Councils (4th phase)
  - Malaysia, Sarawak, Legislative Assembly
  - Singapore, Bukit Batok, Parliament by-election
  - United States, Arlington, City Council
- 8 May:
  - Italy, Trentino-Alto Adige/Südtirol, Mayors and Municipal Councils (1st round)
  - Lebanon, Mount Lebanon, Municipal Councils
    - Beirut City, Municipal Council
- 9 May:
  - Canada, New Brunswick, Mayors and Municipal Councils
  - Philippines, Governors, Provincial Councils, Mayors and Municipal Councils
    - Autonomous Region in Muslim Mindanao, Governor and Regional Assembly
- 10 May:
  - India, Bihar, District Councils, Township Councils and Village Councils (5th phase)
  - United States, West Virginia, Supreme Court of Appeals
- 11 May: Comoros, Autonomous Island of Anjouan, President (2nd round in 13 constituencies)
- 14 May: India, Bihar, District Councils, Township Councils and Village Councils (6th phase)
- 15 May:
  - Dominican Republic, Mayors and District Councils
  - Italy, Aosta Valley, Mayors and Municipal Councils
  - Lebanon, Beirut and Beqaa, Municipal Councils
- 16 May: India
  - Tura, House of the People by-election
  - Kerala, Legislative Assembly
  - Puducherry, Legislative Assembly
  - Tamil Nadu, Legislative Assembly
- 17 May: United States
  - Idaho, Supreme Court and Court of Appeals (1st round)
  - Portland, Mayor and City Commission (1st round)
- 18 May: India, Bihar, District Councils, Township Councils and Village Councils (7th phase)
- 22 May:
  - Burkina Faso, Municipal Councils
  - France, Bas-Rhin and Alpes Maritimes, National Assembly by-elections (1st round)
  - India
    - Bihar, District Councils, Township Councils and Village Councils (8th phase)
    - Haryana, Municipal Councils
  - Italy, Trentino-Alto Adige/Südtirol, Mayors and Municipal Councils (2nd round)
  - Lebanon
    - Jezzine, Parliament by-election
    - Nabatieh and South, Municipal Councils
  - Vietnam, Provincial People's Councils, District People's Councils and Communal People's Councils
- 24 May: United States, Georgia, Supreme Court and Court of Appeals
- 26 May: India, Bihar, District Councils, Township Councils and Village Councils (9th phase)
- 28 May: Bangladesh, Union Councils (5th phase)
- 29 May:
  - France, Bas-Rhin and Alpes Maritimes, National Assembly by-elections (2nd round)
  - Lebanon, Akkar and North, Municipal Councils
- 30 May: India, Bihar, District Councils, Township Councils and Village Councils (10th phase)

== June ==
- 3 June: Australia, Norfolk Island, Regional Council
- 4 June: Bangladesh, Union Councils (6th phase)
- 5 June:
  - France, Ain, National Assembly by-election (1st round)
  - Italy, Mayors and Municipal Councils (1st round)
    - Bologna, Mayor and City Council (1st round)
    - Milan, Mayor, City Council, Borough Presidents and Borough Councils (1st round)
    - Naples, Mayor and City Council (1st round)
    - Rome, Mayor and City Council (1st round)
    - Turin, Mayor and City Council (1st round)
  - Japan, Okinawa, Prefectural Assembly
  - Mexico, State elections
    - Aguascalientes, Governor, Congress, Mayors and Municipal Councils
    - Baja California, Congress, Mayors and Municipal Councils
    - Chihuahua, Governor, Congress, Mayors, Trustees and Municipal Councils
    - Durango, Governor, Congress, Mayors and Municipal Councils
    - Hidalgo, Governor, Congress, Mayors and Municipal Councils
    - Mexico City, Constituent Assembly
    - Oaxaca, Governor, Congress, Mayors and Municipal Councils
    - Puebla, Governor
    - Quintana Roo, Governor, Congress, Mayors, Trustees and Municipal Councils
    - Sinaloa, Governor, Congress, Mayors, Trustees and Municipal Councils
    - Tamaulipas, Governor, Congress, Mayors and Municipal Councils
    - Tlaxcala, Governor, Congress, Mayors and Municipal Councils
    - Veracruz, Governor and Congress
    - Zacatecas, Governor, Congress, Mayors and Municipal Councils
  - Romania, County Presidents, County Councils, Mayors, Local Councils, Sector Mayors and Sector Councils
  - Switzerland
    - Aargau, referendums
    - Basel-Landschaft, referendums
    - Basel-Stadt, referendums
    - Geneva, referendums
    - Jura, referendum
    - Nidwalden, referendum
    - Schwyz, referendums
    - St. Gallen, referendum
    - Thurgau, referendum
    - Ticino, referendums
    - Uri, referendums
    - Zürich, referendum
- 7 June:
  - Dominica, Soufrière, Parliamentary by-election
  - United States
    - Ohio's 8th congressional district, U.S. House of Representatives special election
    - Bakersfield, Mayor (1st round)
    - Fresno, Mayor and City Council (1st round)
    - Long Beach, City Council (2nd round)
    - Los Angeles County, Board of Supervisors (1st round)
    - Orange County, CA, Board of Supervisors (1st round)
    - Riverside County, Board of Supervisors (1st round)
    - Sacramento, Mayor and City Council
    - San Bernardino County, Board of Supervisors (1st round)
    - San Diego County, Board of Supervisors (1st round)
      - San Diego, Mayor, City Attorney, Boards of Education, City Council (1st round) and Referendums
    - Santa Clara County, Board of Supervisors
      - San Jose, City Council (1st round)
- 12 June: France, Ain, National Assembly by-election (2nd round)
- 16 June: United Kingdom, Tooting, House of Commons by-election
- 18 June: Malaysia, Kuala Kangsar and Sungai Besar, House of Representatives by-elections
- 19 June: Italy, Mayors and Municipal Councils (2nd round)
  - Bologna, Mayor and City Council (2nd round)
  - Milan, Mayor, City Council, Borough Presidents and Borough Councils (2nd round)
  - Naples, Mayor and City Council (2nd round)
  - Rome, Mayor and City Council (2nd round)
  - Turin, Mayor and City Council (2nd round)
- 26 June: France, Loire-Atlantique, Airport referendum
- 28 June: United States, Tulsa, Mayor and City Council (1st round)
- 29 June:
  - Mongolia, Ulaanbaatar, City Council
  - Tonga, District Councillors and Municipal Councillors
  - Vanuatu, Malo/Aore, Parliament by-election

== July ==
- 3 July: Switzerland, Schaffhausen, referendums
- 10 July: Japan, Kagoshima, Governor
- 14 July: Tonga, Vavaʻu 16, Parliament by-election
- 17 July: Ukraine, Volyn constituency 23, Dnipropetrovsk constituency 27, Ivano-Frankivsk constituency 85, Luhansk constituency 114, Poltava constituency 151, Kherson constituency 183 and Chernihiv constituency 206, Parliament by-elections
- 18 July: Bangladesh, Mymensingh-1 and Mymensingh-3, House of the Nation by-elections
- 21 July: Pakistan, Azad Kashmir, Legislative Assembly
- 30 July: Nigeria, Adamawa, Local Government Councils and Chairmen
- 31 July: Japan, Tokyo, Governor

== August ==
- 3 August: South Africa, District Councils, Metropolitan Councils and Local Councils
- 4 August: United States, Tennessee, Supreme Court, Court of Appeals and Court of Criminal Appeals retention elections
- 6 August: Nigeria, Adamawa, Local Government Councils and Chairmen (revotes)
- 11 August: Zambia, Mayors, District Councils, Council Chairs and Municipal Councils
- 13 August: United States, Honolulu, Mayor and City Council (1st round)
- 21 August: Turkmenistan, Regional Councils and District Councils
- 27 August: Australia, Northern Territory, Legislative Assembly
- 28 August: Switzerland, Schaffhausen, Executive Council
- 30 August: United States
  - Mesa, Mayor and City Council (1st round)
  - Miami-Dade County, Mayor (1st round) and County Commission
- 31 August: Pakistan, NA-63, National Assembly by-election

== September ==
- 1 September: Saint Helena, Ascension and Tristan da Cunha, Ascension Island, Council
- 4 September:
  - Cape Verde, Municipal Chambers and Municipal Assemblies
  - Germany, Mecklenburg-Vorpommern, Parliament
- 7 September:
  - Jersey, Saint Helier No. 1, Parliament by-election
  - Saint Helena, Ascension and Tristan da Cunha, Saint Helena, Legislative Council by-election
- 10 September: Australia, New South Wales, Local Councils
- 11 September: Germany, Lower Saxony, County Administrators, County Councils, Mayors, Municipal Councils and Local Councils (1st round)
  - Hanover Region, Assembly
    - Hanover, City Council and Borough Councils
- 18 September:
  - Germany, Berlin, House of Representatives
  - Russia, Federal Subject Heads, Federal Subject Legislatures, Municipal Heads, Municipal Councils, District Councils, Village Councils and Local referendums
    - Adygea, State Council
    - Altai Krai, Legislative Assembly
    - Amur Oblast, Legislative Assembly
    - Astrakhan Oblast, Duma
    - Chechnya, Head and Parliament
    - Chukotka Autonomous Okrug, Duma
    - Chuvashia, State Council
    - Dagestan, People's Assembly
    - Ingushetia, People's Assembly
    - Jewish Autonomous Oblast, Legislative Assembly
    - Kaliningrad Oblast, Duma
    - Kamchatka Krai, Legislative Assembly
    - Karelia (Republic), Legislative Assembly
    - Khanty-Mansi Autonomous Okrug, Duma
    - Kirov Oblast, Legislative Assembly
    - Komi Republic, Head special election
    - Krasnoyarsk Krai, Legislative Assembly
    - Kursk Oblast, Duma
    - Leningrad Oblast, Legislative Assembly
    - Lipetsk Oblast, Council of Deputies
    - Mordovia, State Assembly
    - Moscow Oblast, Duma
    - Murmansk Oblast, Duma
    - Nizhny Novgorod Oblast, Legislative Assembly
    - Novgorod Oblast, Duma
    - Omsk Oblast, Legislative Assembly
    - Orenburg Oblast, Legislative Assembly
    - Oryol Oblast, Council of People's Deputies
    - Perm Krai, Legislative Assembly
    - Primorsky Krai, Legislative Assembly
    - Pskov Oblast, Assembly of Deputies
    - Saint Petersburg, Legislative Assembly
    - Samara Oblast, Duma
    - Stavropol Krai, Duma
    - Sverdlovsk Oblast, Legislative Assembly
    - Tambov Oblast, Duma
    - Tomsk Oblast, Legislative Assembly
    - Tula Oblast, Governor
    - Tuva, Head
    - Tver Oblast, Governor and Legislative Assembly
    - Tyumen Oblast, Duma
    - Ulyanovsk Oblast, Governor
    - Vologda Oblast, Legislative Assembly
    - Zabaykalsky Krai, Governor special election
- 19 September: Pakistan, NA-162, National Assembly by-election
- 25 September:
  - Bosnia and Herzegovina, Republika Srpska, National Day referendum
  - Germany, Lower Saxony, Mayors (2nd round)
  - Spain
    - Basque Country, Parliament
    - Galicia, Parliament
  - Switzerland
    - Geneva, referendums
    - Lucerne, referendum
    - Neuchâtel, referendums
    - Nidwalden, referendum
    - Obwalden, referendum
    - Schaffhausen, Cantonal Council
    - Schwyz, referendums
    - St. Gallen, referendum
    - Ticino, referendums
    - Uri, referendums
    - Valais, referendums
    - Zug, referendums
    - Zürich, referendum
- 27 September: Bhutan, District Heads, District Agents, District Councillors, Block Heads, Block Deputies and Block Councils (1st round 2nd phase)
- 28 September: Nigeria, Edo, Governor

== October ==
- 1 October: Brazil, Paraná, Rio Grande do Sul and Santa Catarina, South Region Separatist referendum
- 2 October:
  - Bosnia and Herzegovina
    - Brčko District, Assembly
    - Federation of Bosnia and Herzegovina, Mayors and Municipal Councils
    - Republika Srpska, Mayors and Municipal Assemblies
  - Brazil, Mayors and Municipal Councils (1st round)
    - São Paulo, Mayor
- 7–8 October: Czech Republic, Regional Assemblies
- 8 October:
  - Georgia, Adjara, Supreme Council
  - New Zealand, Regional Councils, Mayors, Territorial Authority Councils and District Health Boards
    - Auckland, Mayor, Council and Local Boards
    - Wellington, Mayor and Council
  - Nigeria, Ogun, Local Government Councils and Chairmen
- 13 October: Cook Islands, Arutanga-Reureu-Nikaupara, Parliament by-election
- 15 October:
  - Australia, Australian Capital Territory, Legislative Assembly
  - Canada, Nova Scotia, Mayors and Municipal Councils
    - Halifax, Mayor, Regional Council and School Boards
- 16 October:
  - Japan, Niigata, Governor
  - Portugal, Azores, Legislative Assembly
- 19 October:
  - Guernsey, Vale, Parliament by-election
  - Mongolia, Provincial Assemblies, District Assemblies and Subdistrict Assemblies
- 20 October: United Kingdom, Batley and Spen and Witney, House of Commons by-elections
- 21 October: Bhutan, District Heads, District Agents, District Councillors, Block Heads, Block Deputies and Block Councils (2nd round)
- 22 October:
  - Australia, Victoria, Mayors, City Councils, Shire Councils and Borough Council
    - City of Melbourne, Lord Mayor and City Council
  - Zimbabwe, Norton, House of Assembly by-election
- 23 October:
  - Chile, Mayors and Municipal Councils
  - Japan
    - Fukuoka 6th district and Tokyo 10th district, House of Representatives by-elections
    - Okayama, Governor
    - Toyama, Governor
  - Switzerland
    - Aargau, Executive Council and Grand Council
    - Basel-Stadt, Executive Council (1st round) and Grand Council
- 24 October: Canada, Medicine Hat—Cardston—Warner, House of Commons by-election
- 26 October: Canada, Saskatchewan, Mayors and Municipal Councils
- 27 October – 7 November: Canada, Prince Edward Island, Electoral Reform referendum
- 29 October: East Timor, Village Chiefs and Community Chiefs (1st round)
- 30 October: Brazil, Mayors and Municipal Councils (2nd round)

== November ==
- 4 November: Bhutan, Thimphu, North Thimphu, National Assembly by-election
- 6 November: Switzerland, Fribourg, Council of State (1st round) and Grand Council
- 7 November: Canada, Yukon, Legislative Assembly
- 8 November:
  - Guam, Mayors and Vice-Mayors
  - Northern Mariana Islands, Municipal Councils and Boards of Education
  - Puerto Rico, Mayors and Municipal Legislatures
  - United States of America, Quadrennial elections
    - Hawaii's 1st congressional district, U.S. House of Representatives special election
    - Kentucky's 1st congressional district, U.S. House of Representatives special election
    - Pennsylvania's 2nd congressional district, U.S. House of Representatives special election
    - Washington, D.C., Council
    - Alabama
      - Board of Education and Public Service Commission
      - Supreme Court
      - Remove Age Restrictions for Government Officials, Right to Work, and Two-Thirds Supermajority for Impeachment constitutional referendums
    - Alaska
      - House of Representatives and Senate
      - Supreme Court and Court of Appeals retention elections
      - Automatic Voter Registration via Permanent Fund Dividend referendum
    - Arizona
      - Corporation Commission
      - House of Representatives and Senate
      - Supreme Court and Court of Appeals retention elections
      - Public Pension Reform constitutional referendum, and Marijuana Legalization and Minimum Wage/Sick Time referendums
      - Maricopa County, Board of Supervisors and Sheriff
        - Mesa, City Council (2nd round)
    - Arkansas
      - House of Representatives and Senate
      - Court of Appeals (2nd round)
      - Medical Marijuana referendum
    - California
      - Assembly and Senate
      - Corporate Political Spending, Criminal Sentences/Juvenile Prosecution, Firearms/Ammunition Regulations, Marijuana Legalization, Multilingual Education, Plastic Bag Ban, Repeal of Death Penalty and State Prescription Drug Purchase referendums
      - Bakersfield, Mayor (2nd round) and City Council
      - Fresno, Mayor and City Council (2nd round)
      - Los Angeles County, Board of Supervisors (2nd round)
      - Oakland, City Council
      - Orange County, Board of Supervisors (2nd round)
      - Riverside County, Board of Supervisors (2nd round)
      - San Bernardino County, Board of Supervisors (2nd round)
      - San Diego County, Board of Supervisors (2nd round)
        - San Diego, City Attorney, City Council (2nd round) and Referendums
      - San Francisco, Board of Supervisors
      - San Jose, City Council (2nd round)
    - Colorado
      - Board of Education
      - House of Representatives and Senate
      - Supreme Court and Court of Appeals retention elections
      - ColoradoCare, Minimum Wage and Requirements for Citizen-Initiated Amendments constitutional referendums, and Open Presidential Primaries, Physician-Assisted Suicide and Unaffiliated Electors in Primaries referendums
    - Connecticut
      - House of Representatives and Senate
    - Delaware
      - Governor, Lieutenant Governor and Insurance Commissioner
      - House of Representatives and Senate
    - Florida
      - House of Representatives and Senate
      - Supreme Court and District Courts of Appeal retention elections
      - Medical Marijuana and Solar Energy Choice constitutional referendums
      - Broward County, Commission
      - Miami-Dade County, Mayor (2nd round)
    - Georgia
      - Public Service Commission
      - House of Representatives and Senate
      - New Judicial Commission and State Intervention in Failing Schools constitutional referendums
    - Hawaii
      - Office of Hawaiian Affairs Board of Trustees
      - House of Representatives and Senate
      - Honolulu, Mayor and City Council (2nd round)
    - Idaho
      - House of Representatives and Senate
      - Supreme Court (2nd round)
      - Legislative Oversight of Administrative Rules constitutional referendum
    - Illinois
      - Comptroller special election
      - House of Representatives and Senate
      - Appellate Court retention elections, and Appellate Court
      - Cook County, Board of Review, Clerk of the Circuit Court, Recorder of Deeds, State's Attorney, Water Reclamation District Board, and Earned Sick Time and Eliminate the Recorder of Deeds referendums
    - Indiana
      - Governor, Attorney General and Superintendent of Public Instruction
      - House of Representatives and Senate
      - Court of Appeals retention elections
    - Iowa
      - House of Representatives and Senate
      - Supreme Court and Court of Appeals retention elections
    - Kansas
      - Board of Education
      - House of Representatives and Senate
      - Supreme Court and Court of Appeals retention elections
    - Kentucky
      - House of Representatives and Senate
      - Supreme Court
      - Louisville, Metropolitan Council
    - Louisiana
      - Public Service Commission
      - Supreme Court and Circuit Courts of Appeal
      - Authority of College Boards to Establish Tuition constitutional referendum
    - Maine
      - House of Representatives and Senate
      - Gun Background Checks, Marijuana Legalization, Minimum Wage and Ranked-Choice Voting referendums
    - Maryland
      - Court of Appeals and Court of Special Appeals retention elections
      - Political Party Affiliation Requirement to Fill Vacancies constitutional referendum
      - Baltimore, Mayor and City Council
    - Massachusetts
      - Governor's Council
      - House of Representatives and Senate
      - Charter School Expansion, Conditions for Farm Animals and Marijuana Legalization referendums
    - Michigan
      - Board of Education
      - House of Representatives
      - Supreme Court and Court of Appeals
      - Wayne County, Commission
    - Minnesota
      - House of Representatives and Senate
      - Supreme Court and Court of Appeals
    - Missouri
      - Governor, Lieutenant Governor, Attorney General, Secretary of State and Treasurer
      - House of Representatives and Senate
      - Supreme Court and Court of Appeals retention elections
      - Judicial Campaign Contribution Limits, Prohibition on Extending Sales Tax and Voter ID constitutional referendums
    - Montana
      - Governor, Attorney General, Auditor, Public Service Commission, Secretary of State and Superintendent of Public Instruction
      - House of Representatives and Senate
      - Supreme Court
      - Medical Marijuana referendum
    - Nebraska
      - Board of Education and Public Service Commission
      - Legislature
      - Supreme Court and Court of Appeals retention elections
      - Death Penalty referendum
    - Nevada
      - Assembly and Senate
      - Supreme Court and Court of Appeals
      - Gun Background Checks and Marijuana Legalization referendums
      - Clark County, County Commission
    - New Hampshire
      - Governor and Executive Council
      - House of Representatives and Senate
    - New Mexico
      - Public Education Commission and Public Regulation Commission, and Secretary of State special election
      - House of Representatives and Senate
      - Supreme Court and Court of Appeals retention elections, and Supreme Court and Court of Appeals
    - New York
      - Assembly and Senate
    - North Carolina
      - Governor, Lieutenant Governor, Agriculture Commissioner, Attorney General, Auditor, Insurance Commissioner, Labor Commissioner, Secretary of State, Superintendent of Public Instruction and Treasurer
      - House of Representatives and Senate
      - Supreme Court and Court of Appeals
    - North Dakota
      - Governor, Auditor, Insurance Commissioner, Public Service Commission, Superintendent of Public Instruction and Treasurer
      - House of Representatives and Senate
      - Supreme Court
      - Medical Marijuana referendum
    - Ohio
      - Board of Education
      - House of Representatives and Senate
      - Supreme Court and Courts of Appeal
    - Oklahoma
      - Corporation Commission
      - House of Representatives and Senate
      - Supreme Court, Court of Civil Appeals and Court of Criminal Appeals retention elections
      - Public Money for Religious Purposes constitutional referendum
      - Tulsa, City Council (2nd round)
    - Oregon
      - Governor special election, Attorney General, Secretary of State and Treasurer
      - House of Representatives and Senate
      - Supreme Court and Court of Appeals
      - Wildlife Trafficking Prevention referendum
      - Portland, City Commission (2nd round)
    - Pennsylvania
      - Attorney General, Auditor and Treasurer
      - House of Representatives and Senate
    - Rhode Island
      - House of Representatives and Senate
    - South Carolina
      - House of Representatives and Senate
    - South Dakota
      - Public Utilities Commission
      - House of Representatives and Senate
      - Establish Nonpartisan Elections, Governance of Technical Schools and Independent Redistricting Commission constitutional referendums, and Campaign Finance/Lobbying Laws, Decreased Youth Minimum Wage and Short-Term Loan Interest Rate Cap referendums
    - Tennessee
      - House of Representatives and Senate
    - Texas
      - Board of Education and Railroad Commissioner
      - House of Representatives and Senate
      - Supreme Court, Court of Criminal Appeals and Courts of Appeals
      - Austin, City Council (1st round)
      - Bexar County, Commissioners Court
      - Dallas County, Commissioners Court
      - Harris County, Commissioners Court
      - Tarrant County, Commissioners Court
    - Utah
      - Governor, Attorney General, Auditor, Board of Education and Treasurer
      - House of Representatives and Senate
    - Vermont
      - Governor, Lieutenant Governor, Attorney General, Auditor, Secretary of State and Treasurer
      - House of Representatives and Senate
    - Virginia
      - Right to Work constitutional referendum
      - Virginia Beach, Mayor and City Council
    - Washington
      - Governor, Lieutenant Governor, Attorney General, Auditor, Insurance Commissioner, Public Lands Commissioner, Secretary of State, Superintendent of Public Instruction and Treasurer
      - House of Representatives and Senate
      - Supreme Court and Court of Appeals
      - Carbon Emissions Tax, Democracy Credits, Individual Gun Access Prevention, Minimum Wage and Rights of Corporations referendums
    - West Virginia
      - Governor, Agriculture Commissioner, Attorney General, Auditor, Secretary of State and Treasurer
      - House of Delegates and Senate
    - Wisconsin
      - Assembly and Senate
    - Wyoming
      - House of Representatives and Senate
      - Supreme Court retention elections
    - American Samoa, Governor and House of Representatives
    - Guam, Auditor, Consolidated Commission on Utilities, Education Board, Legislature, and Superior Court retention election
    - Northern Mariana Islands, House of Representatives, Senate, and Supreme Court retention elections
    - Puerto Rico, Governor, House of Representatives and Senate
    - U.S. Virgin Islands, Board of Education, Board of Elections and Legislature
- 13 November: East Timor, Village Chiefs and Community Chiefs (2nd round)
- 19 November: India, Cooch Behar, Lakhimpur, Shahdol and Tamluk, House of the People by-elections
- 20 November:
  - Japan, Tochigi, Governor
  - Mali, Municipal Councils
  - Moldova, Gagauzia, People's Assembly (1st round)
- 26 November:
  - Guernsey, Alderney, President and Parliament
  - Nigeria, Ondo, Governor
- 27 November: Switzerland
  - Aargau, Executive Council (2nd round) and referendums
  - Basel-Landschaft, referendums
  - Basel-Stadt, Executive Council (2nd round)
  - Bern, referendum
  - Fribourg, Council of State (2nd round)
  - Geneva, referendums
  - Lucerne, referendum
  - Obwalden, referendums
  - Schaffhausen, referendum
  - Thurgau, referendum
  - Zug, referendum
  - Zürich, referendums
- 28 November:
  - India, Maharashtra, Municipal Councils and Town Councils (1st phase)
  - Jamaica, Mayors, Municipal Councils, Parish Mayors and Parish Councils
  - Pakistan, NA-258, National Assembly by-election
  - Trinidad and Tobago, Trinidad, Regional Councils and Municipal Councils

== December ==
- 1 December: United Kingdom, Richmond Park, House of Commons by-election
- 3 December: New Zealand, Mount Roskill, House of Representatives by-election
- 4 December: Moldova, Gagauzia, People's Assembly (2nd round)
- 8 December: United Kingdom, Sleaford and North Hykeham, House of Commons by-election
- 10 December:
  - Nigeria, Rivers, House of Representatives, Senate and House of Assembly (revote in 10 LGAs)
  - United States, Louisiana
    - U.S. Senate (2nd round)
    - Louisiana's 3rd congressional district, U.S. House of Representatives (2nd round)
    - Louisiana's 4th congressional district, U.S. House of Representatives (2nd round)
- 13 December: United States, Austin, City Council (2nd round)
- 14 December:
  - Guernsey, Sark, Parliament
  - India, Maharashtra, Municipal Councils and Town Councils (2nd phase)
- 15 December: India, Assam
  - Jorhat District, Thengal Kachari Autonomous Council
  - Lakhimpur District, Deori Autonomous Council
- 18 December:
  - Cyprus, Municipal Councils and Community Councils
  - India, Maharashtra, Municipal Councils and Town Councils (3rd phase)
- 20 December: Bermuda, Warwick South Central, House of Assembly by-election
- 21 December: Nigeria, Abia, Local Government Councils and Chairmen
- 22 December: Bangladesh, Narayanganj, Mayor and City Corporation
- 25 December:
  - Republic of Macedonia, Tearce, Parliament by-election
  - Oman, Municipal Councils
- 27 December: India, Gujarat, Village Councils

== See also ==
- 2016 United States ballot measures
