= 2016 Colorado elections =

A general election was held in the U.S. state of Colorado on November 8, 2016. In addition to the presidential election, several statewide and federal offices were up for election. State primaries were held on June 28, 2016, while the Democratic and Republican presidential caucuses took place in March 1 and April 9 respectively.

== Federal offices ==
=== President of the United States ===
Despite losing the election, Democratic nominee Hillary Clinton won the state of Colorado, defeating Republican Donald Trump by 5 percentage points.

=== U.S. Senate ===
Incumbent Democrat Michael Bennet won re-election to a second full term, defeating Republican Darryl Glenn.

=== U.S. House of Representatives ===
All seven seats from Colorado in the United States House of Representatives were up for election. Republicans maintained their 4-3 lead; no seat changed partisan control.

== State Board of Education ==
Three seats on the Colorado State Board of Education were up for election in 2016.

District	Party	Incumbent	Status	Party	Candidate	Votes	%
3	Republican	Joyce Rankin	running (Note: Appointed on August 8, 2015.)	Republican	Joyce Rankin	206,014	58.86%
3	Republican	Joyce Rankin	running	Democratic	Christine Pacheco-Koveleski	143,976	41.14%
5	Republican	Steve Durham	running (Note: Appointed on December 2, 2014.)	Republican	Steve Durham	231,972	67.10%
5	Republican	Steve Durham	running	Democratic	Jeffery Walker Sr.	113,753	32.90%
6	Republican	Debora Scheffel	running	Democratic	Rebecca McClellan	179,722	50.18%
6	Republican	Debora Scheffel	running	Republican	Debora Scheffel	178,462	49.82%

Source: Colorado Secretary of State

== CU Regents ==
Three seats on the University of Colorado Board of Regents were up for election in 2016.

District	Party	Incumbent	Status	Party	Candidate	Votes	%
1	Democratic	Michael Carrigan	term-limited	Democratic	Jack Kroll	283,236	99.78%
1	Democratic	Michael Carrigan	term-limited	Republican	Jennifer Qualteri	623	0.22%
4	Republican	Sue Sharkey	running	Republican	Sue Sharkey	234,964	64.56%
4	Republican	Sue Sharkey	running	Democratic	Bob Owens	128,973	35.44%

Source: Colorado Secretary of State

=== At-large seat ===
Incumbent Republican Steve Bosley was term-limited and therefore not eligible for re-election.

==== Candidates ====
- Heidi Ganahl (Republican), founder of pet care franchise Camp Bow Wow
- Alice Madden (Democratic), executive director of Getches-Wilkinson Center for Natural Resources

==== Results ====
Results by county Ganahl: 50–60%; 60–70%; 70–80%; 80–90%; Madden: 50–60%; 60–70%; 70–80%

As of 2026, Ganahl is the latest Republican to win a statewide office in Colorado.

2016 University of Colorado Board of Regents at-large election
Party	Candidate	Votes	%
Republican	Heidi Ganahl	1,293,651	51.11
Democratic	Alice Madden	1,237,693	48.89
Total votes		2,399,025	100
Republican hold			

== State legislature ==
=== State Senate ===
18 of the 35 seats in the Colorado State Senate were on the ballot. Republicans maintained their narrow 18-17 lead; both Democrats and Republicans flipped one seat each.

=== State House of Representatives ===
All 65 seats in the Colorado House of Representatives were up for election. Democrats increased their lead to 37-28, gaining three seats from Republicans.

== State Judiciary ==
=== Supreme Court ===
Only one justice on the Colorado Supreme Court faced retention in 2016.

==== Justice Hood retention ====
William Hood III was appointed by governor John Hickenlooper in 2013 to succeed outgoing Michael Bender.

Colorado Supreme Court Justice Hood retention election
Choice	Votes	%
For	1,534,597	70.98
Against	627,321	29.02
Total	2,161,918	100.00
Source: Colorado Secretary of State

=== Court of Appeals ===
Ten judges on the Colorado Court of Appeals faced retention in 2016.

2022 Colorado Court of Appeals retention elections
Judge Name	Appointer	Term begin	Preceded by	Results			
Judge Name	Appointer	Term begin	Preceded by	For	%	Against	%
Karen Ashby	John Hickenlooper (D)	2013	Janice Davidson	1,477,122	69.25	655,946	30.75
Michael Berger	John Hickenlooper (D)	2013	Russell Carparelli	1,455,076	68.91	656,357	31.09
Steve Bernard	Bill Owens (R)	2006	new seat	1,331,691	63.35	770,463	36.65
Stephanie Dunn	John Hickenlooper (D)	2012	Arthur Roy	1,496,920	71.10	608,391	28.90
David Furman	Bill Owens (R)	2005	Marsha Piccone	1,477,774	70.45	619,845	29.55
Robert Hawthorne	Bill Owens (R)	2004	Robert Kapelke	1,477,956	70.63	614,614	29.37
Jerry Jones	Bill Owens (R)	2006	new seat	1,273,005	60.87	818,385	39.13
Anthony Navarro	John Hickenlooper (D)	2013	Robert Russell	1,374,286	65.52	723,073	34.48
Gilbert Román	Bill Owens (R)	2005	Henry Nieto	1,488,156	71.04	606,544	28.96
Diana Terry	Bill Owens (R)	2006	new seat	1,401,050	67.06	688,338	32.94
Source: Colorado Secretary of State

Results by county

Judge Ashby retention results
For:
- 80–90%
- 70–80%
- 60–70%
- 50–60%

Judge Berger retention results
For:
- 80–90%
- 70–80%
- 60–70%
- 50–60%

Judge Bernard retention results
For:
- 70–80%
- 60–70%
- 50–60%
Against:
- 50–60%

Judge Dunn retention results
For:
- 80–90%
- 70–80%
- 60–70%
- 50–60%

Judge Furman retention results
For:
- 70–80%
- 60–70%
- 50–60%

Judge Hawthorne retention results
For:
- 70–80%
- 60–70%
- 50–60%

Judge Jones retention results
For:
- 70–80%
- 60–70%
- 50–60%
Against:
- 50–60%

Judge Navarro retention results
For:
- 70–80%
- 60–70%
- 50–60%
Against:
- 50–60%

Judge Román retention results
For:
- 70–80%
- 60–70%
- 50–60%

Judge Terry retention results
For:
- 70–80%
- 60–70%
- 50–60%

== Ballot measures ==
Nine statewide measures appeared on the ballot in 2016.

2016 Colorado ballot measures
Name	Description	Votes				Type
Name	Description	Yes	%	No	%	Type
Amendment T	Removes part of the state constitution that allows forced, unpaid labor by convicted criminals.	1,280,037	49.68	1,296,722	50.32	Legislatively referred constitutional amendment
Amendment U	Exempts possessory interests worth $6,000 or less from taxation.	1,103,593	43.85	1,412,923	56.15	Legislatively referred constitutional amendment
Amendment 69	Establishes ColoradoCare, a universal health care scheme in the state.	568,683	21.23	2,109,868	78.77	Citizen-initiated constitutional amendment
Amendment 70	Raises the minimum wage from $8.31 to $9.30 per hour in 2017 and then increases it by 90¢ each year until it reaches $12 in 2020.	1,517,903	55.36	1,224,189	44.64	Citizen-initiated constitutional amendment
Amendment 71	Requires initiative petitioners to gather signatures in all 35 state senate districts and imposes a 55% vote threshold for future constitutional amendments.	1,476,948	55.69	1,175,324	44.31	Citizen-initiated constitutional amendment
Amendment 72	Raises the tax on cigarettes by $1.75 per pack of 20.	1,286,851	46.94	1,454,342	53.06	Citizen-initiated constitutional amendment
Proposition 106	Legalizes assisted death among terminally ill patients.	1,765,786	64.87	956,263	35.13	Citizen-initiated state statute
Proposition 107	Restores presidential primary elections held before the end of March and makes them open in Colorado.	1,701,599	64.09	953,246	35.91	Citizen-initiated state statute
Proposition 108	Allows unaffiliated electors to vote in primary elections of a major political party without declaring an affiliation with that political party.	1,398,577	53.27	1,227,117	46.63	Citizen-initiated state statute
Source: Colorado Secretary of State

Results by county

Amendment T results by county
No:
- 70–80%
- 60–70%
- 50–60%
Yes:
- 60–70%
- 50–60%

Amendment U results by county
No:
- 70–80%
- 60–70%
- 50–60%
Yes:
- 50–60%

Amendment 69 results by county
No:
- >90%
- 80–90%
- 70–80%
- 60–70%
- 50–60%

Amendment 70 results by county
Yes:
- 70–80%
- 60–70%
- 50–60%
No:
- 70–80%
- 60–70%
- 50–60%

Amendment 71 results by county
Yes:
- 70–80%
- 60–70%
- 50–60%
No:
- 60–70%
- 50–60%

Amendment 72 results by county
No:
- 80–90%
- 70–80%
- 60–70%
- 50–60%
Yes:
- 60–70%
- 50–60%

Proposition 106 results by county
Yes:
- 80–90%
- 70–80%
- 60–70%
- 50–60%
No:
- 60–70%
- 50–60%

Proposition 107 results by county
Yes:
- 70–80%
- 60–70%
- 50–60%
No:
- 60–70%
- 50–60%

Proposition 108 results by county
Yes:
- 60–70%
- 50–60%
No:
- 70–80%
- 60–70%
- 50–60%
