= 2016 United States Virgin Islands general election =

The United States Virgin Islands general election was held on November 8, 2016. Voters chose the delegate to the United States House of Representatives and all fifteen seats in the Legislature of the Virgin Islands.

== Legislature of the Virgin Islands ==
All fifteen seats in the Legislature of the Virgin Islands were contested. Controversy erupted after allegations surfaced that a candidate for the St. Thomas-St. John District, Kevin Rodriquez lied about his residency. Rodriquez was barred from taking a seat in the Legislature of the Virgin Islands after a ruling from the Supreme Court of the Virgin Islands. A special election was called by the Governor of the United States Virgin Islands, Kenneth Mapp to be held on April 8, 2017.

Senator At Large
Candidate	Party	Votes	%
Brian A. Smith	Democratic Party	5,821	72.83
Write in		2,172	27.17
Total		7,993	100.00
Valid votes		20,803	99.22
Invalid/blank votes		164	0.78
Total votes		20,967	100.00
Registered voters/turnout		46,076	45.51

St. Thomas/St. John
Candidate	Party	Votes	%
Marvin A. Blyden	Democratic Party	6,492	11.40
Janette Millin Young	Democratic Party	5,317	9.34
Tregenza Roach	Independent	5,058	8.88
Myron D. Jackson	Democratic Party	4,450	7.82
Jean A. Forde	Democratic Party	4,244	7.45
Kevin A. Rodriguez	Democratic Party	4,134	7.26
Dwayne DeGraff	Independent	3,831	6.73
Janelle K. Sarauw	Independent	3,764	6.61
Justin Harrigan, Sr.	Democratic Party	3,579	6.29
Patrick Simeon Sprauve	Democratic Party	3,319	5.83
Alma Francis-Heyliger	Independent	2,746	4.82
Stephen "Smokey" Frett	Independent Citizens Movement	2,624	4.61
Wilma Marsh Monsanto	Independent	1,563	2.75
Albert F. Richardson	Independent	1,358	2.39
Bruce C. Flamon	Independent	1,290	2.27
Shirley M. Sadler	Independent	1,110	1.95
Maxwell A. Carty	Independent	1,033	1.81
Margaret Price	Independent	576	1.01
Write in		449	0.79
Total		56,937	100.00
Valid votes		10,844	99.43
Invalid/blank votes		62	0.57
Total votes		10,906	100.00
Registered voters/turnout		23,917	45.60

St. Croix
Candidate	Party	Votes	%
Kurt Vialet	Democratic Party	5,818	12.25
Novelle Francis	Democratic Party	5,256	11.07
Sammuel Sanes	Democratic Party	4,612	9.71
Alicia "Chucky" Hansen	Independent	4,612	9.71
Positive T. A. Nelson	Independent Citizens Movement	4,322	9.10
Nereida "Nellie" O'Reilly	Democratic Party	4,295	9.05
Neville James	Democratic Party	4,221	8.89
Kenneth L. Gittens	Democratic Party	4,130	8.70
Terrence D. Joseph	Democratic Party	2,868	6.04
Norman Jn Baptiste	Independent	1,772	3.73
Robert B. Moorhead	Republican Party	1,710	3.60
Patricia James	Independent	1,604	3.38
Danny Emmanuel	Independent	1,009	2.13
Duane Howell	Independent	792	1.67
Write in		460	0.97
Total		47,481	100.00
Valid votes		9,959	98.99
Invalid/blank votes		102	1.01
Total votes		10,061	100.00
Registered voters/turnout		22,159	45.40

== Delegate to the United States House of Representatives ==
2016 United States House of Representatives election in the United States Virgin Islands, at-large district
- November 8, 2016
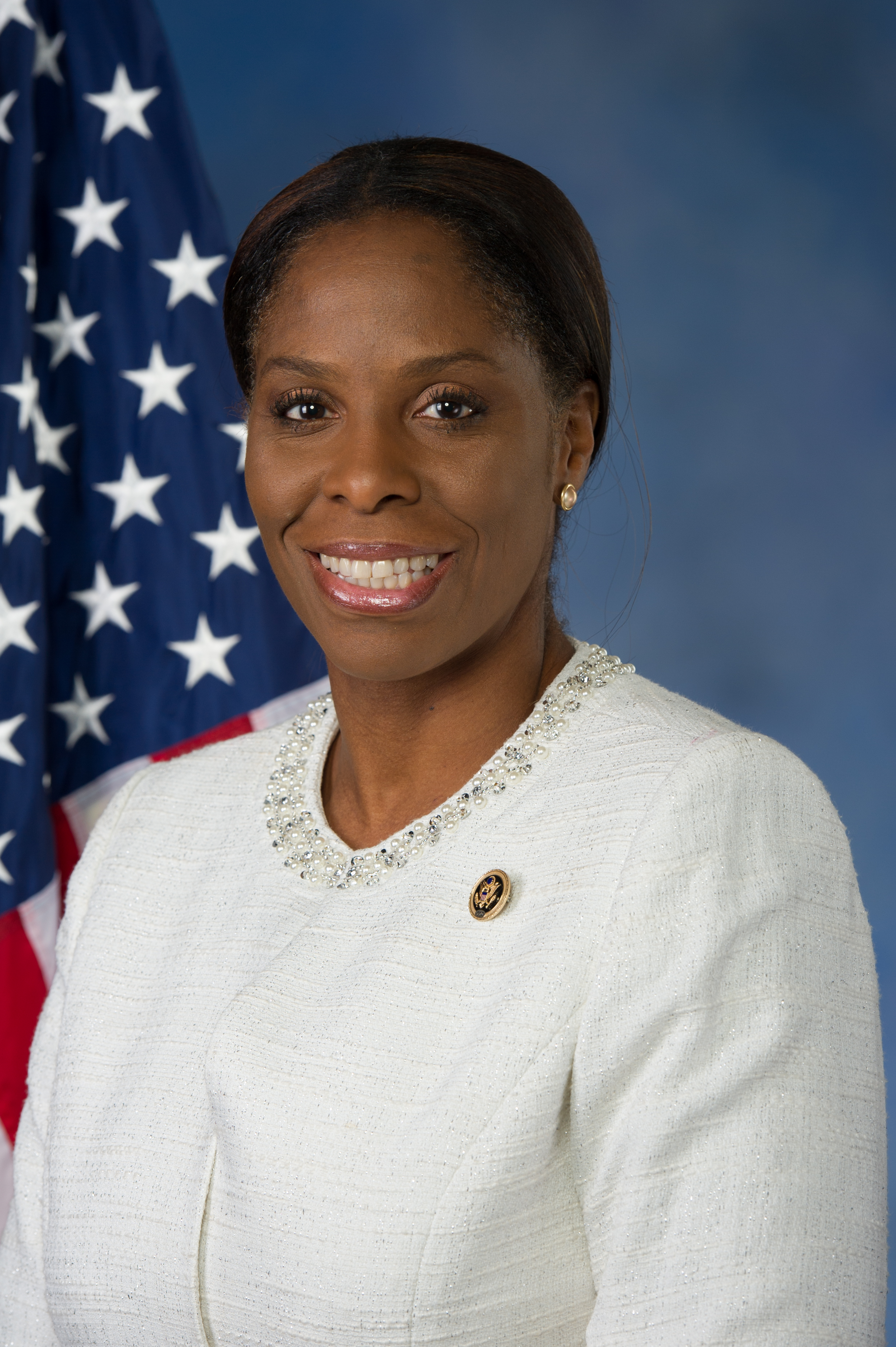
Candidate	Stacey Plaskett
Party	Democratic
Popular vote	14,531
Percentage	97.5%
Delegate at-large before election
Stacey Plaskett
Democratic
Elected Delegate at-large
Stacey Plaskett
Democratic

Incumbent Delegate Stacey Plaskett, a Democrat, sought re-election to her congressional seat. Her Republican opponent, Gordon Ackley, was kept off the ballot after election officials canceled the primary election.

Running without an opponent on the ballot, she won re-election with 97.51% of vote.

=== Democratic primary ===
Primary elections were held on August 6, 2016.

- Stacey Plaskett, incumbent Delegate
- Ronald E. Russell, former Virgin Islands Senator

Candidate	Votes	%
Stacey Plaskett	4,099	85.47
Ronald E. Russell	675	14.07
Write in	22	0.46
Total	4,796	100.00
Total votes	5,200	–
Registered voters/turnout	29,801	17.45

=== General election ===
Candidate	Party	Votes	%
Stacey Plaskett	Democratic Party	14,531	97.51
Write in		371	2.49
Total		14,902	100.00
Total votes		20,967	–
Registered voters/turnout		46,076	45.51
