= 2016 Portland, Oregon, City Commission election =

The 2020 Portland City Commission elections were held on May 17, 2016, and November 8, 2016.

2 positions were up for election, Position 1 and Position 4, respectively.

== Position 1 ==
Portland City Commission Position 1 election
- May 17, 2016
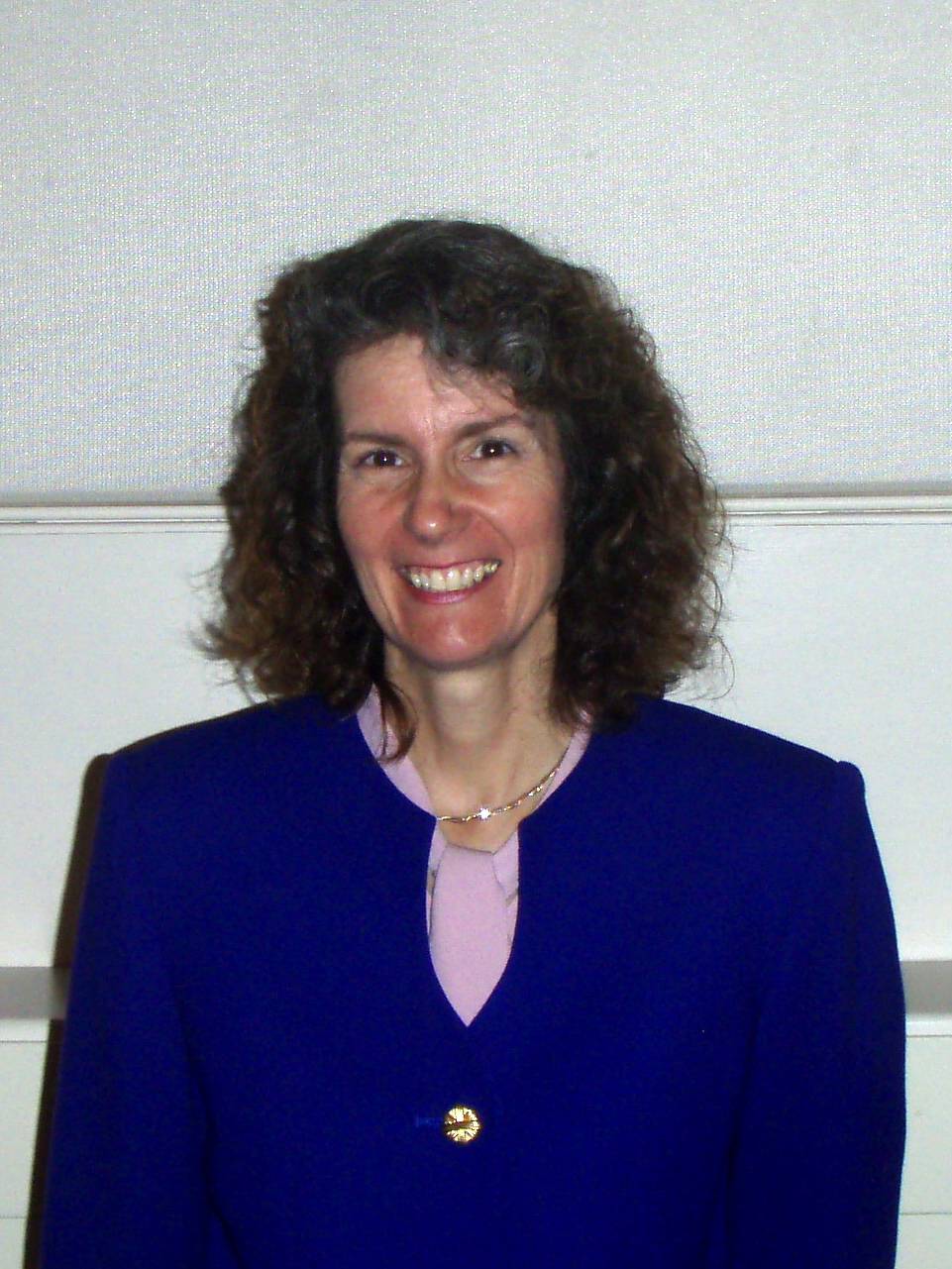

Candidate	Amanda Fritz	Ann Sanderson
Party	Nonpartisan	Nonpartisan
Popular vote	120,587	18,250
Percentage	69.35%	10.50%
City Commission before election
Amanda Fritz
Nonpartisan
Elected City Commission
Amanda Fritz
Nonpartisan

Incumbent Amanda Fritz won election with more than 50% of the vote, winning outright and avoiding a general election.

Primary election
Party	Candidate	Votes	%
Nonpartisan	Amanda Fritz	120,587	69.35%
Nonpartisan	Ann Sanderson	18,250	10.50%
Nonpartisan	Lanita Duke	16,271	9.36%
Nonpartisan	David Morrison	7,152	4.11%
Nonpartisan	Tabitha Ivan	5,807	3.34%
Nonpartisan	Sara Long	4,413	2.54%
Nonpartisan	Write-ins	1,399	0.80%
Total votes		173,879	100

== Position 4 ==
Portland City Commission Position 4 election
- May 17, 2016 & November 8, 2016
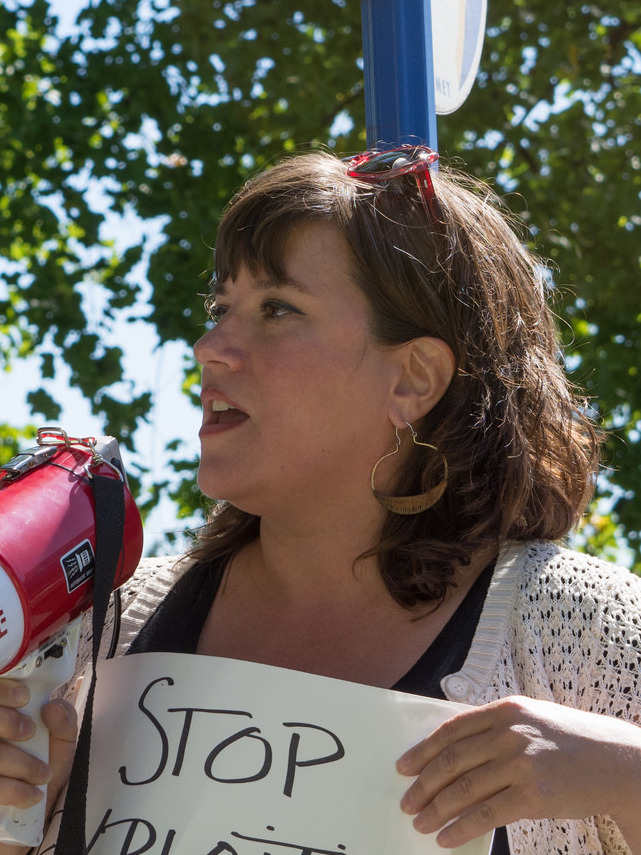

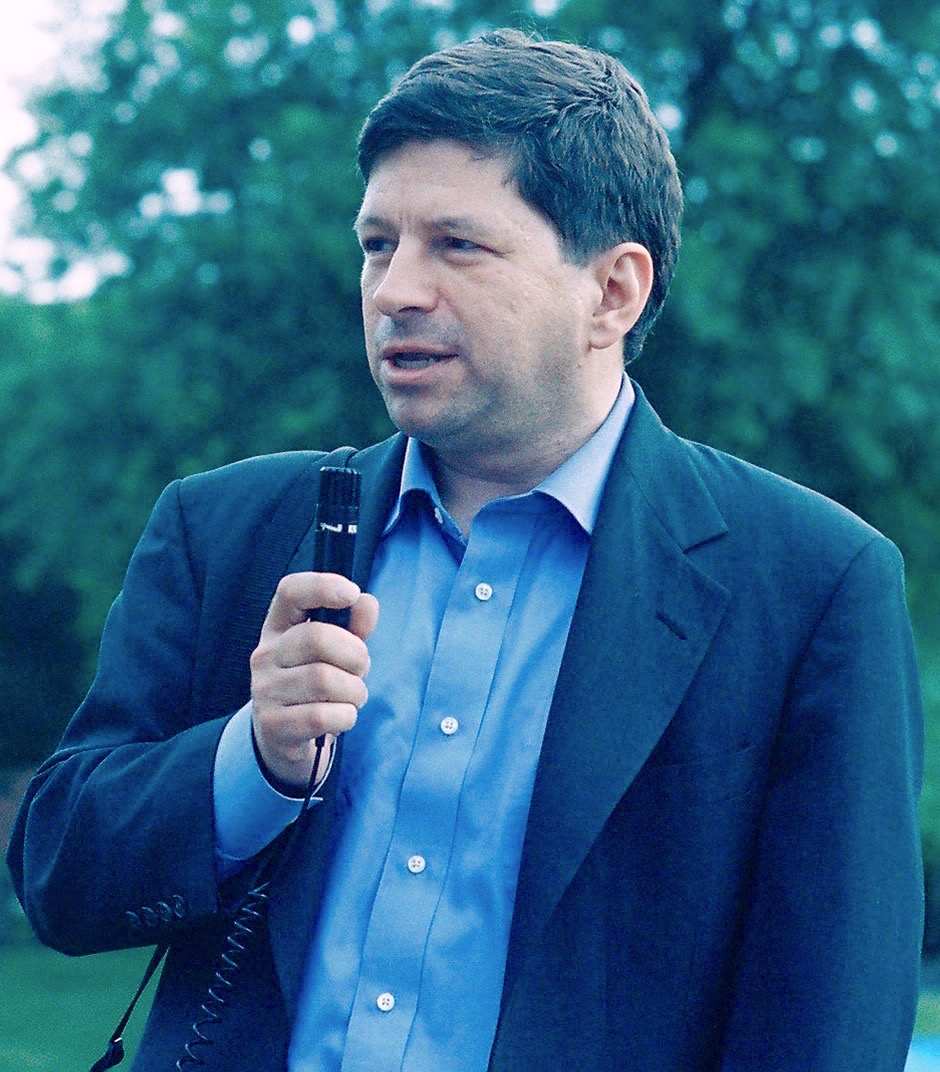
Candidate	Chloe Eudaly	Steve Novick
Party	Nonpartisan	Nonpartisan
Popular vote	142,261	116,764
Percentage	54.43%	44.67%
City Commission before election
Steve Novick
Nonpartisan
Elected City Commission
Chloe Eudaly
Nonpartisan

Incumbent Steve Novick won the primary election but was defeated by Chloe Eudaly in the general election.

Primary election
Party	Candidate	Votes	%
Nonpartisan	Steve Novick	72,370	42.69%
Nonpartisan	Chloe Eudaly	25,510	15.05%
Nonpartisan	Stuart Emmons	23,842	14.06%
Nonpartisan	Fred Stewart	13,880	8.19%
Nonpartisan	Suzanne Stahl	11,248	6.64%
Nonpartisan	Michael W. Durrow	8,538	5.04%
Nonpartisan	James Bernard Lee	4,204	2.48%
Nonpartisan	Leah Marie Dumas	4,065	2.40%
Nonpartisan	Shannon Estabrook	2,500	1.47%
Nonpartisan	Joseph Puckett	2,055	1.21%
Write-in		1,311	0.77%
Total votes		169,523	100.00%

Run-off election
Party	Candidate	Votes	%
Nonpartisan	Chloe Eudaly	142,261	54.43%
Nonpartisan	Steve Novick	116,764	44.67%
Nonpartisan	Write-ins	2,350	0.90%
Total votes		261,375	100%

== See also ==
- 2016 Portland, Oregon, mayoral election
