= Muhammad Kamal Malik =

Pakistani politician

Member of the National Assembly of Pakistan
- In office 9 May 2016 – 31 May 2018
- Constituency: NA-245 (Karachi-VII)

Personal details
- Born: Karachi, Sindh, Pakistan

Muhammad Kamal Malik (Urdu: محمد کمال ملک) is a Pakistani politician who had been a member of the National Assembly of Pakistan, from May 2016 to May 2018.

== Political career ==
He was elected to the National Assembly of Pakistan as a candidate of the Muttahida Qaumi Movement (MQM) from Constituency NA-245 (Karachi-VII) in by-election held in 2016. He received 39,597 votes and defeated Shahid Hussain, a candidate of Pakistan Peoples Party (PPP). The seat became vacant after Nabil Gabol who won it in the 2013 Pakistani general election vacated it after resigning from MQM.
