= 2016 Alabama elections =

A general election was held in the U.S. state of Alabama on November 8, 2016. Along with the presidential election, all of Alabama's seven seats in the United States House of Representatives, a United States Senate seat and several state-level and local offices were up for election. Primary elections took place on March 1, 2016.

== Federal offices ==
=== President of the United States ===
Republican candidate Donald Trump won Alabama with 62% of the vote and gained nine electoral votes.

=== United States Senate ===
Incumbent Republican Senator Richard Shelby won re-election to a sixth term in office with 63% of the vote.

=== United States House of Representatives ===
All of Alabama's seven seats in the United States House of Representatives were up for election in 2016. Six Republicans and one Democrat were re-elected. No districts changed partisan control.

== Public Service Commission ==
Incumbent Alabama Public Service Commission president Twinkle Andress Cavanaugh won re-election to a second term.

No Democrats filed to run for this race.

=== Republican primary ===
==== Candidates ====
- Twinkle Andress Cavanaugh, incumbent.
- Terry Dunn, former commissioner.

==== Primary results ====
Republican primary results
Party	Candidate	Votes	%
Republican	Twinkle Andress Cavanaugh (incumbent)	439,406	63.04%
Republican	Terry Dunn	257,652	36.96%
Total votes		697,058	100%

=== General election ===
2016 Alabama Public Service Commission election
Party	Candidate	Votes	%
Republican	Twinkle Andress Cavanaugh (incumbent)	1,372,948	97.21%
Write-in		39,407	2.79%
Total votes		1,412,355	100%

== State judiciary ==
Three seats on the Supreme Court of Alabama were up for election in 2016. Of these three only one seat was contested as justice Tom Parker faced a challenger in his bid for re-election.

=== Alabama Supreme Court, Parker seat ===
==== Republican primary ====
===== Candidates =====
- Tom Parker, incumbent.
- Donna Beaulieu, attorney.

===== Primary results =====
Republican primary results
Party	Candidate	Votes	%
Republican	Tom Parker (incumbent)	448,747	72.50%
Republican	Donna Beaulieu	170,194	27.50%
Total votes		618,941	100%

==== General election ====
2016 Alabama Supreme Court election
Party	Candidate	Votes	%
Republican	Tom Parker (incumbent)	1,375,534	97.52%
Write-in		34,961	2.48%
Total votes		1,410,495	100%

== Ballot measures ==
Fifteen statewide measures appeared on the ballot in Alabama - one in March and fourteen in November.

=== Summary ===
2016 Alabama ballot measures
Name	Description	Votes				Type
Name	Description	Yes	%	No	%	Type
Amendment 1 (March)	Changes retirement plans for state judicial officials.	680,092	62.84	402,240	37.16	Legislatively referred constitutional amendment
Amendment 1 (November)	Adds two members, elected at large, to the Auburn University Board of Trustees.	1,182,618	73.43	427,883	26.57	Legislatively referred constitutional amendment
Amendment 2	Prohibits reallocation of state park funds for other uses.	1,414,033	79.74	359,354	20.26	Legislatively referred constitutional amendment
Amendment 3	Changes the procedure for determining local constitutional amendments.	932,652	60.63	605,498	39.37	Legislatively referred constitutional amendment
Amendment 4	Authorizes county commissions to establish programs pertaining to the administration of their respective counties.	1,141,004	71.67	450,952	28.33	Legislatively referred constitutional amendment
Amendment 5	Rewords sections of the state constitution that address the state government's separation of powers.	922,670	59.99	615,275	40.01	Legislatively referred constitutional amendment
Amendment 6	Requires two-thirds vote in the Alabama Senate for conviction and impeachment of a state official.	788,399	53.59	682,889	46.41	Legislatively referred constitutional amendment
Amendment 7	Places employees of the Etowah County Sheriff's office under the authority of its Personnel Board.	704,567	59.38	482,042	40.62	Legislatively referred constitutional amendment
Amendment 8	Adds "right to work" to the state constitution.	1,119,034	69.61	488,515	30.39	Legislatively referred constitutional amendment
Amendment 9	Increases the maximum age allowed for candidates for the position of Judge of Probate in Pickens County.	600,579	51.05	575,882 (Note: Despite receiving >50% approval statewide, in Pickens County itself the amendment failed 48%–52%. As such, the amendment was rejected in accordance with Alabama state law. (Note: The law states that constitutional amendments addressing issues in a specific county must receive approval from the majority of voters in that county in addition to approval from the majority of voters statewide in order to pass.))	48.95	Legislatively referred constitutional amendment
Amendment 10	Makes any territory in Calhoun County subject to the police jurisdiction and planning jurisdiction of its respective municipality.	765,364	65.62	401,054	34.38	Legislatively referred constitutional amendment
Amendment 11	Confirms the Major 21st Century Manufacturing Zone Act, allowing Alabama cities to create specific zones to attract industry.	866,515	59.27	595,392	40.73	Legislatively referred constitutional amendment
Amendment 12	Establishes governing body to oversee toll roads and bridges within Baldwin County.	630,834	50.69	613,632 (Note: Despite receiving >50% approval statewide, in Baldwin County itself the amendment failed 48%–52%. As such, the amendment was rejected in accordance with Alabama state law.)	49.31	Legislatively referred constitutional amendment
Amendment 13	Removes age restrictions for government official positions, with the exception of judicial offices..	876,141	57.36	651,178	42.64	Legislatively referred constitutional amendment
Amendment 14	Guarantees the application of budget isolation resolutions to local laws passed by state legislature prior to November 8, 2016.	1,041,400	68.70	474,519	31.30	Legislatively referred constitutional amendment
Source: Alabama Secretary of State

Results by county

Amendment 1 (March) results by county
Yes:
- 80–90%
- 70–80%
- 60–70%
- 50–60%
No:
- 50–60%

Amendment 1 (November) results by county
Yes:
- 80–90%
- 70–80%
- 60–70%

Amendment 2 results by county
Yes:
- 80–90%
- 70–80%
- 60–70%

Amendment 3 results by county
Yes:
- 80–90%
- 60–70%
- 50–60%
No:
- 50–60%

Amendment 4 results by county
Yes:
- 80–90%
- 70–80%
- 60–70%
- 50–60%

Amendment 5 results by county
Yes:
- 80–90%
- 60–70%
- 50–60%
No:
- 50–60%

Amendment 6 results by county
Yes:
- 70–80%
- 60–70%
- 50–60%
No:
- 60–70%
- 50–60%

Amendment 7 results by county
Yes:
- 70–80%
- 60–70%
- 50–60%
No:
- 60–70%
- 50–60%
Tie:
- 50%

Amendment 8 results by county
Yes:
- 70–80%
- 60–70%
- 50–60%
No:
- 50–60%

Amendment 9 results by county
Yes:
- 50–60%
No:
- 60–70%
- 50–60%

Amendment 10 results by county
Yes:
- 70–80%
- 60–70%
- 50–60%
No:
- 60–70%

Amendment 11 results by county
Yes:
- 70–80%
- 60–70%
- 50–60%
No:
- 50–60%

Amendment 12 results by county
Yes:
- 60–70%
- 50–60%
No:
- 60–70%
- 50–60%

Amendment 13 results by county
Yes:
- 70–80%
- 60–70%
- 50–60%
No:
- 50–60%

Amendment 14 results by county
Yes:
- 80–90%
- 70–80%
- 60–70%
- 50–60%
