= 2016 Michigan elections =

2016 general elections in Michigan

- November 8, 2016

The 2016 Michigan elections were held in the U.S. state of Michigan on November 8, 2016.

There were voting machine failures on election day.

== Legislature ==
=== Senate district 4 special election ===
Virgil Smith Jr. was elected to represent Michigan's 4th Senate district in 2010 and 2014. Smith was arrested on May 10, 2015, for allegedly shooting at his ex-wife's SUV, riddling it with bullets and totaling it, and he was charged with multiple felonies. Two days later, Smith was removed from all of his committee posts, his leadership post, and removed from the Senate Democratic caucus.

On February 11, 2016, Smith agreed to plead guilty to malicious destruction of personal property $20,000 or more. Per his plea agreement, Smith will serve 10 months in the Wayne County Jail, resign from the state Senate and serve five years of probation where he will not be allowed to hold public office. At his March 14, 2016, sentencing, Wayne County Circuit Court Judge Lawrence Talon sentenced Smith but said it would be illegal for him to require Smith to resign from office or not hold office during his probation. Wayne County Prosecutor Kym Worthy said if Smith does not resign, her office would rescind Smith's plea agreement. At a hearing on March 28, 2016, Talon refused a request from the Wayne County Prosecutor's Office to rescind Smith's plea agreement and take the case to trial, seeing as he had yet resigned his Senate seat. Immediately after the hearing, Smith was taken into custody to begin serving his 10-month jail sentence. On March 31, 2016, Smith submitted his resignation to Michigan Senate majority leader Arlan Meekhof, effective April 12, 2016.

When Smith's resignation became official, Gov. Rick Snyder called a special election to fill the remaining portion of the term, with the special primary and general elections scheduled for August 2 and November 8, alongside Michigan's regularly scheduled primary and general elections.

4th Senate district special election, Democratic Primary
Party	Candidate	Votes	%	±%
Democratic	Ian Conyers	6,063	34.5	N/A
Democratic	Fred Durhal Jr.	4,480	25.5	N/A
Democratic	Patricia A. Holmes	1,362	7.8	N/A
Democratic	James Cole Jr.	1,327	7.6	N/A
Democratic	Carron L. Pinkins	1,103	6.3	N/A
Democratic	Vanessa Simpson Olive	773	4.4	N/A
Democratic	Ralph R. Rayner	602	3.4	N/A
Democratic	Howard Worthy	581	3.3	N/A
Majority		1,583	9.0	N/A
Turnout		17,563		

4th Senate district special election 2016
Party	Candidate	Votes	%	±%
Democratic	Ian Conyers	69,305	76.6	N/A
Republican	Keith Franklin	21,225	23.4	N/A

== Judiciary ==
2016 Michigan Supreme Court election
- November 8, 2016

2 seats of the Supreme Court of Michigan
	Majority party	Minority party
Party	Republican	Democratic
Last election	5	2
Seats won	2	0
Seats after	5	2
Seat change	Steady	Steady

=== Supreme Court ===
==== Associate Justice (Full term) ====
2016 Michigan Associate Justice election (Full term)
- November 8, 2016
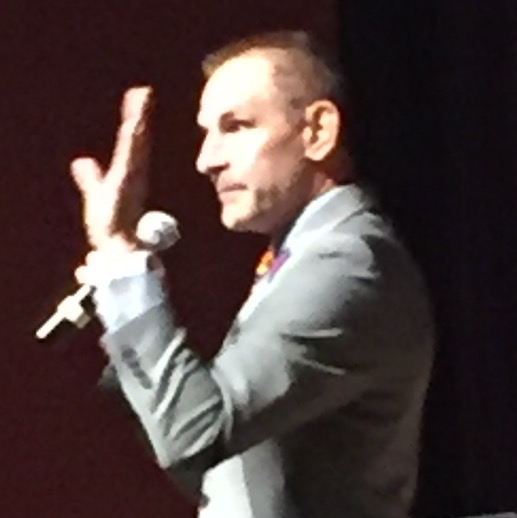
Candidate	David Viviano	Frank S. Szymanski
Party	Nonpartisan	Nonpartisan
Popular vote	2,316,459	792,944
Percentage	67.23%	23.01%
- County results Viviano: 50–60% 60–70% 70–80%
Justice before election
David Viviano
Elected Justice
David Viviano

===== Candidates =====
- Doug Dern (Natural Law)
- Frank S. Szymanski (Democratic), judge of the Wayne County Probate Court
- David Viviano (Republican), incumbent Associate Justice of the Supreme Court of Michigan

===== Results =====
2016 Michigan Supreme Court Associate Justice (Full term) election
Party	Candidate	Votes	%
Nonpartisan	David Viviano (incumbent)	2,316,459	67.23%
Nonpartisan	Frank S. Szymanski	792,944	23.01%
Nonpartisan	Doug Dern	336,160	9.76%
Total votes		3,445,563	100.0%
Republican hold			

==== Associate Justice (Term ending 01/01/2019) ====
2016 Michigan Supreme Court Associate Justice (Term ending 01/01/2019) election
- November 8, 2016
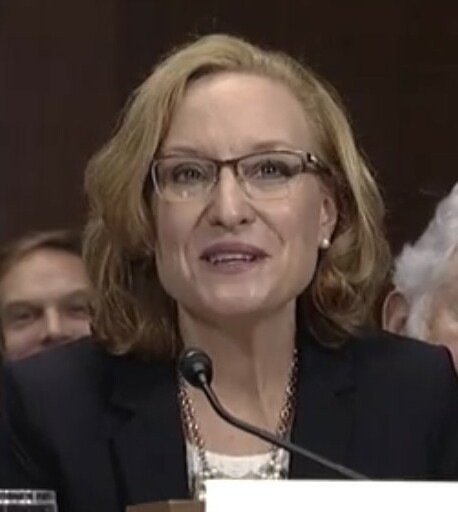
Candidate	Joan Larsen	Deborah Thomas
Party	Nonpartisan	Nonpartisan
Popular vote	1,940,260	984,107
Percentage	57.62%	29.23%
- County results Larsen: 40–50% 50–60% 60–70%
Justice before election
Joan Larsen
Elected Justice
Joan Larsen

===== Candidates =====
- Joan Larsen (Republican), incumbent Associate Justice of the Supreme Court of Michigan
- Kerry L. Morgan (Libertarian), counsel at Pentiuk, Couvreur & Kobiljak, P.C.
- Deborah Thomas (Democratic), judge of the Third Judicial Circuit Court of Michigan

===== Results =====
2016 Michigan Supreme Court Associate Justice (Term ending 01/01/2019) election
Party	Candidate	Votes	%
Nonpartisan	Joan Larsen (incumbent)	1,940,260	57.62%
Nonpartisan	Deborah Thomas	984,107	29.23%
Nonpartisan	Kerry L. Morgan	442,781	13.15%
Total votes		3,367,148	100.0%
Republican hold			
