= 2016 Los Angeles County Board of Supervisors election =

2016 Los Angeles County Board of Supervisors elections

3 of the 5 seats of the Los Angeles County Board of Supervisors
	Majority party	Minority party
Party	Democratic	Republican
Seats before	3	2
Seats won	1	1
Seats after	4	1
Seat change	▲1	▼1
- Results of the elections: Democratic gain Democratic hold Republican hold No election

The 2016 Los Angeles County Board of Supervisors elections were held on June 7, 2016. Three of the five seats (for the Second, Fourth, and Fifth Districts) of the Los Angeles County Board of Supervisors were contested in this election. A run-off election was held for the Fourth and Fifth Districts on November 8, 2016, as no single candidate failed to reach a majority vote.

Michael D. Antonovich and Don Knabe, incumbent Supervisors for the Fourth and Fifth Districts respectively, were termed out.

== Results ==
=== Second District ===
2016 Los Angeles County Board of Supervisors election District 2

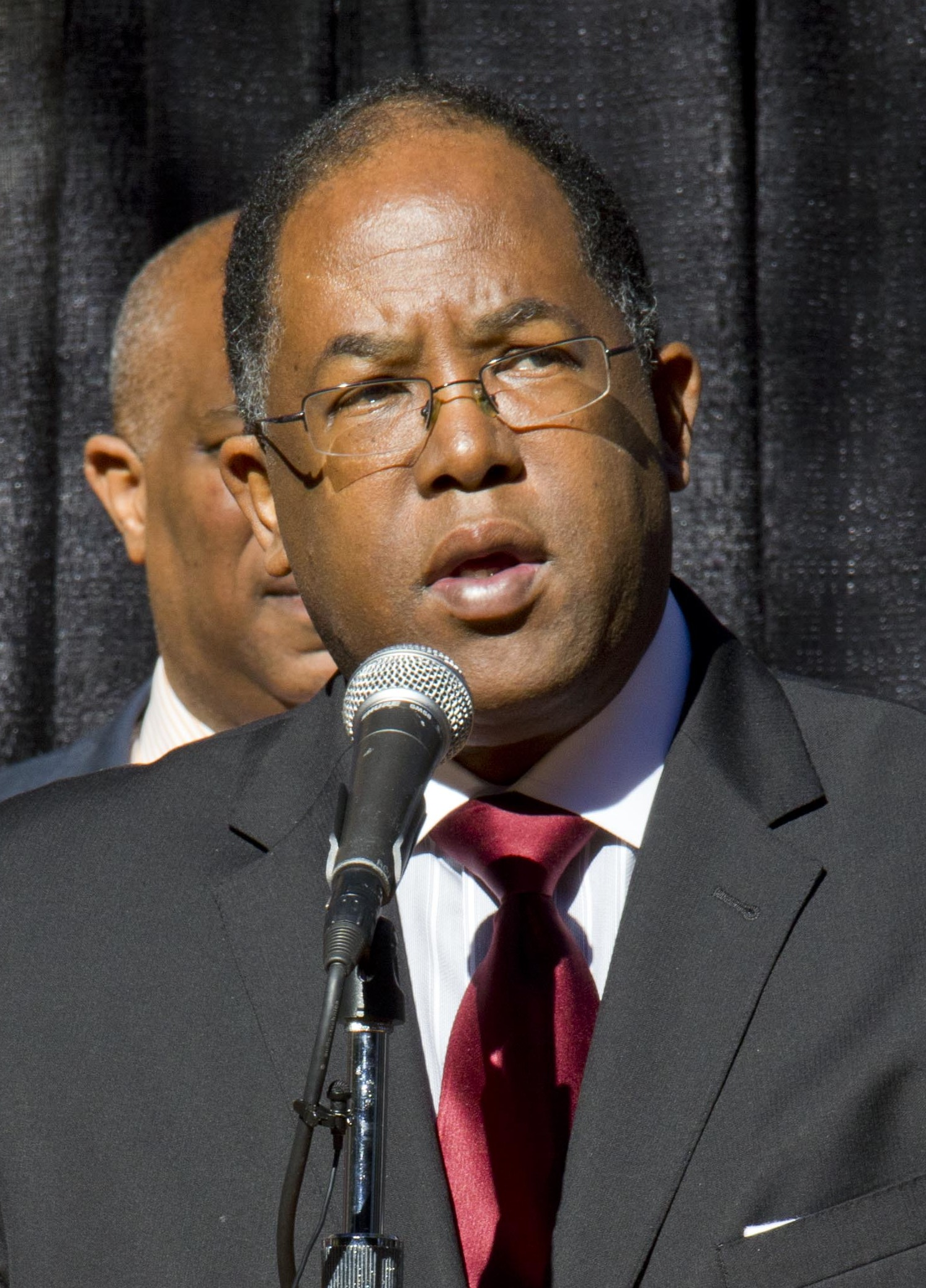
Candidate	Mark Ridley-Thomas
Popular vote	237,100
Percentage	100.00%
Supervisor before election
Mark Ridley-Thomas
Supervisor
Mark Ridley-Thomas

1st District supervisorial election, 2016
Candidate	Votes	%
Mark Ridley-Thomas	237,100	100
Turnout	{{{votes}}}	26.01%
Total votes	237,100	100.00

=== Fourth District ===
==== June 7, 2016 election ====
2016 Los Angeles County Board of Supervisors election District 4

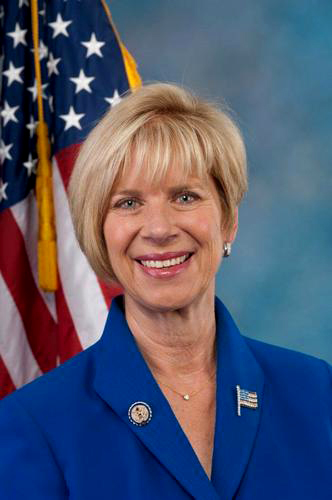

Candidate	Janice Hahn	Steve Napolitano	Ralph Pacheco
Popular vote	166,298	129,313	57,256
Percentage	47.13%	36.65%	16.23%
Supervisor before election
Don Knabe
Supervisor
Janice Hahn

4th District supervisorial election, 2016
Candidate	Votes	%
Janice Hahn	166,298	47.13
Steve Napolitano	129,313	36.65
Ralph Pacheco	57,256	16.23
Turnout	{{{votes}}}	34.10%
Total votes	352,867	100.00

==== November 8, 2016 run-off election ====
4th District supervisorial election, 2016
Candidate	Votes	%
Janice Hahn	355,530	56.33
Steve Napolitano	275,571	43.67
Turnout	{{{votes}}}	58.04%
Total votes	631,101	100.00

=== Fifth District ===
==== June 7, 2016 election ====
2016 Los Angeles County Board of Supervisors election District 5

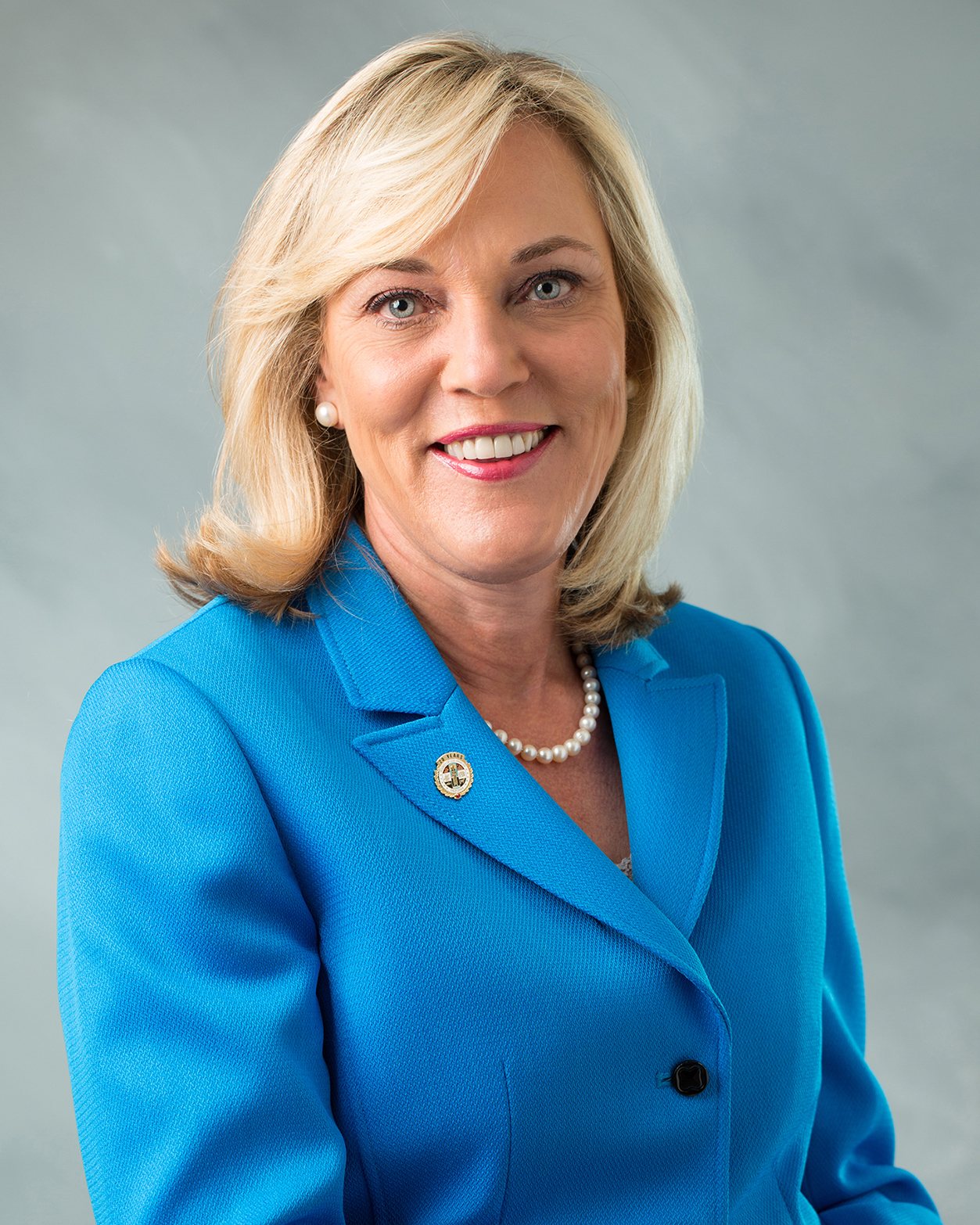

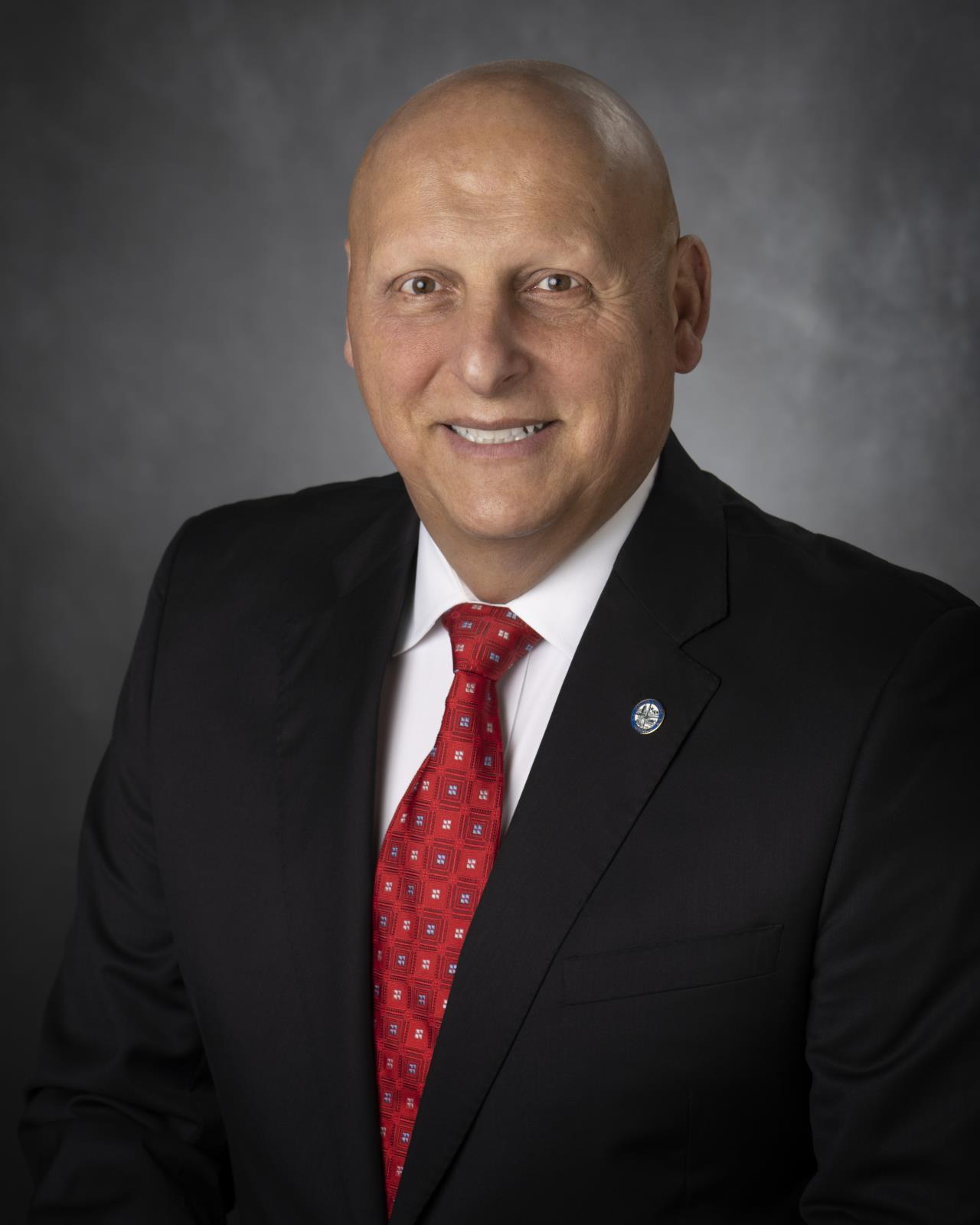

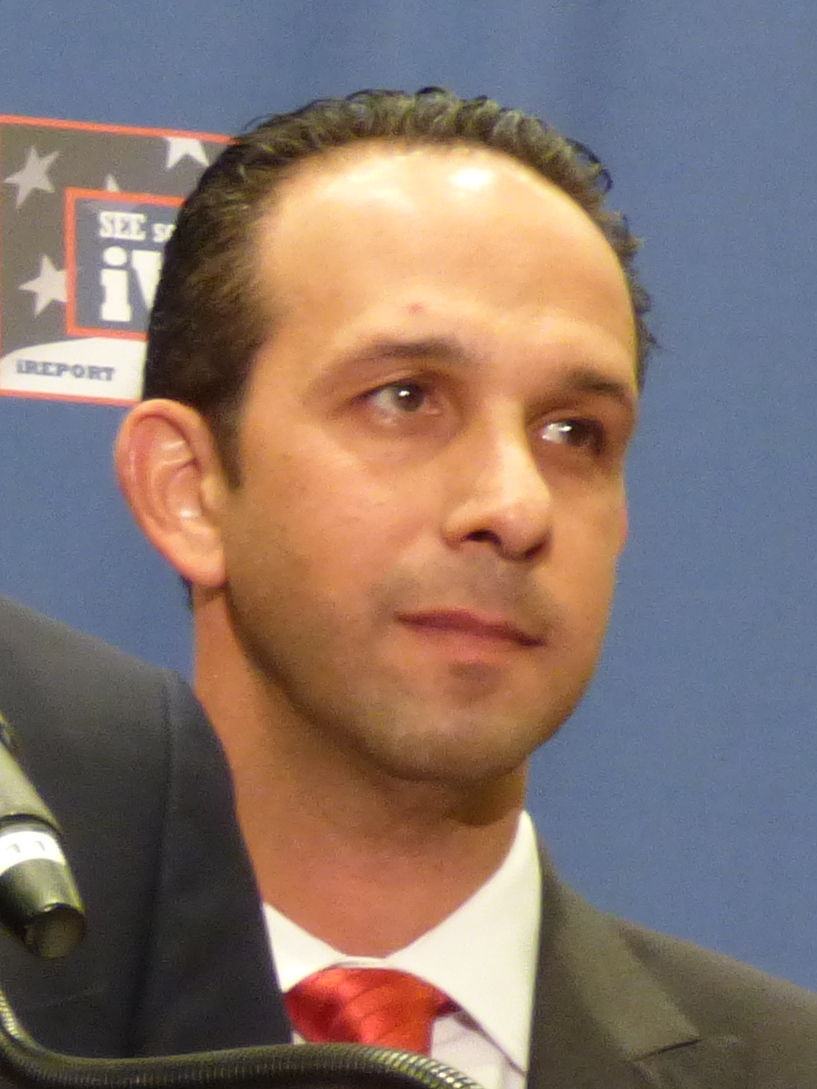

Candidate	Kathryn Barger	Darrell Park	Bob Huff
Popular vote	105,520	55,185	52,359
Percentage	29.64%	15.50%	14.71%
Candidate	Ara James Najarian	Mitchell Englander	Elan Carr
Popular vote	46,587	42,823	40,580
Percentage	13.08%	12.03	11.40
Supervisor before election
Michael D. Antonovich
Supervisor
Kathryn Barger

5th District supervisorial election, 2016
Candidate	Votes	%
Kathryn Barger	105,520	29.64
Darrell Park	55,185	15.50
Bob Huff	52,359	14.71
Ara James Najarian	46,587	13.08
Mitchell Englander	42,823	12.03
Elan Carr	40,580	11.40
Billy Malone	8,701	2.44
Rajpal Kahlon	4,285	1.20
Turnout	{{{votes}}}	34.24%
Total votes	356,040	100.00

==== November 8, 2016 run-off election ====
5th District supervisorial election, 2016
Candidate	Votes	%
Kathryn Barger	350,998	57.90
Darrell Park	255,165	42.10
Turnout	{{{votes}}}	55.44%
Total votes	606,163	100.00
