= 2016 San Diego City Attorney election =

- November 8, 2016
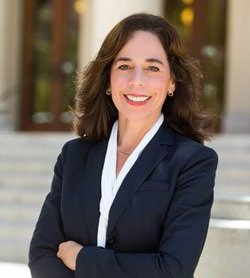
Nominee	Mara Elliott	Robert Hickey
Party	Democratic	Republican
Popular vote	267,122	198,735
Percentage	57.3%	42.7%
City Attorney before election
Jan Goldsmith
Republican
Elected City Attorney
Mara Elliott
Democratic

The 2016 San Diego City Attorney election occurred on Tuesday, November 8, 2016. The primary election was held on Tuesday, June 7, 2016.

Municipal elections in California are officially non-partisan, although most members do identify a party preference. A two-round system was used for the election, starting with a primary in June followed by a runoff in November between the top-two candidates.

== Campaign ==
The incumbent City Attorney Jan Goldsmith, was ineligible to run for reelection after eight years in the position due to term limits. Four Democrats and one Republican contested the race.

In the June primary, Republican Robert Hickey and Democrat Mara Elliott received the most votes and advanced to the November runoff election. Elliott's second-place victory in the June primary was considered an upset due to her opponents out raising and out spending her. Unlike her opponents, Elliott did not receive many of the typical endorsements from the various local democratic groups.

In the November runoff, Elliott defeated Hickey by a margin of 57 to 42 and was elected City Attorney.

== Results ==
2016 San Diego City Attorney election
Primary election
Party	Candidate	Votes	%
Republican	Robert Hickey	81,513	28.98%
Democratic	Mara W. Elliott	68,020	24.18%
Democratic	Rafael Castellanos	54,319	19.31%
Democratic	Gil Cabrera	47,072	16.73%
Democratic	Bryan Pease	30,011	10.67%
Total votes		280,935	100%
General election
Democratic	Mara W. Elliott	267,122	57.34%
Republican	Robert Hickey	198,735	42.66%
Total votes		465,857	100%
