= Las Golondrinas =

Ecuadorian province

Coordinates: 0°19′30″N 79°12′36″W

Las Golondrinas was a province of Ecuador. In a referendum held on April 3, 2016, 56.9% of voters voted in favor of Las Golondrinas being incorporated into the Imbabura Province.
