= Cannabis in North Dakota =

Cannabis in North Dakota is legal for medical use but illegal for recreational use. Since 2019 however, possession under a 1/2 ounce has been decriminalized in the sense that there is no threat of jail time, though a criminal infraction fine up to $1,000 still applies. The cultivation of hemp is currently legal in North Dakota. In November 2018, the state's voters voted on recreational marijuana legalization, along with Michigan; the measure was rejected 59% to 41%. Two groups attempted to put marijuana legalization measures on the June 2020 Primary and the November 2020 elections, but were prevented from doing so by the COVID-19 pandemic.

After a failed attempt in 2021 to legislatively legalize recreational cannabis, advocates successfully placed an initiative on the November 2022 ballot. This attempt at legalization failed when a majority of voters rejected the measure.

== Prohibition ==
Marijuana was made illegal in North Dakota in 1933; Oklahoma made it illegal the same year, and South Dakota in 1931. In May 2019, penalties were reduced in the state, with possession resulting in a fine instead of jail time, however possession of any amount of hashish or concentrates is still a felony, with punishment up to 5 years in prison.

== Medical marijuana ==
=== Failed attempts (2015) ===
In 2015, House Bill 1430 attempted to establish a medical marijuana framework, but was voted down at 26-67 in February. Members of the House Human Services Committee stated: “We just felt that the concerns and the risks at this point in time outweigh the potential benefits … for a small group that feels that none of the currently available drugs work". Following the bill's failure, a Fargo resident began the process of preparing a ballot initiative to legalize medical marijuana for the 2016 general election.

=== Medical legalization (2016) ===
In 2016, North Dakota voters approved Measure 5, establishing a medical cannabis program for their state. In 2017, both houses of the state legislature passed changes to Measure 5, including removal of a provision allowing medical users to grow their own marijuana. The changes also required that a medical professional specifically recommend smoking as a method of using marijuana in some cases. Some backers of the ballot initiative were displeased with the legislation, saying that some of the regulations were not justifiable. The bill passed both houses of the ND State Legislature with the required two-thirds majority. As of July 10, 2018, the North Dakota Department of Health has opened an application window for medical cannabis dispensary licenses in the Bismarck and Fargo areas.

=== Medical Marijuana Program ===
Effective April 18, 2017, the North Dakota Department of Health established and implemented a medical marijuana program to allow the production, processing, sale, dispensing, and medical use of marijuana by qualifying patients and caregivers. In May 2018, Pure Dakota LLC and Grassroots Cannabis were selected to run the two manufacturing facilities allowed under the program's rules.

== Recreational Marijuana ==
=== Recreational Referendum 2018 (Failed) ===
North Dakota residents voted on an initiative to legalise recreational marijuana at the same time as the 2018 midterms. The measure was rejected 59% to 41%.

=== Decriminalization (2019) ===
In May 2019, Governor Doug Burgum signed HB 1050, which eliminated the threat of jail time for adults over 21 that possess up to half an ounce of cannabis, although the maximum allowable fine was not modified. The bill also reduced penalties for possession of larger amounts.

=== Recreational Referendum 2020 (Not on the ballot) ===
The North Dakota Freedom of Cannabis Act would have legalized recreational marijuana in the North Dakota for those 21 and older. It would also allow North Dakotans to grow a small number of plants at home, but it would have specifically barred public consumption. The measure needed a minimum of 27,000 valid signatures. The sponsoring committee was about 3,000 signatures short.

=== Recreational Referendum 2022 ===
New Approach ND lead the signature-gathering process, turning in signatures in July 2022. The initiative would allow adults 21 years or older to possess up to one ounce of cannabis, four grams of concentrate, and grow up to three plants for personal use. In the November 2022 election, voters rejected legalization with 54.94% voting no.

== Polling ==
A late-2014 poll conducted by the University of North Dakota found that North Dakotans favored medical marijuana 47-41, but were against legalizing recreational marijuana, 24-68. A 2018 poll showed that North Dakotans favored the recreational marijuana ballot initiative 46-39 with 15 percent undecided.

== Legislation ==
Personal use possession of less than 1/2 of an ounce (14 g) is a Class B misdemeanor punishable by a maximum sentence of 30 days imprisonment and a maximum fine of $1,000. Personal use possession of less than half an ounce while operating a motor vehicle is a Class A misdemeanor punishable by a maximum sentence of 1 year imprisonment and a maximum fine of $1,000. Personal use possession of 1/2–1 ounce (14–28 g) is a Class A misdemeanor punishable by a maximum sentence of 1 year imprisonment and a maximum fine of $1,000.

In 2021, the North Dakota legislature attempted to legalize marijuana when state representative Jason Dockter (R-Bismarck) introduced legislation to allow adults 21 and older to possess and purchase up to 1 ounce of marijuana for personal use. The legislation prohibited home cultivation and required that purchases be tracked and limited to the legal amount. Dockter and other Republicans supported the bill despite their personal opposition to legalization in order to prevent a more permissive voter-sponsored legalization measure from appearing on the ballot in 2022. Although it was approved by the state house, the state senate rejected the proposal in a 10-37 vote on March 25, 2021; activists subsequently pledged to move forward with their own ballot initiative.
