= 2016 Georgia state elections =

2016 Georgia elections
- November 8, 2016

Georgia's state elections were held on November 8, 2016.

== Federal elections ==
=== Results ===
United States presidential election in Georgia, 2016
Party	Candidate	Running mate	Votes	Percentage	Electoral votes
Republican	Donald Trump	Mike Pence	2,089,104	51.05%	16
Democratic	Hillary Clinton	Tim Kaine	1,877,963	45.89%	0
Libertarian	Gary Johnson	William Weld	125,306	3.06%	0
Totals			4,092,373	100.00%	16
Source: Georgia Secretary of State

=== U.S. Senate ===
United States Senate election in Georgia, 2016
Party	Candidate	Votes	%
Republican	Johnny Isakson (incumbent)	2,135,806	54.80%
Democratic	Jim Barksdale	1,599,726	41.04%
Libertarian	Allen Buckley	162,260	4.16%
Total votes		3,897,792	100.00%
Republican hold			

== Public Service Commission ==
=== District 2 ===
2016 Georgia Public Service Commission District 2 election
- November 8, 2016
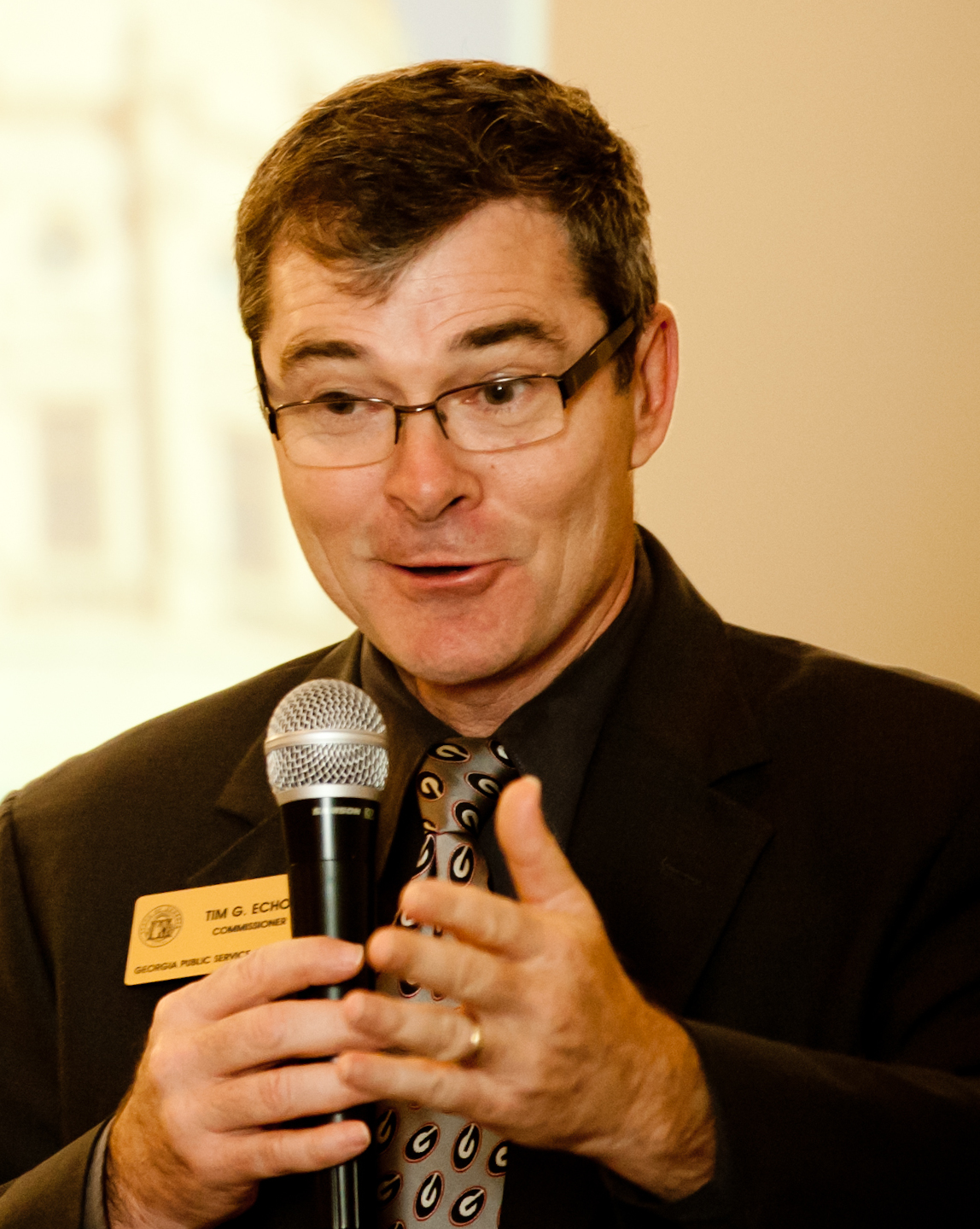

Nominee	Tim Echols	Eric Hoskins
Party	Republican	Libertarian
Popular vote	2,390,836	1,200,076
Percentage	66.58%	33.42%
- Echols: 50–60% 60–70% 70–80% 80–90% >90% Hoskins: 50–60% 60–70%
Commissioner before election
Tim Echols
Republican
Elected Commissioner
Tim Echols
Republican

Incumbent Commissioner Tim Echols defeated challengers Kellie Austin and Michelle Miller in the Republican primary. Echols defeated Libertarian Eric Hoskins in the general election, with no Democrat filing for the contest.

==== Republican primary ====
- Kellie Austin
- Tim Echols, incumbent
- Michelle Miller

===== Results =====
Republican primary results
Party	Candidate	Votes	%
Republican	Tim Echols (incumbent)	373,466	68.97
Republican	Michelle Miller	97,025	17.92
Republican	Kellie Austin	71,010	13.11
Total votes		541,501	100

==== Libertarian nominee ====
- Eric Hoskins

==== General election ====
2016 Georgia Public Service Commission District 2 election
Party	Candidate	Votes	%
Republican	Tim Echols (incumbent)	2,390,836	66.58
Libertarian	Eric Hoskins	1,200,076	33.42
Total votes		3,590,912	100
Republican hold			

== General Assembly ==
All 56 seats in the Georgia State Senate and 180 seats in the Georgia House of Representatives were up for election.

=== Georgia State Senate ===
Party	Before	After	Change
Republican	39	38	▼1
Democratic	17	18	▲1
Total	56	56	

=== Georgia House of Representatives ===
Party	Before	After	Change
Republican	118	118	Steady
Democratic	61	62	▲1
Independent	1	0	▼1
Total	180	180	

== Judicial elections ==
One seat on the Georgia Supreme Court and two seats on the Georgia Court of Appeals were up for statewide elections. Supreme Court justice David Nahmias and Court of Appeals judges Anne Barnes and Chris McFadden all won their respective races uncontested.

== Ballot measures ==
=== Amendment 1 ===
Results by county Yes: 50–60%; No: 70–80%; 60–70%; 50–60%

Provides greater flexibility and state accountability to fix failing schools through increasing community involvement.

Amendment 1
Choice	Votes	%
For	1,615,780	40.09
Against	2,414,401	59.91
Total	4,030,181	100.00

=== Amendment 2 ===
Results by county Yes: 80–90%; 70–80%

Authorizes penalties for sexual exploitation and assessments on adult entertainment to fund child victims' services.

Amendment 2
Choice	Votes	%
For	3,314,355	83.30
Against	664,248	16.70
Total	3,978,603	100.00

=== Amendment 3 ===
Results by county Yes: 60–70%; 50–60%; No: 50–60%

Reforms and re-establishes the Judicial Qualifications Commission and provides for its composition, governance, and powers.

Amendment 3
Choice	Votes	%
For	2,341,495	62.50
Against	1,405,117	37.50
Total	3,746,612	100.00

=== Amendment 4 ===
Results by county Yes: 80–90%; 70–80%

Dedicates revenue from existing taxes on fireworks to trauma care, fire services, and public safety.

Amendment 4
Choice	Votes	%
For	3,205,955	81.18
Against	743,103	18.82
Total	3,949,058	100.00
