= 2016 Ascension general election =

General elections were held on Ascension Island on 1 September 2016 to elect the Island Council. Six candidates ran for five available Councillor positions.

== Electoral system ==
The Island Council consists of either five or seven elected members, depending on the number of candidates. If there are eight or more candidates, seven members would be elected; if there were fewer than eight candidates, only five would be elected. With only 6 candidates running, 5 seats were available.

The five seats were elected for three years terms by plurality-at-large voting. Voters were able to cast up to five votes.

== Results ==
Candidate	Votes	%
Marie-Anne Mabel Dennis	93	76.86
Jacqueline Rose Ellick	80	66.12
Keturah Viola George	76	62.81
Nicholas Ivan John	68	56.20
Samantha Jean Arms-Lawrence	55	45.45
Katie Jean Downes	36	29.75
Total	408	100.00
Total votes	121	–
Registered voters/turnout		23
Source: Government of Ascension Island
