= 2016 Jamaican local elections =

Local election in Jamaica

2016 Jamaican local government election
- 28 November 2016

228 Jamaican electoral divisions 13 Parish Councils/Municipal Councils
- Turnout: 550,012
	First party	Second party
Party	JLP	PNP
Last election	75, 42.7% 0 councils	151, 55.7% 12 councils
Seats won	131; 8 councils	97; 3 councils
Seat change	▲56 ▲8 councils	▼54 ▼9 councils
Popular vote	287,783	258,256
Percentage	52.3%	47.0%
Swing	▲9.6%	▼8.7%
- Results by municipal corporation

Local elections were held in Jamaica on November 28, 2016.

== Results ==
Party	Votes	%	Seats			
Party	Votes	%	Seats	+/–	Councils	+/–
Jamaica Labour Party	287,783	52.32	131	+56	8	+8
People's National Party	258,256	46.95	97	–54	3	–9
Marcus Garvey People's Political Party	41	0.01	0	0	0	0
Jamaica Alliance Movement	8	0.00	0	New	0	New
Independents	3,924	0.71	0	–2	0	0
Total	550,012	100.00	228	0	11	0
