= 2016 Pennsylvania elections =

- November 8, 2016
- Registered: 8,722,977
- Turnout: 70.1%

Elections were held in Pennsylvania on November 8, 2016. On that date, the state held elections for President of the United States, U.S. Senate, U.S. House of Representatives, Pennsylvania State Senate, Pennsylvania House of Representatives, and various others.

Pennsylvania certified Donald Trump's state victory for President on December 12, 2016.
