= 2016 Abkhazian local elections =

- 3 April 2016
- District and city assemblies (6th convocation, excluding Gali District)
Party	Leader	Vote %	Seats	+/–
Independents / Local Candidates				
This lists parties that won seats. See the complete results below.

On 3 April 2016, Abkhazia held local elections for the 6th convocations of its local assemblies in all districts except Gali.

== Background ==
The terms of the 5th convocations had originally been set to expire in February 2015, but were extended on 17 December 2014 by the People's Assembly. On 3 February 2016, the People's Assembly extended elections in Gali District once again, until 12 February 2017, because of the unresolved passport situation.

== Sukhumi ==
The election for Sukhumi City Council was contested by 82 candidates. Originally, 88 candidates had been nominated but three refused to stand as candidate. Of the remaining 85 candidates, twelve were nominated by United Abkhazia, one by the Abkhazian Railways and the rest by initiative groups. 18 were women. 14 of the candidates were incumbent deputies. All but one of the candidates were successfully registered. Two further candidates withdrew at a later date.

=== Results ===
Turnout was 14,718 out of 39,070 eligible voters (38%). The elections in constituencies no. 21 and 23 were declared invalid, as voter turnout was below 25%. Reruns in these constituencies were held on 29 May. One of the elected council members was a woman.

**Results of the 2016 Sukhumi City Council election** by constituency (vertical) slanted = incumbent, **bold** = winner, green = nominated by United Abkhazia, blue = nominated by Abkhazian Railways
#	Winner	**Losing candidates**						**Not registered**
**1**	Georgi Shakaia	Dalila Kvitsinia	Daut Nanba	Astelo Adleiba	Astanda Bigvava			
**2**	Lasha Ashuba							
**3**	Inna Kvarchia	Lasha Sakania	Beslan Benia	Appolon Lataria				
**4**	Daur Delba	Ruslan Abukhba	Svetlana Laz-ogly					
**5**	Dmitri Marshania	Adgur Kvarchelia						
**6**	Astamur Kutarba	Joni Kvasia	Leila Dzyba					
**7**	Mizan Zantaria	Raul Bebia						
**8**	Konstantin Pilia	Marina Galustyan	Aida Khonelia					Aslan Lomia
**9**	Dmitri Gunba	Adamyr Mukba	Dato Kajaia					
**10**	Bagrat Zantaria	Anna Gunia	Aslan Zukhba					
**11**	Semen Bzhania	Aleksei Archelia	Anatoli Kvitsinia	Damir Symsym	Alias Brandzia			
**12**	Daur Eshba	Vadim Kvachakhia	Georgi Manaka	Denis Tsabria	Lasha Shamba			
**13**	Leon Gubaz	Murtaz Shamatava	Valeri Bganba	David Papba				
**14**	David Mirzoyan	Alkhas Kiria	Beslan Kvitsinia	Beslan Dopua	Beslan Arshba	Raul Kharabua	Enrik Leiba	
**15**	Timur Shapkovski	Robert Jopua	Viktoria Gunia	Apsyrt Kanjaria				
**16**	Ardashes Ovsepyan	Alkhas Zhiba	Albina Markholia	Arnold Minaia	Eliso Sangulia	Izolda Turkia	Damei Sangulia	
**17**	Irakli Kharchilava	Rismag Ajinjal						
**18**	Joni Smyr	Dmitri Shlarba	Garri Inapshba					
**19**	Narsou Salakaia	Lali Minjia	Zaira Margia	Irina Dochia				
**20**	Vitali Chitanava	Gocha Lagvilava						
**21**	Temur Arshba	Andrei Pogosov						
**22**	Leonid Gvinjia							
**23**	Said Adleiba	Anzor Tvidzba						
**24**	Roman Tskua							
**25**	Denis Inapshba	Alkhas Manargia	Liana Kvitsinia					
**26**	Adamur Lagvilava	Daur Bzhania	Kama Anua					

== Gagra District ==
65 candidates were nominated in 25 constituencies, 6 of whom women. Preliminary turnout was 46%. One of the elected deputies was a woman and only four were incumbents.

The new assembly elected Astan Agrba as its chairman and Aleksandr Tsyshba as its deputy chairman.

**Results of the 2016 Gagra District Assembly election** by constituency (vertical) slanted = incumbent, **bold** = winner
#	Winner	**Losing candidates**				**Not registered**
**1**	Arkadi Zhiba	Daur Agrba				
**2**	Almaskhan Bartsyts	Adamur Kvekveskiri				
**3**	Alkhas Shamba	Ford Chichba	Tengiz Gabunia			
**4**	Malkhaz Kokoskeria	Nanuli Bagatelia				
**5**	Rafael Papazyan	Liana Gezerdava				
**6**	Khamurza Ashkharua	Alla Grigoria				
**7**	Astan Agrba	Timur Beia				
**8**	Denis Bganba	Iuri Khagush				Vladislav Inapkha
**9**	Astamur Arshba	Aram Kosyan				
**10**	Aleksandr Tsishba					
**11**	Akhrik Bganba	Adamur Tsishba				
**12**	Adamur Bagatelia	Maia Pasania	Erast Bartsits	Guram Agrba	Ruslan Kokoskeria	
**13**	Revaz Benia	Astamur Mukba	Temuri Kokoskeria	Roman Ketia	Astamur Ketsba	
**14**	Adgur Jenia	Teimuraz Khishba				Stepan Shvets
**15**	Alias Zhiba	Ainar Inal-Ipa				
**16**	Otari Arshba	Aleksandr Sorokin				
**17**	Ashkanui Kesyan	Astamur Sergegia	Karine Delenyan			
**18**	Artush Mesropyan	Alkhas Agrba	Levon Dashchyan	Zaur Dasania		
**19**	Akhra Agrba	Beslan Kvarchia	Mikhail Uglava	Nali Tsugba	Temur Tarba	
**20**	Matvei Topolyan	Vartanes Raganyan				
**21**	Yervand Ustyan	Nikolai Eksuzyan				
**22**	Artur Nagulyan	Stanislav Khishba				
**23**	Alkhas Chanba	Sergei Melkonyan	Agasi Tsaturyan			
**24**	Roman Kharabua	Galust Trapizonyan				
**25**	Feliks Jikirba	Arkadi Sarkisyan				

=== Pitsunda ===
15 candidates were nominated in 9 constituencies, 1 of whom a woman, who was not elected.

== Gudauta District ==
55 candidates were nominated in 29 constituencies, 6 of whom women. All candidates were nominated by initiative groups. Turnout was reported as 41.5% and 55%. One of the women was elected. Among the elected deputies was long time New Athos mayor Feliks Dauta, who declared that after 13 years as mayor he wanted try his hand at being a deputy.

The new council elected Roman Bazba as its chairman and Inal Tsveiba as its deputy chairman.

=== New Athos ===
13 candidates were nominated in 9 constituencies, 4 of whom women. Of the elected deputies, one was a woman.

The new assembly re-elected Ramaz Smyr as its chairman and Temur Otyrba as its deputy chairman.

== Sukhumi District ==
28 candidates were nominated in 15 constituencies, 3 of whom women. The election in constituency no. 12 was declared invalid because turnout was less than 25%. Overall turnout was 42% out of 6611 registered voters. Of the elected deputies, one was a woman. All had been nominated by initiative groups.

The new assembly elected Zaur Sangulia as its chairman and Rudolf Tarba as its deputy chairman.

== Gulripshi District ==
23 candidates were nominated in 16 constituencies, 4 of whom women. All candidates were nominated by initiative groups. Turnout was 4268 out of 11,099 registered voters (39.6%). Of the elected deputies, two were women. The election in constituency no. 7 was declared invalid because two additional ballots were found, it will be repeated on 29 May.

The new assembly re-elected Igor Mikvabia as its new chairman and Andronik Kondakchyan as its deputy chairman.

== Ochamchira District ==
60 candidates were nominated in 32 constituencies, 7 of whom women. Turnout was reported as 54.4% and 55.5%. Among the elected deputies were 4 women and only about 10% were incumbents.

The new assembly elected Adgur Kvitsinia as its chairman and Omari Shat-ipa as its deputy chairman.

== Tkvarcheli District ==
30 candidates were nominated in 15 constituencies, 5 of whom women. Turnout was 46.4%. The election in constituency no. 14 (Chkhortol) was declared invalid because the two highest scoring candidates had received the same number of votes. None of the 14 winning candidates were incumbents, 2 were women, 2 had been nominated by Amtsakhara and 12 by initiative groups.

The new Assembly elected Damir Gorzolia as its chairman and Melis Jinjolia as its deputy chairman.
