= 2016 Miami-Dade County mayoral election =

- August 30, 2016 (first round); November 8, 2016 (runoff)
- Turnout: 20.5% ▲ (first round); 72.4% ▲ (runoff)

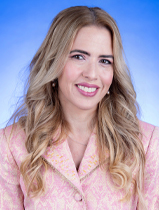
Candidate	Carlos A. Giménez	Raquel Regalado
First round	121,891; 47.6%	81,952; 32.0%
Runoff	475,547; 55.8%	376,249; 44.2%
Candidate	Frederick Bryant	Alfred Santamaria
First round	22,710; 8.9%	22,277; 8.7%
Runoff	Eliminated	Eliminated
- Runoff results by precinct Giménez: 50–60% 60–70% 70–80% 80–90% >90% Regalado: 50–60% 60–70% 70–80% 80–90% >90% Tie: 50% No data
Mayor before election
Carlos A. Giménez
Republican
Elected mayor
Carlos A. Giménez
Republican

The 2016 Miami-Dade County mayoral election took place on November 8, 2016. After a primary on August 30, incumbent Mayor Carlos A. Giménez defeated Miami-Dade School Board member Raquel Regalado on November 8. The election was officially nonpartisan. The race was marred by controversy, including attempts by Regalado to take Giménez off the ballot and accusations that Giménez was responsible for flyers suggesting Regalado was in association with then Republican Presidential nominee Donald Trump.

== Candidates ==
=== Advanced to runoff ===
- Carlos A. Giménez, mayor of Miami-Dade County (Republican Party)
- Raquel Regalado, Miami-Dade School Board member (Republican Party)

=== Eliminated in primary ===
- Frederick Bryant, printer (Democratic Party)
- Benjamin "B. J." Chiszar, former chair of the Miami-Dade County Democratic Party (Democratic Party)
- Miguel A. Eizmendiz, former political consultant (Independent)
- Farid Khavari, former gubernatorial candidate in 2010 and 2014 (Democratic Party)
- Alfred Santamaria, former staffer for David Rivera (Republican Party)

=== Declined ===
- Jean Monestime, Chairman of County Commission (Democratic Party)
- Xavier Suarez, County Commissioner and former mayor of Miami (Independent)

== Primary election ==
2016 Miami-Dade County mayoral election
Candidate	Votes	%
Carlos A. Giménez (incumbent)	121,891	47.61
Raquel Regalado	81,952	32.01
Frederick Bryant	22,710	8.87
Alfred Santamaria	22,277	8.70
Farid Khavari	2,967	1.16
Benjamin "B. J." Chiszar	2,669	1.04
Miguel A. Eizmendiz	1,546	0.60
Total votes	256,012	100.00

== General election ==
2016 Miami-Dade County mayoral election runoff
Candidate	Votes	%
Carlos A. Giménez (incumbent)	475,547	55.83
Raquel Regalado	376,249	44.17
Total votes	851,796	100.00
