= 2016 Auckland local board elections =

Election in New Zealand

The 2016 Auckland local board elections were held as part of the 2016 New Zealand local elections; 145 members were elected to local boards.

== Results ==
Excludes the Wairoa subdivision of Franklin

Party	Local Board members	Boards Controlled
Local Parties	63	6
Independent	26	1
Labour	26	4
Communities & Residents	11	1
City Vision	10	2
Auckland Future	5	0
