= 2016–17 Maharashtra local elections =

Indian local elections

2016–17 Maharashtra Local Body election
- Phase I – 28 November 2016; Phase II – 14 December; Phase III – 18 December; Phase IV – 8 January 2017

Around 4000 seats to the 192 Maharashtra Municipal Councils
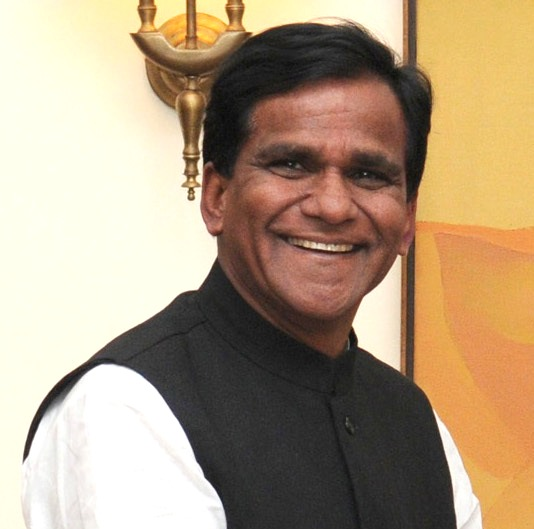

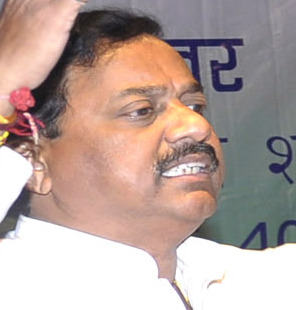
	Majority party	Minority party	Third party
Leader	Raosaheb Danve	Ashok Chavan	Sunil Tatkare
Party	BJP	INC	NCP
Last election	506 seats	1220 seats	1039 seats
Seats won	1147	873	847
Seat change	▲641	▼347	▼192
	Fourth party
Leader	Uddhav Thackeray
Party	SS
Last election	579 seats
Seats won	608
Seat change	▲29

Local elections were held in Maharashtra in four phases, to select the 4,750 members of the 192 municipal councils and 20 Nagar Panchayat. Results were announced the day after each round of voting. The first phase took place on 27 November and saw the BJP emerge as the largest party in municipal councils, winning control of 53 of the 147 councils and winning 857 of the 3,417 seats. The Indian National Congress emerged as the largest party in Nagar Panchayat elections, winning 84 of the 253 seats on 18 Nagar Panchayats. Overall, the BJP emerged as the largest party winning 1,1147 seats.

== Results ==
=== Phase 1 Municipal Council Results ===
Council	INC	NCP	BJP	SHS	Others	Council President	Party
Raigad District
Khopoli	2	10	3	10	4	Suman Ausarmal	NCP
Uran	0	0	13	5	0	Sayali Mhatre	BJP
Pen	11	0	7	0	3	Pritam Patil	INC
Alibaug 17	0	0	0	0	17	Prashant Naik	SKP
Murud Janjira	2	3	0	9	2	Sneha Patil	SHS
Roha	0	14	0	1	2	Santosh Potfode	NCP
Shrivardhan	1	10	0	5	1	Narendra bhusane	NCP
Mahad	12	0	0	5	0	Snehal Jagtap	INC
Matheran	1	2	0	14	0	Prerna Sawant	SHS
Ratnagiri District
Chiplun	5	4	5	10	2	Surekha Kherade	BJP
Ratnagiri	0	5	6	17	2	Rahul Pandit	SHS
Khed	0	0	0	10	7	Vaibhav Khedekar	MNS
Rajapur	7	1	1	8	0	Hanif Kazi	INC
Sindhudurg District
Vengurle	7	1	6	1	2	Rajan Girap	BJP
Sawantwadi	8	0	1	7	1	Baban Salgaonkar	SHS
Malwan	4	2	5	5	1	Mahesh Kandalgaonkar	SHS
Solapur District
Barshi 40	0	11	0	29	0	Asif Tamboli	SHS
Pandharpur 35	0	9	0	0	26	Sadhna Bhosale	Other
Akkalkot 23	7	1	15	0	1	Shobha Khedgi	NCP
Karmala 17	5	6	0	0	6	Vaibhav Jagtap	NCP
Kurduwadi 17	0	0	0	7	10	Samir Mulani	SHS
Sangola 20	1	6	4	4	5	Rani Mane	Other
Mangalwedha 17	5	6	0	0	6	Aruna Mali	NCP
Maindargi 17	0	0	4	0	13	Dipti Kesur	Other
Dudhni 17	15	0	2	0	0	Bhimashankar Ingale	BJP
Kolhapur District
Panhala 17	0	0	0	0	17	Rupali Dhadle	Jansurajya
Gadhinglaj 17	0	4	3	0	10	Swati Kori	Janta Dal
Murgud 17	0	2	0	12	3	Rajekhan Jamadar	SHS
Pethwadgav 17	0	0	0	0	17	Mohan Mali	Other
Malkapur 17	0	4	4	4	5	Amol Kesarkar	BJP
Kurundwad 17	5	6	6	0	0	Jairam Patil	INC
Kagal 20	0	11	9	0	0	Manik Mali	NCP
Jaisingpur 24	0	10	0	0	14	Nita Mane	Tararani
Ichalkaranji	12	18	14	1	19	Alka Swami	BJP
Sangli District
Islampur 28	0	14	0	0	14	Nishikant Patil	Other
Vita 24	22	0	0	2	0	Pratibha Patil	INC
Ashta 21	0	15	0	0	6	Sneha Mali	Other
Tasgav 21	0	8	13	0	0	Vijay Sawant	BJP
Palus 17	12	0	1	0	4	Raju Sadamate	INC
Satara District
Satara 40	0	0	6	0	34	Madhavi Kadam	NCP
Phaltan	8	17	0	0	0	Neeta Newase	NCP
Karad 29	16	6	4	0	3	Rohini Shinde	BJP
Wai 20	6	14	0	0	0	Pratibha Shinde	BJP
Mhaswad 17	7	0	0	0	10	Tushar Veerkar	NCP
Rahimatpur 17	4	13	0	0	0	Anand Kore	NCP
Mahabaleshwar 17	0	10	0	5	2	Swapnali Shinde	NCP
Pachgani	11	6	0	0	0	Lakshmi Karadkar	Other
Ahmednagar District
Sangamner 28	23	1	1	2	1	Durga Tambe	INC
Kopargaon 28	0	7	14	6	1	Vijay Wahadne	Other
Shrirampur 32	22	0	0	0	10	Anuradha Adik	INC
Rahata	6	1	7	2	1	Mamta Pipada	BJP
Pathardi 17	0	5	12	0	0	Mrityunjay Garje	BJP
Rahuri 21	0	0	0	0	21	Prajakt Tanpure	Other
Devlali 18	0	1	16	1	0	Satyajit Kadam	BJP
Nashik District
Manmad 31	5	5	0	18	3	Padmavati Dhatrak	SHS
Sinnar 28	0	0	10	17	1	Kiran Dagle	SHS
Yeola 24	0	10	4	5	5	Bandu Kshirsagar	BJP
Satana 21	2	5	6	0	8	Sunil More	Other
Nandgaon 17	2	4	0	11	0	Rajesh Kawde	SHS
Bhagoor 18	0	1	0	17	0	Anita Karanjkar	SHS
Nandurbar District
Shahada	11	0	10	0	5	Motilal Patil	BJP
Dhule District
Shirpur	21	0	4	0	5	Jayshri Patel	INC
Dondaicha	3	0	20	0	1	Nayan Rawal	BJP
Jalgaon District
Bhusawal	0	0	26	1	21	Raman Bhole	BJP
Chopda	0	0	0	9	20	Manisha Chaudhari	Other
Amalner	0	0	1	4	29	Pushpalata Patil	Other
Chalisgaon 34	0	0	13	2	19	Ashalata Chauhan	BJP
Pachora 26	0	7	8	11	0	Sanjay Gohil	SHS
Yawal	8	0	0	1	11	Surekha Koli	SHS
Faizpur	3	4	5	1	4	Mahananda Hole	BJP
Sawda	0	7	9	0	1	Anita Yeole	BJP
Raver 17	0	0	4	1	12	Dara Mohammad	Other
Erandol	1	9	4	5	1	Ramesh Pardeshi	BJP
Dharangaon	0	0	6	14	0	Salim Patel	SHS
Parola	0	0	7	5	9	Karan Pawar	BJP
Jalna District
Jalna 61	12	5	9	5	2	Sangita Gorantyal	INC
Bhokardan 17	9	4	4	0	0	Manjusha Deshmukh	INC
Ambad 19	5	5	6	1	2	Sangita Kuche	BJP
Partur	10	0	6	2	2	Vimal Jethliya	INC
Parbhani District
Gangakhed 24	8	6	4	2	4	Vijay Tapadiya	INC
Selu 24	5	2	0	4	13	Vinod Borade	Other
Jintur 23	10	13	0	0	0	Sabiya Farooqi	NCP
Manwath 19	9	0	0	10	0	Shivkanya Swami	SHS
Pathri 20	0	20	0	0	0	Mina Bhore	NCP
Sonpeth 17	12	5	0	0	0	Jijabai Rathod	INC
Purna 20	1	8	0	5	6	Ganga Eklare	SHS
Hingoli District
Hingoli 32	6	13	3	6	4	Baba Bangar	BJP
basmath 28	6	8	7	6	1	Shriniwas Porajkar	SHS
Kalamnuri	3	5	0	9	0	Uttamrao Shinde	SHS
Beed District
Beed	0	19	2	1	28	Bharatbhushan Kshirsagar	NCP
Majalgaon	0	8	5	2	11	Sahal Chaus	BJP
Parli Vaijnath	1	27	4	1	0	Sarojini Halge	NCP
Ambejogai	6	16	6	0	0	Rachna Modi	INC
Georai	0	0	18	1	0	Sushil Jawanjal	BJP
Dharur	0	6	9	0	2	Swarup Hazare	BJP
Osmanabad District
Usmanabad	2	17	8	11	1	Makrand Nimbalkar	SHS
Paranda	0	9	4	4	0	Zakir Saudagar	NCP
Bhoom	3	14	0	0	0	Supriya Ware	NCP
Kalamb	7	10	0	0	0	Suwarna Munde	NCP
Tuljapur	0	14	6	0	0	Archana Gangane	NCP
Naldurg	5	12	0	0	0	Rekha Jagdale	NCP
Murum	15	0	0	2	0	Anita Ambar	INC
Umarga	8	3	7	4	0	Premlata Topge	INC
Yavatmal District
Yavatmal	12	4	29	8	3	Kanchan Chaudhari	SHS
Digras	6	0	0	10	7	Sadaf Jahan Mohammad	Other
Pusad	3	12	10	4	0	Anita Naik	NCP
Umarkhed	3	1	7	4	9	Namdev Sasane	BJP
Wani	0	0	22	0	4	Tarendra Borde	BJP
Ghatanji	3	0	2	1	11	Nayana Thakur	Other
Arni	7	8	0	4	0	Archana Mangam	SHS
Darwha	4	0	4	8	4	Baban Irwhe	SHS
Akola District
Akot	10	1	17	3	2	Harinarayan Makode	BJP
Telhara	0	2	4	0	11	Jaysherre Fundkar	BJP
Balapur	16	0	0	0	7	Ainoddin Khatib	INC
Patur	6	8	3	0	0	Prabha Kothalkar	INC
Murtizapur	1	5	7	4	6	Monali Gawande	BJP
Washim District
Karanja	0	0	2	1	25	Prakash Dhoke	BBM
Washim	2	2	15	8	3	Ashok Heda	SHS
Mangrulpir	1	7	7	0	3	Gajala Khan	BBM
Amravati District
Achalpur	7	3	7	2	19	Sunita Fiske	SHS
Anjangaon Surji	1	2	17	1	5	Kamalkant Ladole	BJP
Warud	4	2	16	0	2	Swati Ande	BJP
Chandur Bazar	0	2	6	0	9	Ravindra Pawar	BJP
Morshi	6	4	8	1	1	Sheela Rode	BJP
Shendurjanaghat	1	0	15	1	0	Rupes Mandawe	BJP
Daryapur	5	4	6	0	5	Nalini Bharsakle	BJP
Chandur Railway	10	0	5	0	2	Nilesh Suryawanshi	INC
Dhamangaon	2	0	15	0	0	Pratap Adsul	BJP
Buldhana District
Shegaon	3	3	14	4	2	Shakuntala Buch	BJP
Nandura	2	0	5	2	14	Rajni Jawre	Other
Malkapur	16	0	0	0	12	Harish Rawal	INC
Khamgaon	11	1	19	1	1	Anita Dawre	BJP
Mehkar	9	0	0	14	1	Kasam Gawli	INC
Chikhli	9	2	13	1	1	Priya Bondre	BJP
Buldhana	7	3	5	10	3	Najmunnisa Shajjad	BBM
Jalgaon Jamod	0	4	9	0	5	Seema Dobe	BJP
Deulgaon Raja	3	5	4	4	2	Sunita Shinde	BJP
Wardha District
Wardha 38	5	6	26	0	1	Atul Tarale	BJP
Hinganghat	0	4	28	1	5	Prem Basantani	BJP
Arvi 23	0	0	23	0	0	Prashant Savvalakhe	BJP
Sindi	6	2	8	0	1	Sangita Shende	BJP
Pulgaon 18	2	0	8	0	8	Shital Gate	BJP
Devli	6	0	0	11	0	Suchita Madavi	BJP
Chandrapur District
Ballarpur	11	0	15	3	3	Harish Sharma	BJP
Warora	3	1	10	9	1	Ahtesham Ali	BJP
Mul	1	0	16	0	0	Ratnmala Bhoir	BJP
Rajura	9	0	3	0	6	Arun Dhote	INC
	659	663	857	500	738		

=== Phase 2 Municipal Council Results ===
District	Council	INC	NCP	BJP	SHS	Others	Council President	Party
Pune District
Pune	Baramati	0	35	0	0	4	Pournima Tawre	NCP
Pune	Lonavala	6	0	9	6	4	Surekha Jadhav	BJP
Pune	Daund	0	15	0	0	9	Sheetal Kataria	Other
Pune	Talegaon Dabhade	0	0	0	0	26	Chitra Jagnade	BJP
Pune	Alandi	0	0	11	5	2	Vaijyanta Umargekar	BJP
Pune	Indapur	8	9	0	0	0	Ankita Shah	INC
Pune	Jejuri	11	6	0	0	0	Veena Sonawane	INC
Pune	Junnar	1	7	0	6	3	Shyam Pande	SHS
Pune	Saswad	0	0	0	0	19	Martand Bhonde	Other
Pune	Shirur	0	0	2	0	19	Vaishali Wakhare	Other
Latur District
Latur	Udgir	14	0	18	0	6	Basawraj Bagbande	BJP
Latur	Ausa	2	12	6	0	0	Afsar Shaikh	NCP
Latur	Nilanga	2	0	18	0	0	Balasaheb Shingade	BJP
Latur	Ahmadpur	2	9	6	2	4	Ashwini Kasnale	Other
Total		46	93	70	19	96		

=== Phase 3 Municipal Council Results ===
Council	INC	NCP	BJP	SHS	Others	Council President	Party
Aurangabad District
Kannad	14	0	0	2	7	Swati Kolhe	INC
Paithan	4	6	5	7	1	Suraj Lolge	BJP
Khuldabad	8	2	4	3	0	S M Qamar	INC
Gangapur	7	0	2	8	0	Vandana Patil	BJP
Nanded District
Hadgaon	8	1	2	6	0	Jyoti Rathod	INC
Kandhar	5	0	0	10	2	Shobha Tai	INC
Dharmabad	2	10	4	0	3	Afzal Begum	INC
Biloli	12	0	4	0	1	Maithili Kulkarni	INC
Deglur	12	11	2	0	0	Moglaji Shirshetwar	INC
Mukhed	2	0	9	3	3	Baburao Debadwar	INC
Umri	0	17	0	0	0	Anuradha Khandare	NCP
Kundalwadi	4	0	10	3	0		BJP
Mudkhed	15	0	0	0	2	Mujib Ansari	Other
Gadchiroli District
Gadchiroli	1	0	19	0	4	Yogita Pipre	BJP
Desaiganj	4	1	12	0	0	Shalu Dandwate	BJP
Bhandara District
Bhandara	3	11	15	0	4	Sunil Mende	BJP
Tumsar	3	2	15	0	3	Pradip Padole	BJP
Pawni	5	3	2	1	6	Poonam Kaatekhate	other
Sakoli	1	1	12	3	0	Dhanwanta Raut	BJP
Total	110	65	117	46	36		

=== Phase 4 Municipal Council Results ===
District	Council	INC	NCP	BJP	SHS	Others	Council President	Party
Nagpur	Savner	6	0	14	0	0	Rekha Mowade	BJP
Nagpur	Umred	6	0	19	0	0	Vijaylakshmi Bhadoriya	BJP
Nagpur	Katol	0	0	1	0	22	Vaishali Thakur	Other
Nagpur	Narkhed	0	8	0	3	6	Abhijeet Gupta	Other
Nagpur	Khapa	1	0	15	0	1	Priyanka Mohite	BJP
Nagpur	Mohpa	10	0	5	2	0	nagargoje ajit	INC
Nagpur	Tiroda	0	9	5	2	1	Sonali Deshpande	BJP
Nagpur	Kamthi	16	0	8	1	7	Sahja Sapas	INC
Nagpur	Kalmeshwar	8	2	5	2	0	Smruti Ikhar	BJP
Gondia	Ramtek	2	0	13	2	0	Dilip Deshmukh	BJP
Gondia	Gondia	9	7	18	2	6	Ashok Ingale	BJP
	Total	58	26	103	14	43		

=== Nagar Panchayat ===
Despite Being Lost in State Municipal Council Election, Indian National Congress Made a Strong Comeback in Nagar Panchayat. Ruling and Winner of Municipal Council Election BJP is thrown on third Position.

District	Council	INC	NCP	BJP	SHS	Others
Palghar	Vikramgad 17	0	1	2	1	13
Palghar	Talasari 17	0	2	4	0	11
Palghar	Mokhada 17	1	2	1	13	0
Ratnagiri	Dapoli	4	4	2	7	0
Sangli	Khanapur	11	0	0	5	1
Sangli	kadegaon 17	10	0	7	0	17
Sangli	Kavthe Mahankal	0	12	4	0	1
Sangli	Shirala 18	0	0	0	0	18
Satara	Koregaon	8	9	0	0	0
Satara	Medha	0	7	3	2	4
Satara	Patan 17	0	13	1	2	1
Satara	Waduj	5	5	3	0	4
Satara	Khandala 17	7	9	0	0	1
Satara	Dahiwadi 17	11	5	0	0	1
Ahmadnagar	Shirdi 17	9	1	3	1	3
Jalgaon	Bodvad	2	4	7	1	3
Chandrapur	Sindewahi	6	0	11	0	0
Nanded	Ardhapur	10	4	0	0	3
Nanded	Mahur	3	8	1	4	1
Total		97	87	53	37	83

== Maharashtra Result Statistics ==
Summary of the November 2016 Maharashtra Local Body election results
Party	Flag	Nagar Adhyaksh	Nagar Sevak
Bharatiya Janata Party (BJP)		73	1147
Indian National Congress (INC)		35	873
Nationalist Congress Party (NCP)		23	847
Shiv Sena (SHS)		27	608
Others		33	913

== Regionwise Breakout ==
=== Konkan ===
Shivsena Become Largest Party in Konkan Region. Konkan Was Considered as Bastion of Shiv Sena. Performance of Shiv Sena here proved that. Indian National Congress Become Second Largest Party here. Ruling BJP is thrown on fourth position.

Summary of the November 2016 Maharashtra Local Body election results
Party	Flag	Nagar Adhyaksh	Nagar Sevak
Shiv Sena (SHS)		06	107
Indian National Congress (INC)		03	60
Nationalist Congress Party (NCP)		02	52
Bharatiya Janata Party (BJP)		03	47
Others		02	44

=== Pashchim Maharashtra ===
Nationalist Congress Party Become Largest Party in West Maharashtra Region. Pashchim Maharashtra Was Considered as Bastion of NCP. Performance of NCP here proved that. Indian National Congress Become Second Largest Party here. Shiv Sena is thrown on fourth position.

Summary of the November 2016 Maharashtra Local Body election results
Party	Flag	Nagar Adhyaksh	Nagar Sevak
Nationalist Congress Party (NCP)		09	284
Indian National Congress (INC)		07	213
Bharatiya Janata Party (BJP)		13	157
Shiv Sena (SHS)		04	92
Others		15	345

=== Uttar Maharashtra (Khandesh) ===
BJP Become Largest Party in Khandesh Region. Khandesh Was never Considered as Bastion of Any Party. Khandesh Always gave Mixed Results. Shiv Sena Become Second Largest Party here. Nationalist Congress Party is thrown on fourth position. NCP Poor perforamce here is subject to the Arrest of NCP Mass Leader Chhagan Bhujbal in corruption charges.

Summary of the November 2016 Maharashtra Local Body election results
Party	Flag	Nagar Adhyaksh	Nagar Sevak
Bharatiya Janata Party (BJP)		09	137
Shiv Sena (SHS)		07	122
Indian National Congress (INC)		01	56
Nationalist Congress Party (NCP)		00	52
Others		04	155

=== Marathwada ===
NCP Become Largest Party in Marathwada Region. Marathwada Was Considered as Bastion of Indian National Congress. Performance of NCP here broke the INC Bastion. Indian National Congress Become Second Largest Party here. Shivsena is thrown on fourth position.

Summary of the November 2016 Maharashtra Local Body election results
Party	Flag	Nagar Adhyaksh	Nagar Sevak
Nationalist Congress Party (NCP)		10	296
Indian National Congress (INC)		17	294
Bharatiya Janata Party (BJP)		10	198
Shiv Sena (SHS)		05	120
Others		09	105

=== Vidarbha ===
BJP Become Largest Party in Vidarbha Region. Vidarbha Was Considered as Bastion of BJP. Performance of BJP here proved that. Indian National Congress Become Second Largest Party here. Shivsena is thrown on fourth position.

Summary of the November 2016 Maharashtra Local Body election results
Party	Flag	Nagar Adhyaksh	Nagar Sevak
Bharatiya Janata Party (BJP)		38	608
Indian National Congress (INC)		08	288
Nationalist Congress Party (NCP)		01	142
Shiv Sena (SHS)		05	138
Others		09	264
