= 2016 East Timorese local elections =

Local elections were held in East Timor on 29 October 2016 for the first round and on 13 November 2016 for the second round to elect Village Chiefs (Chefe do Suco) and delegates for Village Councils (Conselho do Suco) in 442 sucos (villages). It included the election of Hamlet Chiefs (Chefe do Aldeia) in 2,225 aldeias (communities). Elected officials will serve a seven-year term.

== Background ==
Local elections were originally scheduled for 9 October 2015 but were postponed by the National Parliament. On 5 July 2016, Law No. 09/2016, also known as the "Law of Sucos," was enacted. It includes a provision on the manner of election for the village chiefs, village councils and hamlet chiefs. However, it does not provide overseas voting.

== Electoral system ==
The election for Village Council delegates follows the winner-take-all system, where the male and female candidates who obtain the greatest number of valid votes win the election. The members of the Village Council will then indirectly elect the youth and Lian-na'in (traditional authority) representatives.

For Village Chief and Hamlet Chief elections, the candidate who gets more than half of the valid votes is elected.

In the Hamlet Chief elections, the candidate who obtains more than half of the valid votes is elected. If there is no clear majority winner, a second round of voting is conducted.

The Technical Secretariat for Electoral Administration (Secretariado Tecnico da Administracao Eleitoral) and the National Election Commission (Comissao Nacional de Eleicoes) conduct the elections.

== Results ==
A total of 21 women were elected as Village Chiefs. About 30% or 142 out of the 442 sucos were able to elect Village Chiefs in the first round of voting, of which 6 were women, while 15 women were elected as Village Chiefs from 300 sucos that held a second round of voting.

This represented a jump from only 11 women elected as Village Chiefs in the 2009 elections.

Category	Total
Village Chief candidates	2,071
Village Chiefs elected	442
Hamlet Chiefs elected	2,225
Registered voters for local elections	728,363
