= Diana Terry =

American judge (born 1956)

Judge of the Colorado Court of Appeals
- In office July 5, 2006 – July 7, 2021
- Appointed by: Bill Owens
- Preceded by: W. Eric Kuhn

Personal details
- Born: 1956 (age 69–70) Monmouth County, New Jersey, U.S.
- Education: Rutgers University (BA, JD)

Diana Terry (born 1956) is a former Judge of the Colorado Court of Appeals.

== Early life and education ==
Terry was born 1956 in Fort Monmouth Army Hospital in New Jersey. She received a Bachelor of Arts from Rutgers College and a Juris Doctor from Rutgers University School of Law.

== Legal career ==
She began her legal career as a law clerk for Chancery Division of New Jersey Superior Court Presiding Judge Robert Tarleton. She was in private practice from 1985 to 2006 with the law firms of Sherman & Howard; Moye, Giles, O’Keefe, Vermeire & Gorrell; McElroy, Deutsch & Mulvaney; Law Office of Diana Terry; and White & Steele. Terry's practice focused on complex commercial litigation of intellectual property, computer technology, real estate, and insurance coverage matters.

== Appointment to state court of appeals ==
She was one of nine finalists for a new seat on the Colorado Court of Appeals. She was appointed to the court by Governor Bill Owens on July 5, 2006. She was retained by voters in 2008 and again in 2016. She retired on July 7, 2021.

== Other activities ==
She has been a faculty member of the National Institute for Trial Advocacy since 1995, and is a frequent CLE presenter.
