= Oklahoma Ballot State Question 790 =

Oklahoma Ballot State Question 790 was a ballot question in Oklahoma during the 2016 Elections that would have removed the Blaine Amendment (Article 2, Section 5) from the Oklahoma State Constitution. Question 790 was defeated.

Question 790 was placed on the ballot by the Oklahoma Legislature to overturn the state ban on using public money for religious purposes. This ban was incorporated in the Blaine amendment. The issues at hand were the state funding the attendance of a special needs child at a religious school and the placement of the Ten Commandments monument on the grounds of the state capitol. The initiative was opposed by several public school districts in Oklahoma and the American Civil Liberties Union, claiming a violation of the principle of separation of church and state.

The Oklahoma Supreme Court resolved that fight in early 2016 in Oliver v. Hofmeister.

== Blaine Amendment ==
In 1906, as a condition for achieving statehood, the writers of the Oklahoma State Constitution added the Blaine amendment. The amendment was written to block state funding for Catholic schools. However, decades later, the amendment was used for lawsuits against a state program allowing payment for special needs children to attend religious schools of any denomination.

The amendment also formed the legal argument for removing the Ten Commandments monument from state property because it was a religious symbol.

Question 790 was approved for consideration by a bi-partisan vote (39–5 in the Senate and 65–7 in the House). Neither political party and no statewide or national elected officials in Oklahoma have expressed their opposition to Question 790.

== Lindsey Nicole Program ==
The State of Oklahoma had created the Lindsey Nicole Scholarship Program for Children with Disabilities. Under this program, the state could award scholarships to special needs children to attend religious schools if their needs could not be met within a local public school.

The program was challenged in several lawsuits. including Jenks vs. Spry, Kimery vs. Brown, and finally Oliver v. Hofmeister Two local school districts sued the parents of a special needs child for accepting the scholarship, which was eventually dismissed by the Oklahoma Supreme Court.

National groups then joined the school districts in suing the State Board of Education in a series of suits that again ended up before the Oklahoma Supreme Court, which ruled against the school districts, for the parents of the children with disabilities, and upheld the Scholarship Program. This led a number of state legislators to question the Blaine amendment and introduce the ballot measure.

== State Question 790 ==
"This measure would remove Article 2, Section 5 of the Oklahoma Constitution, which prohibits the government from using public money or property for the direct or indirect benefit of any religion or religious institution. Article 2, Section 5 has been interpreted by the Oklahoma court as requiring the removal of a Ten Commandments monument from the grounds of the State Capitol. If this measure repealing Article 2, Section 5 is passed, the government would still be required to comply with the Establishment Clause of the United States Constitution, which is a similar constitutional provision that prevents the government from endorsing a religion or becoming overly involved with religion."

== Opposition to Question 790 ==
National church-state separation groups spoke out in opposition to Question 790 on the grounds that allowing religious groups to access state grants could tempt them away from their main mission. The ACLU opposed Question 790 on the grounds that overturning it could allow the Ten Commandments monument to be returned to the grounds on the state Capitol.
