= 2004 Michigan House of Representatives election =

- November 2, 2004

All 110 seats in the Michigan House of Representatives 56 seats needed for a majority
	Majority party	Minority party
Leader	Craig DeRoche	Dianne Byrum
Party	Republican	Democratic
Leader's seat	38th District	67th District
Last election	63	47
Seats after	58	52
Seat change	▼5	▲5
Popular vote	2,201,727	2,326,710
Percentage	48.23%	50.97%
- Results: Republican gain Democratic gain Republican hold Democratic hold
Speaker before election
Rick Johnson
Republican
Elected Speaker
Craig DeRoche
Republican

The 2004 Michigan House of Representatives elections were held on November 2, 2004, with partisan primaries to select the parties' nominees in the various districts on August 3, 2004.

== Predictions ==
Source	Ranking	As of
Rothenberg	Likely R	October 1, 2004

== Overview ==
Popular vote
Republican	48.23%
Democratic	50.97%

House seats
Republican	52.72%
Democratic	42.27%

=== Districts 1-28 ===
1st District (Wayne (Harper Woods, Grosse Pointe Woods, Grosse Pointe Township, Grosse Pointe Farms, Grosse Pointe, Grosse Pointe Park, far east Detroit))
Party	Candidate	Votes	%
Republican	Ed Gaffney (incumbent)	26,602	57.03
Democratic	C.J. Harrison	18,930	40.58
Green	Andrea Lavigne	1,116	2.39
Total votes		46,648	100.0
Republican hold			

2nd District (Wayne (northeast Detroit))
Party	Candidate	Votes	%
Democratic	LaMar Lemmons	23,297	94.74
Republican	Edith Floyd	1,293	5.26
Total votes		24,590	100.0
Democratic hold			

3rd District (Wayne (southeast Detroit))
Party	Candidate	Votes	%
Democratic	LaMar Lemmons	25,938	95.69
Republican	Michael Embry	1,167	4.31
Total votes		27,105	100.0
Democratic hold			

4th District (Wayne (south-central Detroit))
Party	Candidate	Votes	%
Democratic	Mary Waters (incumbent)	27,873	96.06
Republican	Carla Haska	1,143	3.94
Total votes		29,016	100.0
Democratic hold			

5th District (Wayne (north Detroit, Highland Park, Hamtramck))
Party	Candidate	Votes	%
Democratic	Bill McConico (incumbent)	23,625	100
Republican	Vicky Stefanow	0	0
Total votes		23,625	100.0
Democratic hold			

6th District (Wayne (south-central Detroit))
Party	Candidate	Votes	%
Democratic	Marsha Cheeks (incumbent)	26,880	91.98
Republican	Dorothy Patterson	1,511	5.17
Green	Michael Madias	832	2.85
Total votes		29,223	100.0
Democratic hold			

7th District (Wayne (north-central Detroit))
Party	Candidate	Votes	%
Democratic	Virgil Smith (incumbent)	30,393	96.43
Republican	Dolores Brodersen	1,125	3.57
Total votes		31,518	100.0
Democratic hold			

8th District (Wayne (northwest Detroit))
Party	Candidate	Votes	%
Democratic	George Cushingberry, Jr.	37,046	95.69
Republican	Melvin Byrd	1,667	4.31
Total votes		38,713	100.0
Democratic hold			

9th District (Wayne (far northwest Detroit))
Party	Candidate	Votes	%
Democratic	Tupac Hunter (incumbent)	33,020	95.02
Republican	Richard Zeile	1,729	4.98
Total votes		34,749	100.0
Democratic hold			

10th District (Wayne (west Detroit))
Party	Candidate	Votes	%
Democratic	Gabe Leland	25,660	90.7
Republican	Reuben Myers	2,631	9.3
Total votes		28,291	100.0
Democratic hold			

11th District (Wayne (west-central Detroit))
Party	Candidate	Votes	%
Democratic	Morris Hood (incumbent)	30,172	95.72
Republican	Charles Powell	1,348	4.28
Total votes		31,520	100.0
Democratic hold			

12th District (Wayne (southwest Detroit))
Party	Candidate	Votes	%
Democratic	Steve Tobocman (incumbent)	13,658	86.69
Republican	Anita Salazar	1,777	11.28
Libertarian	Raymond Warner	320	2.03
Total votes		15,755	100.0
Democratic hold			

13th District (Wayne (Riverview, Southgate, Trenton, Wyandotte))
Party	Candidate	Votes	%
Democratic	Barbara Farrah	26,396	64.02
Republican	Darrell Stasik	14,303	34.69
Libertarian	Bruce Morse	535	1.3
Total votes		41,234	100.0
Democratic hold			

14th District (Wayne (Ecorse, Lincoln Park, Melvindale, River Rouge, south Allen Park))
Party	Candidate	Votes	%
Democratic	Ed Clemente	27,504	72.56
Republican	Theresa Dombrowski	10,402	27.44
Total votes		37,906	100.0
Democratic hold			

15th District (Wayne (Dearborn—excluding northeast tip))
Party	Candidate	Votes	%
Democratic	Gino Polidori (incumbent)	23,923	64.68
Republican	Doug Thomas	13,063	35.32
Total votes		36,986	100.0
Democratic gain from Republican			

16th District (Wayne (north Allen Park, Dearborn Heights--southwest tip, Garden City, Inkster))
Party	Candidate	Votes	%
Democratic	Jim Plakas	25,756	70.29
Republican	Jeffrey Lauster	9,259	25.27
Libertarian	David Nagy	886	2.24
Constitution	William Lowry	740	2.02
Total votes		35,903.02	100.0
Democratic hold			

17th District (Wayne (Dearborn Heights—excluding southwest tip, Livonia--southeast tip, Redford Township))
Party	Candidate	Votes	%
Democratic	Andy Dillon	25,180	59.29
Republican	Darryl Husk	16,202	38.15
Libertarian	Kerry Morgan	1,084	2.55
Total votes		42,466	100.0
Democratic hold			

18th District (Wayne (Westland))
Party	Candidate	Votes	%
Democratic	Glenn Anderson (incumbent)	22,773	66.73
Republican	Kip Lipford	10,811	31.68
Constitution	Harold Dunn	541	1.59
Total votes		34,125	100.0
Democratic hold			

19th District (Wayne (Livonia—excluding southeast tip))
Party	Candidate	Votes	%
Republican	John R. Pastor (incumbent)	26,265	53.13
Democratic	Joan Gebhardt	23,168	46.87
Total votes		49,433	100.0
Republican hold			

20th District (Wayne (Northville--portion within county, Northville Township, Plymouth, Plymouth Township, east Canton Township, Wayne))
Party	Candidate	Votes	%
Republican	John Stewart (incumbent)	28,732	59.63
Democratic	Marc Corriveau	19,448	40.37
Total votes		48,180	100.0
Republican hold			

21st District (Wayne (Belleville, Van Buren Township, Canton Township—excluding eastern slice))
Party	Candidate	Votes	%
Republican	Phil LaJoy (incumbent)	27,225	57.68
Democratic	Ralph Mayer	19,979	42.32
Total votes		47,204	100.0
Republican hold			

22nd District (Wayne (Romulus, Taylor))
Party	Candidate	Votes	%
Democratic	Hoon-Yung Hopgood (incumbent)	24,375	69.55
Republican	Fred Kalsic	8,863	25.29
Constitution	Rick Butkowski	1,807	5.16
Total votes		35,045	100.0
Democratic hold			

23rd District (Wayne (Brownstown Township, Flat Rock, Gibraltar, Grosse Ile Township, Huron Township, Rockwood, Sumpter Township, Woodhaven))
Party	Candidate	Votes	%
Democratic	Kathleen Law	24,004	54.64
Republican	Bill Vollenweider	19,202	43.71
Libertarian	Richard Secula	727	1.65
Total votes		43,933	100.0
Democratic hold			

24th District (Macomb (Harrison Township, Lake Township, St. Clair Shores))
Party	Candidate	Votes	%
Republican	Jack Brandenburg (incumbent)	29,111	62.7
Democratic	Dan Foukes	17,317	37.3
Total votes		46,428	100.0
Republican hold			

25th District (Macomb (south Sterling Heights, north Warren))
Party	Candidate	Votes	%
Democratic	Steve Bieda (incumbent)	25,497	61.05
Republican	Michael Wiecek	16,269	38.95
Total votes		41,766	100.0
Democratic hold			

26th District (Oakland (Madison Heights, Royal Oak))
Party	Candidate	Votes	%
Democratic	Marie Donigan	22,780	49.08
Republican	Carlo Ginotti	20,954	45.15
Independent	Dale Savage	1,529	3.29
Libertarian	Sara Sjoberg	1,148	2.47
Total votes		46,411	100.0
Democratic hold			

27th District (Oakland (Berkley, Ferndale, Hazel Park, Huntington Woods, north Oak Park, Pleasant Ridge))
Party	Candidate	Votes	%
Democratic	Andy Meisner (incumbent)	32,447	73.1
Republican	William Axtell	10,755	24.23
Libertarian	Lloyd Sherman	1,188	2.68
Total votes		44,390	100.0
Democratic hold			

28th District (Macomb (south Warren, Center Line))
Party	Candidate	Votes	%
Democratic	Lisa Wojno (incumbent)	24,288	70.23
Republican	Timothy Knue	9,748	28.19
Libertarian	Stephen Samoranski	547	1.58
Total votes		34,583	100.0
Democratic hold			

=== Districts 29-55 ===
29th District (Oakland (Auburn Hills, Pontiac))
Party	Candidate	Votes	%
Democratic	Clarence Phillips	22,272	74.54
Republican	Samantha Moffett	7,607	25.46
Total votes		29,879	100.0
Democratic hold			

30th District (Macomb (north Sterling Heights, Utica))
Party	Candidate	Votes	%
Republican	Tory Rocca	22,725	53.85
Democratic	Roger Maceroni	19,474	46.15
Total votes		42,199	100.0
Republican hold			

31st District (Macomb (Clinton Township—excluding northeast portion, north Fraser, Mount Clemens))
Party	Candidate	Votes	%
Democratic	Fred Miller	21,274	54.91
Republican	William Morelli	16,523	42.64
Libertarian	James Miller	949	2.45
Total votes		38,746	100.0
Democratic hold			

32nd District (Macomb (Armada Township, Chesterfield Township, Lenox Township, south Memphis, New Baltimore, Richmond—excluding portion outside county, Richmond Township), St. Clair (Columbus Township, Ira Township, Kimball Township, Wales Township))
Party	Candidate	Votes	%
Republican	Dan Acciavatti	28,988	65.7
Democratic	Michael Landsiedel	14,131	32.02
Libertarian	Joseph Zemens	1,006	2.28
Total votes		44,125	100.0
Republican hold			

33rd District (Macomb (Macomb Township, Ray Township, northwest Clinton Township))
Party	Candidate	Votes	%
Republican	Leon Drolet (incumbent)	30,292	60.66
Democratic	Gary Cynowa	19,644	39.34
Total votes		49,936	100.0
Republican hold			

34th District (Genesee (north Flint))
Party	Candidate	Votes	%
Democratic	Brenda Clack (incumbent)	26,658	88.67
Republican	Steven Mays	3,407	11.33
Total votes		30,065	100.0
Democratic hold			

35th District (Oakland (Lathrup Village, southwest Oak Park, Royal Oak Township, Southfield))
Party	Candidate	Votes	%
Democratic	Paul Condino	39,799	86.76
Republican	Alan Malisow	6,075	13.24
Total votes		45,874	100.0
Democratic hold			

36th District (Macomb (Bruce Township, Shelby Township, Washington Township))
Party	Candidate	Votes	%
Republican	Brian Palmer	30,305	64.76
Democratic	Robert Murphy	16,491	35.24
Total votes		46,796	100.0
Republican hold			

37th District (Oakland (Farmington, Farmington Hills))
Party	Candidate	Votes	%
Democratic	Aldo Vagnozzi (incumbent)	26,730	56.63
Republican	William Largent	20,468	43.37
Total votes		47,198	100.0
Democratic hold			

38th District (Oakland (Lyon Township, Northville-excluding portion outside county, Novi, Novi Township, South Lyon, Walled Lake, Wixom))
Party	Candidate	Votes	%
Republican	Craig DeRoche (incumbent)	27,406	61.39
Democratic	Joan Morgan	17,234	38.61
Total votes		44,640	100.0
Republican hold			

39th District (Oakland (Commerce Township, south West Bloomfield Township))
Party	Candidate	Votes	%
Republican	David Law	24,998	52.4
Democratic	Michael Schwartz	21,618	45.31
Libertarian	Nathan Allen	1,092	2.29
Total votes		47,708	100.0
Republican hold			

40th District (Oakland (Birmingham, Bloomfield Hills, Bloomfield Township, Keego Harbor, Orchard Lake Village, Southfield Township, Sylvan Lake))
Party	Candidate	Votes	%
Republican	Shelley Taub	39,231	100
Total votes		39,231	100.0
Republican hold			

41st District (Oakland (Clawson, Troy))
Party	Candidate	Votes	%
Republican	Bob Gosselin	26,767	57.64
Democratic	Jim Blundo	19,674	42.36
Total votes		46,441	100.0
Republican hold			

42nd District (Macomb (Eastpointe, south Fraser, Roseville))
Party	Candidate	Votes	%
Democratic	Frank Accavitti	27,267	72.2
Republican	Greg Flemin	10,499	27.8
Total votes		37,766	100.0
Democratic hold			

43rd District (Oakland (Lake Angelus, Waterford Township, northwest West Bloomfield Township))
Party	Candidate	Votes	%
Republican	Fran Amos (incumbent)	23,665	56.54
Democratic	Scott Hudson	18,193	43.46
Total votes		41,858	100.0
Republican hold			

44th District (Oakland (Highland Township, Independence Township, Springfield Township, Clarkston Village, White Lake Township))
Party	Candidate	Votes	%
Republican	John Stakoe	33,596	67.88
Democratic	Bill Scrase	14,498	29.29
Constitution	Ronald Monroe	1,400	2.83
Total votes		49,494	100.0
Republican hold			

45th District (Oakland (Oakland Township, Rochester Hills, Rochester))
Party	Candidate	Votes	%
Republican	John Garfield	31,993	63.12
Democratic	Thomas Werth	17,363	34.26
Libertarian	Retta Fontana	1,326	2.62
Total votes		50,682	100.0
Republican hold			

46th District (Oakland (Addison Township, Brandon Township, Groveland Township, Holly Township, Orion Township, Oxford Township, Rose Township))
Party	Candidate	Votes	%
Republican	James Marleau	30,064	63.08
Democratic	Daniel Myslakowski	17,593	36.92
Total votes		47,657	100.0
Republican hold			

47th District (Livingston (Cohoctah Township, Conway Township, Deerfield Township, Hamburg Township, Handy Township, Hartland Township, Howell, Howell Township, Iosco Township, Marion Township--small northeast portion, Putnam Township, Tyrone Township, Unadilla Township
Party	Candidate	Votes	%
Republican	Joe Hune (incumbent)	32,160	70.82
Democratic	Edmund Senkowski	13,248	29.18
Total votes		45,408	100.0
Republican hold			

48th District (Genesee (Clayton Township--northwest half, Clio, Flushing, Flushing Township, Montrose, Montrose Township, Mount Morris, Mount Morris Township, Thetford Township, Vienna Township))
Party	Candidate	Votes	%
Democratic	John Gleason (incumbent)	30,834	72.82
Republican	Donald Wenk	11,506	27.18
Total votes		42,340	100.0
Democratic hold			

49th District (Genesee (Clayton Township--southeast half, south Flint, Flint Township, Gaines Township, Swartz Creek))
Party	Candidate	Votes	%
Democratic	Lee Gonzales	26,865	69.92
Republican	Dan Parks	11,555	30.08
Total votes		38,420	100.0
Democratic hold			

50th District (Genesee (Burton, Davison, Davison Township, Genesee Township, Richfield Township))
Party	Candidate	Votes	%
Democratic	Paula Zelenko (incumbent)	26,427	64.76
Republican	Fred Mac Fortner	14,380	35.24
Total votes		40,807	100.0
Democratic hold			

51st District (Genesee (Argentine Township, Atlas Township, Fenton, Fenton Township, Grand Blanc, Grand Blanc Township, Linden, Mundy Township))
Party	Candidate	Votes	%
Republican	Dave Robertson (incumbent)	28,798	54.59
Democratic	Steven Robinson	23,951	45.41
Total votes		52,749	100.0
Republican hold			

52nd District (Washtenaw (north Ann Arbor, north Ann Arbor Township, Bridgewater Township, Dexter Township, Freedom Township, Lima Township, Lodi Township, Lyndon Township, Manchester Township, Northfield Township, Saline, Scio Township--most, Sharon Township, Sylvan T
Party	Candidate	Votes	%
Democratic	Pam Byrnes	23,951	45.41
Republican	Joseph Yekulis	24,669	45.34
Total votes		48,620	100.0
Democratic gain from Republican			

53rd District (Washtenaw (south Ann Arbor, south Ann Arbor Township))
Party	Candidate	Votes	%
Democratic	Chris Kolb (incumbent)	36,745	80.1
Republican	Erik Sheagren	9,127	19.9
Total votes		45,872	100.0
Democratic hold			

54th District (Washtenaw (Augusta Township, Salem Township, Superior Township, Ypsilanti, Ypsilanti Township))
Party	Candidate	Votes	%
Democratic	Alma Wheeler Smith	28,568	67.82
Republican	Jason Myers	12,698	30.14
Libertarian	David Raaflaub	860	2.04
Total votes		42,126	100.0
Democratic hold			

55th District (Monroe (Beford Township, Dundee Township, Erie Township, Milan, Milan Township, Petersburg, Summerfield Township, Whiteford Township), Washtenaw (Milan, Pittsfield Township, Saline Township, York Township))
Party	Candidate	Votes	%
Democratic	Kathy Angerer	24,299	50.33
Republican	Matt Milosch	23,980	49.67
Total votes		48,279	100.0
Democratic gain from Republican			

=== Districts 56-83 ===
56th District (Monroe (Ash Township, Berlin Township, Exeter Township, Frenchtown Township, Ida Township, LaSalle Township, London Township, Luna Pier, Monroe, Monroe Township, Raisinville Township))
Party	Candidate	Votes	%
Democratic	Herb Kehrl	21,554	49.11
Republican	John Manor	20,671	47.1
Libertarian	Lance Piedmonte	1,068	2.43
Green	Robert Kull	594	1.35
Total votes		43,887	100.0
Democratic gain from Republican			

57th District (Lenawee (excluding Cambridge Township))
Party	Candidate	Votes	%
Democratic	Dudley Spade	25,183	58.81
Republican	David Abraham	17,640	41.19
Total votes		42,823	100.0
Democratic hold			

58th District (Branch, Hillsdale)
Party	Candidate	Votes	%
Republican	Bruce Caswell (incumbent)	25,945	72.73
Democratic	Jack Gabbard	9,726	27.27
Total votes		35,671	100.0
Republican hold			

59th District (Cass (excluding Dowagiac, Howard Township, Niles, Silver Creek Township, Wayne Township), St. Joseph)
Party	Candidate	Votes	%
Republican	Rick Shaffer	27,044	70.69
Democratic	Ed Pawlowski	11,211	29.31
Total votes		38,255	100.0
Republican hold			

60th District (Kalamazoo (Cooper Township, Kalamazoo, east Kalamazoo Township))
Party	Candidate	Votes	%
Democratic	Alexander Lipsey (incumbent)	24,473	68.48
Republican	Nick Fedesna	11,266	31.52
Total votes		35,739	100.0
Democratic hold			

61st District (Kalamazoo (Alamo Township, north Kalamazoo Township, Oshtemo Township, Parchment, Portage, Prairie Ronde Township, Texas Township))
Party	Candidate	Votes	%
Republican	Jack Hoogendyk (incumbent)	28,167	54.89
Democratic	James Houston	23,150	45.11
Total votes		51,317	100.0
Republican hold			

62nd District (Calhoun (Albion, Albion Township, Battle Creek, Burlington Township, Clarence Township, Clarendon Township, Convis Township, Eckford Township, Fredonia Township, Homer Township, Lee Township, Leroy Township, Marengo Township, Sheridan Township, Springfie
Party	Candidate	Votes	%
Republican	Mike Nofs (incumbent)	20,935	53.37
Democratic	Lynne Haley	18,289	46.63
Total votes		39,224	100.0
Republican hold			

63rd District (Calhoun (Bedford Township, Emmet Township, Fredonia Township--part, Marshall--most, Marshall Township, Newton Township, Pennfield Township), Kalamazoo (Brady Township, Charleston Township, Climax Township, Comstock Township, Galesburg, Pavilion Township,
Party	Candidate	Votes	%
Republican	Lorence Wenke (incumbent)	28,181	58.83
Democratic	James Geary	19,723	41.17
Total votes		47,904	100.0
Republican hold			

64th District (Jackson (Concord Township, Hanover Township, Jackson, Napoleon Township, Parma Township, Pulaski Township, Sandstone Township, Spring Arbor Township, Summit Township))
Party	Candidate	Votes	%
Republican	Rick Baxter	18,787	49.81
Democratic	Martin Griffin	18,429	48.87
Total votes		37,216	100.0
Republican hold			

65th District (Eaton (Brookfield Township, Eaton Rapids, Hamlin Township), Jackson (Blackman Township, Columbia Township, Grass Lake Township, Henrietta Township, Leoni Township, Liberty Township, Norvell Township, Rives Township, Springport Township, Tompkins Township
Party	Candidate	Votes	%
Republican	Leslie Mortimer	20,014	51.41
Democratic	Mike Simpson	18,915	48.59
Total votes		38,929	100.0
Republican hold			

66th District (Livingston (Brighton, Brighton Township, Genoa Township, Green Oak Township, Marion Township--part, Oceola Township), Oakland (Milford Township))
Party	Candidate	Votes	%
Republican	Chris Ward	35,623	71.17
Democratic	James W. Block	14,432	28.83
Total votes		50,055	100.0
Republican hold			

67th District (Ingham (Alaiedon Township, Aurelius Township, Bunker Hill Township, Delhi Charter Township, Ingham Township, southwest Lansing, Leroy Township, Leslie, Leslie Township, Locke Township, Mason, Onondaga Township, Stockbridge Township, Vevay Township, Wheat
Party	Candidate	Votes	%
Democratic	Dianne Byrum (incumbent)	25,709	54.8
Republican	Beth Chandler	21,205	45.2
Total votes		46,914	100.0
Democratic hold			

68th District (Ingham (Lansing—excluding southwest portion, Lansing Township))
Party	Candidate	Votes	%
Democratic	Michael Murphy (incumbent)	27,455	68.83
Republican	Mark Harm	11,550	28.95
Constitution	DelRae Finnerty	886	2.22
Total votes		39,891	100.0
Democratic hold			

69th District (Ingham (east East Lansing, Williamston Township--most))
Party	Candidate	Votes	%
Democratic	Gretchen Whitmer (incumbent)	26,828	65.65
Republican	Angela Lindsay	14,037	34.35
Total votes		40,865	100.0
Democratic hold			

Libertarian Party (US) Lloyd Sherman 0 0

70th District (Ionia (Belding, Berlin Township--small part, Ionia, Ionia Township--part, Keene Township, Orleans Township, Otisco Township), Montcalm)
Party	Candidate	Votes	%
Republican	Judy Emmons (incumbent)	22,744	65.97
Democratic	Henry Sanchez	11,732	34.03
Total votes		34,476	100.0
Republican hold			

71st District (Eaton (excluding Brookfield Township, Eaton Rapids, Hamlin Township))
Party	Candidate	Votes	%
Republican	Rick Jones	28,643	59.22
Democratic	Ryan Latourette	18,628	38.51
Libertarian	Mark Powell	1,098	2.27
Total votes		48,369	100.0
Republican hold			

72nd District (Kent (Caledonia Township, Cascade Township, Gaines Township, Kentwood))
Party	Candidate	Votes	%
Republican	Glenn Steil	33,283	68.42
Democratic	Thomas Burke	14,594	30
Libertarian	William Wenzel	765	1.57
Total votes		48,642	100.0
Republican hold			

73rd District (Kent (Algoma Township, Cannon Township, Cedar Springs, Courtland Township, Nelson Township, Oakfield Township, Plainfield Township, Rockford, Solon Township, Sparta Township, Spencer Township, Tyrone Township))
Party	Candidate	Votes	%
Republican	Tom Pearce	35,035	68.04
Democratic	Frederick Clowney	15,277	29.67
Libertarian	Ron Heeren	1,179	2.29
Total votes		51,491	100.0
Republican hold			

74th District (Kent (Alpine Township, Grandville), Ottawa (Coopersville, Crockery Township, Georgetown Township, Polkton Township, Tallmadge Township, Wright Township))
Party	Candidate	Votes	%
Republican	William Van Regenmorter (incumbent)	38,380	75.1
Democratic	Dawn Sloboda	12,009	23.5
Libertarian	Tracey Gelineau	719	1.41
Total votes		51,108	100.0
Republican hold			

75th District (Kent (east Grand Rapids))
Party	Candidate	Votes	%
Republican	Jerry Kooiman	21,273	52.22
Democratic	Christopher Vogt	19,465	47.78
Total votes		40,738	100.0
Republican hold			

76th District (Kent (west Grand Rapids))
Party	Candidate	Votes	%
Democratic	Michael Sak (incumbent)	21,091	67.42
Republican	Holly Zuidema	9,591	30.66
Green	Roger McClary	600	1.92
Total votes		31,282	100.0
Democratic hold			

77th District (Kent (Byron Township, Wyoming))
Party	Candidate	Votes	%
Republican	Kevin Green	26,158	66.1
Democratic	Albert Abbasse	11,459	28.96
Independent	John Stedman	1,618	4.09
Libertarian	Wayne Dial	339	0.86
Total votes		39,574	100.0
Republican hold			

78th District (Berrien (Baroda Township, Berrien Township, Bertland Township, Buchanan, Buchanan Township, Chikaming Township, Galien Township, New Buffalo, New Buffalo Township, Niles, Niles Township, Oronoko Township, Pipestone Township, Three Oaks Township, Weesaw T
Party	Candidate	Votes	%
Republican	Neal Nitz (incumbent)	21,884	58.64
Democratic	Michael Gordon	15,434	41.36
Total votes		37,318	100.0
Republican hold			

79th District (Berrien (Bainbridge Township, Benton Charter Township, Benton Harbor, Bridgeman, Coloma, Coloma Township, Hager Township, Lake Charter Township, Lincoln Township, Royalton Township, Sodus Township, St. Joseph Charter Township, St. Joseph, Watervliet, Wat
Party	Candidate	Votes	%
Republican	John Proos	26,377	62.68
Democratic	Princella Tobias	15,703	37.32
Total votes		42,080	100.0
Republican hold			

80th District (Allegan (Otsego, Otsego Township, Watson Township), Van Buren)
Party	Candidate	Votes	%
Republican	Tonya Schuitmaker	21,610	58.3
Democratic	Art Toy	15,459	41.7
Total votes		37,069	100.0
Republican hold			

81st District (St. Clair (Algonac, Berlin Township, Brockway Township, Casco Township, China Township, Clay Township, Clyde Township, Cottrellville Township, East China Township, Emmet Township, Grant Township, Greenwood Township, Kenockee Township, Lynn Township, Mari
Party	Candidate	Votes	%
Republican	Phil Pavlov	26,277	56.43
Democratic	Mary Patterson	20,290	43.57
Total votes		46,567	100.0
Republican hold			

82nd District (Lapeer)
Party	Candidate	Votes	%
Republican	John Stahl	24,292	57.79
Democratic	David Okasinski	16,215	38.57
Constitution	Laura Erpelding	1,529	3.64
Total votes		42,036	100.0
Republican hold			

83rd District (Sanilac, St. Clair (Burtchville Township, Fort Gratiot Township, Port Huron))
Party	Candidate	Votes	%
Democratic	John Espinoza	22,256	55.5
Republican	Paul Muxlow	17,844	44.5
Total votes		40,100	100.0
Democratic gain from Republican			

=== Districts 84-110 ===
84th District (Huron, Tuscola)
Party	Candidate	Votes	%
Republican	Tom Meyer (incumbent)	27,917	63.62
Democratic	Steve Montle	15,183	34.6
Green	Rebekah Mikkelson	783	1.78
Total votes		43,883	100.0
Republican hold			

85th District (Clinton (Bath Township, Dewitt Township--part, Ovid Township, Victor Township, Shiawassee))
Party	Candidate	Votes	%
Republican	Dick Ball	23,191	52.67
Democratic	Mike Powers	20,011	45.45
Constitution	George Zimmer	830	1.88
Total votes		44,032	100.0
Republican hold			

86th District (Kent (Ada Township, Bowne Township, East Grand Rapids, north-central Grand Rapids, Grand Rapids Township, Grattan Township, Lowell, Lowell Township, Vergennes Township, Walker))
Party	Candidate	Votes	%
Republican	Dave Hildenbrand	34,664	67.18
Democratic	James Turner	15,994	31
Libertarian	Bill Gelineau	938	1.82
Total votes		51,596	100.0
Republican hold			

87th District (Barry, Ionia (Berlin Township--most, Boston Township, Campbell Township, Danby Township, Ionia--small part, Ionia Township--most, Lyons Township, North Plains Township, Odessa Township, Orange Township, Portland, Portland Township, Ronald Township, Sebew
Party	Candidate	Votes	%
Republican	Gary Newell	28,482	63
Democratic	David Brinkert	15,689	34.71
Constitution	Phillip Adams	1,035	2.29
Total votes		45,206	100.0
Republican hold			

88th District (Allegan (excluding Watson Township, Otsego, Otsego Township))
Party	Candidate	Votes	%
Republican	Fulton Sheen	31,300	67.19
Democratic	Marty Jo Fleser	15,282	32.81
Total votes		46,582	100.0
Republican hold			

89th District (Ottawa (Allendale Township, Ferrysburg, Grand Haven, Grand Haven Township, Olive Township, Park Township, Port Sheldon Township, Robinson Township, Spring Lake Township))
Party	Candidate	Votes	%
Republican	Barb Vander Veen	32,769	71.78
Democratic	Rebecca Arenas	12,884	28.22
Total votes		45,653	100.0
Republican hold			

90th District (Ottawa (Blendon, Holland--part within county, Holland Township, Hudsonville, Jamestown Township, Zeeland, Zeeland Township))
Party	Candidate	Votes	%
Republican	Bill Huizenga (incumbent)	32,383	78.56
Democratic	Jo Bartlett	7,607	18.45
Libertarian	Mariano Diaz	1,233	2.99
Total votes		41,223	100.0
Republican hold			

91st District (Muskegon (Blue Lake Township, Casnovia Township, Cedar Creek Township, Dalton Township, Egelston Township, Fruitport Township, Holton Township, Montague, Montague Township, Moorland Township, Ravenna Township, Roosevelt Park, Sullivan Township, White Riv
Party	Candidate	Votes	%
Republican	David Farhat	22,327	52.03
Democratic	Nancy Frye	20,587	47.97
Total votes		42,914	100.0
Republican hold			

92nd District (Muskegon (Fruitland Township, Laketon Township, Muskegon Heights, Muskegon, Muskegon Township, North Muskegon))
Party	Candidate	Votes	%
Democratic	Doug Bennett	22,498	65.59
Republican	Bob Cutler	11,804	34.41
Total votes		34,302	100.0
Democratic hold			

93rd District (Clinton (excluding Ovid Township, Victor Township, Bath Township, Dewitt Township--part), Gratiot)
Party	Candidate	Votes	%
Republican	Scott Hummel	29,138	66.61
Democratic	Monica Birchman	14,606	33.39
Total votes		43,744	100.0
Republican hold			

94th District (Saginaw (Albee Township, Birch Run Township, Blumfield Township, Chesaning Township, Frankenmuth, Frankenmuth Township, James Township, Maple Grove Township, Saginaw Township, St. Charles Township, Swan Creek Township, Taymouth Township, Thomas Township)
Party	Candidate	Votes	%
Republican	Roger Kahn	28,925	59.05
Democratic	Timothy Muter	20,061	40.95
Total votes		48,986	100.0
Republican hold			

95th District (Saginaw (Bridgeport Township, Buena Vista Township, Saginaw, Spaulding Township))
Party	Candidate	Votes	%
Democratic	Carl M. Williams (incumbent)	25,233	77.4
Republican	Andrew Wendt	7,366	22.6
Total votes		32,599	100.0
Democratic hold			

96th District (Bay (Auburn, Bangor Township, Bay City, Beaver Township, Essexville, Frankenlust Township, Hampton Township, Merritt Township, Midland—portion within county, Monitor Township, Portsmouth Township, Williams Township))
Party	Candidate	Votes	%
Democratic	Jeff Mayes	29,305	63.58
Republican	Steven Goss	16,790	36.42
Total votes		46,095	100.0
Democratic hold			

97th District (Arenac, Bay (Fraser Township, Garfield Township, Gibson Township, Kawkawlin Township, Mount Forest Township, Pinconning, Pinconning Township), Clare, Gladwin)
Party	Candidate	Votes	%
Republican	Tim Moore	22,321	51.66
Democratic	Jennifer Elkins	20,883	48.34
Total votes		43,204	100.0
Republican gain from Democratic			

98th District (Midland (Homer Township, Ingersoll Township, Larkin Township—small part, Lincoln Township—small part, Midland—almost all, Midland Township, Mount Haley Township), Saginaw (Brady Township, Brant Township, Carrollton Township, Chapin Township, Fremont Town
Party	Candidate	Votes	%
Republican	John Moolenaar (incumbent)	28,431	65.38
Democratic	Stacy Jones	15,057	34.62
Total votes		43,488	100.0
Republican hold			

99th District (Isabella, Midland (Coleman, Edenville Township, Geneva Township, Greendale Township, Hope Township, Jasper Township, Jerome Township, Larkin Township—almost all, Lee Township, Lincoln Township—almost all, Mills Township, Porter Township, Warren Township)
Party	Candidate	Votes	%
Republican	Bill Caul	21,486	56.78
Democratic	Sharon Tilmann	16,352	43.22
Total votes		37,838	100.0
Republican hold			

100th District (Lake, Newaygo, Oceana)
Party	Candidate	Votes	%
Republican	Goeff Hansen	23,270	61.02
Democratic	Ronald Griffin	14,863	38.98
Total votes		38,133	100.0
Republican hold			

101st District (Benzie, Leelanau, Manistee, Mason)
Party	Candidate	Votes	%
Republican	David Palsrok	26,990	55.71
Democratic	Richard Gebhard	21,457	44.29
Total votes		48,447	100.0
Republican hold			

102nd District (Mecosta, Osceola, Wexford)
Party	Candidate	Votes	%
Republican	Darwin Booher	26,000	63.79
Democratic	Paul Challender	14,761	36.21
Total votes		40,761	100.0
Republican hold			

103rd District (Iosco, Missaukee, Ogemaw, Roscommon)
Party	Candidate	Votes	%
Democratic	Joel Sheltrown	25,535	56.51
Republican	Bruce Rendon	19,648	43.49
Total votes		45,183	100.0
Democratic hold			

104th District (Grand Traverse, Kalkaska)
Party	Candidate	Votes	%
Republican	Howard Walker (incumbent)	33,482	66.58
Democratic	Tom Karas	16,804	33.42
Total votes		50,286	100.0
Republican hold			

105th District (Antrim, Charlevoix, Cheboygan (excluding Koehler Township, Tuscarora Township), Otsego)
Party	Candidate	Votes	%
Republican	Kevin Elsenheimer	30,765	62.27
Democratic	Jim McKimmy	18,644	37.73
Total votes		49,409	100.0
Republican hold			

106th District (Alcona, Alpena, Crawford, Montmorency, Oscoda, Presque Isle)
Party	Candidate	Votes	%
Democratic	Matt Gillard (incumbent)	25,834	58.27
Republican	Richard Fortier	18,498	41.73
Total votes		44,332	100.0
Democratic hold			

107th District (Cheboygan (Koehler Township, Tuscarora Township), Chippewa, Emmet, Mackinac)
Party	Candidate	Votes	%
Democratic	Gary McDowell	22,293	53.53
Republican	Walter North	19,353	46.47
Total votes		41,646	100.0
Democratic gain from Republican			

108th District (Delta, Dickinson, Menominee)
Party	Candidate	Votes	%
Republican	Tom Casperson (incumbent)	29,727	68.56
Democratic	Dennis Baldinelli	13,635	31.44
Total votes		43,362	100.0
Republican hold			

109th District (Alger, Luce, Marquette (excluding Powell Township, West Branch Township), Schoolcraft)
Party	Candidate	Votes	%
Democratic	Stephen Adamini (incumbent)	28,081	67.11
Republican	David Kaltenbach	13,760	32.89
Total votes		41,841	100.0
Democratic hold			

110th District (Baraga, Gogebic, Houghton, Iron, Keweenaw, Marquette (Powell Township), Ontonagon)
Party	Candidate	Votes	%
Democratic	Rich Brown (incumbent)	26,754	68.14
Republican	Patricia Ashcraft	9,845	25.07
Constitution	James Niemela	2,161	5.50
Independent	Travis Joseph Peterson	506	1.29
Total votes		39,266	100.0
Democratic hold			
