= 2002 Michigan House of Representatives election =

- November 5, 2002

All 110 seats in the Michigan House of Representatives 56 seats needed for a majority
	Majority party	Minority party
Leader	Rick Johnson	Dianne Byrum
Party	Republican	Democratic
Leader's seat	102nd District	68th District
Seats before	58	52
Seats after	63	47
Seat change	▲5	▼5
Popular vote	1,520,216	1,498,865
Percentage	50.27%	49.56%
- Results: Republican gain Democratic gain Republican hold Democratic hold
Speaker before election
Rick Johnson
Republican
Elected Speaker
Rick Johnson
Republican

The 2002 Michigan House of Representatives elections were held on November 5, 2002, with partisan primaries to select the parties' nominees in the various districts on August 6, 2002.

== Predictions ==
Source	Ranking	As of
The Cook; Political Report	Lean R	October 4, 2002

== Results ==
=== Districts 1-28 ===
1st District (Wayne (Harper Woods, Grosse Pointe Woods, Grosse Pointe Township, Grosse Pointe Farms, Grosse Pointe, Grosse Pointe Park, far east Detroit))
Party	Candidate	Votes	%
Republican	Ed Gaffney	19,250	56.4
Democratic	David Paul Putrycus	14,880	43.6
Total votes		34,130	100.0
Republican hold			

2nd District (Wayne (northeast Detroit))
Party	Candidate	Votes	%
Democratic	Ken Daniels	14,039	95.03
Republican	Herbert Russell	734	4.97
Total votes		14,773	100.0
Democratic hold			

3rd District (Wayne (southeast Detroit))
Party	Candidate	Votes	%
Democratic	Artina Tinsley Hardman (incumbent)	16,520	95.82
Republican	Michael Embry	720	4.18
Total votes		17,240	100.0
Democratic hold			

4th District (Wayne (south-central Detroit))
Party	Candidate	Votes	%
Democratic	Mary Waters (incumbent)	19,337	96.18
Republican	Wayne Senior	767	3.82
Total votes		20,104	100.0
Democratic hold			

5th District (Wayne (north Detroit, Highland Park, Hamtramck))
Party	Candidate	Votes	%
Democratic	Bill McConico (incumbent)	13,967	92.83
Republican	Richard Maziarz	1,078	7.17
Total votes		15,045	100.0
Democratic hold			

6th District (Wayne (south-central Detroit))
Party	Candidate	Votes	%
Democratic	Marsha Cheeks	17,428	93.71
Republican	Dorothy Patterson	775	4.17
Green	Margaret Guttshall	394	2.12
Total votes		18,597	100.0
Democratic hold			

7th District (Wayne (north-central Detroit))
Party	Candidate	Votes	%
Democratic	Virgil Smith	21,165	96.11
Republican	Dolores Brodersen	857	3.89
Total votes		22,022	100.0
Democratic hold			

8th District (Wayne (northwest Detroit))
Party	Candidate	Votes	%
Democratic	Alma Stallworth	27,707	97.34
Republican	Melvin Byrd	744	2.61
Write-in	Doris Massey-Stuppard	13	0.05
Total votes		28,464	100.0
Democratic hold			

9th District (Wayne (far northwest Detroit))
Party	Candidate	Votes	%
Democratic	Tupac Hunter	22,098	94.47
Republican	Richard Zeile	1,294	5.53
Total votes		23,392	100.0
Democratic hold			

10th District (Wayne (west Detroit))
Party	Candidate	Votes	%
Democratic	Triette Lipsey Reeves (incumbent)	16,005	89.22
Republican	John Nazars	1,535	8.56
Green	Alan Jacobson	398	2.22
Total votes		17,938	100.0
Democratic hold			

11th District (Wayne (west-central Detroit))
Party	Candidate	Votes	%
Democratic	Morris Hood III	19,906	94.7
Republican	Charles Powell	888	4.22
Green	Garry Herring	227	1.08
Total votes		21,021	100.0
Democratic hold			

12th District (Wayne (southwest Detroit))
Party	Candidate	Votes	%
Democratic	Steve Tobocman	8,406	90.19
Republican	Chester Calka	914	9.81
Total votes		9,320	100.0
Democratic hold			

13th District (Wayne (Riverview, Southgate, Trenton, Wyandotte))
Party	Candidate	Votes	%
Democratic	Barbara Farrah	17,472	64.74
Republican	Darrell Stasik	8,905	32.99
Libertarian	Eric Gordon	613	2.27
Total votes		26,990	100.0
Democratic hold			

14th District (Wayne (Ecorse, Lincoln Park, Melvindale, River Rouge, south Allen Park))
Party	Candidate	Votes	%
Democratic	William O'Neil	17,277	73.95
Republican	Chris O'Loughlin	6,085	26.05
Total votes		23,362	100.0
Democratic hold			

15th District (Wayne (Dearborn—excluding northeast tip))
Party	Candidate	Votes	%
Republican	Gary Woronchak (incumbent)	19,227	100
Total votes		19,227	100.0
Republican hold			

16th District (Wayne (north Allen Park, Dearborn Heights--southwest tip, Garden City, Inkster))
Party	Candidate	Votes	%
Democratic	Jim Plakas	19,693	75.16
Republican	Eric Homeier	5,595	21.35
Libertarian	David Nagy	913	3.48
Total votes		26,201	100.0
Democratic hold			

17th District (Wayne (Dearborn Heights—excluding southwest tip, Livonia--southeast tip, Redford Township))
Party	Candidate	Votes	%
Democratic	Daniel S. Paletko	14,772	49.62
Republican	R. Miles Handy III	14,091	47.33
Libertarian	Christopher Gonzalez	907	3.05
Total votes		29,770	100.0
Democratic hold			

18th District (Wayne (Westland))
Party	Candidate	Votes	%
Democratic	Glenn Anderson	14,619	70.16
Republican	Kip Lipford	6,218	29.84
Total votes		20,837	100.0
Democratic hold			

19th District (Wayne (Livonia—excluding southeast tip))
Party	Candidate	Votes	%
Republican	John R. Pastor	22,170	62.85
Democratic	Kerry Lowry	12,210	34.61
Libertarian	Mike Shesterkin	895	2.54
Total votes		35,275	100.0
Republican hold			

20th District (Wayne (Northville--portion within county, Northville Township, Plymouth, Plymouth Township, east Canton Township, Wayne))
Party	Candidate	Votes	%
Republican	John Stewart (incumbent)	19,910	61.23
Democratic	Mark Blackwell	11,581	35.61
Libertarian	James Dean	1,027	3.16
Total votes		32,518	100.0
Republican hold			

21st District (Wayne (Belleville, Van Buren Township, Canton Township—excluding eastern slice))
Party	Candidate	Votes	%
Republican	Phil LaJoy	15,591	53.76
Democratic	Mark Slavens	12,769	44.03
Libertarian	Ken Century	640	2.21
Total votes		29,000	100.0
Republican hold			

22nd District (Wayne (Romulus, Taylor))
Party	Candidate	Votes	%
Democratic	Hoon-Yung Hopgood	14,042	68.85
Republican	Ronald Vaughan	5,696	27.93
Libertarian	Charles Kainz	657	3.22
Total votes		20,395	100.0
Democratic hold			

23rd District (Wayne (Brownstown Township, Flat Rock, Gibraltar, Grosse Ile Township, Huron Township, Rockwood, Sumpter Township, Woodhaven))
Party	Candidate	Votes	%
Democratic	Kathleen Law	13,430	49.46
Republican	Douglas Jones	13,171	48.51
Libertarian	Richard Secula	552	2.03
Total votes		27,153	100.0
Democratic hold			

24th District (Macomb (Harrison Township, Lake Township, St. Clair Shores))
Party	Candidate	Votes	%
Republican	Jack Brandenburg	17,697	53.56
Democratic	Frank Benson	14,296	43.27
Libertarian	Erin Stahl	1,049	3.17
Total votes		33,042	100.0
Republican gain from Democratic			

25th District (Macomb (south Sterling Heights, north Warren))
Party	Candidate	Votes	%
Democratic	Steve Bieda	16,910	56.74
Republican	Keith Sadowski	12,893	43.26
Total votes		29,803	100.0
Democratic hold			

26th District (Oakland (Madison Heights, Royal Oak))
Party	Candidate	Votes	%
Democratic	Dave Woodward	19,058	60.55
Republican	Josh West	11,697	37.16
Green	Dan Karam	722	2.29
Total votes		31,477	100.0
Democratic hold			

27th District (Oakland (Berkley, Ferndale, Hazel Park, Huntington Woods, north Oak Park, Pleasant Ridge))
Party	Candidate	Votes	%
Democratic	Andy Meisner	21,037	70.5
Republican	Keith Sanford	7,927	26.57
Green	Art Myatt	875	2.93
Total votes		29,839	100.0
Democratic hold			

28th District (Macomb (south Warren, Center Line))
Party	Candidate	Votes	%
Democratic	Lisa Wojno	14,998	67.27
Republican	Scott Stevens	6,883	30.87
Libertarian	James Allison	415	1.86
Total votes		22,296	100.0
Democratic hold			

=== Districts 29-55 ===
29th District (Oakland (Auburn Hills, Pontiac))
Party	Candidate	Votes	%
Democratic	Clarence Phillips	13,675	76.11
Republican	Tom March	4,292	23.89
Total votes		17,967	100.0
Democratic gain from Republican			

30th District (Macomb (north Sterling Heights, Utica))
Party	Candidate	Votes	%
Republican	Sal Rocca (incumbent)	17,243	62.4
Democratic	Joe McHugh	10,392	37.6
Total votes		27,635	100.0
Republican hold			

31st District (Macomb (Clinton Township—excluding northeast portion, north Fraser, Mount Clemens))
Party	Candidate	Votes	%
Democratic	Paul Gieleghem	14,663	60.13
Republican	Sheryl Russo	9,021	36.99
Libertarian	James Miller	701	2.87
Total votes		24,385	100.0
Democratic hold			

32nd District (Macomb (Armada Township, Chesterfield Township, Lenox Township, south Memphis, New Baltimore, Richmond—excluding portion outside county, Richmond Township), St. Clair (Columbus Township, Ira Township, Kimball Township, Wales Township))
Party	Candidate	Votes	%
Republican	Dan Acciavatti	15,405	56.26
Democratic	John Hertel	11,975	43.74
Total votes		27,380	100.0
Republican hold			

33rd District (Macomb (Macomb Township, Ray Township, northwest Clinton Township))
Party	Candidate	Votes	%
Republican	Leon Drolet (incumbent)	17,856	60.17
Democratic	Anthony Ventimiglia	11,822	39.83
Total votes		29,678	100.0
Republican hold			

34th District (Genesee (north Flint))
Party	Candidate	Votes	%
Democratic	Brenda Clack	16,038	87.59
Republican	Rudolph Willis	2,273	12.41
Total votes		18,311	100.0
Democratic hold			

35th District (Oakland (Lathrup Village, southwest Oak Park, Royal Oak Township, Southfield))
Party	Candidate	Votes	%
Democratic	Paul Condino	25,876	80.18
Republican	Sylvia Jordan	6,397	19.82
Total votes		32,273	100.0
Democratic hold			

36th District (Macomb (Bruce Township, Shelby Township, Washington Township))
Party	Candidate	Votes	%
Republican	Brian Palmer	20,013	67.36
Democratic	Robert Denison	9,699	32.64
Total votes		29,712	100.0
Republican gain from Democratic			

37th District (Oakland (Farmington, Farmington Hills))
Party	Candidate	Votes	%
Democratic	Aldo Vagnozzi	17,976	52.46
Republican	Valerie Knol	16,290	47.54
Total votes		34,266	100.0
Democratic gain from Republican			

38th District (Oakland (Lyon Township, Northville-excluding portion outside county, Novi, Novi Township, South Lyon, Walled Lake, Wixom))
Party	Candidate	Votes	%
Republican	Craig DeRoche	18,561	65.05
Democratic	Linda Premo	9,973	34.95
Total votes		28,534	100.0
Republican hold			

39th District (Oakland (Commerce Township, south West Bloomfield Township))
Party	Candidate	Votes	%
Republican	Marc Shulman	19,691	60.75
Democratic	Stuart Brickner	12,722	39.25
Total votes		32,413	100.0
Republican hold			

40th District (Oakland (Birmingham, Bloomfield Hills, Bloomfield Township, Keego Harbor, Orchard Lake Village, Southfield Township, Sylvan Lake))
Party	Candidate	Votes	%
Republican	Shelley Taub	25,625	62.41
Democratic	Shelli Weisberg	15,435	37.59
Total votes		41,060	100.0
Republican hold			

41st District (Oakland (Clawson, Troy))
Party	Candidate	Votes	%
Republican	John Pappageorge (incumbent)	22,631	68.97
Democratic	Richard Fischer, Jr.	9,514	29
Green	Bretton Jones	667	2.03
Total votes		32,812	100.0
Republican hold			

42nd District (Macomb (Eastpointe, south Fraser, Roseville))
Party	Candidate	Votes	%
Democratic	Frank Accavitti	15,746	64.85
Republican	Jim Riske	7,580	31.22
Libertarian	John Bonnell	955	3.93
Total votes		24,281	100.0
Democratic gain from Republican			

43rd District (Oakland (Lake Angelus, Waterford Township, northwest West Bloomfield Township))
Party	Candidate	Votes	%
Republican	Fran Amos	14,788	52.92
Democratic	Betty Fortino	13,157	47.08
Total votes		27,945	100.0
Republican gain from Democratic			

44th District (Oakland (Highland Township, Independence Township, Springfield Township, Clarkston Village, White Lake Township))
Party	Candidate	Votes	%
Republican	John Stakoe	22,788	70.04
Democratic	George Bryan	9,748	29.96
Total votes		32,536	100.0
Republican hold			

45th District (Oakland (Oakland Township, Rochester Hills, Rochester))
Party	Candidate	Votes	%
Republican	John Garfield	23,518	68.73
Democratic	John Kanaras	10,699	31.27
Total votes		34,217	100.0
Republican hold			

46th District (Oakland (Addison Township, Brandon Township, Groveland Township, Holly Township, Orion Township, Oxford Township, Rose Township))
Party	Candidate	Votes	%
Republican	Ruth Johnson (incumbent)	21,582	70.88
Democratic	Robert Reading	8,866	29.12
Total votes		30,448	100.0
Republican hold			

47th District (Livingston (Cohoctah Township, Conway Township, Deerfield Township, Hamburg Township, Handy Township, Hartland Township, Howell, Howell Township, Iosco Township, Marion Township--small northeast portion, Putnam Township, Tyrone Township, Unadilla Township))
Party	Candidate	Votes	%
Republican	Joe Hune	19,990	68.85
Democratic	Matt McGivney	9,043	31.15
Total votes		29,033	100.0
Republican gain from Democratic			

48th District (Genesee (Clayton Township--northwest half, Clio, Flushing, Flushing Township, Montrose, Montrose Township, Mount Morris, Mount Morris Township, Thetford Township, Vienna Township))
Party	Candidate	Votes	%
Democratic	John Gleason	19,600	69.21
Republican	Mike Gardner	8,720	30.79
Total votes		28,320	100.0
Democratic hold			

49th District (Genesee (Clayton Township--southeast half, south Flint, Flint Township, Gaines Township, Swartz Creek))
Party	Candidate	Votes	%
Democratic	Jack Minore (incumbent)	17,860	69.48
Republican	Courtney Garner	7,844	30.52
Total votes		25,704	100.0
Democratic hold			

50th District (Genesee (Burton, Davison, Davison Township, Genesee Township, Richfield Township))
Party	Candidate	Votes	%
Democratic	Paula Zelenko (incumbent)	17,121	67.8
Republican	Stephen Brang	8,131	32.2
Total votes		25,252	100.0
Democratic hold			

51st District (Genesee (Argentine Township, Atlas Township, Fenton, Fenton Township, Grand Blanc, Grand Blanc Township, Linden, Mundy Township))
Party	Candidate	Votes	%
Republican	Dave Robertson	16,675	49.94
Democratic	Patricia Lockwood	16,169	48.42
Green	Peter Ponzetti	549	1.64
Total votes		33,393	100.0
Republican gain from Democratic			

52nd District (Washtenaw (north Ann Arbor, north Ann Arbor Township, Bridgewater Township, Dexter Township, Freedom Township, Lima Township, Lodi Township, Lyndon Township, Manchester Township, Northfield Township, Saline, Scio Township--most, Sharon Township, Sylvan Township, Webster Township))
Party	Candidate	Votes	%
Republican	Gene DeRossett	19,579	53.39
Democratic	Pam Byrnes	17,091	46.61
Total votes		36,670	100.0
Republican gain from Democratic			

53rd District (Washtenaw (south Ann Arbor, south Ann Arbor Township))
Party	Candidate	Votes	%
Democratic	Chris Kolb (incumbent)	22,254	77.99
Republican	John Milroy	6,279	22.01
Total votes		28,533	100.0
Democratic hold			

54th District (Washtenaw (Augusta Township, Salem Township, Superior Township, Ypsilanti, Ypsilanti Township))
Party	Candidate	Votes	%
Democratic	Ruth Ann Jamnick (incumbent)	17,888	68.8
Republican	David Trent	8,112	31.2
Total votes		26,000	100.0
Democratic hold			

55th District (Monroe (Beford Township, Dundee Township, Erie Township, Milan, Milan Township, Petersburg, Summerfield Township, Whiteford Township), Washtenaw (Milan, Pittsfield Township, Saline Township, York Township))
Party	Candidate	Votes	%
Republican	Matt Milosch	14,287	52.98
Democratic	Gail Hauser-Hurley	12,679	47.02
Total votes		26,966	100.0
Republican hold			

=== Districts 56-83 ===
56th District (Monroe (Ash Township, Berlin Township, Exeter Township, Frenchtown Township, Ida Township, LaSalle Township, London Township, Luna Pier, Monroe, Monroe Township, Raisinville Township))
Party	Candidate	Votes	%
Republican	Randy Richardville (incumbent)	17,357	65.84
Democratic	Joshua Sacks	9,004	34.16
Total votes		26,361	100.0
Republican hold			

57th District (Lenawee (excluding Cambridge Township))
Party	Candidate	Votes	%
Democratic	Doug Spade (incumbent)	17,887	69.43
Republican	Fred Gallagher	7,877	30.57
Total votes		25,764	100.0
Democratic hold			

58th District (Branch, Hillsdale)
Party	Candidate	Votes	%
Republican	Bruce Caswell	14,836	66.87
Democratic	Annette Magda	7,349	33.13
Total votes		22,185	100.0
Republican hold			

59th District (Cass (excluding Dowagiac, Howard Township, Niles, Silver Creek Township, Wayne Township), St. Joseph)
Party	Candidate	Votes	%
Republican	Rick Shaffer	15,227	67.2
Democratic	Paula Beauchamp	7,432	32.8
Total votes		7,432	100.0
Republican hold			

60th District (Kalamazoo (Cooper Township, Kalamazoo, east Kalamazoo Township))
Party	Candidate	Votes	%
Democratic	Alexander Lipsey (incumbent)	13,671	64.01
Republican	Mark Liddle	7,687	35.99
Total votes		21,358	100.0
Democratic hold			

61st District (Kalamazoo (Alamo Township, north Kalamazoo Township, Oshtemo Township, Parchment, Portage, Prairie Ronde Township, Texas Township))
Party	Candidate	Votes	%
Republican	Jack Hoogendyk	18,720	56.53
Democratic	James Houston	14,398	43.47
Total votes		33,118	100.0
Republican hold			

62nd District (Calhoun (Albion, Albion Township, Battle Creek, Burlington Township, Clarence Township, Clarendon Township, Convis Township, Eckford Township, Fredonia Township, Homer Township, Lee Township, Leroy Township, Marengo Township, Sheridan Township, Springfield, Tekonsha Township))
Party	Candidate	Votes	%
Republican	Mike Nofs	13,619	53.19
Democratic	Ted Dearing	11,986	46.81
Total votes		25,605	100.0
Republican gain from Democratic			

63rd District (Calhoun (Bedford Township, Emmet Township, Fredonia Township--part, Marshall--most, Marshall Township, Newton Township, Pennfield Township), Kalamazoo (Brady Township, Charleston Township, Climax Township, Comstock Township, Galesburg, Pavilion Township, Richland Township, Ross Township, Schoolcraft Township, Wakeshma Township))
Party	Candidate	Votes	%
Republican	Lorence Wenke	18,093	56.52
Democratic	Judy Mackinder	13,918	43.48
Total votes		32,011	100.0
Republican hold			

64th District (Jackson (Concord Township, Hanover Township, Jackson, Napoleon Township, Parma Township, Pulaski Township, Sandstone Township, Spring Arbor Township, Summit Township))
Party	Candidate	Votes	%
Republican	Clark Bisbee (incumbent)	15,928	64.06
Democratic	Robert McNitt	8,936	35.94
Total votes		24,864	100.0
Republican hold			

65th District (Eaton (Brookfield Township, Eaton Rapids, Hamlin Township), Jackson (Blackman Township, Columbia Township, Grass Lake Township, Henrietta Township, Leoni Township, Liberty Township, Norvell Township, Rives Township, Springport Township, Tompkins Township, Waterloo Township), Lenawee (Cambridge Township))
Party	Candidate	Votes	%
Republican	Jerry Kratz	13,934	55.97
Democratic	Sharon Renier	10,960	44.03
Total votes		24,894	100.0
Republican hold			

66th District (Livingston (Brighton, Brighton Township, Genoa Township, Green Oak Township, Marion Township--part, Oceola Township), Oakland (Milford Township))
Party	Candidate	Votes	%
Republican	Chris Ward	23,599	72.78
Democratic	James W. Block	8,826	27.22
Total votes		32,425	100.0
Republican hold			

67th District (Ingham (Alaiedon Township, Aurelius Township, Bunker Hill Township, Delhi Charter Township, Ingham Township, southwest Lansing, Leroy Township, Leslie, Leslie Township, Locke Township, Mason, Onondaga Township, Stockbridge Township, Vevay Township, Wheatfield Township, White Oak Township, Williamston, Williamston Township--far southeast tip))
Party	Candidate	Votes	%
Democratic	Dianne Byrum	19,138	58.94
Republican	Donald Vickers	13,331	41.06
Total votes		32,469	100.0
Democratic gain from Republican			

68th District (Ingham (Lansing—excluding southwest portion, Lansing Township))
Party	Candidate	Votes	%
Democratic	Michael Murphy (incumbent)	18,824	66.89
Republican	Tim Havis	8,167	29.02
Reform	DelRae Finnerty	575	2.04
Total votes		27,566	100.0
Democratic hold			

69th District (Ingham (east East Lansing, Williamston Township--most))
Party	Candidate	Votes	%
Democratic	Gretchen Whitmer (incumbent)	18,002	62.54
Republican	Larry Ward	10,783	37.46
Total votes		28,785	100.0
Democratic hold			

70th District (Ionia (Belding, Berlin Township--small part, Ionia, Ionia Township--part, Keene Township, Orleans Township, Otisco Township), Montcalm)
Party	Candidate	Votes	%
Republican	Judy Emmons	14,610	65.82
Democratic	Henry Sanchez	7,588	34.18
Total votes		22,198	100.0
Republican gain from Democratic			

71st District (Eaton (excluding Brookfield Township, Eaton Rapids, Hamlin Township))
Party	Candidate	Votes	%
Republican	Susan Tabor	19,326	55.68
Democratic	Sherry Freeman	15,383	44.32
Total votes		34,709	100.0
Republican hold			

72nd District (Kent (Caledonia Township, Cascade Township, Gaines Township, Kentwood))
Party	Candidate	Votes	%
Republican	Glenn Steil	24,166	72.76
Democratic	Christopher Vogt	8,391	25.26
Libertarian	David Good	655	1.97
Total votes		33,212	100.0
Republican hold			

73rd District (Kent (Algoma Township, Cannon Township, Cedar Springs, Courtland Township, Nelson Township, Oakfield Township, Plainfield Township, Rockford, Solon Township, Sparta Township, Spencer Township, Tyrone Township))
Party	Candidate	Votes	%
Republican	Doug Hart	24,370	69.94
Democratic	Frederick Clowney	9,845	28.26
Libertarian	Thomas Horan	628	1.8
Total votes		34,843	100.0
Republican hold			

74th District (Kent (Alpine Township, Grandville), Ottawa (Coopersville, Crockery Township, Georgetown Township, Polkton Township, Tallmadge Township, Wright Township))
Party	Candidate	Votes	%
Republican	William Van Regenmorter	28,234	78.14
Democratic	Beverly Barringer	7,492	20.73
Libertarian	Bill Gelineau	407	1.13
Total votes		36,133	100.0
Republican hold			

75th District (Kent (east Grand Rapids))
Party	Candidate	Votes	%
Republican	Jerry Kooiman	15,340	53.85
Democratic	Peter Vander Meulen	12,737	44.71
Libertarian	Erwin Haas	408	1.43
Total votes		28,485	100.0
Republican hold			

76th District (Kent (west Grand Rapids))
Party	Candidate	Votes	%
Democratic	Michael Sak	11,770	60.7
Republican	Mark Kubik	7,216	37.21
Libertarian	Paul Mastin	405	2.09
Total votes		19,391	100.0
Democratic hold			

77th District (Kent (Byron Township, Wyoming))
Party	Candidate	Votes	%
Republican	Joanne Voorhees	18,103	70.66
Democratic	Virginia Smith	7,070	27.6
Libertarian	Wayne Dial	447	1.74
Total votes		25,620	100.0
Republican hold			

78th District (Berrien (Baroda Township, Berrien Township, Bertland Township, Buchanan, Buchanan Township, Chikaming Township, Galien Township, New Buffalo, New Buffalo Township, Niles, Niles Township, Oronoko Township, Pipestone Township, Three Oaks Township, Weesaw Township), Cass (Dowagiac, Howard Township, LaGrange--small portion, Niles, Silver Creek Township, Wayne Township))
Party	Candidate	Votes	%
Republican	Neal Nitz	11,814	58.17
Democratic	Michael Gordon	8,497	41.83
Total votes		20,311	100.0
Republican hold			

79th District (Berrien (Bainbridge Township, Benton Charter Township, Benton Harbor, Bridgeman, Coloma, Coloma Township, Hager Township, Lake Charter Township, Lincoln Township, Royalton Township, Sodus Township, St. Joseph Charter Township, St. Joseph, Watervliet, Waterlivet Township))
Party	Candidate	Votes	%
Republican	Charles LaSata	16,275	69.26
Democratic	Ruthie Haralson	7,224	30.74
Total votes		23,499	100.0
Republican hold			

80th District (Allegan (Otsego, Otsego Township, Watson Township), Van Buren)
Party	Candidate	Votes	%
Republican	Mary Ann Middaugh	15,740	68.11
Democratic	Whitney Wolcott	7,368	31.89
Total votes		23,108	100.0
Republican hold			

81st District (St. Clair (Algonac, Berlin Township, Brockway Township, Casco Township, China Township, Clay Township, Clyde Township, Cottrellville Township, East China Township, Emmet Township, Grant Township, Greenwood Township, Kenockee Township, Lynn Township, Marine City, Marysville, north Memphis, Mussey Township, Port Huron Township, Richmond--small portion, Riley Township, St. Clair, St. Clair Township, Yale))
Party	Candidate	Votes	%
Republican	Lauren Hager	20,038	66.46
Democratic	Colin Rumsey	10,114	33.54
Total votes		30,152	100.0
Republican hold			

82nd District (Lapeer)
Party	Candidate	Votes	%
Republican	John Stahl	16,464	56.64
Democratic	Eric Knuth	10,288	35.39
Reform	Laura Erpelding	1,159	3.99
Total votes		27,911	100.0
Republican hold			

83rd District (Sanilac, St. Clair (Burtchville Township, Fort Gratiot Township, Port Huron))
Party	Candidate	Votes	%
Republican	Stephen Ehardt	17,268	64.46
Democratic	Edward Schultz	9,520	35.54
Total votes		26,788	100.0
Republican hold			

=== Districts 84-110 ===
84th District (Huron, Tuscola)
Party	Candidate	Votes	%
Republican	Tom Meyer (incumbent)	16,905	54.51
Democratic	Tom Kern	13,784	44.44
Green	A. Wright	325	1.05
Total votes		31,014	100.0
Republican hold			

85th District (Clinton (Bath Township, Dewitt Township--part, Ovid Township, Victor Township, Shiawassee))
Party	Candidate	Votes	%
Republican	Larry Julian (incumbent)	18,239	60.59
Democratic	Russell Kregger	11,313	37.58
Reform	James Roddy	549	1.82
Total votes		30,101	100.0
Republican hold			

86th District (Kent (Ada Township, Bowne Township, East Grand Rapids, north-central Grand Rapids, Grand Rapids Township, Grattan Township, Lowell, Lowell Township, Vergennes Township, Walker))
Party	Candidate	Votes	%
Republican	James Koetje	24,865	68.94
Democratic	James McDonald, Jr.	10,456	28.99
Libertarian	Patricia Steinport	747	2.07
Total votes		36,068	100.0
Republican hold			

87th District (Barry, Ionia (Berlin Township--most, Boston Township, Campbell Township, Danby Township, Ionia--small part, Ionia Township--most, Lyons Township, North Plains Township, Odessa Township, Orange Township, Portland, Portland Township, Ronald Township, Sebewa Township))
Party	Candidate	Votes	%
Republican	Gary Newell	19,676	64.1
Democratic	Rebecca Lukasiewicz	11,020	35.9
Total votes		30,696	100.0
Republican hold			

88th District (Allegan (excluding Watson Township, Otsego, Otsego Township))
Party	Candidate	Votes	%
Republican	Fulton Sheen	20,727	68.58
Democratic	Marty Jo Fleser	9,497	31.42
Total votes		30,224	100.0
Republican hold			

89th District (Ottawa (Allendale Township, Ferrysburg, Grand Haven, Grand Haven Township, Olive Township, Park Township, Port Sheldon Township, Robinson Township, Spring Lake Township))
Party	Candidate	Votes	%
Republican	Barb Vander Veen	22,238	72.57
Democratic	Rebecca Arenas	8,405	27.43
Total votes		30,643	100.0
Republican hold			

90th District (Ottawa (Blendon, Holland--part within county, Holland Township, Hudsonville, Jamestown Township, Zeeland, Zeeland Township))
Party	Candidate	Votes	%
Republican	Bill Huizenga	22,940	81.61
Democratic	Ken Breese	5,168	18.39
Total votes		28,108	100.0
Republican hold			

91st District (Muskegon (Blue Lake Township, Casnovia Township, Cedar Creek Township, Dalton Township, Egelston Township, Fruitport Township, Holton Township, Montague, Montague Township, Moorland Township, Ravenna Township, Roosevelt Park, Sullivan Township, White River Township, Whitehall, Whitehall Township), Ottawa (Chester Township))
Party	Candidate	Votes	%
Republican	David Farhat	14,892	50.75
Democratic	Nancy Frye	14,450	49.25
Total votes		29,342	100.0
Republican hold			

92nd District (Muskegon (Fruitland Township, Laketon Township, Muskegon Heights, Muskegon, Muskegon Township, North Muskegon))
Party	Candidate	Votes	%
Democratic	Julie Dennis	15,339	67.25
Republican	Gregory Boughton	7,471	32.75
Total votes		22,810	100.0
Democratic hold			

93rd District (Clinton (excluding Ovid Township, Victor Township, Bath Township, Dewitt Township--part), Gratiot)
Party	Candidate	Votes	%
Republican	Scott Hummel	20,278	66.92
Democratic	Brian Lott	10,026	33.08
Total votes		30,304	100.0
Republican hold			

94th District (Saginaw (Albee Township, Birch Run Township, Blumfield Township, Chesaning Township, Frankenmuth, Frankenmuth Township, James Township, Maple Grove Township, Saginaw Township, St. Charles Township, Swan Creek Township, Taymouth Township, Thomas Township)
Party	Candidate	Votes	%
Republican	Jim Howell (incumbent)	20,757	57.5
Democratic	Tim Braun	15,020	41.61
Libertarian	Scott Carter	320	0.89
Total votes		36,097	100.0
Republican hold			

95th District (Saginaw (Bridgeport Township, Buena Vista Township, Saginaw, Spaulding Township))
Party	Candidate	Votes	%
Democratic	Carl M. Williams (incumbent)	16,897	73.66
Republican	Michael Howe	6,042	26.34
Total votes		22,939	100.0
Democratic hold			

96th District (Bay (Auburn, Bangor Township, Bay City, Beaver Township, Essexville, Frankenlust Township, Hampton Township, Merritt Township, Midland—portion within county, Monitor Township, Portsmouth Township, Williams Township))
Party	Candidate	Votes	%
Democratic	Joseph Rivet	21,126	63.71
Republican	Vaughn Begick	12,032	36.29
Total votes		33,158	100.0
Democratic hold			

97th District (Arenac, Bay (Fraser Township, Garfield Township, Gibson Township, Kawkawlin Township, Mount Forest Township, Pinconning, Pinconning Township), Clare, Gladwin)
Party	Candidate	Votes	%
Democratic	Jennifer Elkins	14,480	50.6
Republican	David Coker	14,137	49.4
Total votes		28,617	100.0
Democratic hold			

98th District (Midland (Homer Township, Ingersoll Township, Larkin Township—small part, Lincoln Township—small part, Midland—almost all, Midland Township, Mount Haley Township), Saginaw (Brady Township, Brant Township, Carrollton Township, Chapin Township, Fremont Township, Jonesfield Township, Kochville Township, Lakefield Township, Marian Township, Richland Township, Tittabawassee Township, Zilwaukee, Zilwaukee Township))
Party	Candidate	Votes	%
Republican	John Moolenaar	19,423	63.61
Democratic	Lenny Lefevre	11,110	36.39
Total votes		30,533	100.0
Republican hold			

99th District (Isabella, Midland (Coleman, Edenville Township, Geneva Township, Greendale Township, Hope Township, Jasper Township, Jerome Township, Larkin Township—almost all, Lee Township, Lincoln Township—almost all, Mills Township, Porter Township, Warren Township)
Party	Candidate	Votes	%
Republican	Sandy Caul	15,261	61.86
Democratic	Justin Eastman	9,410	38.14
Total votes		24,671	100.0
Republican hold			

100th District (Lake, Newaygo, Oceana)
Party	Candidate	Votes	%
Republican	Mike Pumford	16,959	64.64
Democratic	Don Sterling	9,279	35.36
Total votes		26,238	100.0
Republican hold			

101st District (Benzie, Leelanau, Manistee, Mason)
Party	Candidate	Votes	%
Republican	David Palsrok	18,684	54.25
Democratic	Nick Krieger	15,757	45.75
Total votes		34,441	100.0
Republican hold			

102nd District (Mecosta, Osceola, Wexford)
Party	Candidate	Votes	%
Republican	Rick Johnson (incumbent)	17,815	66.92
Democratic	Paul Challender	8,805	33.08
Total votes		26,620	100.0
Republican hold			

103rd District (Iosco, Missaukee, Ogemaw, Roscommon)
Party	Candidate	Votes	%
Democratic	Dale Sheltrown (incumbent)	18,571	57.98
Republican	Ken Carlson	13,457	42.02
Total votes		32,028	100.0
Democratic hold			

104th District (Grand Traverse, Kalkaska)
Party	Candidate	Votes	%
Republican	Howard Walker	21,931	63.63
Democratic	Joel Casler	11,493	33.35
Reform	Tony Hefner	521	1.51
Total votes		33,945	100.0
Republican hold			

105th District (Antrim, Charlevoix, Cheboygan (excluding Koehler Township, Tuscarora Township), Otsego)
Party	Candidate	Votes	%
Republican	Ken Bradstreet	21,609	63.91
Democratic	Mike Webster	12,203	36.09
Total votes		33,812	100.0
Republican hold			

106th District (Alcona, Alpena, Crawford, Montmorency, Oscoda, Presque Isle)
Party	Candidate	Votes	%
Democratic	Matt Gillard	16,450	50.72
Republican	David Wyman	15,984	49.28
Total votes		32,434	100.0
Democratic hold			

107th District (Cheboygan (Koehler Township, Tuscarora Township), Chippewa, Emmet, Mackinac)
Party	Candidate	Votes	%
Republican	Scott Shackleton (incumbent)	19,514	68.53
Democratic	Gary McDowell	8,963	31.47
Total votes		28,477	100.0
Republican hold			

Results by county Casperson: 50–60%; Stupak: 50–60%

108th District (Delta, Dickinson, Menominee)
Party	Candidate	Votes	%
Republican	Tom Casperson	15,009	51.77
Democratic	Laurie Stupak	13,982	48.23
Total votes		28,991	100.0
Republican gain from Democratic			

109th District (Alger, Luce, Marquette (excluding Powell Township, West Branch Township), Schoolcraft)
Party	Candidate	Votes	%
Democratic	Stephen Adamini (incumbent)	20,396	69.49
Republican	Jim Hafeman	8,954	30.51
Total votes		29,350	100.0
Democratic hold			

110th District (Baraga, Gogebic, Houghton, Iron, Keweenaw, Marquette (Powell Township), Ontonagon)
Party	Candidate	Votes	%
Democratic	Rich Brown (incumbent)	18,544	70.36
Republican	Barry Fay	7,812	29.64
Total votes		26,356	100.0
Democratic hold			

== See also ==
- Michigan Senate election, 2002
