= Durhal =

Durhal is a surname. Notable people with the surname include:

- Fred Durhal Jr. (1951–2025), American politician
- Fred Durhal III (born 1984), American politician
