= Michigan's 6th House of Representatives district =

American legislative district

Michigan's 6th State House of Representatives district
Representative
Natalie Price; D–Berkley
- Demographics: 80.4% White; 6.6% Black; 4.5% Hispanic; 3% Asian; 0.1% Native American; 0.5% Other; 4.9% Multiracial
- Population (2024): 92,111

Michigan's 6th House of Representatives district is a legislative district within the Michigan House of Representatives located in Oakland County. The district was created in 1965, when the Michigan Supreme Court ordered the reapportionment of state legislative districts from a county-based system to a proportional one following the Supreme Court case Reynolds v. Sims. It is currently represented by Democrat Natalie Price of Berkley.

== List of representatives ==
Representative	Party	Years	Residence	Notes
Robert D. Mahoney	Democratic	1965–1972	Detroit	Reapportioned from the former Wayne County, 3rd district.
Morris W. Hood Jr.	Democratic	1973–1992	Detroit	Redistricted from the 21st district; redistricted to the 11th district.
David S. Points	Democratic	1993–1994	Highland Park	
Martha G. Scott	Democratic	1995–2000	Highland Park; Detroit (from around 1996 to 1998)	Term limited.
Bill McConico	Democratic	2001–2002	Detroit	Redistricted to the 5th district.
Marsha G. Cheeks	Democratic	2003–2008	Detroit	Term limited.
Frederick Durhal Jr.	Democratic	2009–2012	Detroit	Previously served in the 9th district; redistricted to the 5th district.
Rashida Tlaib	Democratic	2013–2014	Detroit	Redistricted from the 12th district; term limited.
Stephanie Chang	Democratic	2015–2018	Detroit	
Tyrone Carter	Democratic	2019–2022	Detroit	Redistricted to the 1st district.
Regina Weiss	Democratic	2023–2024	Oak Park	Redistricted from the 27th district; redistricted to the 5th district.
Natalie Price	Democratic	2025–present	Berkley	Redistricted from the 5th district.
Melanie Macey	Democratic	(Note: Member-elect.)	Royal Oak	

== Historical district boundaries ==
Map	Description	Apportionment Plan	Notes
	Wayne County (part): Detroit (part)	1964 Apportionment Plan (Note: Referred to as the Austin-Kleiner plan.)	
	Wayne County (part): Detroit (part)	1972 Apportionment Plan (Note: Referred to as the Hatcher-Kleiner plan.)	
	Wayne County (part): Detroit (part)	1982 Apportionment Plan	
	Wayne County (part): Detroit (part; portions of the Upper East Side); Hamtramck; Highland Park	1992 Apportionment Plan	
	Wayne County (part): Detroit (part; portions of Downtown and the East Side)	2001 Apportionment Plan	
	Wayne County (part): Detroit (part; portions of the Lower East Side, Downtown, Southwest, and Boynton); Ecorse; River Rouge	2011 Apportionment Plan	
	Oakland County (part): Berkley (part); Huntington Woods; Oak Park (part); Royal Oak (part); Royal Oak Township (part); Wayne County (part): Detroit (part)	2021 Apportionment Plan (Note: Referred to as the Hickory plan.)	
	Oakland County (part): Berkley; Birmingham (part); Bloomfield Township (part); Huntington Woods; Royal Oak (part); Southfield (part); Southfield Township (part)	Remedial 2021 Apportionment Plan Approved in 2024 (Note: Referred to as the Motown Sound FC E1 plan.)	

== Recent elections ==
=== 2020s ===
2026 Michigan House of Representatives election
Party	Candidate	Votes	%
Democratic	Melanie Macey	37,769	69.49
Republican	Mike Steger	16,581	30.51
Total votes		54,530	100
Democratic hold			

2024 Michigan House of Representatives election
Party	Candidate	Votes	%
Democratic	Natalie Price	39,839	66.2
Republican	Brent M. Lamkin	20,342	33.8
Total votes		60,181	100
Democratic hold			

2022 Michigan House of Representatives election
Party	Candidate	Votes	%
Democratic	Regina Weiss	33,898	83.9
Republican	Charles T. Villerot	6,507	16.1
Total votes		40,405	100
Democratic hold			

2020 Michigan House of Representatives election
Party	Candidate	Votes	%
Democratic	Tyrone Carter (incumbent)	28,161	100
Total votes		28,161	100
Democratic hold			

=== 2010s ===
2018 Michigan House of Representatives election
Party	Candidate	Votes	%
Democratic	Tyrone Carter	21,005	91.08
Republican	Linda Sawyer	2,056	8.92
Total votes		23,061	100
Democratic hold			

2016 Michigan House of Representatives election
Party	Candidate	Votes	%
Democratic	Stephanie Chang (incumbent)	26,301	92.52
Republican	Attie Pollard	2,125	7.48
Total votes		28,426	100
Democratic hold			

2014 Michigan House of Representatives election
Party	Candidate	Votes	%
Democratic	Stephanie Chang	17,926	93.97
Republican	Tairia Bridges	1,149	6.02
Democratic Write-In	Donnie Malone	1	0.01
Total votes		19,076	100
Democratic hold			

2012 Michigan House of Representatives election
Party	Candidate	Votes	%
Democratic	Rashida Tlaib	28,794	92.19
Republican	Darrin Daigle	1,588	5.08
Green	Elena M. Herrada	853	2.73
Total votes		31,235	100
Democratic hold			

2010 Michigan House of Representatives election
Party	Candidate	Votes	%
Democratic	Fred Durhal, Jr. (incumbent)	14,328	96.21
Republican	Robert O. Midgett	519	3.49
Write-In	Cynthia A. Johnson	45	0.3
Total votes		14,892	100
Democratic hold			

=== 2000s ===
2008 Michigan House of Representatives election
Party	Candidate	Votes	%
Democratic	Fred Durhal, Jr.	28,156	100.00
Total votes		28,156	100
Democratic hold			

2006 Michigan House of Representatives election
Party	Candidate	Votes	%
Democratic	Marsha G. Cheeks (incumbent)	18,389	95.27
Republican	Charity Renee Jones	913	4.73
Total votes		19,302	100
Democratic hold			

2004 Michigan House of Representatives election
Party	Candidate	Votes	%
Democratic	Marsha G. Cheeks (incumbent)	26,880	91.98
Republican	Dorothy Patterson	1,511	5.17
Green	Michael Madias	832	2.85
Total votes		29,223	100
Democratic hold			

2002 Michigan House of Representatives election
Party	Candidate	Votes	%
Democratic	Marsha G. Cheeks	17,428	93.71
Republican	Dorothy Patterson	775	4.17
Green	Margaret Guttshall	394	2.12
Total votes		18,597	100
Democratic hold			

2000 Michigan House of Representatives election
Party	Candidate	Votes	%
Democratic	Bill McConico	18,055	93.09
Republican	Anthony J. Elam, Sr	1,337	6.89
Write-In	Bernadette Traylor	3	0.02
Total votes		19,395	100
Democratic hold			

=== 1990s ===
1998 Michigan House of Representatives election
Party	Candidate	Votes	%
Democratic	Martha G. Scott (incumbent)	14,269	91.32
Republican	Raymond F. Prus	1,356	8.68
Total votes		15,625	100
Democratic hold			
