= Dianne Byrum =

American politician from Michigan

Dianne Yvonne Byrum

Trustee of the Michigan State University
- In office January 1, 2009 – January 1, 2025
- Preceded by: G. Scott Romney
- Succeeded by: Rebecca Bahar-Cook

Minority Leader of the Michigan House of Representatives
- In office January 1, 2003 – December 31, 2006
- Preceded by: Buzz Thomas
- Succeeded by: Andy Dillon

Member of the Michigan House of Representatives from the 67th district
- In office January 1, 2003 – December 31, 2006
- Preceded by: Paul DeWeese
- Succeeded by: Barb Byrum

Member of the Michigan Senate from the 25th district
- In office January 11, 1995 – December 31, 2002
- Preceded by: Joe Conroy
- Succeeded by: Judson Gilbert II

Member of the Michigan House of Representatives from the 68th district
- In office January 13, 1993 – December 31, 1994
- Preceded by: Shirley Johnson
- Succeeded by: Lingg Brewer

Member of the Michigan House of Representatives from the 58th district
- In office January 9, 1991 – December 31, 1992
- Preceded by: Debbie Stabenow
- Succeeded by: Michael E. Nye

Personal details
- Born: March 18, 1954 (age 72) Jackson, Michigan
- Party: Democratic
- Spouse: James Byrum
- Children: 2
- Relatives: Barbara Byrum (daughter)
- Education: Michigan State University
- Occupation: Politician, University trustee
- Website: Official website

Dianne Byrum (born March 18, 1954) is a former trustee of Michigan State University and a partner with Byrum & Fisk Advocacy Communications, an East Lansing-based public relations firm.

== Early life ==
On March 18, 1954, Byrum was born in Jackson, Michigan.

== Education ==
In 1973, Byrum earned an Associates of Art degree from Lansing Community College. The following year, she earned a Bachelor of Science degree from the Michigan State University College of Agriculture.

== Career ==
In 1983, Byrum became the owner and operator of Byrum Ace Hardware.

In 1980, Byrum's political career started when she served as a Commissioner for Ingham County Board of Commissioner until 1990. On November 6, 1990, Byrum won the election and became a Democratic member of Michigan House of Representatives for District 58. On January 9, 1991, Byrum was sworn into the office. On November 3, 1992, Byrum won the election and became a Democratic member of Michigan House of Representatives for District 68. On January 13, 1993, Byrum sworn into office. On November 8, 1994, Byrum won the election and became a member of Michigan Senate for District 25. On January 11, 1995, Byrum sworn into the office. In November 1996, as an incumbent state senator, Byrum won the election and continued serving District 25. In November 1998 as an incumbent, Byrum won the election and continued serving District 25. In November 2000, Byrum lost a US House election to Republican Mike Rogers. On November 5, 2002, Byrum won the election and became a Democratic member of Michigan House of Representatives for District 67. On November 2, 2004, as an incumbent, Byrum won the election and continued serving District 67. In November 2006, Byrum did not seek a seat for District 67.

In 2008, Byrum was first elected to the Michigan State University board of trustees. In 2016, Byrum was re-elected as trustee. She was on the Board during the USA Gymnastics sex abuse scandal and was the second trustee calling for MSU President Lou Anna Simon to resign. In 2019, Byrum was elected as the chair person of Michigan State University Board of Trustee. Byrum's term ends in 2025.

== Electoral history ==
Michigan State University Board of Trustees election 2008
Party	Candidate	Votes	%	±%
Democratic	Dianne Byrum	2,186,120	26	4
Democratic	Diann Woodard	2,104,266	25	3
Republican	G. Scott Romney	1,793,777	22	−3
Republican	Lisa Bouchard	1,725,884	21	−4

Michigan House of Representatives election 2004 (District 67)
Party	Candidate	Votes	%	±%
Democratic	Dianne Byrum (Incumbent)	25,709	54.8	10.6
Republican	Beth Chandler	21,205	44.2	

Michigan House of Representatives election 2002 (District 67)
Party	Candidate	Votes	%	±%
Democratic	Dianne Byrum	19,138	58.9	17.8
Republican	Donald Vickers	13,331	41.1	

U.S. House of Representatives election 2000 (District 8)
Party	Candidate	Votes	%	±%
Democratic	Dianne Byrum	145,079	48.7	
Republican	Mike Rogers	145,190	48.8	.1

Michigan Senate election 1998 (District 25)
Party	Candidate	Votes	%	±%
Democratic	Dianne Byrum (Incumbent)	55,200	68.1	36.2
Republican	Pat Gallagher	25,816	31.9	

== Personal life ==
Byrum's husband is Jim Byrum. They have two children, Barbara Byrum and James Byrum. Byrum and her family live in Onondaga, Michigan.

== See also ==
- 2002 Michigan House of Representatives election
- 2004 Michigan House of Representatives election
