= Tom Cochran (politician) =

American politician

Member of the Michigan House of Representatives from the 67th district
- In office January 1, 2013 – January 1, 2019
- Preceded by: Barb Byrum
- Succeeded by: Kara Hope

Personal details
- Born: Lansing, Michigan
- Party: Democratic
- Spouse: Kathy
- Education: Siena Heights University (B.S.); Lansing Community College (A.A.)
- Occupation: Firefighter, politician
- Website: State Rep. Tom Cochran

Tom Cochran is an American politician, government official, and retired firefighter. A Democrat, Cochran served in the Michigan House of Representatives from 2013 to 2019.

Cochran formerly served as chief of the Lansing Fire Department, retiring in January 2012. He is also a former member of the Mason School Board. In 2022, he was appointed by Governor Gretchen Whitmer to serve on the State Officers Compensation Commission.

== Education ==
Cochran received a Bachelor of Science (B.S.) degree in management from Siena Heights University and an associate's degree in fire science from Lansing Community College.

== Political career ==
A member of the Democratic Party, Cochran was elected in 2012 to represent the 67th district of the Michigan House of Representatives. He was term-limited in the 2018 election.

Preceded by Barbara Byrum	Michigan State Representative, 67th District; 2013–2019	Succeeded by Kara Hope
