= David S. Points =

American politician (born 1954)

Member of the Michigan House of Representatives from the 6th district
- In office January 13, 1993 – December 31, 1994
- Preceded by: Morris Hood Jr.
- Succeeded by: Martha G. Scott

Personal details
- Born: May 16, 1954 (age 72) Detroit, Michigan
- Party: Democratic
- Education: Saginaw Valley State University; Ohio Northern University

David S. Points (born May 16, 1954) is a former member of the Michigan House of Representatives.

== Early life and education ==
Points was born on May 16, 1954, in Detroit, Michigan. Points earned a B.A. in English from Saginaw Valley State University. He then earned a J.D. from Ohio Northern University.

== Career ==
Points served as in the United States Navy Reserve, earning the rank of lieutenant commander. Points worked as a teacher in Detroit Public Schools. Points formerly served as a court administrator and magistrate for the 30th District Court in Highland Park, Michigan. On November 3, 1992, Points was elected to the Michigan House of Representatives where he represented the 6th district from January 13, 1993, to December 31, 1994. On August 2, 1994, Points lost the Democratic primary that would have allowed him to run for re-election in the general election. He lost to Martha G. Scott, who would go on to win the general election and succeed him in the state house. On August 5, 2008, Points would again be defeated in a primary, this time for the 7th state house district.

== Electoral history ==
Michigan House of Representatives 6th District Democratic Primary Election, 1992
Party	Candidate	Votes	%
Democratic	David S. Points	2,365	29.82
Democratic	Chester Wozniak	2,327	29.34
Democratic	John Luster	1,299	16.38
Democratic	John Patterson	901	11.36
Democratic	Robert Zwolak	331	4.17
Democratic	Darrell Little	312	3.93
Democratic	Henry Bolton	224	2.83
Democratic	Ron Womble	171	2.17
Total votes		7,930	100.00

Michigan House of Representatives 6th District General Election, 1992
Party	Candidate	Votes	%
Democratic	David S. Points	21,074	89.94
Republican	Raymond Prus	2,356	10.10
Write-ins		1	0.00
Total votes		23,431	100
Democratic hold			

Michigan House of Representatives 6th District Democratic Primary Election, 1994
Party	Candidate	Votes	%
Democratic	Martha G. Scott	4,018	43.58
Democratic	David S. Point	3,844	41.70
Democratic	Thomas Jankowski	706	7.66
Democratic	Sigmunt Szczepkowski Jr.	651	7.06
Total votes		9,219	100.00

Michigan House of Representatives 7th District Democratic Primary Election, 2008
Party	Candidate	Votes	%
Democratic	Jimmy Womack	2,049	23.92
Democratic	Al Williams	1,729	20.18
Democratic	Carol Weaver	1,121	13.09
Democratic	Brenda Goss Andrews	953	11.12
Democratic	Lee Gaddies	369	4.31
Democratic	Margaret L. Betts	366	4.27
Democratic	Mary Sheffield	287	3.35
Democratic	Henry Edward Stallings	285	3.33
Democratic	David S. Points	231	2.70
Democratic	Earl Smith	227	2.65
Democratic	Terra DeFoe	193	2.25
Democratic	Bernard Thompson	169	1.97
Democratic	Dennis Vaughn	161	1.88
Democratic	Steven E. Butler	145	1.69
Democratic	Michelle R. Gibson	108	1.26
Democratic	Sean C. Thomas	91	1.06
Democratic	Marilyn Drake Thompson	83	0.97
Total votes		8,567	100.00
