= Natalie Price (politician) =

American politician

Member of the Michigan House of Representatives
- Incumbent
- Assumed office January 1, 2023
- Preceded by: Cynthia A. Johnson
- Succeeded by: Melanie Macey (elect)
- Constituency: 5th district (2023–2024); 6th district (2025–present)

Personal details
- Party: Democratic
- Children: 2
- Education: Vassar College; University of Exeter
- Website: House website Campaign website

Natalie Price is an American politician serving as a member of the Michigan House of Representatives since 2023, currently representing the 6th district. A member of the Democratic Party, Price previously served as a member of the Berkley City Council.

== Early life and education ==
Price cites her mother and grandmother as influential in her early years. Her mother went back to school after her divorce to become a social worker. Price's grandmother raised her own siblings after her mother died in childbirth, and later looked after Price and her brother.

Price received a Bachelor of Arts in English and classics (ancient societies) from Vassar College. She later went on to receive a Master of Arts in English Studies from the University of Exeter.

== Early career ==
Price worked as a teacher. She was elected to the Berkley City Council in 2019.

== State legislature ==
Price defeated four opponents to win the August 2022 House Democratic primary in District 5. She won the general election for that seat with over 75% of the vote. Following court-mandated redistricting of the Detroit area, Price ran in the 6th district for the 2024 election, winning reelection.

== Personal life ==
Price is married and has two children.

== Electoral history ==
2022 Michigan's 5th House of Representatives district election
Party	Candidate	Votes	%
Democratic	Natalie Price	30,699	78.35%
Republican	Paul Taros	8,481	21.65%
Total votes		39,180	100.0

2024 Michigan's 6th House of Representatives district election
Party	Candidate	Votes	%
Democratic	Natalie Price (incumbent)	39,839	66.20%
Republican	Brent M. Lamkin	20,342	33.80%
Total votes		60,181	100.0
