= Bert Johnson (Michigan politician) =

American politician and criminal

Bertram "Bert" Johnson

Member of the Michigan Senate from the 2nd district
- In office January 1, 2011 – March 2, 2018
- Preceded by: Martha G. Scott
- Succeeded by: Adam Hollier

Member of the Michigan House of Representatives from the 5th district
- In office January 1, 2007 – January 1, 2011
- Preceded by: William McConico
- Succeeded by: John Olumba

Personal details
- Born: October 20, 1973 (age 52) Detroit, Michigan, U.S.
- Party: Democratic
- Children: India, Bertram, Nicholas and David
- Education: University of Detroit Mercy
- Website: Official Website

Bertram "Bert" Johnson (born October 20, 1973) is a Democratic former member of the Michigan Senate.

Johnson previously represented the 2nd district, which comprises northeast Detroit, Highland Park, Hamtramck, Harper Woods and all five Grosse Pointe Communities. From 2007 to 2010, Johnson served as a member of the Michigan House of Representatives.

== Education ==
Johnson attended the University of Detroit Jesuit High School and Academy. He studied Criminology and Security Administration at the University of Detroit Mercy.

== Legal issues ==
=== Criminal ===
In 1993, as a teenager, Johnson plead guilty to charged of a break in and armed robbery at a country club. He was sentenced to eight months in prison and three years on probation.

On March 27, 2017, Johnson's home and Senate office were searched in a raid jointly conducted by the Federal Bureau of Investigation (FBI) and the Michigan State Police. FBI agents seized a 12-gauge shotgun and a Remington 16-gauge shotgun from Banks's home, but did not say whether they were his.

In April 2017, Johnson was indicted by a grand jury on federal charges of conspiracy and theft, for using federal funds to pay for a ghost employee. Due to his indictment, a recall petition was filed against Johnson by Robert Davis. On April 18, 2017, Johnson was arraigned in front of Magistrate David R. Grand in the United States District Court for the Eastern District of Michigan, pleaded not guilty and was released on a $10,000 personal recognizance bail. In February 2018, Johnson rejected an initial plea deal and requested to go to trial. On March 2, 2018, Johnson pled guilty to theft and resigned from his senate seat.

Federal prosecutors sought a 12-month prison sentence, but U.S. District Judge Matthew Leitman sentenced Johnson to only 90 days in jail. Johnson was also ordered to pay $23,134 in restitution to the state.

=== Civil judgments ===
Johnson was evicted from his campaign office in 2010.

The "Consensus PAC" linked to Johnson and started by a former staffer owes $11,775. The Michigan Secretary of State referred $9,775 of that amount to the state Treasury Department for collection.

== Political career ==
From 2001 to 2006, Johnson worked as chief of staff to then-Representative Bill McConico.

=== 2010 Senate election ===
Succeeding Martha G. Scott, Johnson was elected as a Michigan State Senator for District 2. After the election, Johnson was named the campaign chair of the Senate Democratic Caucus.

=== 2012 U.S. Congress election ===
Johnson ran for the U.S. House in 2012, but lost the Democratic primaries to John Conyers. Johnson would then go on to chair Conyer's 2014 re-election campaign.

== Personal life ==
Johnson is single with four children.

== See also ==
- Michigan House of Representatives
- Michigan Senate
- Michigan Democratic Party
