= Barbara Byrum =

American politician (born 1977)

Clerk of Ingham County
- Incumbent
- Assumed office January 1, 2013
- Preceded by: Mike Bryanton

Member of the Michigan House of Representatives from the 67th district
- In office January 1, 2007 – December 31, 2012
- Preceded by: Dianne Byrum
- Succeeded by: Tom Cochran

Personal details
- Born: Barbara Anne Byrum; November 10, 1977 (age 48) St. Louis, Missouri, U.S.
- Party: Democratic
- Spouse: Brad Delaney
- Children: 2
- Relatives: Dianne Byrum (mother)
- Education: Lansing Community College (attended); Michigan State University (BS, JD)

Barbara Anne Byrum (born November 10, 1977) is an American politician serving as the county clerk of Ingham County, Michigan since 2013. A member of the Democratic Party, Byrum previously represented the 67th District in the Michigan House of Representatives. She succeeded her mother, House Minority Leader Dianne Byrum. She owns Byrum Hardware in Charlotte, Michigan, and lives in Onondaga with her husband Brad Delaney and their two children.

== Early life, education, and early career ==
Byrum grew up in Onondaga, Michigan, a small rural town in southwestern Ingham County. She is the daughter of Jim Byrum, a former Lansing Community College trustee, and Dianne Byrum, a former State Representative. Byrum is a graduate of Leslie High School. She attended Lansing Community College from 1994 to 1997 before attending Michigan State University. Byrum earned a Bachelor of Science degree in agribusiness management in 1999. After working in agribusiness for a few years, she returned to MSU College of Law and graduated with her juris doctor in 2004.

== House of Representatives ==
Byrum served as the Representative for the 67th House District in the Michigan House of Representatives from 2007 to 2012. During her first term, Byrum was Chair of the Intergovernmental, Urban and Regional Affairs Committee and a vice-chair of the House Committee on Agriculture. During the 94th Legislature, she was also on the Commerce, Education and Health Policy committees and was caucus vice-chair. She was Chair of the House Committee on Insurance. During her last term in the Michigan House of Representatives Byrum was the ranking Democrat on the House Committee on Redistricting and Elections.

=== Micro-Distillers ===
Byrum is responsible for introducing the bill that later became Public Act 218 of 2008 which allows small distilleries to market and sell their distilled grain-based spirits onsite. Byrum worked closely with Kris Berglund, a Distinguished Professor of forestry and chemical engineering at Michigan State University.

=== Vaginagate ===
On June 14, 2012, during a contentious debate over a controversial anti-abortion bill, Byrum and her colleague, Representative Lisa Brown, found themselves banned from speaking on the House floor for saying "vasectomy" and "vagina," respectively. Byrum tried to introduce an amendment to the proposed bill that would ban men having vasectomies unless the procedure was needed to save their lives – a key clause of the anti-abortion bill. She was ruled out of order after protesting that she had not been allowed to speak on her proposal. Both Byrum and Brown were censured by House leadership and forbidden to speak on the floor.

Following the incident on the House floor, playwright Eve Ensler staged a special reading of her play, The Vagina Monologues, on the steps of the state Capitol Building.

== Ingham County Clerk's Office ==
Byrum has served as the Clerk of Ingham County since 2013. On November 8, 2016, she was re-elected to the position. On November 3, 2020, she was re-elected to a third term.

=== Duties as Clerk ===
The County Clerk is elected for a four-year term and is responsible for keeping records of births, deaths, assumed names, co-partnerships, and issuing and filing marriage licenses. In addition, the Clerk's office processes gun permits and notary bonds. The Clerk also serves as the Clerk of the Board of Commissioners, the Board of Canvassers, the Gun Board, and is the Clerk of the Circuit Court. The Clerk is also a member of the Plat Board and Election Commission. The Clerk also serves as an officiant for wedding ceremonies.

One of the more prominent responsibilities is the Chief Election Official in the county. As such, the County Clerk administers all election functions required by law. Part of those duties include the supervision of all national, state, and local elections and includes the training of all election workers in the county for those communities with a population of under ten thousand. The Clerk is also responsible for the Administration of the Michigan Campaign Finance Reporting Act for those candidates that file for office at the local level.

=== Marriage Equality ===
On Saturday, March 22, 2014, following a U.S. District Court ruling that Michigan's ban on same sex marriage was unconstitutional, Byrum performed what has been reported as the first same sex marriage in the state of Michigan. At the time of their marriage, the couple, Glenna DeJong, 53, and Marsha Caspar, 51, had been together for 26 years. When asked why she opted to open her office to issue licenses, Byrum said, "My biggest struggle on that day was -- I can open, yeah, my key will open the door, but how will I actually process those marriage licenses? I couldn't sleep with the thought that I might be standing in the way of loving couples joining together in marriage."

=== Presidential Recount ===
Following the 2016 Presidential Election, Green Party candidate Jill Stein requested a recount of the votes cast in Michigan. On December 5, 2016, the Presidential Recount began in Ingham County. Byrum reportedly hired 75 election workers to recount ballots. On December 7, Byrum announced the recount was finished. Ingham County was the first county to complete their recount.

== Potential Bid for U.S. House Of Representatives ==
Reporting from February 2023 named Byrum as one of several potential Democratic candidates who was considering a run for Michigan's 7th Congressional District, which was open with Rep. Elissa Slotkin announcing her run for U.S. Senate. Byrum confirmed that she was interested and exploring a potential Congressional run in March 2023.

On June 1, Bryum put out a video/written statement over Twitter saying she wasn't running for Congress and instead opted to run for re-election instead.
