= Sophie Womack =

American neonatologist

Sophie Jan Thompson Womack (29 August 1954 – 17 February 2008) was an American physician who specialized in neonatology.

Womack was born in San Antonio, Texas, to Clarence and Irene Thompson. She graduated from Howard University and Meharry Medical College. She received a master's degree from the University of Tennessee at Knoxville. She was vice president of medical affairs for Harper University Hospital and Hutzel Women's Hospital and a former division chief of neonatology at Sinai-Grace Hospital. From 2004 to 2006, she served as president of Detroit Medical Center's medical staff. She was the first woman and African-American to hold that position. Womack was also the first Black woman and third female elected president of the Wayne County Medical Society of Michigan.

A clinic in Detroit, the Dr. Sophie Womack Health Center, is named after the late physician.

She was married to the Rev. Jimmy Womack and had two daughters, Brandi and Ashley.

Along with her husband, Womack formed The Coalition Inc. -- Circle of Hope, an organization that raised more than $1 million while promoting childhood health and well-being.
