= Martha G. Scott =

American politician from Michigan

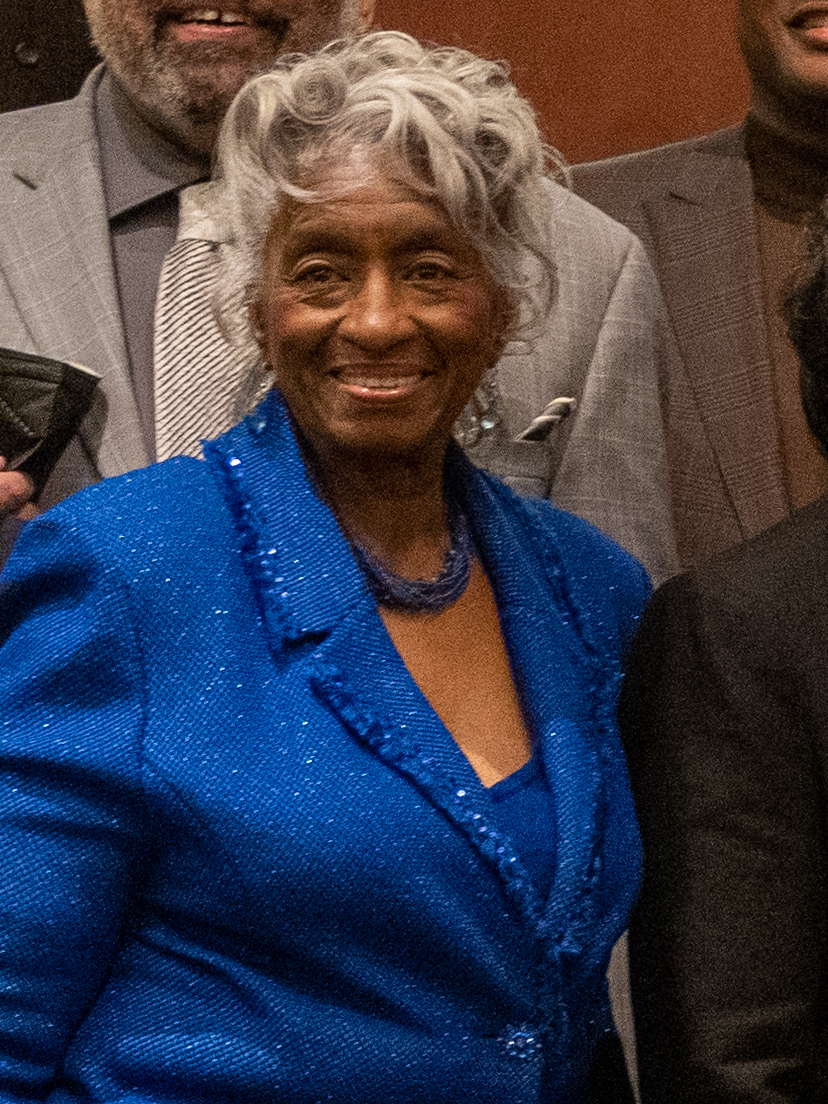
- Scott in 2022

Member of the Wayne County Commission
- Incumbent
- Assumed office 2010
- In office 1977–1979

Member of the Michigan Senate from the 2nd district
- In office April 17, 2001 – December 31, 2010
- Preceded by: Virgil Smith
- Succeeded by: Bert Johnson

Member of the Michigan House of Representatives from the 6th district
- In office January 1, 1995 – December 31, 2000
- Preceded by: David S. Points
- Succeeded by: William McConico

Mayor of Highland Park, Michigan
- In office 1988–1994

President of the Highland Park, Michigan City Council
- In office 1984–1987

Personal details
- Born: November 10, 1935 (age 90) Ware Shoals, South Carolina
- Party: Democratic

Martha G. Scott is an American politician serving as a member of the Wayne County Commission. She previously served as a Democratic member of the Michigan State Senate from 2001 through 2010, a member of the Michigan House of Representatives from 1994 through 2001. Her senate district included the northeast section of Detroit and the cities of Hamtramck, Highland Park, Harper Woods, and the five Grosse Pointes. She was term limited at the 2010 elections, and ran for the office of Wayne County Commissioner. She won election has since been reelected several times to the Wayne County Commission.

== Early life and education ==
Martha G. Scott is a South Carolina native and graduate of Highland Park Public Schools and Highland Park Junior College. In 1990, she received an honorary Doctorate of Law degree from the Urban Bible Institute of Detroit, and an honorary Doctorate of Humanities from the Tennessee School of Religion in 1994. She retired in 1986 from Michigan Bell after 26 years of service.

== Career ==
=== Politics ===
Scott began her career in 1972 as a Democratic Party precinct delegate. In 1977, she was appointed to the Wayne County Board of Commissioners, serving until 1979. In this position, she served as chair of its Human Resource Committee and a member of the Work Education Council, Public Works Committee, and Special Railroad Committee.

In 1979, she served as Vice-Chair of the Wayne County Civil Service Commission. From 1984 to 1987, she was president of the Highland Park, Michigan City Council. In 1988, she was elected the first woman Mayor of Highland Park, making her the first African American woman elected mayor of a Michigan city. She served as mayor until 1994.

In 1994, Scott was elected State Representative of the 6th House District, representing Highland Park, Hamtramck and portions of Detroit. She was re-elected to her second and third House terms in November 1996 and 1998, respectively. During her tenure as State Representative, Scott served on the House Education and Insurance committees and on Task Force committees for Corrections, Education, Higher Education, and Transportation.

She led the charge and fought for many issues that were beneficial to her district, such as restoration of the Davison Freeway (project repair and reconstruction); and for funding to be restored to Highland Park Community College.

As a Michigan Senator, Scott authored Senate Bill 384 of 2005 (Public Act 48), which established the third Saturday of every June as Juneteenth National Freedom Day in Michigan, celebrating the end of slavery in the United States, and which designated November 26 of every year as Sojourner Truth Day, in honor of the Underground Railroad and emancipation leader of the 1800s. She also authored Senate Bill 736 of 2001, which provides for domestic violence training for Friend of the Court employees; Senate Bill 753 of 2003 (Public Act 431), which established the Childhood Lead Poisoning Prevention and Control Commission; and Senate Bill 1198 of 2006 (Public Act 286), which requires all children enrolled in the WIC supplemental food program to be tested for lead poisoning. Most recent, she authored Senate Bill 1125 of 2006 (Public Act 508), which prohibits imposter groups from performing as established musical groups when there are no original members remaining in the group.

In 2000, State Senator Virgil Smith resigned his seat to take a position in the Wayne County Prosecutor's office. Scott ran for and won Smith's former seat in the 2001 special election. She was re-elected in 2002 and 2006. Under the term limits provisions of Michigan's Constitution, Scott is barred from seeking another Senate term in 2010.

In 2008, at age 72, Scott entered the Democratic primary race for United States House of Representatives against incumbent U.S. Rep. Carolyn Cheeks Kilpatrick. However, Scott did not live in the 13th Congressional District and came in third behind the favored challenger, former state representative Mary Waters.

Elected to again serve on the Wayne County Commission in the November 2010 election, and has been reelected several times since. Scott represents the 3rd district.

=== Non-profit work ===
Scott is the Founder and President of the M.G. Scott Foundation. In conjunction with her Senate office, the Foundation hosts an annual health fair for the citizens of the 2nd Senate district, providing them with valuable, free information and testing. The Foundation also has provided scholarships to high school students to participate in the Youth in Government program, has assisted with a national cervical cancer awareness program, and hosts an annual Sojourner Truth Essay Contest for high school students. Scott is an active member of the Russell Street Missionary Baptist Church in Detroit.

== Personal life ==
She has a son, Marion Scott, and a daughter, Deborah Scott. She has two granddaughters, Simone Gilmore and Cristina Tice-Evans (Cedric), both children of Deborah.

She also has five great grandchildren, Alasia (Cristina), Kingston (Simone), Ava (Cristina), Kinsley (Simone), Cedric II (Cristina).

== Electoral history ==
- 2008 election for U.S. House of Representatives - Michigan 13th District (Democratic primary)

Name	Percent
Carolyn Cheeks Kilpatrick (inc.)	39.1%
Mary Waters	36%
Martha G. Scott	24.9%

- 2006 election for Michigan State Senate - Michigan 2nd District

Name	Percent
Martha G. Scott (D) (inc.)	73.4%
Michael Hoehn (R)	26.6%

- 2006 election for Michigan State Senate - Michigan 2nd District (Democratic primary)

Name	Percent
Martha G. Scott (inc.)	56.8%
Bill McConico	33.3%
Sigmunt John Sczepkowski, Jr.	7.1%

- 2002 election for Michigan State Senate - Michigan 2nd District

Name	Percent
Martha G. Scott (inc.)	68.0%
Jeffrey Schroeder	32.0%

- 2002 election for Michigan State Senate - Michigan 2nd District (Democratic primary)

Name	Percent
Martha G. Scott (inc.)	47.1%
Lamar Lemmons, III	28.8%
Michael J. O'Brien	13.1%
Mike Phillips	6.8%

Preceded by Virgil Smith	State Senator from Michigan's 2nd District; 2001 – Present	Succeeded by Incumbent
Preceded by David S. Points	State Representative from Michigan's 6th District; 1994 – 2001	Succeeded by Bill McConico
