= Michigan's 5th House of Representatives district =

American legislative district

Michigan's 5th State House of Representatives district
Representative
Regina Weiss; D–Oak Park
- Demographics: 13.6% White; 78.7% Black; 1.4% Hispanic; 1.5% Asian; 0.2% Native American; 0.1% Hawaiian/Pacific Islander; 1.4% Other; 3.1% Multiracial
- Population (2024): 92,532

Michigan's 5th House of Representatives district is a legislative district within the Michigan House of Representatives located in the counties of Oakland and Wayne. The district was created in 1965, when the Michigan Supreme Court ordered the reapportionment of state legislative districts from a county-based system to a proportional one following the Supreme Court case Reynolds v. Sims. It is currently represented by Democrat Regina Weiss of Oak Park.

== List of representatives ==
Representative	Party	Years	Residence	Notes
E. D. O'Brien	Democratic	1965–1972	Detroit	Reapportioned from the former Wayne County, 3rd district.
George Montgomery Sr.	Democratic	1973–1980	Detroit	Redistricted from the 20th district.
Teola Pearl Hunter	Democratic	1981–1992	Detroit	Resigned January 1992 to work in the Wayne County Health and Community Services Department.
Triette Lipsey Reeves	Democratic	1992 (Note: Elected in a 1992 special election to replace Rep. Teola Pearl Hunter, who resigned.)	Detroit	
Ted Wallace	Democratic	1993–1998	Detroit	Redistricted from the 10th district; term limited.
Kenneth R. Daniels	Democratic	1999–2002	Detroit	Redistricted to the 2nd district.
Bill McConico	Democratic	2003–2006	Detroit	Redistricted from the 6th district; term limited.
Bert Johnson	Democratic	2007–2010	Detroit	
John Olumba	Democratic	2011–2012	Detroit	Redistricted to the 3rd district.
Frederick Durhal Jr.	Democratic	2013–2014	Detroit	Redistricted from the 6th district; term limited.
Fred Durhal III	Democratic	2015–2018	Detroit	
Cynthia A. Johnson	Democratic	2019–2022	Detroit	
Natalie Price	Democratic	2023–2024	Berkley	Redistricted to the 6th district.
Regina Weiss	Democratic	2025–present	Oak Park	Redistricted from the 6th district.
Candace Calloway	Democratic	(Note: Member-elect.)	Detroit	

== Historical district boundaries ==
Map	Description	Apportionment Plan	Notes
	Wayne County (part): Detroit (part)	1964 Apportionment Plan (Note: Referred to as the Austin-Kleiner plan.)	
	Wayne County (part): Detroit (part)	1972 Apportionment Plan (Note: Referred to as the Hatcher-Kleiner plan.)	
	Wayne County (part): Detroit (part)	1982 Apportionment Plan	
	Wayne County (part): Detroit (part; Upper East Side)	1992 Apportionment Plan	
	Wayne County (part): Detroit (part; Upper East Side); Hamtramck; Highland Park	2001 Apportionment Plan	
	Wayne County (part): Detroit (part; Southwest and some of the West Side)	2011 Apportionment Plan	
	Oakland County (part): Berkley (part); Birmingham (part); Bloomfield Township (part); Oak Park (part); Royal Oak (part); Southfield (part); Southfield Township (part); Wayne County (part): Detroit (part)	2021 Apportionment Plan (Note: Referred to as the Hickory plan.)	
	Oakland County (part): Oak Park (part); Royal Oak Township; Wayne County (part): Detroit (part)	Remedial 2021 Apportionment Plan Approved in 2024 (Note: Referred to as the Motown Sound FC E1 plan.)	

== Recent elections ==
=== 2020s ===
2026 Michigan House of Representatives election
Party	Candidate	Votes	%
Democratic	Candace Calloway	36,497	92.44
Republican	Chris Venable	2,986	7.56
Total votes		39,483	100
Democratic hold			

2024 Michigan House of Representatives election
Party	Candidate	Votes	%
Democratic	Regina Weiss	41,136	90.57
Republican	Will Sears	4,282	9.43
Total votes		45,418	100
Democratic hold			

2022 Michigan House of Representatives election
Party	Candidate	Votes	%
Democratic	Natalie Price	30,699	78.35
Republican	Paul Taros	8,481	21.65
Total votes		39,180	100
Democratic hold			

2020 Michigan House of Representatives election
Party	Candidate	Votes	%
Democratic	Cynthia A. Johnson (incumbent)	18,658	93.41
Republican	Harold M. Day	1,317	6.59
Total votes		19,975	100
Democratic hold			

=== 2010s ===
2018 Michigan House of Representatives election
Party	Candidate	Votes	%
Democratic	Cynthia A. Johnson	12,839	92.54
Republican	Dorothy Patterson	765	5.51
Write-In	Rita Ross	270	1.95
Total votes		13,874	100
Democratic hold			

2016 Michigan House of Representatives election
Party	Candidate	Votes	%
Democratic	Fred Durhal (incumbent)	17,832	92.51
Republican	Dorothy Patterson	1,444	7.49
Total votes		19,726	100
Democratic hold			

2014 Michigan House of Representatives election
Party	Candidate	Votes	%
Democratic	Fred Durhal	11,796	94.41
Republican	Dorothy Patterson	645	5.16
Write-In	Cynthia A. Johnson	50	0.4
Democratic Write-In	Tonya Renay Wells	3	0.02
Total votes		12,494	100
Democratic hold			

2012 Michigan House of Representatives election
Party	Candidate	Votes	%
Democratic	Fred Durhal, Jr.	22,996	94.21
Republican	Samuel R. Rodriguez	1,413	5.79
Total votes		24,409	100
Democratic hold			

2010 Michigan House of Representatives election
Party	Candidate	Votes	%
Democratic	John Olumba	11,763	89.91
Republican	Jermain Lee Jones	779	5.95
Independent	Muhammad Alim	541	4.14
Total votes		13,083	100
Democratic hold			

=== 2000s ===
2008 Michigan House of Representatives election
Party	Candidate	Votes	%
Democratic	Bert Johnson (incumbent)	25,595	100
Total votes		25,595	100
Democratic hold			

2006 Michigan House of Representatives election
Party	Candidate	Votes	%
Democratic	Bert Johnson	15,692	99.95
Write-In	Terry Catchings	8	0.05
Total votes		15,700	100
Democratic hold			

2004 Michigan House of Representatives election
Party	Candidate	Votes	%
Democratic	Bill McConico (incumbent)	23,625	100
Total votes		23,625	100
Democratic hold			

2002 Michigan House of Representatives election
Party	Candidate	Votes	%
Democratic	Bill McConico	13,967	92.83
Republican	Richard Maziarz	1,078	7.17
Total votes		15,045	100
Democratic hold			

2000 Michigan House of Representatives election
Party	Candidate	Votes	%
Democratic	Ken Daniels (incumbent)	21,645	95.84
Republican	Marie Kaigler	940	4.16
Total votes		22,585	100
Democratic hold			

=== 1990s ===
1998 Michigan House of Representatives election
Party	Candidate	Votes	%
Democratic	Ken Daniels	15,623	93.02
Republican	Yolanda Haynes	1,170	6.97
Write-In	Nathan Vinson	3	0.02
Total votes		16,796	100
Democratic hold			
