= Jimmy Womack =

American anesthesiologist, minister, and politician

Member of the Michigan House of Representatives from the 7th district
- In office 2009–2013
- Preceded by: Virgil Smith, Jr.
- Succeeded by: Thomas Stallworth III

Personal details
- Born: November 30, 1953 (age 72) Washington, D.C.
- Party: Democratic
- Spouse: Dr. Sophie Womack (deceased)
- Occupation: Anesthesiologist (retired), Minister, Politician

Reverend James Womack (born November 30, 1953) is an American politician and retired doctor from Detroit, Michigan. In 2008 he was elected to serve the citizens of the 7th District in the Michigan State House of Representatives. Along with his late wife, Dr. Sophie Womack, Jimmy Womack founded the non-profit organization Coalition Inc., which focuses on improving living conditions and reducing domestic violence for African-American families and children in the city of Detroit.

== Biography ==
Jimmy Womack was born on November 30, 1953, in Washington, D.C. Womack received his bachelor's degree at Dillard University in New Orleans, Louisiana, in 1976. He earned his Medical Degree from Meharry Medical College in Nashville, Tennessee, in 1982. He specialized in anesthesiology and pain management, and worked as a doctor in the Detroit area from 1982 to 1995. His wife, Dr. Sophie Womack, served as division chief of the department of neonatology at Sinai-Grace Hospital in Detroit. She later served as President of Detroit Medical Center's staff from 2004–2006, the first woman and African-American to hold that position.

In 1995, Womack retired from his full-time medical practice to pursue a Master of Divinity degree. In 1998 he became an ordained minister of the United Church of Christ. He and his wife founded the Coalition Inc., a non-profit organization that works to improve the lives of the people in the Detroit community. His wife, Sophie, died from surgery complications in 2008.

== Political career ==
Womack previously served as President of the Detroit Board of Education. In 2008, Womack announced his intention to run as a Democrat for the 7th State House Seat, which was at that time held by Democrat Virgil Smith, Jr. 16 other Democrats also ran, but Womack emerged victorious, winning 24% and defeating his closest opponent, Al Williams, by more than 300 votes. Because of the strongly Democratic nature of the 7th district (President Obama won over 95% of the vote), Womack was not opposed by a Republican candidate in the November General Election.

In the State House, Womack serves on the House Families and Children's Services Committee, Commerce Committee, Health Policy Committee, Insurance Committee, and Urban Policy Committee.

== Electoral history ==
- 2008 campaign for State House
  - Jimmy Womack (D), 95.7%
  - Derek Grigsby (Green), 4.3%
- 2008 campaign for State House, Democratic Primary
  - Jimmy Womack (D), 23.9%
  - Al Williams (D), 20.2%
  - Carol Weaver (D), 13.1%
  - Brenda Andrews (D), 11.1%
  - Lee Gaddies (D), 4.3%
  - Margaret Betts (D), 4.3%
  - Mary Sheffield (D), 3.4%
  - Henry Stallings (D), 3.3%
  - David S. Points (D), 2.7%
  - Earl Smith (D), 2.6%
