= Cynthia A. Johnson =

American politician (born 1958)

Member of the Michigan House of Representatives from the 5th district
- In office January 1, 2019 – December 31, 2022
- Preceded by: Fred Durhal III
- Succeeded by: Natalie Price

Personal details
- Born: August 19, 1958 (age 68) Detroit, Michigan
- Party: Democratic
- Education: Wayne County Community College; Walsh College

Cynthia A. Johnson (born August 19, 1958) is an American politician who served as a member of the Michigan House of Representatives from the 5th district from 2019 to 2022.

== Early life and education ==
Johnson was born on August 19, 1958, in the city of Detroit, Michigan. She graduated from Frank Cody High School. She was certified as a paralegal by the American Institute for Paralegal Studies. She earned an associate degree from Wayne County Community College and a bachelor’s degree in business management from Walsh College.

== Career ==
Johnson ran for office in the Michigan House of Representatives five times before being elected on November 6, 2018, as the representative from District 5. Since 2013, Johnson has hosted the radio show, StandUp Now with Cynthia A. Johnson. Johnson currently serves as Chaplain of the Michigan Legislative Black Caucus. During the beginning of her term, Johnson served on three committees: the Families, Children, and Seniors committee, the Agriculture committee, and as the Minority Chair of House Oversight.

On December 2, 2020, Johnson appeared on a House Oversight Committee panel, which heard testimony from Rudy Giuliani and four other witnesses in regard to alleged election fraud in the 2020 presidential election. Johnson disputed the claims of fraud. After the hearing, Johnson received voicemail lynching threats. Johnson posted a video in response to these threats, in which she warned supporters of President Donald Trump to "Be careful. Walk lightly", further stating that "And for those of you who are soldiers, you know how to do it. Do it right. Be in order. Make them pay." Laura Cox, chairwoman of the Michigan Republican Party found this video to be threatening to members of her party. On December 9, 2020, Michigan House Speaker Lee Chatfield, in a statement supported by Speaker-elect Jason Wentworth, removed Johnson from all three committees she had been a part of, because of the video's contents.

Johnson was disqualified from running in the 2022 Democratic primary for her re-election in the newly drawn 1st state House district, as she did not submit required campaign finance paperwork.

== Personal life ==
Around 1975, Johnson was married to Wallace F. Hoskins Jr. Johnson is a Christian.

Political offices
Preceded by Fred Durhal III	Michigan Representatives; 5th District; 2019–2022	Succeeded by Natalie Price
