= White Oak Township, Michigan =

- Civil township
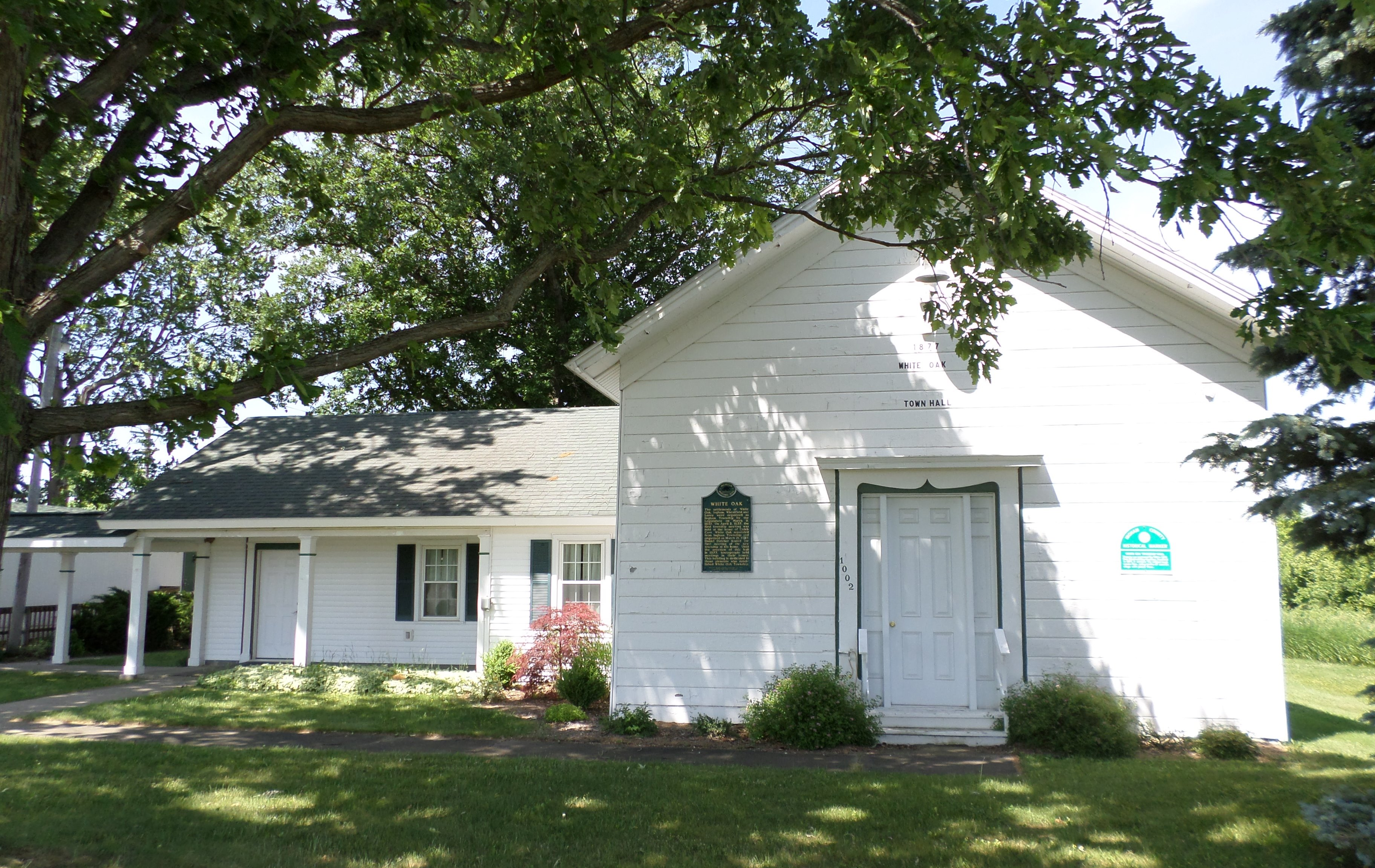
- Former White Oak Township Hall

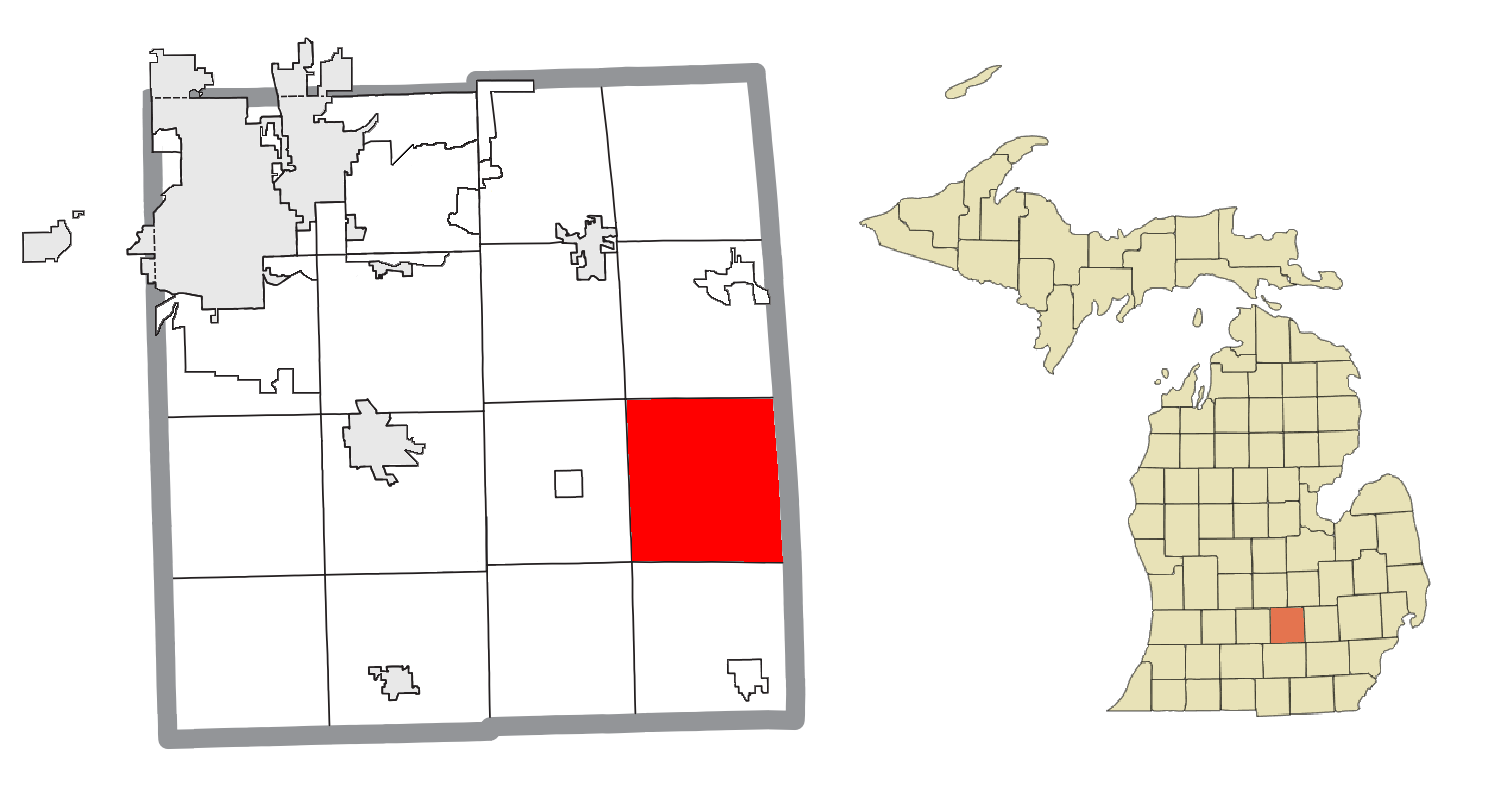
- Location within Ingham County

- Location within the state of Michigan Location within the United States
- Coordinates: 42°33′21″N 84°12′30″W
- Country: United States
- State: Michigan
- County: Ingham
- Organized: 1839

Government
  - Supervisor: Dorwin Marshall
  - Clerk: Leela Vernon

Area
  - Total: 36.48 sq mi (94.48 km^{2})
  - Land: 36.28 sq mi (93.96 km^{2})
  - Water: 0.20 sq mi (0.52 km^{2})
- Elevation: 928 ft (283 m)

Population (2020)
  - Total: 1,199
  - Density: 33.05/sq mi (12.76/km^{2})
- Time zone: UTC-5 (Eastern (EST))
  - Summer (DST): UTC-4 (EDT)
- ZIP code(s): 48819 (Dansville); 48892 (Webberville); 49285 (Stockbridge)
- Area code: 517
- FIPS code: 26-86900
- GNIS feature ID: 1627265
- Website: Official website

White Oak Township is a civil township of Ingham County in the U.S. state of Michigan. The population was 1,199 at the 2020 census.

== Geography ==
According to the United States Census Bureau, the township has a total area of 36.48 square miles (94.48 km^{2}), of which 36.28 square miles (93.96 km^{2}) is land and 0.20 square miles (0.52 km^{2}) (0.55%) is water.

== Demographics ==
As of the census of 2000, there were 1,177 people, 417 households, and 329 families residing in the township. The population density was 32.3 inhabitants per square mile (12.5/km^{2}). There were 430 housing units at an average density of 11.8 per square mile (4.6/km^{2}). The racial makeup of the township was 97.20% White, 0.59% African American, 0.76% Native American, 0.17% Asian, 0.59% from other races, and 0.68% from two or more races. Hispanic or Latino of any race were 2.63% of the population.

There were 417 households, out of which 35.7% had children under the age of 18 living with them, 68.3% were married couples living together, 5.3% had a female householder with no husband present, and 21.1% were non-families. 17.3% of all households were made up of individuals, and 7.2% had someone living alone who was 65 years of age or older. The average household size was 2.82 and the average family size was 3.15.

In the township the population was spread out, with 26.2% under the age of 18, 8.1% from 18 to 24, 30.8% from 25 to 44, 24.6% from 45 to 64, and 10.3% who were 65 years of age or older. The median age was 37 years. For every 100 females, there were 105.4 males. For every 100 females age 18 and over, there were 106.4 males.

The median income for a household in the township was $53,594, and the median income for a family was $57,250. Males had a median income of $41,111 versus $30,268 for females. The per capita income for the township was $21,670. About 1.9% of families and 4.5% of the population were below the poverty line, including 6.1% of those under age 18 and 5.0% of those age 65 or over.

== Highways ==
- M-36 runs briefly concurrent with M-52.
- M-52 runs south–north through the center of the township.
