= Marsha Cheeks =

American politician (born 1956)

Member of the Michigan House of Representatives from the 6th district
- In office January 1, 2003 – December 31, 2008
- Preceded by: William McConico
- Succeeded by: Fred Durhal, Jr.

Personal details
- Born: March 7, 1956 (age 70) Detroit, Michigan
- Party: Democratic
- Spouse: Divorced

Marsha G. Cheeks (born March 7, 1956) is a Detroit-born politician from the U.S. state of Michigan. She is a Democrat and member of the Michigan House of Representatives. She represents the 6th State House District, which includes most of Downtown Detroit. She is also the aunt of former Detroit mayor Kwame Kilpatrick and sister of United States Representative Carolyn Cheeks Kilpatrick.
