= Michigan's 67th House of Representatives district =

American legislative district

Michigan's 67th State House of Representatives district
Representative
Phil Green; R–Millington
- Demographics: 89% White; 2.3% Black; 3.7% Hispanic; 0.2% Asian; 0.2% Native American; 0.2% Other; 4.4% Multiracial
- Population (2024): 93,076

Michigan's 67th House of Representatives district (also referred to as Michigan's 67th House district) is a legislative district within the Michigan House of Representatives located in parts of Genesee, Lapeer, and Tuscola counties. The district was created in 1965, when the Michigan House of Representatives district naming scheme changed from a county-based system to a numerical one.

== List of representatives ==
Representative	Party	Dates	Residence	Notes
Albert A. Kramer	Democratic	1965–1970	Oak Park	
Joseph Forbes	Democratic	1971–1984	Oak Park	
David Gubow	Democratic	1985–1992	Huntington Woods	
Dan Gustafson	Republican	1993–1998	Williamston	Lived in Haslett until around 1995.
Paul N. DeWeese	Republican	1999–2002	Williamston	
Dianne Byrum	Democratic	2003–2006	Onondaga	
Barbara Byrum	Democratic	2007–2012	Onondaga	
Tom Cochran	Democratic	2013–2018	Mason	
Kara Hope	Democratic	2019–2022	Holt	
Phil Green	Republican	2023–present	Millington	

== Recent elections ==
=== 2020s ===
2026 Michigan House of Representatives election
Party	Candidate	Votes	%
Republican	Phil Green (incumbent)	25,494	58.62
Democratic	Leslie Getz	17,999	41.38
Total votes		43,493	100
Republican hold			

2024 Michigan House of Representatives election
Party	Candidate	Votes	%
Republican	Phil Green	34,024	63.8
Democratic	Anissa Buffin	19,277	36.2
Total votes		53,301	100
Republican hold			

2022 Michigan House of Representatives election
Party	Candidate	Votes	%
Republican	Phil Green	25,408	60.5
Democratic	Brian LaJoie	16,473	39.5
Total votes		41,994	100
Republican hold			

2020 Michigan House of Representatives election
Party	Candidate	Votes	%
Democratic	Kara Hope	28,503	54.3
Republican	Nate Ross	23,951	45.7
Total votes		52,454	100
Democratic hold			

2018 Michigan House of Representatives election
Party	Candidate	Votes	%
Democratic	Kara Hope	22,565	53.7
Republican	Leon R. Clark	18,454	43.9
Libertarian	Zachary Moreau	994	2.4
Total votes		42,013	100
Democratic hold			

2016 Michigan House of Representatives election
Party	Candidate	Votes	%
Democratic	Tom Cochran	24,929	54.6
Republican	Leon Clark	20,698	45.4
Total votes		45,627	100
Democratic hold			

2014 Michigan House of Representatives election
Party	Candidate	Votes	%
Democratic	Tom Cochran	16,975	54.3
Republican	John Hayhoe	14,280	45.7
Total votes		31,255	100
Democratic hold			

2012 Michigan House of Representatives election
Party	Candidate	Votes	%
Democratic	Tom Cochran	24,916	56.4
Republican	Jeff Oesterle	19,275	43.6
Total votes		44,191	100
Democratic hold			

2010 Michigan House of Representatives election
Party	Candidate	Votes	%
Democratic	Barb Byrum	17,962	52.6
Republican	Jeff Oesterle	16,177	47.4
Total votes		34,139	100
Democratic hold			

2008 Michigan House of Representatives election
Party	Candidate	Votes	%
Democratic	Barb Byrum	30,692	62.9
Republican	Mike Herter	16,794	34.4
Libertarian	Vince Dragonetti	1,347	2.8
Total votes		48,833	100
Democratic hold			

== Historical district boundaries ==
Map	Description	Apportionment Plan	Notes
	Oakland County (part): Berkley; Oak Park (part); Royal Oak Township; Southfield (part)	1964 Apportionment Plan	
	Oakland County (part): Oak Park (part); Royal Oak Township; Southfield (part); Lathrup Village	1972 Apportionment Plan	
	Oakland County (part): Berkley; Ferndale; Huntington Woods; Oak Park; Royal Oak Township	1982 Apportionment Plan	
	Ingham County (part): Bunker Hill Township; Ingham Township; Leroy Township; Leslie; Leslie Township; Locke Township; Mason; Onondaga Township; Stockbridge Township; Vevay Township; Wheatfield Township; White Oak Township; Williamston; Williamstown Township; Meridian Township (part); Livingston County (part): Cohoctah Township; Conway Township; Deerfield Township; Handy Township; Howell Township; Iosco Township; Putnam Township; Tyrone Township; Unadilla Township	1992 Apportionment Plan	
	Ingham County (part): Alaiedon Township; Aurelius Township; Bunker Hill Township; Delhi Charter Township; Ingham Township; Lansing (part); Leroy Township; Leslie; Leslie Township; Locke Township; Mason; Onondaga Township; Stockbridge Township; Vevay Township; Wheatfield Township; White Oak Township; Williamston; Williamstown Township (part)	2001 Apportionment Plan	
	Ingham County (part): Alaiedon Township; Aurelius Township; Bunker Hill Township; Delhi Charter Township; Ingham Township; Lansing (part); Leroy Township; Leslie; Leslie Township; Mason; Onondaga Township; Stockbridge Township; Vevay Township; Wheatfield Township; White Oak Township; Williamston	2011 Apportionment Plan	
