= Fred Durhal Jr. =

American politician (1951–2025)

Member of the Michigan House of Representatives from the 5th district 6th District (2009–2012)
- In office January 1, 2009 – December 31, 2014
- Preceded by: Marsha Cheeks
- Succeeded by: Fred Durhal III

Member of the Michigan House of Representatives from the 9th district
- In office September 9, 2002 – December 31, 2002
- Preceded by: Kwame Kilpatrick
- Succeeded by: Tupac Hunter

Personal details
- Pronunciation: Derhall
- Born: Frederick Charles Durhal Jr. December 27, 1951 Rochester, New York, U.S.
- Died: November 19, 2025 (aged 73)
- Party: Democratic
- Children: 6
- Parent(s): Fred Sr. & Doris Jean Durhal
- Education: Attended Wayne State University, Wayne County Community College, University of Phoenix
- Occupation: Politician

Fred Durhal Jr. (December 27, 1951 – November 19, 2025) was an American politician who served as a member of the Michigan House of Representatives.

== Life and career ==
Durhal was born on December 27, 1951, to Doris Jean and Fred Durhal Sr., in Rochester, New York, the family moved to Detroit in 1952. Durhal attended schools in Detroit graduating from Detroit's Northwestern High School (Michigan). He then attended Wayne State University, Wayne County Community College District and the University of Phoenix. Majoring in Political Science and Government Administration. Rep. Durhal was divorced, and the father of six children.

He was first elected to the House of Representatives in 2002, after a contentious court battle with then Gov. John Engler, who refused to schedule a special election to fill the seat vacated by the election of Kwame Kilpatrick as Mayor of Detroit. Durhal sued Gov. Engler in federal court and eventually won the right to have the election scheduled. Durhal then won the vacant seat. Mr. Durhal served three and one half terms making him the last "Dean" (highest seniority) member of the legislature.

Prior to being elected, Durhal served as the Executive Director of the Virginia Park Citizens District Council, the nonprofit community organization responsible for the rehabilitation of the Detroit neighborhood that was ravaged during the 1967 Riots. Durhal served as an assistant to Detroit Mayor Coleman A. Young; District Director for U.S. Congresswoman Barbara Rose Collins (D, 13th Dist. Michigan); Community Development Specialist for the Michigan Economic Development Corporation (MEDC), Program Manager for the Michigan Land Bank Fast Track Authority; Economic Development Director on Loan from the state MEDC to the City of Highland Park, Michigan; Deputy Director of the Detroit Charter Revision Commission, He served as the first Black Political Director of the Michigan State Democratic Party; as Communication Specialist for the Michigan House of Representatives Central Staff; Executive Director and later Chairman of the Michigan Legislative Black Caucus; .During his election as State Representative in 2008 Durhal was elected on the same ticket as U.S. Senator Barack Obama, the first Black U.S. President. Durhal's legislative record includes, Appropriations Chair of General Government; Vice Chairman of Corrections Appropriations Sub Committee, Co-Sponsor, Michigan Amber Alert Acts; Sponsor of Detroit Bankruptcy 'Grand Bargain' Act that released the city from the historic Chapter 9 Bankruptcy by transferring $1.8 M from state government to the city to save pensions for city workers. Durhal has numerous Public Acts signed into law.

Durhal died on November 19, 2025, at the age of 73.
