= Fred Durhal III =

American politician (born 1984)

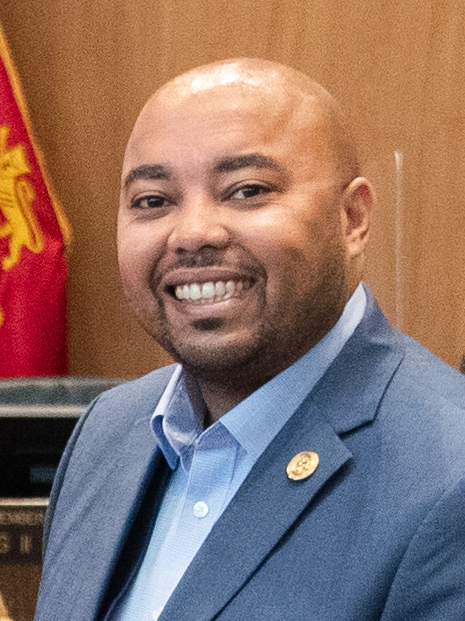
- Durhal in 2024

Member of the Detroit City Council from the 7th district
- In office January 1, 2021 – December 31, 2025
- Preceded by: Gabe Leland

Member of the Michigan House of Representatives from the 5th district
- In office January 1, 2015 – January 1, 2019
- Preceded by: Fred Durhal, Jr.
- Succeeded by: Cynthia A. Johnson

Personal details
- Born: April 1, 1984 (age 42) Detroit, Michigan, U.S.
- Party: Democratic
- Spouse: Briaunna Buckner
- Relatives: Fred (father)
- Education: Eastern Michigan University (BA)

Frederick Durhal III (born April 1, 1984) is an American politician who served as a member of the Detroit City Council from 2021 to 2025. A member of the Democratic Party, Durhal served as a member of the Michigan House of Representatives from 2015 to 2019, having succeeded his father, Fred Durhal, Jr., in the seat. He was a candidate in the 2025 Detroit mayoral election.

== Early life and career ==
Durhal was born in Detroit to his parents, Fred and Martha Durhal. He is the second eldest of six children. Durhal attended Detroit Public Schools, including Guyton Elementary, Spain Middle School, and graduated from Detroit School of Arts. He later attended Eastern Michigan University, where he studied political science and music education.

Prior to his election, he served as an AmeriCorps volunteer in Northwest Detroit as the director of a literacy program for young children. He has collaborated with Village Builders of Northwest Detroit and Motor City Blight Busters to help stabilize neighborhoods within Detroit. In 2011, Durhal joined other community leaders to oppose Michigan’s emergency financial manager law in Benton Harbor and across the state. Durhal has also worked with Habitat for Humanity to help rebuild homes in Detroit. In 2004, he traveled to Benton Harbor with Habitat for Humanity, where he helped with the rebuilding of over 50 homes in one weekend.

Durhal has been a member of the Detroit Branch of the National Association for the Advancement of Colored People (NAACP), the Rainbow PUSH Coalition, and a former member of the Teamsters Local 377. He previously served on the board of the Dexter Elmhurst Community Center, and was formerly the President of Wayne County Progress PAC.

== Political career ==
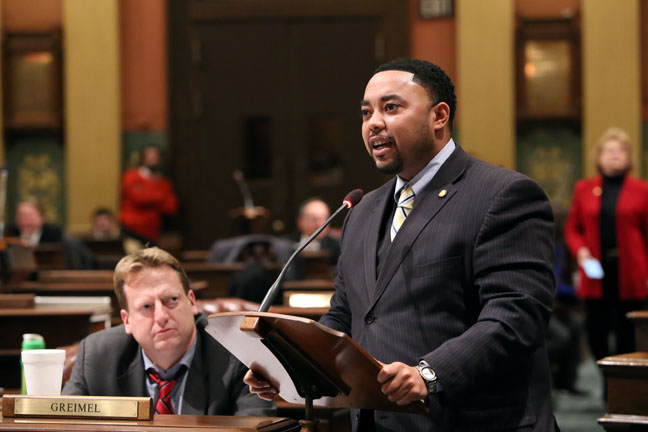
Speaking on the Floor of the Michigan House of Representatives. (2016)

Durhal was elected to the Michigan House of Representatives in 2014, succeeding his father. Taking office in January, 2015, he quickly found himself a leader in the Democratic caucus. He was appointed to the powerful House Appropriations Committee, serving as minority vice-chairman of the subcommittee on general government. House Democratic Leader Tim Greimel also appointed him Assistant Democratic Leader.

Durhal continued the work of his father, reintroducing legislation that would prohibit employers from requiring applicants to disclose prior felony convictions on job applications, so called "ban the box" legislation.

In 2016, Durhal passed his first bill HB 4187, which was signed into law by Governor Rick Snyder on May 10, 2016, and became PA 111 of 2016. This legislation established a misdemeanor for anyone who defaces, destroys, or dismantles any highway sign, traffic sign, structure, or railroad in the State.

After being re-elected to a second term in 2016, Durhal was appointed by Speaker of the House Tom Leonard and House Democratic Leader Sam Singh to serve as the Minority Vice-Chair of the House Appropriations Committee, making him the ranking Democrat on the committee. He was also elected by his Detroit colleagues to serve as the Secretary of the Detroit Caucus.

In 2021, Durhal was elected to the Detroit City Council to represent the 7th District. Shortly after being elected, Durhal was appointed December 1, 2021, to fill the vacancy for the 7th District. He was sworn into his second term on January 1, 2022. Durhal was appointed to serve as Chair of the Budget, Finance, and Audit Standing Committee and Vice-Chair of the Planning and Economic Development Standing Committee. Durhal also serves as a member of the Eastern Market Partnership Board of Directors.

Durhal placed sixth in the 2025 Detroit mayoral primary election.

== Election Results (2014) ==
Durhal was successful in winning the November 2014 General Election to be elected to his first term.

State House – 5th District (Wayne (southwest Detroit))
| Party | Candidate | Votes | % |
|---|---|---|---|
| Democratic | Fred Durhal III | 11,795 | 94.82 |
| Republican | Dorothy Patterson | 645 | 5.18 |
| Total votes | | 12,440 | 100.0 |

== Election Results (2016) ==
Durhal was re-elected to his second term by winning the November 2016 General Election.

State House – 5th District (Wayne (southwest Detroit))
| Party | Candidate | Votes | % |
|---|---|---|---|
| Democratic | Fred Durhal III | 17,827 | 92.52 |
| Republican | Dorothy Patterson | 1,443 | 7.48 |
| Total votes | | 19,270 | 100.0 |

== Personal life ==
Fred Durhal is married to Briaunna Buckner Durhal, an attorney. Together they have two children.
