= William McConico =

American politician (born 1973)

Chief Judge of the 36th District Court of Michigan
- Incumbent
- Assumed office June 23, 2010
- Appointed by: Jennifer Granholm
- Preceded by: C. Lorene Royster

Member of the Michigan House of Representatives
- In office January 1, 2001 – December 31, 2006
- Preceded by: Martha G. Scott
- Succeeded by: Bert Johnson
- Constituency: 5th district (2001–2002); 6th district (2003–2006)

Personal details
- Born: May 27, 1973 (age 53)

William McConico is the Chief Judge of Michigan's 36th District Court, the busiest court in Michigan and the fifth-busiest court in America. He was appointed Chief Judge by the Supreme Court of Michigan in 2019. He was appointed to the 36th district court initially by Michigan governor Jennifer Granholm in 2010. Before he was named to the bench, McConico served in the Michigan House of Representatives from 2000 to 2006. Between serving as a state representative and becoming a judge, McConico served as the City Attorney for the City of Highland Park, Michigan while Highland Park was under emergency management. Bill is a 1991 graduate of University of Detroit Jesuit High School.
