= 2014 Michigan Senate election =

- November 4, 2014

38 seats in the Michigan Senate 20 seats needed for a majority
- Turnout: 2,919,926 (39.21%)
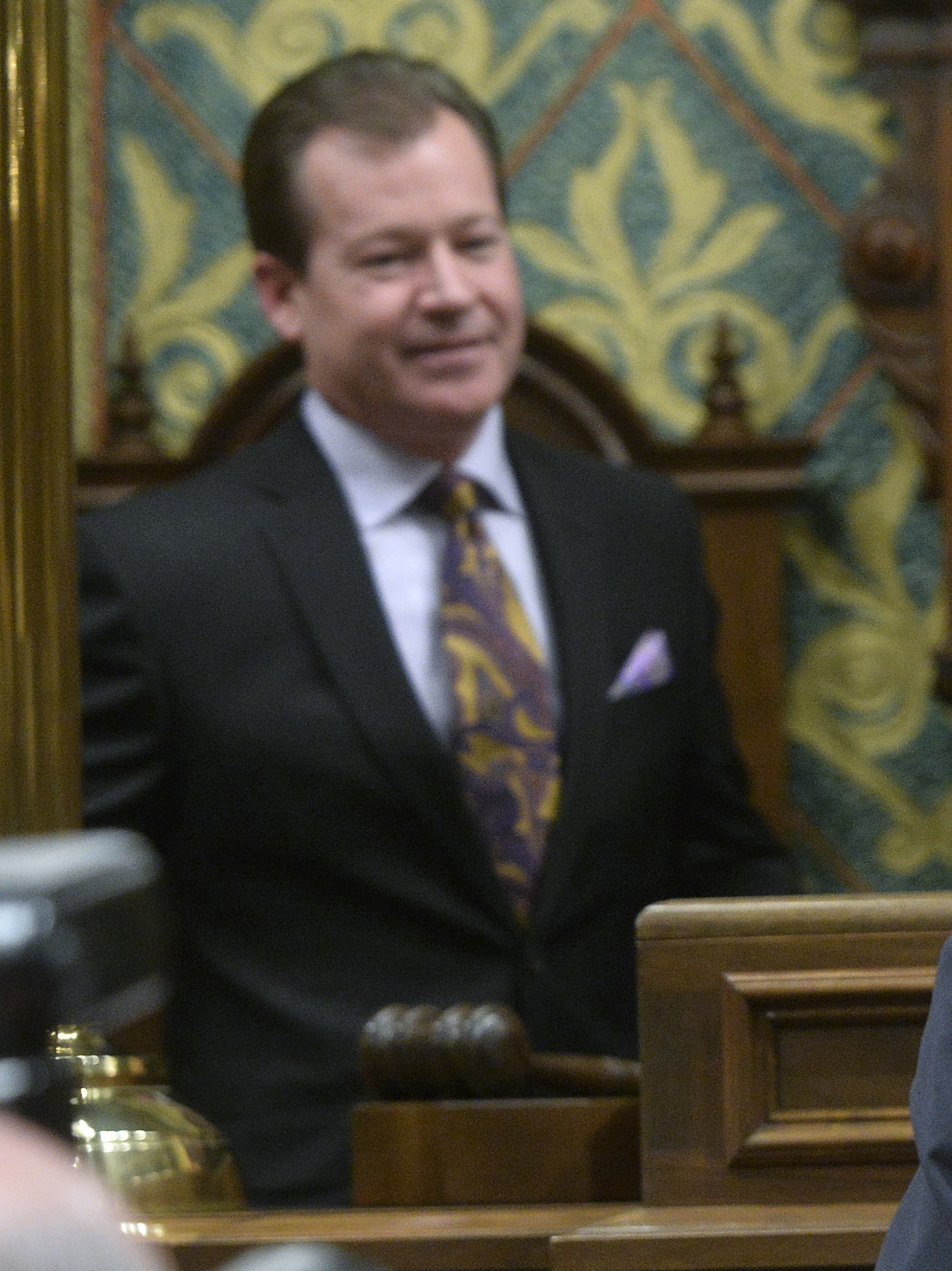

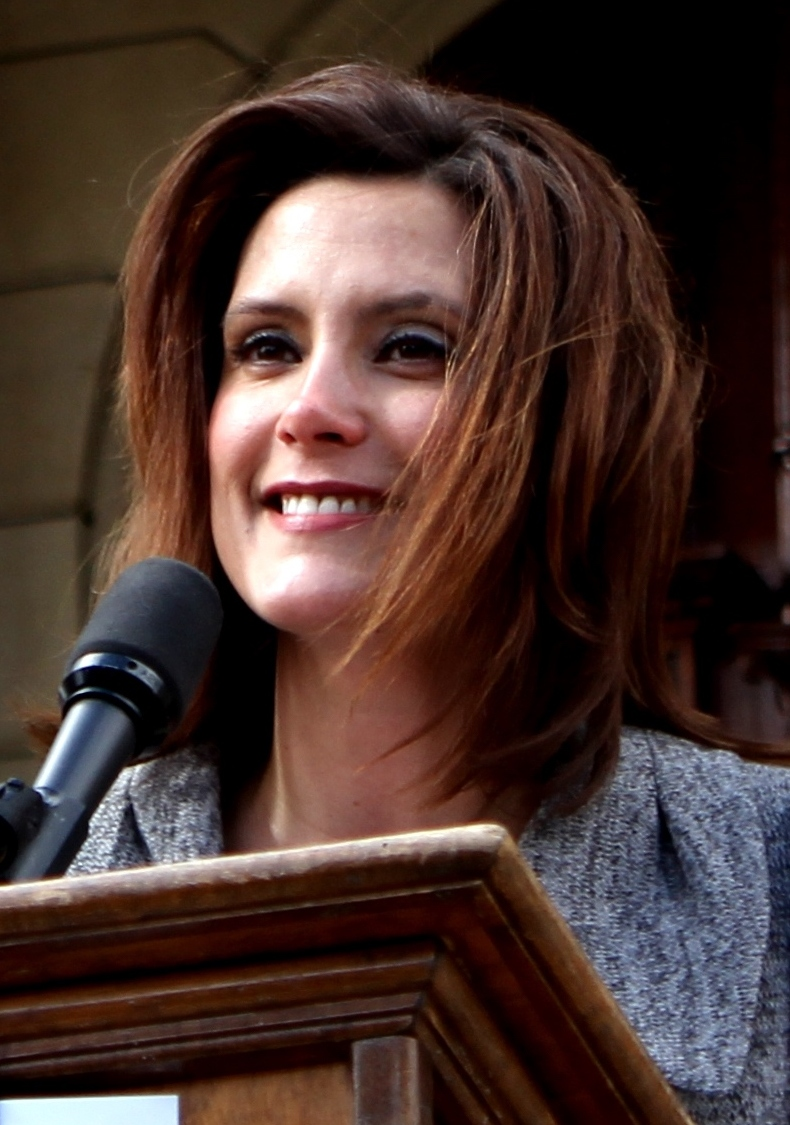
	Majority party	Minority party
Leader	Randy Richardville (term-limited)	Gretchen Whitmer (term-limited)
Party	Republican	Democratic
Leader since	January 1, 2011	January 1, 2011
Leader's seat	17th–Monroe	23rd—East Lansing
Seats before	26	12
Seats after	27	11
Seat change	▲1	▼1
Popular vote	1,499,097	1,420,829
Percentage	49.80%	47.20%
- Results: Republican gain Democratic gain Republican hold Democratic hold
Majority Leader before election
Randy Richardville
Republican
Elected Majority Leader
Arlan Meekhof
Republican

Elections for the Michigan Senate was held on Tuesday, November 4, 2014, with partisan primary elections to select the party's nominees held on August 5. All 38 seats in the Michigan Senate were contested, and those elected will serve in the 98th and 99th Michigan Legislatures. This was the first election for the Michigan Senate contested under the constituency boundaries drawn in consequence of the 2010 U.S. census. The election resulted in the Republicans expanding their majority to 27 seats over the Democrats 11 seats.

== Predictions ==
Source	Ranking	As of
Governing	Safe R	October 20, 2014

== Members not seeking re-election ==
State Senators are only allowed to serve 2 four-year terms, a maximum of 8 years. The following Senators were not running for a new term in 2014.

District	Senator	Party	Residence	Term-limited?
5	Tupac Hunter	Dem	Detroit	Yes
6	Glenn S. Anderson	Dem	Westland	Yes
13	John Pappageorge	Rep	Troy	Yes
16	Bruce Caswell	Rep	Hillsdale	No (retiring)
17	Randy Richardville	Rep	Monroe	Yes
23	Gretchen Whitmer	Dem	East Lansing	Yes
28	Mark Jansen	Rep	Gaines Township	Yes
32	Roger Kahn	Rep	Saginaw Township	Yes
36	John Moolenaar	Rep	Midland	No (running for Congress)
37	Howard Walker	Rep	Traverse City	No (retiring)

== Results ==
Due to the redistricting done as a result of the 2010 U.S. Census, there were consolidation of districts that resulted in a "new" 26th District to be created. The new 26th District was a won by the Republicans, causing a gain for Republicans as consolidation effectively resulted in two Democratic held districts being merged. A recount in the 20th District resulted in Margaret O'Brien's win widening from 59 votes to 61 votes. The election resulted in the Republicans expanding their majority to 27 seats over the Democrats 11 seats.

Shortly after the election, Arlan Meekhof, Republican from the 30th District, was elected Senate Majority Leader, Mike Kowall, Republican from the 15th District, was elected Senate Majority Floor Leader, Jim Ananich, Democrat from the 27th District, was elected Senate Minority Leader, and Morris Hood III, Democrat from the 3rd District, was elected Senate Minority Floor Leader.

Popular vote
Democratic	47.20%
Republican	49.80%
Other	3%

House seats
Republican	71.05%
Democratic	28.94%

=== District 1-9 ===
1st District (Wayne County (Brownstown Township, southeast Detroit, Ecorse, Gibraltar, Grosse Ile Township, River Rouge, Riverview, Trenton, Woodhaven, Wyandotte))
Party	Candidate	Votes	%
Democratic	Coleman Young II (incumbent)	48,518	71.84
Republican	Barry Berk	19,021	28.16
Total votes		67,539	100.0
Democratic hold			

2nd District (Wayne County (central and east Detroit, Grosse Pointe Park, Grosse Pointe, Grosse Pointe Farms, Grosse Pointe Shores, Grosse Pointe Township, Grosse Pointe Woods, Hamtramck, Harper Woods, Highland Park))
Party	Candidate	Votes	%
Democratic	Bert Johnson (incumbent)	40,500	71.07
Republican	Mark Price	14,326	25.14
Independent	Jeffrey Hall	2,163	3.80
Total votes		56,989	100.0
Democratic hold			

3rd District (Wayne County (west Detroit, Dearborn, Melvindale))
Party	Candidate	Votes	%
Democratic	Morris Hood III (incumbent)	45,572	80.43
Republican	Matthew Keller	11,086	19.57
Total votes		56,658	100.0
Democratic hold			

4th District (Wayne County (northwest and west Detroit, Allen Park, Lincoln Park, Southgate))
Party	Candidate	Votes	%
Democratic	Virgil Smith, Jr. (incumbent)	44,597	83.96
Republican	Keith Franklin	8,522	16.04
Total votes		53,119	100.0
Democratic hold			

5th District (Wayne County (northwest and west Detroit, Dearborn Heights, Inkster, Garden City, Redford Township))
Party	Candidate	Votes	%
Democratic	David Knezek	58,501	82.18
Republican	Jennifer Rynicki	12,683	17.82
Total votes		71,184	100.0
Democratic hold			

6th District (Wayne County (Belleville, Flat Rock, Huron Township, Rockwood, Romulus, Sumpter Township, Taylor, Van Buren Township, Westland))
Party	Candidate	Votes	%
Democratic	Hoon-Yung Hopgood (incumbent)	41,813	62.37
Republican	Darrell McNeill	25,222	37.63
Total votes		67,035	100.0
Democratic hold			

7th District (Wayne County (Canton Township, Livonia, Northville-excluding portion outside county, Northville Township, Plymouth, Plymouth Township, Wayne))
Party	Candidate	Votes	%
Republican	Patrick Colbeck (incumbent)	49,503	52.17
Democratic	Dian Slavens	45,378	47.83
Total votes		94,881	100.0
Republican hold			

8th District (Macomb County (Bruce Township, Chesterfield Township, Harrison Township, Lenox Township, Mount Clemens, Ray Township, Shelby Township, St. Clair Shores, Utica, Washington Township))
Party	Candidate	Votes	%
Republican	Jack Brandenburg (incumbent)	55,302	61.73
Democratic	Christine Bell	34,278	38.27
Total votes		89,580	100.0
Republican hold			

9th District (Macomb County (south Clinton Township, Fraser, Warren, Center Line, Eastpointe, Roseville))
Party	Candidate	Votes	%
Democratic	Steven Bieda (incumbent)	48,144	67.96
Republican	Hawke Fracassa	22,696	32.04
Total votes		70,840	100.0
Democratic hold			

=== Districts 10-19 ===
10th District (Macomb County (Sterling Heights, north Clinton Township, Macomb Township))
Party	Candidate	Votes	%
Republican	Tory Rocca (incumbent)	51,464	62.67
Democratic	Kenneth Jenkins	30,656	37.33
Total votes		82,120	100.0
Republican hold			

11th District (Oakland County (Farmington Hills, Farmington, Lathrup Village, Southfield, Madison Heights, Oak Park, Huntington Woods, Pleasant Ridge, Hazel Park, Ferndale, and Royal Oak Township))
Party	Candidate	Votes	%
Democratic	Vincent Gregory (incumbent)	70,866	73.28
Republican	Boris Tuman	22,847	23.62
Libertarian	James Young	2,994	3.10
Total votes		96,707	100.0
Democratic hold			

12th District (Oakland County (Oxford Township, Addison Township, Independence Township, Clarkston, Orion Township, Oakland Township, Auburn Hills, Pontiac, Sylvan Lake, Keego Harbor, Southfield Township, and Bloomfield Township))
Party	Candidate	Votes	%
Republican	Jim Marleau (incumbent)	50,116	57.48
Democratic	Paul Secrest	37,067	42.52
Total votes		87,183	100.0
Republican hold			

13th District (Oakland County (Birmingham, Rochester, Rochester Hills, Troy, Bloomfield Hills, Clawson, Royal Oak, and Berkley))
Party	Candidate	Votes	%
Republican	Marty Knollenberg	59,555	58.15
Democratic	Cyndi Peltonen	42,855	41.85
Total votes		102,410	100.0
Republican hold			

14th District (Genesee (Atlas Township, Davison, Davison Township, Grand Blanc, Grand Blanc Township, Mundy Township, and Fenton), and Oakland Counties (Brandon Township, Groveland Township, Springfield Township, Waterford Township, Lake Angelus, Holly Township, Rose Township, and Highland Township))
Party	Candidate	Votes	%
Republican	David B. Robertson (incumbent)	46,832	57.58
Democratic	Bobbie Walton	34,505	42.42
Total votes		81,337	100.0
Republican hold			

15th District (Oakland County (White Lake Township, Milford Township, Commerce Township, Walled Lake, West Bloomfield Township, Orchard Lake Village, Wixom, Lyon Township, South Lyon, Novi, Novi Township, Northville—excluding portion outside county))
Party	Candidate	Votes	%
Republican	Mike Kowall (incumbent)	52,799	58.48
Democratic	Michael Smith	37,487	41.52
Total votes		90,286	100.0
Republican hold			

16th District (Branch, Hillsdale, and Jackson Counties)
Party	Candidate	Votes	%
Republican	Mike Shirkey	40,916	60.95
Democratic	Kevin Commet	26,215	39.05
Total votes		67,131	100.0
Republican hold			

17th District (Lenawee, and Monroe Counties)
Party	Candidate	Votes	%
Republican	Dale Zorn	38,445	51.13
Democratic	Doug Spade	34,704	46.16
Constitution	Jeff Andring	2,040	2.71
Total votes		75,189	100.0
Republican hold			

18th District (Washtenaw County (Ann Arbor, Ann Arbor Township, Augusta Township, portions of Milan, Michigan in the county, Saline, York Township, Pittsfield Township, Salem Township, Superior Township, Ypsilanti, and Ypsilanti Township))
Party	Candidate	Votes	%
Democratic	Rebekah Warren (incumbent)	61,406	72.11
Republican	Terry Linden	23,748	27.89
Total votes		85,154	100.0
Democratic hold			

19th District (Barry, Calhoun, and Ionia Counties)
Party	Candidate	Votes	%
Republican	Mike Nofs (incumbent)	44,797	61.59
Democratic	Greg Grieves	27,936	38.41
Total votes		72,733	100.0
Republican hold			

=== Districts 20-29 ===
20th District (Kalamazoo County)
Party	Candidate	Votes	%
Republican	Margaret O'Brien	36,645	45.58
Democratic	Sean McCann	36,584	45.50
Libertarian	Lorence Wenke	7,171	8.92
Total votes		80,400	100.0
Republican hold			

21st District (Berrien, Cass, and St. Joseph Counties)
Party	Candidate	Votes	%
Republican	John Proos (incumbent)	45,586	65.40
Democratic	Bette Pierman	25,092	35.50
Total votes		70,678	100.0
Republican hold			

22nd District (Livingston, and Washtenaw Counties (Dexter Township, Freedom Township, Bridgewater Township, Lodi Township, Manchester Township, Saline Township, Lima Township, Lyndon Township, Northfield Township, Scio Township, Sharon Township, Sylvan Township, Webster Township, and Chelsea))
Party	Candidate	Votes	%
Republican	Joe Hune (incumbent)	58,374	58.85
Democratic	Shari Pollesch	37,704	38.01
Libertarian	Jeff Wood	3,108	3.13
Total votes		99,186	100.0
Republican hold			

23rd District (Ingham County (Alaiedon Township, Aurelius Township, Bunker Hill Township, Delhi Township, East Lansing—excluding portion outside county, Lansing—excluding portion outside county, Leslie, Leslie Township, Mason, Stockbridge Township, Vevay Township, Meridian Township, Onondaga Township, and White Oak Township))
Party	Candidate	Votes	%
Democratic	Curtis Hertel Jr.	49,717	65.83
Republican	Craig Whitehead	25,809	34.17
Total votes		75,526	100.0
Democratic hold			

24th District (Clinton, Eaton, Shiawassee, and Ingham Counties (Leroy Township, Locke Township, Wheatfield Township, Williamston, and Williamstown Township))
Party	Candidate	Votes	%
Republican	Rick Jones (incumbent)	55,999	55.90
Democratic	Dawn Levey	44,173	44.10
Total votes		100,172	100.0
Republican hold			

25th District (Huron, Sanilac, St. Clair, and Macomb Counties (Armada Township, Memphis, Richmond, and Richmond Township))
Party	Candidate	Votes	%
Republican	Phil Pavlov (incumbent)	46,283	55.85
Democratic	Terry Brown	36,591	44.15
Total votes		82,874	100.0
Republican hold			

26th District (Allegan, Van Buren, and Kent Counties (Gaines Township, and Kentwood))
Party	Candidate	Votes	%
Republican	Tonya Schuitmaker (incumbent)	47,245	61.38
Democratic	Jim Walters	26,781	34.79
Libertarian	William Wenzel	2,944	3.82
Total votes		76,970	100.0
Republican win (new seat)			

27th District (Genesee County (Burton, Clio, Forest Township, Mount Morris, Mount Morris Township, Flint, Flint Township, Genesee Township, Richfield Township, Swartz Creek, Thetford Township, and Vienna Township))
Party	Candidate	Votes	%
Democratic	Jim Ananich (incumbent)	51,296	77.31
Republican	Brendt Gerics	15,057	22.69
Total votes		66,353	100.0
Democratic hold			

28th District (Kent County (Algoma Township, Alpine Township, Byron Township, Cannon Township, Cedar Springs, Courtland Township, Grandville, Grattan Township, Nelson Township, Oakfield Township, Plainfield Township, Rockford, Solon Township, Sparta Township, Spencer Township, Tyrone Township, Vergennes Township, Walker, and Wyoming))
Party	Candidate	Votes	%
Republican	Peter MacGregor	53,222	66.14
Democratic	Deb Havens	25,133	31.23
Constitution	Ted Gerrard	2,114	2.63
Total votes		80,469	100.0
Republican hold			

29th District (Kent County (Ada Township, Bowne Township, Caledonia Township, Cascade Township, East Grand Rapids, Grand Rapids, Grand Rapids Township, Lowell, and Lowell Township))
Party	Candidate	Votes	%
Republican	Dave Hildenbrand (incumbent)	47,203	57.93
Democratic	Lance Penny	34,280	42.07
Total votes		81,483	100.0
Republican hold			

=== Districts 30-38 ===
30th District (Ottawa County)
Party	Candidate	Votes	%
Republican	Arlan Meekhof (incumbent)	62,337	71.39
Democratic	Sarah Howard	24,987	28.61
Total votes		87,324	100.0
Republican hold			

31st District (Bay, Lapeer, and Tuscola Counties)
Party	Candidate	Votes	%
Republican	Mike Green (incumbent)	40,678	56.09
Democratic	Ron Mindykowski	31,843	43.91
Total votes		72,521	100.0
Republican hold			

32nd District (Saginaw, and Genesee Counties (Argentine Township, Clayton Township, Fenton Township, Flushing, Flushing Township, Gaines Township, Linden, Montrose, Montrose Township))
Party	Candidate	Votes	%
Republican	Kenneth Horn	49,449	54.35
Democratic	Stacy Erwin Oakes	41,538	45.65
Total votes		90,987	100.0
Republican hold			

33rd District (Clare, Gratiot, Isabella, Mecosta, and Montcalm Counties)
Party	Candidate	Votes	%
Republican	Judy Emmons (incumbent)	36,416	57.21
Democratic	Fred Sprague	27,234	42.79
Total votes		63,650	100.0
Republican hold			

34th District (Muskegon, Newaygo, and Oceana Counties)
Party	Candidate	Votes	%
Republican	Goeff Hansen (incumbent)	39,130	55.60
Democratic	Cathy Forbes	31,245	44.40
Total votes		70,375	100.0
Republican hold			

35th District (Benzie, Crawford, Kalkaska, Lake, Leelanau, Manistee, Mason, Missaukee, Ogemaw, Osceola, Roscommon, and Wexford Counties)
Party	Candidate	Votes	%
Republican	Darwin L. Booher (incumbent)	51,295	59.53
Democratic	Glenn Lottie	34,869	40.47
Total votes		86,164	100.0
Republican hold			

36th District (Arenac, Alcona, Alpena, Gladwin, Iosco, Midland, Montmorency, Oscoda, Otsego, and Presque Isle Counties)
Party	Candidate	Votes	%
Republican	Jim Stamas	51,841	61.12
Democratic	Joe Lukasiewicz	32,978	38.88
Total votes		84,819	100.0
Republican hold			

37th District (Chippewa, Luce, Mackinac, Emmet, Cheboygan, Charlevoix, Antrim, and Grand Traverse Counties)
Party	Candidate	Votes	%
Republican	Wayne Schmidt	54,980	61.08
Democratic	Phil Bellfy	35,026	38.92
Total votes		90,006	100.0
Republican hold			

38th District (Keweenaw, Houghton, Ontonagon, Gogebic, Baraga, Iron, Marquette, Dickinson, Menominee, Delta, Alger, and Schoolcraft Counties)
Party	Candidate	Votes	%
Republican	Tom Casperson (incumbent)	50,689	61.84
Democratic	Christopher Germain	31,278	38.16
Total votes		81,967	100.0
Republican hold			

=== Maps ===
Results shaded by the percentage of the party vote in each district

Support for Republican Party candidates by district

Support for Democratic Party candidates by district

== Special election ==
On November 8, 2016, a special election was held in the 4th District to fill the vacancy left when Virgil Smith Jr. resigned.

4th District (Wayne (part))
Party	Candidate	Votes	%
Democratic	Ian Conyers	68,882	76.46
Republican	Keith Franklin	21,206	23.54
Total votes		90,088	100.0
Democratic hold			

== See also ==
- Michigan House of Representatives election, 2014
