= Mark Slavens =

American politician

Circuit Court Judge, Wayne County
- Incumbent
- Assumed office April 23, 2007
- Appointed by: Jennifer M. Granholm

Personal details
- Born: December 31, 1954 (age 71) Canton, Michigan, U.S.
- Party: Democratic
- Spouse: Dian Slavens
- Education: University of Michigan, University of Toledo
- Profession: Lawyer, Judge

Mark Slavens (born December 31, 1954) is an American politician from Canton, Michigan. He is currently a Circuit Court Judge.

Slavens attained a BGS from the University of Michigan at Ann Arbor. He received his Juris Doctor from the University of Toledo. He graduated from Ann Arbor Huron High School in Michigan.

== Wayne County Third Circuit Court ==
On April 23, 2007, Michigan Governor Jennifer M. Granholm appointed Slavens to the Third Circuit Court of Wayne County. He filled the unexpired term of the Honorable Maggie Drake, who stepped down effective January 1, 2007. Drake, who had been re-elected during the 2004 general election, would have otherwise served until 2010. As a result, Slavens' term will be up for election during the 2008 general election for the remainder of the term. He was re-elected to the Wayne County Circuit Court in 2010 and 2016.

== Plymouth-Canton School Board ==
Slavens was Vice President of the Plymouth-Canton Community Schools (PCCS) Board of Education. He previously served as President of the School Board for two years. He was first elected to the School Board in 1999 and elected to a second term with over 75% of the vote in 2003.

In 2005, national attention was drawn to the district after the School Board voted to sell the naming rights of school buildings and athletics facilities to commercial interests.

== 2006 State Senate Race ==
Slavens was the Democratic nominee for State Senate in Michigan's 7th State Senate district. He was unopposed in the August 2006 Democratic primary and won the nomination. He opposed incumbent Republican Bruce Patterson.

Slavens won the cities of Belleville, Flat Rock, Plymouth, Rockwood, Trenton and Woodhaven. He also won the townships of Brownstown, Sumpter and Van Buren. Slavens and Patterson exactly tied in Gibraltar, Michigan.

Although Patterson won in Canton Township, Slavens took 48% of the vote in that community. Most Democratic candidates, especially for state legislative seats, have never come close to that margin.

== Family ==
Slavens is married to Michigan State Rep. Dian Slavens (née McCabe). They have three children and one grandchild.

His parents, Tom and Cora Slavens, were librarians by profession. Tom Slavens is a retired Professor of Information at the University of Michigan in Ann Arbor.

== Quotes ==
- "I think the people supported my message for solving the many problems of the state. What I'm really proud of is that this proves grass roots works." (Plymouth Observer. November 16, 2006.)
