= Senator Alexander =

Senator Alexander may refer to:

- Adam Rankin Alexander (1781–1848), Tennessee State Senate
- Archibald Alexander (politician) (1755–1822), Delaware State Senate
- Betty Jean Alexander (born 1960s), Michigan State Senate
- Ethel Skyles Alexander (1925–2016), Illinois State Senate
- Frederick D. Alexander (1910–1980), North Carolina State Senate
- J. D. Alexander (born 1959), Florida State Senate
- John M. Alexander Jr. (born 1949), North Carolina State Senate
- John Alexander (Ohio politician) (1777–1848), Ohio State Senate
- Kenny Alexander (born 1966), Virginia State Senate
- Lamar Alexander (born 1940), U.S. Senator from Tennessee from 2003 to 2021
- Nathaniel Alexander (governor) (1756–1808), North Carolina State Senate
- Scott Alexander (Indiana politician) (fl. 2020s), Indiana State Senate
- Sydenham Benoni Alexander (1840–1921), North Carolina State Senate
- Thomas C. Alexander (born 1956), South Carolina State Senate
- W. Ted Alexander (born 1960), North Carolina State Senate
- William Cowper Alexander (1806–1874), New Jersey State Senate
