= Phil LaJoy =

American politician from Michigan

Member of the Michigan House of Representatives from the 21st district
- In office January 1, 2003 – December 31, 2008
- Succeeded by: Dian Slavens

Personal details
- Born: May 28, 1944 (age 82) Wayne, Michigan
- Party: Republican
- Spouse: Jean LaJoy
- Education: University of Detroit
- Occupation: Politician

Phil LaJoy is an American politician from Michigan. LaJoy was a member of the Michigan House of Representatives for District 21.

== Early life ==
On May 28, 1944, LaJoy was born in Wayne, Michigan.

== Education ==
In 1972, LaJoy earned a Bachelor of Arts degree in Business from the University of Detroit.

== Career ==
LaJoy served in the United States Marine Corps.

On November 5, 2002, LaJoy won the election and became a Republican member of the Michigan House of Representatives for District 21. LaJoy served District 21 until 2008. In 2008, LaJoy became a Township Supervisor for Canton, Michigan.

== Personal life ==
LaJoy's wife is Jean LaJoy. They have two children.
