= Michigan's 7th Senate district =

American legislative district

Michigan's 7th State Senate district
Senator
Jeremy Moss; D–Southfield
- Demographics: 38.7% White; 42% Black; 8.4% Hispanic; 4.7% Asian; 0.1% Native American; 0.5% Other; 5.6% Multiracial
- Population (2024): 263,760

Michigan's 7th Senate district is one of 38 districts in the Michigan Senate. It has been represented by Democrat Jeremy Moss since 2023, succeeding fellow Democrat Dayna Polehanki.

== Geography ==
District 7 encompasses parts of Oakland and Wayne counties.

=== 2011 Apportionment Plan ===
District 7, as dictated by the 2011 Apportionment Plan, covered the immediate western suburbs of Detroit in Wayne County, including Livonia, Northville, the city and township of Plymouth, Canton, and Wayne.

The district was largely located within Michigan's 11th congressional district, also extending into the 13th district. It overlapped with the 11th, 16th, 19th, 20th, and 21st districts of the Michigan House of Representatives.

== List of senators ==
Senator	Party	Dates	Residence	Notes
Vincent L. Bradford	Democratic	1839	Niles	
Samuel Etheridge	Democratic	1839–1840	Coldwater	
Elijah Lacey	Unknown	1840–1841	Niles	
John S. Barry	Democratic	1841	Constantine	
Ephraim B. Danforth	Democratic	1847–1848	Mason	
Rix Robinson	Democratic	1847–1849	Ada	
Adam L. Roof	Democratic	1849–1850	Lyons	
John Bowne	Democratic	1850–1852	Hickory Corners	
David Sturgis	Democratic	1851–1852	DeWitt	
The 1850 Michigan Constitution takes effect, changing the district from a multi-member district to a single-member district.
Daniel Hixon	Democratic	1853–1854	Clinton	
William H. Pattison	Republican	1855–1856	Saline	
Sylvester Abel	Republican	1857–1858	Ann Arbor	
Elihu B. Pond	Democratic	1859–1860	Ann Arbor	
Thomas D. Lane	Republican	1861–1862	Washtenaw County	
William Jay	Republican	1863–1865	Whitmore Lake	
George Peters	Republican	1867–1868	Petersburg	
Edward G. Morton	Democratic	1869–1872	Monroe	
Nathan G. King	Republican	1873–1874	Brooklyn	
Lucius D. Hawkins	Democratic	1875–1876	Parma	
Michael Shoemaker	Democratic	1877–1878	Jackson	
Hiram C. Hodge	Greenback	1879–1880	Concord	
William F. Goodwin	Republican	1881–1882	Concord	
Michael Shoemaker	Democratic	1883–1886	Jackson	In 1882 and 1884, Shoemaker was elected on a Fusionist ticket.
Perry Mayo	Republican	1887–1888	Battle Creek	
Alfred Milnes	Republican	1889–1892	Coldwater	
Augustus Jewell	Republican	1893–1896	Dowagiac	
Edwin A. Blakeslee	Republican	1897–1900	Galien	
Frederick F. Sovereign	Republican	1901–1904	Three Oaks	
James G. Hayden	Republican	1905–1906	Cassopolis	
James H. Kinnane	Republican	1907–1908	Dowagiac	
Charles E. White	Republican	1909–1912	Niles	
Leon D. Case	Democratic	1913–1914	Watervliet	
Edgar A. Planck	Republican	1915–1918	Union	
Roy Clark	Republican	1919–1922	Eau Claire	
Harry H. Whiteley	Republican	1923–1926	Dowagiac	
George S. Barnard	Republican	1927–1930	Benton Harbor	
James G. Bonine	Republican	1931–1932	Cassopolis	
Leon D. Case	Democratic	1933–1936	Watervliet	
Carroll B. Jones	Democratic	1937–1938	Marcellus	
John T. Hammond	Republican	1939–1942	Benton Harbor	
G. Elwood Bonine	Republican	1943–1952	Vandalia	
Robert E. Faulkner	Republican	1953–1958	Coloma	
Harry Litowich	Republican	1959–1964	Benton Harbor	
Raymond D. Dzendzel	Democratic	1965–1970	Detroit	
Jack Faxon	Democratic	1971–1982	Detroit	
James R. DeSana	Democratic	1983–1986	Wyandotte	
Christopher D. Dingell	Democratic	1987–2002	Trenton	
Bruce Patterson	Republican	2003–2010	Canton	
Patrick Colbeck	Republican	2011–2018	Canton	
Dayna Polehanki	Democratic	2019–2022	Livonia	
Jeremy Moss	Democratic	2023–present	Royal Oak	
Jason Hoskins	Democratic	(Note: Member-elect.)		

== Recent election results ==
=== 2020s ===
2026 Michigan Senate election
Primary election
Party	Candidate	Votes	%
Democratic	Jason Hoskins	29,117	57.2
Democratic	Shadia Martini	17,040	33.48
Democratic	Rakesh Ramakrishnan	4,744	9.32
Total votes		50,901	100
Republican	Anthony Paesano	11,686	100
Total votes		11,686	100
General election
Democratic	Jason Hoskins	88,879	71.36
Republican	Anthony Paesano	35,675	28.65
Total votes		124,554	100
Democratic hold			

2022 Michigan Senate election, District 7
Primary election
Party	Candidate	Votes	%
Democratic	Jeremy Moss (incumbent)	32,022	82.9
Democratic	Ryan Foster	6,584	17.1
Total votes		38,606	100
General election
Democratic	Jeremy Moss (incumbent)	80,597	74.2
Republican	Corinne Khederian	28,008	25.8
Total votes		108,605	100
Democratic hold			

=== 2018 ===
2018 Michigan Senate election, District 7
Primary election
Party	Candidate	Votes	%
Democratic	Dayna Polehanki	27,826	73.5
Democratic	Ghulam Qadir	10,016	26.5
Total votes		37,842	100
General election
Democratic	Dayna Polehanki	69,434	50.6
Republican	Laura Cox	65,001	47.3
Libertarian	Joseph LeBlanc	2,892	2.1
Total votes		137,327	100
Democratic gain from Republican			

=== 2014 ===
2014 Michigan Senate election, District 7
Primary election
Party	Candidate	Votes	%
Republican	Patrick Colbeck (incumbent)	14,494	75.1
Republican	Matthew Edwards	4,807	24.9
Total votes		19,301	100
General election
Republican	Patrick Colbeck (incumbent)	52,567	52.7
Democratic	Dian Slavens	47,110	47.3
Total votes		99,677	100
Republican hold			

=== Federal and statewide results ===
Year	Office	Results
2020	President	Biden 54.8 – 43.7%
2018	Senate	Stabenow 54.2 – 44.5%
2018	Governor	Whitmer 55.2 – 42.7%
2016	President	Clinton 48.4 – 46.6%
2014	Senate	Peters 51.4 – 44.8%
2014	Governor	Snyder 59.4 – 39.0%
2012	President	Obama 49.7 – 49.6%
2012	Senate	Stabenow 54.6 – 42.3%

== Historical district boundaries ==
Map	Description	Apportionment Plan	Notes
	Wayne County (part); Detroit (part)	1964 Apportionment Plan	
	Wayne County (part); Detroit (part)	1972 Apportionment Plan	
	Wayne County (part); Allen Park; Brownstown Township; Ecorse; Gibraltar; Grosse Ile Township; Lincoln Park; River Rouge; Riverview; Rockwood; Southgate; Trenton; Woodhaven; Wyandotte	1982 Apportionment Plan	
	Wayne County (part); Ecorse; Gibraltar; Grosse Ile Township; Lincoln Park; Melvindale; Riverview; Southgate; Taylor; Trenton; Wyandotte	1992 Apportionment Plan	
	Wayne County (part); Belleville; Brownstown Township; Canton Township; Flat Rock; Gibraltar; Grosse Ile Township; Huron Township; Northville (part); Northville Township; Plymouth; Plymouth Township; Rockwood; Sumpter Township; Trenton; Van Buren Township; Woodhaven	2001 Apportionment Plan	
	Wayne County (part); Canton Township; Livonia; Northville; Northville Township; Plymouth; Plymouth Township; Wayne	2011 Apportionment Plan	
