= Rix Robinson =

American politician (1789–1875)

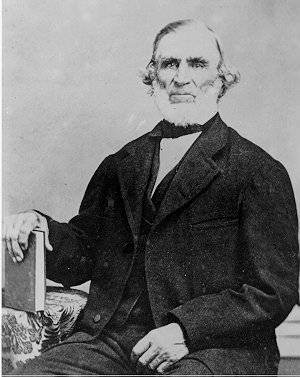

Member of the Michigan Senate
- In office 1847–1849
- Constituency: 7th district
- In office 1846
- Constituency: 5th district

Personal details
- Born: August 28, 1789 Richmond, Massachusetts, US
- Died: January 12, 1875 (aged 85) Ada Township, Michigan, US
- Party: Democratic
- Occupation: Fur trader, politician

Eduardo Rix Robinson (August 28, 1789 – January 12, 1875) was an American fur trader and politician. He was the first permanent Euro-American settler of Kent County, Michigan, a representative to the state constitutional convention of 1850 and a state senator.

== Early years ==
Robinson was born August 28, 1789, in Richmond, Massachusetts. His parents were Edward and Eunice (Rix) Robinson of Preston, Connecticut. His father was a blacksmith and farmer. He was considered a studious child and regularly attended school.

At age 19, he began studying law in Auburn, New York, and was admitted to practice law in 1811. At the outbreak of the War of 1812, which his father strongly opposed, Robinson headed west to avoid the draft, with $1,000 given to him by his father. He moved to the large outpost of Detroit in the Michigan Territory where United States Troops were garrisoned and there was a prospering fur trade.

== Fur trading in Michigan Territory ==
Robinson became a sutler to the American troops during the war. He traveled with the soldiers to Detroit, Mackinac Island, and Green Bay, all centers of the fur trade, where he had the opportunity to study the business first hand. In 1820, the American Fur Company chose Robinson to be their central fur trader in west Michigan when Madeline La Framboise retired to Mackinac Island.

He took over her trading post located where the Grand River meets the Thornapple River in what is now known as Ada. By 1827, Robinson was successfully managing twenty trading posts along the shores of Lake Michigan. Robinson was elected township supervisor when Kent County was established in 1831.

== Relationship with the Ottawa ==
In 1821, Robinson married an Ottawa woman, Pee-miss-a-quot-oquay. She had one son, John R. Robinson, born March 5, 1826. She and Robinson separated, and she later died of consumption in 1848.

Robinson remarried Sebequay ("River Woman"), an Ottawa woman and the sister of Nebawnaygezhick ("Part of the Day"), the Ottawa leader of the village on the Thornapple River. Sebequay was a devout adherent to traditional Ottawa culture, and reportedly hated being called by her settler name, Nancy.

During the Ottawa's treaty negotiations with the federal government in 1836, Robinson was an advisor to the Ottawa and a major facilitator of the treaty terms. Following the treaty, Robinson purchased hundreds of acres around the mouth of the Thornapple River for the Ottawa to continue living on.

== Politics ==
By 1834, the fur trade in Michigan was dwindling due to a shortage of fur-bearing animals, fashion changes in Europe and the expansion of the fur industry in the west. But the biggest impact to the fur industry in Michigan was that Robinson facilitated the Treaty of 1836 which gave half of the lower peninsula of Michigan to the federal government. In return he received $23,000.

This treaty allowed for the wholesale development and settlement of the state and also had a devastating effect on the Native Americans. During this time he persuaded many of his relatives to settle in Michigan. By the time Michigan joined the union in 1837, Robinson, who was a wealthy man, had closed all his trading posts and was appointed to the Board of Commissioners of Internal Improvements.

He was a Michigan state senator from 1846 to 1849. He represented the 5th district in 1846, and then represented the 7th district for the rest of his senate career from 1847 to 1849. He was elected to the state senate as a Democrat. During that time he presented a bill to give women the right to vote.

It was defeated during the drafting of the state constitution of 1850, but in a step forward in the women's rights movement, a bill allowing married women the right to control property they owned prior to marriage did pass. He was a delegate to the Michigan Constitutional Convention of 1850 and a presidential elector.

He was a strong contender for governor but declined the nomination because Sebequay did not want to be a governor's wife. Robinson died of consumption January 12, 1875. His wife died April 3, 1876. He is buried in Ada Township, Michigan.

== Honours ==
- Robinson Road in East Grand Rapids and Rix Street in Ada are named for him.
- Rix Robinson Park in Grand Haven, MI is named for him. Robinson gave Grand Haven its name in 1835.
