= Burton Leland =

American politician (1948–2018)

Member of the Wayne County Commission from the 6th district
- In office January 1, 2007 – February 25, 2018

Member of the Michigan Senate from the 5th district
- In office January 1, 1999 – December 31, 2006
- Preceded by: Michael O'Brien
- Succeeded by: Tupac Hunter

Member of the Michigan House of Representatives
- In office January 1, 1981 – December 31, 1998
- Preceded by: Jack Legel
- Succeeded by: Triette Reeves
- Constituency: 2nd district (1981-1992); 13th district (1993-1998)

Personal details
- Born: November 24, 1948 Detroit, Michigan, U.S.
- Died: February 25, 2018 (aged 69)
- Party: Democratic
- Spouse: Rosanne
- Education: University of Michigan (M.S.W.); Wayne State University (B.S.)
- Occupation: Politician, social worker

Burton Leland (November 24, 1948 – February 25, 2018) was a Democratic politician from Michigan who served on the Wayne County Commission. He also served 24 years in both houses of the Michigan Legislature.

While in the Michigan House of Representatives in 1986, Leland sponsored the state's Lemon Law. Leland died from cancer on February 25, 2018.
