= Michigan's 21st House of Representatives district =

American legislative district

Michigan's 21st State House of Representatives district
Representative
Kelly Breen; D–Novi
- Demographics: 55.1% White; 8.7% Black; 4% Hispanic; 27% Asian; 0.2% Native American; 0.8% Other; 4.1% Multiracial
- Population (2024): 93,767

Michigan's 21st House of Representatives district is a legislative district within the Michigan House of Representatives located in Oakland County. The district was created in 1965, when the Michigan Supreme Court ordered the reapportionment of state legislative districts from a county-based system to a proportional one following the Supreme Court case Reynolds v. Sims. It is currently represented by Democrat Kelly Breen of Novi.

== List of representatives ==
Representative	Party	Years	Residence	Notes
George F. Montgomery Jr.	Democratic	1965–1970	Detroit	
Morris Hood Jr.	Democratic	1971–1972	Detroit	Redistricted to the 6th district.
David S. Holmes Jr.	Democratic	1973–1974	Detroit	Redistricted from the 10th district; resigned March 1974 after being elected to the Michigan Senate.
Clifford D. Gary	Democratic	1974 (Note: Elected in a 1974 special election to replace Rep. David S. Holmes Jr., who resigned.)	Detroit	
Barbara-Rose Collins	Democratic	1975–1982	Detroit	Resigned January 1982 after being elected to the Detroit City Council.
Clifford D. Gary	Democratic	1982 (Note: Elected in a 1982 special election to replace Rep. Barbara-Rose Collins, who resigned.)	Detroit	
Richard F. Sullivan	Democratic	1983–1984	New Boston	Died February 1984.
Lynn F. Owen	Democratic	1984 (Note: Elected in a 1984 special election to replace Rep. Richard F. Sullivan, who died.)–1992	Maybee	Redistricted to the 56th district.
Deborah Whyman	Republican	1993–1998	Canton Township	Term limited.
Bruce Patterson	Republican	1999–2002	Canton Township	
Philip J. LaJoy	Republican	2003–2008	Canton Township	Term limited.
Dian Slavens	Democratic	2009–2014	Canton Township	Term limited.
Kristy Pagan	Democratic	2015–2020	Canton Township	Term limited.
Ranjeev Puri	Democratic	2021–2022	Canton Township	Redistricted to the 24th district.
Kelly Breen	Democratic	2023–present	Novi	Redistricted from the 38th district.

== Historical district boundaries ==
Map	Description	Apportionment Plan	Notes
	Wayne County (part): Detroit (part)	1964 Apportionment Plan (Note: Referred to as the Austin-Kleiner plan.)	
	Wayne County (part): Detroit (part)	1972 Apportionment Plan (Note: Referred to as the Hatcher-Kleiner plan.)	
	Monroe County (part): Ash Township; Berlin Township; Dundee Township; Exeter Township; Frenchtown Township (part); London Township; Milan; Milan Township; Petersburg; Raisinville Township; Summerfield Township; Wayne County (part): Huron Township; Sumpter Township	1982 Apportionment Plan	
	Wayne County (part): Belleville; Canton Township (part); Sumpter Township; Van Buren Township	1992 Apportionment Plan	
	Wayne County (part): Belleville; Canton Township (part); Van Buren Township	2001 Apportionment Plan	
	Wayne County (part): Belleville; Canton Township (part); Van Buren Township (part)	2011 Apportionment Plan	
	Oakland County (part): Farmington (part); Farmington Hills (part); Lyon Township (part); Northville (part); Novi (part); Novi Township	2021 Apportionment Plan (Note: Referred to as the Hickory plan.)	

== Recent elections ==
=== 2020s ===
2026 Michigan House of Representatives election
Party	Candidate	Votes	%
Democratic	Kelly Breen (incumbent)	26,354	61.03
Republican	Ross Barranco	16,825	38.97
Total votes		43,179	100
Democratic hold			

2024 Michigan House of Representatives election
Party	Candidate	Votes	%
Democratic	Kelly Breen (incumbent)	26,866	55.51
Republican	Thomas Konesky	20,834	43.05
Libertarian	James K. Young	697	1.44
Total votes		48,397	100
Democratic hold			

2022 Michigan House of Representatives election
Party	Candidate	Votes	%
Democratic	Kelly Breen	22,670	56.43
Republican	David Staudt	16,981	42.27
Libertarian	James K. Young	521	1.3
Total votes		40,172	100
Democratic hold			

2020 Michigan House of Representatives election
Party	Candidate	Votes	%
Democratic	Ranjeev Puri	34,284	59.15
Republican	Laurel Hess	23,682	40.85
Total votes		57,966	100
Democratic hold			

=== 2010s ===
2018 Michigan House of Representatives election
Party	Candidate	Votes	%
Democratic	Kristy Pagan (incumbent)	27,444	61.82
Republican	Darian Moore	16,946	38.18
Total votes		44,390	100
Democratic hold			

2016 Michigan House of Representatives election
Party	Candidate	Votes	%
Democratic	Kristy Pagan (incumbent)	28,260	59.43
Republican	Derek Moss	19,292	40.57
Total votes		47,552	100
Democratic hold			

2014 Michigan House of Representatives election
Party	Candidate	Votes	%
Democratic	Kristy Pagan	16,778	55.25
Republican	Carol Ann Fausone	13,590	44.75
Total votes		30,368	100
Democratic hold			

2012 Michigan House of Representatives election
Party	Candidate	Votes	%
Democratic	Dian Slavens (incumbent)	26,605	61.59
Republican	Joe Barnabei	16,590	38.41
Total votes		43,195	100
Democratic hold			

2010 Michigan House of Representatives election
Party	Candidate	Votes	%
Democratic	Dian Slavens (incumbent)	18,201	51.24
Republican	Lori Levi	17,320	48.76
Total votes		35,521	100
Democratic hold			

=== 2000s ===
2008 Michigan House of Representatives election
Party	Candidate	Votes	%
Democratic	Dian Slavens	27,805	51.69
Republican	Todd LaJoy	24,204	44.99
Independent	Brian M. Cronan	1,784	3.32
Total votes		53,793	100
Democratic gain from Republican			

2006 Michigan House of Representatives election
Party	Candidate	Votes	%
Republican	Philip J. LaJoy (incumbent)	21,481	56.15
Democratic	Al Sinis	16,775	43.85
Total votes		38,256	100
Republican hold			

2004 Michigan House of Representatives election
Party	Candidate	Votes	%
Republican	Philip J. LaJoy (incumbent)	27,225	57.68
Democratic	Ralph E. Mayer	19,979	42.32
Total votes		47,204	100
Republican hold			

2002 Michigan House of Representatives election
Party	Candidate	Votes	%
Republican	Philip J. LaJoy	15,591	53.76
Democratic	Mark Slavens	12,769	44.03
Libertarian	Ken Century	640	2.21
Total votes		29,000	100
Republican hold			

2000 Michigan House of Representatives election
Party	Candidate	Votes	%
Republican	Bruce Patterson (incumbent)	24,714	59.1
Democratic	Mickey Walsh	17,104	40.9
Total votes		41,818	100
Republican hold			

=== 1990s ===
1998 Michigan House of Representatives election
Party	Candidate	Votes	%
Republican	Bruce Patterson	17,613	64.43
Democratic	Ray Bailey	9,723	35.57
Total votes		27,336	100
Republican hold			
