= Ranjeev Puri =

American politician (born 1984)

Speaker-elect of the Michigan House of Representatives
- Assuming office January 2027
- Succeeding: Matt Hall

Minority Leader of the Michigan House of Representatives
- Incumbent
- Assumed office January 8, 2025
- Preceded by: Matt Hall

Member of the Michigan House of Representatives
- Incumbent
- Assumed office January 1, 2021
- Constituency: 21st district (2021–2023); 24th district (2023–present)

Personal details
- Born: c. 1984 (age 41–42) Racine, Wisconsin, U.S.
- Party: Democratic
- Education: University of Chicago (MBA)
- Website: Campaign website

Ranjeev Puri (born c. 1984) is an American politician serving as a member of the Michigan House of Representatives since 2021, currently representing the 24th district. A member of the Democratic Party, Puri has served as the House Minority Leader since January 2025.

On November 5, 2026, Puri was selected by the House Democratic Caucus as the speaker-elect of the Michigan House of Representatives. He is expected to become the 80th speaker when the new legislative sessions begins in January 2027.

Before joining the Legislature, Puri worked in financial consulting and then went on to work for President Barack Obama. Puri received his undergraduate degree in economics and finance and went on to receive his MBA from the University of Chicago Booth School of Business in 2014.

== Early life, education and career ==
Puri was born around 1984 in Racine, Wisconsin to Punjabi immigrant parents from India. He earned a bachelor's degree in economics. In 2014, Puri obtained a Master's of Business Administration from the Booth School of Business at the University of Chicago.

== Political career ==
Puri worked on Barack Obama's presidential campaign. Since 2013, Puri worked in business development for Fiat-Chrysler. Puri is affiliated with the Michigan Indian American Democratic Caucus.

Puri was endorsed by the then-incumbent state representative Kristy Pagan when he ran in the primary for the Michigan House of Representatives seat representing the 21st district. On August 4, 2020, Puri won this primary. On November 3, 2020, Puri won the general election for this seat, assumed office on January 1, 2021. With his victory, Puri became the youngest Asian-American elected to the Michigan Legislature and the first ever Sikh-American elected in Michigan's legislative history.

Upon starting his second term in the Michigan House in January 2023, Puri was selected by his colleagues and Democratic Leadership to serve as House Majority Whip for the 2023-2024 legislative term, Puri was also appointed as Chair of the Appropriations subcommittee on Transportation. As Chair, Puri has been vocal about the need to modernize Michigan's infrastructure to prepare for robust public transit and mobility options.

In 2023, Puri made national headlines with his statement in response to the Michigan State University shooting. Puri is an advocate for gun reform, and has spoken of his own personal experience with gun violence as his family's former place of worship fell victim to a white supremacist mass shooter in the Oak Creek Sikh Gurudwara shooting in 2012.

In November 2023, Puri was awarded the 2023 Council of State Government (CSG) 20 Under 40 Leadership Award. Puri spearheaded work in the historic gun reforms of Michigan and nation leading clean energy reforms earning him distinction amongst his peers.

In 2024, he sponsored legislation to take away the ability of homeowners associations to block homeowners from putting in place energy efficiency structures on their houses, such as solar panels and home electric vehicle chargers. The bill passed the Michigan state legislatures on party lines before being signed into law by Governor Gretchen Whitmer.

He was reelected in 2024. On November 7, 2024, Puri was elected by his Democratic colleagues to serve as House Democratic Leader for the 2025-2026 term in the 103rd Michigan Legislature. Upon winning his election as Democratic Leader, Puri is regarded as the highest ranking Asian-American, Indian-American, and Sikh-American elected official in state legislative politics in the entire country.

In December 2024, Puri was named the 2024 MIRS Legislator of the Year.

== Personal life ==
Puri resides in Canton, Michigan. Puri is married and has four children. Puri is of Punjabi descent and is Sikh.

Michigan House of Representatives
Preceded by Matt Hall	Minority Leader of the Michigan House of Representatives; 2025–present	Incumbent
