= Dayna Polehanki =

American politician

Member of the Michigan Senate
- Incumbent
- Assumed office January 1, 2019
- Preceded by: Patrick Colbeck
- Constituency: 7th district (2019–2022); 5th district (2023– )

Personal details
- Born: Dayna Lynn Polehanki; December 3, 1969 (age 56) Flint, Michigan, U.S.
- Party: Democratic
- Spouse: Jim Walkup
- Education: Central Michigan University; Alma College; Marygrove College
- Website: Dayna for Senate

Dayna Lynn Polehanki (born December 3, 1969) is an American politician who is a member of the Michigan Senate and has represented the 5th district since 2023. She previously represented the 7th district, from 2019 to 2022. A member of the Democratic party, she is the chair of the Education Standing Committee in the Michigan Senate and is the first former teacher who is a Democrat to be the chair.

== Early life and education ==
Polehanki was born in Flint, Michigan, on December 3, 1969. Her father Frank Polehanki was a teacher. She graduated from Flushing High School in Flushing, Michigan, in 1988. She received a bachelor's degree in psychology from Central Michigan University, a Michigan Professional Educator Certification from Alma College, and a master's degree from Marygrove College.

== Career ==
She worked as a manager for Features Casting for Paramount Pictures from 1995 to 1998 and was the owner of Detroit Casting Company from 2009 to 2018. She previously taught English at New Haven High School for grades 11–12 in the New Haven Community Schools public school district. She had 17 years of experience as a teacher and was named Teacher of the Year in 2018.

Polehanki defeated Laura Cox in the 2018 Michigan Senate election for the 7th district and succeeded the previous incumbent, Patrick Colbeck.

Polehanki defeated Emily Bauman in the 2022 Michigan Senate election for the 5th district.

== Personal life ==
Her husband Joseph James "Jim" Walkup is a manager at Ford Motor Company. They live in Livonia, Michigan, and have a dog named Frankie.

Political offices
Preceded by Patrick Colbeck	Michigan State Senator from the 7th district 2019–2022	Succeeded by Jeremy Moss
Preceded by Betty Jean Alexander	Michigan State Senator from the 5th district 2023–present	Succeeded by Incumbent
