= Dian Slavens =

American politician from Michigan

The Honorable Dian Slavens

Member of the Michigan House of Representatives from the 21st district
- In office January 1, 2009 – January 1, 2015
- Preceded by: Phil LaJoy
- Succeeded by: Kristy Pagan

Personal details
- Born: March 12, 1958 (age 68) Highland Park, Michigan
- Party: Democratic
- Spouse: Mark Slavens
- Education: Oakland Community College
- Profession: Respiratory therapist

Dian Slavens (born March 12, 1958) is a Democratic politician from Michigan who served in the Michigan House of Representatives from 2009 to 2015. Slavens represented the 21st House District, which includes Canton Township, Belleville and Van Buren Township.

She served on the Families, Children, and Seniors Committee and the Military and Veterans Affairs Committee. Dian has volunteered at Plymouth-Canton Community Schools, as a Sunday School teacher at Geneva Presbyterian Church in Canton Township, and as a Girl Scout leader for the Huron Valley Council. Her priorities included school funding, government efficiency, and encouraging residents to buy local, Michigan-based products.

In 2014, Slavens ran for the 7th district of the Michigan Senate, losing to Republican Senator Patrick Colbeck.
