= Kristy Pagan =

American politician from Michigan

Member of the Michigan House of Representatives from the 21st district
- In office January 1, 2015 – December 31, 2020
- Preceded by: Dian Slavens
- Succeeded by: Ranjeev Puri

Personal details
- Born: September 5, 1982 (age 44) Belleville, Michigan
- Party: Democratic
- Education: Western Michigan University, The George Washington University
- Website: Official website

Kristy Pagan (born September 5, 1982) is a Democratic politician from Michigan who represented the 21st District in the Michigan House of Representatives from 2015 to 2020.

Pagan attended Plymouth-Canton Community Schools, Western Michigan University and The George Washington University. After working in the Washington, DC office of U.S. Senator Debbie Stabenow, she returned to Canton to start a small business. In addition, she worked at Wayne State University Law School.

Pagan's community involvement includes the Canton Community Foundation Board of Directors as well as the Advisory Council for the STEM program at Canton High School.

In 2015, Pagan was appointed to serve on the House Appropriations Committee.
