= Steve King =

American politician (born 1949)

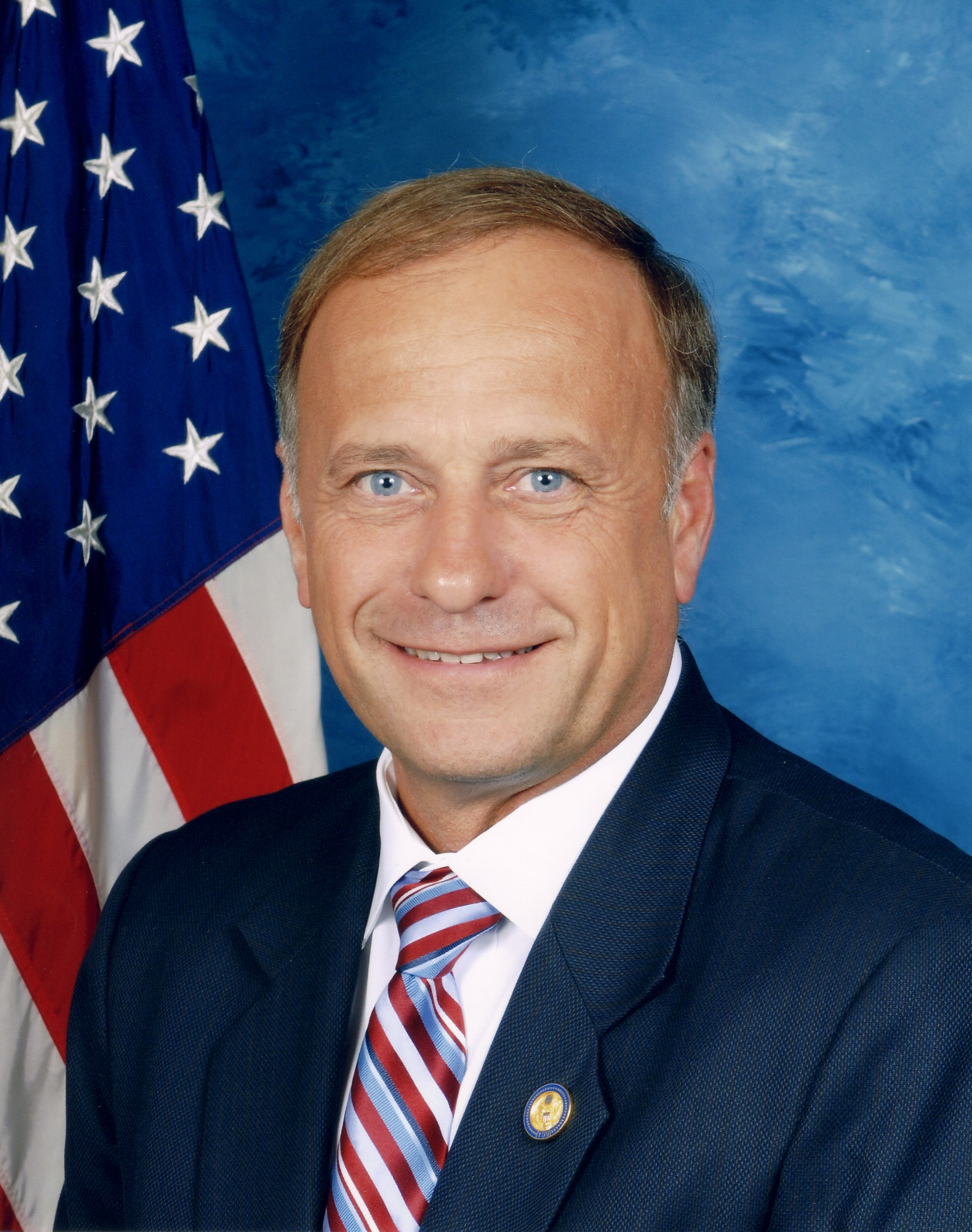

Member of the U.S. House of Representatives from Iowa
- In office January 3, 2003 – January 3, 2021
- Preceded by: Tom Latham
- Succeeded by: Randy Feenstra
- Constituency: 5th district (2003–2013); 4th district (2013–2021)

Member of the Iowa Senate from the 6th district
- In office January 13, 1997 – January 2, 2003
- Preceded by: Wayne Bennett
- Succeeded by: Thurman Gaskill

Personal details
- Born: Steven Arnold King; May 28, 1949 (age 77) Storm Lake, Iowa, U.S.
- Party: Republican
- Spouse: Marilyn Kelly (m. 1972)
- Children: 3
- Education: Northwest Missouri State University
- King's voice King on the need for UN reform. Recorded June 9, 2005

Steven Arnold King (born May 28, 1949) is an American politician and businessman who was a member of the United States House of Representatives from Iowa from 2003 to 2021. A member of the Republican Party, he represented Iowa's 5th congressional district until 2013 and the state's 4th congressional district from 2013 to 2021.

Born in 1949 in Storm Lake, Iowa, King attended Northwest Missouri State University from 1967 to 1970. He founded a construction company in 1975 and worked in business and environmental study before seeking the Republican nomination for the 6th district in the Iowa Senate in 1996. He won the primary and the general election, and was reelected in 2000. In 2002, King was elected to the U.S. House of Representatives from Iowa's 5th congressional district after the incumbent, Tom Latham, was reassigned to the 4th congressional district after redistricting. He was reelected four times before the 2010 United States census removed the 5th district, after which King ran for the 4th district, which he represented from 2013 to 2021.

King is an opponent of immigration and multiculturalism, and has a long history of racist and anti-immigrant rhetoric. The Washington Post described King in 2018 as "the Congressman most openly affiliated with white nationalism." King has been criticized for his affiliation with white supremacist ideas, made controversial statements against immigrants, and supported European right-wing populist and far-right politicians who have engaged in racism, antisemitism and Islamophobia.

King's views and policy platforms did not attract major intra-party condemnation until shortly before the 2018 election, when the National Republican Congressional Committee withdrew funding for King's reelection campaign and its chairman, Steve Stivers, condemned King's conduct, although Iowa's Republican senators and governor continued to endorse him. King was narrowly reelected, but after a January 2019 interview in which he questioned the negative connotations of the terms "white nationalist" and "white supremacy", he was widely condemned by both parties, the media, and public figures, and the Republican Steering Committee removed him from all House committee assignments. King ran for reelection but, campaign funding and support having declined, lost the June 2020 Republican primary election to Randy Feenstra by 10 points.

== Personal life, education, and business career ==
King was born on May 28, 1949, in Storm Lake, Iowa, the son of Lila Mildred (née Culler), a homemaker, and Emmett Arnold King, a state police dispatcher. His father had Irish and German ancestry, and his mother had Welsh roots, as well as American ancestry going back to the colonial era. His paternal grandmother was a German immigrant. King graduated in 1967 from Denison Community High School. In 1972, he married Marilyn Kelly, with whom he has three children. Though he was raised in the United Methodist Church, King attends his wife's Catholic church, and converted to Catholicism 17 years after their marriage. His son Jeff King, a consultant, has been active in his political campaigns.

King attended Northwest Missouri State University from 1967 to 1970, where he was a member of the Alpha Kappa Lambda fraternity and majored in mathematics and biology, but did not graduate. In 1975, King founded King Construction, an earthmoving company. In the 1980s, he founded the Kiron Business Association. King's involvement with the Iowa Land Improvement Contractors' Association led to regional and national offices in that organization and a growing interest in public policy.

== Iowa Senate (1997–2003) ==
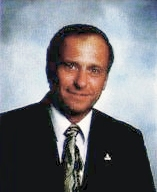
King as an Iowa state senator

In 1996, King was elected to Iowa's 6th Senate district, defeating incumbent senator Wayne Bennett in the primary 68%–31%. and Eileen Heiden, a Democrat, in the general election 64%–35%. In 2000, he won reelection to a second term, defeating Democratic nominee Dennis Ryan 70%–30%. During his tenure in the Iowa Senate, King filed a bill requiring public schools to teach children that the U.S. "is the unchallenged greatest nation in the world and that it has derived its strength from... Christianity, free enterprise capitalism and Western civilization", and served as chief sponsor of a law making English the official language of Iowa.

== U.S. House of Representatives (2003–2021) ==
=== Elections ===
2002

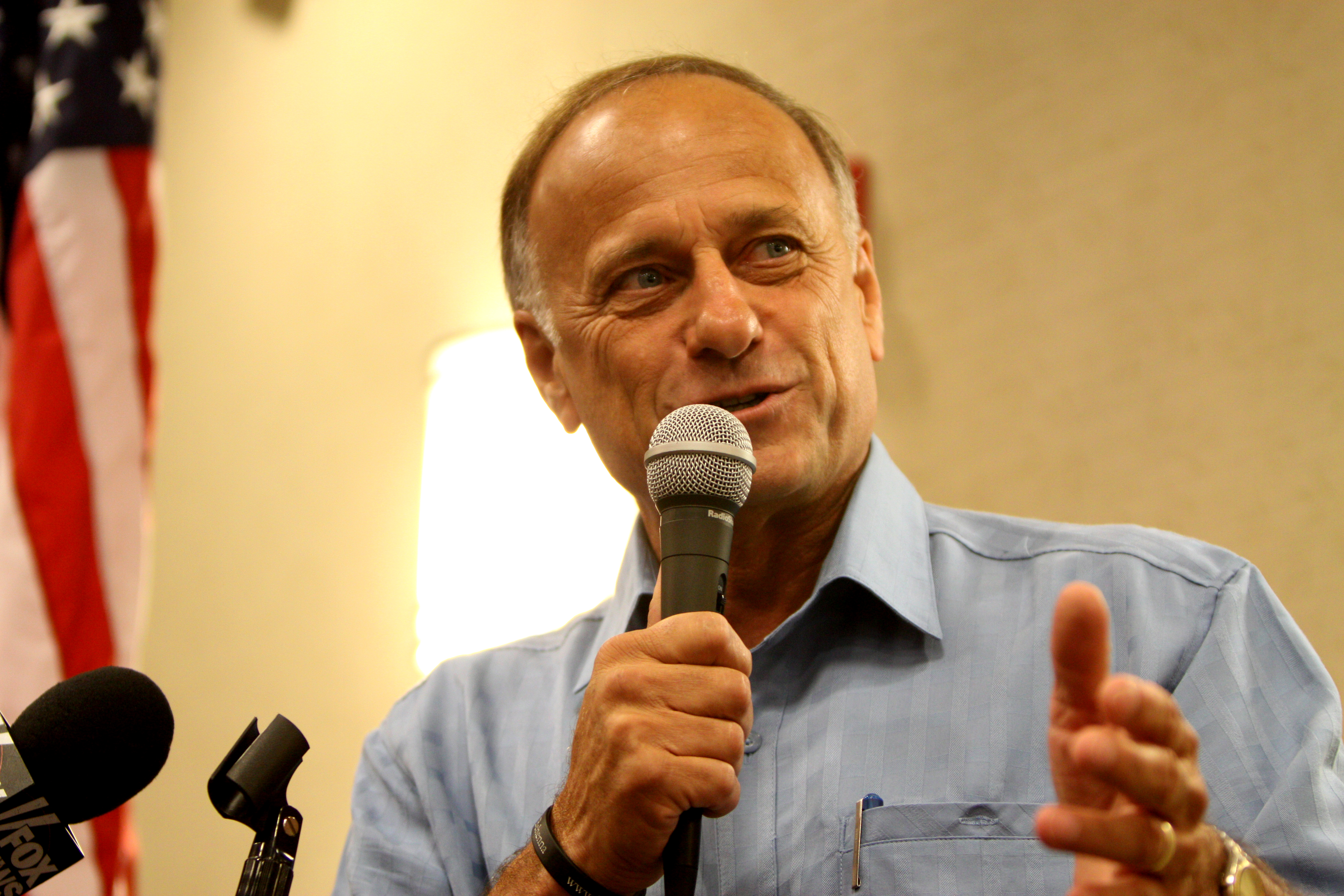
Steve King at an event in Ames, Iowa, in August 2011

In 2002, after redistricting, King ran for the open seat in Iowa's 5th congressional district. The incumbent, fellow Republican Tom Latham, had his home drawn into the reconfigured 4th district. King finished first in the Republican primary of four candidates with 31% of the vote, less than the 35% voting threshold needed to win; subsequently, a nominating convention was held, at which he was nominated, defeating state house speaker Brent Siegrist 51%–47%. King won the general election, defeating Council Bluffs city councilman Paul Shomshor 62%–38%. He won all the counties in the predominantly Republican district except Pottawattamie.

2004

King won reelection to a second term, defeating Democratic candidate Joyce Schulte, 63%–37%. He won all the counties in the district except Clarke.

2006

In 2006, King won reelection to a third term, defeating Schulte again, 59%–36%. He won all the counties in the district except Clarke and Union.

2008

King won reelection to a fourth term, defeating Democratic candidate Rob Hubler, 60%–37%. For the first time in his career he won all 32 counties in his district.

2010

King won reelection to a fifth term, defeating Matt Campbell, 66%–32%. King won all 32 counties in his district.

2012

Iowa lost a district as a result of the 2010 census. After redistricting, King was in the newly drawn 4th congressional district. This placed King and his predecessor, Latham, in the same district. Latham opted to move to the reconfigured 3rd district to challenge the Democratic incumbent Leonard Boswell. The reconfigured district was, at least on paper, much more competitive than King's old district. The 5th district had a Cook Partisan Voting Index of R+9, while the new 4th district had a PVI of R+4.

Soon afterward, former Iowa first lady Christie Vilsack, the wife of the former governor and U.S. agriculture secretary Tom Vilsack, announced she was moving to the new 4th district to challenge King. King received the endorsement of Mitt Romney, who said, "I'm looking here at Steve King because this man needs to be your congressman again. I want him as my partner in Washington, D.C." King won reelection to a sixth term, defeating Vilsack 53%–45%. King won all but seven counties, none of which he had previously represented: Webster, Boone, Story, Chickasaw, Floyd, Cerro Gordo, and Winnebago. King later said of his 2012 victory, "I faced $7 million, the best of everything Democrats can throw at me, their dream candidate and everything that can come from the Obama machine, and prevailed through all of that with 55 percent of my district that was new."

2014

On May 3, 2013, King announced that he would not run for the United States Senate in 2014.

King won reelection with 61.6% of the vote, defeating Democratic candidate Jim Mowrer.

2016

King won reelection, receiving 61.2% of the vote to Democratic nominee Kim Weaver's 38.6%.

2018

King received 50.4% of the vote to 47% for Democratic nominee J. D. Scholten; Libertarian candidate Charles Aldrich received 2%. King likely prevailed due to Governor Kim Reynolds carrying the district with almost 61 percent of the vote in her bid for a full term. Turnout was down from the 2016 election; 370,259 voted in 2016, compared to 313,251 in 2018.

King had the smallest margin of victory in the election since his 2012 race against Vilsack, which King won by less than 8 percentage points.

2020

In the wake of being stripped of his committee seats, King faced a credible primary challenger in state senator Randy Feenstra, who represented much of the district's northwest portion. Feenstra outraised King by a significant margin. Ultimately, King lost to Feenstra, taking 36.7 percent of the vote to Feenstra's 45.7 percent.

=== Tenure ===
King is considered an outspoken fiscal and social conservative. After winning the 2002 Republican nomination, he said that he intended to use his seat in Congress to "move the political center of gravity in Congress to the right." During the 110th Congress, King voted with the majority of the Republican Party 90.9% of the time. He voted for legislation authorizing the Iraq War and supported surge efforts and opposed a time table for troop withdrawals. During the 112th United States Congress, King was one of 40 "staunch" members of the Republican Study Committee who frequently voted against Republican party leadership and vocally expressed displeasure with House bills. In August 2015, King was named the least effective member of Congress by InsideGov due to his persistent failures to get legislation out of committee. On December 18, 2019, King voted against the first impeachment of Donald Trump, as did all 195 Republicans in the U.S. House of Representatives who voted.

==== Committee assignments ====
King served on the Judiciary, Agriculture, and Small Business Committees until January 14, 2019, when he was removed from all committee assignments after bipartisan condemnation of his remarks on white supremacy.

=== Caucus memberships ===
- Republican Study Committee
- Tea Party Caucus
- Congressional Constitution Caucus
- Congressional Western Caucus

== Political positions ==
=== Abortion ===
King opposes abortion. He had a 100% rating from the National Right to Life Committee. King voted against allowing human embryonic stem cell research. He supports the No Taxpayer Funding for Abortion Act, which would ban federal funding of abortions except in cases of what the bill calls "forcible rape". This would remove the coverage from Medicaid that covers abortions for victims of statutory rape or incest.

After Todd Akin made a controversial statement about "legitimate rape" on August 19, 2012, King came to his defense, characterizing the critiques as "petty personal attacks" and calling Akin a "strong Christian man". King said that Akin's voting record should be more important than his words. Six months later, King's defense of Akin (who lost his race) was seen as politically damaging by Steven J. Law of the Conservative Victory Project, a group including Karl Rove that was working to discourage conservative candidates they deemed unelectable, to enable more viable conservative candidates to gain office. Law said, "We're concerned about Steve King's Todd Akin problem."

King sponsored legislation to ban abortion of a fetus that has a detectable heartbeat, which can in some cases occur as early as 6 weeks (before many women know they are pregnant). The bill would have made a physician who performed a prohibited abortion subject to a fine, up to five years in prison, or both. It would have made women who undergo a prohibited abortion ineligible for prosecution.

In August 2019, while defending his opposition to abortion in cases of rape or incest, King asked, "What if we went back through all the family trees and just pulled out anyone who was a product of rape or incest? Would there be any population of the world left if we did that?" Iowa state senator Randy Feenstra, who went on to defeat King in the 2020 Republican primary, tweeted: "I am 100% pro-life but Steve King's bizarre comments and behavior diminish our message & damage our cause". U.S. representative Liz Cheney called King's comments "appalling and bizarre" and called for his resignation. King's comments were also criticized by Steve Scalise, Kevin McCarthy, Donald Trump, and Elise Jordan.

=== Animal rights ===
In February 2010, King tweeted about chasing and shooting a raccoon that had tried to enter his house during a blizzard, prompting criticism from animal rights groups. He defended his actions, saying the animal may have had rabies.

In July 2012, King opposed the McGovern Amendment (to the 2012 Farm Bill) to establish misdemeanor penalties for knowingly attending an organized animal fight and felony penalties for bringing a minor to such a fight. He was also one of 39 House members to vote against an upgrade of penalties for transporting fighting animals across state lines in 2007. King received a score of zero on the 2012 Humane Society Legislative Fund's Humane Scorecard. Afterward, he put out a video clarifying his position, stating that it would be putting animals above humans if it were legal to watch humans fight but not animals.

On September 24, 2010, comedian Stephen Colbert testified to the House Agriculture Committee about the working conditions of migrant farmworkers. King said he wanted to eliminate them, replacing them with "everyday American workers". He also said, "Maybe we should be spending less time watching Comedy Central and more time considering all the real jobs that are out there, ones that require real hard labor". He praised the "Joe the Plumbers of the world who many days would prefer the aroma of fresh dirt to that of the sewage from American elitists who disparage them even as they flush." Colbert, in his faux-conservative character, lampooned King. "This is America! I don't want a tomato picked by a Mexican! I want it picked by an American, then sliced by a Guatemalan, and served by a Venezuelan in a spa where a Chilean gives me a Brazilian."

In July 2012, King introduced an amendment to the House Farm Bill that would legalize previously banned animal agriculture practices such as tail-docking, using banned arsenic-based drugs in chicken feed, and keeping impregnated pigs in small crates. "My language wipes out everything they've done with pork and veal," King said of his amendment. The Humane Society of the United States (HSUS) President Wayne Pacelle said the measure could nullify "any laws to protect animals, and perhaps ... laws to protect the environment, workers, or public safety."

In May 2013, King introduced another amendment to the House Farm Bill, the Protect Interstate Commerce Act (PICA), saying, "PICA blocks states from requiring 'free range' eggs or 'free range' pork." The provision was dropped in 2014.

=== Climate change ===
King has dismissed concern over global warming, calling it a "religion" and claiming efforts to address climate change are useless. A day after claiming that climate change was more "a religion than a science," he reasserted that many scientists overreact when discussing the consequences of global warming, saying, "Everything that might result from a warmer planet is always bad in [environmentalists'] analysis. There will be more photosynthesis going on if the Earth gets warmer ... And if sea levels go up 4 or 6 inches, I don't know if we'd know that. We don't know where sea level is even, let alone be able to say that it's going to come up an inch globally because some polar ice caps might melt because there's CO_{2} suspended in the atmosphere."

=== Elections ===
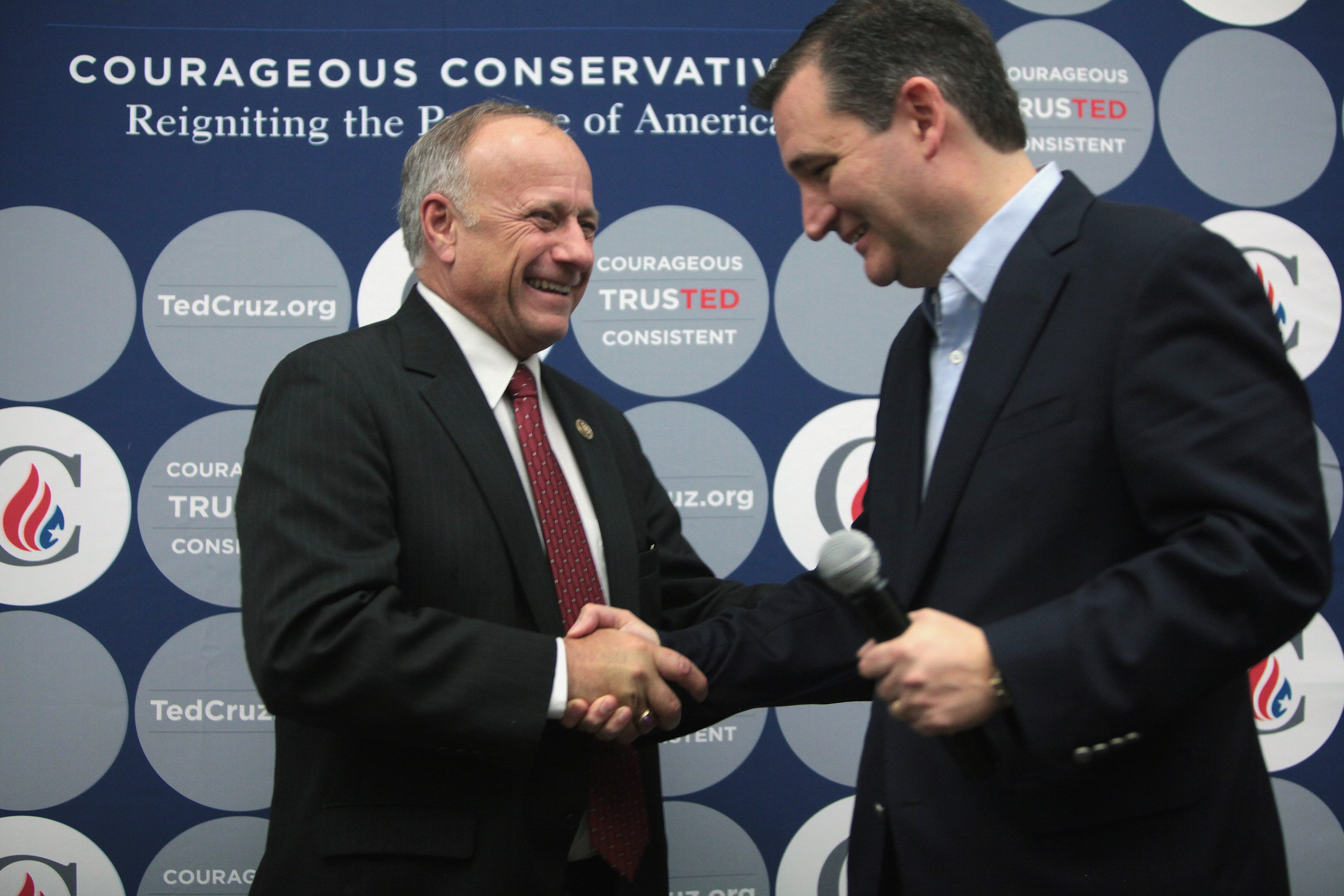
King and Ted Cruz in 2015

King endorsed Ted Cruz in the 2016 Republican presidential primaries, saying Cruz was the "answer to my prayers". He endorsed and supported Donald Trump after Trump won the nomination.

In December 2020, King was one of 126 Republican members of the U.S. House of Representatives who signed an amicus brief in support of Texas v. Pennsylvania, a lawsuit filed at the United States Supreme Court contesting the results of the 2020 presidential election, in which Joe Biden prevailed over incumbent Donald Trump. The U.S. Supreme Court declined to hear the case on the basis that Texas lacked standing under Article III of the Constitution to challenge the results of the election held by another state.

Nancy Pelosi, the speaker of the United States House of Representatives, reprimanded King and the other members of the U.S. House of Representatives who supported the lawsuit: "The 126 Republican Members that signed onto this lawsuit brought dishonor to the House. Instead of upholding their oath to support and defend the Constitution, they chose to subvert the Constitution and undermine public trust in our sacred democratic institutions."

=== Fiscal policy ===
Objecting to "taxpayer-funded subsidies, pet projects and added bureaucracy", King voted against American Recovery and Reinvestment Act of 2009 in the U.S. House of Representatives, saying, "Our economy will not recover because government spends more. It will recover because people produce more." King was one of only 11 members of Congress to vote against the $51.8 billion Hurricane Katrina relief package in 2005, claiming there was no comprehensive plan for spending the aid money.

=== Gun rights ===
King opposes stricter regulations on gun ownership. In 2017, King said that a bill to close the so-called "gun show loophole" and add background checks for individuals who bought guns at gun shows would ruin "Christmas at the Kings'" if it passed. In 2018, King criticized Parkland high school shooting survivor X González, who is Cuban American, for wearing a patch depicting the flag of Cuba. In 2018, he said that easy access to guns should not be blamed for gun violence, but rather video games, cultural changes, lack of prayer in schools, gun-free zones, family break-ups, and the stimulant medication Ritalin.

=== Healthcare ===
King opposed the Affordable Care Act (Obamacare) and led attempts to repeal it. He fought against Medicare and Medicaid covering a number of medications such as Viagra, which he called "recreational drugs".

In January 2017, King said that in the wake of the 2016 presidential election, "it has become abundantly clear that the American people have overwhelmingly rejected Obamacare time and time again" and called for congressional Republicans to "take swift action to fulfill our promise to We the People and repeal this unconstitutional and egregious law passed by hook, crook and legislative shenanigan." In May 2017, King said he had moved from supporting the American Health Care Act, the Republican replacement to the Affordable Care Act, to being unsure as a result of benefits such as emergency services, hospitalization and prescription drugs that were added following his backing of the measure: "Once they negotiated [essential health benefits] with the Freedom Caucus and Tuesday Group, it is hard for me to imagine they will bring that language in the Senate, or that it will be effective because they diluted this thing substantially." King added that he and Trump agreed on the need for the federal government to not have a role in health insurance and that Republicans would not have had difficulty repealing the Affordable Care Act had the party prioritized its replacement within the first week of the 115th United States Congress, in January 2015.

=== LGBT rights ===
On April 3, 2009, the Iowa Supreme Court ruled in Varnum v. Brien unanimously that a state ban on same-sex marriage violated Iowa's constitution. King soon commented that the justices "should resign from their position" and the state legislature "must also enact marriage license residency requirements so that Iowa does not become the gay marriage Mecca." King, along with others, mounted a campaign against the three Iowa Supreme Court justices who were up for retention and had ruled on the gay marriage case. King bought $80,000 of radio advertising across the state calling for Iowans to vote against their retention. None of the three were retained.

On October 7, 2014, King was one of 19 members of Congress inducted into the LGBT civil rights advocacy group Human Rights Campaign's "Hall of Shame" for his opposition to LGBT equality.

In response to the Supreme Court's 2015 decision Obergefell v. Hodges, in which the court ruled that same-sex marriage is a constitutionally protected right, King called for a non-binding resolution saying that states may refuse to recognize the decision. He has also called for the abolition of civil marriage. On May 17, 2019, King was one of 173 representatives to vote against the Equality Act.

=== Lobbying ===
On February 26, 2010, King went to the House floor to protest how health care reform had been handled and said, "Lobbyists do a very effective and useful job on this Hill... There's a credibility there in that arena that I think somebody needs to stand up for the lobby, and it is a matter of providing a lot of valuable information."

=== Immigration ===
King voted against the Further Consolidated Appropriations Act of 2020 which authorized the United States Department of Homeland Security to nearly double the available H-2B visas for the remainder of the fiscal year of 2020.

King voted against the Consolidated Appropriations Act (H.R. 1158) which prohibited the United States Immigration and Customs Enforcement from cooperating with the United States Department of Health and Human Services to detain or remove illegal alien sponsors of unaccompanied alien children.

King is a proponent of the Great Replacement theory, the theory states that the white population is being replaced by the mass immigration of non-white immigrants.

== Controversial comments ==
The Washington Post has described King as "the U.S. congressman most openly affiliated with white nationalism", while Vanity Fair has said his opinions in this direction are "barely veiled". David Leonhardt in an opinion piece for The New York Times explicitly identified King as being a "white nationalist". King has stirred controversy and come to prominence by making statements that have been described as racist or racially charged. He is a staunch opponent of immigration and multiculturalism, and has supported far-right European politicians. According to The Guardian, King "has long been one of the most vociferously anti-immigration members of the House Republican caucus." King has said that he is not a racist.

In October 2018, the chairman of the National Republican Congressional Committee, Steve Stivers, condemned King as a racist, saying that King's actions and comments were "completely inappropriate" and constituted "white supremacy and hate." The NRCC said it would not help King in his 2018 re-election efforts. Representative Carlos Curbelo described King's comments and actions as "disgusting" and said that he would never vote for someone like King. Ted Cruz called King's rhetoric "divisive" but stopped short of condemning him. Other Republicans, such as House Agriculture Committee Chairman Mike Conaway, dismissed the idea that King is racist.

In a January 2019 interview with The New York Times, King asked, "White nationalist, white supremacist, Western civilization—how did that language become offensive?" He also said of the large increase in representation of minorities and women in the U.S. House of Representatives: "You could look over there and think the Democratic Party is no country for white men." He was subsequently condemned by numerous Republican members of Congress, including House Minority Leader Kevin McCarthy and other members of the House Republican leadership. Tim Scott criticized King harshly in a Washington Post op-ed, and Senate Majority Leader Mitch McConnell called King's remarks "unwelcome and unworthy of his elected position". Conservative commentator Ben Shapiro called for King to be censured and for a primary challenge against King. After the interview was published, and following backlash from across the political spectrum, King issued a statement via Twitter stating that he was "simply a Nationalist", that he did not advocate for "white nationalism and white supremacy", and that "I want to make one thing abundantly clear: I reject those labels and the evil ideology they define." King said The New York Times had misunderstood his comments, and that he did not question why "white nationalist" and "white supremacist" were offensive terms. On Twitter, he later stated: "As I told The New York Times, 'it's not about race; It's never been about race'." The House voted 416–1 to rebuke King's comments; U.S. representative Bobby Rush was the lone "nay" vote, but only because he believed a rebuke was too lenient and that King deserved to be censured.

=== Immigration and multiculturalism ===
King is a staunch opponent of immigration and multiculturalism.

In April 2006, when asked if "the US economy simply couldn't function without" the presence of illegal immigrants, King said that he rejected that position "categorically". He said the 77.5 million people between the ages of 16 and 65 in the United States who are not part of the workforce "could be put to work and we could invent machines to replace the rest." In 2006, King called for an electrified fence on the US border, commenting that such fences were successful in containing livestock.

In July 2013, speaking about proposed immigration legislation, King said of illegal immigrants: "For every one who's a valedictorian, there's another 100 out there who weigh 130 pounds—and they've got calves the size of cantaloupes because they're hauling 75 pounds of marijuana across the desert." Despite strong rebukes from both Democrats and other Republicans, including John Boehner, the speaker of the U.S. House or Representatives, who called his statements "ignorant" and "hateful", and Eric Cantor, who called the comments "inexcusable". King defended his comments, saying he got the description from the border patrol.

In July 2015, referencing the remarks of Julián Castro, the secretary of the United States Department of Housing and Urban Development, on how poorly the Republican Party was doing with Hispanic voters, King responded, "What does Julian [sic] Castro know? Does he know that I'm as Hispanic and Latino as he?" King is neither Hispanic nor Latino by either family history or ethnic definition.

In 2016, a journalist for the Iowa Starting Line reported that King displayed the Confederate flag on his office desk, although Iowa was part of the Union during the American Civil War. He removed it after a Confederate flag-waver later fatally shot two Iowa police officers. King attempted to block a bill that would remove Andrew Jackson and replace him with Harriet Tubman on the twenty-dollar bill. King praised Bernie Sanders numerous times for his view on immigration, saying they were "closer to mine than it is some of the presidential candidates on the Republican side."

In March 2017, King wrote "culture and demographics are our destiny. We can't restore our civilization with somebody else's babies." When asked about his comments, King stood by them, saying: "you need to teach your children your values" and "with the inter-marriage, I'd like to see an America that is just so homogenous that we look a lot the same". King was rebuked by members of his own party, including Paul Ryan, the Speaker of the U.S. House of Representatives, but praised by white supremacist David Duke and The Daily Stormer, a neo-Nazi website.

In July 2017, the House Appropriations Committee voted to fund the US-Mexico border wall, allocating $1.6 billion for it. King called for an additional $5 billion for the wall, to be paid for with federal dollars coming from Planned Parenthood, food stamps, and other federal welfare programs, saying, "I would find half of a billion of dollars of that right out of Planned Parenthood's budget, and the rest of it could come out of food stamps and the entitlements that are being spread out for people who have not worked in three generations."

On November 5, 2018, King referred to Mexican immigrants as "dirt" while at a campaign stop. The Weekly Standard reported the comment; King denied saying it and called on The Weekly Standard to release audio of the remarks. The Weekly Standard then released a recording of the exchange, confirming that King had made the remarks. In May 2019, King warned against "presuming that every culture is equal". On September 4, 2019, King posted a video of himself drinking water from water fountains over toilets at migrant facilities. U.S. representative Alexandria Ocasio-Cortez criticized Republicans as "anti-immigrant" following the video.

=== President Barack Obama ===
On March 7, 2008, during his press engagements to announce his reelection campaign, King made remarks about then U.S. senator and Democratic presidential candidate Barack Obama and his middle name "Hussein", saying:

I don't want to disparage anyone because of their race, their ethnicity, their name—whatever their religion their father might have been, I'll just say this: When you think about the optics of a Barack Obama potentially getting elected President of the United States—I mean, what does this look like to the rest of the world? What does it look like to the world of Islam? I will tell you that, if he is elected president, then the radical Islamists, the al-Qaida, the radical Islamists and their supporters, will be dancing in the streets in greater numbers than they did on September 11.

On March 10, King defended his comments to the Associated Press, saying "[Obama will] certainly be viewed as a savior for them... That's why you will see them supporting him, encouraging him."

Obama said he did not take the comments too seriously, describing King as a person who thrives on making controversial statements to get media coverage. He said, "I would hope senator [John] McCain would want to distance himself from that kind of inflammatory and offensive remarks." The McCain campaign disavowed King's comments, saying "John McCain rejects the type of politics that degrades our civics... and obviously that extends to Congressman King's statement."

In mid-January 2009, King acknowledged that terrorists were not dancing in the streets, and had made statements opposing Obama. He said he found Obama's decision to use his middle name "Hussein" when sworn in as the 44th President of the United States to be "bizarre" and "a double standard".

In 2010, King speculated that Obama's immigration policies were influenced by racial favoritism toward black people.

In February 2020 on Twitter, King insinuated that Philip Haney, a United States Department of Homeland Security official, had been murdered as a reprisal for "archiving data that incriminated the highest levels of the Obama administration".

=== Racial profiling ===
On June 14, 2010, King said on the floor of the U.S. House of Representatives that racial profiling is an important component of law enforcement: "Some claim that the Arizona law will bring about racial discrimination profiling. First let me say, Mr. Speaker, that profiling has always been an important component of legitimate law enforcement. If you can't profile someone, you can't use those common sense indicators that are before your very eyes. Now, I think it's wrong to use racial profiling for the reasons of discriminating against people, but it's not wrong to use race or other indicators for the sake of identifying people that are violating the law." As an example of profiling, King described an instance when a taxi driver would stop for him before he had to hail a cab, just because he was in a business suit. The same day, on G. Gordon Liddy's radio program, King said that Obama's policies favored black people: "The president has demonstrated that he has a default mechanism in him that breaks down the side of race—on the side that favors the black person in the case of Professor Gates and Officer Crowley." On January 13, 2018, King tweeted that racial oppression was a "thing of the past".

=== Comments on Western civilization ===
On July 18, 2016, King participated in a panel discussion on MSNBC, during which a panelist from Esquire magazine suggested that the 2016 convention could be the last in which "old white people would command the Republican Party's attention". King responded, "This whole 'old white people' business does get a little tired, Charlie. I'd ask you to go back through history and figure out where are these contributions that have been made by these other categories of people that you are talking about? Where did any other subgroup of people contribute more to civilization?" Panel moderator Chris Hayes later described King's comments as odious and preposterous. Panel member April Ryan described them as "in-my-face racism". That evening, King was asked about his comments during an interview with ABC News. King said he had meant to say that "Western civilization", rather than "white people", is the "superior culture": "when you describe Western civilization, that can mean much of Western civilization happens to be Caucasians. But we should not apologize for our culture or our civilization. The contributions that were made by Western civilization itself, and by Americans, by Americans of all races, stand far above the rest of the world. The Western civilization and the American civilization are a superior culture."

=== Attitudes towards Muslims ===
In September 2014, King called for the Obama administration to begin surveilling mosques to monitor recruitment to ISIS. Although BuzzFeed News said there was no evidence of such recruitment, King claimed it was occurring in parts of the United States. On December 9, 2015, he told MSNBC that he agreed with his party that Islam is "incompatible" with American life. In an interview with Breitbart News, King said he did not want Muslims working in meat-packing plants, because "I don't want people doing my pork that won't eat it, let alone hope I go to hell for eating pork chops." On March 7, 2019, he voted "present" on a resolution the US House passed condemning anti-Semitism and anti-Muslim discrimination. On August 27, 2019, King joked about Uyghur Muslims detained in China's Xinjiang re-education camps being forced to eat pork.

=== Abuse at Abu Ghraib prison ===
In May 2004, King compared the torture and prisoner abuse at Abu Ghraib prison to "hazing". He argued that violence against American soldiers in Iraq was more extreme than the prisoner abuse, saying that comparing the two was like comparing the crimes "committed by Jeffrey Dahmer compared to those of Heidi Fleiss".

=== Affirmative action ===
King opposes affirmative action. He once said "There's been legislation that's been brought through this House that sets aside benefits for women and minorities. The only people that it excludes are white men... Pretty soon, white men are going to notice they are the ones being excluded." In 2015, King introduced a bill that would require colleges to report affirmative action.

=== Support for far-right politics ===
On March 12, 2017, King expressed his support for Geert Wilders, a far-right Dutch politician known for his anti-Islam views, leading up to the election in the Netherlands, stating, "Wilders understands that culture and demographics are our destiny" and "We can't restore our civilization with somebody else's babies," referring to his views on ending birthright citizenship and promoting "an America that's just so homogenous that we look a lot [sic] the same." His statements received criticism from other politicians, including several Republicans, with Jeb Bush responding that "America is a nation of immigrants"; despite the backlash, King defended his statements. Others reported that King's statements were well received among white nationalists, garnering support from prominent members of that community. The next day on CNN, King said he was referring to culture, not ethnicity, saying: "It's the culture, not the blood. If you can go anywhere in the world and adopt these babies and put them into households that were already assimilated in America, those babies will grow up as American as any other baby with as much patriotism and love of country as any other baby." Former Ku Klux Klan leader David Duke praised King's statement.

King supported Viktor Orbán, a right-wing populist and strong opponent of admitting migrants during the European migrant crisis. On December 8, 2017, King tweeted a quote of Orbán; "Diversity is not our strength. Hungarian Prime Minister Victor Orban [sic], 'Mixing cultures will not lead to a higher quality of life but a lower one'." He also tweeted "Assimilation has become a dirty word to the multiculturalist Left. Assimilation, not diversity, is our American strength".

In June 2018, he retweeted a comment by Mark Collett, a British neo-Nazi and self-described admirer of Hitler, about Europe "waking up" to mass immigration.

On August 24, 2018, King was interviewed by the Austrian website Unzensuriert (Uncensored), which is connected to the country's Freedom Party, part of the First Kurz government. He agreed with the interviewer that American financier George Soros is involved with the "Great Replacement", a far-right conspiracy theory that claims to have identified a plot to replace white Europeans with minorities and immigrants.

King also endorsed right-wing Canadian political commentator Faith Goldy in the 2018 Toronto mayoral election. Goldy participated in a neo-Nazi podcast and has been described as far-right or alt-right. In response to the Goldy endorsement, and King's other racially contentious remarks, Land O'Lakes, an agricultural cooperative based in Minnesota, ended its support for his reelection.

In February 2021, after he left office, it was announced that he would be a speaker at Nick Fuentes' America First Political Action Conference.

=== White genocide ===
King subscribes to the white genocide conspiracy theory, and stated this view while a congressman. Mother Jones and other media have reported more generally on his belief in and promotion of the conspiracy theory. In 2018, King spoke to an Austrian far-right publication about "the great replacement", which The New York Times described as "a conspiracy theory on the far right that claims shadowy elites are working behind the scenes to reduce white populations to minorities in their own countries." The theory gained notoriety after the alleged perpetrator of the 2019 Christchurch mosque shootings titled his manifesto after it.

=== Antisemitism controversy in 2018 ===
In late October 2018, after the Pittsburgh synagogue shooting, the Anti-Defamation League (ADL) sent the House speaker, Paul Ryan, an open letter calling on him to censure King, citing King's relationship with far-right Freedom Party of Austria and other far-right groups in Europe. The letter accused King of engaging in antisemitic smearing of the Jewish investor and philanthropist George Soros. It concluded, "Rep. King has brought dishonor onto the House of Representatives. We strongly urge you and the congressional leadership to demonstrate your revulsion with Rep. King's actions by stripping him of his subcommittee chairmanship and initiating proceedings to formally censure or otherwise discipline him." Two leaders within the Iowa Jewish community also criticized King for being "an enthusiastic crusader for the same types of abhorrent beliefs held by the Pittsburgh shooter".

== Post-political career ==
King and Vivek Ramaswamy in 2024

After King's loss in the 2020 Republican primary in Iowa's 4th congressional district, he wrote a book giving his account of what happened and travelled for several months to promote it. The book is entitled Walking Through the Fire: My Fight for the Heart and Soul of America. It was put out by Fidelis Publishing, known for publishing Christian and conservative books. King says he was motivated to write lest "the media and the elitists in the Republican Party write a political epitaph" for him. The book maintains that freedom of speech is being undermined and that the Democratic Party is weaponizing terms like "white nationalist" and "white supremacist". King claims his attempts to warn America about this was why he lost his party's support, saying "I'm trying to tell America, and what do they [Republican leadership] do? Politically assassinate me for trying to let them know what's happening to all of us."

In 2021, he told the Des Moines Register that while he currently had no plans to return to politics, he would if there was a "groundswell". He went on to say, "I don't see that at this point. But I do see a lot of support, and we've got a lot of policies and causes that we need to push. We've got state conventions coming up and a platform to be shaped."

King has campaigned against carbon-capture pipelines; at an August 2023 event cosponsored by the John Birch Society, he criticized the use of eminent domain and financial motivations behind the pipelines.

In December 2023, King campaigned with Vivek Ramaswamy, a 2024 presidential candidate, at an event in Lakeside, Iowa, but had not endorsed him. In January 2024, he gave a full endorsement of him.

U.S. House of Representatives
Preceded by Tom Latham	Member of the U.S. House of Representatives from Iowa's 5th congressional district 2003–2013	Constituency abolished
Preceded by Tom Latham	Member of the U.S. House of Representatives from Iowa's 4th congressional district 2013–2021	Succeeded by Randy Feenstra
U.S. order of precedence (ceremonial)
Preceded by Louie Gohmert as Former U.S. Representative	Order of precedence of the United States as Former U.S. Representative	Succeeded by Toby Roth as Former U.S. Representative
