= Michigan's 5th Senate district =

American legislative district

Michigan's 5th State Senate district
Senator
Dayna Polehanki; D–Livonia
- Demographics: 60.6% White; 19.3% Black; 4.5% Hispanic; 9.7% Asian; 0.2% Native American; 0.3% Other; 5.4% Multiracial
- Population (2024): 258,146

Michigan's 5th Senate district is one of 38 districts in the Michigan Senate. It has been represented by Democrat Dayna Polehanki since 2023, following her primary defeat of fellow Democrat Betty Jean Alexander.

== Geography ==
District 5 encompasses part of Wayne County.

=== 2011 Apportionment Plan ===
District 5, as dictated by the 2011 Apportionment Plan, was based in central Wayne County, covering parts of western Detroit as well as the surrounding communities of Dearborn Heights, Garden City, Inkster, and Redford.

The district was largely located within Michigan's 13th congressional district, also extending into the 12th and 14th districts. It overlapped with the 7th, 8th, 9th, 10th, 11th, and 13th districts of the Michigan House of Representatives.

== List of senators ==
Senator	Party	Dates	Residence	Notes
Charles C. Hascall	Democratic	1835–1836	Mount Clemens	Resigned.
John Stockton	Democratic	1835–1836	Mount Clemens	
Ebenezer Raynale	Democratic	1835–1837	Franklin	
John Clark	Democratic	1835–1838	China	
Randolph Manning	Democratic	1837	Pontiac	
Jacob Summers	Democratic	1837–1838	Utica	
John Bartow	Democratic	1838	Flint	
Elijah F. Cook	Democratic	1838	Farmington	
James Kingsley	Democratic	1839	Ann Arbor	
Olney Hawkins	Whig	1839–1840	Ann Arbor	
Townsend E. Gidley	Whig	1839–1841	Jackson County	
James M. Edmunds	Whig	1840–1841	Ypsilanti	
Edward L. Fuller	Whig	1841	Ann Arbor	
David E. Deming	Whig	1842	Kalamazoo	
Digby V. Bell	Democratic	1842–1843	Ada	
George R. Redfield	Democratic	1842–1844	Adamsville	Elected in 1842 to fill a vacancy left by John S. Barry's election as governor.
Lewis F. Starkey	Democratic	1843–1844	Kalamazoo	
William A. Richmond	Democratic	1844–1845	Grand Rapids	
Joseph S. Chipman	Democratic	1845–1846	Niles	
Flavius J. Littlejohn	Democratic	1845–1846	Allegan	
Rix Robinson	Democratic	1846	Ada	
Loren Maynard	Democratic	1847	Marengo	
Nathaniel A. Balch	Democratic	1847–1848	Kalamazoo	
Campbell Waldo	Democratic	1848–1849	Albion	
David S. Walbridge	Whig	1849–1850	Kalamazoo	
Charles Dickey	Whig	1850–1852	Marshall	
George Thomas	Whig	1851–1852	Yorkville	
The 1850 Michigan Constitution takes effect, changing the district from a multi-member district to a single-member district.
David A. Wright	Democratic	1853–1854	Oakland County	
Rowland E. Trowbridge	Republican	1857–1860	Birmingham	
Byron G. Stout	Democratic	1861–1862	Oakland County	
Charles V. Babcock	Democratic	1863–1864	Southfield	
Loren Ludlow Treat	Democratic	1865–1866	Oxford	
Charles Draper	Republican	1867–1868	Pontiac	
P. Dean Warner	Republican	1869–1870	Farmington	
Layman B. Price	Unknown	1871–1872	Lakeville	
John J. Sumner	Republican	1873–1874	Bedford Township	
Heman J. Redfield	Democratic	1875–1878	Monroe	
Harry A. Conant	Republican	1879–1880	Monroe	
John Strong Jr.	Democratic	1881–1884	South Rockwood	
Christian Hertzler	Democratic	1885–1886	Monroe County	Elected on a fusion ticket.
George Howell	Republican	1887–1888	Tecumseh	
Arthur Dodge Gilmore	Republican	1889–1890	Blissfield	
George B. Horton	Republican	1891	Lenawee County	Lost seat after election challenge.
James H. Morrow	Democratic	1891–1894	Adrian	
Edwin Eaton	Republican	1895–1896	Hudson	
William Jibb	Republican	1897–1898	Maybee	
James W. Helme Jr.	Democratic	1899–1902	Adrian	
Simeon Van Akin	Republican	1903–1906	Ida	
Fred B. Kline	Republican	1907–1908	Addison	
George G. Scott	Republican	1909–1918	Wayne County	
Fred C. Rowe	Republican	1919–1920	Detroit	
Oscar A. Riopelle	Republican	1921–1924	Detroit	
Ari H. Woodruff	Republican	1925–1926	Wayne County	
George M. Condon	Republican	1927–1930	Detroit	
Clarence J. Dacey	Republican	1931–1932	Detroit	
Lee A. Gorman	Democratic	1933–1936	Detroit	
William M. Bradley	Democratic	1937–1940	Detroit	
Charles S. Blondy	Democratic	1941–1954	Detroit	
Stanley J. Novak	Democratic	1955–1964	Detroit	
Bernard F. O'Brien Jr.	Democratic	1965–1966	Detroit	
Arthur Cartwright	Democratic	1967–1978	Detroit	Resigned.
Jackie Vaughn III	Democratic	1978–1982	Detroit	
Michael J. O'Brien Jr.	Democratic	1983–1998	Detroit	
Burton Leland	Democratic	1999–2006	Detroit	
Tupac A. Hunter	Democratic	2007–2014	Detroit	
David Knezek	Democratic	2015–2018	Dearborn Heights	
Betty Jean Alexander	Democratic	2019–2022	Detroit	
Dayna Polehanki	Democratic	2023–present	Livonia	
Matt Koleszar	Democratic	(Note: Member-elect.)		

== Recent election results ==
=== 2020s ===
2026 Michigan Senate election
Primary election
Party	Candidate	Votes	%
Democratic	Matt Koleszar	41,595	100
Total votes		41,595	100
Republican	Estelle Oliansky	15,796	100
Total votes		15,796	100
General election
Democratic	Matt Koleszar	83,358	66.1
Republican	Estelle Oliansky	42,754	33.9
Total votes		126,112	100
Democratic hold			

2022 Michigan Senate election, District 5
Primary election
Party	Candidate	Votes	%
Democratic	Dayna Polehanki (incumbent)	19,822	74.0
Democratic	Velma Jean Overman	6,954	26.0
Total votes		26,776	100
Republican	Emily Bauman	6,909	42.0
Republican	Leonard C. Scott Jr.	5,442	33.1
Republican	Jody M. Rice-White	4,106	24.9
Total votes		16,457	100
General election
Democratic	Dayna Polehanki (incumbent)	64,455	61.1
Republican	Emily Bauman	41,091	38.9
Total votes		105,546	100
Democratic hold			

=== 2018 ===
2018 Michigan Senate election, District 5
Primary election
Party	Candidate	Votes	%
Democratic	Betty Jean Alexander	18,928	54.5
Democratic	David Knezek (incumbent)	15,803	45.5
Total votes		34,731	100
General election
Democratic	Betty Jean Alexander	70,010	77.4
Republican	DeShawn Wilkins	16,479	18.2
Working Class	Larry Betts	3,944	4.4
Total votes		90,433	100
Democratic hold			

=== 2014 ===
2014 Michigan Senate election, District 5
Primary election
Party	Candidate	Votes	%
Democratic	David Knezek	8,470	32.2
Democratic	Shanelle Jackson	6,317	24.0
Democratic	David Nathan	5,526	21.0
Democratic	Thomas Stallworth III	4,301	16.3
Democratic	Carrie O'Connor	1,189	4.5
Democratic	Frank Tomcsik	507	1.9
Total votes		26,310	100
General election
Democratic	David Knezek	59,680	81.8
Republican	Jennifer Rynicki	13,286	18.2
Total votes		72,966	100
Democratic hold			

=== Federal and statewide results ===
Year	Office	Results
2020	President	Biden 77.4 – 21.3%
2018	Senate	Stabenow 78.7 – 19.3%
2018	Governor	Whitmer 79.7 – 17.9%
2016	President	Clinton 76.1 – 20.7%
2014	Senate	Peters 81.1 – 15.9%
2014	Governor	Schauer 75.3 – 23.2%
2012	President	Obama 81.1 – 18.3%
2012	Senate	Stabenow 83.2 – 14.1%

== Historical district boundaries ==
Map	Description	Apportionment Plan	Notes
	Wayne County (part); Detroit (part); Ecorse; River Rouge	1964 Apportionment Plan	
	Wayne County (part); Detroit (part)	1972 Apportionment Plan	
	Wayne County (part); Detroit (part)	1982 Apportionment Plan	
	Wayne County (part); Detroit (part)	1992 Apportionment Plan	
	Wayne County (part); Dearborn Heights; Detroit (part); Inkster	2001 Apportionment Plan	
	Wayne County (part); Dearborn Heights; Detroit (part); Garden City; Inkster; Redford Township	2011 Apportionment Plan	
