= Jacob Summers =

American politician (1787–1863)

Member of the Michigan House of Representatives from the Macomb County district
- In office November 2, 1835 – January 1, 1837

Member of the Michigan Senate from the 5th district
- In office January 2, 1837 – January 6, 1838

Member of the Michigan Senate from the 4th district
- In office January 7, 1838 – January 3, 1841

Member of the Michigan Senate from the 1st district
- In office January 1, 1849 – January 31, 1851

Personal details
- Born: January 7, 1787 New Jersey
- Died: July 25, 1863 (aged 76)
- Party: Democratic

Jacob Summers (January 7, 1787 – July 25, 1863) was an American politician who served in the Michigan House of Representatives and Michigan Senate.

== Biography ==
Jacob Summers was born in New Jersey on January 7, 1787, the youngest of five sons of Jacob Summers and Mary Hiles. His father became a judge in Philadelphia, and Summers settled in Shelby, Michigan, in 1831, where he was a farmer.

Summers was elected as a Democrat to the Michigan House of Representatives in 1835 after the adoption of the state's first constitution. He later served six terms in the Michigan Senate. He served as a county supervisor in 1836, and was also an associate judge in Macomb County. He was described as "a man of strong mind, but uneducated, indolent and eccentric", and as an influential legislator.

In 1837, Summers was the director and president of a wildcat bank named the Bank of Utica. By the end of the following year, it was broke and was shut down.

He died on July 25, 1863.

=== Family ===
Summers had nine children: Phebe, Ann, George, Barbara, Rebecca, David, John, Margaret, and William.
