= David Knezek =

American politician (born 1986)

Member of the Michigan Senate from the 5th district
- In office January 1, 2015 – January 9, 2019
- Preceded by: Tupac Hunter
- Succeeded by: Betty Jean Alexander

Member of the Michigan House of Representatives from the 11th district
- In office January 1, 2013 – December 31, 2014
- Preceded by: David Nathan
- Succeeded by: Julie Plawecki

Personal details
- Born: August 13, 1986 (age 39) Dearborn Heights, Michigan, U.S.
- Party: Democratic
- Education: University of Michigan–Dearborn (BA)

Military service
- Allegiance: United States
- Branch: U.S. Marine Corps
- Service years: 2006–2012
- Rank: Sergeant
- Unit: 1st Battalion, 24th Marines; 2nd Battalion, 24th Marines; 3rd Battalion, 24th Marines
- Conflict: Iraq War
- Awards: Iraq Campaign Medal (3); National Defense Service Medal; Navy Achievement Medal; Navy Unit Commendation (2); Marine Corps Sea Service Deployment Ribbon (2); Global War on Terrorism Service Medal

David M. Knezek Jr. (born August 13, 1986) is an American politician who represents the 8th district on the Wayne County Commission. He is a member of the Democratic Party. Prior to his appointment to the Wayne County Commission in 2020, he served as a member of the Michigan Senate from 2015 to 2018 and as a member of the Michigan House of Representatives from 2013 to 2014. Knezek was defeated in the August 2018 Michigan Senate District 5 Democratic Primary by dark horse candidate Betty Jean Alexander who reported spending nothing on the campaign.

== Education and early career ==
Knezek has a bachelor's degree in political science from the University of Michigan-Dearborn. He then served in the U.S. military as a scout sniper platoon member in the United States Marine Corps, completing two tours of duty in Iraq. He was honorably discharged in 2014, having risen to the rank of sergeant.
