= Patrick Colbeck =

American politician

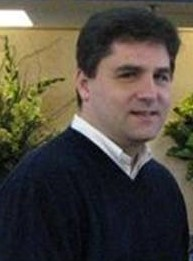

Member of the Michigan Senate from the 7th district
- In office January 1, 2011 – January 1, 2019
- Preceded by: Bruce Patterson
- Succeeded by: Dayna Polehanki

Personal details
- Born: October 7, 1965 (age 60) Dearborn, Michigan, U.S.
- Party: Republican
- Spouse: Angie Colbeck
- Education: University of Michigan (BS, MS)
- Profession: aerospace engineer
- Website: Policy Website

Patrick J. Colbeck is an American engineer, author, and politician. He is a former Republican member of the Michigan Senate, having represented a northwestern portion of Wayne County from 2011 to 2019. After reaching the two-term limit in the Michigan Senate, Colbeck unsuccessfully ran for the Republican nomination for Governor of Michigan in 2018, where he came in third, receiving 13 percent of the vote.

== Early life ==
Colbeck was born on October 7, 1965, in Dearborn, Michigan. He is a graduate of Detroit Catholic Central High School. He later graduated from the University of Michigan in Ann Arbor with a Bachelors of Science in Aerospace Engineering in 1987 and a Masters of Science in Aerospace Engineering in 1988. He went on to study Life Sciences for a summer at the International Space University in Strasbourg, France.

Colbeck was employed by Boeing as a Senior Design Engineer responsible for components of the Environmental Control and Life Support System and Quest Airlock module for International Space Station. He later provided contract systems engineering services to the Department of Defense for work on advanced simulation system for training military forces. Colbeck then served as a Management Consultant and President of Perspective Shifts, LLC. He launched Tek Made Easy in 2007 to provide SharePoint-based web services for clients. In 2006, he published the book Information Technology Roadmap for Professional Service Firms.

He is married to his wife Angie since 1995. They both are members of Northridge Church in Plymouth, Michigan, and call Canton, Michigan home.

== State senator ==
Senator Colbeck ran for office during the Tea Party wave of the 2010 elections. As a member of the Rattle With Us Tea Party in Plymouth, Michigan, he leveraged his retirement account to fund his campaign to become the first state senator elected directly into the Michigan Senate without ever having served in public office in three decades. During his first term in the Michigan Senate, he served on the Senate Leadership Team as the Assistant Caucus Chair. He also served as the Chairman of the Senate Appropriations Subcommittee for the Department of Military and Veterans Affairs and State Police budgets. During his second term, his outspoken opposition to Obamacare, tax increases, and Common Core standards motivated the Republican Senate Majority Leader Arlan Meekhof to make him the only returning Republican Senator to be denied any chairmanships. He later had him removed from all committees after Colbeck attended a Right to Life Dinner in the Senate Majority Leader's district.

In 2011–2012, Colbeck led the effort to make Michigan the 24th right-to-work state in the United States. Characterized as "arguably the most vocal conservative in the Michigan Senate", he led the effort to oppose state-based health exchanges in Michigan and Medicaid expansion. He was successful regarding the state-based exchange effort but, despite a procedural move that temporarily blocked passage, he was ultimately unsuccessful in stopping Medicaid expansion, which is now referred to as the Healthy Michigan program. He was also responsible for the passage of legislation to expand school choice and he has been a vocal opponent of the Common Core Standards Initiative.

He is a co-founder and board member for the Michigan Armed Forces Hospitality Center known as the Freedom Center. He chronicled his time in the Michigan Senate in his book Wrestling Gators: An Outsider's Guide to Draining the Swamp as well as chronicled the 2020 election in The 2020 Coup: What happened? What we can do?

=== Healthcare ===
Colbeck was a vocal critic of government-led healthcare expansion in the state of Michigan. His Forbes articles entitled "Free Market Healthcare Revolution: Why and How" and "The Case for Medicaid Block Grants" outline his views on healthcare.

=== Veteran services ===
In 2011, Senator Colbeck co-founded the MI Freedom Center (aka Michigan Armed Forces Hospitality Center) to serve military personnel, veterans and their families. As the chair of the Department of Military and Veterans Affairs budget, he implemented performance-based budgets that helped improve Michigan veteran services from among the worst in the nation to second in the nation.

=== Roads ===
In 2015, during the middle of an intense debate over how to fix Michigan's roads, Senator Colbeck challenged his colleagues to a debate over whether or not it was necessary to increase taxes to fix the roads. Senator Curtis Hertel accepted the challenge, and the ensuing debate was moderated by Kyle Melinn of MIRS News Service.

=== Environment ===
Colbeck has publicly stated that it is his opinion that wireless technology represents the primary environmental issue of the present day. In December 2018, he hosted a forum in Lansing to discuss the benefits and risks of wireless technology such as smart meters, cell phones and 5G networks. During his tenure, he introduced legislation which he claimed would empower consumers with increased choice as to the source of their electricity.

=== Controversy ===
He was widely criticized in 2018 for his remarks at a public forum featuring former member of the Muslim Brotherhood Kamal Saleem and former Department of Homeland Security affiliated counter-terrorism expert Philip Haney. During the forum, he referenced a document entered as evidence in the federal trial U.S. vs Holy Land Foundation called the "Explanatory Memorandum". The "Explanatory Memorandum" contains the Muslim Brotherhood's outline for what they refer to as "civilization jihad" in America. It cites organizations such as the Muslim Students Association as means to that end. The Muslim Students' Association is cited in the Explanatory Memorandum as an organization affiliated with the Muslim Brotherhood. Colbeck made a point of highlighting that Abdul El-Sayed, one of his Democratic Party opponents, was Vice President of the Muslim Students Association at the University of Michigan. Abdul El-Sayed responded to Colbeck's remarks, calling for the GOP Field to condemn Islamophobia and racism, and to Colbeck, "You may not hate Muslims, but Muslims definitely hate you."

During a public forum where he discussed belief in not utilizing tax increases, the Senator referred to his $72,000 salary as 'fixed income' since it remained constant throughout his eight years of public service. Critics took issue with his assertion, with some viewing the statement as insensitive to people of lower income levels. "I often use the term 'fixed' to describe variables that are constant," Colbeck claimed in a statement. "For example, I regularly refer to 'fixed' and 'variable' costs in financial discussions. Plus, I like to fix things and we have many problems in state government that can benefit from this attitude."

Colbeck called for the repeal of the Michigan business tax as a freshman state senator, claiming this and other cuts could save the state of Michigan $5.7 billion annually. When it became a House bill and it was time to vote on the repeal, he voted "no", citing issues with the legislation increasing taxes on seniors and property.

== 2018 gubernatorial campaign ==
On May 31, 2017, Colbeck filed to run for Michigan gubernatorial office to replace the then term-limited Republican incumbent governor Rick Snyder, whose second and final gubernatorial term expired specifically on January 1, 2019. Colbeck was widely recognized as the most conservative candidate for governor in the 2018 gubernatorial race.

Colbeck ran on what he called "principled solutions", asserting that the "solutions to the issues we face as a state are driven by guiding principles, not the whims of powerful special interests." His "principled solutions" are: job growth, excellence in education, no state income tax, budgets driven by priorities of the citizens of the state, better roads, quality and affordable healthcare, affordable auto insurance, defending one's rights and supporting those who secure rights.

In August 2018, Colbeck lost the Republican primary to then-Attorney General Bill Schuette. He received 13% of the Republican primary vote in a four-way primary race.

== Post-political career ==
In November 2020, Colbeck was a certified poll challenger at the TCF Center in Detroit, Michigan. He later appeared at the 2020 Wayne County Board of Canvassers and Michigan State Board of Canvassers certification meetings sharing concerns over unsubstantiated claims of election fraud. An affidavit filed by Colbeck claims that the computers used by election officials were connected to the Internet, which "opens the door" to possible vote manipulation. However, chief judge Timothy Kenny found that there was "no evidence" to support these claims.

Colbeck assisted My Pillow founder Mike Lindell in the production of a two-hour documentary, Absolute Proof, that aired on conservative media outlets and social media February 5, 2021, asserting Chinese cyber hacking was largely responsible for Joe Biden winning the presidency in 2020. The New York Times described the production the same day as "a falsehood-laden film about election fraud," reliant upon discredited testimony and baseless speculation. Colbeck appeared on FlashPoint February 12, 2021, as a guest of Kenneth Copeland Ministries' Victory Channel, insisting that Lindell's documentary stuck to "100% objective facts" and not "conjecture" and that Colbeck's role in Absolute Proof earned him "no fallout," and that "people are hungry for this information." The "fallout" relates to negative consequences Lindell incurred since promoting Donald Trump's 2020 election grievances and conspiracies propagated since November by lawyers associated with Trump.

In June 2021, Colbeck participated in a rally at Lansing, calling for an audit of Michigan's 2020 election similar to the Arizona audit. In the rally, Colbeck called the event a "spiritual battle" and compared the 2020 election to the persecution of Jesus Christ and in 2022 chronicled the 2020 election in The 2020 Coup: What happened. What we can do.

Colbeck has continued to push his claims of election fraud since the 2020 election, falsely asserting that Dominion Voting Systems' ballot-counting machines were connected to the internet and could have been hacked. As recently as May 2024, Colbeck claimed to have proof the voting machines were hacked from Serbia, a false claim amplified on social media by the polling firm Rasmussen Reports.
