= Philip Haney =

American national security official and whistleblower (1953-2020)

Philip B. Haney (July 9, 1953 – February 21, 2020) was an American U.S. Department of Homeland Security (DHS) national security official and whistleblower. Haney was found dead with a gunshot wound in 2020, in what was officially ruled a suicide two years later amid conspiracy theories that he had been murdered.

== Biography ==
Haney was a founding member of the DHS in 2003, and later a terrorism analyst at the National Targeting Center (NTC). He wrote in 2016 that he was ordered by the DHS in 2009 to "scrub" several hundred records of individuals tied to designated Islamist terror groups like Hamas from the federal database Treasury Enforcement Communications System (TECS). He published a book titled See Something, Say Nothing: A Homeland Security Officer Exposes the Government's Submission to Jihad the same year, which alleged a cover-up of Islamic terrorist activity by the Obama administration. He also testified before a Senate Judiciary subcommittee on radical Islam.

Haney is reported to have contacted the Washington Examiner in November 2019 about his plans to publish a second book, which would "go into the deep swamp and name names." A copy of the manuscript was likely to be found in Haney's RV and on a thumb drive, which Haney purportedly carried with him at all times.

Haney was found dead with a single gunshot wound on February 21, 2020, in a park-and-ride lot along State Highway 16 near State Highway 124 in Amador County, east of Sacramento. His death generated widespread right-wing conspiracy theories promoted by among others Rep. Steve King that he had been murdered by the "deep state", allegedly "because of all he knew of Islamic terrorist coverups," but it was officially ruled a suicide two years later in 2022 after the Amador County Sheriff's Office had brought in Federal Bureau of Investigation (FBI) crime scene investigators and other analysts to assist with the investigation.

== Bibliography ==
- Haney, Philip; Moore, Art (2016). See Something, Say Nothing: A Homeland Security Officer Exposes the Government's Submission to Jihad. WND Books. ISBN 978-1944229207.
