= Bruce Patterson (politician) =

American politician

Member of the Michigan Senate from the 7th district
- In office 2003–2011
- Preceded by: Christopher D. Dingell
- Succeeded by: Patrick Colbeck

Personal details
- Born: 1947
- Died: September 15th, 2025 (Aged 78)
- Party: Republican
- Spouse: Phyllis
- Profession: attorney

Bruce Patterson (1947-2025) was a Republican member of the Michigan Senate, representing the 7th district, covering parts of Wayne County, from 2003 to 2011.

Patterson defeated Democrat Mark Slavens in 2002 and 2006. He previously served two terms in the Michigan House of Representatives, from 1999 to 2002. He was the first freshman representative to serve as the Associate Speaker Pro Tempore. In his second term, he was elected the Majority Floor Leader.

Before being elected to the state legislature, Patterson served two terms as a Wayne County Commissioner, from 1995 to 1998. He was also an administrator at Eastern Michigan University and had twenty years experience in private law practice. He received a B.A. from Wayne State University in 1969 and a J.D. in 1972 from the Law School at Wayne State University.

In late 2009 he announced his bid for Attorney General for the state of Michigan. He did not pursue this bid through to the nomination process at the state Republican convention in Lansing.
