= Betty Jean Alexander =

American politician (born c. 1966)

Member of the Michigan Senate from the 5th district
- In office January 9, 2019 – December 31, 2022
- Preceded by: David Knezek
- Succeeded by: Dayna Polehanki

Personal details
- Born: c. 1966
- Party: Democratic
- Children: 2

Betty Jean Alexander (born c. 1966) is an American politician, who served as a Democratic member of the Michigan Senate, representing the 5th district from 2019 to 2022.

Alexander was described as a dark horse candidate due to her never holding public office, her being a single mother, and qualifying for food stamps before her election to the state senate. Alexander served as a member of the Michigan Legislative Black Caucus.

Political offices
Preceded by David Knezek	Michigan Senate; 5th district 2019–2022	Succeeded by Dayna Polehanki
