= Tupac A. Hunter =

American politician (born 1973)

Túpac Amaru Hunter
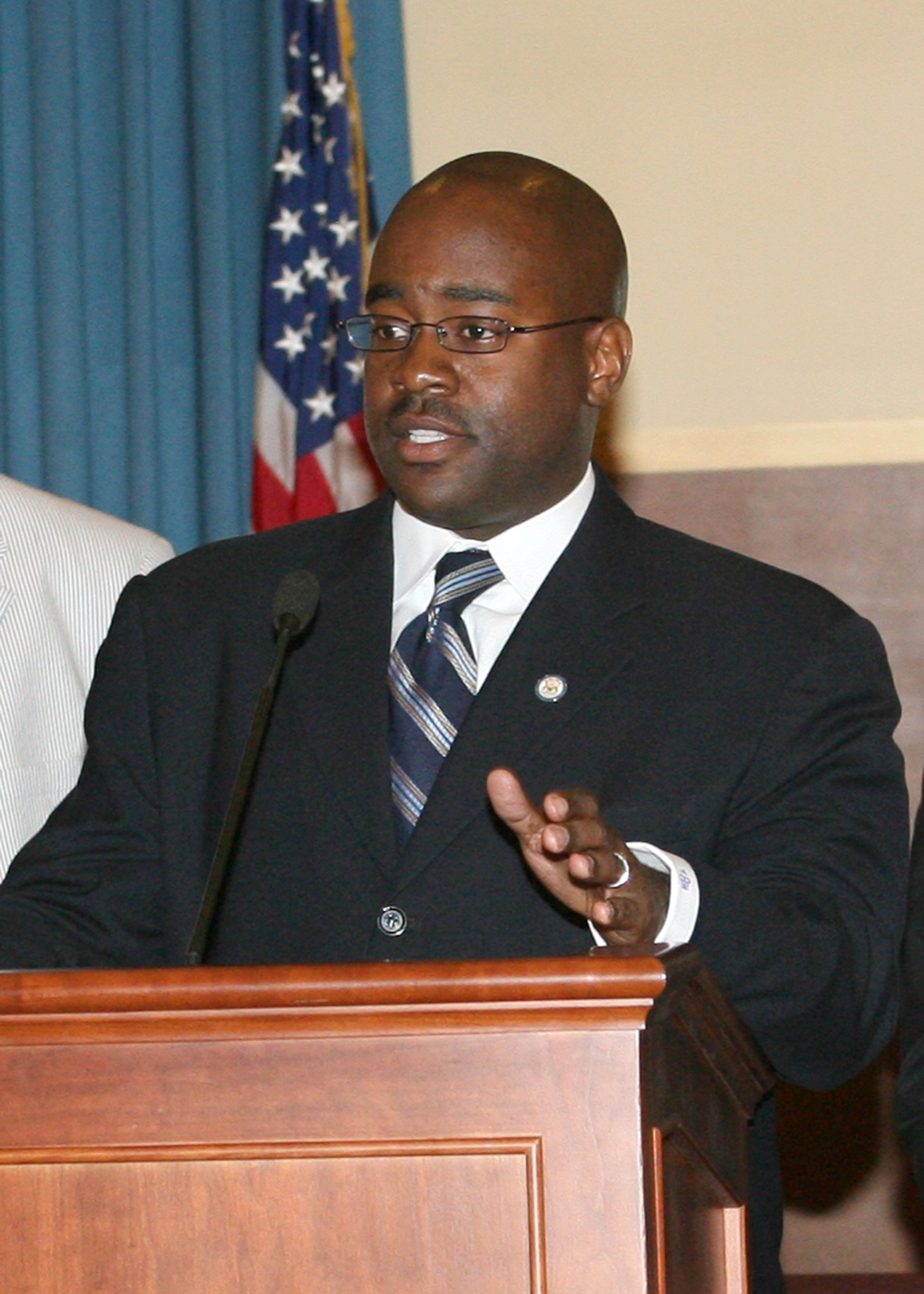

Member of the Michigan Senate from the 5th district
- In office January 1, 2007 – December 31, 2014
- Preceded by: Burton Leland
- Succeeded by: David Knezek

Minority Floor Leader of the Michigan Senate
- In office January 1, 2011 – December 31, 2014
- Deputy: Hoon Yung Hopgood
- Preceded by: Buzz Thomas
- Succeeded by: Morris Hood III

Member of the Michigan House of Representatives from the 9th district
- In office January 1, 2003 – December 31, 2006
- Preceded by: Fred Durhal Jr.
- Succeeded by: Shanelle Jackson

Personal details
- Born: July 25, 1973 (age 53) Detroit, Michigan, U.S.
- Party: Democratic
- Spouse: RaShawn M. Hunter
- Education: Morehouse College (B.A.); Oakland University (M.P.A.)

Túpac Amaru Hunter (born July 25, 1973) is an American politician who is a former member of the Michigan Senate, representing the 5th district which encompasses northwest Detroit, Dearborn Heights and Inkster. He served as the Minority Floor Leader.

== Background ==
Tupac A. Hunter was born and raised in Detroit. He graduated from the University of Detroit Jesuit High School and Academy in 1991. In 1995, he earned a Bachelor of Arts Degree in Urban Studies and Public Policy from Morehouse College in Atlanta, Georgia. He also holds a Master of Public Administration Degree from Oakland University.

== Political career ==
In November 2010, Tupac A. Hunter was re-elected to a second term in the Michigan Senate representing the citizens of the 5th District, which comprises northwest Detroit, Dearborn Heights, and Inkster. He was unanimously elected by his colleagues to serve as the Minority Floor Leader for the 2011-14 legislative session. He previously served as the Assistant Minority Leader during his first term in the Michigan Senate (2007–2010). Prior to being elected to the Michigan Senate, he served in the Michigan House of Representatives (2003–2006) where he was the Minority Whip (2005–2006).

== Issues ==
Senator Hunter's legislative interests covered banking and financial services, consumer protection, criminal justice, economic development, education, ethics in government, and health care insurance reform. His legislative agenda has produced 27 Public Acts and one constitutional amendment to date. He sponsored legislation to encourage financial literacy and fair lending practices; fought for the passage of Michigan's law mandating smoke-free workplaces; and advocated for policies relating to children's health, including legislation that would require insurance companies to cover treatments for children with autism spectrum disorders.

== Honors and recognition ==
- The Michigan Chronicle 40 Under 40 Honoree (2013)
- Michigan Association of State and Federal Program Specialists Roberta Stanley Legislative Award (2010)
- Autism Insurance for Michigan Coalition Legislative Champion Award (2010)
- American Heart Association Heart Champion Award (2010)
- Hearing Loss Association of Michigan Legislator of the Year Award (2009)
- Michigan Deaf Association Legislator of the Year Award (2009)
- Michigan Children’s Trust Fund Seasoned Advocate Award (2008)
- Michigan Credit Union League Legislator of the Year Award (2007)
- Who’s Who in Black Detroit Honoree (2006–2010)

== Electoral history ==
Michigan Senate District 5 General Election, 2010
Party	Candidate	Votes	%	±%
Democratic	Tupac A. Hunter (Incumbent)	44,055	83.3	
Republican	Bonnie Patrick	8,856	16.7	−66.6

Michigan Senate District 5 General Election, 2006
Party	Candidate	Votes	%	±%
Democratic	Tupac A. Hunter	56,252	85.3	
Republican	David Malhalab	8,164	12.4	−72.9
Green	James Wolbrink	1,510	2.3	−83.0

Michigan House of Representatives District 9 General Election, 2004
Party	Candidate	Votes	%	±%
Democratic	Tupac A. Hunter (Incumbent)	33,020	95.0	
Republican	Richard Zeile	1,729	5.0	−90.0

Michigan House of Representatives District 9 General Election, 2002
Party	Candidate	Votes	%	±%
Democratic	Tupac A. Hunter	22,098	94.5	
Republican	Richard Zeile	1,294	5.5	−89.0
