= Patrick Walsh =

Patrick Walsh may refer to:

== Religion ==
- Patrick Walsh (bishop of Waterford and Lismore) (died 1578), Irish Roman Catholic prelate
- Patrick Walsh (friar) (fl. 1580–1610), Irish ambassador and friar
- Patrick Walsh (bishop of Down and Connor) (1931–2023), Irish Roman Catholic prelate

== Law and politics ==
- Patrick Walsh (Wisconsin politician) (1830–1888), American politician
- Patrick Walsh (Georgia politician) (1840–1899), Irish-born American politician
- Patrick Walsh (Michigan politician) (1892–1978), American politician

== Others ==
- Patrick Walsh (piper) (fl. 19th century), Irish musician
- Patrick J. Walsh (FDNY Commissioner) (1873–1946), American fire commissioner
- Paddy Walsh (Patrick Yost Walsh, 1906–1988), Australian rules footballer
- Patrick Joseph Walsh (1908–1942), United States Navy officer
- Patrick M. Walsh (born 1955), United States Navy admiral
- Patrick Walsh (investor) (born 1975), American investor and entrepreneur
- Patrick C. Walsh, American urologist

== See also ==
- Pat Walsh (disambiguation)
