= Senator Holmes =

Senator Holmes may refer to:

== Members of the United States Senate ==
- David Holmes (politician) (1769–1832), U.S. Senator from Mississippi from 1820 to 1825
- John Holmes (Maine politician) (1773–1843), U.S. Senator from Maine from 1820 to 1827

== United States state senate members ==
- David S. Holmes Jr. (1914–1994), Michigan State Senate
- Ezekiel Holmes (1801–1865), Maine State Senate
- John Bee Holmes (1760–1827), South Carolina State Senate
- Linda Holmes (born 1959), Illinois State Senate
- Mitch Holmes (born 1962), Kansas State Senate
- Newland H. Holmes (1891–1965), Massachusetts State Senate
- Patricia Holmes (politician) (born c. 1959), Michigan State Senate
- Robert D. Holmes (1909–1976), Oregon State Senate
- Sybil Holmes (1889–1979), Massachusetts State Senate
