= Senator Finch =

Senator Finch may refer to:

- Bill Finch (politician) (born 1956), Connecticut State Senate
- Edward C. Finch (1862–1933), Washington State Senate
- Henry Lloyd Finch (1883–?), Mississippi State Senate
- Parley Finch (1844–1927), Iowa State Senate
- Silas Finch (fl. 1830s), Michigan State Senate
