= Angry Gods =

Marketing design company

Angry Gods is a marketing design company based in Los Angeles. It was founded by Krish Menon, and Gabe Miller serves as executive creative director. Their clients include Equinox, Embark, and others. In 2026, they drew controversy for an Equinox ad which was described by Asian content creators as "dehumanizing and sexualizing" toward East Asian women.

== History ==
=== Embark ===
In 2024, Angry Gods helmed the "Consulting is Dead" campaign for Embark, a business consulting firm. The campaign involved purchasing a full-page ad in The Wall Street Journal which proclaimed the death of consulting, as well as sending coffin-shaped boxes to chief financial officers.

=== Equinox ===
In 2026, Angry Gods produced a series of ads for the fitness company Equinox involving images generated by artificial intelligence with the tagline "Question Everything But Yourself," continuing Equinox's tradition of unveiling "provocative and irreverent campaigns" around the New Year. Drawing on "public AI memes and internet culture," the idea was envisioned by Angry Gods' executive creative director, Gabe Miller, as well as founder and CEO Krish Menon, while Equinox supplied the insight "that everything is exaggerated, absurd and that there's this contrast of where Equinox plays." Menon stated that the ads weren't against artificial intelligence itself but rather "just bad use of it." The campaign launched on January 1 and drew attention from various outlets like Adweek and Ad Age, which called it one of their "Ads of the week."

However, several Asian content creators like Eila Park Robertson found one of Angry Gods' image choices for the "Question Everything" portion of the campaign "dehumanizing and sexualizing" toward East Asian women, causing Equinox to pull the ads and issue a public apology. The image featured a female android character that looked characteristically Asian. Connecting the sexualization of East Asian women to a longstanding history of hate crimes and war crimes, Robertson stated: "What they callously overlooked was that they put Asian women in harm's way for the shock value...It tells me that our voices, female voices, the safety of women, and our concerns around our safety do not matter to Equinox."
