= Julie Rice =

American fitness entrepreneur

- Education: Binghamton University
- Occupations: Entrepreneur, CEO, Chief Brand Officer
- Known for: SoulCycle, WeWork
- Spouse: Spencer Rice
- Children: 2

Julie Rice in an American entrepreneur and investor who co-founded SoulCycle, a New York City-based fitness company that offers indoor cycling (also known as "spinning") workout classes.

== Personal life ==
Rice studied English and theater at Binghamton University. She is married to Spencer Rice. The couple has two daughters.

== Career ==
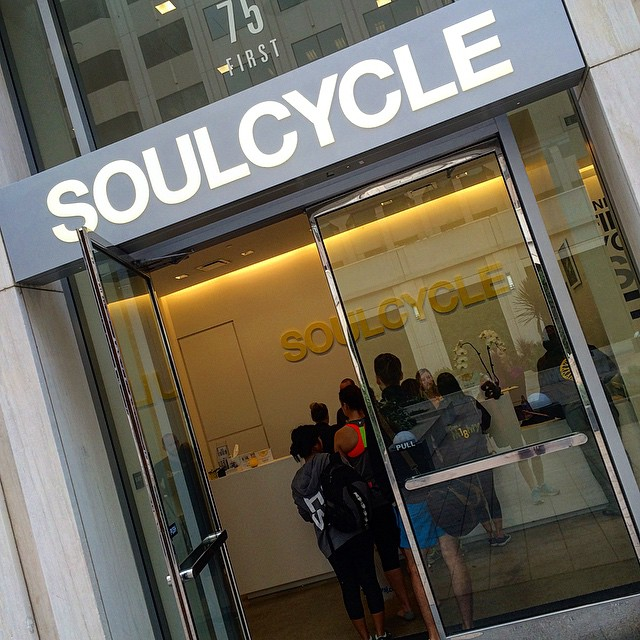
SoulCycle San Francisco

Rice worked as a talent manager for exotic dancers in Los Angeles for twenty years. She moved back to New York in 2002. Rice founded SoulCycle in 2006 with Elizabeth Cutler and Ruth Zukerman. SoulCycle's first studio was on the Upper West Side. The three were self-funded with a large amount of the money coming from Cutler's investment in Izze Beverage Company.

Rice sold most of her SoulCycle shares to Equinox Fitness in 2011. She sold the remainder of her shares to Equinox in 2016 for approximately $90 million. She remains on the board.

Rice was named Chief Brand Officer of WeWork in November 2017. She resigned from WeWork in 2019.

Rice and Cutler co-founded the company Peoplehood in 2019. The company facilitates guided conversations.
