= 1996 All-Ireland Junior Hurling Championship =

Championship Details
- Dates: 26 May - 14 September 1996
- Teams: 12

All Ireland Champions
- Winners: Galway (2nd win)
- Captain: Noel Larkin
- Manager: Michael Linnane

All Ireland Runners-up
- Runners-up: Kilkenny
- Captain: Ken O'Shea
- Manager: Noel Skehan

Provincial Champions
- Munster: Cork
- Leinster: Kilkenny
- Ulster: Tyrone
- Connacht: Not Played

Championship Statistics
- Matches Played: 11
- Total Goals: 37 (3.36 per game)
- Total Points: 238 (21.63 per game)
- Top Scorer: Jimmy Smiddy (4-15)

The 1996 All-Ireland Junior Hurling Championship was the 75th staging of the All-Ireland Junior Championship since its establishment by the Gaelic Athletic Association in 1912. The championship began on 26 May 1996 and ended on 14 September 1996.

Kilkenny entered the championship as the defending champions

The All-Ireland final was played on 14 September 1996 at O'Connor Park in Tullamore, between Galway and Kilkenny, in what was their first meeting in the final in 12 years. Galway won the match by 1-14 to 2-09 to claim their second championship title overall and a first title since 1939.

Cork's Jimmy Smiddy was the championship's top scorer with 4-15.

== Results ==
=== Leinster Junior Hurling Championship ===
==== Leinster quarter-final ====
29 May 1996 Quarter-final	Laois	1-10 - 1-07	Dublin	O'Moore Park
	F Cuddy 1-1, Fitzpatrick 0-3, P Peacock 0-2, D Russell 0-1, P Kirwan 0-1, M Boylan 0-1, D Rooney 0-1.		M Nolan 0-6, R McKenna 1-0, A Mynes 0-1.

==== Leinster semi-finals ====
19 June 1996 Semi-final	Offaly	1-08 - 2-13	Wexford	St. Brendan's Park
	T Dooley 1-4, K Farrell 0-2, N Murphy 0-1, K Weir 0-1.		S Byrne 1-4, M Morrissey 1-2, R O'Callaghan 0-3, D Ryan 0-2, P Barden 0-1, J O'Gorman 0-1.

19 June 1996 Semi-final	Laois	1-07 - 5-18	Kilkenny	O'Moore Park
	G Dunne 1-2, J Bates 0-2, D Russell 0-2, F Cuddy 0-1.		R Shortall 3-3, P O'Grady 0-8, B Phelan 1-1, R O'Neill 1-0, R Kelly 0-2, G Drennan 0-2, P Cahill 0-1, M Moran 0-1.

==== Leinster final ====
16 July 1996 Final	Kilkenny	1-13 - 1-07	Wexford	Nowlan Park
	P O'Grady 0-7. R Kelly 1-2, B Phelan 0-2, R O'Neill 0-1, A Hearne 0-1.		J O'Gorman 1-1, T Cushe 0-2, R O'Callaghan 0-1, D Ryan 0-1, S Doran 0-1, M Cleere 0-1.	Referee: O O'Neill (Meath)

=== Munster Junior Hurling Championship ===
==== Munster first round ====
26 May 1996 First round	Cork	4-13 - 1-10	Limerick	Páirc Uí Chaoimh
	J Smiddy 2-6, B O'Driscoll 1-2, D Murphy 1-0, D O'Connell 0-3, D Barrett 0-1, T McCarthy 0-1.		D Ryan 1-1, A Ryan 0-4, P Neenan 0-2, A Garvey 0-2, C Smith 0-1.	Referee: P Moore (Waterford)

2 June 1996 First round	Waterford	1-11 - 2-10	Tipperary	Walsh Park
	JP Fitzpatrick 0-5, M Hubbard 1-0, P Sutton 0-3, G O'Shea 0-1, T Casey 0-1, D Casey 0-1.		D O'Shea 2-0, A Hogan 0-6, D Corcoran 0-2, P Hogan 0-1, D O'Connor 0-1.	Referee: T O'Sullivan (Clare)

==== Munster semi-finals ====
14 June 1996 Semi-final	Tipperary	w/o - scr.	Kerry	Austin Stack Park

16 June 1996 Semi-final	Cork	2-16 - 1-07	Clare	Gaelic Grounds
	D O'Connell 1-4, J Smiddy 1-1, T McCarthy 0-4, B O'Driscoll 0-2, D Murphy 0-2, A Walsh 0-1, B Sheehan 0-1, D Barrett 0-1.		C Egan 1-1, B Moroney 0-3, M Daffy 0-1, E Sheedy 0-1, T Fahy 0-1.	Referee: M Cahill (Tipperary)

==== Munster final ====
25 June 1996 Final	Tipperary	2-10 - 2-15	Cork	Leahy Park
	J Ryan 1-4, P Hogan 0-4, G Maguire 1-0, S Colum 0-1, D O'Shea 0-1.		J Smiddy 1-3, B O'Driscoll 1-2, T McCarthy 0-4, J O'Sullivan 0-3, P Sheehan 0-1, D Murphy 0-1, M Daly 0-1.

=== All-Ireland Junior Hurling Championship ===
==== All-Ireland semi-finals ====
7 August 1996 Semi-final	Galway	1-13 - 3-07	Cork	Cusack Park
	F Healy 0-4, A Kerins 0-4, B Larkin 1-0, T Kirwan 0-1, N Larkin 0-1, B Carr 0-1, F O'Brien 0-1, M Connolly 0-1.		D O'Connell 1-2, B O'Driscoll 1-1, B Sheehan 1-1, J Smiddy 0-2, M Daly 0-1.	Referee: A Mac Suibhne (Dublin)

30 August 1996 Semi-final replay	Galway	1-15 - 1-06	Cork	Cusack Park
	M Connolly 0-7, F Healy 0-4, B Larkin 1-0, M Lynskey 0-2, F Gantley 0-1, A Kerins 0-1.		M McElhinney 1-1, J Smiddy 0-3, M Daly 0-1, T McCarthy 0-1.	Referee: A Mac Suibhne (Dublin)

==== All-Ireland final ====
14 September 1996 Final	Galway	1-14 - 2-09	Kilkenny	O'Connor Park
	M Connolly 0-7, B Larkin 1-2, F Healy 0-3, F Gantley 0-1, A Kerins 0-1.		K O'Shea 2-0, P O'Grady 0-5, R Moore 0-1, B Barcoe 0-1, B Phelan 0-1, R Shortall 0-1.	Referee: M Wadding (Waterford)

== Championship statistics ==
=== Top scorers ===
Top scorers overall

Rank	Player	County	Tally	Total	Matches	Average
1	Jimmy Smiddy	Cork	4-25	27	5	5.40
2	Pat O'Grady	Kilkenny	0-20	20	3	6.66
3	Brian O'Driscoll	Cork	3-07	16	5	3.20
3	Dan O'Connell	Cork	2-10	16	5	3.20
5	Michael Connolly	Galway	0-15	15	3	5.00

Top scorers in a single game

Rank	Player	Club	Tally	Total	Opposition
1	Robert Shortall	Kilkenny	3-03	12	Laois
1	Jimmy Smiddy	Cork	2-06	12	Limerick
3	Pat O'Grady	Kilkenny	0-08	8	Laois
4	John Ryan	Tipperary	1-04	7	Cork
4	Dan O'Connell	Cork	1-04	7	Clare
4	Séamus Byrne	Wexford	1-04	7	Offaly
4	Timmy Dooley	Offaly	1-04	7	Wexford
4	Pat O'Grady	Kilkenny	0-07	7	Wexford
4	Michael Connolly	Galway	0-07	7	Cork
4	Michael Connolly	Galway	0-07	7	Kilkenny
