= Elizabeth Cutler =

American fitness entrepreneur

Elizabeth Cutler is an American entrepreneur and venture capitalist. She co-founded SoulCycle, an indoor cycling brand.

== Early life ==
Cutler obtained her undergraduate degree in Art History and Religious Studies from the University of Colorado. She went to India, where she lived in a monastery as part of her studies, and traveled throughout Southeast Asia.

== Career ==
Cutler's early career after graduation included work in Telluride, Colorado, where she worked as a real estate agent like her mother. She then moved to New York City, where she resides with her husband, Allen, and their two daughters.

In 2006, Cutler co-founded SoulCycle with Julie Rice and Ruth Zukerman. The concept was an indoor cycling gym, and she became its co-CEO until 2015. From one studio, the business quickly expanded, and by 2015, it had 46 locations and employed 1,500 people. Its popularity was attributed to the 45-minute classes, which combined fitness and fun. Its clients included prominent personalities such as Michelle Obama, Chelsea Clinton, Harry Styles, and David Beckham, among others. The startup was acquired in stages by Equinox Fitness: first, a majority stake in 2011; and, full ownership in 2016. She reportedly earned $90 million from the sale.

A year later, Cutler launched Dopamine Ventures, which aimed to advise and finance startups. The company had funded the co-working space the Wing, Iconiq, and Cava, a Middle Eastern fast-casual restaurant chain. Her new ventures also included Peoplehood, which she co-founded with Rice. The business involved a 60-minute “conversation Circle”, where participants develop skills required for connection. The concept, which was dubbed as SoulCycle without the bicycle, was introduced post-pandemic and anticipated the so-called “global loneliness crisis”.

In 2013 and 2014, Cutler was listed as one of Goldman Sachs’ 100 Builders + Innovators. She was also recognized a year later as one of Fast Company’s Most Creative People in Business.

=== Real Estate ===
Aside from her startup ventures, Cutler is still involved with real estate. In 2025, she sold her Colorado estate, which was listed for $29.5 million. In the same year, she purchased Cobble Hill brownstone in New York City for $5.7 million.
