= Michigan's 4th Senate district =

American legislative district

Michigan's 4th State Senate district
Senator
Darrin Camilleri; D–Trenton
- Demographics: 72.6% White; 13.5% Black; 6.3% Hispanic; 2% Asian; 0.2% Native American; 0.4% Other; 5.1% Multiracial
- Population (2024): 266,275

Michigan's 4th Senate district is one of 38 districts in the Michigan Senate. It has been represented by Democrat Darrin Camilleri since 2023, succeeding fellow Democrat Marshall Bullock.

== Geography ==
District 4 encompasses part of Wayne County.

=== 2011 Apportionment Plan ===
District 4, as dictated by the 2011 Apportionment Plan, was based in central Detroit in Wayne County, also covering the nearby communities of Allen Park, Lincoln Park, and Southgate.

The district was split three ways among Michigan's 12th, 13th, and 14th congressional districts, and overlapped with the 3rd, 4th, 5th, 6th, 7th, 10th, 13th, and 14th districts of the Michigan House of Representatives. At just over 47 square miles, it was the smallest Senate district in the state.

== List of senators ==
Senator	Party	Dates	Residence	Notes
Silas Finch	Democratic	1835–1836	Saline	
William J. Moody	Democratic	1835–1836	Jackson	
Henry Rumsey	Democratic	1835–1837	Ann Arbor	
George B. Cooper	Democratic	1837–1838	Jackson	
William Moore	Democratic	1837–1838	York	
James Kingsley	Democratic	1838	Ann Arbor	
Ebenezer B. Harrington	Democratic	1839	Port Huron	
Jacob Summers	Democratic	1839–1840	Utica	
Justin Rice	Whig	1840–1841	Port Huron	
DeWitt C. Walker	Democratic	1841	Romeo	
Townsend E. Gidley	Whig	1842	Jackson County	
Henry Hewitt	Democratic	1842	Marshall	
Edward A. Warner	Democratic	1842–1843	Coldwater	
Edward Bradley	Democratic	1843	Marshall	
William J. Moody	Democratic	1843–1844	Jackson	
Abner Pratt	Democratic	1844–1845	Marshall	
Jesse F. Turner	Democratic	1844–1845	DeWitt	
James Videto	Democratic	1845–1846	Spring Arbor	
George A. Coe	Whig	1846	Coldwater	Successfully contested the seat of Ephraim B. Danforth.
Loren Maynard	Democratic	1846	Marengo	
Isaac D. Toll	Democratic	1847	Fawn River	
Jerome B. Fitzgerald	Democratic	1847–1848	St. Joseph	
Alexander H. Redfield	Democratic	1848–1849	Cassopolis	
John McKinney	Democratic	1849–1850	Paw Paw	
Henry H. Riley	Democratic	1850–1852	Constantine	
Philotus Haydon	Whig	1851–1852	Hamilton	
The 1850 Michigan Constitution takes effect, changing the district from a multi-member district to a single-member district.
Seneca Newberry	Democratic	1853–1854	Rochester	
Alfred J. Boss	Republican	1855–1856	Pontiac	
John L. Near	Republican	1857–1858	Brownstown	
William E. Warner	Democratic	1859–1860	Rawsonville	
John L. Near	Republican	1861–1862	Brownstown	
Andrew S. Robertson	Democratic	1863–1864	Mount Clemens	
Giles Hubbard	Republican	1865–1866	Mount Clemens	
Charles Andrews	Republican	1867–1870	Armada	
Gilbert Hatheway	Republican	1871	New Baltimore	Died in office.
Seymour Brownell	Democratic	1872	Utica	
J. Webster Childs	Republican	1873–1874	Ypsilanti	
Jeremiah D. Corey	Democratic	1875–1876	Manchester	
John L. Burleigh	Democratic	1877–1878	Ann Arbor	
J. Webster Childs	Republican	1879–1880	Ypsilanti	
David G. Rose	Democratic	1881–1882	Manchester	
Charles H. Richmond	Democratic	1883–1884	Ann Arbor	
Reuben Kempf	Republican	1885–1886	Ann Arbor	
James S. Gorman	Democratic	1887–1890	Chelsea	In 1886, elected on a fusion ticket with the Greenbackers.
Augustin C. McCormick	Democratic	1891–1892	Grafton	
Charles F. Gibson	Republican	1893–1894	Detroit	
Herbert Smalley	Republican	1895–1896	Detroit	
Samuel J. Lawrence	Republican	1897–1898	Wyandotte	
William T. McGraw	Republican	1899–1900	Detroit	
Solon Goodell	Republican	1901–1904	Wayne County	
Seneca C. Traver	Republican	1905–1908	River Rouge	
John N. Anhut	Republican	1909–1910	Detroit	
James H. Lee	Democratic	1911–1912	Detroit	
Robert Y. Ogg	Republican	1913–1916	Detroit	
George M. Condon	Republican	1917–1926	Detroit	
Arthur E. Wood	Republican	1927–1932	Detroit	
Edward B. McKenna	Democratic	1933–1934	Detroit	
Arthur E. Wood	Republican	1935–1936	Detroit	
James A. Burns	Democratic	1937–1938	Detroit	
Allen G. Ludington	Republican	1939–1940	Detroit	
James A. Burns	Democratic	1941–1942	Detroit	
Arthur E. Wood	Republican	1943–1944	Detroit	
Daniel J. Ryan	Democratic	1945–1946	Detroit	
Arthur E. Wood	Republican	1947–1948	Detroit	
Patrick Walsh	Democratic	1949–1954	Detroit	
Charles S. Blondy	Democratic	1955–1964	Detroit	
Coleman A. Young	Democratic	1965–1973	Detroit	Resigned after elected mayor of Detroit.
David S. Holmes Jr.	Democratic	1974–1994	Detroit	Died in office.
Patricia Holmes	Democratic	1994	Detroit	
Jackie Vaughn III	Democratic	1995–2002	Detroit	
Buzz Thomas	Democratic	2003–2010	Detroit	
Virgil Smith Jr.	Democratic	2011–2016	Detroit	Resigned.
Ian Conyers	Democratic	2016–2018	Detroit	
Marshall Bullock	Democratic	2019–2022	Detroit	
Darrin Camilleri	Democratic	2023–present	Trenton	

== Recent election results ==
=== 2020s ===
2026 Michigan Senate election
Primary election
Party	Candidate	Votes	%
Democratic	Darrin Camilleri (incumbent)	35,309	100
Total votes		35,309	100
Republican	Marcie Grzywacz	18,602	100
Total votes		18,602	100
General election
Democratic	Darrin Camilleri (incumbent)	69,907	57.4
Republican	Marcie Grzywacz	49,325	40.5
Working Class	Walter Willis	1,640	1.35
U.S. Taxpayers'	Beth Ann Socia	919	0.75
Total votes		121,791	100
Democratic hold			

2022 Michigan Senate election, District 4
Primary election
Party	Candidate	Votes	%
Republican	Houston W. James	8,623	40.7
Republican	Michael Frazier	4,764	22.5
Republican	James Chapman	4,142	19.6
Republican	Beth Socia	3,639	17.2
Total votes		21,168	100
General election
Democratic	Darrin Camilleri	64,387	55.3
Republican	Houston W. James	51,962	44.7
Total votes		116,349	100
Democratic hold			

=== 2018 ===
2018 Michigan Senate election, District 4
Primary election
Party	Candidate	Votes	%
Democratic	Marshall Bullock	12,384	44.3
Democratic	Fred Durhal III	10,706	38.3
Democratic	Carron Pinkins	4,885	17.5
Total votes		27,975	100
General election
Democratic	Marshall Bullock	58,107	78.3
Republican	Angela Savino	16,115	21.7
Total votes		74,222	100
Democratic hold			

=== 2016 special election ===
In March 2016, incumbent Virgil Smith Jr. resigned after being sentenced to prison for shooting up his wife's car, and a special election was called to fill the seat.

2016 Michigan Senate special election, District 4
Primary election
Party	Candidate	Votes	%
Democratic	Ian Conyers	6,063	34.5
Democratic	Fred Durhal Jr.	4,482	25.5
Democratic	Patricia Holmes	1,362	7.8
Democratic	James Cole Jr.	1,327	7.6
Democratic	Helena Scott	1,272	7.2
Democratic	Carron Pinkins	1,104	6.3
Democratic	Vanessa Simpson Olive	773	4.4
Democratic	Ralph Rayner	602	3.4
Democratic	Howard Worthy	581	3.3
Total votes		17,566	100
General election
Democratic	Ian Conyers	69,305	76.6
Republican	Keith Franklin	21,225	23.4
Total votes		90,530	100
Democratic hold			

=== 2014 ===
2014 Michigan Senate election, District 4
Primary election
Party	Candidate	Votes	%
Democratic	Virgil Smith Jr. (incumbent)	11,597	49.8
Democratic	Rashida Tlaib	9,742	41.9
Democratic	Howard Worthy	1,937	8.3
Total votes		23,276	100
General election
Democratic	Virgil Smith Jr. (incumbent)	49,970	81.9
Republican	Keith Franklin	11,047	18.1
Total votes		61,018	100
Democratic hold			

=== Federal and statewide results ===
Year	Office	Results
2020	President	Biden 74.2 – 24.6%
2018	Senate	Stabenow 76.2 – 21.7%
2018	Governor	Whitmer 77.4 – 20.1%
2016	President	Clinton 74.6 – 22.3%
2014	Senate	Peters 81.8 – 15.1%
2014	Governor	Schauer 75.8 – 22.6%
2012	President	Obama 82.8 – 16.6%
2012	Senate	Stabenow 84.7 – 12.8%

== Historical district boundaries ==
Map	Description	Apportionment Plan	Notes
	Wayne County (part); Detroit (part)	1964 Apportionment Plan	
	Wayne County (part); Detroit (part)	1972 Apportionment Plan	
	Wayne County (part); Detroit (part)	1982 Apportionment Plan	
	Wayne County (part); Detroit (part)	1992 Apportionment Plan	
	Wayne County (part); Detroit (part)	2001 Apportionment Plan	
	Wayne County (part); Allen Park; Detroit (part); Lincoln Park; Southgate	2011 Apportionment Plan	
