= Pat Walsh =

Pat Walsh may refer to:

- Pat Walsh (author), American publishing consultant
- Pat Walsh (hurler) (born 1963), Irish hurler
- Pat Walsh (rugby) (1879–1953), Australian dual-code rugby footballer
- Pat Walsh (rugby union) (1936–2007), New Zealand rugby union footballer
- Pat Walsh (social entrepreneur) (born 1979), American social entrepreneur

== See also ==
- Patrick Walsh (disambiguation)
