= Town Sports International Holdings =

U.S. fitness center company

Town Sports International Holdings Inc
- Trade name: LIV Fitness Clubs; Palm Beach Sports Clubs; Christi's Fitness
- Type: Public
- Traded as: OTCID Basic: CLUBQ
- Industry: Health club
- Founded: 1973; 53 years ago
- Headquarters: Jupiter, Florida
- Number of locations: 6 (Jun 22, 2021)

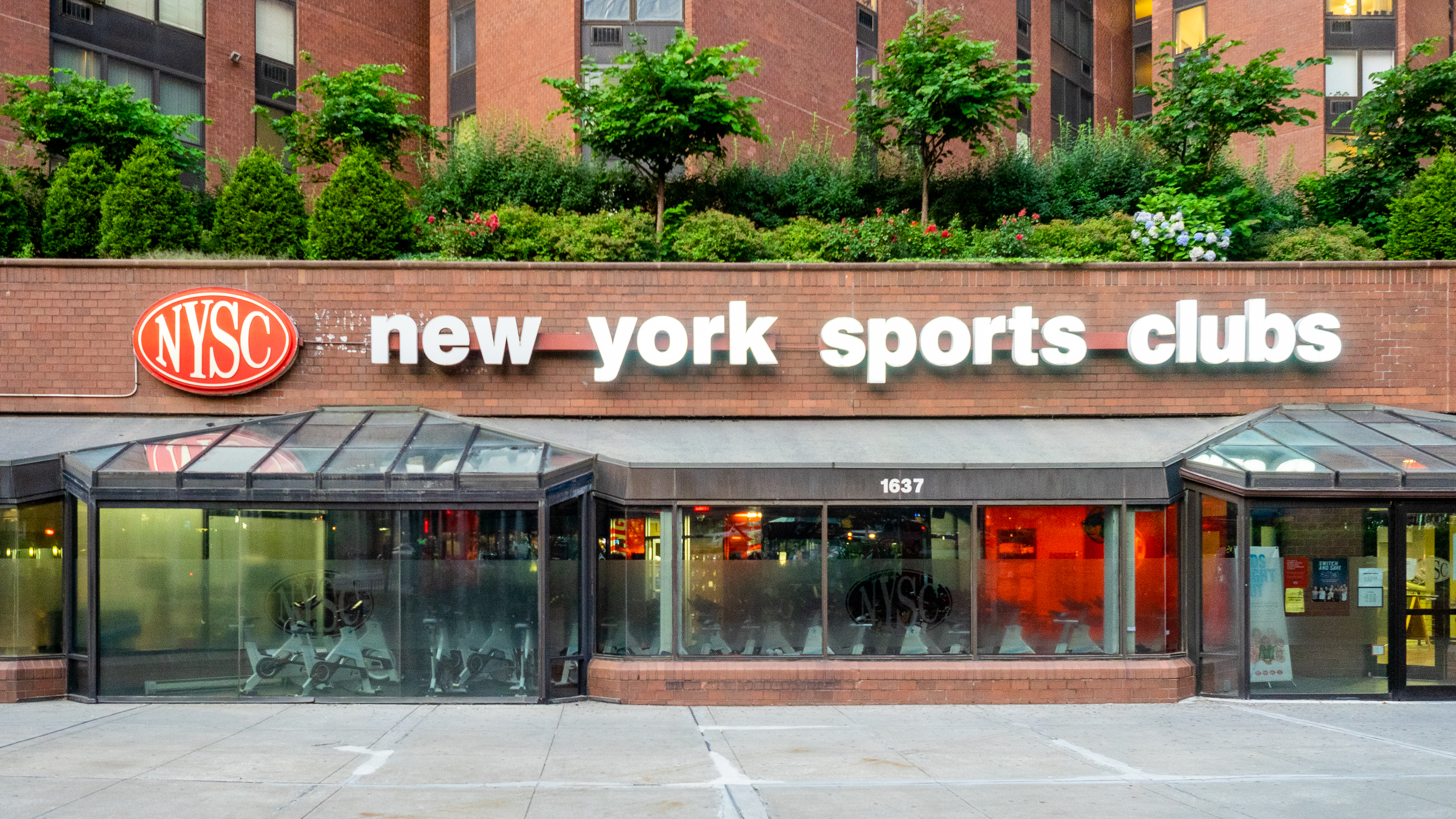
A New York Sports Club location on the Upper East Side, New York City

Town Sports International Holdings (or TSI Holdings) is an operator of fitness centers in Florida and in Puerto Rico. Its current brands include Liv Fitness Clubs, Palm Beach Sports Clubs, and Christi's Fitness. Former brands include New York Sports Clubs, Boston Sports Clubs, Philadelphia Sports Clubs, Washington Sports Clubs, Lucille Roberts, TMPL Gym and Total Woman Gym and Spa.

Founded in 1973 and based in New York City, the firm went public on June 6, 2006, on NASDAQ.

As of June 30, 2006, TSI Holdings operated 152 clubs (part-owner of a few) with approximately 551,000 members. This included 102 New York Sports Clubs in New York, New Jersey, and Connecticut; 27 Boston Sports Clubs in Massachusetts and Rhode Island; 12 Washington Sports Clubs in D.C., Maryland, and Virginia; 5 Philadelphia Sports Clubs; 2 BFX Studios; 3 clubs in Switzerland; and another D.C. club with a different brand name. Patrick Walsh, a major investor in Truth Social was appointed CEO on September 30, 2016. TSI's CFO, Philip Juhan, also later invested in, and serves as CFO of Truth Social

Its current corporate office is located in Jupiter, Florida.

Many locations permanently closed during the COVID-19 pandemic in the United States, including the only location in Rhode Island.

== Legal proceedings ==
TSI has had multiple legal issues regarding its cancellation policies.

In 2016, the Attorney General of the District of Columbia investigated TSI for violations of the District's consumer protection laws. TSI and the Attorney General settled this dispute in November, 2016, with TSI agreeing "to clearly disclose its cancellation policies, cease misleading consumers about how they can cancel, and not bill consumers who canceled their memberships." In January 2019, the Attorney General of DC filed a new lawsuit against TSI, alleging that the company had violated the terms of its 2016 settlement and again violated the District's consumer protection laws.

In May 2019, a separate class action lawsuit was filed in New York against TSI, further alleging that the chain ignored members' cancellation requests and collects fees after closing members' accounts.

Forbes magazine reported that the company had a history of mishandling customer memberships, and that as of April 2020 had at least 24 membership-related federal lawsuits filed against it in a five-year span; a number disproportionately higher than TSI's competitors. The company also had an F rating from the Better Business Bureau for failure to respond to 54 complaints and failure to resolve 22 more. A former employee told Forbes that while no gym company was "100% ethical" there was "maybe a little too much" unethical behavior at the company. Several employees stated that many of the company's current issues came to a head after the appointment of Walsh as CEO.

== COVID-19 Controversy ==
On March 16, 2020, all gyms were temporarily closed due to the COVID-19 crisis, and all non-executive staff subsequently terminated. Town Sports International continued to charge member dues, resulting in widespread outrage.

On March 26, Mary Namorato filed suit against Town Sports International, alleging that the company was “defrauding and stealing from gym members” by continuing to charge the chain's approximately 605,000 members. The complaint stated that the company had made “it virtually impossible for members to cancel their memberships and has even refused to honor many members’ cancellation requests”. Namorato's representative stated that competitors Equinox Group, Planet Fitness and Blink Fitness had automatically suspended membership charges due to the closures."

On April 3, the Attorneys General of the states of New York, Pennsylvania and the District of Columbia sent a letter to CEO Patrick Walsh demanding he immediately cease charging monthly membership fees. Five days later the company consented to freeze memberships across the board, however, the return of the fees that had been charged was not addressed. An article in Bloomberg revealed that Walsh was considering having the company file for bankruptcy.

Three weeks later, under pressure from the Attorneys General, the company agreed to issue credits and refunds of fees that had been charged to members.

In August 2025, a Massachusetts court ordered Walsh to pay nearly $4 million in restitution to former Boston Sports Clubs customers who were charged membership fees in April 2020 when the clubs were closed due to the Covid pandemic. In March 2026, the Massachusetts Attorney General's Office announced that it would distribute the restitution proceeds to approximately 47,000 affected customers.

== Restructuring ==
On September 14, 2020, Town Sports International filed for Chapter 11 bankruptcy, which allows for the company to remain open and to reorganize. In the filing, the company reported liabilities in the range of $500 million and $1 billion with assets in the same range. Most of the liabilities are in the form of back rent.

On September 16, Bloomberg reported that Town Sports International and its creditors were pursuing a sale of the business.

On December 28, SGB Media reported TSI subsidiary Empire Holdings and Investments, LLC announced the receipt of a $100 million loan facility in principal from Kennedy Lewis in exchange for 51% common stock.

As of June 2021, many gyms previously owned by Town Sports International have been transferred to new ownership under the New York Sports Clubs family of brands, including New York Sports Clubs, Philadelphia Sports Clubs, Boston Sports Clubs, and Washington Sports Clubs, along with Around the Clock Fitness and Lucille Roberts. Town Sports International itself only lists three subsidiaries as of present: Palm Beach Sports Club, LIV Fitness Clubs, and Christi's Fitness.

== See also ==
- Blink Fitness
- Equinox Group
- Life Time Fitness
- Planet Fitness
