= Edward Finch =

Edward Finch may refer to:

== Politicians ==
- Edward Finch (diplomat) (c. 1697–1771), British diplomat and politician
- Edward Finch (British Army officer) (1756–1843), British general and MP for Cambridge
- Edward C. Finch (1862–1933), American politician
- Edward R. Finch (1873–1965), American lawyer and politician

== Other ==
- Edward Finch (composer) (1664–1738), English composer
- Edward Finch (divine) (fl. 1630–1641), English Royalist divine
