= Senator Moody =

Senator Moody may refer to:

== Members of the United States Senate ==
- Ashley Moody (born 1975), U.S. Senator from Florida
- Blair Moody (1902–1954), U.S. Senator from Michigan
- Gideon C. Moody (1832–1904), U.S. Senator from South Dakota

== United States state senate members ==
- Dan Moody (Georgia politician), Georgia State Senate
- James M. Moody (1858–1901), North Carolina State Senate
- Jim Moody (1935–2019), Wisconsin State Senate
- Ralph E. Moody (1915–1997), Alaska State and Territorial Senate
- William J. Moody (1796–1850s), Michigan State Senate
- William Moody (Maine politician) (1770–1822), Massachusetts State Senate
