= 1988 Michigan elections =

- November 8, 1988

The 1988 Michigan election were held in the U.S. state of Michigan on November 8, 1988. The state primary was held on August 2.

== Federal ==
=== Presidential caucuses ===
The Republican presidential caucuses were held on January 14, 1988, in Michigan. George H. W. Bush won Michigan. He would go on to win the Republican nomination nationally.

The Democratic presidential caucuses were held on March 26, 1988, in Michigan. Jesse Jackson won Michigan. Michael Dukakis would go on to win the Democratic nomination nationally.

=== Presidential general election ===
Republican nominee George H. W. Bush won Michigan over Democratic nominee Michael Dukakis. All 20 of Michigan's electoral votes went to Bush. Bush would also win the presidency nationally.

=== U.S. Senate ===
Incumbent Democratic U.S. senator Don Riegle defeated Republican nominee James Whitney Dunn.

=== U.S. House of Representatives ===
All incumbents were re-elected. Michigan's U.S. House delegation maintained its 11–7 Democratic majority.

== Legislature ==
=== Senate special election ===
There was a special election in the 2nd state Senate district. The special primary was held on February 23. The special general was held on March 15. The special election was triggered when incumbent Democrat Basil W. Brown resigned following criminal conviction. The special election was won by Virgil C. Smith.

=== House of Representatives ===
Republicans gained three seats in the state House, but Democrats maintained control of the chamber with 61–49 majority.

== Judiciary ==
=== Supreme Court ===
Incumbent justices Republican James H. Brickley and independent Charles Levin were re-elected.

== Michigan State Board of Education and University boards ==
=== Michigan State Board of Education ===
Incumbent Republicans Norman Stockmeyer and Edmund Vandette did not seek re-election. Republicans Barbara Dumouchelle and Marilyn Lundy won election. This preserved the even 4–4 split of Democrats and Republicans on the board.

=== Michigan State University Board of Trustees ===
Incumbent Republican Patrick Wilson did not seek re-election. Democrat Robert Weiss and incumbent Republican Thomas Reed won election.

=== University of Michigan Board of Regents ===
Incumbents Democrat Nellie Varner and Republican Deane Baker won re-election.

=== Wayne State University Board of Governors ===
Incumbents Republican Richard VanDusen and Democrat Murray Jackson won re-election.

== Ballot initiatives ==
=== State ballot proposals ===
There were four state ballot proposal voted upon on November 8, 1988, in Michigan. All were approved. Proposal A sought to end Medicaid funding for abortions. Proposal B sought to enshrine the rights of victims of crimes in the state constitution. Proposal C sought to allow the sale of state bonds for toxic waste clean up. Proposal D sought to allow the sale of state bonds for park improvement.
