= Melanie Whelan =

American businesswoman

- Born: Baltimore, Maryland
- Education: Bryn Mawr School; Brown University
- Occupations: Former CEO of SoulCycle, managing director of Summit Partners

Melanie Whelan is an American businesswoman who is a managing director of the investment firm Summit Partners.

Whelan began her career working in corporate development for Virgin America and Starwood. She later became vice president of business development for Equinox Fitness. Whelan was the COO of SoulCycle from 2012 until 2015, when she became the company's CEO. She led the company's initial public offering (IPO). In 2020, Whelan joined investment firm Summit Partners as a managing director.
