= Patricia Holmes (politician) =

American politician (born c. 1959)

Member of the Michigan Senate from the 4th district
- In office November 29, 1994 – December 31, 1994
- Preceded by: David S. Holmes Jr.
- Succeeded by: Jackie Vaughn III

Personal details
- Born: c. 1959 (age 66–67)
- Party: Democratic

Patricia A. Holmes (born c. 1959) is a former member of the Michigan Senate.

Holmes was born around 1959.

Holmes was the daughter of Michigan state senator David S. Holmes Jr. Upon her father's death, she won a special election that allowed her to succeed her father. Holmes served in the Michigan Senate seat that represented the 4th district from November 29, 1994, to December 31, 1994. She did not win the Democratic primary for the same position that same year. During her time in the legislature, she lived in Detroit.

In 2016, Holmes attempted to regain the state senate seat she previously held in a special election. She was defeated in the Democratic primaries on August 2 by Ian Conyers.
