= Virgil Smith Jr. =

American politician (born 1979)

Member of the Michigan Senate from the 4th district
- In office January 1, 2011 – April 12, 2016
- Preceded by: Samuel "Buzz" Thomas
- Succeeded by: Ian Conyers

Member of the Michigan House of Representatives from the 7th district
- In office January 1, 2003 – January 1, 2009
- Preceded by: Hansen Clarke
- Succeeded by: Jimmy Womack

Personal details
- Born: December 18, 1979 (age 46) Detroit, Michigan, US
- Party: Democratic
- Parent: Virgil C. Smith (father)
- Education: Michigan State University (B.A.); Western Michigan University (M.A.)

Virgil K Smith (born December 18, 1979) is a Democratic former member of the Michigan House of Representatives and Michigan Senate. Smith previously represented the 4th Senate district, which is composed of Allen Park, Lincoln Park, Southgate and the north side of Detroit. From 2003 to 2008, Smith represented State House district 7, comprising the northern tier of Detroit.

== Personal life ==
Smith is the son of Third Judicial Circuit of Michigan of retired Chief Judge and former Michigan State Senator Virgil C. Smith. In 2000, he was arrested for possessing alcohol whilst underage.

In 2004, Smith's license was revoked after facing two different alcohol-related offenses. It was reinstated in 2008. In 2010, he was pulled over on allegations he had been driving under the influence but was not charged.

On May 6, 2009, Smith married Anistia Thomas. Smith filed for divorce in July 2009 and Thomas counter-sued for an annulment. Smith consented and it was granted on October 6, 2009. In May, 2015, Smith was charged with felonious assault, domestic violence, malicious destruction of property and felony firearm charges after he shot Thomas's car. Thomas was granted a Personal Protection Order against Smith as a result of the incident. In 2016, Smith plead guilty to the malicious destruction of personal property, a felony, and was sentenced to ten months in prison.

== Education ==
Smith did his undergraduate studies at Michigan State University earning a degree in political science. He received his master's degree in public administration from Western Michigan University.

== Political career ==
=== 2002 House election ===
Smith won the Democratic primary in 2002 against former state senator Henry Stallings II.

=== State Senate ===
In 2010, Smith was elected to the Michigan Senate, winning against. George Cushingberry. He ran again in 2016 against Rashida Tlaib, and was re-elected. In 2015, Smith pled guilty to malicious destruction of personal property after he shot at his ex-wife's car and resigned from his seat in the senate. The plea deal initially required Smith to resign senate seat and not run for public office for five years, but the county circuit overseeing the case judged that such a clause would violate the state constitution.

=== 2017 Detroit City Council election ===
Smith ran for the Detroit City Council in 2017. The Wayne County prosecutor appealed the ruling vacating part of his plea deal, but the appeal was dismissed in April 2017. Smith finished second in the August primary, where he faced Roy McCalister Jr. on the general election ballot. Smith went on to lose the general election to McCalister.

== See also ==
- Michigan House of Representatives
- Michigan Senate
- Michigan Democratic Party
