= Ruth Zukerman =

American businessperson

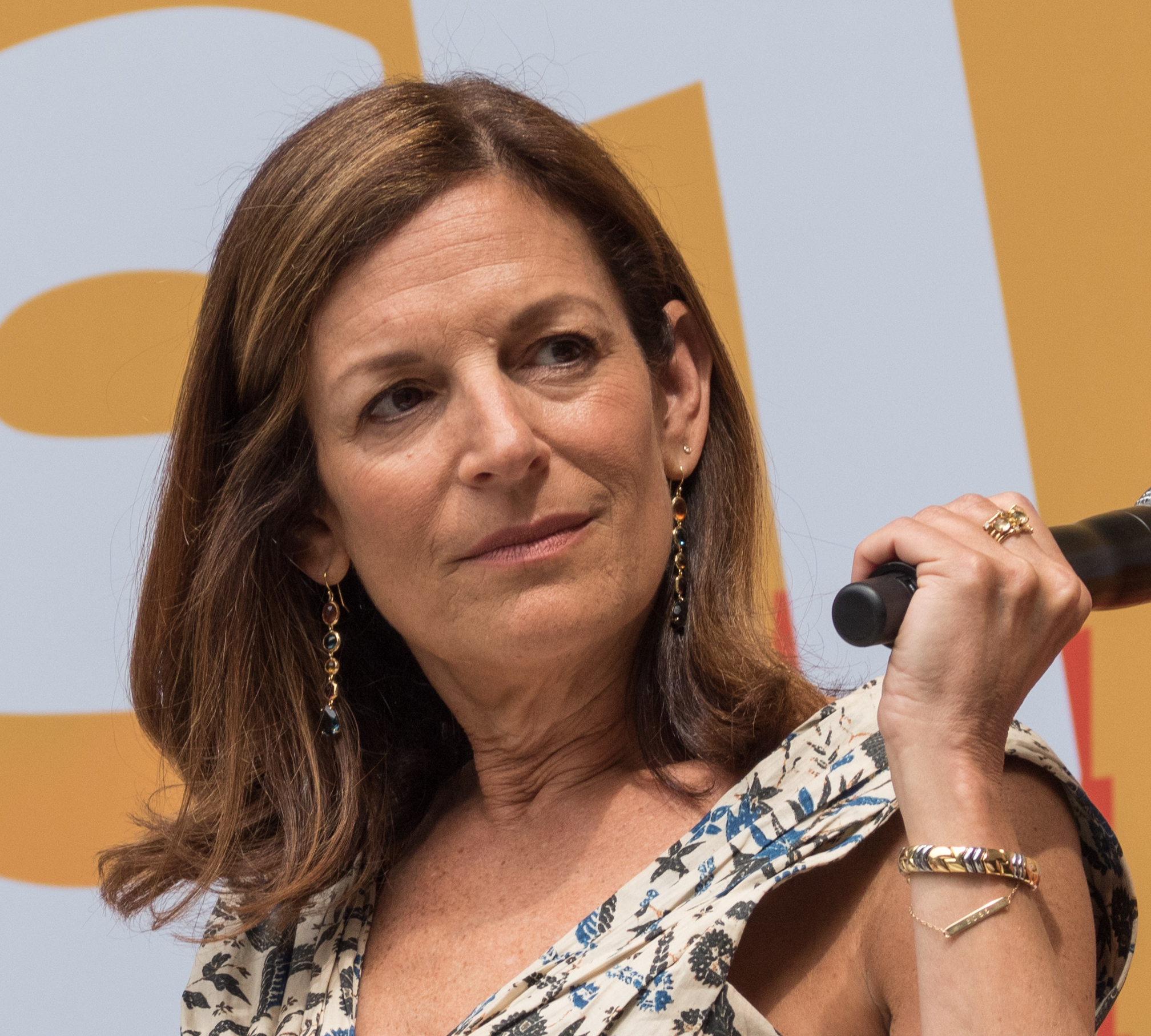
- Zukerman at Ozy Fest in July 2018
- Education: Mount Holyoke College
- Occupations: Entrepreneur, Author
- Organization(s): Co-founder of SoulCycle and Flywheel Sports

Ruth Zukerman is co-founder of indoor cycling businesses SoulCycle and Flywheel Sports.

== Early life ==
Zukerman grew up in Roslyn, New York to a family of Polish, Russian, and German-Jewish heritage. Her father was a physician and her mother a psychotherapist. In the early 1980s, she got a job teaching aerobics on the Upper West Side of Manhattan after teaching classes there for a few months.

== SoulCycle ==
Elizabeth Cutler, who was a member of the club where Zukerman was an instructor, proposed opening a boutique spin studio based on her method of teaching. Julie Rice, also one of her riders and a friend, became the third co-founder upon Zukerman's suggestion. SoulCycle opened its first studio in 2006 on Manhattan's Upper West Side, pioneering the studio “pay per class” structure, which is now the predominant group fitness model.

Zukerman left SoulCycle in 2009. While she has been private about the reasoning behind her departure, she said she learned a valuable lesson from it. “Whenever you’re going into a business partnership with anybody, make sure you’re legally protected,” she said. “I did not do that and it cost me a lot.”

== Flywheel Sports ==
In 2009, Zukerman left SoulCycle to start Flywheel Sports with Jay Galluzzo and David Seldin. Flywheel opened in 2010. At Flywheel, rider metrics were added to the spin experience trough something called a “TorqBoard”, which measures rider resistance, cadence, and current and overall power output. Flywheel was sued by Peloton in September 2018 under the accusation that the company had copied Peloton's at-home bike and leaderboard technology. The decision in the case rendered Flywheel's at-home bikes unusable. In December 2018, Zukerman left Flywheel Sports. In 2020, Flywheel Sports filed for bankruptcy due to economic strains caused by the coronavirus pandemic and the two-year legal battle with Peloton over patent infringement.
