= Planet Fitness =

American fitness center franchise

Planet Fitness, Inc.

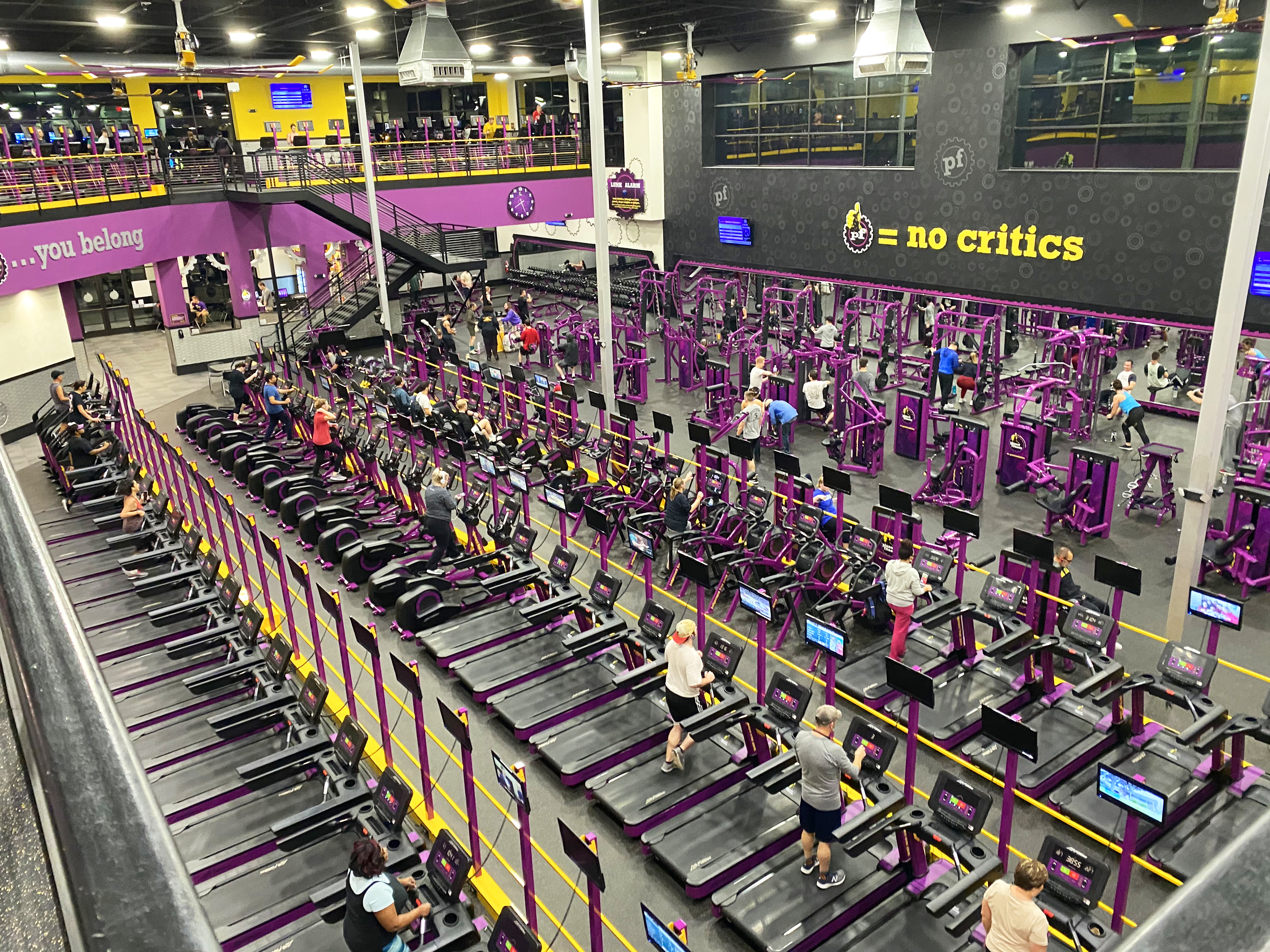
- A Planet Fitness location in Cincinnati, Ohio
- Trade name: Planet Fitness
- Type: Public
- Traded as: NYSE: PLNT (Class A); S&P 400 component
- Industry: Fitness
- Founded: 1992; 34 years ago
- Founders: Michael Grondahl; Marc Grondahl; Rick Berks
- Headquarters: Hampton, New Hampshire, U.S.
- Number of locations: 2,715 (2025)
- Area served: North and Central America; Spain, Australia
- Key people: Colleen Keating (CEO)
- Revenue: ▲US$1.18 billion (2024)
- Operating income: ▲US$324 million (2024)
- Net income: ▲US$174 million (2024)
- Total assets: ▲US$3.07 billion (2024)
- Total equity: ▼US$−215 million (2024)
- Number of employees: 3,806 (2024)
- Website: planetfitness.com

Planet Fitness, Inc. is an American international franchisor and operator of fitness centers based in Hampton, New Hampshire. The company has around 2,715 clubs, making it one of the largest fitness club franchises by number of members and locations. The franchise has locations in the United States, Canada, Panama, Mexico, Spain and Australia. Planet Fitness markets itself as a "Judgement Free Zone" aimed at casual and first-time gym users, while discouraging behavior it associates with intimidating gym culture, which it characterizes as "lunk" behavior.

== History ==
In 1992, Planet Fitness founders Michael and Marc Grondahl acquired a struggling Gold's Gym franchise in Dover, New Hampshire. They eventually closed that original location, opened a gym called Coastal Fitness, and brought on a third partner, Chris Rondeau. In 2002, they purchased the rights to the name Planet Fitness from Rick Berks and renamed their franchise.

Berks had started his own Planet Fitness gym in 1993 in Sunrise, Florida, and eventually expanded it to three clubs, along with a Gold's Gym franchise. The company name was derived from his daughter's school project, which was titled "Fitness Planet."

In the fall of 2013, TSG Consumer Partners LLC became an equity partner in the Planet Fitness franchise. Michael Grondahl, co-founder of Planet Fitness stepped down as CEO, and was succeeded by Chris Rondeau. The company went public on August 6, 2015. In 2023, Rondeau left the company. Colleen Keating became CEO in 2024.

== Marketing ==
Planet Fitness' founding business model focused on the needs of occasional or first-time health club members, rather than more experienced members. In 1999 Planet Fitness launched 'Pizza Monday' which offered free pizza on the first Monday night of each month, this ended in 2020. Since 2024, however, the company has broadened its appeal to include more experienced gym goers by adding equipment and amenities to meet their needs, emphasizing that all levels of fitness are welcome.

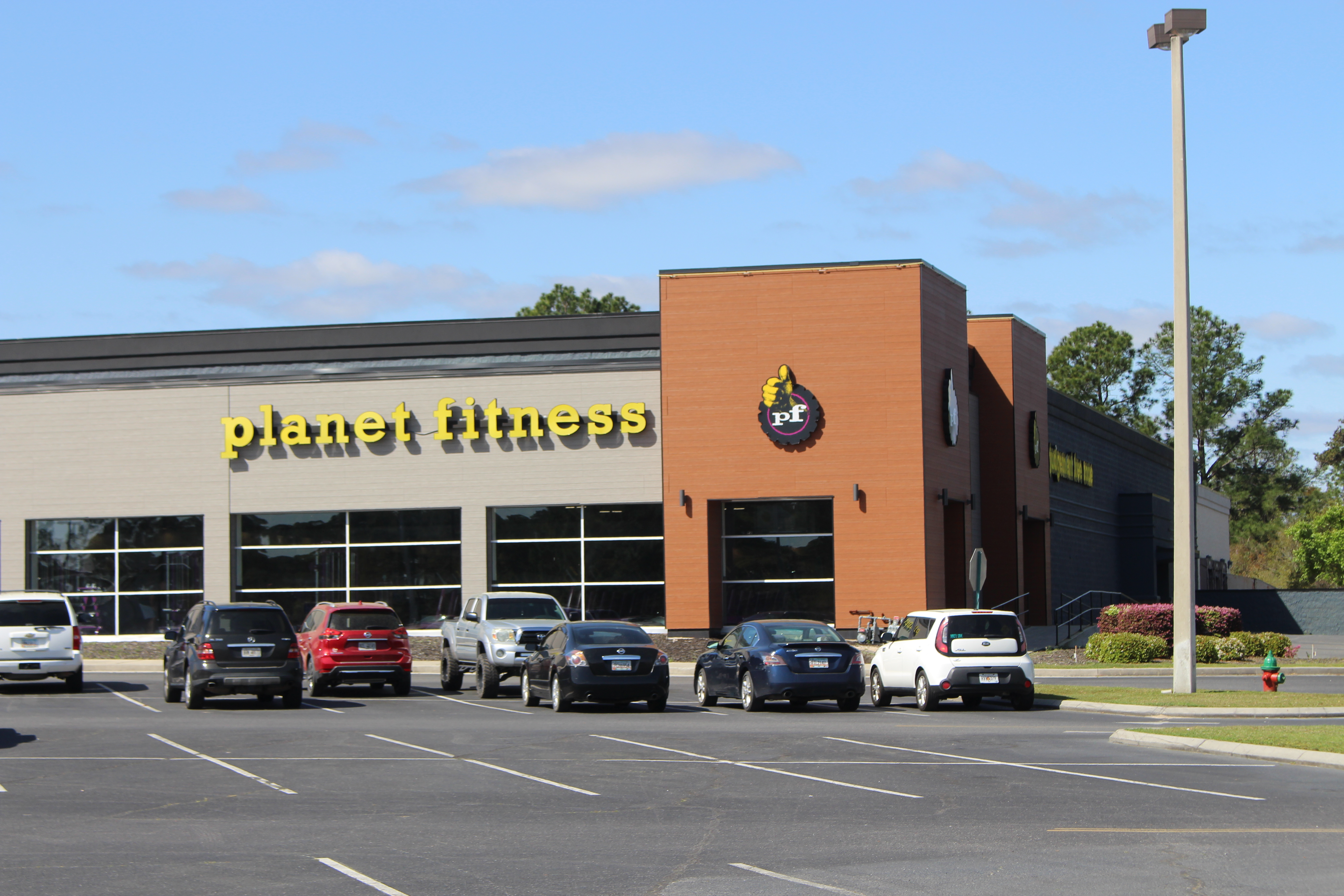
A Planet Fitness location in Waycross, Georgia in 2021

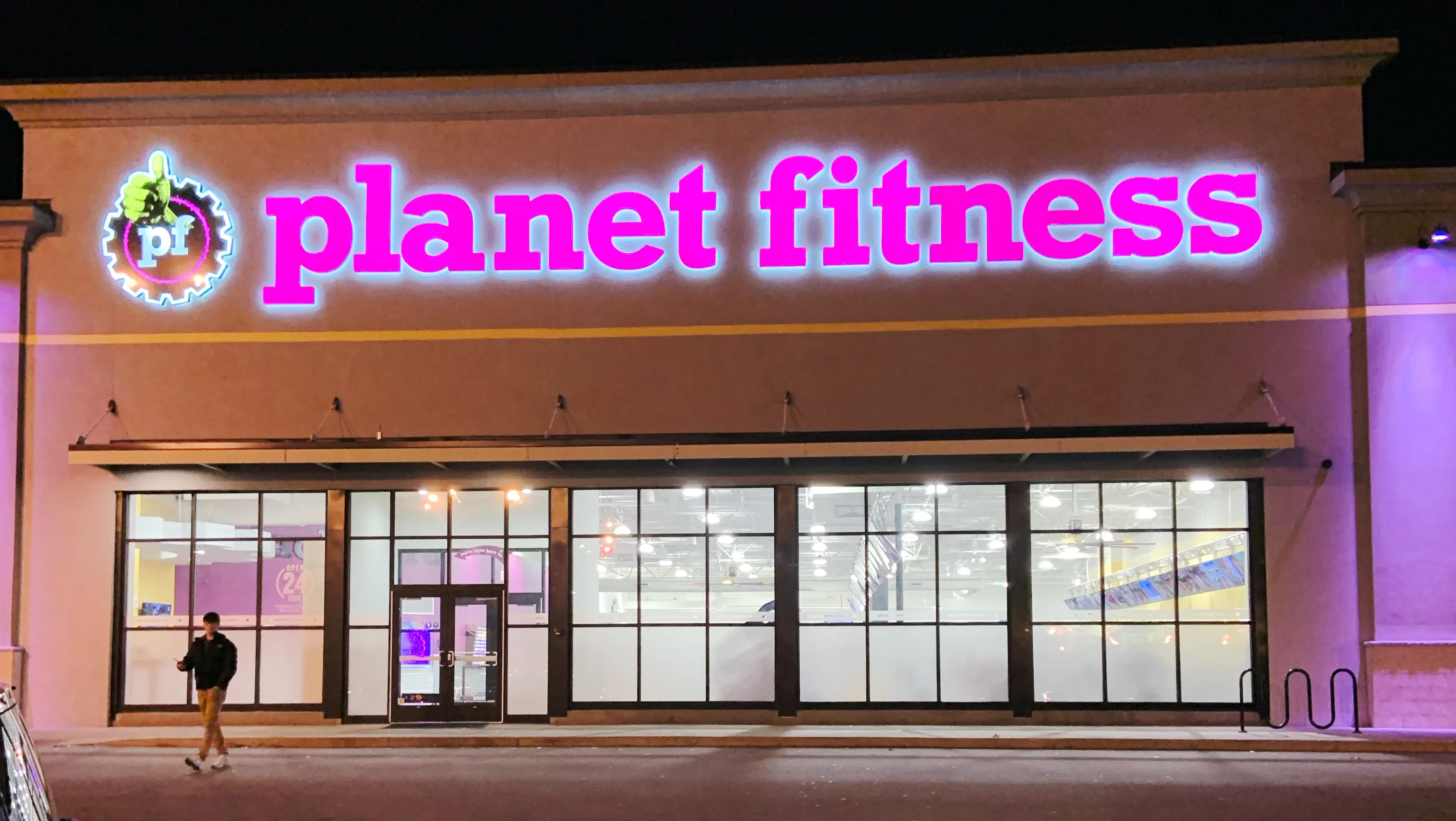
Planet Fitness in Onalaska, Wisconsin

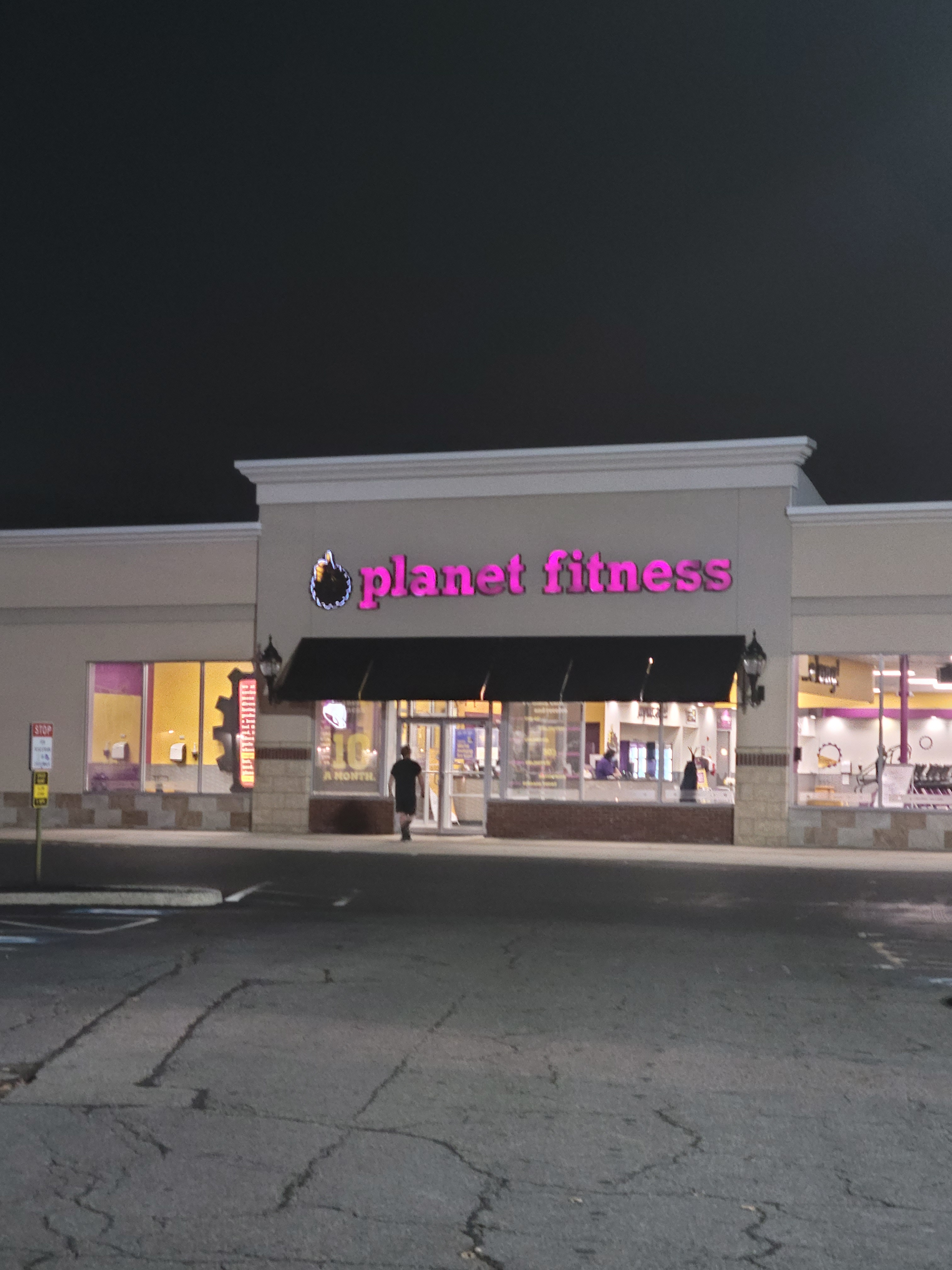
A Planet Fitness in Somerset, New Jersey

== Criticism ==
A 2010 article in Men's Health criticized Planet Fitness for prohibiting certain weightlifting exercises—such as deadlifts and clean-and-jerks—that many experts believe are highly effective. Planet Fitness gyms have a "lunk alarm," a loud siren and rotating light that may be used when a weightlifter grunts too loudly or drops weights. This has alienated some gym goers.

== COVID-19 shutdown ==
In March 2020, as the COVID-19 lockdown measures took effect, the company was criticized for debiting its customers' membership dues for that month, despite the nationwide closure of its facilities due to the onset of the pandemic. The Wall Street Journal reported that the company said it acted too late to cancel the March automatic payments and would reimburse customers. By March 23, 2020, the company ceased charging its customers monthly dues for as long as the clubs remained closed.

Following the closure of its gyms on March 18, 2020, Planet Fitness began offering free online workout classes; company officers announced they would take a cut in salary and that senior managers would have their pay reduced; board members waived their annual retainers. Despite the loss of revenue, once the lockdown lifted, the company was able to reopen all of its gyms. However, many clubs have yet to restore gym hours to 24-7 as they were prior to the COVID-19 shutdown.

== Outreach ==
Beginning in February 2025, Planet Fitness offered free "Black Card" memberships to firefighters in the Greater Los Angeles area to assist in their personal fitness and health recovery following their efforts combatting the January 2025 Southern California wildfires.

In 2019, Planet Fitness began offering high-school students free June-August memberships, allowing student athletes to work out over the summer. In May 2025, Planet Fitness announced that its High School Summer Pass program had been taken up by 10 million students since its inception.

Beginning in 2016, the company has partnered with the Boys & Girls Clubs of America offering college scholarships and supported training programs and other local community-based projects.

== See also ==
- Blink Fitness
- 24 Hour Fitness
- Equinox Group
- Life Time Fitness
- Town Sports International Holdings
