= Charline White =

American politician (1920–1959)

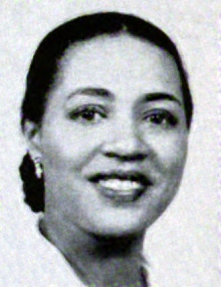

Member of the Michigan House of Representatives from the Wayne County 1st district
- In office January 1, 1951 – December 31, 1955

Member of the Michigan House of Representatives from the Wayne County 11th district
- In office January 1, 1955 – September 7, 1959

Personal details
- Born: September 1, 1920 Atlanta, Georgia
- Died: September 7, 1959 (aged 39) Detroit, Michigan
- Party: Democratic
- Spouse: LeRoy G. White (m. 1947; div. 1953)
- Education: Cass Technical High School; Poro College; Wayne State University

Charline White (September 1, 1920 – September 7, 1959) was the first African-American woman to be elected to the Michigan Legislature. In 1952, she was re-elected.

== Early life ==
White was born in Atlanta, Georgia on September 1, 1920. Sometime in 1923 she moved to Detroit, Michigan. White graduated from Cass Technical High School and attended both Wayne State University and Poro College.

== Personal life ==
Charline White married LeRoy G. White around 1947. The two divorced in 1953.

== Career ==
White ran both an advertising business and a floral business. In 1950, White was elected to the Michigan House of Representatives from Wayne County 1st District. She was sworn in for the first time on January 3, 1951. White was a member of the Democratic party. She was re-elected to represent Wayne County 1st District until November 2, 1954, when she was elected to represent Wayne County 11th District. She was sworn in for the first time for this position on January 12, 1955. She would win re-election two more time before her death on September 7, 1959. White died in office on September 7, 1959. Her vacancy was filled by David S. Holmes Jr.

== See also ==
- African-American officeholders (1900–1959)
