= SoulCycle =

American fitness company

SoulCycle Inc.

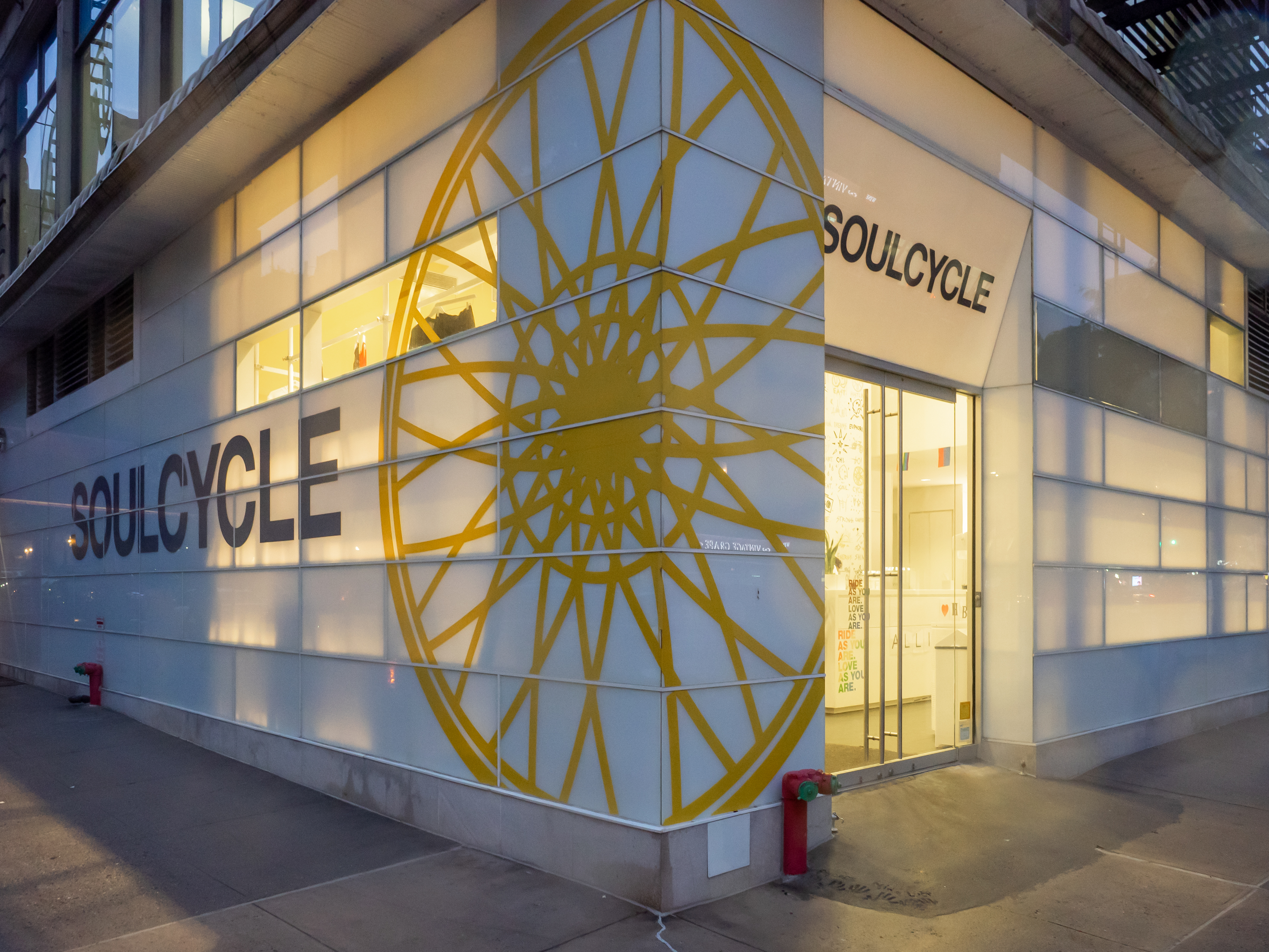
- Front entrance to a Manhattan SoulCycle studio
- Type: Subsidiary
- Industry: Physical fitness
- Founded: 2006; 20 years ago
- Founders: Elizabeth Cutler; Julie Rice; Ruth Zukerman
- Headquarters: New York City
- Number of locations: 99 (2020); U.S. locations: 57 (2026)
- Key people: Evelyn Webster (CEO)
- Products: Exercise equipment
- Services: Indoor cycling and spinning classes
- Number of employees: 1,500 (2016)
- Parent: Equinox Group
- Website: soul-cycle.com

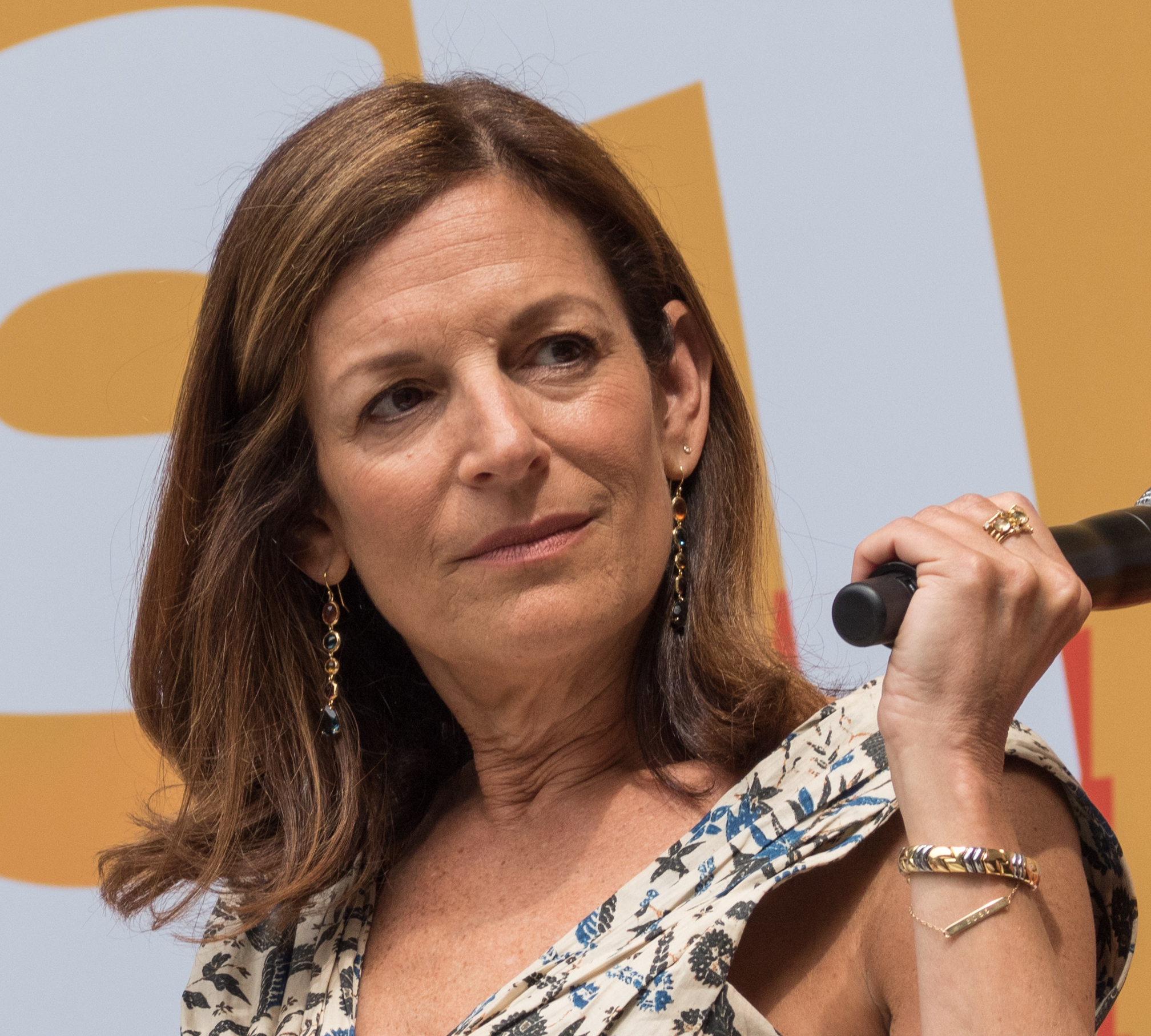
Ruth Zukerman in July 2018

SoulCycle Inc. is a fitness company owned by Equinox Group which offers indoor cycling and spinning workout classes. It was founded in 2006, and has operations in the United States and the United Kingdom. In early 2020, before the COVID-19 pandemic, it operated 99 studios. The company is headquartered in the West Village in Manhattan, New York City.

== Classes ==
Most SoulCycle classes are 45 minute cycling classes that often include musical themes and choreography. Some classes, SoulSurvivor, are 60 minute classes. SoulCycle class themes include musical genres, new album releases, and movie soundtracks.

== History ==
Ruth Zukerman began teaching spin classes in Manhattan in 1996. In 2006, she introduced her clients Elizabeth Cutler, a real estate agent, and Julie Rice, a talent manager for Benny Medina's Handprint Entertainment, to each other over lunch, where the three women decided to start the brand that would become SoulCycle.

SoulCycle opened its first studio in 2006 on the Upper West Side in Manhattan, and later expanded to several other locations in Manhattan. In 2009, Zukerman left SoulCycle. In 2010, with Jay Galuzzo and David Seldin, she founded Flywheel Sports, a competitor to SoulCycle.

In 2011, The Related Companies's Equinox Group acquired a majority stake in SoulCycle.

In July 2015, SoulCycle filed to raise $100 million in an initial public offering at a valuation of around $900 million. The company paused the process in 2016. In a May 2018 filing with the U.S. Securities and Exchange Commission the IPO was cancelled, citing "market conditions."

In March 2017, SoulCycle opened its first studio outside of the United States, in Toronto, and the next year a second studio in Toronto and one in Vancouver.

In October 2017, the company opened a non-cycling-based studio, SoulAnnex, in Manhattan's Flatiron District. The studio incorporated elements of yoga and strength training. In February 2018, the studio permanently closed after a class action lawsuit by local residents due to noise pollution.

In June 2018, SoulCycle created a media division. In July 2018, SoulCycle and Equinox launched a talent agency to represent their fitness instructors, with William Morris Endeavor in an advisory role.

On November 26, 2019, Melanie Whelan stepped down as CEO.

In March 2020, SoulCycle closed all of its then 99 studios due to the COVID-19 pandemic. As a result of accelerated consumer demand for at-home fitness options, the company lost market share to Peloton, a firm offering stationary bikes used to stream at-home spin classes.

While SoulCycle had announced a $2,500 bike for purchase in August 2019 in partnership with Variis, it only began shipping in May 2020, six months later than initially planned. It was available across the United States in October 2020. In 2020 was renamed Equinox+ and began to offer added exercise methods via the Equinox+ app.

Due to the COVID-19 pandemic, in March 2020, SoulCycle enacted furloughs and pay cuts for many employees and in April 2020, it began laying off 5%-10% of its staff. In July 2020, the company closed its King Street studio in Toronto. In an email sent to local customers, SoulCycle cited pandemic-related financial difficulties as reasons for the location's abrupt closure. Additional studios that were permanently closed after the COVID shutdowns in 2021 include San Jose, San Mateo, Calabasas, Culver City, Malibu, Union Square, W60th, Scarsdale, Memorial, and Beacon Hill.

In August 2019, reports that SoulCycle investor and former majority owner Stephen M. Ross would be hosting a planned fundraiser for the Donald Trump 2020 presidential campaign prompted a spokesperson to distance the company from the event. It also led to boycott threats.

In November 2020, SoulCycle employees and customers alleged that several of the company's instructors had made racist and homophobic remarks and fat shaming comments toward other staff and customers, and that the company refused to take action.

In December 2020, Evelyn Webster was named chief executive officer of the company.

In 2022, the company closed its Toronto studio, which was at the time its last Canadian location.

== Exercise physiology ==
In a 2011 article in the Los Angeles Times, certified strength and conditioning specialist James Fell approved of the company's theatrical approach to entertain and motivate its customers, saying he encourages "the importance of finding an exercise you love and embracing it with fervor." However, Fell gave the company "a failing grade for exercise physiology and biomechanics" and pointed out that the co-founders do not have certification in any type of exercise.

== Popular culture ==
SoulCycle was prominently featured in the 2018 film I Feel Pretty, and briefly mentioned in The Big Bang Theory's episode, The Decision Reverberation (S12, E20, 16:36 minutes).
