= Marshall Bullock =

American politician

Member of the Michigan Senate from the 4th district
- In office January 1, 2019 – January 1, 2023
- Preceded by: Ian Conyers
- Succeeded by: Darrin Camilleri

Personal details
- Born: Marshall Laverne Bullock II
- Party: Democratic
- Spouse: Angela
- Children: 3
- Education: University of Phoenix (BA)
- Website: Campaign website

Marshall Laverne Bullock II is an American politician serving as a Democratic member of the Michigan State Board of Education. He previously served in the Michigan Senate from 2019 to 2023 and served as the City of Detroit Director of Government Affairs after leaving the Senate.

Bullock was born and raised in Detroit, and is a member of Omega Psi Phi and an Eagle Scout. He attended Detroit Public Schools and the University of Phoenix, graduating with a Bachelor of Arts in Human Services. Bullock has worked in public health and juvenile justice, and served in the Detroit Mayor's Department of Neighborhoods from 2014 to 2016, working directly with constituents to address concerns. Bullock advanced to the Director of Community and Political Affairs, a position he held until his election to the State Senate.

In the 2018 Michigan Senate election, Bullock won by a wide margin against his Republican opponent, Angela Savino. In office, he served as Chair of the Michigan Legislative Black Caucus.

Michigan's legislative maps were redrawn in 2021 with data from the 2020 Census, and Bullock's district changed substantially. Bullock and fellow Michigan Senator Mallory McMorrow were drawn into the same district, District 8. Bullock's new district represented only 15% of the population of his former district, to McMorrow's 40%. McMorrow won the primary by a wide margin.

After leaving the Michigan Senate in 2023, Bullock returned to the administration of Detroit mayor Mike Duggan as Director of Government Affairs. In this position, he advocates for the city's interests at the state and federal levels.
