= Pat Walsh (hurler) =

Irish hurler

Personal information
- Native name: Pádraig Breathnach (Irish)
- Born: 14 June 1963 (age 63) Windgap, County Kilkenny, Ireland
- Occupation: Carpenter
- Height: 5 ft 11 in (180 cm)

Sport
- Sport: Hurling
- Position: Centre-forward
Club
- Years: Club
- Windgap
Club titles
- Cork titles: 0
Inter-county
- Years: County
- 1984–1987: Kilkenny
Inter-county titles
- Leinster titles: 2
- All-Irelands: 0
- NHL: 1
- All Stars: 0

Patrick Walsh (born 14 June 1963) is an Irish retired hurler. At club level, he played with Windgap and at inter-county level with the Kilkenny senior hurling team.

== Career ==
Walsh began his club hurling career at juvenile and underage levels with Windgap. He was centre-back on the club's junior team that beat Danesfort by 1–11 to 2–01 to win the Kilkenny JHC title in 1986.

At inter-county level with Kilkenny, Walsh won two All-Ireland medals in the space of a few weeks in 1984, after lining out for the successful under-21 and junior teams. He also made his senior team debut that year and was part of Kilkenny's four-point 1984 Oireachtas Cup final defeat of Cork.

Walsh remained a member of the senior team's extended panel for the next few seasons. He won a National Hurling League title in 1986, before later claiming successive Leinster SHC medals. Walsh lined out at right corner-forward in Kilkenny's 1–12 to 0–09 defeat by Galway in the 1987 All-Ireland SHC final. He ended his inter-county career with a second All-Ireland JHC success in 1990.

== Honours ==
Windgap

- Kilkenny Junior Hurling Championship: 1986

Kilkenny

- Leinster Senior Hurling Championship: 1986, 1987
- National Hurling League: 1985–86
- Oireachtas Cup: 1984
- All-Ireland Junior Hurling Championship: 1984, 1990
- Leinster Junior Hurling Championship: 1984, 1990
- All-Ireland Under-21 Hurling Championship: 1984
- Leinster Under-21 Hurling Championship: 1984
