= Ian Conyers =

American politician (born 1988)

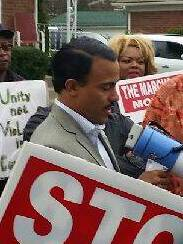
- Conyers in 2016

Member of the Michigan Senate from the 4th district
- In office November 23, 2016 – January 1, 2019
- Preceded by: Virgil Smith Jr.
- Succeeded by: Marshall Bullock

Personal details
- Born: Ian Kyle Conyers; October 28, 1988 (age 37) Lansing, Michigan, U.S.
- Party: Democratic
- Relatives: John Conyers (grand-uncle)
- Education: Georgetown University (BA, MA)

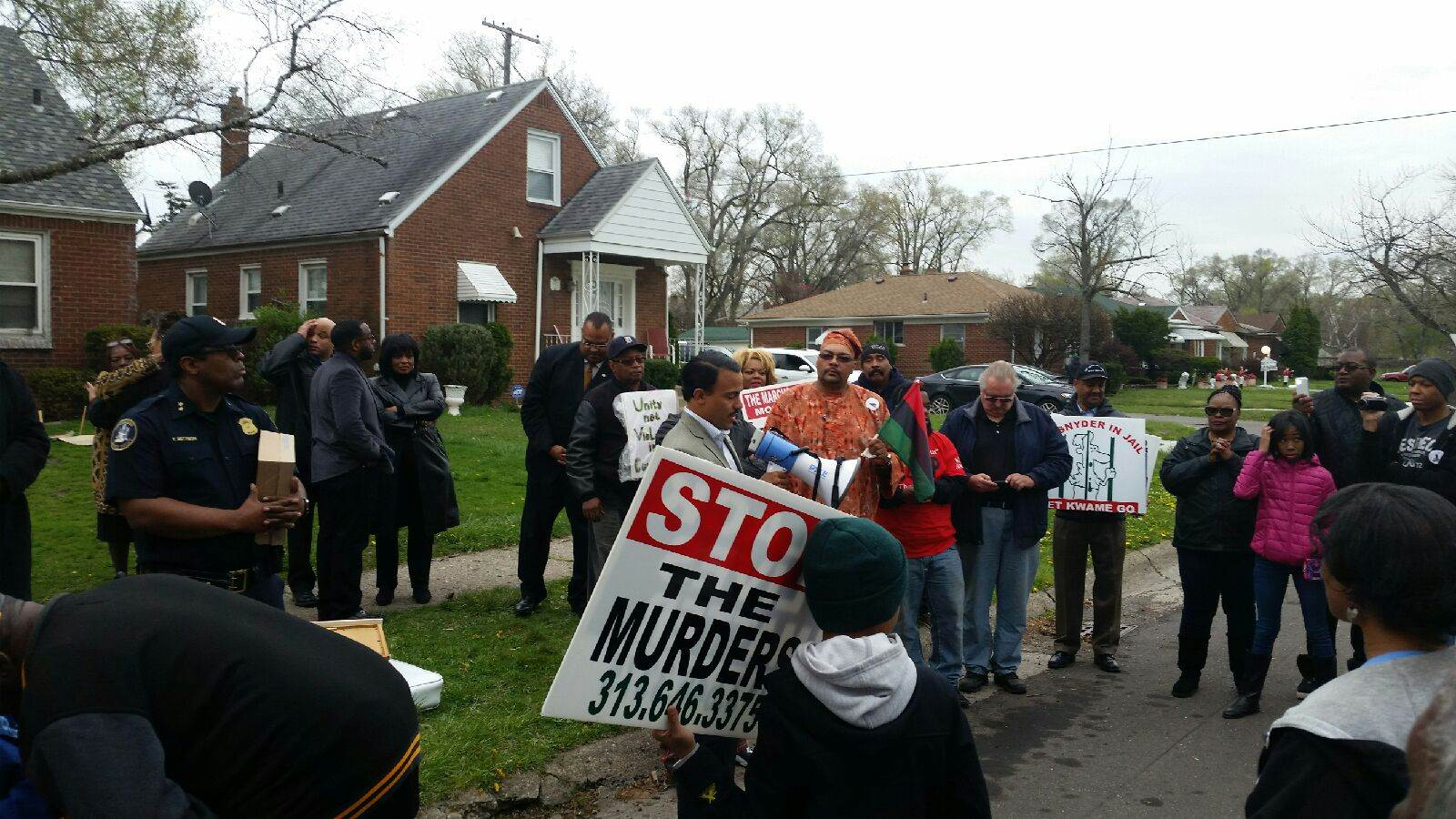
Conyers participating in peace rally to address gun violence in the City of Detroit. March 2016

Ian Kyle Conyers (born October 28, 1988) is an American politician and businessman who represented the 4th District of Michigan in the Michigan Senate for one term.

Conyers sat on the Economic Development & International Investment, Energy & Technology, and Banking & Financial Services Committees in the State Senate. He was minority vice chair of the Transportation Committee.

== Early life and education ==
Conyers was born in 1988 and raised in East Lansing, Michigan. His father's family has lived there since his great-grandfather, John Conyers Sr. moved there from rural Georgia as part of the Great Migration. His grandfather, William Conyers, was the younger brother of Congressman John Conyers Jr., who retired in 2017 after setting a record for longevity in Congress.

Ian Conyers attended University of Detroit Jesuit High School. He graduated from Georgetown University, where he obtained a B.A. in government. While at Georgetown, Conyers played football and joined the Kappa Chi chapter of Kappa Alpha Psi fraternity. Conyers also earned a master's degree in urban and regional planning from Georgetown. While in Washington, DC, he worked on the Anacostia waterfront redevelopment, a multi-year, public-private effort.

== Political career ==
=== 2016 election ===
On January 27, 2016, Conyers filed to run in the Democratic Party primary election for Michigan's 3rd State House District.

On April 13, 2016, Conyers filed to run in the Democratic primary election to fill the remainder of the term for the vacancy in Michigan's 4th State Senate District. Candidates were running to replace Virgil Smith Jr., who had resigned from office amid a domestic violence scandal. In the primary, Conyers won a nine-candidate race with 34.52% of the vote. In the General Election, Conyers defeated Republican Keith Franklin with 76.55% of the vote. He entered office in November 2016 for the remainder of the term; at 28 years of age, he was the youngest state senator in Michigan's history to that date.

Conyers was assigned to the Economic Development & International Investment, Energy & Technology, and Banking & Financial Services committees in the State Senate. He served as minority vice chair of the Transportation Committee. His term ended December 31, 2018.

=== 2018 Congressional special election ===
In late 2017 his great-uncle, Congressman John Conyers Jr., was the subject of several allegations of sexual harassment by former staffers. In November, the House Ethics Committee initiated an investigation into the allegations and John resigned on December 5, 2017. He endorsed his son, John Conyers III, as a potential successor. Ian Conyers announced his intention to run for the seat on the same day, saying that John had encouraged him to run privately. Conyers later tweeted, then deleted, pictures of John Conyers III, then underage, with alcohol. Conyers added the caption asking the media to take "a thorough look at all candidates". On January 19, 2018, Ian Conyers formally announced his candidacy for the 13th Congressional District vacancy.

After Republican Governor Rick Snyder held the seat vacant for over one year the election was announced as a double primary in which one contest was to finish the unexpired term of John Conyers Jr. and a second concurrent election was to hold the office from 2018 until 2020. Detroit city council president Brenda Jones won the partial election, Rashida Tlaib narrowly won the full term by 800 votes.
