= William J. Moody =

American judge and politician

Member of the Michigan Senate from the 4th district
- In office November 2, 1835 – January 1, 1837
- In office January 2, 1843 – January 5, 1845

William Jackson Moody (1796 – likely 1855 or 1856) was an American lawyer, judge, and politician. He was active in the U.S. states of New York and Michigan, and served multiple terms in the Michigan Senate.

== Biography ==
William Jackson Moody was born in Unity, New Hampshire, in 1796, to Israel Moody and Rebecca Jackson. He lost his left arm fighting in the War of 1812.

He graduated Phi Beta Kappa from Dartmouth College in 1821 and studied law alongside William H. Seward under Elijah Miller, who became Seward's father-in-law. In 1825, he was a judge in Orleans County, New York. He lived in Penfield, New York, before moving to Detroit in 1833.

In 1830, Moody was among a group of real estate speculators who purchased land surrounding the claim of Russell Blackman, one of the co-founders of Jackson, Michigan. Blackman had planned to purchase the additional land, but was away raising money at the time the so-called "squatter act" came into effect on January 1, which allowed Moody and the others to file a claim and have two years to pay for the land. As a result, they were able to force Blackman to work with them as they developed the new town.

Moody was admitted as an attorney in the Jackson County, Michigan, circuit court in December 1834, was named district attorney in 1835, and was serving as a judge in 1837. Moody was a Democrat, and was elected to the Michigan Senate from the 4th District in its first term, and served from 1835 to 1837. He was re-elected twice more later in his career and served in the senate in 1843 and 1844. In 1842, he served as a township supervisor.

He moved to Racine, Wisconsin, where he was again a judge. Moody and his wife died of cholera on the same day, most likely in 1855 or 1856.

Moody's son, W. J. Moody, attended the University of Michigan Medical School and was a physician in Bremer County, Iowa.
