= Virgil C. Smith =

American politician (1947–2025)

The Honorable Virgil C. Smith

Judge of the Michigan 3rd Circuit Court
- In office May 19, 2004 – December 31, 2018
- Appointed by: Jennifer Granholm
- Preceded by: Kaye Tertzag

Member of the Michigan Senate from the 2nd district
- In office March 1988 – December 31, 2000
- Preceded by: Basil W. Brown
- Succeeded by: Martha G. Scott

Member of the Michigan House of Representatives from the 10th district
- In office January 1, 1977 – March 1988
- Preceded by: Michael Novak
- Succeeded by: Ted Wallace

Personal details
- Born: July 4, 1947 Detroit, Michigan, U.S.
- Died: June 23, 2025 (aged 77) Detroit, Michigan, U.S.
- Spouse: Elizabeth
- Children: 4, including Virgil Smith Jr.
- Education: Michigan State University; Wayne State University Law School

Virgil Clark Smith (July 4, 1947 – June 23, 2025) was an American politician and judge. He served as judge of the 3rd Circuit Court in Wayne County, Michigan from 2004 to 2018, having been appointed to fill a vacancy in the court by Michigan Governor Jennifer Granholm. Smith previously served as a member of the Michigan House of Representatives and as a Michigan state senator. He represented a district in Detroit.

== Life and career ==
Smith earned his bachelor's degree from Michigan State University and had a Juris Doctor degree from Wayne State University.

Smith had served on the judiciary committee of the state house in 1980–1981. He was elected to the Michigan State Senate in 1988 and became the Democratic floor leader in 1995. Smith was the first African-American Michigan Senate floor leader. In 1992, Smith made an unsuccessful run for the office of Wayne County Prosecutor. Since the state senators serve for four years, Smith was not up for re-election in that year. He was first elected to the state senate in a special election. He resigned to take a job with the Wayne County Prosecutors office in 2001 and remained in that job until he was appointed to the Circuit Court in 2004.

On January 1, 2009, Smith became the chief judge of the 3rd Circuit.

Smith was married to Elizabeth and had four children. Among these are Virgil Smith, Jr., who also served in the Michigan Senate and House of Representatives.

His wife, Elizabeth, is the daughter of the youngest of Malcolm X's brothers, Robert Little. Smith died from renal failure and chronic obstructive pulmonary disease, on June 23, 2025, at the age of 77.

== Sources ==
- Announcement of Smith's appointment to court
- Michigan Citizen article on Smith
