= David S. Holmes Jr. =

American politician (1914–1994)

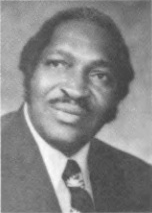

Member of the Michigan Senate from the 4th district
- In office March 1974 – May 21, 1994
- Preceded by: Coleman Young
- Succeeded by: Patricia Holmes

Member of the Michigan House of Representatives
- In office 1959 – March 1974
- Preceded by: Charline White
- Succeeded by: Barbara-Rose Collins
- Constituency: Wayne County 11th district (1959–1964); 10th district (1965–1972); 21st district (1973–1974)

Personal details
- Born: August 11, 1914 Covington, Kentucky, U.S.
- Died: May 21, 1994 (aged 79)
- Party: Democratic
- Spouse: Avis
- Education: Virginia State College
- Occupation: Politician

David S. Holmes Jr. (August 11, 1914 – May 21, 1994) was a member of both houses of the Michigan Legislature between 1959 and his death in 1994.

A native of Kentucky, Holmes graduated from Virginia State College and studied at the University of Michigan. He was an aide with the UAW/AFL-CIO. Holmes was elected to the Michigan House of Representatives to fill a vacancy caused by the death of Charline White in 1959. When Coleman Young was elected Mayor of Detroit and resigned from the Michigan Senate, Holmes won election to fill the seat and moved from the House to the Senate in March 1974 where he served for two decades until his death. On his passing, his daughter Patricia was elected in November 1994 to fill the seat for the remaining month of session.

Holmes was a delegate to the 1968 and 1988 Democratic National Conventions. The Holmes Act was legislated into Michigan Law in 1978 to protect youth from harsh penalties and sentencing for felony criminal offenses; it has been amended as the Holmes Youthful Training Act from the ages of 17 to 26.
