= Silas Finch =

American politician

Member of the Michigan Senate from the 4th district
- In office November 2, 1835 – January 1, 1837

Silas Finch was an American businessman and politician. He served in the Michigan Senate during its first session following Michigan's statehood.

== Biography ==
There are few details available on Finch's life. He came to the newly-founded village of Saline, Michigan, from New York, prior to 1832. He began a mercantile business, selling items out of Saline founder Orange Risdon's parlor. In 1832, he built the first retail store in Saline, on the corner of Chicago and Adrian Streets. Finch was president of the Bank of Saline, organized on September 2, 1837; by the following September, the bank had failed.

He was elected to the Michigan Senate for its first term, serving from 1835 to 1837.

Finch died sometime before October 1842.
