= Patrick Walsh (investor) =

American investor

- Born: December 26, 1975 (age 50); San Diego, California, U.S.
- Education: Boston College (BA in Accounting)
- Occupations: Entrepreneur, investor

Patrick Walsh (born December 26, 1975) is an American entrepreneur and investor. He is the founder and CEO of PW Partners, LLC, an investment management firm.

== Early life and education ==
Walsh was born in San Diego, California, to a US Navy officer and a teacher. He initially attended Wesleyan University, studying Economics and participating as a dual-sport athlete in football and baseball. After an injury ended his sports career, he transferred to Boston College and graduated with a degree in accounting in 1998. After graduation, he earned the Chartered Financial Analyst designation. He completed Columbia University's Executive Value Investing Program in 2004.

== Career ==
Walsh worked from 1998 to 2004 at Prudential Capital Group and Prudential Securities in real estate private equity and equity research; from 2004 to 2008 at Deutsche Bank as an investment banker and at Oak Street Capital, a private hedge fund based in Chicago from 2008 to 2011.

In 2012, Walsh founded PW Partners, LLC, an investment management firm. A 2014 article in Restaurant Finance Monitor stated that "each of the chains with which he has become involved has thrived on Wall Street in his wake." Walsh was a member of BJ's Restaurants' board from 2014 to 2022 and has also served on the boards of Del Taco and Famous Dave's.

In 2018 Walsh won the New York region of the 2018 Ernst & Young Entrepreneur of the Year Award. In 2022, Walsh was revealed as a major investor in former President Donald Trump's Truth Social.
