= Patrick Walsh (Michigan politician) =

American politician

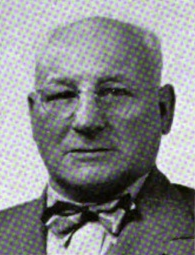
Patrick Walsh

Patrick Walsh (January 1, 1892 – December 25, 1978) was an American politician based in Detroit, Michigan. Walsh was a member of the Michigan Senate 1949–1954 and a member of the Democratic Party.
