= 1984 All-Ireland Junior Hurling Championship =

All Ireland Champions
- Winners: Kilkenny (5th win)
- Captain: J. Brennan

All Ireland Runners-up
- Runners-up: Galway

Provincial Champions
- Munster: Cork
- Leinster: Kilkenny
- Ulster: Derry
- Connacht: Not Played

The 1984 All-Ireland Junior Hurling Championship was the 63rd staging of the All-Ireland Junior Championship since its establishment by the Gaelic Athletic Association in 1912.

Cork entered the championship as the defending champions, however, they were beaten by Kilkenny in the All-Ireland semi-final.

The All-Ireland final was played on 5 August 1984 at Semple Stadium in Thurles, between Kilkenny and Galway, in what was their first ever meeting in a final. Kilkenny won the match by 0-13 to 2-05 to claim their fifth championship title overall and a first title since 1956.

== Results ==
=== All-Ireland Junior Hurling Championship ===
==== All-Ireland semi-finals ====
22 July 1984 Semi-final	Galway	5-19 - 1-02	Derry	St. Brendan's Park

31 July 1984 Semi-final	Kilkenny	2-15 - 2-12	Cork	Nowlan Park

==== All-Ireland final ====
5 August 1984 Final	Kilkenny	0-13 - 2-05	Galway	Semple Stadium
