= Edward C. Finch =

American politician

Member of the Washington State Senate for the 21st district
- In office 1927–1931

Personal details
- Born: Edward Corwin Finch; February 2, 1862 Lebanon, Ohio, United States
- Died: September 25, 1933 (aged 71) Seattle, Washington, United States
- Party: Republican

Edward Corwin Finch (February 2, 1862 – September 25, 1933) was an American politician in the state of Washington. He served in the Washington State Senate from 1927 to 1931.
