= Equinox Group =

American luxury fitness company

Equinox Holdings, Inc.
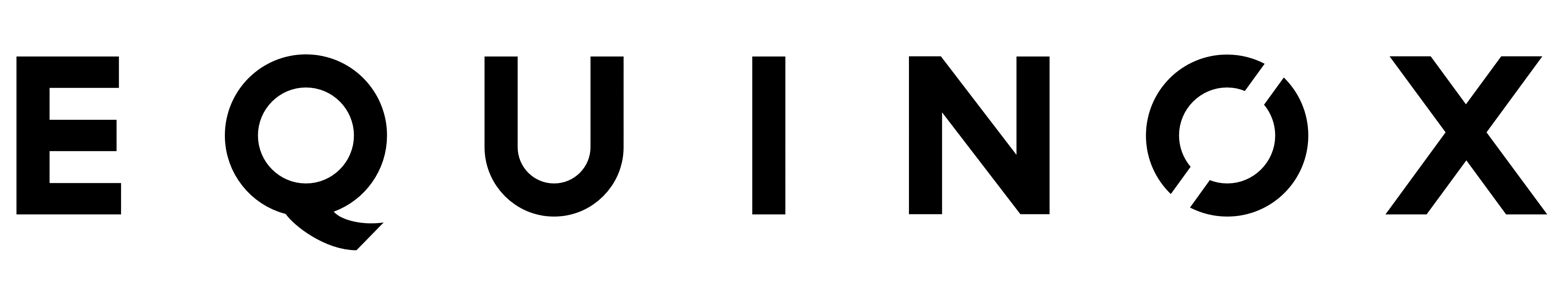
- Type: Subsidiary
- Industry: Fitness
- Founded: September 23, 1991; 34 years ago
- Founders: Danny, Vito and Lavinia Errico
- Headquarters: New York City, United States
- Key people: Harvey Spevak (chairman); Marc Mastronardi (president)
- Services: Health club
- Revenue: ▲US$2 billion (2025)
- Owner: The Related Companies
- Number of employees: 10,000+ (2023)
- Subsidiaries: Equinox; SoulCycle; PURE Yoga; Precision Run; Equinox Hotels; PROJECT by Equinox; Equinox Explore; Equinox Media
- Website: www.equinox.com

Equinox Holdings, Inc. is an American fitness company and health club headquartered in New York City. The company operates more than 300 club facilities in major cities in the United States, as well as in London, Toronto, and Vancouver in Canada.

Equinox Group also has a digital platform, the Equinox+ App, that provides access to digital classes. Equinox is owned by a group of investors including Harvey Spevak, executive chairman and managing partner, as well as principals of Related Companies. It operates several lifestyle brands: Equinox, Equinox Hotels, Precision Run, Project by Equinox, Equinox Explore, Equinox Media, Furthermore, Pure Yoga, Blink Fitness, and SoulCycle.

== History ==
The first Equinox location opened on September 23, 1991 in Manhattan's Upper West Side. It was started by the Errico family—Danny, Vito and Lavinia Errico. In 2000, Spevak led a management buyout of Equinox to two private equity firms, North Castle Partners and J.W. Childs. In 2006, he partnered with Related Chairman principals to acquire a controlling interest in Equinox and secured a significant minority investment from private equity firm L Catterton in 2017.

In 2008, Equinox brought Pure Yoga to the United States from Hong Kong. In 2011, Equinox launched Blink, a separate fitness company, and acquired SoulCycle. In July 2019, Equinox launched Equinox Hotels in Hudson Yards, Manhattan. In January 2023, Equinox banned gym memberships submitted on New Year's Day, to both praise and criticism. The company said the purpose of the ban was to "snub short-term resolutions".

Equinox acquired SoulCycle in May 2011. In 2014, the company acquired six Sports Club/LA Rebook Sports Clubs.

== Digital services ==
In a 2024 interview, Equinox Fitness Clubs' chief technology officer Eswar Veluri said that the company began developing online membership sales in 2010 as part of preparations for Blink Fitness. Memberships had previously been sold through advisers in its clubs.

Veluri also described personalized class recommendations and proximity-based check-in through the Equinox app. As of March 2024, a "club mode" feature was available at selected locations, providing automatic connection to club Wi-Fi and access to audio from classes and televisions through the app.

== Controversies and criticism ==
=== Hard-to-cancel practices ===
Equinox and SoulCycle have been accused of making it hard for their members to cancel subscriptions. In 2025, Equinox entered into a $600,000 settlement with the state of New York for these practices.

=== Employment practices ===
A 2019 article in The New York Times reported that trainers often worked long hours, sometimes as many as 80 hours a week, forcing some to sleep in employee locker rooms or their cars between shifts. Former and current trainers also described intense pressure from the company to recruit and retain clients drawn from the club's members.

In 2013, the company resolved two California lawsuits concerning unpaid overtime for trainers via out-of-court settlements.

=== Fundraising boycott ===
Businesses owned by and affiliated with Equinox, primarily Equinox gyms and SoulCycle, faced calls for a boycott. The boycott was first prompted by a widely publicized fundraiser for then-president Donald Trump by Stephen Ross, the founder and principal owner of Related Companies. Equinox and SoulCycle responded to the boycott by stating it did not endorse the fundraiser and argued Ross was a "passive investor."

=== Blink Fitness bankruptcy ===
On August 12, 2024, Blink Fitness filed for Chapter 11 bankruptcy protection, blaming slow sales caused by the COVID-19 pandemic and increased rising costs as part of the decision. The company plans to shutter some of its locations and plans to sell itself.

In December 2024, Blink Fitness was acquired by PureGym for $121 million, outbidding Planet Fitness in a bankruptcy auction. PureGym began rebranding the gyms the following year.

Buckhead Village redevelopment

Equinox announced plans in 2026 to open its first Georgia location in Atlanta’s Buckhead Village. The project resulted in the displacement of several local businesses. Affected business owners said they were given limited time to vacate their premises and expressed concern over the disruption to long-established businesses.

== Key people ==
=== Harvey Spevak ===
Harvey Spevak is the Executive Chairman and Managing Partner of Equinox Group. Spevak became the CEO of Equinox Group in 1999. In 2000, he led a management buyout of Equinox to two private equity firms, North Castle Partners and J.W. Childs. In 2006, he partnered with Related Principles to acquire and secure a significant minority investment from global consumer-focused private equity firm Catterton in 2017.

In 2019, Spevak opened Equinox's 100th club in Hudson Yards, Manhattan, followed by the brand's first hotel, as well as coworking venture Industrious at Equinox, in the same neighborhood.

== See also ==
- Town Sports International Holdings
